= List of rugby union playing countries =

This list shows each country which has a union affiliated to World Rugby, the international governing body of rugby union. It also shows the number of registered clubs playing in each country, official referees, and the number of registered players, broken down by gender and age group.

In 2023, the total number of registered players increased from 5.82 million to 8.4 million. These numbers are all estimates.

Country	Clubs	Players	Referees	Under 13 boys	Under 13 girls	Teen males	Teen females	Senior (adult) males	Senior (adult) females	Total males	Total females	Total players
American Samoa	0	0	0	0	0	0	0	0	0	0	0	0
Andorra	2	213	1	70	5	65	4	54	15	189	24	213
Argentina	420	152790	0	0	0	0	0	0	0	152543	247	152790
Armenia	3	250	0	0	0	0	0	0	0	0	0	250
Australia (Note: Australia: Data listed in the table, including the total of 86,952 registered players, is from the archived IRB webpage as at 25 September 2011, which allows for comparison to figures from other countries sourced from the same website in the same time frame. Participation figures recorded in later archives from the IRB include both registered and unregistered players (totals over 297,000 in 2012, and over 482,000 in 2014, and are therefore not useful in comparison to the rest of the table). Other sources, such as Ausport, put the overall number of rugby players as low as 42,100 but this is based on older data from 1999–2000.)	767	170952	4900	26664	0	19239	0	39380	1669	85283	1669	170952
Austria	26	5676	18	80	35	190	42	1327	73	1597	150	5676
Azerbaijan	3	0	0	0	0	0	0	0	0	0	0	0
Bahamas	6	1635	20	10	10	150	15	400	50	1560	75	1635
Barbados	6	321	7	26	0	123	14	135	23	284	37	321
Belgium	58	35266	192	4564	857	3580	503	4121	641	33265	2001	35266
Bermuda	8	901	11	220	33	125	40	192	91	737	164	901
Bosnia & Herzegovina	9	911	23	292	54	186	71	245	63	723	188	911
Botswana	12	9395	20	260	70	2800	1500	630	135	7690	1705	9395
Brazil	230	69130	74	800	100	2915	150	5541	624	60256	8874	69130
British Virgin Islands	0	0	0	0	0	0	0	0	0	0	0	0
Bulgaria	36	3121	48	1225	182	1109	177	367	61	2701	420	3121
Burundi	0	0	0	0	0	0	0	0	0	0	0	0
Cambodia	0	0	0	0	0	0	0	0	0	0	0	0
Cameroon	32	3722	37	212	12	375	22	1049	52	1636	86	3722
Canada	309	47853	605	3337	411	5999	1997	9032	3077	18368	5485	47853
Cayman Islands	4	2200	30	388	182	961	251	305	113	1654	546	2200
Chile	26	42755	338	8049	127	5448	168	4830	133	38327	2428	42755
China	15	6430	70	70	60	600	200	3900	600	5570	7860	6430
Chinese Taipei	13	2800	101	200	0	500	0	1000	100	2700	100	2800
Colombia	76	14214	88	450	0	1924	21	2784	235	11158	3111	14214
Cook Islands	21	4258	82	675	434	469	104	526	50	3670	588	4258
Croatia	21	6142	23	809	25	511	22	733	42	5053	189	6142
Czech Republic	22	13382	110	1843	201	1321	149	1697	171	12861	521	13282
Denmark	27	4606	74	203	52	296	56	1766	233	4265	341	4606
England	1809	382154	9207	694899	408072	602564	129121	131399	24933	1428862	562126	382154
Fiji	490	136030	309	22500	0	5200	60	8000	270	135700	330	136030
Finland	18	770	35	0	0	25	4	265	80	290	84	770
France	1798	670847	2095	165497	4444	57557	2360	124079	6910	597133	13714	670847
Georgia	46	65381	45	940	12	2332	5	878	14	65150	331	65381
Germany	108	45656	319	2083	333	3301	527	4639	773	43023	1633	45656
Ghana	5	1250	0	0	0	0	0	0	0	1250	0	1250
Greece	0	220	0	0	0	0	0	0	0	0	0	220
Guam	3	912	12	162	112	284	230	96	28	542	370	912
Guyana	3	1324	25	400	105	315	75	295	134	1010	314	1324
Hong Kong	59	10525	86	1998	1332	1270	500	1813	612	8081	2444	10525
Hungary	33	2207	34	181	21	865	59	1002	79	2048	159	2207
India	96	22282	98	2936	1367	9481	4806	2982	710	15399	6883	222282
Indonesia	16	830	6	40	3	291	72	402	22	733	97	830
Iran	0	0	0	0	0	0	0	0	0	0	0	0
Ireland	221	157080	2380	57409	6900	57867	2700	25440	2764	140716	17364	157080
Israel	12	755	15	60	0	300	20	300	75	660	95	755
Italy	784	168176	857	28364	3240	17220	488	15848	1016	161432	7744	168176
Ivory Coast	14	47383	45	1905	142	2645	201	470	20	45020	2363	47383
Jamaica	9	2090	30	484	117	1120	56	276	37	1880	210	2090
Japan	1522	270368	4545	31945	3937	37294	352	48470	370	254709	15659	270368
Kazakhstan	12	4650	21	525	380	588	470	344	343	3457	1193	4650
Kenya	60	65904	518	4446	2518	27930	580	6772	658	59148	5756	65904
Korea	5	12620	80	200	150	880	10	1300	80	10380	2500	12620
Kyrgyzstan	0	0	0	0	0	0	0	0	0	0	0	0
Lao	0	0	0	0	0	0	0	0	0	0	0	0
Latvia	16	995	21	50	13	290	52	372	18	912	83	995
Lithuania	16	9544	22	112	0	670	18	730	14	8512	32	9544
Luxembourg	3	5437	7	721	402	625	276	348	65	4694	743	5437
Madagascar	410	42540	160	1080	170	3600	170	16750	770	41430	1110	42540
Malaysia	300	60030	702	15000	0	20000	0	25000	30	60000	30	60030
Mali	0	230	0	0	0	0	0	0	0	0	230	230
Malta	7	3785	8	69	0	135	8	292	81	3496	89	3785
Mauritania	0	0	0	0	0	0	0	0	0	0	0	0
Mauritius	7	910	9	50	0	160	30	155	15	865	45	910
Mexico	26	3454	54	665	476	831	350	968	164	2464	990	3454
Moldova	7	7610	55	490	242	1138	281	379	80	7007	603	7610
Monaco	2	165	4	52	0	59	0	52	2	163	2	165
Morocco	0	0	0	0	0	0	0	0	0	0	0	0
Morocco	20	11331	80	748	30	2934	30	3489	100	10171	160	11331
Namibia	27	34226	26	8000	0	5000	18	1084	124	33084	142	34226
Netherlands	82	27869	260	1432	101	2202	155	4386	593	26020	849	27869
New Zealand	600	156893	2255	64794	9540	40390	3521	27726	922	132910	13983	156893
Nigeria	17	9198	10	915	572	3421	720	510	60	8846	1352	9196
Niue Islands	6	405	9	70	40	80	40	150	25	300	105	405
Norway	27	1502	24	168	47	369	120	612	186	1149	353	1502
Pakistan	49	4012	21	300	0	1810	25	1859	18	3969	43	4012
Papua New Guinea	72	7200	52	150	50	400	100	2290	210	6840	360	7200
Paraguay	21	22568	39	200	0	1820	80	1420	48	31440	128	22568
Peru	11	950	15	150	10	220	0	500	70	870	80	950
Philippines	17	4300	11	300	75	200	75	500	150	4000	300	4300
Poland	58	28963	59	1075	59	1541	48	3143	97	27559	804	28963
Portugal	46	52270	52	1152	0	2749	0	1040	329	49541	3329	52270
Romania	83	40512	199	4915	320	3067	150	1048	112	40030	382	40512
Russia	105	42519	89	2878	0	6853	835	3633	320	41364	1155	42519
Rwanda	0	380	0	0	0	0	0	0	0	0	380	380
Samoa	140	53372	600	9279	4149	1792	212	7690	250	48761	4611	53372
Scotland	251	62500	360	9541	324	15009	1297	11687	642	60237	2263	62500
Senegal	13	8350	19	1400	50	1000	110	720	70	8120	230	8350
Serbia	12	5352	25	273	72	360	19	605	23	5238	114	5352
Singapore	24	9690	90	2448	918	3366	1428	1020	510	6834	2856	9690
Slovenia	7	480	5	140	10	30	10	260	30	430	50	480
Solomon Islands	48	3158	75	324	20	766	108	1800	140	2890	268	3150
South Africa	1526	804279	3460	320842	4522	199213	4906	113174	8489	733229	17917	804279
Spain	210	60016	311	1812	129	7426	354	9588	707	49826	1190	60016
Sri Lanka	98	153325	396	35200	14110	48552	958	3850	655	138602	15723	153325
St Lucia	0	0	0	0	0	0	0	0	0	0	0	0
St. Vincent & The Grenadines	6	1036	3	205	109	415	127	140	40	760	276	1036
Eswatini	14	18920	43	4700	5100	4850	3100	740	430	10290	8630	18920
Sweden	41	3507	63	350	110	850	244	1452	501	2652	855	3507
Switzerland	30	18384	52	456	28	484	18	1274	124	1814	170	18384
Tahiti	18	4617	14	492	216	328	96	403	82	4223	394	4617
Tanzania	5	1120	0	0	0	0	0	0	0	0	1120	1120
Thailand	169	17732	104	2541	385	5522	1663	5716	1905	13779	3953	17732
Tonga	82	17891	8	370	0	3472	0	3049	0	17891	0	17891
Trinidad & Tobago	14	5060	58	1038	422	1798	341	1336	125	4172	888	5060
Tunisia	74	26218	93	4489	1304	5622	1958	1919	926	22030	4188	26218
Uganda	17	35110	114	4900	2200	5900	400	560	150	32360	2750	35110
Ukraine	44	8880	68	800	50	1100	30	800	100	8700	180	8880
Uruguay	23	30065	64	2896	10	1803	98	1219	39	29918	147	30065
United States	2588	126151	2061	178819	150267	47323	19594	50211	11769	126353	181630	126983
Uzbekistan	0	0	0	0	0	0	0	0	0	0	0	0
Vanuatu	12	2520	22	500	50	720	60	1100	90	2320	200	2520
Venezuela	34	4415	30	60	20	380	25	1650	280	4090	325	4415
Wales	250	160557	12053	112318	1100	114500	1492	122408	1739	159226	11331	160557
Zambia	20	20200	40	4100	400	3600	300	1600	200	19300	900	20200
Zimbabwe	17	47541	44	7900	0	12975	425	768	95	47541	520	47541
Totals (Note: The totals for all the age groups combined fail to match the total due to Argentina's failure to supply breakdown figures for age group and gender. Assuming total players as correct figure.)	148,633	8,404,445	182,972	4,552,495	976,498	4,337,930	581,589	972,443	190,443	6,965,411	1,338,034	8,404,445

== Footnotes ==
Notes
