= Timeline of foundation of national rugby unions =

This timeline lists the foundation dates of the national governing bodies for rugby union—known as rugby unions or federations. The first union was the Rugby Football Union (RFU) that was founded in 1871 to govern rugby union within England. It was founded following the first ever rugby union international, played between England and Scotland in 1871. The Scottish Football Union (later renamed the Scottish Rugby Union) was then founded in 1873, the Irish Rugby Football Union in 1879 and the Welsh Rugby Union in 1881.

== Timeline ==
- 1871 (English) Rugby Football Union (RFU)
- 1873 Scottish Rugby Union (as Scottish Football Union until 1924)
- 1874 Southern Rugby Football Union (Colonial New South Wales rugby union; renamed New South Wales Rugby Union in 1892)
- 1879 Irish Rugby Football Union (a merger of two Irish unions both formed in 1874)
- 1881 Welsh Rugby Union
- 1883 Northern Rugby Union (Colonial Queensland rugby union; renamed Queensland Rugby Union in the 1890s)
- 1889 South African Rugby Board (merged with South African Rugby Union in 1992 to form South African Rugby Football Union; merged body renamed South African Rugby Union in 2005)
- 1892 New Zealand Rugby (founded as New Zealand Rugby Football Union, known as New Zealand Rugby Union from 2006–2013)
- 1895 Rhodesia Rugby Football Union (Zimbabwe RU after 1980)
- 1899 Argentine Rugby Union
- 1900 German Rugby Federation
- 1908 Sri Lanka Rugby Football Union (as Ceylon Rugby Football Union)
- 1913 Fiji Rugby Union (founded as Fiji Rugby Football Union)
- 1916 Royal Moroccan Rugby Federation
- 1919 French Rugby Federation
- 1920 Guyana Rugby Football Union
- 1921 Malaysian Rugby Union (As Malaya Rugby Union)
- 1922 Catalan Rugby Federation
- 1923 Spanish Rugby Federation
- 1923 Tonga Rugby Football Union
- 1923 Samoa Rugby Football Union
- 1923 Kenya Rugby Football Union (as Rugby Football Union of Kenya)
- 1926 Japan Rugby Football Union
- 1926 Portuguese Rugby Federation
- 1926 Czech Rugby Union (as Czechoslovakia)
- 1928 Italian Rugby Federation
- 1928 Trinidad and Tobago Rugby Football Union
- 1931 Romanian Rugby Federation
- 1932 Dutch Rugby Union
- 1932 Swedish Rugby Union
- 1934 Hellenic Rugby Federation
- 1935 Belgian Rugby Federation
- 1935 Chilean Rugby Federation (as Rugby Union of Chile)
- 1936 Rugby Union of Russia (founded as, and successor of, Rugby Union of the Soviet Union)
- 1937 Thai Rugby Union
- 1946 Korea Rugby Union
- 1946 Chinese Taipei Rugby Union
- 1948 Singapore Rugby Union
- 1949 Rugby Australia (founded as Australian Rugby Union; renamed in 2017)
- 1950 Danish Rugby Union
- 1951 Uruguayan Rugby Union
- 1952 Niue Rugby Football Union
- 1953 Hong Kong Rugby Football Union
- 1953 Rugby Football Union of East Africa (umbrella organization that includes Kenya, Tanzania, and Uganda)
- 1954 Rugby Union of Serbia (as Yugoslavia)
- 1956 Royal Moroccan Rugby Federation
- 1957 Polish Rugby Union
- 1958 Jamaica Rugby Football Union
- 1959 Uganda Rugby Union (as URFU)
- 1960 Senegalese Rugby Federation
- 1960 British Virgin Islands Rugby Football Union
- 1960 Latvian Rugby Federation (as regional body of USSR)
- 1961 Côte d'Ivoire Rugby Federation
- 1961 Lithuanian Rugby Federation (as regional body under USSR - full nation body in 1990s)
- 1962 Bulgarian Rugby Federation
- 1962 Croatian Rugby Federation (as part of Yugoslavia)
- 1963 Madagascan Rugby Federation
- 1963 Solomon Islands Rugby Union Federation
- 1963 Papua New Guinea Rugby Football Union
- 1963 Brazilian Rugby Confederation (as Rugby Union of Brazil)
- 1964 Georgia Rugby Union (as regional body under USSR - full nation body in 1990s)
- 1964 Barbados Rugby Football Union
- 1964 Bermuda Rugby Football Union
- 1964 Norwegian Rugby Union
- 1965 Rugby Canada (founded as Canadian Rugby Union)
- 1967 Martinique Rugby Committee (territorial committee of French Rugby Federation)
- 1968 Indian Rugby Football Union
- 1968 Finnish Rugby Federation
- 1970 Paraguayan Rugby Union
- 1971 Cayman Rugby Football Union
- 1971 Israel Rugby Union
- 1972 Swiss Rugby Federation
- 1972 Tunisian Rugby Federation
- 1973 Mexican Rugby Federation
- 1973 Bahamas Rugby Football Union
- 1974 Arabian Gulf Rugby Football Union (founded as Gulf Rugby Football Union) — then an overseas member of the Rugby Football Union; became independent in 1990. Officially disbanded in 2011; to be replaced with separate national unions in each of its former member countries. The new United Arab Emirates union was founded shortly before the AGRFU dissolution.
- 1974 Luxembourg Rugby Federation
- 1974 Saint Lucia Rugby Football Union
- 1975 USA Rugby (founded as United States of America Rugby Football Union)
- 1975 Zambia Rugby Football Union
- 1979 Kazakhstan Rugby Union (as regional association of USSR - full national body in 1994)
- 1977 Brunei Rugby Football Union
- 1980 Vanuatu Rugby Football Union
- 1986 Andorran Rugby Federation
- 1989 Tahiti Rugby Union
- 1989 Cook Islands Rugby Union
- 1989 Rugby Association of Slovenia
- 1990 Namibia Rugby Union
- 1990 Hungarian Rugby Union
- 1990 Austrian Rugby Federation
- 1990 American Samoa Rugby Union
- 1991 Venezuelan Rugby Federation
- 1991 National Rugby Federation of Ukraine
- 1991 Malta Rugby Football Union
- 1992 Botswana Rugby Union
- 1992 Moldovan Rugby Federation
- 1992 Nepal Rugby Association
- 1992 Bosnia and Herzegovina Rugby Federation
- 1992 South African Rugby Union (founded as South Africa Rugby Football Union, a merger of the white South African Rugby Board and the non-racial South African Rugby Union; adopted current name in 2005)
- 1993 Rugby Union Mauritius
- 1995 Swaziland Rugby Union
- 1996 Monegasque Rugby Federation
- 1996 Chinese Rugby Football Association
- 1996 Macau Rugby Union
- 1997 Peruvian Rugby Federation
- 1997 Cameroonian Rugby Federation
- 1997 Guam Rugby Football Union
- 1998 Philippine Rugby Football Union
- 1998 Nigeria Rugby Football Federation
- 1998 Libyan Rugby Association
- 1998 Saint Vincent and the Grenadines Rugby Union
- 2000 Pakistan Rugby Union
- 2001 Lao Rugby Federation
- 2001 Togolese Rugby Federation
- 2001 Burundian Rugby Federation
- 2001 Malian Rugby Federation
- 2001 Cambodian Federation of Rugby
- 2001 Turks and Caicos Islands Rugby Football Union
- 2003 Mongolian Rugby Football Union
- 2003 Rwandan Rugby Federation
- 2004 Azerbaijani Rugby Federation
- 2004 Uzbekistan Rugby Federation
- 2004 Dominican Rugby Federation
- 2004 Persatuan Rugby Union Indonesia
- 2004 Rugby Association of Panama
- 2004 Slovak Rugby Union
- 2005 Ghana Rugby Football Union
- 2005 Sammarinese Rugby Federation
- 2006 Cyprus Rugby Federation
- 2007 Jordan Rugby Union
- 2007 Estonian Rugby Union
- 2007 Guatemalan Rugby Association
- 2007 Tuvalu Rugby Union
- 2007 Algerian Rugby Federation
- 2008 Ecuadorian Rugby Federation
- 2008 Egyptian Rugby Football Union
- 2009 Turkey Rugby Federation
- 2009 Lebanese Rugby Union Federation
- 2009 UAE Rugby Federation
- 2009 Rugby Federation of Costa Rica
- 2010 Qatar Rugby Federation
- 2010 Rugby Iceland
- 2010 Afghanistan Rugby Federation
- 2010 Liechtenstein Rugby Union
- 2012 Federation of Lesotho Rugby
- 2012 Comorian Rugby Federation
- 2012 Syrian High Rugby Committee
- 2012 Rugby Belize
- 2013 Rugby Union of Belarus
- 2015 Haitian Rugby Federation

== See also ==
- History of rugby union
- World Rugby
