= Arab Rugby Federation =

International sports governing body

- الاتحاد العربي للرجبي
- The logo of the ARF
- Formation: 8 October 2012; 14 years ago
- Type: Sports federation
- Headquarters: Dubai
- Members: 14 unions
- President: UAER Qais Abdullah Al-Dhalai
- Vice Presidents: (TRF) Aref Belkheiria; Hasan Ahmed Khaled (ERFU); Abdullah Ali Al-Jamal (LRUF)
- Secretary: UAER Mohammed Ahmed Shaker
- Affiliations: World Rugby
- Website: Official website

Arab Rugby Federation (Arabic: الاتحاد العربي للرجبي), is the governing body of rugby union in Arab World. Founded in 2012, the Union today has 14 member unions in countries across Arab World.

== History ==
The Arab Rugby Federation was established on Monday, 8 October 2012 in Tunisia, and its permanent headquarters were in Tunis, and the goal was to promote and develop the game of rugby and raise its level in the Arab world.

On 1 October 2015, the UAE Rugby Federation held an extraordinary (emergency) general assembly in Dubai in order to revive the work of the Arab Rugby Federation. The United Arab Emirates. Mr. Qais Abdullah Al Dhalei was elected unanimously as president, and Dubai become the permanent executive headquarters of the Arab Rugby Federation, which is the same as the headquarters of the elected president in the United Arab Emirates.

== Members ==
There are 14 members in the Arab Rugby Federation.

Members who are part of Rugby Africa:

- Algeria (2015)
- Egypt (2018)
- Libya (2012)
- Morocco (2012)
- Sudan (2021)
- Tunisia (2012)

Members who are part of Asia Rugby:

- Iraq (2020)
- Jordan (2016)
- Lebanon (2012)
- Palestine (2021)
- Qatar (2012)
- Saudi Arabia (2012)
- Syria (2012)
- United Arab Emirates (2012)

== Competitions ==
Tournaments run by the Arab Rugby Federation include:

Senior Men
Men XV

- No competition

Men VII

- Arab Rugby Sevens Men's Tournament

Senior Women
Women XV

- No competition

Women VII

- Arab Rugby Sevens Women's Tournament
