= Rugby union in Egypt =

Rugby Union in Egypt is a minor but growing sport.

== Governing body ==
The governing body is the Egyptian Rugby Football Union, founded in 2008. It is a member of Rugby Africa and World Rugby. On 14 November 2024, Egypt was granted World Rugby Full Member status by the World Rugby Council.

== History ==
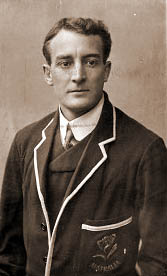
Australian rugby player Tom Richards played the game while stationed in Egypt.

Rugby was first introduced into Egypt by the British and was generally played by expatriates. However, the departure of the British from the region meant that the game went into sharp decline. Like many other North African nations, Egyptian rugby looked to Europe for inspiration, rather than the rest of Africa or the Middle East. However, the Dubai Sevens has helped stir some interest in the sport in Arabic-speaking nations. Rugby union is quite popular in neighbouring Israel, but the hostility between the two nations means that there is little sporting contact between them.

During the lead-up to the Dardanelles Campaign, and Gallipoli in World War I, several ANZAC and British troops were stationed in Egypt. They played several games "in the shadow of the pyramids", and these were "games that meant as much to the players and the keen followers as ever did an international game on the Sydney Cricket Ground". The pitches were described as consisting of "sun-baked mud that rashed and cut all unwary players, or several inches deep in heavy, black mud". Tom Richards would write:

"Playing on the Delta country, with the mighty monument of Cheops towering to a height of nearly 560 feet [170m] above our playing level, stirred everyone with a feeling of awe. It was certainly a venerable spot to play on... There was an atmosphere so full of Eastern mesmerism - the mystic veil of the East - that all young Australians conjured up wild imaginations of and played their manly game with the same vigour and dash as if they were in an amphitheatre, where any lack of determination meant 'thumbs down' which, in turn, meant death to the losers."

However, there has been an upsurge of rugby in the Middle East - particularly the Persian Gulf, and in Africa, and this has stimulated interest in the game there. In addition, the Egyptian diaspora in English and French-speaking countries has become interested in the game.

Cairo RFC was founded in the 1980s, as a social club and it was the only club in Egypt for several years. Alexandria RFC was founded in 2003, by expatriates. The first match was played in 1981. Cairo Rugby Club, led by Mickey Wheeler MTB, played against a team made up of expats from a construction Co. (Higgs and Hill) led by Bernie Adams. The first half was played by the designated teams and in the second half, many substitutes were allowed on the H and H team with anybody who brought boots to the match. The game was advertised on the local media and on the match day at the American school, the Mayor of Cairo attended with 4000 spectators. It was a great day, a great match and a great beginning.

== Rugby Union in Egypt Today ==
There are currently four Egyptian rugby clubs competing in the Egyptian national championship: Alexandria Rugby Club, Cairo Rugby, Eagles Rugby Club (formerly representing the Alexandria Aero Club), Panthers Rugby (formerly the German University in Cairo's women's rugby 7s team "GUC Panthers"), and Wolves Rugby (formerly the American University in Cairo's rugby team "AUC Wolves"). The Egyptian national rugby championship is split into men's and women's matches with Alexandria Rugby Club (participating as two teams: Alex A and Alex B), Eagles Rugby and Rugby Wolves playing in both matches and Cairo Rugby and Panthers Rugby each playing exclusively in men's and women's matches respectively.

The game is currently in a state of intense development, with Egyptian men's and women's national teams and an under-eighteens men's national team established, and the 2025 edition of the Arab Rugby 7s Championship confirmed to be hosted in Alexandria, Egypt.

== Under 20s rugby ==
Egypt has seen some progress in under-twenties rugby.

The first Egypt U-20s team toured Lebanon, playing two test matches and winning them both (52-5 and 14–10). Managed by Shady A. Abo Shady, founder of juniors and girls rugby, and coached by Ahmed El-Soussi, the squad was made up of players from several teams in Cairo and Alexandria.

== See also ==
- Arthur Turner (cricketer), played for Blackheath F.C. in rugby and the Egypt national cricket team.
