= List of rugby union players who have represented more than one nation =

The following list documents rugby union players who have played for more than one national team over the course of their career. The rules governing eligibility in international rugby can be found in Regulation 8 of the World Rugby Regulations.

Those not included in this list are:

- Any players who could choose to represent a new country after the dissolution of their former country.
  - For example, players from the former Soviet Union who could choose to represent Russia, or players from the former Yugoslavia who could choose to represent Croatia, do not qualify for the list.
- Any players who have played for both a combined team such as the British & Irish Lions, Pacific Islanders or South American Jaguars, and one of its constituent national teams.
  - For example, a player does not qualify for the list if they had played for the British Lions as well as any of its four constituents (England, Ireland, Scotland or Wales), but they would qualify if they had represented the Lions and Australia.
  - Similarly, they would not qualify for the list if they had played for the Pacific Islanders as well as any of its three constituents (Fiji, Samoa or Tonga), but they would qualify if they had represented the Pacific Islands and New Zealand.

== Rugby union players who have represented two nations ==
Name	First nation	Second nation
Orene Ai'i	Samoa	New Zealand
George Aitken	New Zealand	Scotland
Pita Alatini	Tonga	New Zealand
John Allan	Scotland	South Africa
Vaea Anitoni	Tonga	United States
Victor Arhip	Moldova	Russia
Graeme Bachop	New Zealand	Japan
Stephen Bachop	New Zealand	Samoa
Abdelatif Benazzi	Morocco	France
Tommaso Boni	Italy	United States
Frano Botica	New Zealand (Note: Frano Botica also represented the Australia–New Zealand XV.)	Croatia
Frank Bunce	Samoa	New Zealand
Daniel Carroll	Australia	United States
Adam Coleman	Australia	Tonga
Des Connor	Australia	New Zealand
Matthew Cooper	New Zealand	Croatia
Jack Dempsey	Australia	Scotland
Diego Dominguez	Argentina	Italy
Charlie Faumuina	New Zealand	Samoa
Malakai Fekitoa	New Zealand	Tonga
Vaea Fifita	New Zealand	Tonga
Israel Folau	Australia	Tonga
Jack Gage	Ireland	South Africa
Gheorghe Gajion	Moldova	Romania
Julian Gardner	Australia	Italy
Adrian Garvey	Zimbabwe	South Africa
Mario Gerosa	Argentina	Italy
Paul Gibbs	Australia	Hong Kong
Colin Gilray	New Zealand	Scotland
Willis Halaholo	Wales	Tonga
Malik Hamadache	Algeria	France
Bill Hardcastle	New Zealand	Australia
Richard Hardwick	Australia	Namibia
Barry Heatlie	South Africa	Argentina
Alec Hepburn	England	Scotland
Christopher Hilsenbeck	Germany	United States
Alex Hodgman	New Zealand (Note: Alex Hodgman also represented the Fiji Under 20s at junior level.)	Australia
Barry Holmes	England	Argentina
Shane Howarth	New Zealand	Wales
Nathan Hughes	England	Fiji
Alama Ieremia	Samoa	New Zealand
Akira Ioane	New Zealand	Samoa
Josh Ioane	New Zealand	Samoa
Evan Jessep	New Zealand	Australia
Michael Jones	Western Samoa	New Zealand
Jamie Joseph	New Zealand	Japan
Sam Kaleta	Japan	Samoa
Doug Keller	Australia	Scotland
Jean Kleyn	Ireland	South Africa
Tau Koloamatangi	Hong Kong (Note: Tau Koloamatangi also represented the New Zealand Under 20s at junior level.)	Tonga
Andriy Kovalenco	Ukraine	Spain
Titi Lamositele	United States	Samoa
George Latu	Tonga	Samoa
Sinali Latu	Tonga	Japan
Sione Latu	Tonga	Japan
Sione Lauaki	Pacific Islanders (Note: Sione Lauaki played for the Pacific Islanders, but never played for any of the national teams represented by the Islanders (Fiji, Samoa and Tonga).)	New Zealand
Ngani Laumape	New Zealand (Note: Ngani Laumape also represented the Australia–New Zealand XV.)	Tonga
Christian Leali'ifano	Australia	Samoa
Bob Lloyd	England	Hong Kong
Ekeroma Luaiufi	Samoa	Japan
Steve Luatua	New Zealand	Samoa
Andrei Mahu	Moldova	Romania
James Marsh	Scotland	England
Tabai Matson	New Zealand	Fiji
Rufus McLean	Scotland	United States
Frank Mellish	England	South Africa
Dylan Mika	Samoa	New Zealand
Gustavo Milano	Argentina	Italy
George Moala	New Zealand	Tonga
Atu Moli	New Zealand	Tonga
Alex Moreno	Argentina	Italy
Acura Niuqila	Fiji	Australia
Patricio Noriega	Argentina	Australia
Matt Pini	Australia	Italy
Salesi Piutau	New Zealand	Tonga
Augustine Pulu	New Zealand	Tonga
Tom Richards	Australia	British Lions (Note: Tom Richards played for the British Lions, but never played for any of the national teams represented by the Lions (England, Ireland, Scotland and Wales).)
Topo Rodríguez	Argentina (Note: Topo Rodriguez also played for the South American Jaguars, and represented Tahiti in an invitational match against France.)	Australia
Aidan Ross	New Zealand (Note: Aidan Ross also represented the Australia–New Zealand XV.)	Australia
Anton Rudoy	Kazakhstan	Russia
Jamie Salmon	New Zealand	England
Alatini Saulala	Tonga	United States
John Schuster	Western Samoa	New Zealand
Irae Simone	Australia	Samoa
Scott Sio	Australia	Samoa
Sitiveni Sivivatu	Pacific Islanders (Note: Sitiveni Sivivatu played for the Pacific Islanders, but never played for any of the national teams represented by the Islanders (Fiji, Samoa and Tonga).)	New Zealand
Brian Smith	Australia	Ireland
Lima Sopoaga	New Zealand	Samoa
Pita Gus Sowakula	New Zealand	Fiji
Eddie Stapleton	Australia	New Zealand
Owen Stephens	New Zealand	Australia
Shaun Stevenson	New Zealand (Note: Shaun Stevenson also represented the Australia–New Zealand XV.)	Samoa
Christian Stewart	Canada	South Africa
Tiaan Strauss	South Africa	Australia
Blair Swannell	British Lions (Note: Blair Swannell played for the British Lions, but never played for any of the national teams represented by the Lions (England, Ireland, Scotland and Wales).)	Australia
Ilivasi Tabua	Fiji	Australia
Timo Tagaloa	Samoa	New Zealand
Seta Tamanivalu	New Zealand	Fiji
Nofomuli Taumoefolau	Tonga	Japan
Henry Thomas	England	Wales
Lopeti Timani	Australia	Tonga
Sitaleki Timani	Australia	Tonga
Ofisa Tonu'u	Samoa	New Zealand
Jeffery Toomaga-Allen	New Zealand	Samoa (Note: Jeffery Toomaga-Allen also represented the Australia–New Zealand XV.)
Patiliai Tuidraki	Fiji	Japan
Va'aiga Tuigamala	New Zealand	Samoa
Jacob Umaga	England	Samoa
Peter Umaga-Jensen	New Zealand	Samoa
Virimi Vakatawa	France	Fiji
Joeli Vidiri	Fiji	New Zealand
Apenisa Vodo	Fiji	Italy
Cooper Vuna	Australia	Tonga
Ian Williams	Australia (Note: Ian Williams also represented the Australia–New Zealand XV.)	Japan
Ron Williams	New Zealand	Fiji

== Rugby union players who have represented two nations – one nation via official representative team ==
Name	First nation	Second nation
Jermaine Ainsley	Australia	(Māori people) New Zealand Māori
James Arlidge	(Māori people) New Zealand Māori	Japan
Vakatini Atuahiva	(Māori people) New Zealand Māori	Cook Islands
Luke Erenavula	New Zealand Heartland	Fiji
Riki Flutey	(Māori people) New Zealand Māori	England (Note: Riki Flutey also represented the British Lions.)
Jamison Gibson-Park	(Māori people) New Zealand Māori	Ireland (Note: Jamison Gibson-Park also represented the British Lions.)
Craig Glendinning	(Māori people) New Zealand Māori	Samoa
Haereiti Hetet	(Māori people) New Zealand Māori	Fiji
George Konia	(Māori people) New Zealand Māori	Japan
Maku Koroiyadi	(United Kingdom) British Army	Fiji
Tala Leiasamaivao	New Zealand Heartland	Samoa
James Lowe	(Māori people) New Zealand Māori	Ireland (Note: James Lowe also represented the British Lions.)
Sean Maitland	(Māori people) New Zealand Māori	Scotland (Note: Sean Maitland also represented the British Lions.)
Deacon Manu	(Māori people) New Zealand Māori	Fiji
Tony Marsh	(Māori people) New Zealand Māori	France
Sam Matavesi	Fiji	(United Kingdom) British Royal Navy
Daniel Morath	New Zealand Heartland	Tonga
Ryan Nicholas	(Māori people) New Zealand Māori	Japan
Mana Otai	New Zealand Heartland	Tonga
Junior Paramore	New Zealand Heartland	Samoa
Adam Parker	(Māori people) New Zealand Māori	Japan
Veikoso Poloniati	New Zealand Heartland	Tonga
Jack Prasad	(United Kingdom) British Army	Fiji
Bryce Robins	(Māori people) New Zealand Māori	Japan
Ethan Roots	(Māori people) New Zealand Māori	England
Matt Te Pou	(Māori people) New Zealand Māori	Tonga
Blade Thomson	(Māori people) New Zealand Māori	Scotland
Thomas Waldrom	(Māori people) New Zealand Māori	England

== Rugby union players who have represented two nations – different nation in rugby sevens ==
Name	First nation	Second nation
Pita Ahki	New Zealand (7s)	Tonga (RU)
Andrew Aitken	Scotland (7s)	South Africa (RU)
Sosene Anesi	Samoa (7s)	New Zealand (RU)
Tani Bay	Argentina (7s)	Spain (RU)
Ifereimi Boladau	Fiji (7s)	(United Kingdom) British Army (RU)
Colin Bourke	(Māori people) New Zealand Māori (RU)	Japan (7s)
Ignacio Brex	Argentina (7s)	Italy (RU)
Luther Burrell	(Cricket West Indies) West Indies (7s)	England (RU)
Steve Devine	Australia (7s)	New Zealand (RU)
Michael Dods	England (7s)	Scotland (RU)
Tima Fainga'anuku	New Zealand (7s)	Tonga (RU)
Sione Faka'osilea	Tonga (7s)	Romania (RU)
Ipolito Fenukitau	Tonga (RU)	Australia (7s)
Toby Fricker	Wales (7s)	United States (RU)
Jayden Hayward	New Zealand (7s)	Italy (RU)
Daniel Heenan	Australia (RU)	Japan (7s)
Teiva Jacquelain	(French Polynesia) Tahiti (7s)	France (7s)
Brackin Karauria-Henry	Australia (7s)	Japan (7s)
Warwick Lahmert	New Zealand (7s)	England (7s)
Ben Lam	New Zealand (7s)	Samoa (RU)
Pat Lam	New Zealand (7s)	Samoa (RU)
Fritz Lee	New Zealand (7s)	Samoa (RU)
Sébastien Loubsens	France (7s)	Spain (RU)
Sirilo Lovokuro	Fiji (RU)	Japan (7s)
Simana Mafileo	Tonga (RU)	Japan (7s)
Emosi Naisaramaki	Fiji (7s)	(United Kingdom) British Army (RU)
Etene Nanai-Seturo	New Zealand (7s)	Samoa (RU)
Tim Nanai-Williams	New Zealand (7s)	Samoa (RU)
Paulo Nawalu	Fiji (RU)	Japan (7s)
Dion O'Cuinneagain	South Africa (7s)	Ireland (RU)
Solodrau Radianirova	(United Kingdom) British Army (RU)	Fiji (7s)
Peter Ratukadreu	(United Kingdom) British Army (RU)	Fiji (7s)
Salesi Rayasi	New Zealand (7s)	Fiji (RU) (Note: Salesi Rayasi also represented Samoa Under 20s at junior level in rugby union.)
Kevin Senio	Samoa (7s)	New Zealand (RU)
Talia'uli Sikuea	Tonga (7s)	Romania (RU)
Tu Tamarua	Australia (7s)	Cook Islands (RU)
Murphy Taramai	New Zealand (7s)	Samoa (RU)
Semi Taupeaafe	Tonga (RU)	Australia (7s)
Aidan Toua	Australia (7s)	Papua New Guinea (RU)
Belgium Tuatagaloa	New Zealand (7s)	Samoa (RU)
Nafi Tuitavake	New Zealand (7s)	Tonga (RU)
Sam Vaka	New Zealand (7s)	Tonga (RU)
Riaan van Zyl	South Africa (7s)	United States (RU)
Lolagi Visinia	New Zealand (7s)	Samoa (RU)
Jack Wilson	New Zealand (7s)	England (7s)

== Rugby union players who have represented two nations – different nation in rugby league ==
Name	First nation	Second nation
Coenraad Breytenbach	South Africa (RL)	Russia (RU)
Brian Carney	(United Kingdom) Great Britain (RL)	Ireland (RU)
Henry Fa'afili	New Zealand (RL)	Samoa (RU)
Maurie Fa'asavalu	Samoa (RU)	England (RL) (Note: Maurie Fa'asavalu also represented Great Britain in rugby league.)
Marcos Flegmann	Mexico (RU)	United States (RL)
Craig Gower	Australia (RL)	Italy (RU)
Shontayne Hape	New Zealand (RL)	England (RU)
Jarryd Hayne	Australia (RL)	Fiji (7s)
Michael Horak	South Africa (RL)	England (RU)
Kevin Iro	New Zealand (RL)	Cook Islands (7s)
Frederick Jackson	British Lions (RU) (Note: Frederick Jackson played for the British Lions in rugby union, but never played for any of the national teams represented by the Lions (England, Ireland, Scotland and Wales).)	New Zealand (RL)
Solomone Kata	New Zealand (RL)	Tonga (RU)
Wise Kativerata	Australia (7s)	Fiji (RL)
Emosi Koloto	Tonga (RU)	New Zealand (RL)
Marika Koroibete	Fiji (RL)	Australia (RU) (Note: Marika Koroibete also represented the Australia–New Zealand XV in rugby union.)
Tasesa Lavea	New Zealand (RL)	Samoa (RU)
Andy Marinos	South Africa (RL)	Wales (RU)
Dally Messenger	Australia (RU)	New Zealand (RL)
Eto Nabuli	Fiji (RL)	Australia (RU)
Taqele Naiyaravoro	Fiji (RL)	Australia (RU)
Ian Noble	Zimbabwe (RU)	South Africa (RL)
Eddie Paea	Tonga (RU)	Niue (RL)
Henry Paul	New Zealand (RL)	England (RU)
Semi Radradra	Australia (RL)	Fiji (RU)
Curtis Rona	(Māori people) New Zealand Māori (RL)	Australia (RU)
Setaimata Sa	New Zealand (RL)	Samoa (RU)
Denny Solomona	Samoa (RL)	England (RU)
Joseph Sua'ali'i	Samoa (RL)	Australia (RU)
Timana Tahu	Australia (RU)	(Māori people) New Zealand Māori (RL)
Ben Te'o	Samoa (RL) (Note: Ben Te'o also played for the New Zealand Junior Kiwis at junior level in rugby league, and represented the British Lions at senior level in rugby union.)	England (RU)
Brad Thorn	Australia (RL)	New Zealand (RU)
Lote Tuqiri	Fiji (RL)	Australia (RU)
Lesley Vainikolo	New Zealand (RL)	England (RU) (Note: Lesley Vainikolo also represented Tonga in rugby sevens.)
Mitieli Vulikijapani	(United Kingdom) British Army (RU)	Fiji (RL)
Suliasi Vunivalu	Fiji (RL)	Australia (RU)
Peter Williams	England (RU)	Wales (RL)
Craig Wing	Australia (RL)	Japan (RU)
Frank Winterstein	Samoa (RL)	Australia (7s)
Thomas Woods	England (RU)	Wales (RL)

== Rugby union players who have represented two nations – different nation at junior level ==
Name	First nation	Second nation
Stuart Abbott	South Africa Under 23s	England
Vakh Abdaladze	Ireland Under 20s	(Georgia (country)) Georgia
Robbie Abel	(Australia) Australian Schoolboys	(Māori people) New Zealand Māori
Will Addison	England Under 20s	Ireland
Nigel Ah Wong	Australia National Academy	Samoa
Rodney Ah You	New Zealand Under 20s	Ireland
Tommaso Allan	Scotland Under 20s	Italy
Moses Alo-Emile	(Australia) Australian Schoolboys	France
Paul Alo-Emile	Australia Under 20s	Samoa
Anthony Alves	France Under 17s	Portugal
Gareth Anscombe	New Zealand Under 20s	Wales
Joe Apikotoa	New Zealand Residents U18s (RL)	Tonga
Vasily Artemyev	Ireland Under 19s	Russia
Richie Asiata	Australia Under 20s	Samoa
Uini Atonio	Samoa Under 20s	France
Ole Avei	Australia Under 21s	Samoa
Skipper Badenhorst	South Africa Under 21s	Namibia
Stuart Barnes	Wales Under 18s	England
Brad Barritt	(South Africa) Emerging Springboks	England (Note: Brad Barritt also represented the British Lions.)
Josh Bayliss	England Under 20s	Scotland
Finlay Bealham	(Australia) Australian Schoolboys	Ireland (Note: Finlay Bealham also represented the British Lions.)
Mathieu Bélie	France Under 20s	Spain
Iacopo Bianchi	Italy A	Romania
Carlos Blanco	Australia Under 21s	Spain
Benjamín Bonasso	Argentina Under 20s	United States
Isaac Boss	New Zealand Under 19s	Ireland
Ruan Botha	South Africa A	Japan
Renaldo Bothma	South Africa President's XV	Namibia
Ian Botting	New Zealand A	England
Callum Braley	England Under 20s	Italy
Donald Brighouse	New Zealand Under 20s	Samoa
Dean Budd	New Zealand Under 19s	Italy
Fergus Burke	New Zealand Under 20s	Scotland
Billy Burns	England Under 20s	Ireland
Luke Carty	Ireland Under 20s	United States
Martín Castrogiovanni	Argentina Under 21s	Italy
Steevy Cerqueira	France Under 20s	Portugal
Antonie Claassen	South Africa Under 19s	France
Jack Cobden	England Under 20s	Romania
Brent Cockbain	Australia Under 21s	Wales
Aranos Coetzee	South Africa Under 18s	Namibia
Thomas Crețu	France Under 20s	Romania
Simon Danielli	England Under 21s	Scotland
Filipo Daugunu	Fiji Under 20s	Australia
Carlo Del Fava	South Africa Under 21s	Italy
Allan Dell	South Africa Under 20s	Scotland (Note: Allan Dell also represented the British Lions.)
Johan Deysel	South Africa Universities	Namibia
Lee Dickson	Scotland Under 19s	England
Pablo Dimcheff	Argentina Under 20s	Italy
Fraser Dingwall	Scotland Under 18s	England
Dustin Dobravsky	Germany Under 18s	Canada
Alex Dombrandt	Wales Under 20s	England
Paul Doran-Jones	Ireland Under 21s	England
Tyler Duguid	Canada Under 20s	France
Cornell du Preez	South Africa Under 20s	Scotland
Andrew Durutalo	Fiji Under 20s	United States
Ere Enari	New Zealand Under 20s	Samoa
Shahn Eru	New Zealand Under 20s	Cook Islands
Thom Evans	England Under 21s	Scotland
Jonny Fa'amatuainu	New Zealand Under 18s	Samoa
Jamason Fa'anana-Schultz	Samoa Under 20s	United States
Paea Fa'anunu	New Zealand Under 20s	Tonga
So'otala Fa'aso'o	New Zealand Schoolboys	Samoa
Hame Faiva	New Zealand Under 20s	Italy
Folau Fakatava	Tonga Under 15s	New Zealand
Daniel Faleafa	New Zealand Under 20s	Tonga
Matt Faleuka	New Zealand Universities	Niue
Dominic Fe'aunati	New Zealand Under 21s	Samoa
Immanuel Feyi-Waboso	Wales Under 18s	England
Vunipola Fifita	Australia Under 20s	Tonga
Thibaud Flament	Belgium Under 18s	France
Tony Flay	New Zealand Under 19s	United States
Perry Freshwater	New Zealand Under 21s	England
Antoine Frisch	Emerging Ireland	France
Shannon Frizell	Tonga Under 20s	New Zealand (Note: Shannon Frizell also represented the Australia–New Zealand XV.)
Leon Fukofuka	New Zealand Under 20s	Tonga
Bastien Fuster	France Under 20s	Spain
John Gallagher	New Zealand (Note: John Gallagher first represented New Zealand at senior level, before later representing Ireland, although never in a senior international fixture for the latter nation.)	Ireland A
Matt Gallagher	England Under 20s	Italy
Gonzalo García	Argentina Under 21s	Italy
Mark Giacheri	Australia Under 21s	Italy
Keith Gleeson	Australia Under 21s	Ireland
Vaughan Going	New Zealand Colts	Hong Kong
Rob Gordon	New Zealand Schoolboys	Japan
Aaron Grandidier-Nkanang	England Counties Under 18s	France (7s)
Sam Greene	(Australia) Australian Schoolboys	Japan
Esei Ha'angana	Australia Under 20s	Japan
Mike Haley	England Saxons	Ireland
Steven Hall	South Africa Under 23s	France
Gabriel Hamer-Webb	England Under 20s	Wales
Jim Hamilton	England Under 21s	Scotland
Luke Hamilton	Wales Under 20s	Scotland
Mack Hansen	Australia Under 20s	Ireland (Note: Mack Hansen also represented the British Lions.)
John Hardie	New Zealand Under 20s	Scotland
Chris Harris	England Counties	Scotland
Mike Harris	New Zealand Under 20s	Australia
Josh Hathaway	England Under 20s	Wales
Sione Havili	New Zealand Schoolboys	Tonga
Ben Healy	Ireland Under 20s	Scotland
Opeti Helu	(Australia) Australian Schoolboys	Japan
Mike Hercus	Australia Under 21s	United States
James Hilterbrand	Australia Under 18s	United States
Dave Hilton	England Under 21s	Scotland
Harry Hockings	Australia Under 20s	Japan
Will Hooley	England Under 20s	United States
Tim Hoyt	England Under 20s	Fiji
George Hunter	Scotland Club XV	(The Bahamas) Bahamas
Hayden Hyde	Ireland Under 20s	England (7s)
TJ Ioane	New Zealand Schoolboys	Samoa
Robert Irimescu	United States Under 23s	Romania
Kane James	England Under 20s	Wales
Benhard Janse van Rensburg	South Africa Under 20s	England
Martin Johnson	New Zealand Under 21s	England (Note: Martin Johnson also represented the British Lions.)
Sam Johnson	(Australia) Australian Schoolboys	Scotland
Oli Kebble	South Africa Under 20s	Scotland
Dan Kelly	Ireland Under 20s	England
Sekope Kepu	New Zealand Under 21s	Australia
Samu Kerevi	Fiji Under 20s	Australia
Jason Keyter	England A	United States
Shilo Klein	New Zealand Under 20s	United States
Caleb Korteweg	New Zealand Under 20s	Netherlands
Tevita Kuridrani	Fiji Under 20s	Australia
Lalomilo Lalomilo	New Zealand Under 20s	Samoa
AJ Lam	New Zealand A (Note: AJ Lam also represented the Australia–New Zealand XV.)	Samoa
Jack Lam	Australia Under 19s	Samoa
Joel Lam	New Zealand Under 20s	Samoa
Seilala Lam	Australia Under 20s	Samoa
Dino Lamb	England Under 20s	Italy
Brendan Laney	New Zealand Under 21s	Scotland
Nili Latu	New Zealand Schoolboys	Tonga
Penikolo Latu	New Zealand Under 20s	Tonga
Sione Lea	New Zealand Schoolboys	Tonga
Tadhg Leader	Ireland Under 20s	United States
George Leaupepe	New Zealand Schoolboys	Samoa
Gus Leger	New Zealand Under 17s	Tonga
Fa'atiga Lemalu	New Zealand Schoolboys	Samoa
Owen Lentz	South Africa Under 21s	United States
Filipo Levi	New Zealand Colts	Samoa
Ezekiel Lindenmuth	New Zealand Under 20s (Note: Ezekiel Lindenmuth also represented the Samoa Under 20s at junior level.)	United States
Siosifa Lisala	Tonga Under 20s	Japan (7s)
Tyrel Lomax	Australia Under 20s	New Zealand
Willie Losʻe	New Zealand Under 21s	Tonga
Kieran Low	England Under 20s	Scotland
Mat Luamanu	New Zealand Under 20s	Samoa
Louis Lynagh	England Under 20s	Italy
Ally Maclay	Scotland Under 21s	Hong Kong
Amanaki Mafi	Tonga Under 20s	Japan
Sitiveni Mafi	Australia Under 21s	Tonga
Tevita Mailau	New Zealand Under 21s	Tonga
Finau Maka	New Zealand Under 21s	Tonga (Note: Finau Maka also represented the Pacific Islanders at senior level.)
Sama Malolo	Australia Under 20s	Samoa
Scott Malolua	Australia Under 20s	Samoa
Daniel Manu	New Zealand Under 21s	Australia
Nasi Manu	New Zealand Under 20s	Tonga
Tevita Manumua	Tonga Under 20s	Romania
Sean Marsden	England Under 21s	Scotland (7s)
Johnny Marsters	New Zealand Colts	Cook Islands
Johnny Matthews	England Counties	Scotland
Otumaka Mausia	New Zealand Under 20s	Tonga
Nathan McBeth	South Africa Under 20s	Scotland
Mike McCarthy	England Under 21s	Ireland
Nick McCarthy	Ireland Under 20s	United States
Andrew McCormick	New Zealand Colts	Japan
Dale McIntosh	Scotland A	Wales
Ian McKinley	Ireland Under 20s	Italy
Luke McLean	Australia Under 21s	Italy
Sean McNulty	Ireland Under 20s	United States
Zach Mercer	Scotland Under 16s	England
Elliot Millar-Mills	England Counties	Scotland
Andrew Miller	New Zealand Colts	Japan
Izaiha Moore-Aiono	England Under 20s	Samoa
Kurt Morath	New Zealand Under 21s	Tonga
Ross Moriarty	England Under 20s	Wales
Joris Moura	France Under 20s	Portugal
Tendai Mtawarira	Zimbabwe Under 18s	South Africa
Paul Mullen	Emerging Ireland	United States
Blair Murray	New Zealand Schoolboys	Wales
Nemani Nadolo	Australia Under 20s	Fiji
Noa Nakaitaci	Fiji Under 20s	France
Brandon Nansen	New Zealand Schoolboys	Samoa
Peter Nelson	Emerging Ireland	Canada
Ivan Nemer	Argentina Under 20s	Italy
Wayne Ngaluafe	New Zealand Under 19s	Tonga
Milton Ngauamo	New Zealand Under 21s	Tonga
Paul Ngauamo	New Zealand Under 20s	Tonga
Paolo Odogwu	England Under 20s	Italy
Viliami Ofahengaue	New Zealand Schoolboys	Australia
Andy Onyeama-Christie	England Under 20s	Scotland
Manu Paea	New Zealand Under 20s	Tonga
Duncan Paia'aua	Australia Under 20s	Samoa
Hunter Paisami	Samoa Under 20s	Australia
Fosi Pala'amo	Australia Under 21s	Samoa
Victor Paquet	France Under 19s	Belgium
Hadleigh Parkes	New Zealand Schoolboys	Wales
Ti'i Paulo	New Zealand Under 21s	Samoa
Jared Payne	New Zealand Under 21s	Ireland (Note: Jared Payne also represented the British Lions.)
Apollo Perelini	New Zealand Under 21s	Samoa
Eric Peters	England Under 21s	Scotland
Greg Peterson	Australia Under 20s	United States
Matthew Phillips	New Zealand Under 21s	Italy
Kapeli Pifeleti	England Under 19s	United States
Vincent Pinto	France Under 20s	Portugal
George Pisi	New Zealand Under 21s	Samoa
Ken Pisi	New Zealand Schoolboys	Samoa
Tusi Pisi	New Zealand Under 21s	Samoa (Note: Tusi Pisi also represented the Pacific Islanders at senior level.)
Taine Plumtree	New Zealand Under 20s	Wales
Budge Pountney	England Under 21s	Scotland
Bader Pretorius	South Africa Under 18s	Germany
Ian Prior	Australia Under 20s	Zimbabwe
Esera Puleitu	New Zealand Schoolboys	Samoa
John Quill	(Ireland) Irish Schoolboys	United States
Simon Raiwalui	(Australia) Australian Schoolboys	Fiji (Note: Simon Raiwalui also represented the Pacific Islanders at senior level.)
Harry Randall	Wales Under 16s	England
Waisake Raratubua	Fiji Under 20s	Japan
Clyde Rathbone	South Africa Under 21s	Australia
Jacob Rauluni	(Australia) Australian Schoolboys	Fiji
Mosese Rauluni	Australia Under 19s	Fiji (Note: Mosese Rauluni also represented the Pacific Islanders at senior level.)
Cameron Redpath	England Under 20s	Scotland
Arron Reed	England Under 20s	Scotland
Roland Reid	South Africa Under 19s	Scotland
Dylan Richardson	South Africa Under 20s	Scotland
Dylan Riley	Australia Under 20s	Japan
Glen Rolls	New Zealand Under 17s	Spain
Romi Ropati	New Zealand Colts	Samoa
Jody Rose	(South Africa) Emerging Springboks	Romania
Tom Ryder	England Under 21s	Scotland
Radike Samo	Fiji Under 19s	Australia
Male Sa'u	New Zealand Under 21s	Japan
JP Sauni	New Zealand Under 20s	Samoa
Pierre Schoeman	South Africa Under 20s	Scotland (Note: Pierre Schoeman also represented the British Lions.)
Javan Sebastian	Wales Under 18s	Scotland
Anton Segner	Germany Under 16s	New Zealand
Atila Septar	France Under 20s	Romania
Steven Setephano	New Zealand Under 21s	Cook Islands
UJ Seuteni	Australia Under 20s	Samoa
Tommy Seymour	Ireland Under 19s	Scotland
Robbie Shaw	Ireland Under 21s	United States
Callum Sheedy	England A (Note: Callum Sheedy also represented the Ireland Under 19s at junior level.)	Wales
Brad Shields	New Zealand Under 20s	England
Gordon Simpson	New Zealand Under 21s	Scotland
Dave Sisi	England Under 20s	Italy
Will Skelton	Samoa Under 20s	Australia
Sam Skinner	England Under 20s	Scotland
Sam Slade	New Zealand Under 20s	Samoa
Ian Smith	England B	Scotland
JP Smith	South Africa Under 20s	United States
Moses Sorovi	Australia Under 20s	Fiji
Mike Sosene-Feagai	Samoa Under 20s	United States
Waisake Sotutu	New Zealand Schoolboys	Fiji
Scott Spedding	South Africa Under 21s	France
Henry Speight	Fiji Under 19s	Australia
Warren Spragg	England Under 21s	Italy
CJ Stander	South Africa Under 20s	Ireland
Tom Staniforth	Australia Under 20s	France
Michael Stanley	England Under 20s	Samoa
Winston Stanley	New Zealand Under 20s	Samoa
Matt Stevens	South Africa Under 19s	England (Note: Matt Stevens also represented the British Lions.)
Braam Steyn	South Africa Under 20s	Italy
Michael Stolberg	Australia National Academy	Japan
Henry Stowers	New Zealand Under 20s	Samoa
Richardt Strauss	South Africa Under 19s	Ireland
Jeremy Su'a	Australia Under 20s	Samoa
Henry Taefu	Australia Under 20s	Samoa
Latu Talakai	New Zealand Under 20s	Tonga
Ben Tameifuna	New Zealand Under 20s	Tonga
Richard Tardits	France Under 21s	United States
Jordan Taufua	New Zealand Under 20s	Samoa
Samisoni Taukei'aho	Tonga Under 15s	New Zealand
Jonathan Taumateine	New Zealand Under 20s	Samoa
Afusipa Taumoepeau	Australia Under 20s	Tonga
Timoci Tavatavanawai	Fiji Under 20s	New Zealand
Sione Teaupa	Tonga Under 20s	Japan
Freddie Thomas	England Under 20s	Wales
Kane Thompson	New Zealand Under 21s	Samoa
Danny Toala	New Zealand Under 20s	Samoa
Senio Toleafoa	Australia Under 20s	Samoa
Jason Tomane	Australia Under 17s	Romania
Nick Tompkins	England Saxons	Wales
Soane Tonga'uiha	New Zealand Under 21s	Tonga (Note: Soane Tonga'uiha also represented the Pacific Islanders at senior level.)
Ben Toolis	Australia National Academy	Scotland
Hale T-Pole	New Zealand Under 21s	Tonga (Note: Hale T-Pole also represented the Pacific Islanders at senior level.)
Kieran Treadwell	England Under 20s	Ireland
Ahsee Tuala	New Zealand Under 20s	Samoa
Sione Tui	Australia Under 20s	Tonga
Sione Tuipulotu (born February 1997)	Australia Under 20s	Scotland (Note: Sione Tuipulotu also represented the British Lions.)
Sione Tuipulotu (born December 1997)	Samoa Under 20s	Tonga
Tane Tu'ipulotu	New Zealand Under 21s	Pacific Islanders (Note: Tane Tu'ipulotu played for the Pacific Islanders at senior level, but never played for any of the national teams represented by the Islanders (Fiji, Samoa and Tonga).)
Malo Tuitama	New Zealand Under 20s	Japan
Jimmy Tupou	New Zealand Under 20s	Tonga
Taniela Tupou	Tonga Under 15s	Australia
Alisi Tupuailei	New Zealand Under 21s	Japan
Mathew Turner	South Africa Under 20s	England (7s)
Epineri Uluiviti	Fiji Under 18s	Japan
Seru Uru	Fiji Under 20s	Australia (Note: Seru Uru also represented the Australia–New Zealand XV.)
Gerhard van den Heever	South Africa Under 20s	Japan
Duhan van der Merwe	South Africa Under 20s	Scotland (Note: Duhan van der Merwe also represented the British Lions.)
Jaco van der Walt	South Africa Under 18s	Scotland
Telusa Veainu	New Zealand Under 20s	Tonga
Paul Vegar	New Zealand Under 18s	Croatia
Daniel Vickerman	South Africa Under 21s	Australia
Thibault Visensang	France Under 20s	Spain
Tim Visser	England Under 18s	Scotland
Ben Volavola	Australia Under 20s	Fiji
Chris Vui	New Zealand Under 20s	Samoa
Manu Vunipola	England Under 20s	Tonga
Samuela Vunisa	Fiji Under 20s	Italy
Nicholas Wallace	Canada Under 20s	United States
Peter Walton	England Under 19s	Scotland
Gus Warr	England Under 20s	Scotland
Shaun Webb	New Zealand Under 21s	Japan
Ben White	England Under 20s	Scotland
Dave Whiteford	Scotland Under 21s	Hong Kong
Paul Willemse	South Africa Under 20s (Note: Paul Willemse also represented the Namibia Under 18s at junior level.)	France
Daryl Williams	New Zealand Colts	Samoa
Johnny Williams	England Under 20s	Wales
Murray Williams	New Zealand Under 19s	Japan
Paul Williams	New Zealand Under 19s	Samoa
Takaji Young Yen	New Zealand Universities	United States
Loris Zarantonello	France Under 20s	Italy

== Rugby union players who have represented two nations – female players (senior level) ==
Name	First nation	Second nation
Jo Brown	England	Ireland
Mackenzie Carson	Canada	England
Kennedy Cherrington	Australia (7s)	(Māori people) New Zealand Māori (RL)
Kiritapu Demant	New Zealand (RU)	Cook Islands (RL)
Ruahei Demant	Cook Islands (RL)	New Zealand (RU)
Tiffany Fa'ae'e	Samoa (RL) (Note: Tiffany Fa'ae'e also represented New Zealand in rugby league.)	United States (RU)
Debbie Francis	England	Scotland
Eloise Hayward	England (7s)	Wales (RU)
Mele Hufanga	Tonga (RU)	New Zealand (RL)
Amelia Kuk	Papua New Guinea (7s)	Australia (RL)
Rimma Lewis	Russia	Scotland
Nathalie Marchino	United States (RU)	Colombia (7s)
Shannon Mato	Australia (RU)	(Māori people) New Zealand Māori (RL)
Caity Mattinson	England	Scotland
Nita Maynard-Perrin	Australia (RU)	New Zealand (RL)
Raecene McGregor	Australia (7s)	New Zealand (RL)
Sarah Mimnagh	(United Kingdom) British Army	Ireland
Toka Natua	New Zealand (RU)	Cook Islands (RL)
Te Kura Ngata-Aerengamate	New Zealand (RU)	Cook Islands (RL)
Apii Nicholls-Pualau	Cook Islands (7s)	New Zealand (RL)
Clara Nielson	England	Ireland
Christabelle Onesemo-Tuilaepa	New Zealand (RL)	Samoa (RU)
Demielle Onesemo-Tuilaepa	New Zealand (RL)	Samoa (RU)
Lucy Packer	Wales (7s)	England (RU)
Lorina Papali'i	New Zealand (RL)	Samoa (RU)
Shanice Parker	Australia (RU)	New Zealand (RL)
Tiana Penitani	Australia (7s)	Tonga (RL)
Ellena Perry	England	Ireland
Pauline Piliae-Rasabale	Australia (RU)	Samoa (RL)
Asinate Serevi	United States	Fiji
Lotte Sharp	England	United States
Cynthia Ta'ala	New Zealand (RL)	Samoa (RU)
Sosoli Talawadua	New Zealand	Samoa
Sui Tauaua-Pauaraisa	New Zealand (RL)	Samoa (RU)
Amy Turner	Australia (7s)	(Māori people) New Zealand Māori (RL)
Langi Veainu	New Zealand (RU)	Tonga (RL)
Niall Williams-Guthrie	New Zealand (7s)	Samoa (RL)
Carys Williams-Morris	England	Wales

== Rugby union players who have represented two nations – female players (junior to senior) ==
Name	First nation	Second nation
Katherine Baverstock	England Under 20s	Wales
Beth Blacklock	England National Academy	Scotland
Carys Cox	England Under 20s	Wales
Hollie Cunningham	England Under 20s	Scotland
Jenny Hesketh	England Under 20s	Wales
Nancy McGillivray	England Under 20s (Note: Nancy McGillivray also represented Hong Kong Under 18s at junior level.)	Ireland
Fiona McIntosh	England Under 20s	Scotland
Isla Norman-Bell	New Zealand Development (7s)	England (7s) (Note: Isla Norman-Bell also represented Great Britain in rugby sevens.)
Anna-Lucia Scott	England Under 18s	Scotland

== See also ==
- International rugby union eligibility rules
- List of dual-code rugby internationals
- List of players who have converted from one football code to another
