= Frederic Gateretse-Ngoga =

Burundian diplomat (born 1979)

Ambassador Frederic Gateretse-Ngoga
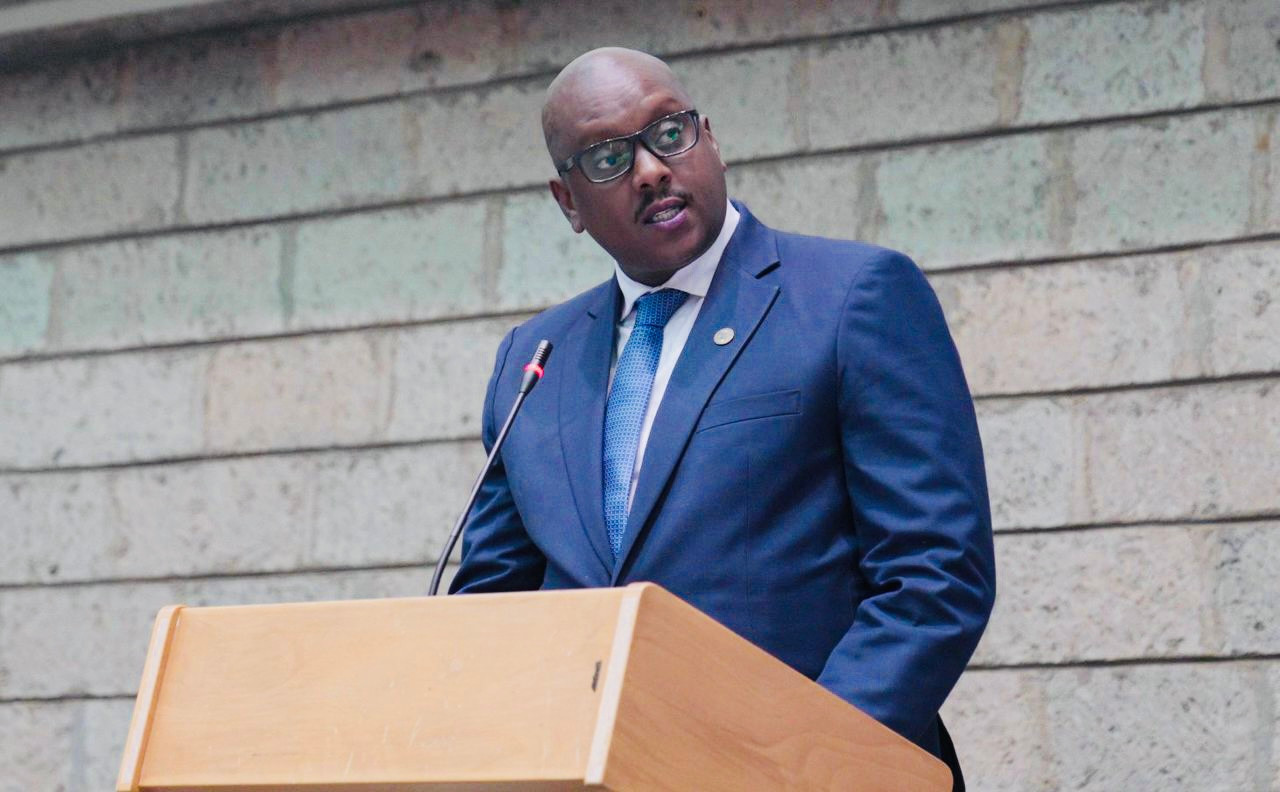

Ambassador extraordinary and plenipotentiary of the Republic of Burundi
- Incumbent
- Assumed office 16 April 2014

African Union senior advisor on international partnerships

Personal details
- Born: Frederic Gateretse-Ngoga; 23 July 1979 (age 46) Bujumbura, Burundi
- Education: Harvard Kennedy School; University of Pennsylvania; Suffolk University
- Profession: Diplomat

Frederic Gateretse-Ngoga (born 23 July 1979) is a Burundian diplomat who is currently the senior advisor on international partnerships, the AU Border Program, and regional security mechanisms in the office of the Commissioner for Political Affairs and Peace and Security of the African Union Commission. He was appointed on 16 April 2014 as Ambassador Extraordinary and Plenipotentiary of the Republic of Burundi.

== Early life and education ==
As a child of a diplomat, ambassador Fred Ngoga grew up across the world. Between the ages of 4 and 15 he lived on three continents and schooled in Quebec City, New York City, Brussels, Bujumbura and Nantes.

Ngoga attended the University of Pennsylvania, Suffolk University and Harvard Kennedy School. He holds a Master in Public Administration and an Executive Masters in Managing Peace and Security in Africa. He received professional training on peacekeeping and international security with the African Centre for the Research and Study on Terrorism in Algeria (ACSRT) and with the British Army's Defence Intelligence and Security Centre (DISC) in Chicksands, United Kingdom. He also received training in the Defense against Terrorism from NATO and climate sensitive programming for sustaining peace from the UN, the National Defense University's ACSS Course on Fighting Terrorism and participated in 22nd Forum on the African Continent (FICA) from Institut des Hautes Études de Défense (IHEDN) in Paris, France .

== Career ==
Before joining the African Union Mission to Somalia, Ambassador Ngoga was a regional manager for Africa with iJET Intelligence Risks, a US based provider of operational risk management solutions. He also worked as an Africa security analyst for TranSecur and for Solutions for Progress Inc in Philadelphia, where he assisted in the research for the book 'Raise the Floor – Wages and Policies That Work for All of Us', by Holly Sklar and Laryssa Mykyta.

From 2009 to 2014 he served as a senior officer with the African Union Mission to Somalia (AMISOM) where he assisted operational teams from the Military, Civilian and Police components to provide support on Counter Terrorism and in the planning of military operations in line with AMISOM's mandate.

From 2014 to 2021 he was the head of the conflict prevention and early warning division in the Peace and Security Department. The Division included the Continental Early Warning System, the Panel of the Wise and the AU Border Program. He worked to enhance the AU's ability to do Early Warning, assisted Member States to address structural vulnerabilities. He worked on better equipping preventive diplomats and assisted to strengthen national capabilities to respond to prevent violent conflicts. During his tenure a strong emphasis was put on building stronger partnerships with regional and sub-regional organizations in the area of conflict prevention.

With a strong interest in Institutional capacity, governance, regional and international partnerships, counter terrorism, climate peace and security, he has also worked on the crises in Libya, Sahel, Central African Republic and the Horn of Africa. In 2019 he was part of the secretariat that worked on the CAR Global Agreement for Peace and National Reconciliation signed on 6 February in Khartoum, Sudan.

He is a board member of the UNDP Preventing and Responding to Violent Extremism in Africa project, board Member of UNDP Africa Borderlands Centre (ABC), member of the steering Committee of the Bilalo Byetu "our bridges"project of the UNDP/ElMan Center. He is also a board Member of Med-or-Foundation and a member of the International Commission on Inclusive Peace. In 2024, Ngoga was appointed as the President of the Commission on Sponsorship and Marketing of the Burundi Rugby Federation.

== Personal life ==
He is fully bilingual French and English.

== Publications ==
- Towards a Renewed AU-UN Partnership: Financing of African Union Led Peace Support Operations
- Fighting Terrorism in Africa: The Need for a Reset
- Climate, Peace and Security and the Need for a Coordinated Approach/
- As the world fractures, Africa must end conflict and boost cooperation
- Can A New ‘Social Peace’ Approach Resolve The Continent's Conflicts?
- Navigating the Red Sea: Addressing threats and harnessing potential
