= 1999 Rugby World Cup – Africa qualification =

The Confederation of African Rugby was allotted one place in the 1999 Rugby World Cup by direct qualification (Africa 1) and one place in the repechage tournament. This was in addition to the automatic qualifying place granted to South Africa as champions of the 1995 tournament.

Nine teams participated in the qualification tournament for Africa which was held in four stages. The first two stages (Rounds 1 and 2) were played in 1997 and the last two stages (Rounds 3 and 4) were played in 1998.

The three lowest ranked sides played a single round robin tournament (drawn for home or away), with top placed team progressing to the next round and the other two teams dropping out. Rounds two and three were played in a similar fashion – the three lowest ranked remaining sides (i.e. the winner of the previous round and the next two lowest ranked teams) played a single round robin tournament (drawn for home or away).

The final stage changed the pattern in that the top two teams from round three progressed to round four, and all matches were played in Rabat, Morocco. A four team single round robin was played and Namibia secured the (Africa 1) qualification for RWC 1999 as the top placed side, with Morocco in second place progressing to the repechage.

== Round 1 ==
Pos	Team	Pld	W	D	L	PF	PA	PD	Pts
1	Arabian Gulf	2	2	0	0	97	43	+54	6
2	Zambia	2	1	0	1	50	57	−7	4
3	Botswana	2	0	0	2	26	73	−47	2

Match Results
Date	Home	Score	Away	Venue
18 Apr 1997	Arabian Gulf	53–13	Botswana	Manama, Bahrain
26 Apr 1997	Zambia	30–44	Arabian Gulf	Luanshya, Zambia
17 May 1997	Botswana	13–20	Zambia	Gaborone, Botswana

== Round 2 ==
Pos	Team	Pld	W	D	L	PF	PA	PD	Pts
1	Tunisia	2	1	0	1	63	17	+46	4
2	Arabian Gulf	2	1	0	1	30	48	−18	4
3	Kenya	2	1	0	1	42	70	−28	4

Date	Team #1	Score	Team #2	Venue
13 June 1997	Arabian Gulf	12–11	Tunisia	Manama, Bahrain
6 September 1997	Kenya	37–18	Arabian Gulf	Nairobi, Kenya
20 September 1997	Tunisia	52–5	Kenya	Tunis, Tunisia

== Round 3 ==
Pos	Team	Pld	W	D	L	PF	PA	PD	Pts
1	Zimbabwe	2	1	0	1	69	41	+28	4
2	Namibia	2	1	0	1	49	46	+3	4
3	Tunisia	2	1	0	1	29	60	−31	4

Date	Team #1	Score	Team #2	Venue
4 April 1998	Zimbabwe	43–9	Tunisia	Bulawayo, Zimbabwe
18 April 1998	Tunisia	20–17	Namibia	Tunis, Tunisia
9 May 1998	Namibia	32–26	Zimbabwe	Windhoek, Namibia

== Round 4 ==
All round 4 matches were held in Rabat, Morocco.

Pos	Team	Pld	W	D	L	PF	PA	PD	Pts
1	Namibia	3	3	0	0	78	32	+46	9
2	Morocco	3	2	0	1	29	29	0	7
3	Zimbabwe	3	1	0	2	55	54	+1	5
4	Ivory Coast	3	0	0	3	13	60	−47	3

Date	Team #1	Score	Team No. 2
12 September 1998	Morocco	15–9	Zimbabwe
12 September 1998	Namibia	22–10	Côte d'Ivoire
16 September 1998	Zimbabwe	32–0	Côte d'Ivoire
16 September 1998	Morocco	8–17	Namibia
19 September 1998	Namibia	39–14	Zimbabwe
19 September 1998	Morocco	6–3	Côte d'Ivoire

Namibia qualified for RWC 1999, Morocco qualified for repechage.
