= Korea Rugby Union =

Sports governing body in South Korea

대한럭비협회
- Sport: Rugby union
- Founded: 1946; 80 years ago
- World Rugby affiliation: November 1988; 37 years ago
- Asia Rugby affiliation: 1968; 58 years ago
- Headquarters: 424 Olympic-ro, Songpa-gu, Seoul
- President: Shim Young Bock
- Website: www.rugby.or.kr

The Korea Rugby Union (KRU) is the governing body for rugby union in South Korea. It was founded in 1946, and become a member of World Rugby (known as International Rugby Football Board at the time) in November 1988. The KRU was the fifth Asian rugby union to be founded, after Ceylon (Sri Lanka; 1908), Malaya (Malaysia; 1921), Japan (1926) and Thailand (1937).

== Teams ==
- South Korea – Men's national team
- South Korea sevens – Men's national rugby seven-a-side team
- South Korea women's sevens – Women's national rugby seven-a-side team

== See also ==
- Rugby union in South Korea
- Sport in South Korea
- Korea Super Rugby League
