= Burkina Faso Rugby Federation =

Fédération Burkinabè de Rugby
- Sport: Rugby union
- Founded: 1992
- World Rugby affiliation: 2018
- Rugby Africa affiliation: 2006
- Website: fburkinarugby.com

The Burkina Faso Rugby Federation (French: Fédération Burkinabè de Rugby) is the governing body for rugby union in Burkina Faso. It was founded in 1992 and organises and oversees local and international rugby involving Burkina Faso. The Burkina Faso Rugby Federation became affiliated to Rugby Africa in 2006. It became an associate member of World Rugby in 2018 and was voted a full member in 2020.

== Notable former players ==
- (Wales) Steffen Williams
