= Mali Rugby Federation =

Mali governing body for rugby union

The Mali Rugby Federation (French: Fédération Malienne de Rugby) is the governing body for rugby union in Mali. It is a member of the Rugby Africa and an associate member of the World Rugby.
