= Rugby Union of Slovenia =

Rugby zveza Slovenije
- Sport: Rugby union
- Founded: 1988; 37 years ago
- World Rugby affiliation: 1996
- Rugby Europe affiliation: 1992
- President: Goran Djuratović
- Men's coach: Tihomir Jankovic
- Women's coach: Mirsad Pejkovič (sevens)

The Rugby Union of Slovenia (Slovene: Rugby zveza Slovenije) is the governing body for rugby in Slovenia. It oversees the various national teams and the development of the sport.

== Leadership ==
Position	Name
President	Goran Djuratović
Vice President	Andraž Kramer
Vice President	Damjan Volavšek
Vice President	Marko Babnik
Vice President	Samo Peter Medved
Treasurer	Ivan Šček
Secretary	Aleksander Jug
Technical Director	Robert Puconja

== See also ==
- Rugby union in Slovenia
- Slovenia national rugby union team
