= Tiffany Faʻaeʻe =

NZ & Samoa international rugby league & US international rugby union player

Personal information
- Born: November 14, 1982 (age 43)
- Height: 1.73 m (5 ft 8 in)
- Weight: 92 kg (203 lb; 14 st 7 lb)

Playing information
Representative
Years	Team	Pld	T	G	FG	P
2011	Samoa
2014	New Zealand

Rugby union career
- Position: Prop
Amateur team(s)
Years	Team	Apps	(Points)
–	Ponsonby Auckland		
2013-2017	New York RFC		
International career
Years	Team	Apps	(Points)
2015-	United States	10	(0)
Coaching career
- Years: Team
- 2018-: Rugby United New York
- 2017-: Monroe College (M&W)
- 2017-: New York RFC
- 2023 -: Locals Premier Rugby 7s

Karameli Tiffany Faʻaeʻe (born November 14, 1982) is an American rugby union player. She debuted for the United States in 2016. She captained the US Eagles to the 2017 Women's Rugby World Cup in Ireland. She competed at the 2017 Can-Am Series.

Faʻaeʻe has represented Samoa and New Zealand in rugby league. She played most of her rugby in New Zealand. She moved to the United States in 2013.

In 2018, Faeʻaeʻe signed as an assistant coach of Rugby United New York, a Major League Rugby expansion team.
