= Tanzania Rugby Union =

Rugby governing body in Tanzania

The Tanzania Rugby Union is the governing body for rugby union in Tanzania. It is a member of the Confederation of African Rugby (CAR) and an associate member of the International Rugby Board.
