= Uzbekistan Rugby Federation =

Sports governing body in Uzbekistan

O'zbekiston Regbi Federatsiyasi
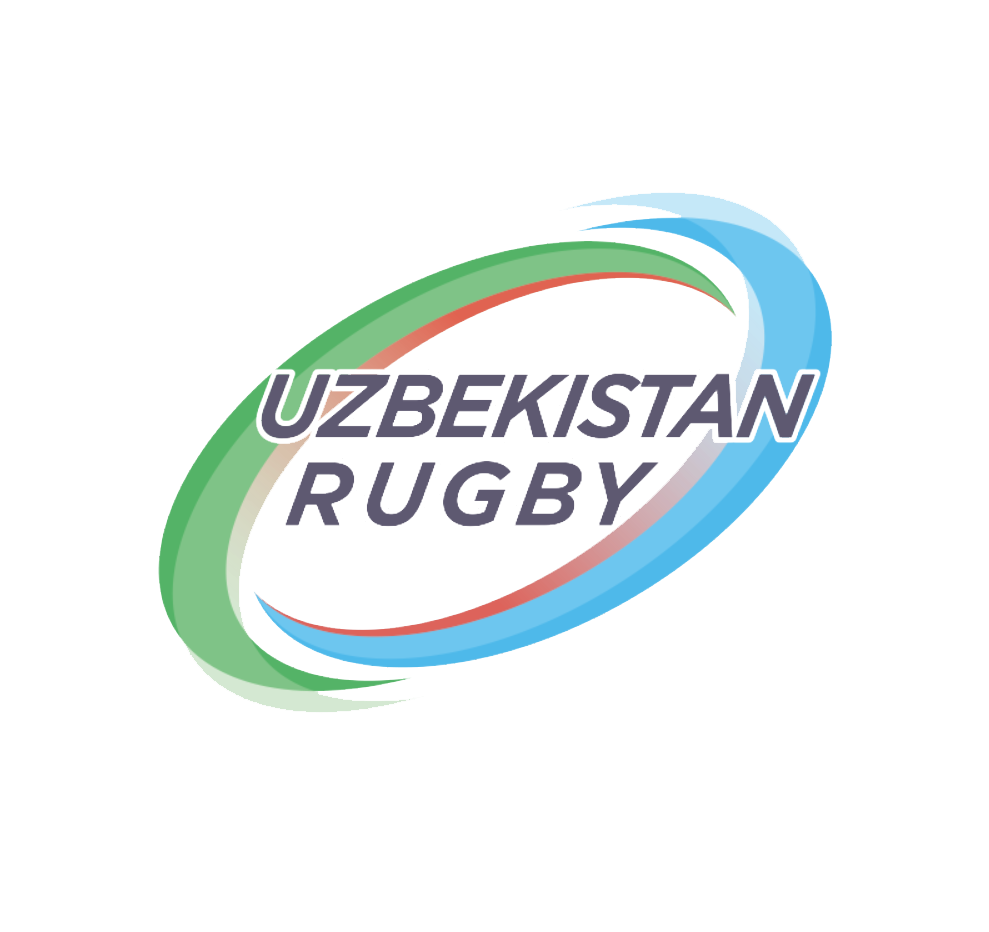
- Sport: Rugby union
- Founded: 2002
- World Rugby affiliation: 2014
- Asia Rugby Union affiliation: 2002
- Headquarters: Uzbekistan, Tashkent
- President: Sodiq Safoyev
- Secretary General: Kakhramon Djalilov
- Website: https://rugby.uz

The Uzbekistan Rugby Federation (Uzbek: O'zbekiston Regbi Federatsiyasi) is the governing body for rugby union in Uzbekistan. The Rugby Federation of Uzbekistan was established in 2002, becoming a full member of ARFU (Asian Rugby Football Union) and full member of World Rugby (then called IRB).

The Rugby 7's National Championship of Uzbekistan is regularly held among men's and women's teams. From 2011 for the first time in 20 years a regular 15-a-side Rugby National Championship was started, for men's teams, which involved six teams:

- Ajax Rugby club (tashkent)
- Tashkent Lions
- Qanot Rugby club
- National University of Uzbekistan
- Aviator
- Yangiyer
- Shifokor (Medical University)

In 2012 the men's national team participated in an international rugby sevens tournament in Lahore (Pakistan), among the strongest teams in Asia, as well as invited teams from Ireland and New Zealand. The team came third, losing only to New Zealand and Ireland.

The women's national team was a bronze medallist at Rugby-15 championship in 2008

With Rugby 7s announced as an Olympic discipline from 2016, the URF is confidently focused on getting a licence to have a women's team participate in the Olympic Games in Rio de Janeiro.

The men's team participates in the annual "Asia Rugby Championship" (formerly the "Asian Five Nations" tournament). In 2015, the team competes in Division III South-Central.

In the 2013 Championship, four teams participated:

- West Tigers (Westminster International University in Tashkent)
- National University of Uzbekistan
- Aviator
- Yangiyer

== Teams ==
- Uzbekistan - the national men's rugby union team.
- 7s - the national men's rugby union seven-a-side team.

== See also ==
- Rugby union in Uzbekistan
- Sports in Uzbekistan
