= Rugby Africa =

Administrative body for rugby union in Africa

- Rugby Afrique
- Logo introduced in 2018
- Formation: 1986 as CAR 2014 Rugby Africa
- Type: Sports federation
- Headquarters: Tunis
- Members: 37 unions
- President: GRA Herbert Mensah
- Vice President: URU Andrew Owor
- Treasurer: FIR Dr Elvis Tano
- Secretary: SARU Jurie Roux
- Affiliations: World Rugby
- Website: rugbyafrique.com

Rugby Africa is the administrative body for rugby union within the continent of Africa under the authority of World Rugby, which is the world governing body of rugby union. As of 2018, Rugby Africa has 37 member nations and runs several rugby union tournaments for national teams, including the Africa Cup which is the main 15-a-side competition for African national teams.

Rugby Africa was founded in 1986 as the Confederation of African Rugby (CAR) to promote, develop, organise and administer the game of rugby union in Africa. It was renamed Rugby Africa in December 2014.

The President of Rugby Africa is the Herbert Mensah from Ghana.

== History ==
Logo used 2015–2017.

The Confederation of African Rugby (French: Confédération Africaine de Rugby) was officially launched in January 1986 in Tunis. The inaugural members at the meeting were Ivory Coast, Kenya, Madagascar, Morocco, Senegal, the Seychelles, Tanzania and Tunisia. A meeting was held in July 1992 in Casablanca with the view of integrating the SARFU into the confederation. South Africa had been denied entry until this time because of the government policy of apartheid (South African rugby union had been governed by the mainly white South African Rugby Board and the mainly black South African Rugby Union). In March 1992 these were formally combined to form the South African Rugby Football Union (SARFU). The Confederation now has 37 member nations.

=== African Rugby Charter ===
The African Rugby Charter was signed by the President of CAR, Abdelaziz Bougja, the then President of the South African Rugby Union (SARFU) Brian van Rooyen, in the presence of former South African president Nelson Mandela, and the South African Minister of Sport, Makhenkesi Stofile.

We, the undersigned, hereby confirm our commitment to realising the potential of African rugby...
THAT, on this day, the creation of the African Leopards, Rugby Union in Africa will develop its own heroes and heroines;
THAT, developing rugby nations throughout Africa will be assisted with adequate human and physical resources to develop their playing potential at all levels;
THAT, every African boy and girl may soon have the opportunity to play the sport of Rugby Football.

— Signed on this 23rd day of July, 2005 at Johannesburg, South Africa.

== Members ==
World Rugby full members who are part of Rugby Africa:

- Algeria (2021)
- Botswana (1994)
- Burkina Faso (2020)
- Burundi (2021)
- Cameroon (1999) (Note: Cameroon joined World Rugby as a full member in 1999, but had their membership suspended in November 2013 due to "inactivity and a failure to meet criteria for continued membership". It became a full member again in 2021.)
- Ghana (2004) (Note: Ghana joined World Rugby as an associate member in 2004, and became a full member in 2017.)
- (Ivory Coast) Ivory Coast (1988)
- Egypt (2024)
- Kenya (1990)
- Lesotho (2024)
- Madagascar (1998)
- Mauritius (2009)
- Morocco (1988)
- Namibia (1990)
- Nigeria (2001)
- Rwanda (2004) (Note: Rwanda joined World Rugby as an associate member in 2004, and became a full member in 2015.)
- Senegal (1999)
- South Africa (1949)
- Eswatini (1998)
- Tunisia (1988)
- Uganda (1997)
- Zambia (1995)
- Zimbabwe (1987)

World Rugby associate members who are part of Rugby Africa:

- Tanzania (2004)
- Togo (2004)
- Mali (2004)

World Rugby non-members who are part of Rugby Africa (full or affiliate member):

- Benin
- (Central African Republic) Central Africa
- Chad
- Congo
- DR Congo
- Gabon
- Guinea
- Malawi
- Mozambique
- Niger
- Seychelles
- Sierra Leone

World Rugby suspended members who are part of Rugby Africa:

- Mauritania (2003) (Note: Mauritania joined World Rugby as a full member in 2003, but had their membership suspended in November 2013 due to "inactivity and a failure to meet criteria for continued membership".)

Non-member countries working with the governing body (Rugby Africa non-members too):

- Cape Verde
- Comoros
- Ethiopia
- Libya
- Mayotte (Note: Mayotte is an overseas region of France and rugby is governed by a committee of the World Rugby-affiliated French Rugby Federation.)
- Réunion (Note: Réunion is an overseas region of France and rugby is governed by a committee of the World Rugby-affiliated French Rugby Federation.)

Defunct African National Rugby Union Teams

- East Africa (1950-1982) (combined players from Kenya, Uganda, and Tanzania)
- Nyasaland (1930s) (now Malawi)
- Rhodesia (1910-1979) (now Zimbabwe)
- Zaire (1971-1997) (Now Democratic Republic of the Congo)

== World Rugby Rankings ==
Men's World Rugby Rankings (as of 2 January 2023)
Africa*	World Rugby	+/-	National Team	Points
1	4	Steady	South Africa	88.97
2	21	Steady	Namibia	61.6
3	33	Steady	Zimbabwe	52.43
4	34	Steady	Kenya	51.79
5	38	Steady	Tunisia	48.55
6	43	▲1	Uganda	47.25
7	44	▲1	Madagascar	46.89
8	48	▲1	Morocco	46.33
9	49	▲1	Ivory Coast	46.24
10	56	▼1	Senegal	43.22
11	69	Steady	Zambia	38.83
12	70	Steady	Nigeria	38.37
13	73	Steady	Algeria	36.25
14	74	Steady	Botswana	36.21
15	86	Steady	Ghana	33.27
16	91	Steady	Burkina Faso	31.05
17	93	Steady	Mauritius	30.56
18	96	Steady	Rwanda	29.78
19	101	Steady	Burundi	26.16
20	102	Steady	Eswatini	26.04
21	104	Steady	Cameroon	23.12
*Local rankings based on World Rugby ranking points

Women's World Rugby Rankings (as of 2 January 2023)
Africa*	World Rugby	+/-	National Team	Points
1	13	Steady	South Africa	64.5
2	25	Steady	Kenya	45.26
3	27	Steady	Madagascar	44.89
4	28	Steady	Cameroon	43.45
5	33	Steady	Tunisia	40.53
6	35	Steady	Uganda	40.48
7	37	Steady	Zambia	39.95
8	39	Steady	Senegal	39.16
9	41	Steady	Ivory Coast	38.92
10	46	Steady	Zimbabwe	37.04
11	52	Steady	Burkina Faso	35.32
12	54	Steady	Botswana	33.3
13	57	Steady	Namibia	32.14
*Local rankings based on World Rugby ranking points

== Competitions ==
Tournaments run by Rugby Africa include:

Senior Men
Men XV

- Rugby Africa Cup
  - Rugby Africa Gold Cup
  - Rugby Africa Silver Cup
  - Rugby Africa Bronze Cup
- African Development Trophy

Men VII

- Africa Men's Sevens

Senior Women
Women XV

- Rugby Africa Women's Cup
  - Rugby Africa Women's Cup Division 1

Women VII

- Africa Women's Sevens

Youth
Men XV

- U20 Barthés Trophy

== Development programs ==
The CAR formed agreements in 2014 which allowed member unions from Anglophone and Francophone nations in Africa to access training programs within the sports academies and administrative headquarters of the South African Rugby Union and French Rugby Federation, respectively. These agreements, designed to foster rugby union development across the continent, were signed in January 2015, and followed earlier arrangements with the SARU and French club Castres Olympique which were made in 2006.

== Leopards ==
The African Leopards are a representative team from Africa which aims to promote the sport throughout the whole of Africa. The Leopards played their first ever match in July 2005 at Ellis Park as a curtain raiser between Springboks and Australia.

== World Cup qualifying ==
Rugby Africa nations participate in qualifying tournaments for the Rugby World Cup every four years. Four Rugby Africa nations – Ivory Coast, Namibia, South Africa and Zimbabwe – have qualified to play in Rugby World Cups.

Tournament	Automatically qualified	Qualified via competition	Qualified via repechage	Eliminated in repechage	Eliminated at final stage	Eliminated at third stage	Eliminated at second stage	Eliminated at first stage	Eliminated at preliminary round
1987	Zimbabwe	—N/a	—N/a	—N/a	—N/a	—N/a	—N/a	—N/a	—N/a
1991	—N/a	Zimbabwe	—N/a	—N/a	Tunisia; Morocco; Ivory Coast	—N/a	—N/a	—N/a	—N/a
1995	South Africa	Ivory Coast	—N/a	—N/a	Namibia; Morocco; Zimbabwe	—N/a	—N/a	Kenya; Tunisia	—N/a
1999	South Africa	Namibia	—N/a	Morocco	Zimbabwe; Ivory Coast	Tunisia	Kenya	Zambia; Botswana	—N/a
2003	South Africa	Namibia	—N/a	Tunisia	—N/a	Morocco; Zimbabwe; Ivory Coast; Madagascar	Kenya; Cameroon	Uganda; Zambia; Botswana; Swaziland	—N/a
2007	South Africa	Namibia	—N/a	Morocco	—N/a	—N/a	Tunisia; Kenya; Ivory Coast; Uganda	Cameroon; Nigeria; Botswana; Swaziland; Zambia; Senegal; Zimbabwe; Madagascar	—N/a
2011	South Africa	Namibia	—N/a	Tunisia	—N/a	—N/a	Ivory Coast; Uganda	Senegal; Zimbabwe; Morocco; Zambia; Kenya; Cameroon; Madagascar; Botswana	Nigeria; Eswatini
2015	South Africa	Namibia	—N/a	Zimbabwe	Kenya; Madagascar	—N/a	Botswana; Senegal; Tunisia; Uganda	Ivory Coast; Mauritius; Zambia; Nigeria; Morocco	—N/a
2019	South Africa	Namibia	—N/a	Kenya	Uganda; Tunisia; Zimbabwe; Morocco	—N/a	Senegal; Botswana; Madagascar; Ivory Coast	Zambia; Nigeria; Mauritius	—N/a
2023	South Africa	Namibia	—N/a	Kenya	Burkina Faso; Ivory Coast; Uganda; Senegal; Zimbabwe; Algeria	—N/a	Madagascar; Zambia; Ghana	Cameroon; Burundi	—N/a
2027	South Africa	Zimbabwe	—N/a	Namibia	Algeria; Kenya; Senegal; Morocco; Uganda; Ivory Coast	—N/a	Tunisia; Zambia; Ghana; Nigeria; Madagascar; Botswana; Cameroon	Burkina Faso	—N/a
