= Eswatini Rugby Union =

Sports governing body in Eswatini

- Sport: Rugby union
- Founded: 1995
- World Rugby affiliation: 1998
- Rugby Africa affiliation: 1995
- Website: www.swazilandrugby.com

The Eswatini Rugby Union is the governing body for rugby union in Eswatini. It was founded in 1995 and organises and oversees local and international rugby involving Eswatini. Eswatini Rugby Union (then Swaziland Rugby Union) became affiliated to World Rugby in 1998.
