= Zambia Rugby Football Union =

Governing sporting body for rugby union in Zambia

The Zambia Rugby Union is the governing body for rugby union in Zambia. They also govern rugby sevens in Zambia. It is a member of the Confederation of African Rugby (CAR) and a member of the International Rugby Board. It administers the Zambia national rugby union team. Zambia Sevens has qualified for 2 Commonwealth games - the 2018 event in the Gold coast and the 2022 event in Birmingham.

The 7s side finished 4th at the 2022 Africa 7s, losing out by a try to Kenya in the Bronze final.
