= Ghana Rugby Association =

Governing body for rugby union in Ghana

Ghana Rugby Football Union
- Sport: Rugby union
- Founded: 2003; 23 years ago
- World Rugby affiliation: 2004
- Rugby Africa affiliation: 2003
- President: Erica Amoako
- Website: ghanarugby.org

The Ghana Rugby Association, operating as the Ghana Rugby Football Union, is the governing body for rugby union in Ghana. It is a member of Rugby Africa and a full member of World Rugby since 2017.

== Herbert Mensah presidency - since 5 June 2014 ==
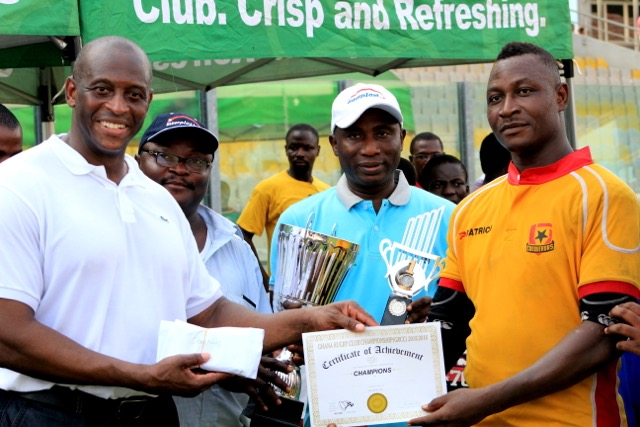
Mr. Herbert Mensah presenting a certificate of achievement and the winner's trophy of the 2016 Ghana Rugby Club Championship to the winning captain of Conquerors SC.

Prior to his appointment as President of Ghana Rugby, Mensah was appointed to the executive of the Greater Accra Rugby Association (GARA) in May 2014. At the occasion, he stressed the importance to build infrastructure to motivate the youth and to grow the game of rugby in Ghana. On assuming office, his first priority was to order an assessment of the state of rugby in Ghana by his board members. He travelled to Dublin to meet with officials of World Rugby to seek guidance on the development of Rugby in Ghana. The meeting was followed up with a meeting, also in Dublin, with the Rugby Africa Development Manager.

He also met with various stakeholders including regional associations, clubs, players and the business community.

On Friday, 29 August 2014, Mensah convened a Ghana Rugby Stakeholder Forum in Accra, where the Ghana Rugby Blueprint was presented.

He also arranged training sessions for both coaches and referees to improve the quality of the sport in Ghana. The coaches' training conducted by Mr David Dobela of South Africa was described as a historical event for Ghana Rugby as it was the first time in 11 years that coaches were trained on both Level 1 and Level 2 for rugby union and Sevens coaching.

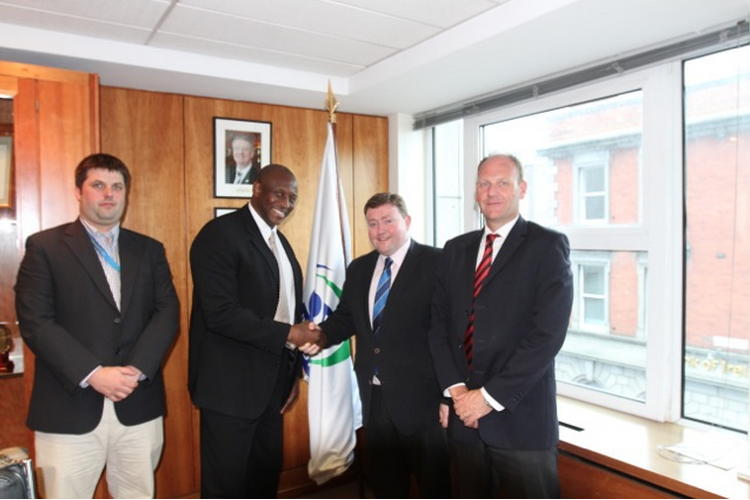
Herbert Mensah, President of Ghana Rugby, meeting with David Carrigy and Morgan Buckley of World Rugby in Dublin, Ireland in July 2014.

Based on his consultations with both World Rugby and Rugby Africa, Mensah realised that a stumbling block in the way of Ghana Rugby to become a full member of World Rugby was the successful completion of a successfully run local league by at least ten clubs. He immediately mobilised his resources, and planned and completed the first professionally run Ghana Rugby Club Championship (GRCC).

One of Mensah's major challenges as president of Ghana Rugby remains funding the sport and he has initiated various activities including a raffle ticket drive. He also managed to get corporates such as Accra Brewery, Interplast Ghana, Vodafone Ghana and Zen Petroleum involved in supporting Ghana Rugby. In collaboration with the Vodafone Ghana management team he staged a management motivational event using the values and principles of rugby to help Vodafone prepare its management for year ahead.

He has challenged the Government of Ghana on more than one occasion about support promised to minority sports such as rugby that has never been delivered. He remains a vocal critic of other government failures well beyond the realm of sport.

After the 2015–16 Ghana Rugby Club Championship, Mensah, in the absence of a National Technical Director, appointed a four-man technical squad under his guidance to prepare the Ghana national men's sevens team for its Africa Rugby international commitment. The technical team consisting of Messrs. Simba Mangena (Head Coach of Conquerors SC), Clement Dennis (Player / Coach of Griffons RFC), Amuzuloh Salim (Head Coach of Cosmos Buffaloes RFC) and Dan Hoppe (Idas Sports RFC) put the squad of 25 players through a rigorous training programme that ended in April 2016. This was followed by Phase II of the preparation that started early May when a reduced squad of 16 players started camping in Accra.

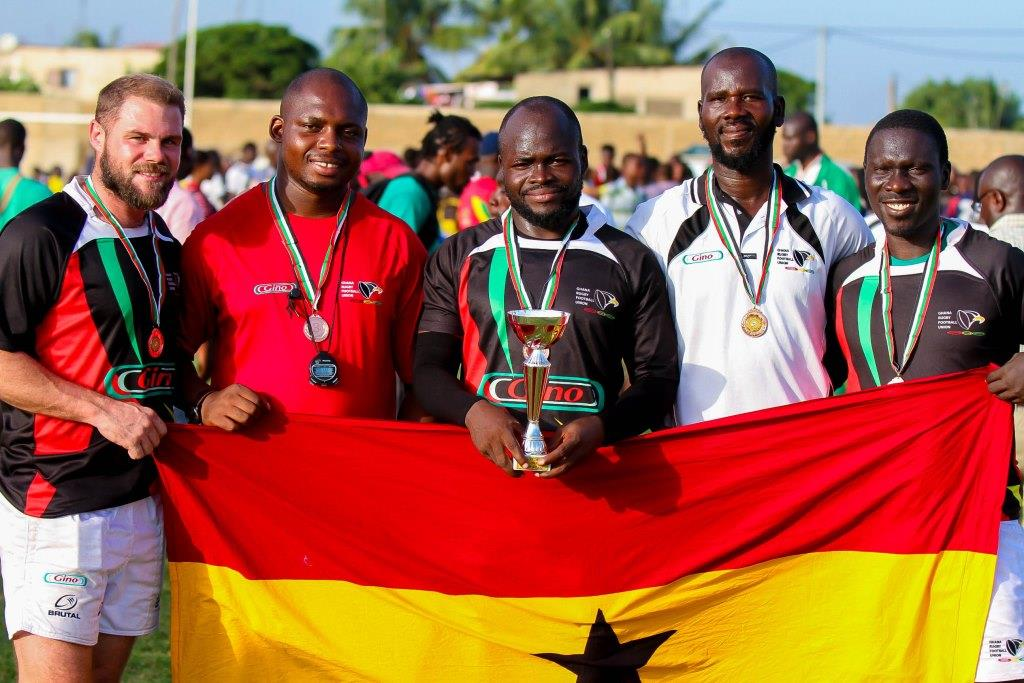
The Ghana national men's sevens Rugby team managed to lift the bronze cup in the 2016 Africa Rugby "Africa Cup West" tournament in Lome, Togo on 28 May 2016.

The final squad of 12 players who competed in the Africa Rugby "Africa Cup West" men's sevens tournament in Lome, Togo on 28 May 2016 consisted of: Dan Hoppe (Idas Sports RFC), Clement Dennis (Griffons RFC), Sani Alhassan (Captain)(Cosmos Buffaloes RFC), Alex Dorpenyo (Conquerors SC), Seidu Razak (Conquerors SC), Solomon Akumba (Cosmos Buffaloes RFC), Michael Acquaye (Conquerors SC), Calestus Bosoka (Conquerors SC), Emmanuel Kalos (Conquerors SC), Joseph Mensah (Griffons RFC), Erick Acquah (Griffons RFC) and Nasiru Aminu (Conquerors SC).

The Ghana Eagles, as the Ghana national Rugby team is known, managed to lift the Bronze or Third Place cup after it was ranked as number one based on the Pool results.

=== Full membership of World Rugby ===
On 10 May 2017 the World Rugby Council approved the application by the Ghana Rugby Football Union as a full member union, bringing the total number to 104 full members and 17 associates.

World Rugby Chairman Bill Beaumont said: "We are delighted to be welcoming Ghana as a full member of World Rugby. These are very exciting times for our sport with unprecedented growth and interest around the world. With today's announcement, we look forward to a strong, well-organised game in Ghana and we are glad that the union is now ready to join the global rugby family as a full member and continue its work growing the game in Africa.”

=== Other achievements in 2017 ===
In addition to its promotion to Full Membership of World Rugby, Ghana Rugby recorded several other achievements in 2017.

==== Winner of Rugby Africa Regional Challenge - West 1 ====
Ghana Rugby was awarded the hosting rights for the 2017 Rugby Africa Regional Challenge - West 1 between Benin, Ghana and Togo in Accra, Ghana.

Ghana Rugby managed to win the tournament by beating Benin 46 - 5 and Togo 10 - 0 to lift the Regional Challenge Trophy.

==== Ranking on Rugby Africa Men's Sevens Log ====
Ghana Rugby competed for the first time in the Rugby Africa Men's Sevens Tournament in Kampala-Uganda by beating Mauritius 26 to 0 to be placed 9th in the Africa Men's Sevens Tournament.

The competition was played between ten of Africa's best nations between 6 and 7 October 2017 in Kampala-Uganda.

==== Promotion to Rugby Africa 2018 Bronze Cup ====
Ghana Rugby ended 2017 on a high note when was promoted from the Rugby Africa Regional Challenge to the 2018 Rugby Africa Bronze Cup.

The announcement that was issued by Rugby Afrique said that the Rugby Africa Bronze Cup will take place from the 9th to 12 May in Accra, Ghana between Ghana, Lesotho, Mauritius and Rwanda.

=== Re-election as president and board chairman of Ghana Rugby ===
On 25 September 2017 Ghana Rugby elected a new board and officers based on a newly adopted Constitution. Mensah was elected as president and board member by the GRFU constitutional electorate and he was subsequently appointed as board chairman by the newly elected board.

World Rugby Chairman Bill Beaumont and the CEO of World Rugby, Brett Gosper, congratulated Mensah and the GRFU Board in a joint statement and said that they "look forward to continuing to work with you and the Board going forward".

In February 2020 he was re-elected President by the Ghana Rugby Football Union. He run unchallenged at a Special General Meeting and was also reappointed board chairman for a term spanning four years.

== Ghana Rugby Football Union ==
The Ghana Rugby football Union (GRFU) is the governing body for Rugby Union in Ghana. It was established in 2003 and is now a full member of World Rugby. It is also a full member of World Rugby's Africa Region, Rugby Africa.

=== History ===
The Ghana Rugby Football Union was established in 2003 by Guy Chaley who came from Cameroon to create the Ghana national rugby union team. The team won their first match against the Mauritania national rugby union team by 29–8. Since then the team has entered a number of successful tournaments created by Rugby Africa, previously known as CAR. As well as the national team, the union also boasts a number of age grade national teams such as the national Under 20 team, and it also has a new and successful women's team.

The body's headquarters are in Accra. The union's president is Herbert Mensah a former player, sports administrator and business man.

At an Election Congress of Ghana Rugby on 5 June 2014 the first change in the administration took place since its inception in 2003 when Herbert Mensah was elected as the second president of the GRFU.

=== National teams ===
Ghana boasts a number of national teams such as the senior national 15s, Senior national 7s, under 18, 15 and 12 teams.

=== Constitution ===
The GRFU adopted a new Constitution at a Special Annual General Meeting (AGM) held on 17 June 2017 in Accra. The election of new board members in accordance with the new Constitution is scheduled for September 2017.

=== Members ===
According to the GRFU Constitution the Union has two Members, namely the Greater Accra Rugby Association (GARA) and the CentWest Rugby Association (CentWest).

=== Greater Accra Rugby Association (GARA) ===
The Greater Accra Rugby Association (GARA) is a member of Ghana Rugby with the following clubs affiliated to GARA:

- Accra Rugby Club
- Conquerors Sporting Club
- Cosmos Buffaloes R F C
- Dansoman Hurricanes R F C
- Lions R F C
- Titans Sporting Club

=== CentWest Rugby Association (CentWest) ===
The CentWest Rugby Association (CentWest) is a member of Ghana Rugby with the following clubs affiliated to CentWest:

- Dennis Foundation Sporting Club
- Griffons R F C
- Stallions R F C
- U C C Spartans R F C
- Western Cheetahs R F C

== Rugby Africa tournaments ==
Ghana Rugby has competed in Rugby Africa tournaments since 2003.

Over the period 2003 to 2017 Ghana Rugby played 34 international matches of which it won 14, lost 17 and drew 3. The total point scored by Ghana Rugby was 438 with 425 scored against it.

=== 2017 Men's 15s ===
- 30 April 2017 Ghana 46 - 5 Benin
- 7 May 2017 Ghana 10 - 0 Togo

Ghana wins the Rugby Afrique 2017 Regional Challenge - Group West 1

=== 2016 Men's 7s ===
- 27 May 2016 Mali 0 - 15 Ghana
- 27 May 2016 Ghana 19 - 0 Benin
- 27 May 2016 Ghana 19 - 22 Togo Semifinal
- 27 May 2016 Niger 5 - 14 Ghana

Ghana wins 3rd Place Playoff

=== 2015 Men's 15s and 7s ===
Men's 15s

- 24 May 2015 Niger 28 - 10 Ghana
- 27 May 2015 Ghana 7 - 24 Mali
- 30 May 2015 Burkina Faso 12 - 0 Ghana

Men's 7s

- 6 June 2015 Togo 24 - 12 Ghana
- 6 June 2015 Ivory Coast 15 - 10 Ghana
- 6 June 2015 Ghana 27 - 7 Mali Ghana ends 5th

=== 2014 Men's 7s ===
- 17 May 2014 Mali 12 - 12 Ghana
- 17 May 2014 Niger 0 - 10 Ghana
- 17 May 2014 Ghana 33 - 0 Benin
- 17 May 2014 Togo 0 - 40 Ghana
- 18 May 2014 Burkina Faso 25 - 5 Ghana

=== 2011 Men's 15s ===
- 24 July 2011 Benin 7 - 16 Ghana
- 27 July 2011 Mali 28 - 3 Ghana
- 30 July 2011 Burkina Faso 15 - 3 Ghana

=== 2010 Men's 15s ===
- 24 July 2010 Mali 17 - 8 Ghana

=== 2009 Men's 15s ===
- 13 July 2009 Ghana 5 - 5 Nigeria
- 15 July 2009 Ghana 17 - 7 Burkina Faso
- 18 July 2009 Niger 5 - 3 Ghana

=== 2008 Men's 15s ===
- 23 June 2008 Ghana 17 - 8 Chad
- 27 June 2008 Ghana 8 - 9 Burkina Faso
- 29 June 2008 Ghana 27 - 6 Togo

=== 2004 Men's 15s ===
- 29 June 2004 Ghana 0 - 20 Nigeria
- 1 July 2004 Togo 15 - 5 Ghana
- 3 July 2004 Ghana 3 - 3 Benin

=== 2003 Men's 15s ===
- 10 Oct 2003 Ghana 29 - 8 Mauritania
- 10 Oct 2003 Ghana 3 - 40 Cameroon
- 10 Oct 2003 Ghana 14 - 9 Togo
- 10 Oct 2003 Ghana 3 - 29 Nigeria
