= Burundi Rugby Federation =

- Sport: Rugby union
- Founded: 2001; 25 years ago
- World Rugby affiliation: 2021
- Rugby Africa affiliation: 2003

The Burundi Rugby Federation (French: Fédération Burundaise de Rugby) is the governing body for rugby union in Burundi. It was founded in 2001, became a member union of Rugby Africa in 2003, and became a full member of World Rugby in 2021.
