= Norwegian Rugby Union =

Sports governing body in Norway

Norges Rugbyforbund
- Sport: Rugby union
- Founded: 1982; 44 years ago
- World Rugby affiliation: 1993
- Rugby Europe affiliation: 1988
- Women's coach: (England) Alexander Wilson
- Website: www.rugby.no

The Norwegian Rugby Union (Norwegian: Norges Rugbyforbund) is the governing body for rugby union in Norway. It was founded in 1982 and became affiliated to the International Rugby Board in 1993.

== See also ==
- Norway national rugby union team
- Rugby union in Norway
