= Rwanda Rugby Federation =

Governing body for rugby union in Rwanda

The Rwanda Rugby Federation (French: Fédération Rwandaise de Rugby) is the governing body for rugby union in Rwanda. It is a member of the Confederation of African Rugby (CAR), now known as Rugby Africa and it has been a full member of World Rugby since December 2015. As of 2025, Tharcisse Kamanda is the president of the Rwanda Rugby Federation.
