= Botswana Rugby Union =

Governing body for rugby union in Botswana

- Sport: Rugby union
- Founded: 1992
- World Rugby affiliation: 1994
- Rugby Africa affiliation: 2000

The Botswana Rugby Union is the governing body for rugby union in Botswana. It is a member of Rugby Africa and World Rugby.
