= Uganda Rugby Union =

Governing body for rugby union in Uganda

- Sport: Rugby union
- Founded: 1955 (as Uganda Rugby Football Union)
- Headquarters: Plot 2–10 Hesketh Bell Road, Lugogo Sports Complex, Kampala, Uganda
- President: Godwin Kayangwe
- Website: www.ugandarugby.com

The Uganda Rugby Union is the governing body for rugby union in Uganda. It was established in 1959 and is responsible for organising local competitions and the Rugby Cranes national representative team. The URU is a member of both World Rugby and Rugby Africa.

== History ==
Rugby Africa and academic research trace URU’s origins to 1955, when the Uganda Rugby Football Union (URFU) formed under the regional rugby structures in East Africa. World Rugby affiliation followed in July 1997.

== Hosting and major events ==
Uganda hosted the Rugby Africa Cup in 2024. Rugby Africa reported all 12 matches held at Mandela National Stadium and Wankulukuku Stadium in Uganda from 20 to 28 July 2024, with Uganda finishing 5th in the final rankings.

Rugby Africa reported Uganda as host again for the 2025 Rugby Africa Cup, scheduled from 8 to 19 July 2025 at Mandela National Stadium, with participating teams listed as Uganda, Zimbabwe, Algeria, Namibia, Kenya, Senegal, Côte d’Ivoire, and Morocco. Rugby World Cup’s qualifying page later listed Zimbabwe as the 2025 champions and Namibia as runners-up, with Uganda among the nations involved in the competition.

== See also ==
- Rugby union in Uganda
- Uganda national rugby union team
- Uganda women's national rugby union team
- Rugby Africa Cup
- Rugby union in Africa
