= Togolese Rugby Federation =

Governing body for rugby union in Togo

Togolese Rugby Federation (French: Fédération Togolaise de Rugby) is the governing body for rugby union in Togo. It is a member of the Confederation of African Rugby (CAR) and the International Rugby Board.
