= Mauritius Rugby Union =

The Mauritius Rugby Union is the governing body for rugby union in Mauritius. It is a member of the Confederation of African Rugby (CAR) and a member of the International Rugby Board. It was founded in 2009.
