= Qatar Rugby Federation =

Governing body for rugby union in Qatar

- Sport: Rugby union
- Founded: 2006
- World Rugby affiliation: 2020 (associate)
- Asia affiliation: 2016
- Website: www.qatarrugby.qa

The Qatar Rugby Federation (Arabic: الاتحاد القطري للرجبي) is the governing body for rugby union in Qatar. It was founded in 2006 and sent teams to the Arabian 7s Challenge Cup in that year. However, it was largely dormant until the Arabian Gulf Rugby Football Union (AGRFU) was dissolved at the end of 2010. The AGRFU had organised local and regional rugby competitions before then across most countries in the Arabian Peninsula, including Qatar, but was split up to allow national federations to take charge in each country.

The Qatar Rugby Federation was fully affiliated to Asia Rugby in 2016, and became an associate member of World Rugby in 2020.

== Teams ==
Men's

- Qatar national rugby union team
- Qatar national rugby sevens team

Women's

- Qatar women's national rugby sevens team

== See also ==
- Rugby union in the Arabian Peninsula
