= Ivorian Rugby Federation =

Sport governing body in Ivory Coast

Fédération Ivoirienne de Rugby
- Sport: Rugby union
- Founded: 1961
- World Rugby affiliation: 1988
- CAR affiliation: 1986
- President: Marcellin Zahui

Fédération Ivoirienne de Rugby is the governing body for rugby union in the Ivory Coast. It was founded in 1961 and became affiliated to the International Rugby Board in 1988.
