= Tunisian Rugby Federation =

National governing body for rugby union

Fédération tunisienne de rugby à XV; الجامعة التونسية للرقبي
- Sport: Rugby union
- Founded: 1970; 56 years ago
- World Rugby affiliation: 1988
- Rugby Africa affiliation: 1988
- Headquarters: Tunis
- President: (Tunisia) Aref Belkhiria
- Website: ftr.tn

The Tunisian Rugby Federation (Arabic: الجامعة التونسية للرقبي, French: Fédération tunisienne de rugby) is the governing body for rugby union in Tunisia. It was founded in 1970 and became affiliated to the International Rugby Board in 1988.

== See also ==
- Tunisia national rugby union team
- Tunisia national rugby sevens team
- Rugby union in Tunisia
