= Thai Rugby Union =

Governing body of rugby union in Thailand

สมาคมกีฬารักบี้ฟุตบอลแห่งประเทศไทย ในพระบรมราชูปถัมภ์
- Sport: Rugby union
- Founded: 1937; 88 years ago
- World Rugby affiliation: 1989
- President: General Attapoj Klongtruadroke
- Website: www.thailandrugbyunion.com

The Thailand Rugby Union (TRU) is the governing body of rugby union in Thailand, recognised by the International Rugby Board. It has its headquarters in Bangkok, and was founded in 1937, affiliating to the International Rugby Board in 1989.

== See also ==
- Thailand national rugby union team
