= Egyptian Rugby Football Union =

Rugby union governing body of Egypt

- Sport: Rugby union
- Founded: 2008; 17 years ago
- World Rugby affiliation: 2022
- Rugby Africa affiliation: 2019
- Website: egyptrugby.com

The Egyptian Rugby Football Union is the governing body for rugby union in Egypt and was founded in 2008. The Egyptian Rugby Football Union became a full member of Rugby Africa in 2019 and an associate member of World Rugby in 2022.

The Egyptian Rugby Football Union has mainly focused on rugby sevens, they hosted the men’s and women’s regional competitions in Alexandria in 2021.

On 14 November 2024, Egypt was granted World Rugby Full Member status by the World Rugby Council.
