= Royal Moroccan Rugby Federation =

Fédération Royale Marocaine de Rugby
- Sport: Rugby union
- Founded: 1956
- World Rugby affiliation: 1988
- FIRA affiliation: 1956
- President: Hicham Oubajja
- Men's coach: Francis Was

The Royal Moroccan Rugby Federation (French: Fédération Royale Marocaine de Rugby) is the governing body for rugby union in Morocco. It is affiliated with the International Rugby Board and is responsible for the Moroccan national team and the Moroccan Rugby Championship.

== History ==
Morocco has never qualified for the Rugby World Cup; their best result is 16-all draw with Namibia in 1994 in the last stages of 1995 World Cup qualifying.

Morocco lost the qualifying process for the 2007 Rugby World Cup. They were the winner of group ("B") with Uganda and Ivory Coast, but lost both the home and away games against the winner of group A Namibia. They lost twice with Portugal in January 2007, for a berth in the Rugby World Cup as Repechage 1.
