= World Rugby =

Rugby union governing body

- Formation: 1886; 140 years ago (as the International Rugby Football Board)
- Type: International sports federation
- Headquarters: Dublin, Ireland
- Coordinates: 53°20′13″N 6°15′08″W
- Region served: Worldwide
- Members: 114 member unions 17 associated unions
- Official languages: English; French; Italian; Spanish
- Chairman: Brett Robinson
- Vice-Chairman: Jonathan Webb
- CEO: Alan Gilpin
- Affiliations: International Olympic Committee
- Website: www.world.rugby
- Formerly called: International Rugby Football Board (1886-1998); International Rugby Board (1998-2014)

World Rugby is the governing body for the sport of rugby union. World Rugby organises the Rugby World Cup every four years, the sport's most recognised and most profitable competition. It also organises a number of other international competitions, such as the Nations Cup, the WXV Global Series, the Junior World Championship, the Pacific Nations Cup and the SVNS.

World Rugby's headquarters are in Dublin, Ireland. Its membership now comprises 133 national unions. Each member country must also be a member of one of the six regional unions into which the world is divided: Africa, North America, Asia, Europe, South America, and Oceania.

World Rugby was founded as the International Rugby Football Board (IRFB) in 1886 by Scotland, Wales and Ireland, with England joining in 1890. Australia, New Zealand and South Africa became full members in 1949. France became a member in 1978 and a further 80 members joined from 1987 to 1999. The body was renamed the International Rugby Board (IRB) in 1998, and took up its current name of World Rugby in 2014. In 2009, the International Olympic Committee (IOC) voted to include rugby sevens in the 2016 Summer Olympics. World Rugby gained membership of the Association of Summer Olympic International Federations (ASOIF) in 2010.

== History ==
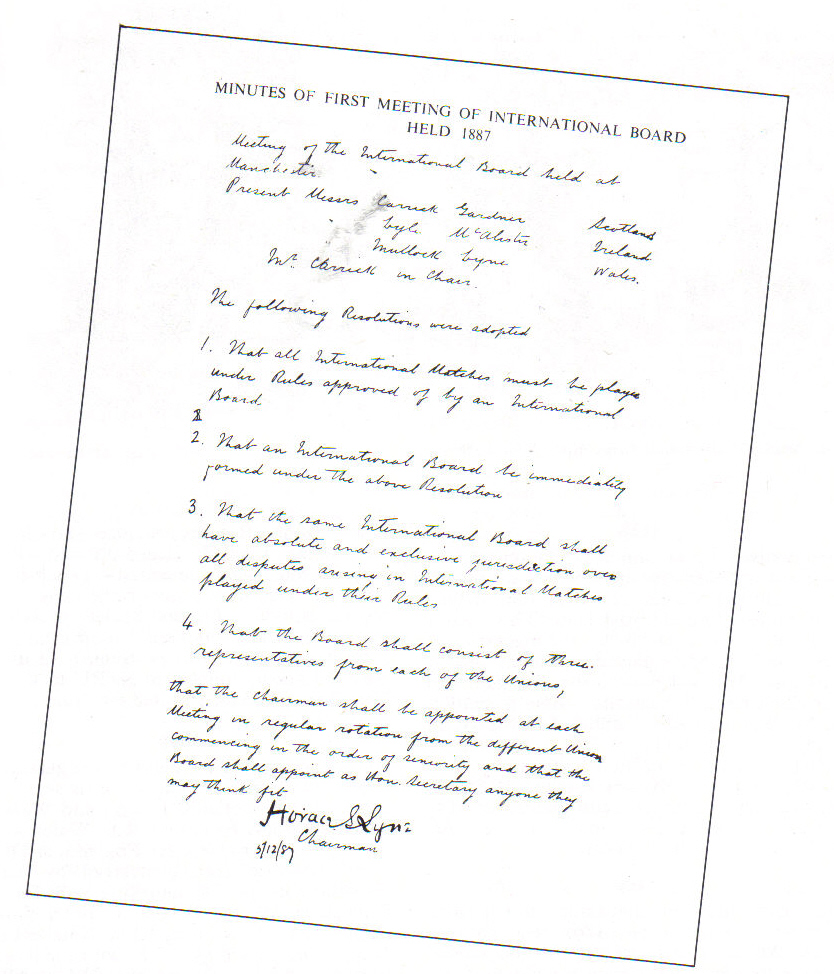
The minutes of the first formal meeting of the IRFB, from a meeting attended by Lyle and McAlistair of Ireland, Carrick and Gardner of Scotland, Mullock and Lyne of Wales

Until 1885, the laws of rugby football were made by England as the founder nation. However, following a disputed try in an international between Scotland and England in 1884, letters were exchanged in which England claimed that they made the laws, and the try should stand. Scotland refused to play England in the 1885 Home Nations Championship. Following the dispute, the home unions of Scotland, Ireland and Wales decided to form an international union whose membership would agree on the standard rules of rugby football. The three nations met in Dublin in 1886, though no formal regulations were agreed upon.

On 5 December 1887, committee members of the Irish Rugby Football Union, Scottish Rugby Union (named the Scottish Football Union at the time) and Welsh Rugby Union met in Manchester and wrote up the first four principles of the International Rugby Football Board. England refused to take part in the founding of the IRFB, stating that they should have greater representation, as they had more clubs. The England Union also refused to accept the IRFB as the recognised lawmaker of the game. This led to the IRFB taking the stance of member countries not playing England until they joined, and no games were played against England in 1888 and 1889. In 1890 England joined the IRFB, gaining six seats while the other unions had two each. The same year, the IRFB wrote the first international laws of rugby union.

In 1893, the IRFB was faced with the divide between amateurism and professionalism, which was nicknamed the "Great Schism". Following the introduction of working-class men to the game in Northern England, clubs began paying "broken time" payments to players, due to the loss of earnings from playing on a Saturday. Cumberland County Union also complained of another club using monetary incentives to lure players, leading to the IRFB conducting an enquiry. The IRFB was warned by all the chief clubs in Lancashire and Yorkshire that any punishment would lead to the clubs seceding from the union. The debate over broken time payments ultimately caused the 22 leading clubs in Yorkshire and Lancashire to form the Northern Rugby Football Union. The competing unions' laws of the game diverged almost immediately; the northern body's code eventually became known as rugby league football.

England's seats on the IRFB were reduced from six to four in 1911. The Australian Rugby Union, New Zealand Rugby Football Union and South African Rugby Board joined the board with one seat each in 1948, with England's seats being reduced to two, the same as the other home nations. The three Southern Hemisphere unions were given a second seat each in 1958. The French Rugby Federation was admitted in 1978, the Argentine Rugby Union, Italian Rugby Federation and USA Rugby Football Union in 1987, and the Canadian Rugby Union, and Japan Rugby Football Union were admitted in 1991. In 2016, the Georgia Rugby Union, Romanian Rugby Federation, and the USA were added to the voting Council with one vote each. Additionally, current Council members Argentina, Canada and Italy were granted a second representative and vote. The six regional associations represented on the council also received an additional vote.

After the 2022 Russian invasion of Ukraine, World Rugby suspended Russia from international and European continental rugby union competition. In addition, the Rugby Union of Russia was suspended from World Rugby.

=== Rugby World Cup ===
In the 1960s Australians Harold Tolhurst and Jock Kellaher suggested a World Rugby Championship be held in Australia but the IRFB refused. In 1983 and 1984 respectively, the Australian and New Zealand Rugby Football Unions each proposed hosting such a tournament. The following year the board committed to conduct a feasibility study. A year later another meeting took place in Paris, and the Union subsequently voted on the idea. The South African Rugby Board's vote that proved crucial in setting up a tied vote, as they voted in favour, even though they knew they would be excluded due to the sporting boycott because of their apartheid policies. English and Welsh votes then changed, and the vote was won 10 to 6.

== Member unions ==
Member and Associated Unions Member Union Associated Union

As of October 2026, World Rugby has 114 member unions and 17 associate member unions.

Membership of World Rugby is a four-step process:

1. A Union must apply to become an associate member of its Regional Union
2. After all membership criteria are met, including one year as an associate member, the Union is admitted to the Regional Union as a full member
3. After completion of stages 1 and 2, and two years as a full member of a Regional Union, the Union may then apply to become an Associate member of World Rugby. As an associate member, the union can participate in World Rugby funded tournaments but not the Rugby World Cup
4. Following two years of associate membership of World Rugby, the union may then apply to become a Full Member

Regional Unions

Six regional associations, which represent each continent, are affiliated with World Rugby and help to develop the fifteen-a-side game as well as Rugby sevens across the world. Not all members of the regional associations are members of World Rugby. Below is a list of member and associate unions and their regional associations with the year that they joined World Rugby. Associate unions are in italics.

=== Africa ===
There are 21 World Rugby members and 7 World Rugby associates:

- Algeria (2021)
- Benin (2025*)
- Botswana (1994)
- Burkina Faso (2020)
- Burundi (2021)
- Cameroon (1999)
- DR Congo (2022*)
- Egypt (2022*)
- Eswatini (1998)
- Ghana (2017) (Note: Ghana joined World Rugby as an associate member in 2004, and became a full member in 2017.)
- (Ivory Coast) Ivory Coast (1988)
- Kenya (1990)
- Lesotho (2022*)
- Madagascar (1998)
- Mali (2004*)
- Mauritius (2009)
- Morocco (1998)
- Namibia (1990)
- Nigeria (2001) (Note: Nigeria was suspended in May 2021 due to the illegal dissolution of the elected board of the Nigeria Rugby Football Federation and the replacement of a three man committee by the Nigerian Government.)
- Rwanda (2015)
- Senegal (1999)
- South Africa (1949)
- Tanzania (2004*)
- Togo (2004*)
- Tunisia (1988)
- Uganda (1997)
- Zambia (1995)
- Zimbabwe (1987)

Notes:

* Denotes associate membership date.

=== Asia ===
There are 22 World Rugby members, and 6 World Rugby associates: (Note: The Arabian Gulf Rugby Football Union was disbanded in 2010.)

- Brunei (2013*)
- China (1997)
- (Chinese Taipei) Chinese Taipei (1998)
- Guam (1998)
- (Hong Kong) Hong Kong (1988)
- India (1999)
- Indonesia (2013)
- Iran (2010)
- Iraq (2026)
- Japan (1987)
- Jordan (2020*)
- Kazakhstan (1997)
- (South Korea) Korea (1988)
- Kyrgyzstan (2004*)
- Laos (2004)
- Lebanon (2018*)
- Malaysia (1988)
- Mongolia (2021)
- Nepal (2023)
- Pakistan (2008)
- Philippines (2008)
- Qatar (2023)
- Singapore (1989)
- (Sri Lanka) Sri Lanka (1988)
- Syria (2022*)
- Thailand (1989)
- United Arab Emirates (2012) (Note: UAE became the 100th full member of the IRB in November 2012.)
- Uzbekistan (2014)

Notes:

* Denotes associate membership date.

=== Europe ===
There are 37 World Rugby members, and 4 World Rugby associates. The three founding unions of the IRFB which became World Rugby are all European: Ireland, Scotland and Wales:

- Andorra (1991)
- Austria (1992)
- Azerbaijan (2004*)
- Belgium (1988)
- Bosnia and Herzegovina (1996)
- Bulgaria (1992)
- Croatia (1992)
- Cyprus (2014*)
- (Czech Republic) Czech Republic (1988)
- Denmark (1988)
- England (1890)
- Finland (2001)
- France (1978)
- (Georgia (country)) Georgia (1992)
- Germany (1988)
- Hungary (1991)
- Ireland (1886)
- Israel (1988)
- Italy (1987)
- Latvia (1991)
- Lithuania (1992)
- Luxembourg (1991)
- Malta (2000)
- Moldova (1994)
- Monaco (1996)
- Montenegro (2024*)
- Slovenia (1996)
- Netherlands (1988)
- Norway (1993)
- Poland (1988)
- Portugal (1988)
- Romania (1987)
- Scotland (1886)
- Serbia (1988)
- Slovakia (2016*) (Note: Slovakia became an associate in 2016, although the Handbook incorrectly recorded the country's name as Slovenia (a member since 1996).)
- Slovenia (1996)
- Spain (1988)
- Sweden (1988)
- Switzerland (1988)
- Turkey (2023) (Note: Turkey joined World Rugby as an associate member in 2020, and became a full member in 2023.)
- Ukraine (1992)
- Wales (1886)

Suspended unions:

- Greece (Note: The Greek federation has been inactive since 2014 after losing official government recognition.)
- Russia (Note: Russia, previously a member since 1990, was suspended in 2022 due to the Russian invasion of Ukraine.)

Notes:

* Denotes associate membership date.

=== North America ===
There are 12 World Rugby members, and 1 World Rugby associate:

- (The Bahamas) Bahamas (1994)
- Barbados (1995)
- Bermuda (1992)
- (British Virgin Islands) British Virgin Islands (2001*)
- Canada (1987)
- (Cayman Islands) Cayman Islands (1997)
- Guyana (1995)
- Jamaica (1996)
- Mexico (2006)
- (Saint Lucia) St. Lucia (2022)
- (Saint Vincent and the Grenadines) St. Vincent & the Grenadines (2001)
- (Trinidad and Tobago) Trinidad and Tobago (1992)
- United States (1987)

Notes:

* Denotes associate membership date.

=== Oceania ===
There are 11 World Rugby members:

- (American Samoa) American Samoa (2012)
- Australia (1949)
- Cook Islands (1995)
- Fiji (1987)
- New Zealand (1949)
- Niue (1999)
- (Papua New Guinea) Papua New Guinea (1993)
- Samoa (1988)
- (Solomon Islands) Solomon Islands (1999)
- Tonga (1987)
- Vanuatu (1999)

=== South America ===
There are 9 World Rugby members, and 2 World Rugby associates:

- Argentina (1987)
- Brazil (1995)
- Chile (1991)
- Colombia (1999)
- (Costa Rica) Costa Rica (2017)
- Guatemala (2016*)
- Panama (2020*)
- Paraguay (1989)
- Peru (1999)
- Uruguay (1989)
- Venezuela (1998)

Notes:

* Denotes associate membership date.

== Participation figures ==
World Rugby's largest members, ranked by number of participants in 2019, are:

1. England (2,112,603)
2. United States (1,478,190)
3. South Africa (691.559)
4. France (533,131)
5. Australia (477,031)
6. Japan (295,939)
7. Colombia (265,718)
8. Fiji (225,180)
9. Canada (217,042)
10. China (215,056)
11. Ireland (209,906)
12. Scotland (182,131)
13. Brazil (174,290)
14. Argentina (161,265)
15. New Zealand (156,074)
16. Kenya (122,840)
17. Spain (114,315)
18. Russia (108,566)
19. Wales (107,959)
20. (Sri Lanka) Sri Lanka (96,248)
21. Italy (96,088)

== Governance ==
=== Council ===
The World Rugby Council meets twice a year and manages and controls the affairs of World Rugby. The Council formulates and oversees the implementation of World Rugby's strategic plan and application of policy decisions, and selects the host nation(s) for the Rugby World Cup. The Council considers recommendations of the General Assembly. The Council may admit or expel member nations. The council is also the supreme legislative authority of World Rugby. Most Council decisions require approval of simple majority, but to amend the World Rugby's by-laws, regulations, or the Laws of the Game requires approval of three quarters of the council.

Prior to 2016, the council had 28 voting members from 12 national unions. In November 2015, World Rugby announced that they would add more unions to the voting council and give the six regional associations two votes each on the council.

As of October 2023, the council had 52 members including the non-voting chairman, so there were 51 voting members from 17 national unions and 6 regional associations, allocated as follows:

- (33) Eleven unions with three votes each: Argentina, Australia, England, France, Ireland, Italy, Japan, New Zealand, Scotland, South Africa, and Wales.
- (6) Six (Note: Fiji are entitled to one World Rugby council member. However, as of October 2023, they have been suspended from the council.) unions with one vote each: Canada, Georgia, Romania, Samoa, the United States, and Uruguay.
- (12) The six regional associations representing Africa, Asia, Europe, North America, Oceania, and South America with two votes each.

In total, Europe has 22 votes; Oceania 9 votes; South America 6 votes; Africa 5 votes; Asia 5 votes; and North America 4 votes.

A Chairman and Vice Chairman are elected from among the council members.

=== Executive committee ===
The executive committee, in accordance with bye-laws 9.14–9.16, ensures the effective management and operation of the World Rugby. The Committee formulates and monitors the implementation of the World Rugby's strategic plan, business plan, operational plan and budget. In 2016, as part of the reforms to the World Rugby Council, the executive committee was increased to 12 members. The Chairman, Vice-chairman, nine elected officials, including two independent members, and the Chief Executive sit on the World Rugby Executive Committee.

=== General Assembly ===
A General Assembly of the full membership is convened every two years. The General Assembly may make recommendations to the council, and may consider business that the council has referred to it, but the General Assembly has no legislative powers.

=== Leadership ===
The current Chair of World Rugby is Brett Robinson who was elected following the Executive Council vote on 14 November 2024.

Previous chairmen include Bill Beaumont (2008 to 2024), Bernard Lapasset (2008 to 2016), Syd Millar (2002 to 2007) and Vernon Pugh, QC (1994 to 2002).

In July 2012, Brett Gosper was appointed as the new Chief Executive of what was then the IRB. He will leave this role at the end of 2020 to become head of the National Football League's operations in Europe.

== Funding ==
In 2013, World Rugby released £18.6 million of funding over three years for developing rugby in Canada, the United States, Japan, Romania, Fiji, Samoa, and Tonga. Argentina also received additional support to enable it to retain its tier one status. The money, built up from successful World Cups, was released following a report commissioned by World Rugby highlighting the growing disparity between tier one and tier two nations. This is in addition to the £10–12 million it normally gives out grants and tournament costs. The emphasis is on three areas infrastructure, high performance units and cross border competitions. In April 2006, tier-3 rugby nations Georgia, Portugal, Tunisia and Russia were identified as key investment nations over the next three years. The program was designed to increase the competitiveness of international rugby union.

== Tournaments ==
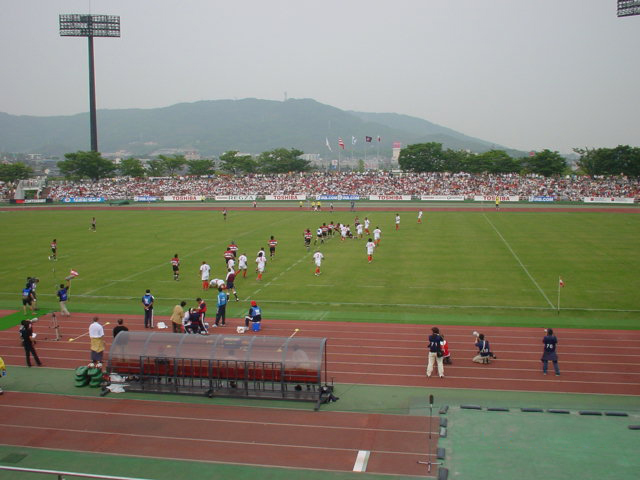
Japan playing Tonga in the Pacific Five Nations, 2006.

=== Rugby World Cups ===
- Women's Rugby World Cup
- Rugby World Cup

World Rugby organises the Rugby World Cup, the sport's most recognised and most profitable competition, which has been held every four years since 1987. Despite the profitability of the World Cup, the majority of its revenues and viewers come from a small number of countries. For the 2007 Rugby World Cup final, 97% of viewers came from the founding nations, including: England, France, Wales, Ireland, Scotland, South Africa, Australia, and New Zealand, with just 3% of viewers coming from all other countries.

The most recent Rugby World Cup was held in France in 2023. South Africa defeated New Zealand 12–11 in the Rugby World Cup final, winning a record fourth title.

World Rugby also organises the women's Rugby World Cup, also held every four years. It was first held by the IRB in 1998, though tournaments in 1991 and 1994 were retrospectively recognised in 2009. The women's World Cup is contested by fewer teams than the men's Cup, with only the 1998 and 2002 editions featuring more than 12 teams (these competitions both had 16 teams, compared to the 20 teams in the men's Rugby World Cup).

On 21 August 2019, World Rugby announced that all future men's and women's World Cups would officially be known as "Rugby World Cup", with no sex or gender designations. The first tournament to be affected by this policy was the 2021 Rugby World Cup, for women's team in New Zealand.

=== Sevens ===
- SVNS
- Women's SVNS
- SVNS 2

The men's season-long annual Sevens Series took place over 10 legs, each held in a different country. The women's Sevens Series is held over five- or six-legs. Both tournaments followed the same principle—points are awarded based on a teams position in each round of the series, and the team with the most points at the end of the Series is crowned champions. Following the inclusion of rugby sevens into the Olympics, beginning with the 2014–15 series, the series prior to an Olympic event (i.e. the series which ends in the year before the Olympics takes place) forms the first phase of Olympic qualification. When Olympic Qualification was included, the top four teams from both the men's and women's series qualified for the Olympic Games, and remaining teams competed in regional competitions for one of the remaining places.

==== Rebrand to SVNS ====
In 2023 World Rugby re-branded the Sevens series to a new SVNS Series known as the HSBC SVNS. The new format will showcase the twelve best men's and women's teams, which will conclude in a Grand Final weekend where the top eight teams will compete to be crowned Series champions. The teams ranked ninth to twelfth will compete against the top four teams from a new Challenger Series in a relegation play-off to see who secures their place in the 2024–2025 season. Both men and women's teams will earn the same with equal participation fees. Both men and women will play in joint tournaments in eight cities around the world. Starting in December 2023 in Dubai, Cape Town, Perth, Vancouver, Los Angeles, Hong Kong, Singapore and will conclude in Madrid in June 2024. The tournament is set to bring about a festival type atmosphere and serve as a build up to the Paris 2024 Olympic Games.

==== Discountinued ====
The quadrennial Rugby World Cup Sevens included both the men's and women's world cup tournaments. It was discontinued after the inclusion of rugby sevens into the Olympic Programme. However, it was later decided to retain the tournament, as it involved a significantly larger number of teams than the Olympics would, and to move the tournament so as to create a more even sevens calendar (with the major sevens events alternating every two years). As a result, the most recent tournament was the 2022 Rugby World Cup Sevens in Cape Town, South Africa. The men's competition at this event was won by Fiji and the women's competition at this event was won Australia.

=== Developmental competitions ===
World Rugby organizes annual international competitions involving Tier 2 nations.

- Nations Cup: A new biennial international competition starting in 2026, will participate twelve teams and will be played across the July and November international windows.
- Pacific Nations Cup, which has been played annually since 2006. The national teams of Fiji, Samoa, Japan, Tonga, Canada and the United States currently compete for the cup. At various times in the past, the national teams of Japan, Georgia, Canada, and the United States, plus second-tier representative sides from Australia and New Zealand, have also been involved.
- Americas Rugby Championship, whose current incarnation involves Argentina's "A" side, currently branded as Argentina XV, and the full national teams of Brazil, Canada, Chile, Uruguay, and the USA.

=== Junior competitions ===
World Rugby organizes two competitions for under-20 national teams, the World Rugby Junior World Championship and the World Rugby Under 20 Trophy. These competitions were created following the merger of under-19 and under-21 representative teams, into an under-20 age group

=== Current title holders ===
| Tournament | Tournament Champions | Year |
|---|---|---|
| Rugby World Cup | South Africa | 2023 |
| Women's Rugby World Cup | England | 2025 |
| The Rugby Championship | South Africa | 2025 |
| Six Nations | France | 2026 |
| Women's Six Nations | England | 2026 |
| Pacific Nations Cup | Fiji | 2025 |
| SVNS Series Men's | South Africa | 2025–26 |
| SVNS Series Women's | New Zealand | 2025–26 |
| SVNS Men's Grand Final | South Africa | 2026 |
| SVNS Women's Grand Final | Australia | 2026 |
| Rugby World Cup Sevens | Fiji (men) | 2022 |
| Rugby World Cup Sevens | Australia (women) | 2022 |
| Olympic Games | France (men) | 2024 |
| Olympic Games | New Zealand (women) | 2024 |
| Commonwealth Games | South Africa (men) | 2022 |
| Commonwealth Games | Australia (women) | 2022 |
| World Rugby Under 20 Championship | South Africa | 2026 |
| World Rugby Under 20 Trophy | Scotland | 2024 |
| U20 Rugby Championship | South Africa | 2026 |
| Six Nations Under 20s Championship | France | 2026 |

=== International windows ===
Outside of tournaments ran by World Rugby, the body enforces a number of international windows throughout the year to allow further competition between member nations:

- February/March: Six Nations Championship
- June/July: Mid-year rugby union internationals (Southern hemisphere teams hosts Northern hemisphere teams)
- August/September: SANZAAR The Rugby Championship
- October/November: End-of-year rugby union internationals (Northern hemisphere teams hosts Southern hemisphere teams)

The June/July and October/November windows have been reorganised as of 2026 to accommodate the Nations Championship for Six Nations sides, Rugby Championship sides and Fiji and Japan, the tournament being organised by the Six Nations and SANZAAR, and the World Rugby Nations Cup for the top Rugby Europe International Championships teams, the remaining World Rugby Pacific Nations Cup teams plus Uruguay, Chile, Zimbabwe and Hong Kong China, organised by World Rugby.

== Olympics ==
The sport of rugby union has been played at the Summer Olympics on four occasions, with the last being in 1924. The winners, and thus the reigning champions, were the U.S. team. Rugby union made one more appearance as a demonstration event but was then removed from the Games. World Rugby has most recently been very keen to see it return to the Games and is adamant that the sport (specifically referring to rugby sevens) satisfies every respect of the criteria set out in the Olympic Charter.

The main problem for reintroducing the 15-man game to the Olympics is the 4-day turnaround required by World Rugby regulations for players to rest between games. Since the Olympics only officially run for 16 days, with only slight expansions allowed to accommodate sports such as football, this effectively makes it impossible to conduct a 15s tournament within the current Olympic schedule. This limitation does not apply to sevens, as games last only 14 minutes instead of the 80 minutes in the 15s game. All of the events in the current men's and women's Sevens Series, which feature a minimum of 16 national teams for men and 12 for women, are conducted within a single weekend.

But in furthering the World Rugby cause, the organisation became an International Olympic Committee Recognised International Federation in 1995, marked by a ceremonial signing by President Juan Antonio Samaranch prior to a match between Wales and South Africa in Cardiff.

World Rugby cites rugby union's global participation, with men playing the game in well over 100 countries and women playing in over 50 as well; the organisation's compliance with the World Anti-Doping Code; and that a rugby sevens tournament could be (and generally is) accommodated in one stadium and is relatively inexpensive to play. Not only is the sevens game successful in the context of the Sevens World Series and World Cup Sevens, it is also very successfully played in the Commonwealth Games; the sevens tournament at the 2006 Games in Melbourne set all-time attendance records for a sevens tournament.

As a result of this, World Rugby applied to the International Olympic Committee for a Sevens tournament to form part of the Olympics. Subsequently, Sevens was accepted into the Summer Olympic Games and was first played in 2016 in Rio de Janeiro which was won by Fiji in the men's competition (defeating Great Britain) and by Australia in the women's competition (defeating New Zealand). In the Tokyo Olympics 2020 edition, the Fiji 7s men's team and the New Zealand 7s women's team claimed the gold medals in their respective competitions.

== Laws and regulations ==
The laws of rugby union are controlled by a standing Laws Committee, which is established by the World Rugby Council. The current chairman of the committee is Bill Beaumont. The Laws of the Game are formulated by World Rugby, and are then circulated by the national Unions. The official laws of the game are written in English, French, Russian and Spanish. There are variations for under-19 and Sevens rugby. There are 21 regulations in total, these regulations range from definitions, eligibility, advertising, disciplinary, anti-doping and a number of other areas. World Rugby also approves equipment, which are tested at an Approved Testing House.

=== Experimental law variations ===
In 2006, the IRB initiated proposals for variations to the laws, which were formulated and trialled initially at Stellenbosch University in South Africa. Further trials were set down for 2007 and 2008. The law variations aimed to push the balance between defensive and attacking play more in favour of attacking play, and to reduce stoppages for penalties and infringements.

=== Anti-doping ===
World Rugby is compliant with the WADA code. The World Rugby anti doping programme includes testing at the under 19 and under 21 level, sevens and senior 15 a side. Testing is a mix of in-competition at World Rugby organised events, as well as out-of-competition testing, which can occur during a specified one-hour time slot designated by a player. In 2003, World Cup year, the World Rugby member unions undertook approximately 3,000 tests. "Keep Rugby Clean" is a campaign message run by the World Rugby Anti-Doping Manager Tim Ricketts. The programme is supported by stars such as Brian O'Driscoll.

== World rankings ==
World Rugby publishes and maintains the World Rugby Rankings of the men's national rugby union teams (and more recently also for women's teams). The concept was launched in October 2003, at the start of that year's world cup in Australia. The rankings are calculated using a Points Exchange system, whereby nations take points off each other based on a match result. Several years of research went into developing the rankings system, using an extensive database of international matches that date back to 1871.

The system's reliability is assessed in a number of objective ways, which includes predictions of current strength and responds to changes in form. The system takes into account home advantage, in that the home nation is treated as though it has an extra three rating points, effectively handicapping them, as they will gain fewer ranking points for a win, and lose more should they lose. In the case of a freak result, there is a maximum number of movements on the ranking that any nation can gain from one match.

If a nation does not play for a number of years they are considered dormant, and excluded from the rankings, upon returning, picking up from where they were excluded. If a nation is to merge or split, the highest rating of any of the rankings is inherited.

Currently all capped international matches are equally weighted, whether or not they take place within a competition or are played as tests; the sole exception to this is the World Cup final tournament.

== Recognitions and awards ==
The World Rugby Awards were introduced in 2001, to honour outstanding achievements in rugby union. Prior to 2009, all of the awards were announced at an annual ceremony; the most recent such ceremony was held in London on 23 November 2008.

However, as a response to the Great Recession, the annual ceremony only saw the International Player, Team, and Coach of the Year Awards presented in 2009 and 2010; all other awards were presented at different times throughout the year. The IRB reinstated a single year-end ceremony in 2011 after the 2011 Rugby World Cup. Since then, it has chosen to present some awards at times relevant to those specific prizes—such as Sevens awards after the London Sevens, the final event of the Sevens World Series, and the Junior Player award after the final of the Junior World Championship. The bulk of awards will be presented at the year-end Awards ceremony.

The current awards are:

- World Rugby Men's 15s Player of the Year
- World Rugby Women's 15s Player of the Year
- World Rugby Men's Sevens Player of the Year
- World Rugby Women's Sevens Player of the Year
- World Rugby Junior Player of the Year
- Vernon Pugh Award for Distinguished Service
- World Rugby Coach of the Year
- World Rugby Men's 15s Breakthrough Player of the Year
- World Rugby Women's 15s Breakthrough Player of the Year
- World Rugby Referee Award
- World Rugby Women's 15s Dream Team of the Year
- World Rugby Men's 15s Dream Team of the Year
- World Rugby Team of the Year

At the year-end ceremony, the International Rugby Players' Association also hands out the following awards:

- IRP Men's Try of the Year
- IRP Women's Try of the Year
- IRP Special Merit Award

In the past, the following awards have also been awarded:

- IRB International U21 Player of the Year
- IRB Under 19 Player of the Year
- IRB Chairman's Award
- IRB Development Award
- IRB Spirit of Rugby Award

The awards that recognise achievements in the preceding 12 months tend to be won by that season's most successful nation(s): France in 2002, England in 2003, South Africa in 2004, New Zealand in 2005, South Africa again in 2007. For those award categories that have nominees, a shortlist is drawn up by an independent panel of judges, who are all former internationals. The panel then reconvenes to choose a winner. The current judges are Jonathan Davies, Will Greenwood, Gavin Hastings, Michael Jones, Dan Lyle, Federico Méndez, Francois Pienaar and past Player of the Year winners Fabien Galthié and Keith Wood, with John Eales as convenor. The judges have a total of over 500 caps between them.

In 2006 a Hall of Fame was established to chronicle the achievements and special contribution of the sport's players, coaches, administrators, match officials, institutions and other individuals. The Hall of Fame was inaugurated at the 2006 IRB Awards, when William Webb Ellis and Rugby School were named as the first two inductees. Hall of Fame inductees in 2007 were Pierre de Coubertin, Danie Craven, John Eales, Gareth Edwards and Wilson Whineray. The 2008 inductees were the 1888–89 New Zealand Native football team and its organiser Joe Warbrick, Jack Kyle, Melrose RFC and Ned Haig (for their roles in the invention of rugby sevens), Hugo Porta, and Philippe Sella. Since then, induction ceremonies have been held annually, except in 2010.

The last year for a single induction ceremony was 2009. Starting in 2011, ceremonies have been held at multiple locations around the world. Also, some or all of the inductions have had an overriding theme since 2009:

- 2009 – Lions tours to South Africa; all candidates for induction were either Lions or Springboks.
- 2011 – The year's final set of inductions, held at the IRB Awards in Auckland on the night after the 2011 Rugby World Cup final, was, according to the IRB, "under the theme of Rugby World Cup founders, visionaries and iconic figures".
- 2012 – The IRB's theme for this year's inductions was Rugby - a global Game, "celebrat[ing] Rugby's expansion to become a global sport played by millions of men and women worldwide."

== Media and Digital Platforms ==
In 2022 World Rugby acquired the media platform RugbyPass. In 2023 they expanded the RugbyPass brand by creating RugbyPass TV a free live match streaming and on demand service featuring rugby matches from around the world, as well as other forms of digital media such as podcasts and documentaries.

== UK neurological injuries lawsuit ==
In December 2023 a group of 295 former rugby players sued World Rugby, the Rugby Football Union and the Welsh Rugby Union for allegedly failing to put in place reasonable measures to protect the health and safety of players. This alleged failure was said to have caused disorders such as motor neurone disease, early onset dementia, chronic traumatic encephalopathy, epilepsy and Parkinson's disease.

== Sources ==
- "Handbook 2013" (PDF). International Rugby Board. 2013. Archived from the original (PDF) on 28 May 2014.
- "Handbook 2014" (PDF). World Rugby. 2014. Archived from the original (PDF) on 8 February 2015.
- "Handbook 2016" (PDF). World Rugby. 2016. Archived from the original (PDF 8.9 MB) on 14 May 2016.
- "Handbook 2017" (PDF). World Rugby. 3 January 2017. Archived from the original (PDF) on 17 April 2017.
- "Year in Review 2011" (PDF). International Rugby Board. 2011. Archived (PDF) from the original on 5 October 2012.
- "World Rugby Year in Review 2019". World Rugby. 2019.
