= RC Locomotive Tbilisi =

Georgian rugby union club, based in Tbilisi

(Georgia (country)) RC Locomotive Tbilisi
- Full name: Rugby Club Locomotive Tbilisi
- Founded: 1964
- Location: Tbilisi, Georgia
- Ground: Avchala (Capacity: 2,500)
- League: Didi 10

Rugby Club Locomotive Tbilisi is a Georgian professional rugby union club from Tbilisi, who plays in the Georgia Championship, the first division of Georgian rugby.

== Achievements ==
- Georgia Championship:
  - Winner (9): 1992, 1994, 2000, 2001, 2003, 2005, 2006, 2008, 2010, 2018
  - Runner-up (3): 1967, 1990, 1991
  - Third place (11): 1968, 1972, 1978, 1981, 1995, 1996, 1999, 2002, 2007, 2009, 2011
- Georgia Cup:
  - Winners (7): 1978, 1992, 2000, 2003, 2004, 2005, 2006

=== Notable players ===
- (Georgia (country)) Shalva Mamukashvili
- (Georgia (country)) Guram Gogichashvili
- (Georgia (country)) Beka Kakabadze
- (Georgia (country)) Beka Bitsadze
- (Georgia (country)) Giorgi Begadze
- (Georgia (country)) Giorgi Aptsiauri
- (Georgia (country)) Bidzina Samkharadze
- (Georgia (country)) Giorgi Shkinin
- (Georgia (country)) Beka Tsiklauri

== See also ==
- Rugby union in Georgia
- http://site.rugby.ge/ka-GE/Lokomotivi/
