= Guram Gogichashvili =

Georgian rugby union player

- Born: 4 September 1998 (age 28) Khashuri, Georgia
- Height: 1.84 m (6 ft 0 in)
- Weight: 118 kg (260 lb; 18 st 8 lb)

Rugby union career
- Position: Prop
- Current team: Racing 92
Senior career
| Years | Team | Apps | (Points) |
| 2016–2018 | Locomotive | 16 | (10) |
| 2018– | Racing 92 | 86 | (10) |
- Correct as of 12 May 2023
International career
| Years | Team | Apps | (Points) |
| 2017–2018 | Georgia U20 | 6 | (5) |
| 2018– | Georgia | 37 | (10) |
- Correct as of 12 May 2023

Guram Gogichashvili (Georgian: გურამ გოგიჩაშვილი; born 4 September 1998) is a Georgian professional rugby union player who plays as a prop for Top 14 club Racing 92 and the Georgia national team.

== Professional career ==
Gogichashvili began his career in 2016 with Locomotive in the Georgia Championship.
