= Lelo burti =

Georgian folk sport

Lelo or lelo burti (Georgian: ლელო ბურთი), literally a "field ball [playing]", is a Georgian folk sport, which is a full contact ball game, and very similar to rugby. Within Georgian rugby union terminology, the word lelo is used to mean a try, and the popularity of rugby union in Georgia has also been attributed to it. In 2014, lelo burti, along with khridoli, a traditional martial art, was inscribed by the government of Georgia as a "nonmaterial monument" of culture.

It appears in the 12th century Georgian epic poem The Knight in the Panther's Skin in which the characters play lelo burti.

== Traditional varieties ==
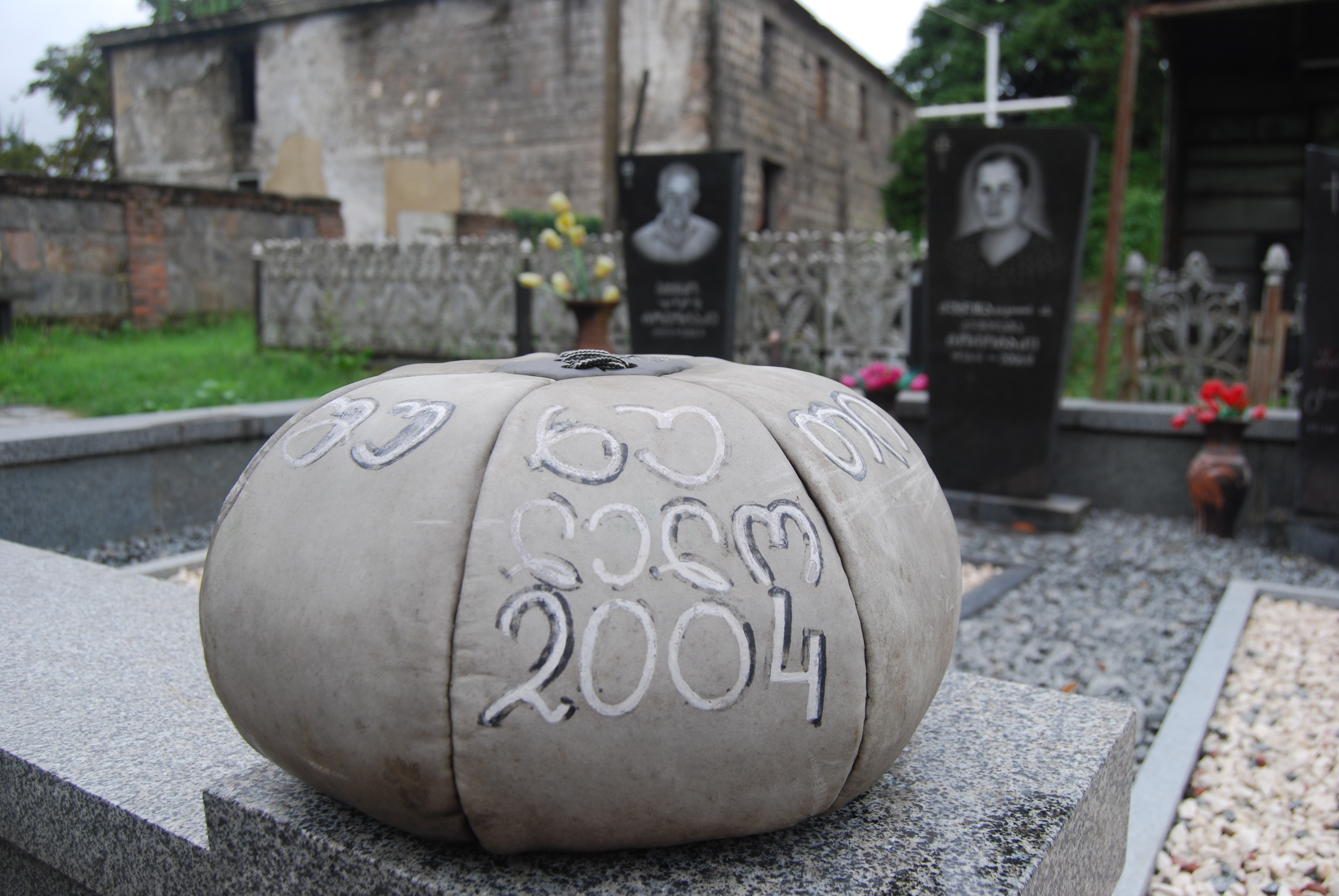
A Lelo ball at the Shukhuti cemetery.

Lelo was played in Georgia from ancient times and is still played on occasions in rural areas. A field ("Lelo") would be selected and

"In earlier times, the lelo teams would consist of a few dozen players each, and the field would sometimes have to be crossed by a stream, which the players would have to ford in pursuit of the ball."

Sometimes the playing field was between two water courses. The two teams, usually consisting of the male population of neighbouring villages, would face each other. The number of players from each side was not set traditionally, but included any able men each village could summon. A large, heavy ball was placed in the middle of the field and the goal of the game was to carry it over the river to the "half" of the opposing side.

"The game took place over a wide area sometimes stretching for several kilometres on very rough ground. The contestants would have to contend with spurs, hills, valleys, woods. cascading streams and marshes. Their task was to get a ball into a certain place, say, over the settlement boundary or to the foot of the mountain. Any means necessary could be employed to drive the ball forward — feet or hands. Sometimes they would play the game on horseback."

It was believed that the winning team would secure a better harvest for their village.

== Standardised version ==
During the Soviet Period, lelo became standardised:

"Nowadays lelo is played according to strictly defined rules on a proper pitch of 90-135 m in length and 60-90m in width. The match ball is round and made of leather, filled with grass, horsehair or sheep's wool. It weighs 2.5 kg and is 85-90 cm long."

This standardised version features fifteen-a-side teams (as per rugby union), and forward passing (in contrast to rugby football). Players are allowed to knock the ball out of opponents' hands, but unlike American football the blocking of opponents without the ball is not allowed. The pushing and tripping (or hacking) of opponents is also disallowed, and players are not allowed to jump on them. The object is to get the ball into the goal mouth, which is known as a mak.

Players are also only allowed to carry the ball for five seconds before passing. The game consists of two halves of thirty minutes, with a ten-minute interval.

== Georgia: the "Lelos" ==
The Lelos (as they are nicknamed) are the national rugby union team of Georgia. One standard cheer of Georgian rugby union fans is Lelo, Lelo, Sakartvelo (Try, Try, Georgia).

== See also ==
- Folk football
- Marn grook
- Yubi lakpi
- Georgian Wrestling
