= Beka Kakabadze =

Georgian rugby union player

- Born: September 7, 1995 (age 31) Kutaisi, Georgia
- Height: 1.82 m (5 ft 11 1/2 in)
- Weight: 115 kg (18 st 2 lb)

Rugby union career
- Position: Loosehead Prop
Senior career
Years	Team	Apps	(Points)
2012-2015	Locomotive	22	(5)
2015-2020	Clermont	31	(0)
2020-2022	Oyonnax Rugby	26	(0)
2022	Union Cognac Saint-Jean-d'Angély	6	(0)
2022-2024	RC Suresnes	8	(0)
2024-2025	US Issoire		
- Correct as of 22 May 2018
International career
Years	Team	Apps	(Points)
2015-2016	Georgia U20	11	(5)
- Correct as of 30 September 2017

Beka Kakabadze (born September 7, 1995) is a Georgian rugby union player. He plays for US Issoire in Federal 1 since 2024.

He joined ASM Clermont Auvergne in 2015 and made his professional debut with the club in 2017.

In 2020, he joined Oyonnax Rugby.
