= Khridoli =

Martial art in Georgia

- Country of origin: (Georgia (country)) Georgia
- Olympic sport: No

Khridoli (Georgian: ხრიდოლი) is an eclectic martial art from Georgia. It consists of five components, namely khardiorda (wrestling), krivi (boxing), p'arikaoba (fencing), rkena (throws and grabs also seen in Sambo and judo), and archery.

Historically, khridoli was a name of one-handed boxing, especially popular in old Tbilisi as documented by the writer Ioseb Grishashvili in his historical dictionary of the city. In one type of khridoli dueling, the challenger had to fight with one hand tied, while the challenged man had a privilege to use both of his hands. After Georgia became independent of the Soviet Union, a revived interest in old martial arts led to the foundation of Khridoli Federation in 1993. In 2014, khridoli, along with lelo burti, a local sport similar to rugby, was inscribed by the government of Georgia as a "nonmaterial monument" of culture.
