= Rugby union in Georgia =

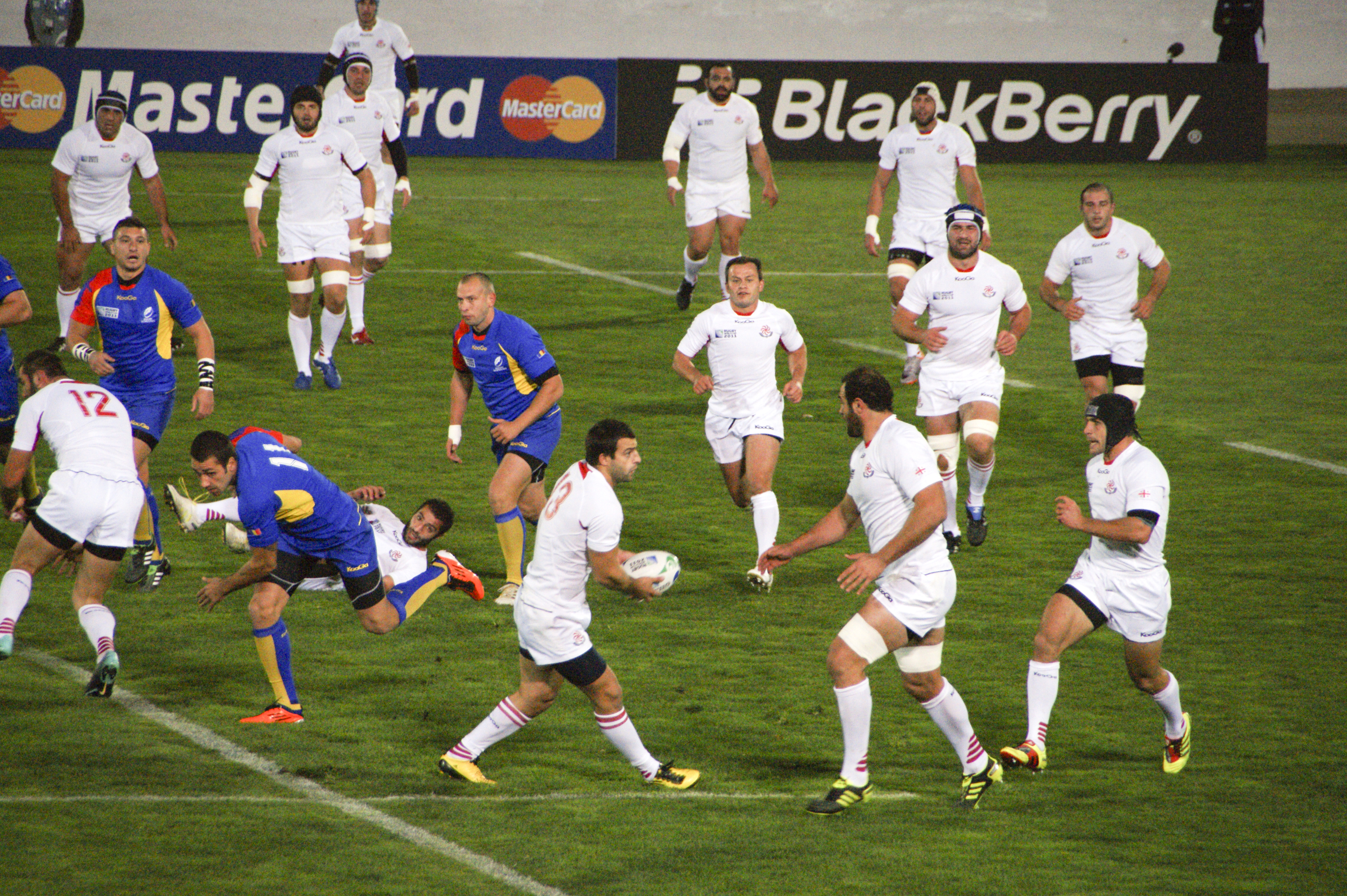
- Georgia vs. Romania in the Rugby World Cup 2011
- Country: Georgia
- Governing body: Georgia Rugby Union
- National team: Georgia
- Nickname: Lelos
- First played: 1928
- Registered players: 9,400
- Clubs: 68

National competitions
- Rugby World Cup; Rugby World Cup Sevens; SVNS; Rugby Europe Championship

Club competitions
- Didi 10; Georgian First League; Regional League West; Regional League East - 1st group Regional League East - 2nd group Georgia Cup

Rugby union in Georgia is a popular team sport. Rugby union is considered one of the most popular sports in Georgia.

== Governing body ==
The governing body for rugby union in Georgia is the Georgia Rugby Union. It was founded in 1961 (as a domestic body) and became an official affiliate to the International Rugby Board (IRB) in 1992.

== History ==
=== Prehistory ===
Like some other rugby playing nations, the popularity of the game in Georgia can be traced back to a pre-existing Georgian folk sport, called lelo or Lelo Burti (meaning literally in Georgian "Field Ball"), which is a full contact ball game, and very similar to rugby. In fact, even within Georgian rugby terminology, the word lelo is used to mean a try.

Lelo was played in Georgia from ancient times and is still played on occasions in rural areas. A field ("Lelo") was selected between two river creeks which represented a playing ground. Two teams, usually consisting of the male population of neighboring villages, would face each other, with the local priest acting as the referee. The number of players from each side was not set, but included any able men each village could summon. A large, heavy ball was placed in the middle of the field and the goal of the game was to carry it over the river creek of the opposing side.

=== Soviet period ===
During the Soviet period, the Georgians regularly had six or seven players in the USSR side, before the break-up, as well as supplying the Soviet club champion, Dinamo Tbilisi. Rugby has been played in Georgia since the 1930s, possibly earlier, but its first official test was against a touring Zimbabwe side.

There were several unsuccessful attempts to introduce rugby into Georgia, the earliest known being in 1928, with subsequent attempts also in 1940 and in 1948. Rugby was introduced to Georgia by Jacques Haspekian, an Armenian man from Marseille in France who taught the game to students in the late 1950s through to the mid-1960s, although he then subsequently returned in France. He was interviewed on French radio on the occasion of Georgia playing France in the 2007 Rugby World Cup. The very first rugby session was held on October 15, 1959, in Tbilisi, at the racecourse, where 20 people attended the meeting. The first Georgian club formed was the GPI (Georgian Polytechnical Institute), now known as "Qochebi".

In 1961, a three team domestic competition was formed, called the Tbilisi Championship. The following year the first match between a Georgian team and a Russian team took place, with Trud Moscow defeating the Georgian club. That year Georgian clubs also went on their first tours, going to Russia and Latvia.

In 1962, the first Soviet Trade-Union tournament was held. In the same year, ten new rugby teams were established in Georgia.

In 1964 the Tbilisi Rugby Section became known as the Georgia Rugby Federation. From the mid-1960s, the Soviet Championship and the Soviet Cup were introduced for competitive club competition between Soviet rugby clubs, with the first competition being held in 1966. The Georgian clubs were formed as regional selections fed by student teams. The best players would go on to make the USSR team.

A Moscow team won the first Soviet Championship, though Dynamo from Tbilisi came in second place. In 1967 a French trade-union selection visited Georgia. It would not be until 1978, in the Soviet Cup (which was introduced in 1976) that a Georgian team would finish first, which was Locomotivi from Tbilisi. Georgian teams dominated the Soviet Championship and the Soviet Cup in the late 1980s with Kutaisi winning the championship in 1987 and 1988 and RC AIA Kutaisi winning in 1989 and 1990. In 1988 Georgia produced their first national sevens side.

=== Post-independence ===
The break-up of the Soviet Union led to a civil war, which helped set back the game greatly, and the recent Russian conflict with Georgia has also set it on a back foot. Half of all Soviet clubs were in Georgia. The Georgians applied for associate membership of the IRB in 1990, but were turned down. It took two years for the IRB to admit them in 1990, after consultation with the Soviet Federation.

The following year, Georgia played their first international match, against Zimbabwe, and won 16 to 3. With the collapse of the Soviet Union, Georgia formed their own national team (though a CIS team played in the early 1990s) and applied for International Rugby Football Board (now, International Rugby Board) membership. In 1993 the IRFB accepted Georgia as a federation member, making them the 52nd member.

In 1997, New Zealand coach Ross Meurant found the national team had only two practice balls, when he went to advise the Georgia Under-19 squad. This was typical of the lack of resources that the Georgians faced. Meurant said that the tackle bags that they were using were improvised:

They were of denim material, obviously stitched together on a domestic sewing machine and stuffed with rubber.

—

The wife of another coach had stayed up half the night making them. This was not atypical. In the early 1990s, the Georgians had converted old Soviet era tractors into scrum machines.

In 1994 the Gumari were formed, being the Georgian Barbarians, and they went on to tour France. The following year saw the inauguration of the Sini competition. Their 1998 loss to Romania saw Georgia face Tonga in a repechage match to enter the 1999 Rugby World Cup in Wales. Georgia lost and thus did not make it to the World Cup. Though in 2001 they won the European Nations Cup, and became the 7th highest ranked team in Europe. They subsequently got through the qualifying stages for the next World Cup, and made it to Australia for the 2003 Rugby World Cup. They also qualified for the 2007 World Cup and went on to win their first World Cup match.

Crowds as large as 10–15,000 regularly attend local derbies in Tbilisi.

As Georgia is a member of the Council of Europe, this gives Georgians employment rights within France, and many Georgian players are now based there. For example, in the qualifiers for the 2007 Rugby World Cup against Ireland, 18 of 25 players on the squad were based in France.

Notable players include Giorgi Shkinin, and captain Ilia Zedginidze who was considered something of a Renaissance Man in World Cup rugby as a talented international lawyer with the ability to speak several languages fluently.

== Competitions ==
The Georgia Championship and Georgia Cup are the domestic rugby union club competitions in Georgia. Since most of the Georgian internationals play in France, its quality level does not match the popularity of rugby union across the country. A combination domestic side, The Black Lion, owned by the Georgian Rugby Union, was created to take part in international club competition. Originally entered into the European third tier Rugby Europe Super Cup, they are two time winners. The team were invited to take part in South Africa's traditional provincial competition, the Currie Cup in 2022, before finally being admitted to the main competition system in Europe, invited to take part in the 2023-24 EPCR Challenge Cup, the second tier continental competition.

Level	League(s)/Division(s)		
1	Didi 10 (10 teams)		
2	First League (10 teams)		
2	Regional League West (6 teams)	Regional League East - 1st group (7 teams)	Regional League East - 2nd group (6 teams)

== Popularity ==
Rugby union is one of the most popular sports in Georgia. Rugby is especially popular in the south of the country where the game is more popular than association football. The popularity of rugby union largely took off after the Georgia Rugby Union's inception into the IRB. This has seen rugby union become a major spectator sport. There are currently 2866 registered male players in Georgia according to the International Rugby Board. When Georgia played Russia in the European Nations Cup, 65,000 people crammed into the national stadium in Tbilisi and another 44,000 watched Georgia beat Russia 17–13.

== National team ==
The Lelos (as they are nicknamed) are the national rugby union team of Georgia. The team's name comes from lelo, an indigenous Georgian sport with strong similarities to rugby. Lelo has been adopted as the Georgian word for "try". One standard cheer of Georgian rugby union fans is Lelo, Lelo, Sakartvelo (Try, Try, Georgia). The Lelos participate in the European Nations Cup, which is a second-level competition for European national teams. The majority of the national side are based in France, in the lower divisions, having been sent there to improve their rugby skills and facilitate their development by coach Claude Saurel.

=== World Cup ===
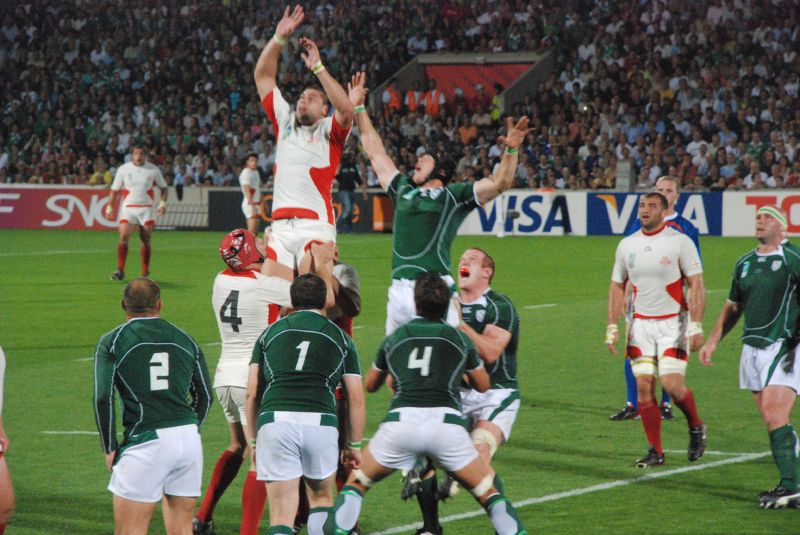
Ireland playing Georgia in the 2007 Rugby World Cup.

Prior to the 2003 Rugby World Cup, Georgia had failed to qualify for any previous tournaments, despite coming close in 1999 after losing a two legged repechage play-off against Tonga. On that occasion Georgia lost the first leg 37–6 in Nukuʻalofa before recording a 28–27 win in Tbilisi. Georgia then bounced back to defeat Russia 17–13 to qualify for the subsequent 2003 Rugby World Cup. They lost all four of their matches but impressed against South Africa. Despite the poor financial state of the Georgia Rugby Union, qualification has seen the sport's profile enjoy a huge rise in popularity throughout Georgia. Their best performance was in 2015 tournament, when they were drawn against eventual world champions New Zealand, Argentina, Tonga and Namibia. Georgia won games against Tonga and Namibia, finished third in the group and automatically qualified for 2019 Rugby World Cup.

=== European Nations Cup ===
The European Nations Cup is a second-level competition for tier-two European nations. Initially started as a one-year competition, the championship is now decided over two years with each team playing each other on a home and away basis. Georgia have won the competition on eight occasions, in 2001, 2008-9 and 2011–15.

=== The Antim Cup ===
The Antim Cup is contested between Georgia and Romania. The cup is contested each time Georgia and Romania meet in a senior international match other than World Cup matches or qualifiers. The holder retains the cup unless the challenger wins the match in normal time. It is named after the Romanian Orthodox Metropolitan Antim Iverianul, who came from Georgia.

== See also ==
- Georgia Rugby Union
- Georgia at the Rugby World Cup
- Georgia national rugby union team
- Georgia A national rugby union team
- Tbilisi Caucasians
- Rugby league in Georgia
