= Gridiron =

Gridiron may refer to:

== Sports and games ==
- Gridiron, the playing field for gridiron football
- Gridiron (card game), a football-themed collectible card game
- Gridiron!, 1986 sports video game developed by Bethesda Softworks
- GridIron Master, a board game

== Organizations ==
- Gridiron (secret society), at the University of Georgia
- Gridiron Club, a journalistic organization in Washington, DC, USA
- The Gridiron Club (Oxford University), an undergraduate club founded in 1884

== Arts and entertainment ==
- Gridiron (novel), a 1995 science fiction novel
- Captain Grid-Iron, a G.I. Joe character
- Grid Iron Theatre Company, in Scotland

== Other uses ==
- Gridiron (cooking), a type of grill
- Gridiron, Sonora, a steamboat landing in Mexico
- Gridiron plan, in urban planning
- Gridiron deck, a working surface above a theater stage
- Gridiron pendulum, a clock part
- Operation Flight Gridiron, a World War II rescue operation
