= Rugby union in Zambia =

- Country: Zambia
- Governing body: Zambia Rugby Football Union
- National team: Zambia
- First played: Late nineteenth century
- Registered players: 9880

National competitions
- Rugby World Cup; Rugby World Cup Sevens; IRB Sevens World Series

Rugby union in Zambia is a minor but growing sport. The Zambia national rugby union team is currently ranked 67th by World Rugby. The Zambia Rugby Football Union has 9880 registered players and three formally organised clubs.

The governing body is the Zambia Rugby Football Union, which was founded in 1965, and affiliated to the IRFB in 1995.

== History ==
Not unlike other neighbouring African countries, Zambian rugby has been a legacy of British colonialism. Traditionally rugby in Zambia was seen as an expatriate sport, however, over the last 20 years it has become a truly Zambian sport with the majority of its players coming up through the schools and local club system.

Fifteens (XVs) rugby in Zambia is played at a basic level compared to the major rugby playing nations.

Zambia has over the last seven years developed a 7s tournament, the Lusaka Mosi International Sevens. Past winners include the Springbok under-23s and the British Army. Zambia has beaten a number of South African Super 14 teams who have participated.

It should be remembered that Northern Rhodesia played jointly with Southern Rhodesia as RHODESIA wearing the famous Green and White hooped jersey as their international strip. In 1924 a British side would play against the Rhodesias. On 14 July 1928, Rhodesia played in Bulawayo against New Zealand, losing 8 to 44.

During their 1938 tour to South Africa, the British Lions played two matches against the Rhodesias. The first, taking place on 20 July saw the British win 25 to 11; three days later the British won again, 45 to 11; these matches were played in Salisbury and Bulawayo. The 1949 Rhodesian Rugby team, led by John Morkel, beat a touring All Blacks side led by Fred Allen in Bulawayo 10-8 on 27 July 1949. Three days later they drew with the All Blacks in Salisbury 3-3. Thus the Rhodesias not only became and remain the only non test side country in the world to beat the All Blacks but also one of only 7 national sides (the others being test nations - British Lions, South Africa, Australia, France, Ireland and Argentina) to have won a series against them too. The Northern Rhodesians who played in the 1949 games were: flanker C Jones (Nchanga), scrum half W Viljoen (Copperbelt), Fly half E.U. Karg (Mufulira) and inside centre W.E. Brune (Mufulira)

In 1960, New Zealand returned to play a match on 29 June in Kitwe, Northern Rhodesia against a Rhodesian "A" side and narrowly won 9-13 and then again on 2 July at Glamis Park, Salisbury with a full Rhodesia side losing 14 to 29, though gave the All Blacks a scare yet again, with the game being tied 6 all by half time. The 1962 tour of South Africa by the British Lions had Rhodesia as the opening fixture on the tour. The opening game of the Lions tour saw the visitors win in Bulawayo, beating Rhodesia 38 to 9 on 26 May. The next tour, in 1962, the Lions won in Salisbury, beating the side 32 to 6.

Andy McDonald played for the Springboks. Colin Meades the All Blacks captain. Other players from that era were Ronnie Hill and Des van Jaarsveld who started their rugby careers in Northern Rhodesia before moving south. Van Jaarsveld went on to captain the Springboks just the once against Scotland and became the first Springbok captain who could not speak Afrikaans.

Northern Rhodesia played against Southern Rhodesia in the Clarke Cup which Northern Rhodesia won more times than Southern Rhodesia. This was largely due to the number of excellent rugby players (Springboks amongst them) working on the Copperbelt at the time. The Northern Rhodesians played in a Royal Blue Jersey with two stripes (white and gold) across the chest whilst the Southerners played in Green with broad white stripe across the chest. The Green/White hooped jersey was originally used by the joint Rhodesian side for international games.

== National teams ==
Sevens rugby has become a strong point. The Zambia national rugby sevens team has beaten Italy and Canada, and came within 30 seconds of upsetting Australia, in the end narrowly losing 11-12. Zambia has appeared on the international stage, both at the South Africa Sevens and the Dubai Sevens.

Zambia also competes in the Africa Cup.

== Club Competition ==
Zambia has an active league that has recently been amended to consist of a Super 8 format with a second league comprising smaller clubs and second teams from the Super 8. The season runs from March to October and consists of a period of time for league matches, a break for sevens rugby.

Most clubs start training in the middle of January ready for the season to begin in March. League matches are played up until the start of June when a break is taken to allow concentration on sevens events. During the months break there are a number of local 7s events including the Rhino Sevens in Ndola, the Mufulira Sevens (the first sevens tournament held in Zambia) and the Mosi Sevens in Lusaka. The league continues again in July and generally runs through to October when the knock out cup competition takes place.

In Lusaka there are four active rugby clubs. Lusaka Rugby Club, Nkwazi rugby team, Green Buffaloes (the army team) and Red Arrows (the air force team) all play within Lusaka Showgrounds (see map on the Lusaka Rugby Club page) and both Lusaka Rugby Club and Red Arrows have an active club house with a number of facilities available for members and signed-in guests.

On the Great North Road between Lusaka and the Copperbelt is the town of Kabwe, home of Green Eagles Rugby Club.

In the Copperbelt, rugby is most popular, near or surpassing football. Towns all have their own rugby teams with a varying degree of facilities available at each club. Diggers Rugby Club in Kitwe has over the past few years been one of the more successful Copperbelt clubs. They also have another team, Diggers B, active in the B-League. Nchanga Rugby Club are in Chingola, Roan Rugby Club are in Luanshya, Konkola Rugby Club is in Chilalabombwe and Mufulira popularly known as 'Reggae Boys', Ndola 'Killer Bees' and Chibuluma each have their own rugby club. Other teams are Kanshanshi in Solwezi, Prison Leopards in Kabwe while Kitwe Playing Fields and Chandesi have clubs in their respective towns.

The Roan Antelope Club in Luanshya formerly held the record for highest goal posts in the world, and were recognised by the Guinness Book of Records - they were 110 ft, 6 inches high.

== Youth ==
Rugby is becoming increasingly popular with it being very active in schools such as Mpelembe Secondary School, Kitwe Boys, David Kaunda Technical School, Icengelo and Lechwe, both of the latter are Trust Schools. Two annual tournaments sponsored First Quantum Minerals (FQM) are hosted, one for Fifteens and the other for Sevens. Mpelembe and Icengelo have been the two most successful. Mpelembe went on to get sponsorship from mobile service provider MTN, which was recently withdrawn.

== Miscellaneous ==
- In the 1990s, Ian Kirkpatrick, late of the All Blacks helped develop the game.
- Corné Krige and George Gregan, who respectively captained the South Africa and Australia teams in both the 2002 and 2003 Tri Nations Series, were coincidentally born in the same hospital in Zambia. Krige's parents still live in Zambia.
- Dafydd James of Wales and the 2001 British & Irish Lions was born in Mufulira.

Bob Hesford, born in Luanshya played for England gaining his first cap against Scotland at Twickenham on 21 February 1981. His position was flanker or wing forward. He played 5 test matches in his career. He also played for the Barbarians.

== See also ==
- Zambia national rugby union team
