= Rugby union in Uganda =

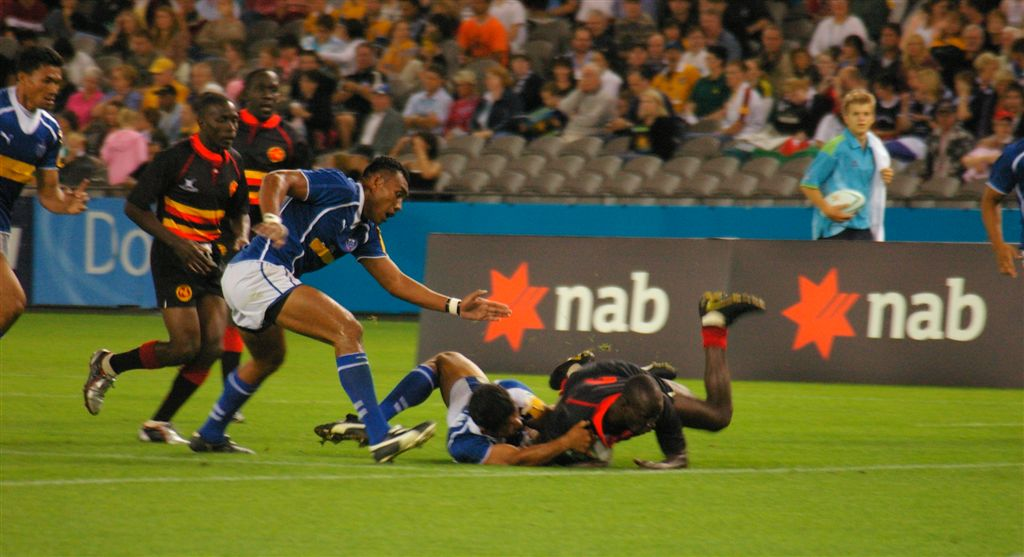
- The Uganda sevens team scores a try against Samoa
- Country: Uganda
- Governing body: Uganda Rugby Football Union
- National team: Uganda
- First played: Early 20th century
- Registered players: 26126
- Clubs: 17

National competitions
- Rugby World Cup; Rugby World Cup Sevens; IRB Sevens World Series

Club competitions
- Nile Special Premier League; Uganda Cup

Rugby union in Uganda has been played since colonial times when it was introduced by the British. The governing body is the Uganda Rugby Football Union.

== History ==
Rugby was originally introduced to Uganda by British colonists.

=== Idi Amin and rugby ===
A notable fan of all Ugandan sports, Former President Idi Amin was very athletic during his time in the army. At 193 cm (6 ft 4 in) tall, he was the Ugandan light heavyweight boxing champion from 1951 to 1960, and also a swimmer and rugby player. He played rugby initially with the Nile R.F.C. and later for the Kobs R.F.C. in Kampala. Amin also said in one of his speeches,

"As you know I am a rugby player. I am second row, so I know how to push. I am very big. You don't want to push against me. And I also play wing three-quarter and I am very fast. I can run one hundred meters in nine point five seconds (applause). If you tackle me, you will try, and you will hurt only yourself. So to everyone who is a boxer, I say this, do what you have to do to knock out your opponent."

Although on an official evaluation one of his officers once wrote of him:

"Idi Amin is a splendid type and a good [rugby] player, but virtually bone from the neck up, and needs things explained in words of one letter."

There is a frequently repeated urban legend that he was selected as a replacement by East Africa for their match against the 1955 British Lions. The story is entirely unfounded, he does not appear on the team photograph or on the official team list and replacements were not allowed in international rugby until 13 years after this event is supposed to have taken place.

=== 2010 Kampala attacks ===
In July, 2010, Ugandan rugby hit the headlines, when one of two locations hit by terrorist attacks was Kyadondo Rugby Club in Nakawa, where state-run newspaper New Vision was hosting a screening of the 2010 FIFA World Cup Final.

== National team ==
Uganda have been playing rugby since the late 1950s, playing their first international against Kenya in 1958. They have not yet qualified for the Rugby World Cup. Uganda plays in red.

Originally Uganda, along with Tanzania and Kenya was represented by the East Africa rugby union team. This consisted mostly of white settlers from Kenya, and the games tended to be hosted in Nairobi.

The British and Irish Lions played games against an East African side, on their 1955 tour, and 1962 tours (losing 50-0).

Uganda also has a women's team, and a rugby sevens team.

== Competitions ==
The main national competition of Uganda rugby is Nile Special Premier League, currently disputed by 10 teams. They are:

- Entebbe Plascon Mongers
- Stanbic Black Pirates
- Toyota Buffaloes
- Makerere Impis
- Heathens
- Rhinos
- Kobs
- Warriors
- Jinja Hippos
- Walukuba Barbarians
- Rams

The second most important competition is the Nile Special Uganda Cup. The current holders are the Kobs who defeated the Heathens 19-9 in the final, which took place at 30 October 2010.

== See also ==
- Uganda national rugby union team
- Uganda women's national rugby union team
- East Africa rugby union team
- Confederation of African Rugby
- Africa Cup
