= Rugby sevens at the 2014 Asian Games – Men's tournament =

Asian Games rugby

Men at the 2014 Asian Games
- Venue: Namdong Asiad Rugby Field
- Date: 30 September – 2 October 2014
- Competitors: 143 from 12 nations

Medalists
gold medal	Japan
silver medal	Hong Kong
bronze medal	South Korea

The 2014 Men's Asian Games Rugby sevens Tournament was held in Incheon Namdong Asiad Rugby Field, Incheon, South Korea from September 30 to October 2, 2014.

== Squads ==
China	Chinese Taipei	Hong Kong	Japan
Chen Kaiwen; Zhang Chao; Liu Guanjun; Feng Wenru; Liu Chao; Jiang Liwei; Li Yang; Chen Yongqiang; Lü Peng; Wang Jianhua; Liu Huachuan; Ma Chong	Chuang Po-yao; Chen Chih-chieh; Chen Kuo-lun; Lee Chia-wang; Pan Chih-hsiang; Ho Ming-hsien; Lu Chih-hao; Hsu Che-hsuan; Wang Chu-en; Huang Te-lung; Chen Chih-kang; Lin Chun-nan	Kwok Ka Chun; Jack Capon; Max Woodward; Michael Coverdale; Cado Lee; Keith Robertson; Alex McQueen; Mark Wright; Rowan Varty; Jamie Hood; Tom McQueen; Salom Yiu	Yusaku Kuwazuru; Shota Hagisawa; Michael Leitch; Lepuha Latuila; Makoto Kato; Masakatsu Hikosaka; Katsuyuki Sakai; Takashi Suzuki; Rakuhei Yamashita; Kazushi Hano; Lomano Lemeki; Masaki Watanabe
Lebanon	Malaysia	Pakistan	Philippines
Rudy Hachache; Ibrahim Ballout; Hassan Karaki; Robin Hachache; Joseph Touma; Jad Hashem; Karim Jammal; Walid Yassine; Raymond Asfour; Fredrick Makhlouf; Fadi Saad	Nazuridin Abd Latiff; Wan Izzuddin Ismail; Anwarrul Aswad Ahmad; Ameer Nasrun Zulkifli; Izwan Abu Bakar; Fairuz Rahman; Zulkifli Azmi; Faridzal Ismail; Anwarrul Hafiz Ahmad; Hanafi Zaini; Dinesvaran Krishnan; Danial Noor Hamidi	Sair Riaz; Nasir Mehmood; Muhammad Javed; Daud Gill; Khalid Mehmood; Umer Islam; Tahir Yaqub; Muhammad Tahir Rafi; Ahmed Wasim Akram; Ayub Zafar; Mian Hamza Hayauddin; Muhammad Basit	Andrew Wolff; Ben Saunders; Oliver Saunders; Kenneth Stern; Gareth Holgate; Jake Letts; Alex Aronson; Chris Hitch; Matt Saunders; Vincent Young; Harry Morris; Justin Coveney
Saudi Arabia	South Korea	Sri Lanka	Thailand
Fawaz Al-Fageeh; Waleed Yosef; Abdullah Al-Khaibari; Khalid Al-Hamdan; Hamzah Mogalled; Mohammed Al-Hawsawi; Hamzah Al-Khaibari; Mohammed Al-Karbi; Turki Al-Anazi; Adel Al-Shalawi; Faisal Mohammed; Mosab Barnawi	Han Kun-kyu; Yoon Tae-il; Kim Jeong-min; Yang Young-hun; Oh Youn-hyung; Kim Sung-soo; Kim Gwong-min; Kim Hyun-soo; Park Wan-yong; Kim Nam-uk; Jeong Yeon-sik; Lee Yong-seung	Gayan Weerarathna; Sudharshana Muthuthanthri; Anuruddha Wilwara; Lawanga Perera; Danushka Ranjan; Yoshitha Rajapaksa; Shehan Pathirana; Mithun Shamil; Srinath Sooriyabandara; Fazil Marija; Nigel Ratwatte; Dinusha Chathuranga	Sumet Thammaporn; Sirichai Daothaisong; Khomchak Chakrabandhu; Akarin Thitisakulvit; Apichai Phichaikamol; Pichit Yingcharoen; Thanawatr Jamkrajang; Topong Limphaiboon; Warongkorn Khamkoet; Parwaj Jarounapat; Nutanun Thanganun; Klin Laksanasompong

== Results ==
All times are Korea Standard Time (UTC+09:00)

=== Preliminary round ===
==== Pool A ====
Pos	Team	Pld	W	D	L	PF	PA	PD	Pts	Qualification
1	Japan	3	3	0	0	192	0	+192	9	Quarterfinals
2	Thailand	3	2	0	1	63	76	−13	7	Quarterfinals
3	Malaysia	3	1	0	2	65	74	−9	5	Classification 9th–12th
4	Saudi Arabia	3	0	0	3	5	175	−170	3	Classification 9th–12th

Source: Results

30 September
12:28

Japan	74–0	Saudi Arabia
Try: Watanabe (3) 1' m, 3' c, 7+' m Lemeki (2) 2' c, 7' c Latuila 5' m Yamashita 8' c Sakai (2) 9' c, 11' m Hikosaka 13' c Hagisawa 14' m Kato 14' c Con: Sakai (7/12)

Namdong Asiad Rugby Field, Incheon
Referee: Kim Yong-hoe (South Korea)

30 September
12:50

Malaysia	10–17	Thailand
Try: Azmi 4' m Abu Bakar 9' m Con: Rahman (0/2)		Try: Thanganun 1' m Limphaiboon 7+' m Thitisakulvit 14' c Con: Khamkoet (1/3)

Namdong Asiad Rugby Field, Incheon
Referee: Azhar Yusof (Singapore)

30 September
16:08

Japan	61–0	Thailand
Try: Lemeki (2) 2' c, 9' m Yamashita 4' c Kuwazuru 5' c Hano 7' c Suzuki 11' c Hikosaka 12' c Hagisawa 14' c Watanabe 14+' c Con: Sakai (7/8); Leitch (1/1)

Namdong Asiad Rugby Field, Incheon
Referee: Norman Drake (United Arab Emirates)

30 September
16:30

Malaysia	55–0	Saudi Arabia
Try: F. Ismail (3) 1' c, 4' c, 7+' c Abu Bakar 2' m Zulkifli 6' m A.A. Ahmad 8' m Zaini (3) 10' c, 13' c, 14' m Con: Rahman (5/9)

Namdong Asiad Rugby Field, Incheon
Referee: Taku Otsuki (Japan)

1 October
12:28

Japan	57–0	Malaysia
Try: Latuila 3' m Lemeki (2) 5' c, 9' c Yamashita 6' c Hano (2) 7' m, 14' c Hikosaka 8' m Suzuki 9' c Kato 12' c Con: Sakai (6/9)

Namdong Asiad Rugby Field, Incheon
Referee: Azhar Yusof (Singapore)

1 October
12:50

Thailand	46–5	Saudi Arabia
Try: Yingcharoen (2) 1' c, 11' m Khamkoet (2) 2' m, 7' m Jarounapat 7+' m Limphaiboon 8' m Thitisakulvit 9' c Daothaisong 14+' c Con: Khamkoet (1/4); Thitisakulvit (2/3); Jarounapat (0/1)		Try: Al-Hawsawi 5' m Con: Al-Fageeh (0/1)

Namdong Asiad Rugby Field, Incheon
Referee: Kim Yong-hoe (South Korea)

==== Pool B ====
Pos	Team	Pld	W	D	L	PF	PA	PD	Pts	Qualification
1	Hong Kong	3	3	0	0	131	5	+126	9	Quarterfinals
2	China	3	2	0	1	72	33	+39	7	Quarterfinals
3	Philippines	3	1	0	2	73	59	+14	5	Quarterfinals
4	Pakistan	3	0	0	3	0	179	−179	3	Classification 9th–12th

Source: Results

30 September
13:12

Hong Kong	72–0	Pakistan
Try: Coverdale (2) 1' m, 14+' m T. McQueen (2) 2' m, 4' m Varty (2) 5' m, 7+' m Woodward (2) 8' c, 10' c Yiu (3) 11' c, 12' c, 14' c Kwok 13' c Con: Hood (2/7); Robertson (4/5)

Namdong Asiad Rugby Field, Incheon
Referee: Shuhei Kubo (Japan)

30 September
13:34

China	19–14	Philippines
Try: Wang 5' c Ma (2) 10' c, 14+' m Con: Wang (1/2); Ma (1/1)		Try: Coveney 7+' c Wolff 8' c Con: Holgate (2/2)

Namdong Asiad Rugby Field, Incheon
Referee: Taku Otsuki (Japan)

30 September
16:52

Hong Kong	40–0	Philippines
Try: T. McQueen (2) 1' c, 7' c A. McQueen 4' c Woodward (3) 5' c, 8' c, 10' m Con: Hood (5/5); T. McQueen (0/1)

Namdong Asiad Rugby Field, Incheon
Referee: Azhar Yusof (Singapore)

30 September
17:14

China	48–0	Pakistan
Try: Zhang 2' m Chen K. (2) 5' m, 10' c Jiang (2) 9' c, 12' m Wang (2) 11' c, 14+' m Ma 14' c Con: Ma (2/3); Feng (0/1); Li (2/4)

Namdong Asiad Rugby Field, Incheon
Referee: Paul McKay (Singapore)

1 October
13:12

Hong Kong	19–5	China
Try: T. McQueen (2) 5' m, 12' c Coverdale 7' c Con: Hood (2/3)		Try: Liu H. 8' m Con: Wang (0/1)

Namdong Asiad Rugby Field, Incheon
Referee: Shuhei Kubo (Japan)

1 October
13:34

Philippines	59–0	Pakistan
Try: Holgate 2' c Letts 3' c Young 5' m Wolff (2) 5' c, 13' c B. Saunders 7' m Stern 11' c M. Saunders 12' c O. Saunders 14+' c Con: Holgate (5/7); Aronson (1/1); O. Saunders (1/1)

Namdong Asiad Rugby Field, Incheon
Referee: Taku Otsuki (Japan)

==== Pool C ====
Pos	Team	Pld	W	D	L	PF	PA	PD	Pts	Qualification
1	South Korea	3	3	0	0	94	31	+63	9	Quarterfinals
2	Sri Lanka	3	2	0	1	90	28	+62	7	Quarterfinals
3	Chinese Taipei	3	1	0	2	73	64	+9	5	Quarterfinals
4	Lebanon	3	0	0	3	12	146	−134	3	Classification 9th–12th

Source: Results

30 September
13:56

South Korea	38–7	Lebanon
Try: Han (2) 3' c, 6' c Kim J. 4' m Yoon 7' c Park 10' m Kim S. 14+' c Con: Oh (4/6)		Try: Saad 12' c Con: Hashem (1/1)

Namdong Asiad Rugby Field, Incheon
Referee: Timothy Baker (Hong Kong)

30 September
14:18

Sri Lanka	24–7	Chinese Taipei
Try: Pathirana 2' m Ranjan (2) 7+' m, 11' c Marija 9' c Con: Sooriyabandara (1/2); Marija (0/1); Shamil (1/1)		Try: Lee 14+' c Con: Lee (1/1)

Namdong Asiad Rugby Field, Incheon
Referee: Dewi Rowlands (Hong Kong)

30 September
17:36

South Korea	35–12	Chinese Taipei
Try: Han 1' c Kim J. (2) 3' c, 6' c Oh 7' c Kim G. 13' c Con: Oh (5/5)		Try: Ho 5' m Chuang 10' c Con: Pan (1/2)

Namdong Asiad Rugby Field, Incheon
Referee: Timothy Baker (Hong Kong)

30 September
17:58

Sri Lanka	54–0	Lebanon
Try: Sooriyabandara 2' c Chathuranga 3' c Shamil (2) 7+'c, 11' c Wilwara (3) 5' m, 9' c, 14' c Marija 11' c Con: Sooriyabandara (1/1); Marija (2/3); Shamil (2/2); Ratwatte (2/2)

Namdong Asiad Rugby Field, Incheon
Referee: Chris Linwood (United Arab Emirates)

1 October
13:56

South Korea	21–12	Sri Lanka
Try: Yang 9' c Jeong (2) 10'c, 12' c Con: Yang (2/2); Oh (1/1)		Try: Weerarathna 6' m Wilwara 7+' c Con: Marija (0/1); Shamil (1/1)

Namdong Asiad Rugby Field, Incheon
Referee: Timothy Baker (Hong Kong)

1 October
14:18

Chinese Taipei	54–5	Lebanon
Try: Lu (3) 1'c, 10' c, 14+' c Chen K. 4' m Wang 6' c Chen C.K. 9' c Lin 13' c Huang 14' c Con: Ho (5/5); Lee (0/1); Lin (2/2)		Try: Saad 11' m Con: Hashem (0/1)

Namdong Asiad Rugby Field, Incheon
Referee: Lee Wing Yi (Hong Kong)

==== Summary ====
Pos	Team	Pld	W	D	L	PF	PA	PD	Pts	Qualification
1	Japan	3	3	0	0	192	0	+192	9	Quarterfinals
2	Hong Kong	3	3	0	0	131	5	+126	9	Quarterfinals
3	South Korea	3	3	0	0	94	31	+63	9	Quarterfinals
4	Sri Lanka	3	2	0	1	90	28	+62	7	Quarterfinals
5	China	3	2	0	1	72	33	+39	7	Quarterfinals
6	Thailand	3	2	0	1	63	76	−13	7	Quarterfinals
7	Philippines	3	1	0	2	73	59	+14	5	Quarterfinals
8	Chinese Taipei	3	1	0	2	73	64	+9	5	Quarterfinals
9	Malaysia	3	1	0	2	65	74	−9	5	Classification 9th–12th
10	Lebanon	3	0	0	3	12	146	−134	3	Classification 9th–12th
11	Saudi Arabia	3	0	0	3	5	175	−170	3	Classification 9th–12th
12	Pakistan	3	0	0	3	0	179	−179	3	Classification 9th–12th

Source: Results

=== Classification 9th–12th ===
Classification 9th–12th
1 October
Malaysia	36
Pakistan	0
1 October
Lebanon	22
Saudi Arabia	7

Classification 9th–10th
2 October
Malaysia	35
Lebanon	5
Classification 11th–12th
2 October
Pakistan	12
Saudi Arabia	7

==== Semifinals ====
1 October
16:34

Malaysia	36–0	Pakistan
Try: A.H. Ahmad (2) 4' c, 8' c Rahman 7+' c Azmi 10' m Hamidi 14' m Abu Bakar 14+' m Con: Rahman (3/4); Zulkifli (0/1); Azmi (0/1)

Namdong Asiad Rugby Field, Incheon
Referee: Taku Otsuki (Japan)

1 October
16:56

Lebanon	22–7	Saudi Arabia
Try: Hashem 6' m Touma (2) 7+' c, 10' m Yassine 8' m Con: Jammal (1/3); Hashem (0/1)		Try: Barnawi 14+' c Con: Al-Fageeh (1/1)

Namdong Asiad Rugby Field, Incheon
Referee: Shuhei Kubo (Japan)

==== Classification 11th–12th ====
2 October
14:06

Pakistan	12–7	Saudi Arabia
Try: Riaz 4' c Yaqub 14+' m Con: Hayauddin (1/2)		Try: Barnawi 8' c Con: Al-Fageeh (1/1)

Namdong Asiad Rugby Field, Incheon
Referee: Wu Zhihong (China)

==== Classification 9th–10th ====
2 October
14:28

Malaysia	35–5	Lebanon
Try: W. Ismail 1' c Zulkifli 4' c A.H. Ahmad 10' c Azmi 12' c Rahman 14' c Con: Rahman (5/5)		Try: Touma 7' m Con: Jammal (0/1)

Namdong Asiad Rugby Field, Incheon
Referee: Norman Drake (United Arab Emirates)

=== Final round ===
Quarterfinals
1 October
Hong Kong	21
Philippines	0
1 October
South Korea	31
Thailand	12
1 October
Sri Lanka (aet)	24
China	19
1 October
Japan	57
Chinese Taipei	0

Semifinals
2 October
Hong Kong	15
South Korea	7
2 October
Sri Lanka	0
Japan	40

Gold medal match
2 October
Hong Kong	12
Japan	24
Bronze medal match
2 October
South Korea	17
Sri Lanka	14

Classification 5th–8th
2 October
Philippines	45
Thailand	0
2 October
China	22
Chinese Taipei	7

Classification 5th–6th
2 October
Philippines	28
China	21
Classification 7th–8th
2 October
Thailand	12
Chinese Taipei	10

==== Quarterfinals ====
1 October
17:18

Hong Kong	21–0	Philippines
Try: A. McQueen 4' c T. McQueen (2) 7+' c, 9' c Con: Hood (3/3)

Namdong Asiad Rugby Field, Incheon
Referee: Paul McKay (Singapore)

1 October
17:40

South Korea	31–12	Thailand
Try: Kim J. 5' c Kim G. 7' c Yang 8' m Han 13' c Kim N. 14+' m Con: Yang (2/3); Oh (1/2)		Try: Yingcharoen 1' m Thammaporn 9' c Con: Khamkoet (1/2)

Namdong Asiad Rugby Field, Incheon
Referee: Dewi Rowlands (Hong Kong)

1 October
18:02

Sri Lanka	24–19 (a.e.t.)	China
Try: Pathirana 1' c Wilwara 7+' m Marija 10' c Shamil 16' m Con: Marija (1/2); Shamil (1/1)		Try: Liu G. 3' c Ma 5' c Feng 13' m Con: Wang (2/3)

Namdong Asiad Rugby Field, Incheon
Referee: Timothy Baker (Hong Kong)

1 October
18:24

Japan	57–0	Chinese Taipei
Try: Kuwazuru 2' c Sakai 3' c Hano (2) 4' c, 6' c Hikosaka 7+' m Kato 9' c Lemeki 10' m Hagisawa 13' c Latuila 14+' m Con: Sakai (4/5); Kato (1/1); Lemeki (0/1); Leitch (1/2)

Namdong Asiad Rugby Field, Incheon
Referee: Norman Drake (United Arab Emirates)

==== Semifinals 5th–8th ====
2 October
14:50

Philippines	45–0	Thailand
Try: Holgate 2' m Wolff (3) 4' c, 9' m, 12' c Young 6' c O. Saunders 13' c M. Saunders 14' c Con: Holgate (3/5); O. Saunders (2/2)

Namdong Asiad Rugby Field, Incheon
Referee: Taku Otsuki (Japan)

2 October
15:12

China	22–7	Chinese Taipei
Try: Ma (2) 7+' m, 8' c Lü 10' m Liu G. 11' m Con: Wang (1/4)		Try: Chen C.K. 14+' c Con: Chen C.K. (1/1)

Namdong Asiad Rugby Field, Incheon
Referee: Dewi Rowlands (Hong Kong)

==== Semifinals ====
2 October
16:18

Hong Kong	15–7	South Korea
Try: Varty 5' m T. McQueen 9' m Hood 14' m Con: Hood (0/3)		Try: Jeong 7+' c Con: Oh (1/1)

Namdong Asiad Rugby Field, Incheon
Referee: Shuhei Kubo (Japan)

2 October
16:40

Sri Lanka	0–40	Japan
		Try: Hano (2) 1' m, 9' c Lemeki (3) 3' c, 4' c, 11' c Latuila 7' c Con: Sakai (5/6)

Namdong Asiad Rugby Field, Incheon
Referee: Timothy Baker (Hong Kong)

==== Classification 7th–8th ====
2 October
17:46

Thailand	12–10	Chinese Taipei
Try: Yingcharoen 4' c Khamkoet 7' m Con: Khamkoet (1/2)		Try: Lu (2) 8' m, 11' m Con: Ho (0/2)

Namdong Asiad Rugby Field, Incheon
Referee: Norman Drake (United Arab Emirates)

==== Classification 5th–6th ====
2 October
18:08

Philippines	28–21	China
Try: B. Saunders 2' c Holgate 7+' c M. Saunders (2) 10' c, 12' c Con: Holgate (4/4)		Try: Chen K. 4' c Jiang 6' c Ma 14' c Con: Feng (1/1); Wang (1/1); Ma (1/1)

Namdong Asiad Rugby Field, Incheon
Referee: Azhar Yusof (Singapore)

==== Bronze medal match ====
2 October
18:52

South Korea	17–14	Sri Lanka
Try: Jeong 4' c Kim J. 8' m Kim G. 12' m Con: Oh (1/3)		Try: Weerarathna 3' c Sooriyabandara 11' c Con: Marija (1/1); Sooriyabandara (1/1)

Namdong Asiad Rugby Field, Incheon
Referee: Timothy Baker (Hong Kong)

==== Gold medal match ====
2 October
19:44

Hong Kong	12–24	Japan
Try: Varty 3' m Yiu 14' c Con: Hood (1/2)		Try: Leitch 6' m Penalty try 7+' c Lemeki 18' c Hano 20' m Con: Sakai (2/4)

Namdong Asiad Rugby Field, Incheon
Referee: Paul McKay (Singapore)

== Final standing ==
Rank	Team	Pld	W	D	L
1st place, gold medalist(s)	Japan	6	6	0	0
2nd place, silver medalist(s)	Hong Kong	6	5	0	1
3rd place, bronze medalist(s)	South Korea	6	5	0	1
4	Sri Lanka	6	3	0	3
5	Philippines	6	3	0	3
6	China	6	3	0	3
7	Thailand	6	3	0	3
8	Chinese Taipei	6	1	0	5
9	Malaysia	5	3	0	2
10	Lebanon	5	1	0	4
11	Pakistan	5	1	0	4
12	Saudi Arabia	5	0	0	5
