= 2014 Asian Five Nations =

- Date: 26 April – 25 May 2014
- Countries: Hong Kong; Japan; Philippines; South Korea; Sri Lanka

Final positions
- Champions: Japan (22nd title)

Tournament statistics
- Matches played: 10
- Website: www.asian5nations.com

The 2014 Asian Five Nations, known as the 2014 HSBC Asian 5 Nations due to the tournament's sponsorship by the HSBC, was the 7th and final series of the Asian Five Nations rugby union tournament, before it shrinks to only include the top 3 Asian teams from 2015.

Japan, as victors, qualified for the 2015 Rugby World Cup as Asia 1 in Pool B, while the runner up, Hong Kong, qualified for the repechage playoffs, against Uruguay. In additional qualifications, only the top three teams would play in the leading tier in 2015, after the ARFU reduced the top tier from five, to three.

== Changes from 2013 ==
- United Arab Emirates has been replaced with Sri Lanka, who earns promotion from Division 1.

== Teams ==
The teams involved are:

Nation	Home stadium	City	Head coach	Captain
Hong Kong (26)	Hong Kong Football Club Stadium	Hong Kong	(Wales) Leigh Jones	Pale Tauti
Japan (13)	Mizuho Rugby Stadium; National Olympic Stadium	Nagoya; Tokyo	(Australia) Eddie Jones	Toshiaki Hirose
South Korea (23)	Incheon Munhak Stadium	Incheon	(South Korea) Kim Myung Joo	
Philippines (57)	Eagles Nest Stadium	Laguna	(Australia) Jarred Hodges	
Sri Lanka (39)	Colombo Racecourse	Colombo	(Sri Lanka) Johan Taylor	Fazil Marija

== Final Table ==
2014 Asian Five Nations Champion
Relegated to Division One

Position	Nation	Games				Points			Bonus points	Total points
Position	Nation	Played	Won	Drawn	Lost	For	Against	Difference	Bonus points	Total points
1	Japan	4	4	0	0	342	33	+309	4	24
2	Hong Kong	4	3	0	1	196	65	+131	3	18
3	South Korea	4	2	0	2	122	126	-4	2	12
4	Philippines	4	1	0	3	58	274	–216	1	6
5	Sri Lanka	4	0	0	4	48	258	–210	1	1

Points are awarded to the teams as follows:

Results	Points
Win	5 points
Draw	3 points
4 or more tries	1 point
Loss within 7 points	1 point
Loss greater than 7 points	0 points

== Fixtures ==
=== Round 1 ===
26 April 2014
12:00 KST (UTC+09)

South Korea	59–3	Sri Lanka
Try: Jung Pil 2' m Jeong Min (2) 6' c, 25' m Eudum 17' m Jong Yeul 39' m Kwang Moon 53' c Young Gi 59' c Hyun Soo 67' m Byeong Ho 78' c Con: Eudum (2/6) 7', 54'; Won Yong (2/3) 60', 79'; Pen: Won Yong (2/2) 32', 64'	Report	Pen: Riza Mubarak (1/2) 27'

Incheon Munhak Stadium, Incheon
Referee: Taku Otsuki (Japan)

26 April 2014
18:00 HKT (UTC+08)

Hong Kong	108–0	Philippines
Try: Wei 2' m Kam Shing 8' c Brant 14' m Lamming (3) 31' c, 49' c, 68' c Phelps 35'; Hsieh 38' c Jones 40' c McColl (2) 42' c, 80' c Varty 55' c Mcqueen 59' m McKee 64' m Wheatley 72' c Baddeley 78' m Con: McAdam (11/16) 9', 32', 36', 39', 40', 43', 50', 55', 69', 73', 80'; Pen: McAdam (2/3) 10', 26'	Report

Hong Kong Football Club Stadium, Hong Kong
Referee: Shuhei Kubo (Japan)

FB	15	Alex Mcqueen
RW	14	Rowan Varty
OC	13	Jake Phelps
IC	12	Lloyd Jones
LW	11	Yiu Kam Shing
FH	10	Chris McAdam
SH	9	Kenneth Hsieh
N8	8	Pale Tauti (c)
OF	7	Matt Lamming
BF	6	Alex Baddeley
RL	5	Paul Dwyer
LL	4	Bill Brant
TP	3	Stephen Nolan
HK	2	Alex Harris (c)
LP	1	Leon Wei
Replacements:
HK	16	Thomas Bolland
PR	17	James Cooper
PR	18	Alex Ng
LK	19	Terence Montgomery
FL	20	Nick Hewson
SH	21	Pete Mckee
FH	22	Nick Wheatley
CE	23	Tom McColl
Coach:
(Wales) Leigh Jones

FB	15	Alexander Aronson
RW	14	Gareth Holgate
OC	13	Justin Coveney
IC	12	Matthew Saunders
LW	11	Kenneth Stern
FH	10	Oliver Saunders (c)
SH	9	Jake Letts
N8	8	Samuel Bennetts
OF	7	Darran Seeto
BF	6	Christopher Anderson
RL	5	Ashley Heward
LL	4	Stephen Howorth
TP	3	Philip Sinclair
HK	2	Austin Dacanay
LP	1	David Robinson-Polkey
Replacements:
HK	16	Glenn Power
PR	17	Daniel Melrose
PR	18	Fergus Mitra
FL	19	Nathan Welch
FL	20	Timothy Kong
SH	21	Cleo Gomez
FH	22	Fritz Moschitz
WG	23	Rupert Zappia
Coach:
(Australia) Jarred Hodges

Touch judges:
Paul McKay (Singapore)
Macro Wu Wu Zhihong (China)

=== Round 2 ===
3 May 2014
15:30 PST (UTC+08)

Philippines	10–99	Japan
	Report

Eagles Nest Stadium, Laguna
Referee: Dewi Rowlands (Hong Kong)

3 May 2014
18:30 SLT (UTC+05:30)

Sri Lanka	10–41	Hong Kong
	Report

Colombo Racecourse Sports Complex, Colombo
Referee: Azhar Mohammad Bin Yus (Singapore)

=== Round 3 ===
10 May 2014
18:00 JST (UTC+09)

Japan	132–10	Sri Lanka
	IRB

Mizuho Rugby Stadium, Nagoya

10 May 2014
18:00 HKT (UTC+08)

Hong Kong	39–6	South Korea
	IRB

Hong Kong Football Club Stadium, Hong Kong

=== Round 4 ===
17 May 2014
12:00 KST (UTC+09)

South Korea	5–62	Japan

Incheon Munhak Stadium, Incheon

17 May 2014
18:30 SLT (UTC+05:30)

Sri Lanka	25–26	Philippines

Colombo Racecourse Sports Complex, Colombo

=== Round 5 ===
24 May 2014
15:30 PST (UTC+08)

Philippines	22–52	South Korea

Eagles Nest Stadium, Laguna

25 May 2014
17:00 JST (UTC+09)

Japan	49–8	Hong Kong

National Olympic Stadium, Tokyo

== Media coverage ==
The tournament is broadcast live in many different countries.
