= Rugby sevens at the 2010 Asian Games =

- Venue: Guangzhou University Town Stadium
- Dates: 21–23 November 2010
- Competitors: 201 from 11 nations

Rugby sevens was one of the 42 sports at the 16th Asian Games 2010 at Guangzhou, China. It was held at the Guangzhou University Town Stadium.

== Schedule ==
P	Preliminary round	¼	Quarterfinals	½	Semifinals	F	Finals

Event↓/Date →	21st Sun	22nd Mon	23rd Tue		
Men	P	P	¼	½	F
Women	P	P	¼	½	F

== Medalists ==
Event	Gold	Silver	Bronze
Men	Japan; Koji Wada; Yasunori Nagatomo; Masahiro Tsuiki; Kotaro Watanabe; Yuta Imamura; Shuetsu Narita; Hiraku Tomoigawa; Takehisa Usuzuki; Tomohiro Semba; Kenji Shomen; Takayuki Yamauchi; Tomoki Kitagawa	Hong Kong; Simon Leung; Kwok Ka Chun; Mark Wright; Anthony Haynes; Tsang Hing Hung; Jamie Hood; Fan Shun Kei; Edward Haynes; Rowan Varty; Keith Robertson; Sebastian Perkins; Salom Yiu	South Korea; Youn Kwon-woo; Yoon Tae-il; Han Kun-kyu; Park Wan-yong; Kim Won-yong; Jegal Bin; Chun Jong-man; Kim Hyun-soo; Lee Jung-min; Park Chang-min; Kwak Chul-woong; Yun Hi-su
Women	Kazakhstan; Olga Kumanikina; Irina Radzivil; Amina Baratova; Olessya Teryayeva; Olga Sazonova; Nigora Nurmatova; Marianna Balashova; Anna Yakovleva; Svetlana Klyuchnikova; Lyudmila Sherer; Irina Amossova; Irina Adler	China; Bai Ying; Guan Qishi; Sun Tingting; Fan Wenjuan; Gao Yan; Liu Yan; Zhao Xinqi; Wang Qianli; Liu Tingting; Pei Jiawen; Sun Shichao; Wang Yue	Thailand; Naritsara Worakitsirikun; Prima Jusom; Tidarat Sawatnam; Aoychai Tummawat; Rungrat Maineiwklang; Piyamat Chomphumee; Chitchanok Yusri; Rasamee Sisongkham; Uthumporn Liamrat; Butsaya Bunrak; Phanthippha Wongwangchan; Jeeraporn Peerabunanon

== Medal table ==
Rank	Nation	Gold	Silver	Bronze	Total
1	Japan (JPN)	1	0	0	1
1	Kazakhstan (KAZ)	1	0	0	1
3	China (CHN)	0	1	0	1
3	Hong Kong (HKG)	0	1	0	1
5	South Korea (KOR)	0	0	1	1
5	Thailand (THA)	0	0	1	1
Totals (6 entries)		2	2	2	6

== Draw ==
The draw ceremony for the team sports was held on 7 October 2010 at Guangzhou.

=== Men ===
The teams were seeded according to their position at the 2006 Asian Games.

Pool A

- Japan (1)
- Hong Kong (5)
- Thailand (7)
- Malaysia
- Mongolia

Pool B

- South Korea (2)
- China (3)
- Sri Lanka (6)
- India (8)

=== Women ===
The teams were seeded based on their final ranking at the 2010 Asian Women's Sevens Championship.

Pool A

- China (1)
- Thailand (3)
- Hong Kong (5)
- ~~Uzbekistan (8)~~*
- South Korea (13)

Pool B

- Kazakhstan (2)
- Japan (4)
- Singapore (6)
- India (11)

* Withdrew.

== Final standing ==
=== Men ===
Rank	Team	Pld	W	D	L
1st place, gold medalist(s)	Japan	7	7	0	0
2nd place, silver medalist(s)	Hong Kong	7	5	0	2
3rd place, bronze medalist(s)	South Korea	6	4	0	2
4	China	6	4	0	2
5	Malaysia	7	4	0	3
6	Sri Lanka	6	2	0	4
7	India	6	1	0	5
8	Thailand	7	1	0	6
9	Mongolia	4	0	0	4

=== Women ===
Rank	Team	Pld	W	D	L
1st place, gold medalist(s)	Kazakhstan	6	6	0	0
2nd place, silver medalist(s)	China	6	5	0	1
3rd place, bronze medalist(s)	Thailand	6	4	0	2
4	Hong Kong	6	2	0	4
5	Japan	6	4	0	2
6	Singapore	6	2	0	4
7	India	6	1	0	5
8	South Korea	6	0	0	6
