= Rugby sevens at the 2010 Asian Games – Men's tournament =

Men at the 2010 Asian Games
- Venue: Guangzhou University Town Stadium
- Date: 21–23 November 2010
- Competitors: 105 from 9 nations

Medalists
gold medal	Japan
silver medal	Hong Kong
bronze medal	South Korea

The 2010 Men's Asian Games Rugby sevens Tournament was held in Guangzhou University Town Stadium, Guangzhou, China from November 21 to November 23, 2010.

== Squads ==
China	Hong Kong	India	Japan
He Zhongliang; Wang Jiacheng; Sun Tao; Li Jialin; Zhang Zhiqiang; Lu Zhuan; Li Yang; Chen Xuesen; Xu Hui; Jin Ye; Gu Shuo; Liu Guanjun	Simon Leung; Kwok Ka Chun; Mark Wright; Anthony Haynes; Tsang Hing Hung; Jamie Hood; Fan Shun Kei; Edward Haynes; Rowan Varty; Keith Robertson; Sebastian Perkins; Salom Yiu	Amit Lochab; Puneet Krishnamurthy; Surinder Singh; Hrishikesh Pendse; Bikash Jena; Nasser Hussain; Rohaan Sethna; Thimmaiah Madanda; Gautam Dagar; Pritom Roy; Deepak Dagar; Kayrus Unwala	Koji Wada; Yasunori Nagatomo; Masahiro Tsuiki; Kotaro Watanabe; Yuta Imamura; Shuetsu Narita; Hiraku Tomoigawa; Takehisa Usuzuki; Tomohiro Semba; Kenji Shomen; Takayuki Yamauchi; Tomoki Kitagawa
Malaysia	Mongolia	South Korea	Sri Lanka
Dinesvaran Krishnan; Anwarrul Aswad Ahmad; Hafeez Faesal; Mohd Taufiq Mohd Noor; Syahir Asraf Rosli; Nik Safuan Ismade; Zulkifli Azmi; Khairul Azhar; Nazreen Fitri Nasrudin; Saizul Hafifi; Saizul Hafiz	Odsürengiin Gantulga; Ganboldyn Khosbayar; Narantsatsralyn Batmandal; Nergüin Khüchit; Batboldyn Zolboo; Lkhagvatserengiin Zagdsüren; Tsegmediin Delgerkhüü; Enkhbatyn Gansaikhan; Batmönkhiin Pürevbat; Gantömöriin Javkhlanbayar	Youn Kwon-woo; Yoon Tae-il; Han Kun-kyu; Park Wan-yong; Kim Won-yong; Jegal Bin; Chun Jong-man; Kim Hyun-soo; Lee Jung-min; Park Chang-min; Kwak Chul-woong; Yun Hi-su	Radhika Hettiarachchi; Charith Seneviratne; Sajith Saranga; Dilan de Zoysa; Srinath Sooriyabandara; Chanaka Chandimal; Vishwamitra Jayasinghe; Saliya Handapangoda; Mohamed Sheriff; Anuruddha Wilwara; Shenal Dias; Bilal Hassen
Thailand			
Pichit Yingcharoen; Tanyavit Kuasint; Weera Musemsadao; Korrapong Wongsalangkarn; Chaisak Piromkraipak; Warongkorn Khamkoet; Pannapat Pooltharat; Sarayuth Thiengtrong; Somsak Mitlux; Parwaj Jarounapat; Krittakon Rotthuk; Suwat Mapijan			

== Results ==
All times are China Standard Time (UTC+08:00)

=== Preliminary round ===
==== Pool A ====
Pos	Team	Pld	W	D	L	PF	PA	PD	Pts	Qualification
1	Japan	4	4	0	0	136	12	+124	12	Quarterfinals
2	Hong Kong	4	3	0	1	128	39	+89	10	Quarterfinals
3	Malaysia	4	2	0	2	68	76	−8	8	Quarterfinals
4	Thailand	4	1	0	3	76	86	−10	6	Quarterfinals
5	Mongolia	4	0	0	4	0	195	−195	4	

Source: Results

21 November
15:21

Japan	55–0	Mongolia
Try: Wada (2) 2' m, 3' c Nagatomo 5' m Shomen 7' m Semba 8' c Kitagawa (3) 11' m, 14' c, 14+' c Tomoigawa 13' c Con: Shomen (5/9)

University Town Stadium, Guangzhou
Referee: Alan Whitcombe (Great Britain)

21 November
15:44

Hong Kong	38–10	Malaysia
Try: E. Haynes (2) 2' c, 11' c Varty (2) 4' c, 8' c Yiu (2) 13' m, 14' m Con: Robertson (4/5); Tsang (0/1)		Try: Hafiz 7+' m Azmi 14+' m Con: Hafiz (0/1); Azmi (0/1)

University Town Stadium, Guangzhou
Referee: Scott Herbert (New Zealand)

21 November
17:49

Thailand	52–0	Mongolia
Try: Jarounapat 1' m Khamkoet 2' c Kuasint (2) 4' c, 7' m Yingcharoen (2) 7' c, 13' c Rotthuk (2) 12' c, 14+' c Con: Mitlux (0/1); Jarounapat (6/7)

University Town Stadium, Guangzhou
Referee: Tobi Lothian (Hong Kong)

22 November
9:00

Japan	24–0	Malaysia
Try: Usuzuki 2' m Narita (2) 6' c, 8' c Kitagawa 14' m Con: Shomen (2/3); Narita (0/1)

University Town Stadium, Guangzhou
Referee: Harry Mason (Singapore)

22 November
9:23

Hong Kong	24–5	Thailand
Try: Robertson 4' m Wright (2) 7' c, 7+' m Yiu 13' c Con: Varty (0/1); Robertson (2/3)		Try: Yingcharoen 2' m Con: Jarounapat (0/1)

University Town Stadium, Guangzhou
Referee: Taizo Hirabayashi (Japan)

22 November
11:00

Malaysia	29–0	Mongolia
Try: Hafiz 1' c Azhar 5' c Ahmad 7' m Dinesvaran 8' m Azmi 10' m Con: Nasrudin (2/5)

University Town Stadium, Guangzhou
Referee: Chou Wen-liang (Chinese Taipei)

22 November
12:37

Japan	33–5	Thailand
Try: Shomen 2' c Tomoigawa 3' c Wada 5' m Yamauchi 9' c Nagatomo 13' c Con: Shomen (2/3); Yamauchi (1/1); Nagatomo (1/1)		Try: Yingcharoen 8' m Con: Jarounapat (0/1)

University Town Stadium, Guangzhou
Referee: Scott Herbert (New Zealand)

22 November
13:00

Hong Kong	59–0	Mongolia
Try: A. Haynes 1' c Perkins 3' c Robertson 4' c Leung 5' c Varty (2) 7' c, 8' c E. Haynes 7+' m Yiu (2) 10' c, 13' m Con: Robertson (3/3); E. Haynes (3/5); Tsang (1/1)

University Town Stadium, Guangzhou
Referee: Liu Hao (China)

22 November
15:46

Thailand	14–29	Malaysia
Try: Jarounapat 4' c Musemsadao 7' c Con: Jarounapat (2/2)		Try: Ismade 1' c Hafiz 5' m Hafifi 10' m Rosli 14' c Azhar 14+' m Con: Nasrudin (1/2); Ismade (0/1); Rosli (1/1); Azhar (0/1)

University Town Stadium, Guangzhou
Referee: Alan Whitcombe (Great Britain)

22 November
16:09

Japan	24–7	Hong Kong
Try: Imamura (2) 2' m, 10' m Wada 7+' c Tsuiki 9' c Con: Shomen (2/4)		Try: Robertson 12' c Con: Robertson (1/1)

University Town Stadium, Guangzhou
Referee: Azhar Yusof (Singapore)

==== Pool B ====
Pos	Team	Pld	W	D	L	PF	PA	PD	Pts	Qualification
1	China	3	3	0	0	99	10	+89	9	Quarterfinals
2	South Korea	3	2	0	1	91	17	+74	7	Quarterfinals
3	Sri Lanka	3	1	0	2	47	81	−34	5	Quarterfinals
4	India	3	0	0	3	17	146	−129	3	Quarterfinals

Source: Results

21 November
17:03

South Korea	43–5	India
Try: Kim W. (2) 1' c, 6' m Kim H. (2) 7+' m, 9' c Chun 11' c Kwak 13' m Park W. 14+' c Con: Kim W. (3/5); Chun (1/1)		Try: Hussain 4' m Con: Sethna (0/1)

University Town Stadium, Guangzhou
Referee: Liu Hao (China)

21 November
17:26

China	26–5	Sri Lanka
Try: Sun 2' c Li Y. 8' c He 10' m Chen 13' c Con: Zhang (2/3); Jin (1/1)		Try: Jayasinghe 6' m Con: Sooriyabandara (0/1)

University Town Stadium, Guangzhou
Referee: Azhar Yusof (Singapore)

22 November
10:37

South Korea	43–0	Sri Lanka
Try: Kwak 1' c Kim W. (2) 5' m, 9' m Youn 7' c Kim H. 7+' c Park W. 10' m Han 12' c Con: Kim W. (3/4); Yun (1/3)

University Town Stadium, Guangzhou
Referee: Akihisa Aso (Japan)

22 November
11:23

China	61–0	India
Try: Zhang 1' c Li Y. (2) 3' c, 5' c Lu (4) 6' c, 8' c, 10' c, 14+' c Li J. 7+' c Sun 13' m Con: Zhang (2/2); Li Y. (1/1); Lu (4/4); Jin (1/1); Sun (0/1)

University Town Stadium, Guangzhou
Referee: Gabriel Lee (Hong Kong)

22 November
14:09

Sri Lanka	42–12	India
Try: Wilwara (2) 2' c, 3' c Sooriyabandara (2) 6' c, 10' c Handapangoda 9' c Dias 12' c Con: Hettiarachchi (4/4); Handapangoda (1/1); Sooriyabandara (1/1)		Try: Pendse 7' m G. Dagar 7+' c Con: Sethna (1/2)

University Town Stadium, Guangzhou
Referee: Harry Mason (Singapore)

22 November
14:32

South Korea	5–12	China
Try: Kwak 7+' m Con: Kim W. (0/1)		Try: Lu 11' c Jin 13' m Con: Li Y. (1/1)

University Town Stadium, Guangzhou
Referee: Taizo Hirabayashi (Japan)

=== Final round ===
Quarterfinals
23 November
Japan	26
India	5
23 November
South Korea	47
Malaysia	7
23 November
China	36
Thailand	0
23 November
Hong Kong	19
Sri Lanka	14

Semifinals
23 November
Japan	28
South Korea	15
23 November
China	14
Hong Kong (aet)	19

Gold medal match
23 November
Japan	28
Hong Kong	21
Bronze medal match
23 November
South Korea	21
China	14

5–8 placing
23 November
India	5
Malaysia	38
23 November
Thailand	17
Sri Lanka	21

5th/6th placing
23 November
Malaysia	27
Sri Lanka	7
7th/8th placing
23 November
India	22
Thailand	7

==== Quarterfinals ====
23 November
10:37

Japan	26–5	India
Try: Kitagawa 3' m Imamura (2) 10' c, 12' c Narita 14+' c Con: Nagatomo (0/1); Kitagawa (3/3)		Try: Pendse 7+' m Con: Sethna (0/1)

University Town Stadium, Guangzhou
Referee: Harry Mason (Singapore)

23 November
11:00

South Korea	47–7	Malaysia
Try: Kwak 2' c Jegal 3' m Park W. (2) 6' c, 8' c Lee 7+' c Kim H. 10' c Chun 11' c Con: Kim W. (6/7)		Try: Azhar 5' c Con: Nasrudin (1/1)

University Town Stadium, Guangzhou
Referee: Taizo Hirabayashi (Japan)

23 November
11:23

China	36–0	Thailand
Try: Xu 2' c Jin 4' c He 6' m Li Y. (2) 7' m, 8' m Li J. 14' c Con: Li Y. (1/3); Jin (1/1); Lu (0/1); Xu (1/1)

University Town Stadium, Guangzhou
Referee: Alan Whitcombe (Great Britain)

23 November
11:46

Hong Kong	19–14	Sri Lanka
Try: A. Haynes (2) 5' m, 11' c Wright 6' c Con: Robertson (2/3)		Try: Handapangoda (2) 4' c, 9' c Con: Hettiarachchi (2/2)

University Town Stadium, Guangzhou
Referee: Scott Herbert (New Zealand)

==== 5–8 placing ====
23 November
13:46

India	5–38	Malaysia
Try: G. Dagar 14' m Con: Sethna (0/1)		Try: Dinesvaran 4' c Azhar 7' c Nasrudin (2) 7+' c, 14+' m Hafifi 9' c Hafiz 11' m Con: Nasrudin (4/5); Rosli (0/1)

University Town Stadium, Guangzhou
Referee: Azhar Yusof (Singapore)

23 November
14:09

Thailand	17–21	Sri Lanka
Try: Khamkoet 7+' m Mitlux 12' c Wongsalangkarn 13' m Con: Jarounapat (0/1); Khamkoet (1/2)		Try: Hettiarachchi 3' c Wilwara 5' c Jayasinghe 8' c Con: Hettiarachchi (3/3)

University Town Stadium, Guangzhou
Referee: Gabriel Lee (Hong Kong)

==== Semifinals ====
23 November
14:32

Japan	28–15	South Korea
Try: Wada (2) 2' c, 14' c Tsuiki (2) 6' c, 9' c Con: Shomen (4/4)		Try: Youn 7+' m Kim W. 11' m Kim H. 11' m Con: Kim W. (0/3)

University Town Stadium, Guangzhou
Referee: Scott Herbert (New Zealand)

23 November
14:55

China	14–19 (a.e.t.)	Hong Kong
Try: Zhang 4' c Lu 11' c Con: Lu (1/1); Zhang (1/1)		Try: Varty 2' c A. Haynes (2) 7+' c, 15' m Con: Robertson (2/2)

University Town Stadium, Guangzhou
Referee: Taizo Hirabayashi (Japan)

==== 7th/8th placing ====
23 November
16:09

India	22–7	Thailand
Try: G. Dagar 4' m Unwala (2) 7+' c, 14' m Hussain 10' m Con: Sethna (1/4)		Try: Wongsalangkarn 6' c Con: Khamkoet (1/1)

University Town Stadium, Guangzhou
Referee: Akihisa Aso (Japan)

==== 5th/6th placing ====
23 November
16:32

Malaysia	27–7	Sri Lanka
Try: Dinesvaran (3) 5' m, 8' m, 13' m Hafifi 10' m Hafiz 14' c Con: Nasrudin (1/5)		Try: Wilwara 7+' c Con: Hettiarachchi (1/1)

University Town Stadium, Guangzhou
Referee: Tobi Lothian (Hong Kong)

==== Bronze medal match ====
23 November
17:18

South Korea	21–14	China
Try: Park W. 2' c Chun 9' c Kim H. 14+' c Con: Chun (2/2); Kim W. (1/1)		Try: Li Y. 5' c Jin 7+' c Con: Zhang (2/2)

University Town Stadium, Guangzhou
Referee: Harry Mason (Singapore)

==== Gold medal match ====
23 November
18:18

Japan	28–21	Hong Kong
Try: Tsuiki 4' c Wada (2) 5' c, 10' c Nagatomo 18' c Con: Shomen (4/4)		Try: Varty 9' c Robertson 12' c Yiu 15' c Con: Robertson (3/3)

University Town Stadium, Guangzhou
Referee: Alan Whitcombe (Great Britain)

== Final standing ==
Rank	Team	Pld	W	D	L
1st place, gold medalist(s)	Japan	7	7	0	0
2nd place, silver medalist(s)	Hong Kong	7	5	0	2
3rd place, bronze medalist(s)	South Korea	6	4	0	2
4	China	6	4	0	2
5	Malaysia	7	4	0	3
6	Sri Lanka	6	2	0	4
7	India	6	1	0	5
8	Thailand	7	1	0	6
9	Mongolia	4	0	0	4
