= Atef Hamdan =

Lebanon rugby league and rugby union footballer

Personal information
- Born: 1992 (age 33–34) Lebanon

Playing information
- Position: Prop
Club
Years	Team	Pld	T	G	FG	P
	Lebanese American University
2011–18	Immortals
2018	Beirut Arab University
2021–22	Wolves
2022–	Immortals
	Total	0	0	0	0	0
Representative
Years	Team	Pld	T	G	FG	P
2022–	Lebanon	0				0

Rugby union career
- Position: Prop
- Current team: Beirut Phoenicians
Senior career
Years	Team	Apps	(Points)
2018–23	Beirut Phoenicians		
2025–	Oryx		

Atef Hamdan (Arabic: عاطف حمدان; born 1992) is a Lebanese multi-code rugby footballer who plays as a prop. He plays rugby league for Immortals in the Lebanon Rugby League Championship and the Lebanon national team. In rugby union, he plays for Oryx in Qatar.

== Biography ==
=== Club career ===
Hamdan played rugby league at college level for the Lebanese American University (LAU), before playing for Immortals – the LAU's team in the Lebanon Rugby League Championship – between 2011–12 and 2017–18. In 2018, he played at college level for Beirut Arab University (BAU) and rugby union for Beirut Phoenicians. Hamdan helped Wolves lift the 2021 Rugby League Championship title after beating Grey Wolves in the final on 21 October 2021.

=== Representative career ===
Having played for Lebanon Espoirs internationally in 2012, Hamdan was initially called up to represent the Lebanon national team at the 2021 Rugby League World Cup as one of only two local players in the squad, but withdrew and was replaced by Robin Hachache. In 2022, he took part in various friendly games in preparation for the upcoming West Asia Rugby Championship, playing against Syria and the French UNIFIL forces.

== Personal life ==
Hamdan graduated from the Lebanese American University in 2014.
