= Kwang-min =

- Hangul: 광민
- RR: Gwangmin
- MR: Kwangmin

Kwang-min, also spelled Gwang-min, is a Korean given name.

People with this name include:

== Footballers ==
- Kim Kwang-min (footballer, born 1962), North Korean defender and later women's national team coach
- Jung Kwang-min (born 1976), South Korean midfielder (FC Seoul)
- Kim Kwang-min (footballer, born 1985), South Korean defender (Iraqi Premier League)
- Ko Kwang-min (born 1988), South Korean midfielder (FC Seoul)
- Ju Kwang-min (born 1990), North Korean goalkeeper

== Others ==
- Go Gwang-min (born 1981), South Korean female field hockey player
- Kim Gwong-min (born 1988), South Korean rugby sevens player
- Jo Kwang-min (born 1995), South Korean singer, member of Boyfriend

== See also ==
- List of Korean given names
