= Kim Kwang-min =

Kim Kwang-min (김광민) may refer to:

- Kim Kwang-min (footballer, born 1962), North Korean footballer
- Kim Kwang-min (footballer, born 1985), South Korean footballer
- Kim Gwong-min (born 1988), South Korean rugby sevens player
