= Ben Bolger =

English rugby league & union footballer

Personal information
- Born: 13 September 1989 (age 36) Chingford, London, England
- Height: 6 ft 0 in (1.83 m)
- Weight: 14 st 11 lb (94 kg)

Playing information
- Position: Second-row
Club
Years	Team	Pld	T	G	FG	P
2010–12	Harlequins/London Broncos	33	4	0	0	16
2013–	Abu Dhabi Harlequins
	Total	33	4	0	0	16
- Source: Rugby League Project As of 6 June 2013

Benjamin Bolger (born 13 September 1989) is an English professional rugby league footballer who currently plays for Abu Dhabi Harlequins in the Emirates Rugby League competition. He previously played for London Broncos in the Super League. His position of preference is Second-row.

Born in Chingford, East London, Bolger started his rugby league career as a youth and an amateur player for Conference South side St Albans Centurions, starting as a 13-year-old, as well as playing for Saracens F.C., Chingford RFC, and representing the county of Essex, in rugby union. He signed for the Harlequins RL Under-16s after the St. Albans Centurions and was their academy player of the year for 2009. After signing professionally for the Harlequins RL at the start of 2010's Super League XV, Bolger made his début for the Harlequins RL (later London Broncos) in the season opener against Wakefield Trinity Wildcats, coming off the bench.

Along with his younger brother Sam, Bolger moved to the United Arab Emirates, and joined the Abu Dhabi Harlequins club in 2013, immediately becoming captain of the side and leading them in their inaugural rugby league campaign.
