= Kenneth Stern =

Kenneth Stern may refer to:

- Kenneth S. Stern, American defense attorney and author
- Kenneth Stern (rugby union) (born 1988), Filipino-American rugby union player
- Ken Stern, former chief executive officer of National Public Radio
