= Emirates Rugby League =

United Arab Emirates Rugby League
- Founded: 1 January 2007
- IRL affiliation: Observer (revoked in 2015)
- Responsibility: United Arab Emirates
- Headquarters: Dubai Sports City, UAE
- Key people: Sol Mokdad (Chair)
- Competitions: Rugby League Cup, Emirate Of Origin
- Website: www.uaerl.ae

(United Arab Emirates)
- As of 6 July 2009

United Arab Emirates Rugby League (or UAERL) was the governing body for rugby league in the United Arab Emirates. It operated under the auspices of the Rugby League European Federation’s Euro Med Department, the UAERL governed rugby league at all levels in the UAE, from the national team to the development of school and youth programs.

== History ==
The increased popularity of rugby league in the Middle East and Africa, specifically in Lebanon and Morocco, prompted the UAERL to announce its intentions to form an "Arab Confederation for Rugby League."

Sol Mokdad became the President of the UAERL in 2007, and oversaw the initial stages of developing the sport in the UAE, including the first international matches played by the UAE Falcons and their first victory.

The first domestic rugby league competition in the UAE was staged in 2013, with Abu Dhabi Harlequins becoming the inaugural champions. Also that year, UAERL announced the formation of the country's first junior international sides, which were to be coached by Apollo Perelini.

In April 2015 the Rugby League was forced to change its name to remove all references to the United Arab Emirates following threats from the UAE Rugby Federation, and was disbanded altogether following Mokdad's arrest at the behest of rugby union officials in May 2015.

== See also ==
- United Arab Emirates national rugby league team
