= United Arab Emirates Rugby Federation =

Sports governing body in the United Arab Emirates

UAE Rugby Federation
إتحاد الإمارات العربية المتحدة للرجبي
- Sport: Rugby union
- Founded: 2009
- World Rugby affiliation: 2012
- Asia Rugby affiliation: 2012
- Website: uaerugby.ae

The United Arab Emirates Rugby Federation (UAERF), or UAE Rugby, is the governing body for rugby union in United Arab Emirates. It organises and oversees local rugby, including the annual Dubai Sevens and Dubai Women's Sevens. It became affiliated to World Rugby (then known as IRB) and Asia Rugby in 2012 as a full status member.

== History ==
Prior to the establishment of a national governing body for UAE, rugby across the Arabian Peninsula was administered by the Arabian Gulf Rugby Football Union (AGRFU) which had been founded in 1974 and oversaw rugby until the end of 2010 in 6 member countries: UAE, Kuwait, Saudi Arabia, Bahrain, Oman and Qatar.

The International Rugby Board's governance restructuring project for the West Asia region required the AGRFU to be broken up into separate unions for each member country. The UAE Rugby Federation was the first to be formed in 2009 and the UAE national team inherited the former Arabian Gulf team's world ranking. Due to IRB eligibility regulations, a number of the Arabian Gulf's players became ineligible to qualify to play for the UAE.

The successor team made its international debut in the Asian 5 Nations in 2011. In 2014, due to difficulties with players making themselves available for national selection, the UAERF announced that any player that refused to attend after receiving a call up would be banned from playing club rugby within the UAE. In 2025, the UAERF announced that it would be putting in a joint bid to host the 2035 Rugby World Cup alongside the Qatar Rugby Federation and the Saudi Arabian Rugby Federation. However, the bid failed due to the Saudi Arabians pulling funding out.

Logo 2009–2021.

== See also ==
- United Arab Emirates national rugby union team
- Rugby union in the United Arab Emirates
- United Arab Emirates national rugby league team
