= Rugby union in the Arabian Peninsula =

Rugby union in the Arabian Peninsula is a minor, but growing sport. The game is played in six out of seven countries on the peninsula, specifically the Gulf Cooperation states of Bahrain, Kuwait, Oman, Qatar, Saudi Arabia, and the United Arab Emirates. The region hosts the annual Dubai Sevens and Dubai Women's Sevens tournaments which are global events on the World Rugby sevens series for men and women.

The six countries where rugby union is played on the Arabian Peninsula.

== History ==
Rugby was first brought to the region by the British military around the mid-20th century. In addition, some Arabian royals and nobles had been sending their sons to English private schools, where they picked up the game.

The sport was promoted by Commonwealth expatriates working in the oil industry. The Emirs, greatly interested by the phenomenon, provided grounds and financial support. The Dubai Sevens was founded in 1970, and developed into one of the premier rugby sevens tournaments in the world. The Dubai Sevens also encouraged the setting up of a number of Arab teams.

Prior to the end of 2010, rugby in all six Gulf Cooperation countries was administered by a single governing body, the Arabian Gulf Rugby Football Union (AGRFU). However, the International Rugby Board's governance restructuring project for the West Asia region under the Asian Rugby Football Union dissolved the AGRFU to allow separate national federations to be formed for each member country from 2011 onwards. The unified representative team for the six Gulf states played its final Test match in May 2010, before the split.

The UAE Rugby Federation was formed in 2009 and their national team inherited the former Arabian Gulf team's world ranking, while separate federations in Qatar and Saudi Arabia became the new sports governing bodies for rugby in those countries. Other countries previously under the unified Gulf Rugby umbrella that had not formed national governing bodies – Bahrain, Kuwait and Oman – were assisted by the UAE Rugby Federation in administering cross-border club competitions.

== See also ==
- Arabian Gulf rugby sevens team – the former unified 7-a-side representative team
- Arabian Gulf rugby union team – the former unified 15-a-side representative team
