= Jeremy Manning =

Jeremy Manning, OF
- Born: Jeremy G. Manning; 11 September 1985 (age 41) Blenheim, New Zealand
- Height: 1.78 m (5 ft 10 in)
- Weight: 83 kg (13.1 st; 183 lb)
- University: University College Cork

Rugby union career
- Position(s): Fly-half, Centre, Fullback
Amateur team(s)
Years	Team	Apps	(Points)
- UCC
–	Cork Constitution		
Senior career
Years	Team	Apps	(Points)
2005–2010	Munster	50	(173)
2010–2012	Newcastle	30	(66)
2012–	AD Harlequins		
- Correct as of 9 April 2013
International career
Years	Team	Apps	(Points)
- Ireland Students
- Correct as of 26 February 2012

Jeremy G. Manning OF (born 11 September 1985 in Blenheim, New Zealand) is a New Zealand rugby union footballer who plays for Abu Dhabi Harlequins. He qualified to play for Ireland during the 2008–09 season and has represented Ireland Students.

== Munster ==
Manning planned to sign with North Harbour in the Air New Zealand Cup for the 2008–09 season, but instead secured a new deal with Munster. Munster confirmed that he would leave the club and join Newcastle Falcons on 19 May 2010. While at Munster, he won the 2005–06 Heineken Cup. He also featured in the Munster 'A' side that reached the British and Irish Cup Final in May 2010, before signing for Newcastle Falcons that summer.

== Newcastle ==
Just a few months after joining the club, Manning signed a two-year contract extension with Newcastle in December 2010.

== Abu Dhabi Harlequins ==
His contract was not renewed after 2012 and Manning moved to Abu Dhabi, United Arab Emirates, where he signed with the Abu Dhabi Harlequins and issued the following statement:

"I'm looking forward to starting a new chapter in my life and being part of a great rugby club like Abu Dhabi Harlequins is an amazing bonus"

== Honours and awards ==
After the 2016 Summer Olympics, Manning was awarded the Officer of the Order of Fiji.
