= Rugby sevens at the 2006 Asian Games =

- Venue: Grand Hamad Stadium
- Dates: 10–11 December 2006
- Competitors: 108 from 9 nations

Rugby sevens was contested by nine teams at the 2006 Asian Games in Doha, Qatar on December 10 and 11. All games played at the Grand Hamad Stadium.

== Schedule ==
P	Preliminary round	½	Semifinals	F	Finals

Event↓/Date →	10th Sun	11th Mon	
Men	P	½	F

== Medalists ==
Event	Gold	Silver	Bronze
Men	Japan; Takeshi Fujiwara; Eiji Yamamoto; Yuki Okuzono; Yusaku Kuwazuru; Hiroki Yoshida; Takashi Sato; Takashi Suzuki; Yusuke Kobuki; Masahiro Tsuiki; Akihito Yamada; Hiroki Yamazaki; Yohei Shinomiya	South Korea; Lee Kwang-moon; Yoo Min-hyung; Youn Kwon-woo; Yang Young-hun; Yun Hi-su; Kim Hyung-ki; Chae Jae-young; Kim Jong-su; Kwak Chul-woong; Chun Jong-man; You Young-nam; Lee Myung-geun	China; He Zhongliang; Wang Jiacheng; Sun Tao; Xu Hui; Zhang Zhiqiang; Yuan Feng; Li Yang; Wang Chongyi; Lu Zhuan; Jiang Xuming; Zhang Heng; Liu Kai

== Qualification ==
As a limited number of teams could enter, The Asian Rugby Football Union announced 2005 Singer Sri Lankan Airlines Rugby 7's as the qualification event for the eight-team tournament. But later, they changed the decision and picked host nation Qatar and top 6 teams from 2002 edition, South Korea, Chinese Taipei, Thailand, Japan, China and Sri Lanka. For the last spot a qualification tournament was held in Hong Kong on 4 February 2006.

Rank	Team
1	Hong Kong
2	Malaysia
3	Kazakhstan
4	Singapore

Later they added India to the competition to make it a nine-team tournament.

== Draw ==
Pool A

- South Korea
- Thailand
- Hong Kong

Pool B

- China
- Sri Lanka
- India

Pool C

- Chinese Taipei
- Japan
- Qatar

== Squads ==
Squads

China	Chinese Taipei	Hong Kong	India
He Zhongliang; Wang Jiacheng; Sun Tao; Xu Hui; Zhang Zhiqiang; Yuan Feng; Li Yang; Wang Chongyi; Lu Zhuan; Jiang Xuming; Zhang Heng; Liu Kai	Wu Chih-wei; Chen Wen-yen; Ku Chao-hung; Sun Cheng-yen; Pan Chih-ming; Wang Kuo-feng; Chang Wei-cheng; Tung Yuan-hsiang; Chen Chih-fei; Wang Ju-an; Wang Jen-hsi; Huang Han-yang	Mark Wright; Tsang Hing Hung; Yuen Kin Ho; Li Chi Yung; Kenzo Pannell; Ricky Cheuk; Alex Gibbs; Rowan Varty; Jeff Wong; Keith Robertson; Fan Shun Kei; Anthony Haynes	Hrishikesh Pendse; Amit Lochab; Mufaddal Indorewala; Pritom Roy; Sujai Lama; Puneet Krishnamurthy; Shailesh Devrukhkar; Sendil Kumar; Nasser Hussain; Bikash Jena; Ganesh Sawant; Sheikh Saidul
Japan	Qatar	South Korea	Sri Lanka
Takeshi Fujiwara; Eiji Yamamoto; Yuki Okuzono; Yusaku Kuwazuru; Hiroki Yoshida; Takashi Sato; Takashi Suzuki; Yusuke Kobuki; Masahiro Tsuiki; Akihito Yamada; Hiroki Yamazaki; Yohei Shinomiya	Adel Al-Kathiri; Nasser Al-Remaihi; Ibrahim Al-Naser; Fahid Al-Hamad; Abdulaziz Al-Dosari; Saleh Al-Sheeb; Waleed Al-Maslamani; Mohammad Majid Malki; Abdulkarem Al-Muhannadi; Adnan Abdulla Ali; Ali Al-Hitmi; Saleh Al-Kuwari	Lee Kwang-moon; Yoo Min-hyung; Youn Kwon-woo; Yang Young-hun; Yun Hi-su; Kim Hyung-ki; Chae Jae-young; Kim Jong-su; Kwak Chul-woong; Chun Jong-man; You Young-nam; Lee Myung-geun	Anuradha Dharmathilake; Chamara Withanage; Sajith Mallikarachchi; Amjad Buksh; Saliya Kumara; Fazil Marija; Sanjeewa Jayasinghe; Dilanka Wijesekara; Lalindra Rodrigo; Nalaka Weerakkody; Ashan Karthelis; Ashan de Costa
Thailand			
Sayan Kaewmoolmuk; Somsak Mitlux; Sarayuth Thiengtrong; Korrapong Wongsalangkarn; Pichit Yingcharoen; Tosaporn Mitrak; Nantawat Wongwanichslip; Patcharapong Samaksaman; Warongkorn Khamkoet; Kitti Wangkanai; Khanthipong Meepin; Tanyavit Kuasint			

== Results ==
All times are Arabia Standard Time (UTC+03:00)

=== Preliminary round ===
==== Pool A ====
Pos	Team	Pld	W	D	L	PF	PA	PD	Pts	Qualification
1	South Korea	2	2	0	0	63	7	+56	6	Semifinals
2	Hong Kong	2	1	0	1	33	42	−9	4	Classification 5th–6th
3	Thailand	2	0	0	2	21	68	−47	2	Classification 7th–9th

Source: Official website

10 December
17:00

South Korea	21–7	Hong Kong
Try: Yun 6' c Chun (2) 10' c, 14' c Con: Yun (3/3)		Try: Wright 7+' c Con: Pannell (1/1)

Grand Hamad Stadium, Doha
Referee: Takashi Harada (Japan)

10 December
18:45

Thailand	21–26	Hong Kong
Try: Wongsalangkarn 1' c Wongwanichslip (2) 8' c, 14+' c Con: Wongwanichslip (3/3)		Try: Wright 4' c Robertson 7+' c Varty 11' m Cheuk 14+' c Con: Pannell (3/4)

Grand Hamad Stadium, Doha
Referee: Shi Yongjin (China)

10 December
20:30

South Korea	42–0	Thailand
Try: Chun (3) 2' c, 5' c, 10' c Kim H. 3' c Youn 7' c Lee K. 14' c Con: Chun (3/3); Yun (3/3)

Grand Hamad Stadium, Doha
Referee: Chou Wen-liang (Chinese Taipei)

==== Pool B ====
Pos	Team	Pld	W	D	L	PF	PA	PD	Pts	Qualification
1	China	2	2	0	0	72	5	+67	6	Semifinals
2	Sri Lanka	2	1	0	1	53	31	+22	4	Classification 5th–6th
3	India	2	0	0	2	0	89	−89	2	Classification 7th–9th

Source: Official website

10 December
17:30

China	41–0	India
Try: Li (3) 1' c, 10' c, 11' m Lu (2) 3' m, 14+' m Sun 7' c Xu 13' m Con: Zhang Z. (2/4); Sun (1/2); Li (0/1)

Grand Hamad Stadium, Doha
Referee: Kim Do-suk (South Korea)

10 December
19:15

Sri Lanka	48–0	India
Try: Jayasinghe (3) 3' c, 6' m, 9' c Marija 7+' m Weerakkody (2) 9' m, 13' c de Costa (2) 10' c, 14' m Con: Marija (1/2); Weerakkody (2/4) de Costa (1/1)

Grand Hamad Stadium, Doha
Referee: Takashi Harada (Japan)

10 December
21:00

China	31–5	Sri Lanka
Try: Sun 4' m Li 6' m He 9' c Lu (2) 12' c, 14' c Con: Zhang Z. (3/5)		Try: Buksh 4' m Con: Buksh (0/1)

Grand Hamad Stadium, Doha
Referee: Tobi Lothian (Great Britain)

==== Pool C ====
Pos	Team	Pld	W	D	L	PF	PA	PD	Pts	Qualification
1	Japan	2	2	0	0	82	7	+75	6	Semifinals
2	Chinese Taipei	2	1	0	1	89	24	+65	4	Semifinals
3	Qatar	2	0	0	2	0	140	−140	2	Classification 7th–9th

Source: Official website

10 December
18:00

Chinese Taipei	82–0	Qatar
Try: Chen W. 1' c Wang J.A. 2' c Wu (2) 3' c, 7+' c Wang K. (2) 4' c, 11' c Pan (3) 5' c, 6' c, 13' c Chang 9' c Wang J.H. 14' m Huang 14+' c Con: Chang (11/12)

Grand Hamad Stadium, Doha
Referee: Tobi Lothian (Great Britain)

10 December
19:45

Japan	58–0	Qatar
Try: Yamada (5) 1' m, 4' m, 6' m, 10' m, 12' m Kobuki 4' c Suzuki (2) 7+' m, 9' c Tsuiki 10' c Fujiwara 14' c Con: Yoshida (2/6); Kobuki (2/3); Sato (0/1)

Grand Hamad Stadium, Doha
Referee: Shi Yongjin (China)

10 December
21:30

Chinese Taipei	7–24	Japan
Try: Chen W. 7' c Con: Chang (1/1)		Try: Tsuiki 4' m Kuwazuru 10' c Fujiwara 13' m Yoshida 14+' c Con: Yoshida (2/4)

Grand Hamad Stadium, Doha
Referee: Dilroy Fernando (Sri Lanka)

==== Summary ====
Pos	Team	Pld	W	D	L	PF	PA	PD	Pts	Qualification
1	Japan	2	2	0	0	82	7	+75	6	Semifinals
2	China	2	2	0	0	72	5	+67	6	Semifinals
3	South Korea	2	2	0	0	63	7	+56	6	Semifinals
4	Chinese Taipei	2	1	0	1	89	24	+65	4	Semifinals
5	Sri Lanka	2	1	0	1	53	31	+22	4	Classification 5th–6th
6	Hong Kong	2	1	0	1	33	42	−9	4	Classification 5th–6th
7	Thailand	2	0	0	2	21	68	−47	2	Classification 7th–9th
8	India	2	0	0	2	0	89	−89	2	Classification 7th–9th
9	Qatar	2	0	0	2	0	140	−140	2	Classification 7th–9th

Source: Official website

=== Classification 7th–9th ===
Classification 8th–9th
11 December
India	17
Qatar	5

Classification 7th–8th
11 December
Thailand	29
India	0

==== Classification 8th–9th ====
11 December
17:00

India	17–5	Qatar
Try: Krishnamurthy 3' c Hussain 9' m Jena 11' m Con: Hussain (1/3)		Try: Al-Muhannadi 7' m Con: Al-Sheeb (0/1)

Grand Hamad Stadium, Doha
Referee: Shi Yongjin (China)

==== Classification 7th–8th ====
11 December
19:00

Thailand	29–0	India
Try: Wongwanichslip (4) 3' m, 6' m, 8' c, 12' m Wangkanai 4' c Con: Wongwanichslip (2/5)

Grand Hamad Stadium, Doha
Referee: Dilroy Fernando (Sri Lanka)

=== Classification 5th–6th ===
11 December
19:30

Sri Lanka	5–35	Hong Kong
Try: Jayasinghe 14+' m Con: Kumara (0/1)		Try: Wright 6' c Robertson 7+' c Tsang 10' c Varty 12' c Wong 14' c Con: Pannell (5/5)

Grand Hamad Stadium, Doha
Referee: Shi Yongjin (China)

=== Final round ===
Semifinals
11 December
Japan	22
Chinese Taipei	7
11 December
China	5
South Korea	19

Gold medal match
11 December
Japan	27
South Korea	26
Bronze medal match
11 December
Chinese Taipei	12
China	19

==== Semifinals ====
11 December
17:30

Japan	22–7	Chinese Taipei
Try: Yoshida 4' m Suzuki (2) 7+' m, 10' c Sato 13' m Con: Yoshida (1/3); Kobuki (0/1)		Try: Wang K. 14+' c Con: Chang (1/1)

Grand Hamad Stadium, Doha
Referee: Tobi Lothian (Great Britain)

11 December
18:00

China	5–19	South Korea
Try: Wang C. 13' m Con: Zhang Z. (0/1)		Try: Lee K. 2' m Yang 10' c Kwak 14+' c Con: Yun (2/3)

Grand Hamad Stadium, Doha
Referee: Takashi Harada (Japan)

==== Bronze medal match ====
11 December
20:00

Chinese Taipei	12–19	China
Try: Tung 6' m Pan 13' c Con: Chang (0/1); Wang K. (1/1)		Try: Wang J. 3' c Zhang Z. 14+' m Li 14+' c Con: Zhang Z. (2/3)

Grand Hamad Stadium, Doha
Referee: Takashi Harada (Japan)

==== Gold medal match ====
11 December
20:30

Japan	27–26	South Korea
Try: Yamamoto 7' m Yoshida 10+' m Yamada (2) 13' c, 20+' m Tsuiki 20' m Con: Yoshida (1/5)		Try: Kim J. (2) 2' c, 11' m Kwak 5' c Lee M. 15' c Con: Yun (3/4)

Grand Hamad Stadium, Doha
Referee: Tobi Lothian (Great Britain)

== Final standing ==
Rank	Team	Pld	W	D	L
1st place, gold medalist(s)	Japan	4	4	0	0
2nd place, silver medalist(s)	South Korea	4	3	0	1
3rd place, bronze medalist(s)	China	4	3	0	1
4	Chinese Taipei	4	1	0	3
5	Hong Kong	3	2	0	1
6	Sri Lanka	3	1	0	2
7	Thailand	3	1	0	2
8	India	4	1	0	3
9	Qatar	3	0	0	3
