= Immortals RLFC =

Lebanese rugby league club, based in Beirut

IMMORTALS R.L.F.C.
Club information
- Full name: LAU IMMORTALS Rugby League Football Club
- Nickname: Immortals
- Founded: 2002

Current details
- Ground: Bhamdoun Municipal Stadium (5,000)
- CEO: (Lebanon) Sami Garabedian
- Competition: Lebanon Rugby League Championship
- 2010–11: Championsnd

Records
- Most capped: 65 – (Lebanon) Rudy Hachache
- Highest points scorer: 454 – (Lebanon) Rudy Hachache

The Lebanese American University Immortals RLFC is a rugby league team that has been participating in Lebanese Rugby League Committee competitions since its first domestic championship in 2002.

== History ==
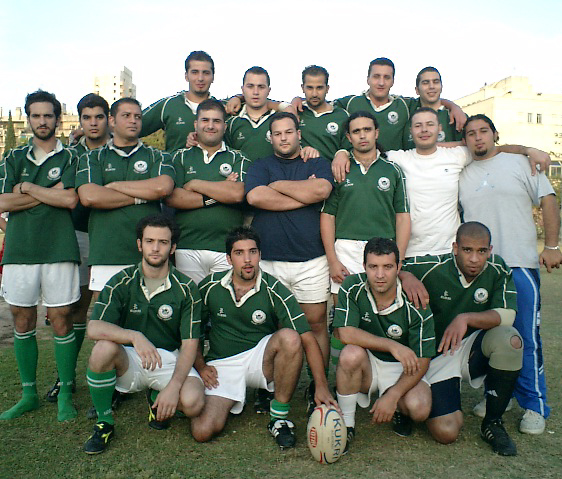
The Immortals Squad that defeated the AUB Wolves RLFC in the spring 2004 Championship Final 34–22 to clinch their second spring title in a row. From left to right: First Row: Freddy, Marwan, Salim, Charbel Second Row: Omar, Majed, Hazem, Nayef, Karim, Sam, Nouri, Abbas Third Row: Ibrahim, Ahmad, Roy, Jawad, Raja, Rudy (Missing)

In 2001, RLIF sanctions the development plan for Lebanese rugby league.

As it became the unofficial tradition the Immortals RLFC couldn’t win both championship in a row finished their 2006 spring championship in second behind the Razorbacks. The Razorbacks won a well-deserved final game in Balamand Stadium 36–14 to clinch their second Title. During the 2006 spring championship, the Immortals RLFC travelled to France to play in a seven’s tournament as part of the "Tournoi des 5 Ballons "organized by the ESEC University. The Immortals tied point with a Russian and French university but failed to play the final game by a mere try in tries difference. The Immortals took third place after beating a Spanish university in their last game. The Sami Halabi era came to an end due to the fact that Mr. Halabi was forced to travel, the Immortals RLFC appointed Both Ibrahim Ballout and the Lebanese Rugby League undoubtedly best player Rudy Hachach as team coaches. The Immortals had a perfect season. They finished their season undefeated and won their final game against their bitter rivals the Wolves RLFC in Bhamdoun 36–10. During this season, the Immortals set the Lebanese Rugby League championship winning margin record 82–0 against Club Libanais (now known as Jounieh Al Galacticos RLFC) on January 14, 2007, in Bhamdoun Stadium.

The second version of the 2008/2009 Bank of Beirut Championship also finished the season with a first undefeated season but also lost to Galacticos in the final in an epic game after they conceded four tries in the first but came back in the second half. The Immortals were leading until they lost in the last minute with a correct try disallowed and a controversial penalty.

The 2010/2011 went as smooth as the previous year, the immortals clinched their seventh title by finishing again undefeated on top of the league table and beating AUB red backs in a close final game 16–8. During their campaign the Immortals travelled to Czech Republic where they won also the RL 9’s tournament – Pardubice without losing any game and their half back Walid Yassine chosen as Tournament MVP.

== Colours ==
Immortals RLFC
Team kit

Immortals RLFC
Team kit

The Immortals first played with the French Tricolor jerseys (Blue, White and red) due to the lack of suitable rugby league clothing in Lebanon. The jerseys were donated by the French Rugby League Federation post the 2002 Mediterranean Cup. All these jerseys carried the number 13. But due to its affiliation with the Lebanese American University, the Immortals adopted green and white as their official club colors in the following years.

== Team logo ==
The logo represent the face of a fictional figure of an Immortal.

== Honours ==
- Local Cups:

Lebanese Rugby League Spring Champions: 2003 - 2004 - 2005
Lebanese Rugby League Winter Champions: 2005 - 2006
Bank of Beirut Champions: 2009/2010 - 2010/2011

== Squad ==
- Squad:

No	Nat	Player	Position	Height (m)	Weight (Kg)	Age	Previous club	Years
1	(Lebanon)	Hazem Tawil*	fullback	1.80	92	19	Immortals RLFC	3
2	(Lebanon)	Hassan Jammal	right wing	1.72	64	20	Immortals RLFC	2
3	(Lebanon)	Nabil Tawil	right-centre	1.79	84	22	Immortals RLFC	4
4	(Lebanon)	George Rahal	left-centre	1.78	89	22	Black Lions RUFC	4
5	(Lebanon)	Mazen Knio*	centre	1.92	94	34	Immortals RLFC	12
6	(England)	Karim Jammal*	stand-off	1.73	83	20	Phoenicians RUFC	2
7	(France)	Jad El-Hashem*	scrum-half	1.75	86	20	Immortals RLFC	2
8	(Lebanon)	Rateb Shallah	prop	1.86	111	22	Immortals RLFC	3
9	(Republic of Ireland)	Mounir Finan	hooker	1.74	98	21	Immortals RLFC	2
10	(Lebanon)	Nayef Abi Said	prop	1.85	118	28	Immortals RLFC	7
11	(Republic of Ireland)	Ray Finan	prop	1.82	98	20	Phoenicians RUFC	3
11	(Lebanon)	Rudy Hachache	second-row	1.85	117	29	Immortals RLFC	7
12	(Lebanon)	Kahil Bejjani	second-row	1.81	88	25	Wolves RLFC	4
13	(Lebanon)	Ibrahim Balout (C)	loose forward	1.85	102	26	Immortals RLFC	3
14	(Lebanon)	Freddy Beaini	loose forward	1.77	74	24	Immortals RLFC	5
15	(Lebanon)	Darwish Nahouzi	second-row	1.64	70	24	Immortals RLFC	2
16	(Canada)	Ramez Ghandour*	prop	1.76	95	21	--	Rookie
17	(Lebanon)	Hassan Shaheen	wing	1.80	75	20	Immortals RLFC	2
18	(Lebanon)	Ahmad Fadlalah	second-row	1.80	87	19	Immortals RLFC	2
19	(Lebanon)	Shawkat El Ghazi	prop	1.76	95	21	--	Rookie
20	(Lebanon)	Kassem Abdo	wing	1.75	82	20	--	Rookie
21	(Lebanon)	Alaa Khashab	wing	1.80	65	22	--	Rookie
22	(Palestine)	Hani Assi	prop	1.82	94	25	--	Rookie
23	(Palestine)	Khalil Namro	second-row	1.88	94	20	--	Rookie
24	(Lebanon)	Abed Hammoud	centre	1.78	83	19	--	Rookie
25	(Lebanon)	Yves Khoury	centre	1.85	80	22	Immortals RLFC	2
26	(France)	Kevin Haddad*	wing	1.75	83	21	Immortals RLFC	2
27	(Australia)	Walid Yassine	centre	1.87	75	18	--	Rookie
28	(Lebanon)	Adam Itani	second-row	1.84	85	26	--	Rookie
29	(Lebanon)	Omar Wehbe	left wing	1.81	86	22	Immortals RLFC	2
30		Hassan El Sabeh	prop	1.81	156	23	DRFC	6

- Staff As November 2008

Nat	Name	Position	Age	Previous club	Years
(Lebanon) (Australia)	Raymond Safi	Head coach	34	Wolves RLFC	2
(Lebanon)	Rudy Hachache	Assistant Coach	29	Immortals RLFC	3
(Lebanon)	Nayef Abi Said	Assistant Coach	28	Immortals RLFC	2
(Palestine)	Hani Assi	Physical Trainer	25	Cedars (Lebanese Rugby League National Team)	1
(Lebanon)	Maher Fadlalah	Physio	38	Lebanese American University	3

== Rivalries ==
The Immortals and their fans have developed rivalries with other clubs.

== Records ==
=== Player records ===
LRLC STATS 2002 - 2007 (10 Seasons)

- Top 10 scorers (regular season only)
  - 1. Rudy Hachache (LAU) 454 (111 tries, 5 goals)
  - 2. Sami Halabi (LAU) 328 (45 tries, 74 goals)
  - 4. Jawad Fakih (LAU) 230 (48 tries, 19 goals)
  - 8. Ibrahim Ballout (LAU) 138 (11 tries, 47 goals)
- Top 10 try scorers (regular season only)
  - 1. Rudy Hachache (LAU) 111
  - 2. Jawad Fakih (LAU) 48
  - 3. 45
- Top 10 goal scorers (regular season only – minimum 50 points)
  - 1. Sami Halabi (LAU) 148 (64%)
  - 3. Ibrahim Ballout (LAU) 94 (62%)
  - 5. Hamid Wazni (LAU) 78 (72%) (Played Only Two Consecutive Seasons)
- John Elias Award (The Lebanese Rugby League MVP Award):
  - Jawad Fakih : Winter 2005
  - Robin Hachach: 2008
  - Rudy Hachache : Spring 2004 - Winter 2006
  - Sami Halabi : Spring 2003 - Spring 2005

=== Team records ===
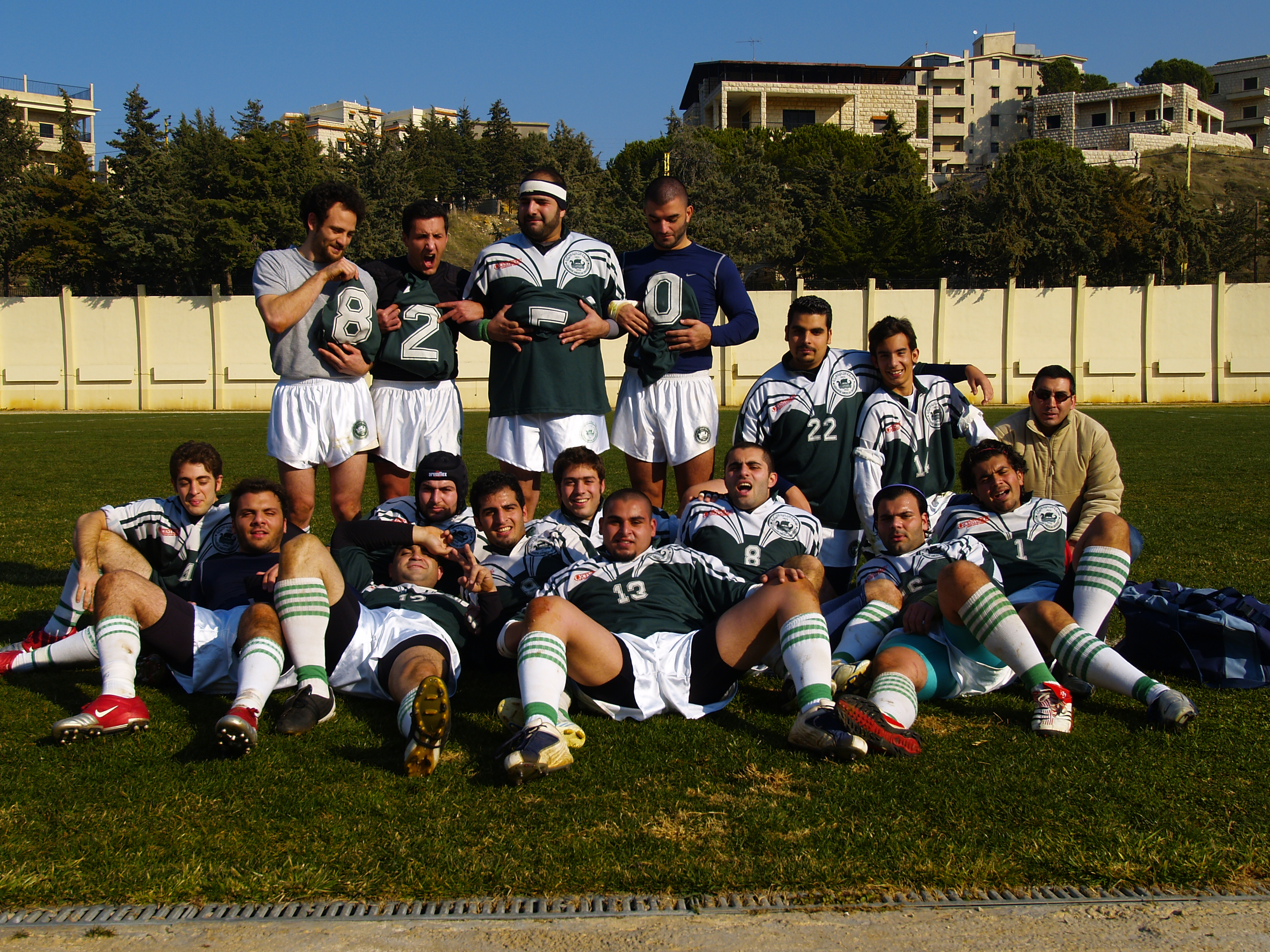
The team players illustrating the Lebanese Rugby League Championship Winning Margin Record 82-0 against Club Libanais (now known as Jounieh Al Galacticos RLFC) on January 14th, 2007 in Bhamdoun Stadium.

- First team to win the Spring Championship
- First team to win both the Spring Championship and the Winter Championship
