= Wayne McDonald =

Former Scotland & UAE international rugby league footballer

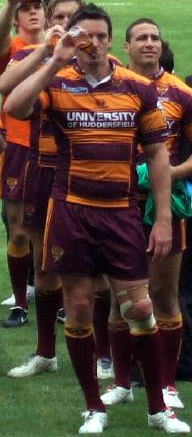

Personal information
- Born: 3 September 1975 (age 50) Leeds, West Yorkshire, England

Playing information
- Height: 6 ft 7 in (2.01 m)
- Weight: 19 st 10 lb (125 kg)
- Position: Prop, Second-row
Club
Years	Team	Pld	T	G	FG	P
1993–99	Wakefield Trinity (Wildcats)	27	8	0	0	32
2000	Hull Sharks	13	4	0	0	16
2001	St Helens	18	4	0	0	16
2002–05	Leeds Rhinos	81	14	0	0	56
2005	Wigan Warriors	4	0	0	0	0
2005–06	Huddersfield Giants	34	1	0	0	4
	Total	177	31	0	0	124
Representative
Years	Team	Pld	T	G	FG	P
1999	Scotland	6	0	0	0	0
2009	UAE	2	2	0	0	8

Wayne McDonald (born 3 September 1975) is a former professional rugby league footballer. McDonald appeared in the Super League playing over 175 games in the 1990s and 2000s. McDonald played his club football for the Wakefield Trinity Wildcats, Hull FC, St Helens, Leeds Rhinos, Wigan Warriors and the Huddersfield Giants. McDonald retired at the end of the 2006 Super League season ending his 12-year-long career. McDonald was also the tallest player to have played in Super League standing at 6 ft 7 in (2.01 m), until surpassed by Corentin Le Cam in 2021 who stands at 6 ft 9 in (2.06 m).

McDonald represented Scotland between 1999 and 2005, featuring in the 2000 Rugby League World Cup, and captaining the team in the European Tri-nations tournaments.

McDonald played for the Huddersfield Giants in the 2006 Challenge Cup Final from the interchange bench against St. Helens but the Huddersfield Giants lost 12–42.

McDonald also played for the United Arab Emirates in 2009.
