= Jad Hashem =

Lebanese rugby league footballer

Jad el-Hashem (Arabic: جاد الهاشم; born 1 January 1988 in Beirut, Lebanon) is a professional rugby league footballer who played for the Lebanese American University's Immortals RLFC and in the Lebanese Rugby League Championship. His positions of choice are at Halfback, Five Eight; however due to his versatility, Hashem can also play in the Fullback position.

== Playing career ==
Hashem was named to the Lebanon national rugby league team training squad for the 2009 European Cup and went on to play in the international tournament against Italy, Ireland, Wales and Scotland.

He also represented Lebanon in many Test Matches (2010–2013).

In 2011, Hashem started playing for the Lebanese Rugby Union National Team.
