= Lebanese Rugby League Federation =

Rugby League Federation in Lebanon

- Founded: 27 September 2003
- Responsibility: Lebanon
- Headquarters: Safra, Lebanon
- Key people: Mohammed Habbous, COO Remond Safi (President); Remond Safi (Chief Executive)
- Competitions: Lebanon Rugby League ChampionshipLebanon University Shield League ChampionshipLebanon Youth Rugby League Championship
- Website: www.lebanonrl.com/

(Lebanon)
- As of 4 September 2010

The Lebanese Rugby League Federation (LRLF) is the governing body for rugby league football in Lebanon. They are full members of the Rugby League European Federation and full members of the Rugby League International Federation.

The Lebanese Rugby League moved from its original headquarters in Sydney, Australia and is now based in Safra in Lebanon.

In 2024, the body was downgraded to affiliate member due to noncompliance with the full membership criteria.

== History ==
A group of Australian-born rugby league players with Lebanese heritage, mostly from inner-city Sydney formed a Lebanese national side with a view to entering the 2000 Rugby League World Cup. The Lebanese Rugby League Committee was formed in 2003. It was initially based in Sydney, Australia.

The Lebanese Rugby League Committee was awarded full federation status in Lebanon on 30 December 2009.

In 2010 the LRL changed its logo, adopting a competition submission by Bashir Srour of Beirut. The design incorporates a representation of a rugby league ball, the cedar of the Lebanese flag and the numerals "XIII" symbolising rugby league. The use of the colour red represents "strength and power" while the green represents the cedar. The sharp edges of the font used for "LRLF" represent the intensity and roughness of the sport.

== See also ==
- Rugby league in Lebanon
