= Mian Hamza Hayauddin =

Pakistan international rugby union footballer

Hamza Hayauddin
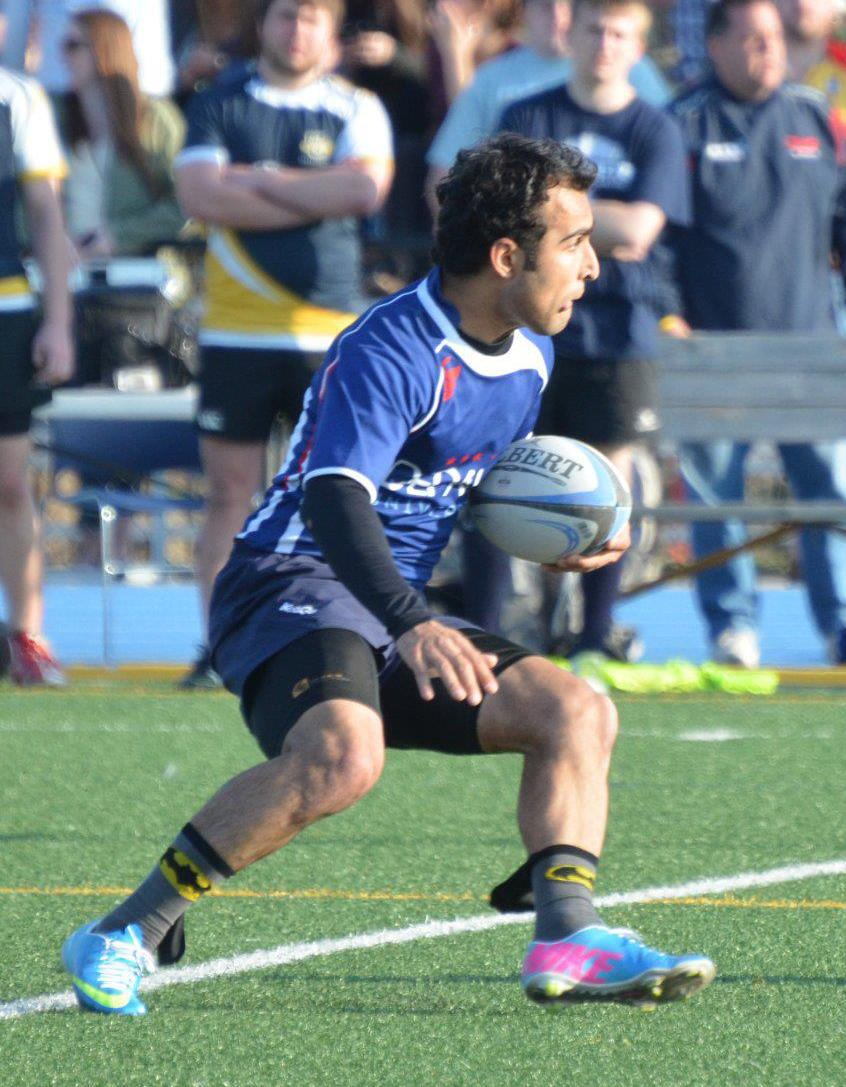
- Hayauddin with DePaul RFC in 2012
- Born: Mian Hamza Hayaud Din; 11 July 1989 (age 37) Rawalpindi, Pakistan
- Height: 1.73 m (5 ft 8 in)
- Weight: 72 kg (11 st 5 lb)

Rugby union career
- Position(s): Fullback, Wing, or Scrumhalf
- Current team: Islamabad Jinns
Senior career
Years	Team	Apps	(Points)
2011-12	Chicago Blaze RFC		
- Chicago All-Stars
2011	New York All-Stars		
- Correct as of 4 November 2014
International career
Years	Team	Apps	(Points)
2012–	Pakistan	2	

Mian Hamza Hayaud Din (born 11 July 1989) is a Pakistani international rugby player who plays for the Islamabad Jinns RFC in the Servis Super League. Hayauddin has represented the Pakistani national team in rugby union as well as rugby sevens. He is the grandson of former Pakistani general Mian Hayaud Din and son of senior Pakistani civil servant Mian Asad Hayauddin.

== Biography ==
Hayauddin attended Bard College where he began playing rugby for Bard College RFC in his junior year (2010). After playing for the Kingston Mad Dogs RFC, Chicago Blaze RFC, and DePaul University RFC between 2011, 2012, and 2013 respectively, he returned to Pakistan in order to qualify for the Pakistan rugby union team. Most recently, he represented Pakistan rugby sevens at the 2014 Asian Games in Incheon, South Korea.

== Rugby ==
Hayauddin is known for his dangerous sidestep which his teammates refer to as "happy feet" and his cover defence. He plays fullback and scrumhalf. His premier tournament debut occurred at the 2014 Asian Games against Hong Kong.
