= Lee Kwang-moon =

- Born: 4 August 1982 (age 44) South Korea
- Height: 188 cm (6 ft 2 in)
- Weight: 100 kg (220 lb)

Rugby union career
- Position(s): Number eight, flanker
Amateur team(s)
Years	Team	Apps	(Points)
2009	KEPCO		
Senior career
Years	Team	Apps	(Points)
2008	Suntory		
2010-	Toyota Motors		
International career
Years	Team	Apps	(Points)
2003-2013	South Korea	8	
Medal record
Men's rugby sevens
Representing South Korea
Asian Games
Silver medal – second place	2006 Doha	Team

Lee Kwang-moon (Korean: 이광문; Hanja: 李光紋, born August 4, 1983) is a South Korean rugby union player. He plays as a number eight and occasionally a flanker.
