= Lomano Lemeki =

Japan international rugby union player

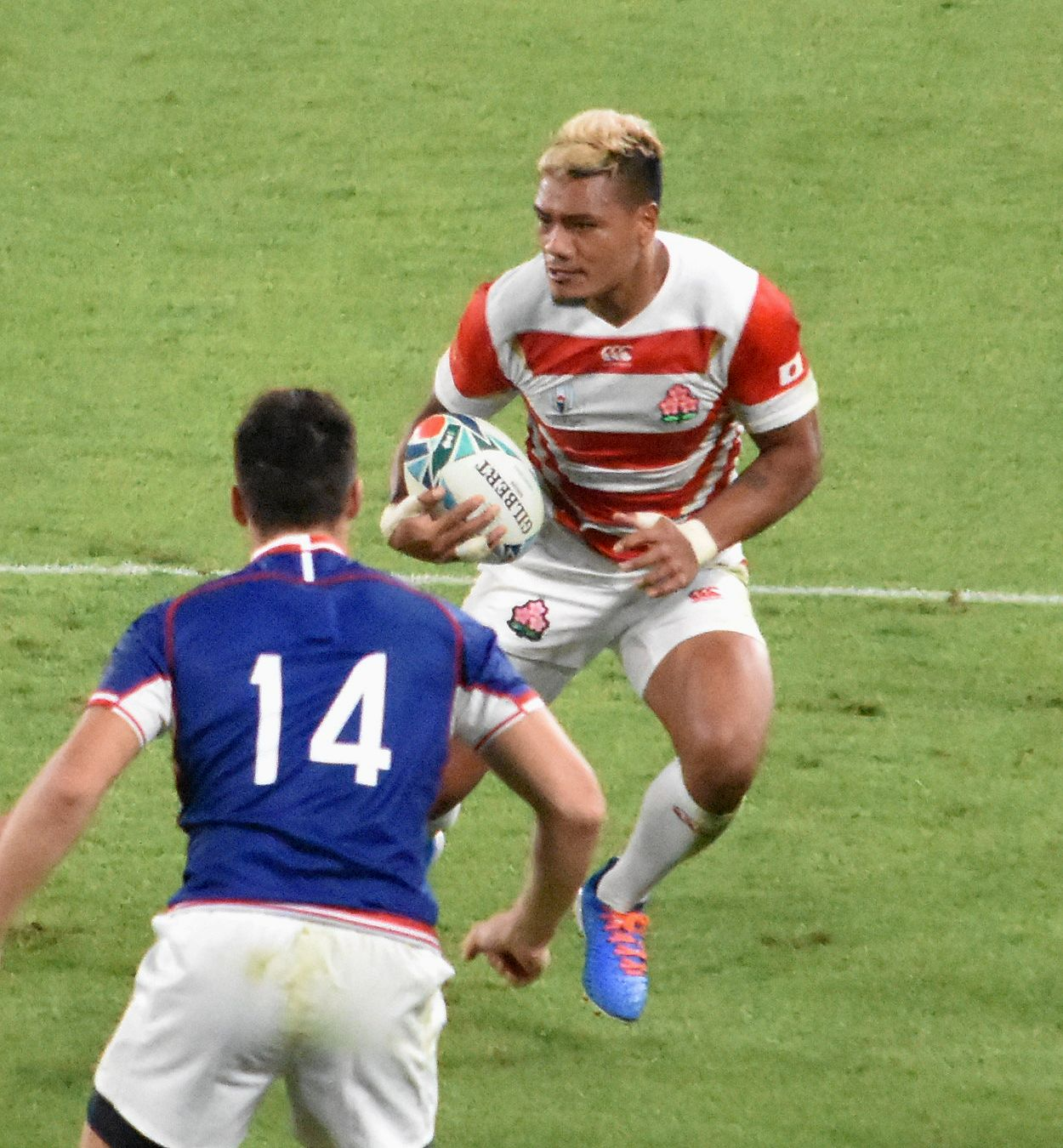
- Lemeki representing Japan during the Rugby World Cup
- Full name: Lomano Lava Lemeki
- Born: 20 January 1989 (age 37) Auckland, New Zealand
- Height: 1.77 m (5 ft 10 in)
- Weight: 96 kg (212 lb; 15 st 2 lb)
- School: Liston College

Rugby union career
- Position(s): Wing, Fullback, Centre, Fly-half
- Current team: Honda Heat
Senior career
Years	Team	Apps	(Points)
2009–2011	Canon Eagles	16	(65)
2011–2012	Mazda Blue Zoomers	2	(0)
2014–2020 2024–	Honda Heat	66	(279)
2018	Sunwolves	7	(10)
2021	Munakata Sanix Blues	2	(5)
2022–2024	NEC Green Rockets	42	(105)
- Correct as of 28 August 2023
International career
Years	Team	Apps	(Points)
2016–2023	Japan	20	(40)
- Correct as of 28 August 2023
National sevens team
Years	Team		Comps
2014–2016	Japan		24
- Correct as of 28 August 2023

Lomano Lava Lemeki (レメキ ロマノ, Remeki Romano; born 20 January 1989) is a professional rugby union player who plays as a wing for Japan Rugby League One club Green Rockets Tokatsu. Born in New Zealand, he represents Japan at international level after qualifying on residency grounds.

== International career ==
Lemeki grew up in New Zealand before moving to Japan in 2009. He helped Japan win the 2013 Thailand Sevens when he scored the match-winning try against Hong Kong 7s to seal their victory.

== Personal life ==
He married a Japanese woman and received Japanese citizenship in 2014.
