= Abu Dhabi Harlequins =

Rugby union & league club based in Abu Dhabi

(United Arab Emirates) Abu Dhabi Harlequins
- Full name: Abu Dhabi Harlequins
- Founded: 1970; 56 years ago
- Location: United Arab Emirates
- Ground: Zayed Sports Stadium
- Chairman: Andy Cole
- League: UAE Premiership

Official website
- www.abudhabiquins.com

Abu Dhabi Harlequins is a rugby union and rugby league team based in Abu Dhabi, UAE. They currently play in the UAE Premiership. The team was founded as the Abu Dhabi RUFC in 1970.

The 'Quins' were crowned UAE Premiership Champions of the 2022 rugby season, having had an entire 2020/21 season without any rugby at all due to covid restrictions.

They beat the Dubai Exiles 28-34 in the UAE Premiership Final.

== Notable players ==
- (Republic of Ireland) Jeremy Manning - 50 caps for Munster Rugby, 30 for Newcastle Falcons.
- Sean Crombie - Scotland U21 and Scotland 7's international. Former Edinburgh Rugby and Newcastle Falcons player
- Ed Lewsey - Wales U19 international. former Exeter Chiefs and Plymouth Albion player
- (England) Ben Bolger - former London Broncos (Super League) rugby league footballer.

== Rugby League ==
The Harlequins switched to rugby league in 2013, taking part in the inaugural Emirates Rugby League Cup competition. They were the inaugural Emirates Rugby League champions, beating Mana Dubai in the final of the competition.
