= Park Wan-yong =

South Korean rugby sevens player

- Born: 2 June 1984 (age 42)
- Height: 170 cm (5 ft 7 in)
- Weight: 74 kg (163 lb; 11 st 9 lb)

Rugby union career
- Position(s): Scrum-half, Wing
International career
Years	Team	Apps	(Points)
2004–2022	South Korea		(0)
National sevens team
Years	Team		Comps
- South Korea
Medal record
Men's rugby sevens
Representing South Korea
Asian Games
Silver medal – second place	2022 Hangzhou	Team
Bronze medal – third place	2010 Guangzhou	Team
Bronze medal – third place	2014 Incheon	Team

Park Wan-yong (born 2 June 1984) is a South Korean rugby sevens player. He competed in the men's tournament at the 2020 Summer Olympics. He also represented South Korea at the 2022 Rugby World Cup Sevens in Cape Town, South Africa.
