= Rugby union in Saudi Arabia =

- Country: Saudi Arabia
- National team: Saudi Arabia
- First played: Mid 20th Century

Rugby union in Saudi Arabia is a minor but growing sport, which has been played for several decades in the Kingdom of Saudi Arabia. Many of the local rugby union teams date back to the late 1970s.

== Governing body ==
Rugby is a developing sport in the kingdom. The current Saudi Arabian Rugby Federation is licensed by the Saudi government and is a member of Asia Rugby. Its current board of directors are:

- Ali Al Dajani (Chairman)
- Khalid Al Mansour
- Hadeel Bakhsh
- Lojain Al Harbi
- Mansour Al Dehaiman
- Sami Amin

== History ==
Due to the climate, Saudi rugby has been frequently played in extreme temperatures, with high temperatures or even on sand. Games are usually held in the evening for this reason.

Rugby union was introduced into Saudi Arabia by the British in the mid-twentieth century. Due to the influx of western workers, rugby has experienced a form of revival and for a while had a significant number of Saudi nationals playing.

Saudi Arabia participated in the 2014 Asian Games in Incheon, South Korea. On 29 April 2016 Saudi Arabia played against Jordan in their first World Rugby recognized international game.

Saudi Rugby Federation has no recognized clubs in the kingdom, however there are currently 6 teams in Saudi Arabia:

- Jeddah Team (Scorpions)
- Riyadh Team (Scorpions, Falcons, Warriors)
- Khobar Team (Eagles)
- Yanbu Team (Legend)

In November 2012, a national team consisting only of Saudi nationals entered the West Asia 7's competition in Dubai. They finished 3rd overall with Lebanon taking the title.
