= Kim Hyun-soo (rugby union) =

South Korean rugby sevens player

- Born: 8 November 1988 (age 38)
- Height: 181 cm (5 ft 11 in)
- Weight: 98 kg (216 lb; 15 st 6 lb)

Rugby union career
- Position: Centre
International career
| Years | Team | Apps | (Points) |
| 2011– | South Korea | | (0) |
National sevens team
| Years | Team | | Comps |
| 2010– | South Korea | | |
Medal record
Men's rugby sevens
Representing South Korea
Asian Games
| Silver medal – second place | 2022 Hangzhou | Team |
| Bronze medal – third place | 2010 Guangzhou | Team |
| Bronze medal – third place | 2014 Incheon | Team |
| Bronze medal – third place | 2018 Jakarta–Palembang | Team |

Kim Hyun-soo (born 8 November 1988) is a South Korean rugby sevens player. He competed in the men's tournament at the 2020 Summer Olympics. He also competed at the 2022 Rugby World Cup Sevens in Cape Town, South Africa.
