= Han Kun-kyu =

South Korean rugby sevens player

- Born: 22 January 1987 (age 39)
- Height: 187 cm (6 ft 2 in)
- Weight: 107 kg (236 lb; 16 st 12 lb)

Rugby union career
- Position: Number 8
International career
Years	Team	Apps	(Points)
2007–	South Korea		
National sevens team
Years	Team		Comps
2007–	South Korea		
Medal record
Men's rugby sevens
Representing South Korea
Asian Games
Silver medal – second place	2022 Hangzhou	Team
Bronze medal – third place	2010 Guangzhou	Team
Bronze medal – third place	2014 Incheon	Team
Bronze medal – third place	2018 Jakarta–Palembang	Team

Han Kun-kyu (born 22 January 1987) is a South Korean rugby union and sevens player. He competed for South Korea at the 2020 Summer Olympics.

== Early career ==
A high school gym teacher, who was a former rugby player, introduced him to the sport. He attended Yonsei University and while in his senior year there he was scouted by the Korea Armed Forces Athletic Corps as an athlete.

== Rugby career ==
Han was a stand out player for the South Korean fifteens team in the 2009 Asian Five Nations. He scored a brace of tries in his sides 36–34 victory over Hong Kong in the tournament. He also competed in the 2010 Asian Five Nations tournament.

He was in the South Korean fifteens team that participated in the 2017 Asia Rugby Championship, he scored their first try against Japan at the Incheon Namdong Asiad Rugby Field. He was part of the South Korean sevens squad that competed in the 2018 Hong Kong Sevens.

Han was part of South Korea's sevens team that competed at the delayed 2020 Summer Olympics in Tokyo in 2021. He featured for the sevens team in the Incheon leg of the 2022 Asia Rugby Sevens Series.

In 2023, he competed for the South Korean sevens side at the Asian Games in Hangzhou. He scored a try and helped his side defeat Chinese Taipei in their opening match of the competition.
