= Shehan Pathirana =

- Born: 27 January 1992 (age 34)
- Height: 6 ft 2 in (188 cm)
- School: Royal College, Colombo 7

Rugby union career
- Position: Loose forward
International career
Years	Team	Apps	(Points)
- Sri Lanka

Shehan "Lema" Pathirana (born 27 January 1992) is a Sri Lankan youth rugby union player. He has represented Sri Lanka at the Asian Youth Rugby Championships in 2010 and at the Junior Rugby Asiad in 2011. He has represented Royal College, Colombo at the 1st XV level since 2006. He captained Royal College, Colombo at the 67th in 2011.

He played No. 8 or flanker for Royal College from 2006 to 2011. In 2011, he led a young Royal team that emerged A Division Champions at the Singer Inter-School Rugby League, remaining unbeaten throughout the league. He was the winner of the "Thepapare.com Most Popular SchoolBoy Ruggerite of the Year" competition in 2011, winning by a landslide margin over the other competitors. He also Vice Captained both Colombo Blues and the U20 National Youth Rugby Teams in 2011. Pathirana is known commonly as "Lema" among his mates due to his tall, lanky appearance and a certain "Lemonade" jersey he wears frequently. Pathirana was awarded the Royal Crown in 2010 in recognition for his service for the college.

Shehan Pathirana represented "Uva Vipers" Team at Carlton Super 7s Rugby Tournament in 2011.
