= United Arab Emirates national rugby league team =

United Arab Emirates

Team information
- Nickname: The Falcons
- Governing body: UAE Rugby Federation
- Region: Europe
- Home stadium: Dubai Sports City

Team results
- First game
- Lebanon 48 – 18 United Arab Emirates (Bhamdoun, Lebanon; 22 July 2008)
- Biggest win
- Lebanon 10 – 34 United Arab Emirates (Bhamdoun, Lebanon; 29 June 2009)
- Biggest defeat
- Lebanon 48 – 18 United Arab Emirates (Bhamdoun, Lebanon; 22 July 2008)
- World Cup
- Appearances: 0

The United Arab Emirates Rugby League team (nicknamed The Falcons) represented the United Arab Emirates in the sport of rugby league football.

== History ==
The sport of rugby league enjoyed a surge in popularity surrounding the 2008 Rugby League World Cup. As a result, a number of new nations took up the sport. The UAE was an early participant in this trend, playing their first international match in March 2008.

Lacking an established rugby league tradition in the Emirates, the Falcons were initially made up a mixture of natives and expatriates from England, South Africa and other Commonwealth countries. Most notable amongst these was Wayne McDonald, former captain of the Scotland national team and player in the Super League in Europe.

From November 2007, Sol Mokdad was the Director of Development of the Emirates Rugby League.

=== Sol Mokdad arrest ===
In 2015, it was announced that UAE Rugby League was planning a bid to host the 2021 Rugby League World Cup. The organization also secured a sponsorship with Nissan for the fledgling four-team UAE Rugby League Cup. On April 23, 2015, it was announced that the competition had been ordered to drop all references to "UAE Rugby" at the behest of the UAE Rugby Federation, who, as the recognized body for rugby union, claimed sovereignty over all variations and designations of "rugby" in the UAE - UAE Rugby League was subsequently renamed "Rugby League Commission".

On May 8, 2015, it was announced that Mokdad had been arrested at the behest of UAE Rugby Federation authorities for “unauthorised representation of the UAE sovereignty”. It was also alleged by the UAE Rugby Federation that Mokdad was an illegal immigrant.

The RLIF responded by meeting with UAE government officials in order to attempt to clarify the status of rugby league as a distinct sport from rugby union and to end the legal proceedings against Mokdad.

On May 20, Mokdad was released from prison and the charges brought by the UAERF dropped on the condition that he signed a document stating that he would have no future involvement in the administration of rugby league. In the meantime, the UAERF claimed ownership of rugby league and organized a rearranged date for the final of the Rugby League Cup, but the two finalists (Abu Dhabi Harlequins and Xodus Wasps) declined to participate, forcing the cancellation of the competition. On May 25, Mokdad was forced by the UAERF to issue a public statement relinquishing control of the sport to them and apologising and admitting his 'guilt' in organising a rugby league competition. UAE's affiliate membership of the Rugby League European Federation was cancelled on the same day.

== International Results ==
The Falcons' first international series was a three-match series against the Liban Espoir, the Lebanese domestic representative team, in 2009. The first match of the series ended early, after an on-field brawl prompted the referee to call the game off after 56 minutes of play.

2009 Liban Espoir Series

- UAE Falcons 16 - 6 Liban Espoir (Suspended in the 56th minute) - Dubai, UAE - (4 July 2009)
- UAE Falcons 34 - 10 Liban Espoir - Dubai, UAE - (25 July 2009)
- Liban Espoir v. UAE Falcons - Lebanon - (15 August 2009)

2012 Tariq Niazi Cup

- UAE Falcons 30 - 26 Pakistan - Dubai, UAE - (30 March 2012)

Team	P	W	D	L
Liban Espoir	2	0	0	2
UAE Falcons	2	2	0	0
