= Rugby league in Lebanon =

- Country: Lebanon
- Governing body: Lebanese Rugby League Federation
- National team: Lebanon
- Nickname: the Cedars
- First played: 2002

National competitions
- Rugby League World Cup

Club competitions
- Lebanon Rugby League Championship

The seeds of rugby league in Lebanon lie in Australia. A group of Australian-born rugby league players with Lebanese heritage, mostly from inner-city Sydney formed a team with a view to entering the 2000 Rugby League World Cup. They were accepted into the qualifying tournament on the agreement that they would aim to develop rugby league within the country they represent. They subsequently went on to win the qualifying competition, earning their place by defeating Italy and Morocco of the Mediterranean group before travelling to Florida to defeat the USA, winners of the Pacific group.

In 2002, a domestic league was set up in Lebanon, initially with four university-based teams. Players from the domestic competition now feature in the national team. A team composed entirely from Lebanese domestic players, known as Lebanon Espoirs has been formed.

In 2011, Lebanon nearly qualified for 2013 Rugby League World Cup but lost to Italy who became the 14th and final nation to qualify for the event.

In 2011, the government of Lebanon promised to increase its support and funding for rugby league.

== Governing body and competitions ==
The Lebanese Rugby League Federation is based in Safra, Lebanon. It is an associate members of the Rugby League European Federation and a full member of the Rugby League International Federation.

== Lebanon Rugby League Championship ==
There are eight teams that play in the Bank of Beirut Lebanon Championship domestic league.

Name	Location	Full Name
Tripoli City	Tripoli	Tripoli Rugby League Football Club
Redbacks	Beirut	Redbacks Rugby League Football Club
Wolves	Rabieh	Wolves Rugby League Football Club
Jounieh Al-Galacticos	Jounieh	Jounieh Al-Galacticos Rugby League Football Club
LAU Immortals	Beirut	Lebanese American University Immortals Rugby League Football Club
El Mina RLFC	Tripoli	Started as a ghost club; only played 2 seasons - never won a game
USJ Saints	Beirut	Université Saint-Joseph Saints Rugby League Football Club
Balamand Razorbacks	Koura	Balamand Razorbacks Rugby League Football Club
AUST Lions	Beirut	American University of Science and Technology Lions Rugby League Football Club
L.I.U Eagles	Tripoli	Lebanese International University Eagles Rugby League Football Club

== Media ==
Media representation of rugby league has grown dramatically with the domestic competition now covered by all ten marquee Lebanese newspapers, two prominent radio stations and the country's major television stations.

== The National Team ==
The Lebanon national rugby league team, nicknamed the Cedars, remains mostly composed of players of Lebanese ancestry from Australia. The Lebanon Espoirs team, made up of younger players from the domestic competition, has played a number of fixtures - this team has competed annually in the Rugby League Mediterranean Cup, which is hosted in Lebanon. Many of the Espoirs players have gone into represent Lebanon in full international matches. The team qualified and played in the 2017 Rugby League World Cup, winning their first ever world cup game against France in the qualifying group stage which resulted in the team competing in the quarter-finals. The Cedars lost the quarter-finals to Tonga 24- 22.

== Liban Espoir ==
Since the creation of a five-team domestic league in Lebanon in 2003, a second team was formed made up of players from that league under Head Coach Remond Safi. They are known as the Liban Espoir and regularly tour other countries. In 2003 the team toured Morocco. In 2005 they toured England and Wales, playing numerous matches against the England Lionhearts, Welsh Presidents XIII and Rugby League Conference teams. In 2006 they recorded their first victory on tour in Cyprus against a British combined services team. In 2007 they beat the main Serbian national team 16-14 and went on to defeat a Serbia Development XIII 50–0. In 2008 they played the United Arab Emirates of the Emirates Rugby League, the first game ever to be played by the nation. The match was played in Bhamdoun with the Liban Espoir eventually winning 48–18. In 2009, Liban Espoir played the UAE Falcons in a three-game series. The first game, played in Dubai at The Sevens stadium ended early with the UAE Falcons leading 16-6 because of a mass brawl. The remaining two games were played at The Sevens and Bhamdoun. In the second game, at The Sevens, The Espoirs were defeated 34–10.

== Touch Football ==
The Lebanon national touch football team debuted in 1999.
