= Zhang Zhiqiang (rugby union) =

- Born: December 15, 1974 (age 51) Zibo, China
- Height: 1.80 m (5 ft 11 in)
- Weight: 88 kg (13.9 st; 194 lb)

Rugby union career
- Position: Fly-half
Amateur team(s)
Years	Team	Apps	(Points)
1993-	China Agricultural University		
1998-99	Aberdeen RFC (Hong Kong)		
2000-01	Sunnybank		
Senior career
Years	Team	Apps	(Points)
2003-2004	Leicester Tigers		
International career
Years	Team	Apps	(Points)
1998–present	China		
National sevens team
Years	Team		Comps
- China 7s

Zhang Zhiqiang (Chinese: 张 志强, born 15 December 1978 in Zibo, Shandong) is a Chinese Rugby union player who plays at the fly-half position.

Zhiqiang is considered the greatest Chinese Rugby player of all time. He plays for the China Agricultural University (CAU) club in Beijing, and prior to this, he had a stint with the Leicester Tigers during the 2003-04 Premiership season. He plays with the China national team as well as with the China sevens national team.
