= Matt Saunders (rugby union, born 1988) =

Filipino rugby union player (born 1988)

- Born: Matthew Donato Saunders; 6 July 1988 (age 38)
- Height: 1.76 m (5 ft 9 1/2 in)
- Weight: 90 kg (200 lb; 14 st 2 lb)

Rugby union career
- Position: Outside center
- Current team: Kubota Spears
Senior career
Years	Team	Apps	(Points)
- Sydney Roosters
2012−2015	NTT Communications Shining Arcs	17	(30)
2015−	Kubota Spears	13	(30)
- Correct as of 15 January 2017
International career
Years	Team	Apps	(Points)
	Philippines		(50)
National sevens team
Years	Team		Comps
- Philippines

Matt Saunders is a rugby union player for the Philippines national rugby union team. His rugby union position is at outside center. He is the top try scorer in the Philippines. Saunders is a former professional rugby league footballer with Sydney Roosters and rugby union footballer for Kubota Spears.

== Personal life ==
He was born in the United Kingdom to a British father and a Filipina mother who hails from Pangasinan. He has three other siblings Oliver Benjamin and sister Abigail.

Prior to his stint as a professional rugby league and rugby union footballer, he studied as an electrician in Australia and is qualified to practice the profession.
