= Oliver Saunders =

Filipino rugby union player (born 1986)

- Born: March 23, 1986 (age 40)
- Height: 5 ft 10 in (1.78 m)
- Weight: 190 lb (86 kg; 14 st)

Rugby union career
- Position: Fly-half
Senior career
Years	Team	Apps	(Points)
2012 -	NTT Communications Shining Arcs		
International career
Years	Team	Apps	(Points)
2008-	Philippines	21	(179)
National sevens team
Years	Team		Comps
2007-	Philippines 7s		7

Oliver Saunders (born 23 March 1986) is an Australian–Filipino rugby union footballer for the Philippines national rugby union team where his position is at fly half. Saunders is a former professional rugby league footballer with Norths in the Jersey Flegg Cup. He is one of the leading try-scores in the Philippines team. Oliver is brothers with fellow Philippines players Matt Saunders and Benjamin Saunders. In 2011, he and his brother Matt signed to the NTT Communications Shining Arcs for the 2012/2013 season of the Japanese Top League competition.

== Personal life ==
He was born in the United Kingdom with a British father and a Filipina mother from Pangasinan. He has two younger brothers Matt and Benjamin.
