= Kim Kwang-min (footballer, born 1985) =

South Korean footballer

Personal information
- Date of birth: 25 December 1985 (age 40)
- Place of birth: South Korea
- Height: 1.82 m (5 ft 11 1/2 in)
- Position: Defender

Team information
- Current team: Duhok SC

Youth career
- 2001–2003: Gaesung High School

Senior career*
Years	Team	Apps	(Gls)
2004–2008	Suwon City		
2008–2009	Fagiano Okayama	22	(1)
2011–2013	Fukushima United FC	?	(?)
2013	Duhok SC	3	
- * Club domestic league appearances and goals as of 5 October 2009

- Kim Kwang-min
- Hangul: 김광민
- Hanja: 金廣閔
- RR: Gim Gwangmin
- MR: Kim Kwangmin

Kim Kwang-min (Korean: 김광민; born 25 December 1985) is a South Korean football defender, who plays for Duhok SC in Iraqi Premier League.

== Club statistics ==
Club performance			League		Cup		Total	
Season	Club	League	Apps	Goals	Apps	Goals	Apps	Goals
Japan			League		Emperor's Cup		Total	
2008	Fagiano Okayama	Football League	4	0	2	1	6	1
2009	Fagiano Okayama	J2 League	18	1	0	0	18	1
Country	Japan		22	1	2	1	24	2
Total			22	1	2	1	24	2
