= Gareth Holgate =

Welsh-born Filipino rugby union player (born 1987)

- Born: Gareth Leslie Holgate; 3 December 1987 (age 38) St Asaph, Wales
- Height: 1.80 m (5 ft 11 in)
- Weight: 85 kg (13 st 5 lb)
- School: Rydal Penrhos
- University: UWIC

Rugby union career
- Position(s): Centre, Fly-half
- Current team: Kyuden Voltex
Amateur team(s)
Years	Team	Apps	(Points)
- Rhyl
2007–2010	UWIC		
2010	RGC 1404		
Senior career
Years	Team	Apps	(Points)
2010–2011	Rugby Badia	18	(35)
2011–	Kyuden Voltex	0	(0)
International career
Years	Team	Apps	(Points)
2006	Philippines	9	(30)
2007–	Philippines U19		
National sevens team
Years	Team		Comps
2007–	Philippines		

Gareth Leslie "Gaz" Holgate (born 3 December 1987) is a Welsh-born Philippine international rugby union player. Born in St Asaph, Denbighshire, Holgate currently plays for Japanese club Kyuden Voltex. His primary position is as a centre, but he can also play as a fly-half.

== Career ==
=== Early years ===
Born in St Asaph, Denbighshire, to a Filipina mother and an English father, Holgate grew up in Gwaenysgor, near Prestatyn, and attended Rydal Penrhos in Colwyn Bay. While also playing for the school team, he began his rugby career with Rhyl and District RFC and played for them until he moved to Cardiff in 2007 to study at UWIC.

=== UWIC RFC ===
While at UWIC, Holgate played for the university rugby team, UWIC RFC, in the WRU Division One East. After a short time with UWIC, Holgate received a call-up to the Philippines rugby sevens team for the 2007 SEA Games in December 2007, having qualified by virtue of his mother's Filipina heritage. The team reached the final, but lost 29–14 to the hosts, Thailand. This was soon followed by appearances for the Philippines national XV in the inaugural Asian Five Nations tournament in July 2008; he scored a try in the team's 101–0 win over Brunei and also played in a 20–8 win over Guam as the Philippines won the Pacific-Asia division. He played again in the 2009 Asian Five Nations, but suffered an ankle injury in the Division 3 semi-final against Iran that kept him out of the 25–0 win over Guam in the final. The 2010 Asian Five Nations saw Holgate compete for the Philippines in Division II. He played on the wing in the 53–33 semi-final win over Thailand, before the Philippines went on to beat the hosts, India, 34–12 in the final to secure promotion to Division I.

=== Zhermack Badia ===
Holgate graduated from UWIC in 2010 and subsequently signed for Zhermack Badia of Serie A, the second tier of rugby in Italy. During the 2010–11 season, he scored seven tries in 18 appearances. The season culminated with Holgate being named in the Philippines squad for the 2011 Asian Five Nations Division I in Ansan, South Korea. He played at outside centre in the semi-final against South Korea, but despite a good performance, he was unable to prevent a 34–20 defeat. However, in the third-place play-off against Malaysia, Holgate scored a hat-trick of tries as the Philippines secured an 86–20 win to retain their Division I status for the 2012 tournament.

=== Kyuden Voltex ===
After a year in Italy, Holgate signed for Japanese club Kyuden Voltex, who, at the time, played in the second tier of Japanese rugby. He made his debut in a 22–7 friendly win over Meiji University on 12 June 2011.

Holgate was part of the Philippines Sevens team that qualified for the 2013 Rugby World Cup Sevens tournament in Moscow, their first appearance in the tournament. After a three-week training camp, Holgate was named in the Philippines final 12-man squad for the tournament. Holgate played in all three of the Philippines' Pool C matches against Kenya, Samoa and Zimbabwe, making history against Kenya by scoring the Philippines' first ever try in the competition.
