= Dinesvaran Krishnan =

Malaysian rugby union player

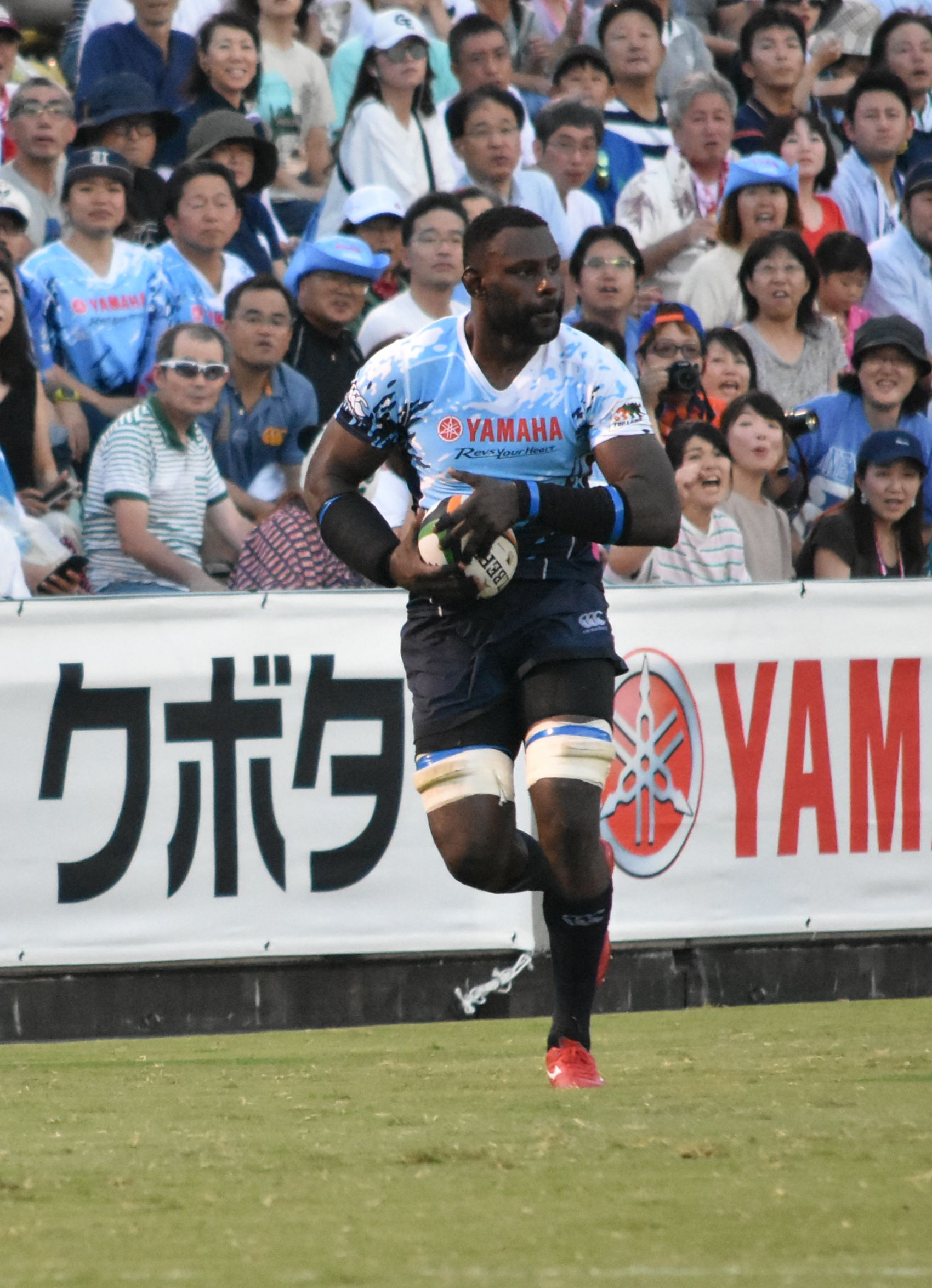
- Full name: Dinesvaran Krishnan
- Born: 22 May 1988 (age 38) Malaysia
- Height: 1.95 m (6 ft 5 in)
- Weight: 120 kg (18 st 13 lb; 260 lb)

Rugby union career
- Position: Lock
Senior career
Years	Team	Apps	(Points)
2013–2019	Yamaha Júbilo	72	(60)
2020–2022	Hino Red Dolphins	20	(10)
2023	Chicago Hounds (rugby union)		

Dinesvaran Krishnan (ヂネスヴアラン クリシナン, Krishnan Dinesvaran; born 5 May 1988) is a Malaysian rugby union player who plays as a Lock. He currently plays for the Chicago Hounds of Major League Rugby (MLR) in the U.S. He had previously played for the Hino Red Dolphins.
