= Tomoki Kitagawa =

Japanese rugby union player

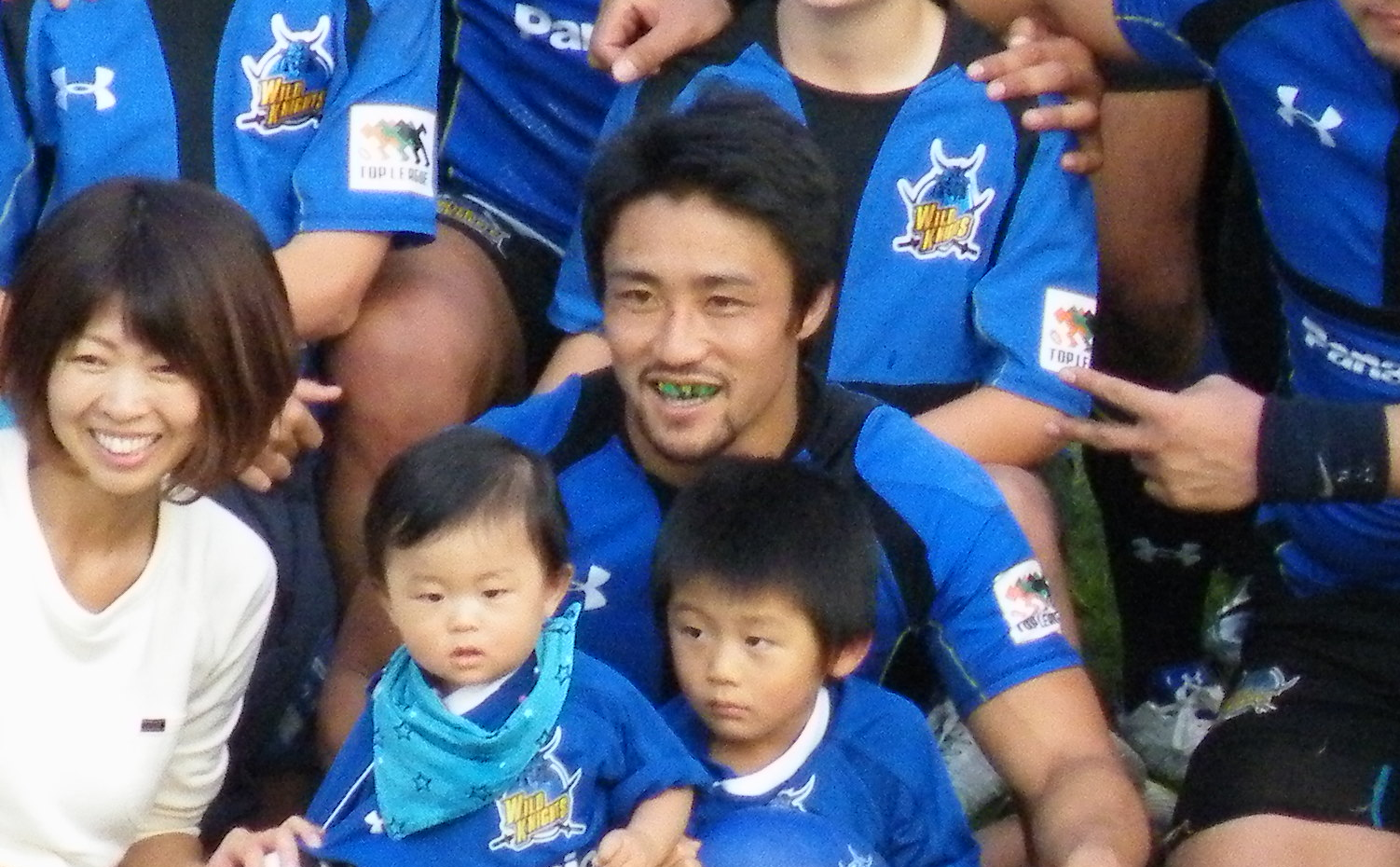
- Full name: Tomoki Kitagawa
- Born: 25 July 1983 (age 43) Japan
- Height: 1.75 m (5 ft 9 in)
- Weight: 80 kg (12 st 8 lb; 180 lb)

Rugby union career
- Position: Wing
Senior career
| Years | Team | Apps | (Points) |
| 2010–2017 | Panasonic Wild Knights | 88 | (250) |
- Correct as of 6 May 2021
International career
| Years | Team | Apps | (Points) |
| 2006–2007 | Japan | 3 | (10) |
- Correct as of 6 May 2021

Tomoki Kitagawa (北川智規, Kitagawa tomoki; born 25 July 1983) is a former Japanese rugby union player who played as a wing. He spent his whole career playing for Panasonic Wild Knights in Japan's domestic Top League, playing over 80 times. He was named as a replacement in the Japan squad for the 2007 Rugby World Cup, making 1 appearances in the tournament. He made a further 2 appearances for Japan in his career, scoring two tries.
