= Kenneth Stern (rugby union) =

Filipino-American rugby player

- Born: Kenneth Mitchell Stern; 21 May 1988 (age 38) Stamford, CT, United States
- Height: 5 ft 8 in (1.73 m)
- Weight: 170 lb (77 kg; 12 st)
- University: Boston University (2010)

Rugby union career
- Position: Wing
Amateur team(s)
Years	Team	Apps	(Points)
- Village Lions (New York City)
–	Gordon RFC (Sydney, Australia)		
International career
Years	Team	Apps	(Points)
2009–	Philippines		
National sevens team
Years	Team		Comps
2010–	Philippines 7s		

Kenneth Mitchell Stern (born 21 May 1988) is a Filipino-American rugby union player for the Philippines national rugby union team, nicknamed the "Volcanoes". He has represented the Philippines in both rugby fifteens and sevens. His primary position is wing.

== Collegiate career ==
Originally from Quezon, Stern's family emigrated to Stamford, Connecticut, where he attended Fairfield College Preparatory School in nearby Fairfield, Connecticut. He graduated from Boston University in 2010, where he was a member of the rugby team. His collegiate rugby honors included New England Rugby Football Union All-Stars, the Northeast Collegiate All-Stars and the All-American 7s Team.

Stern was also a member of the New England Immortals rugby league select side that beat Canada in 2010.

== National team career ==
Stern made his International debut for the Philippines in the 2009 Asian Five Nations tournament, where the Philippines earned a promotion to Division 2 by beating Iran and Guam. In 2010, he was a member of the Volcano squad who took home the shield, scoring two tries in a 34–12 win over India helping the Philippines to their second promotion in as many years. Stern would continue to play at wing with the Volcanoes in 2011, including a test match against Hong Kong, and again in 2012, helping the Philippines get yet another promotion to the A5N Top 5.

Stern also represented the Philippines in rugby sevens, including the Volcanoes first ever World Cup appearance in the 2013 Rugby World Cup Sevens held in Moscow, Russia. He also was a member of the 2014 Asian Games squad in Incheon, South Korea.

== Personal life ==
Aside from rugby, Stern has also had a successful modeling career, appearing in such publications as Cosmopolitan in both the United States and the Philippines, receiving "Hunk of the Month" honors in the December 2011 issue and was named a finalist in the 2011 "Cosmo Bachelor of the Year" poll. His sister Elizabeth Mae Stern was the former Philippine figure skating national champion and an Olympic hopeful.
