= Salom Yiu =

Hong Kong rugby union player

Salom Yiu Kam Shing MH
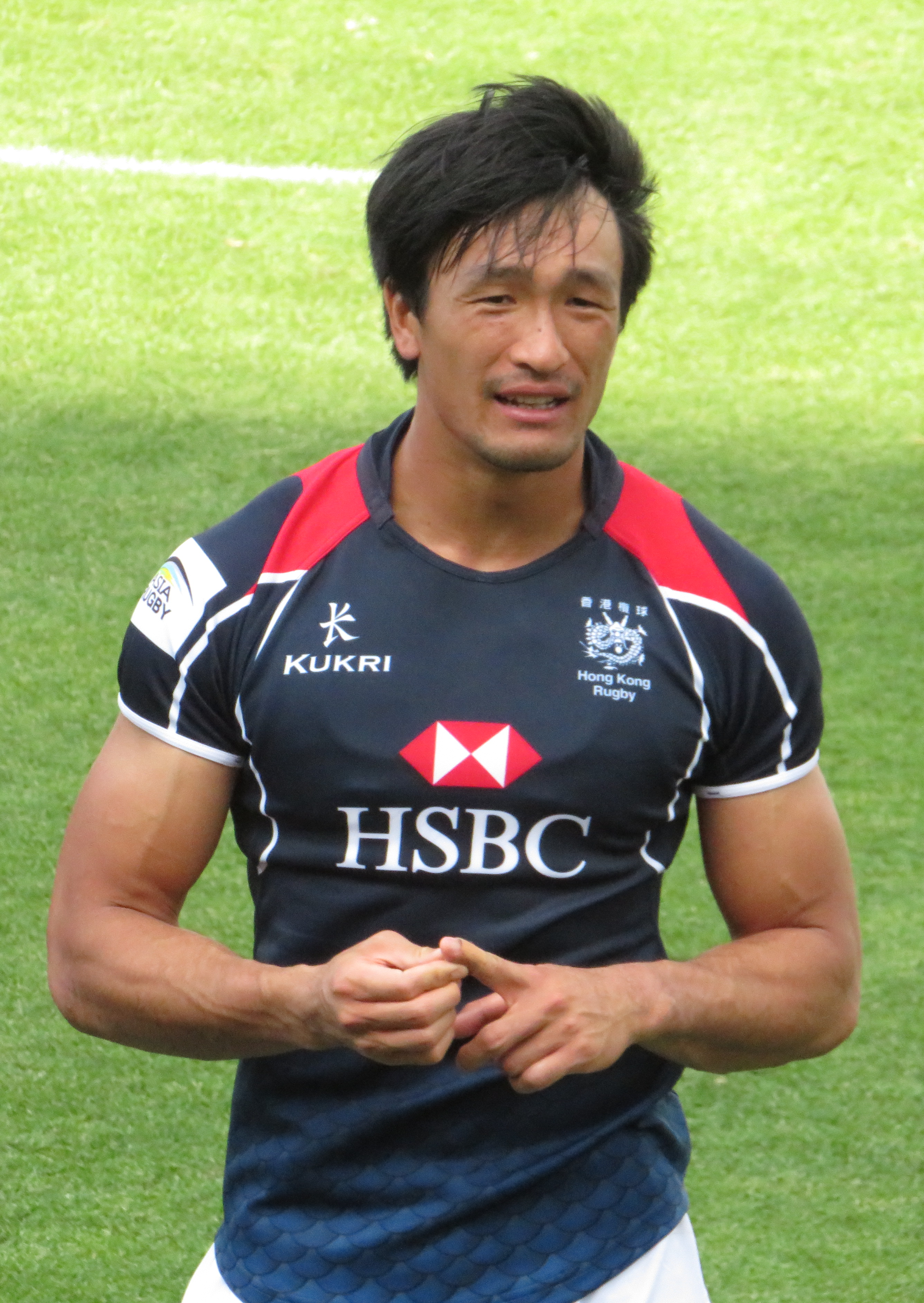

Personal information
- Born: 4 February 1988 (age 38) Guangdong, China
- Height: 1.84 m (6 ft 1/2 in)
- Weight: 82 kg (181 lb)

Sport
- Country: Hong Kong
- Sport: Men's Rugby union
- Position: Wing
Medal record
National Games of China
Silver medal – second place	2013 Liaoning	Men's Rugby Sevens
Asian Games
Gold medal – first place	2018 Jakarta	Men's Rugby Sevens
Gold medal – first place	2022 Hangzhou	Men's Rugby Sevens
Silver medal – second place	2010 Guangzhou	Men's Rugby Sevens
Silver medal – second place	2014 Incheon	Men's Rugby Sevens
East Asian Games
Silver medal – second place	2009 Hong Kong	Men's Rugby Sevens

Salom Yiu Kam Shing MH (Chinese: 姚錦成; born 4 February 1988) is a Hong Kong rugby union player. He plays for USRC Tigers RFC, the Hong Kong Rugby Sevens team and the Hong Kong national rugby union team.

He has also represented Hong Kong China Rugby at fifteen a-side rugby, gaining 49 caps. He made his debut on 16 December 2009 in a 17-5 loss to The Czech Republic in Prague. If he had not been unavailable due to his Sevens rugby commitments, he would have played over 80 games for Hong Kong.

== Career ==
Salom Yiu started his career after first watching the Hong Kong Sevens from the spectator stands and then doing more research on the sport. He was a member of the Hong Kong Rugby Sevens team at the 2009 East Asian Games. He was a Silver medal winner at both the 2009 East Asian Games and the 2010 Asian Games, falling both times to Japan. He became a full-time professional when Rugby Sevens became the first team sport admitted to the Hong Kong Sports Institute in April 2013.

In 2022, He competed for Hong Kong at the Rugby World Cup Sevens in Cape Town.

	Total Caps	Debut	Date
Fifteens Caps	49	Vs Czech Republic lost 17-5	16-Dec-2009
