= Kim Gwong-min =

South Korean rugby sevens player

- Born: 2 April 1988 (age 38)
- Height: 1.77 m (5 ft 10 in)
- Weight: 82 kg (181 lb)

Rugby union career
- Position: Wing
International career
Years	Team	Apps	(Points)
2008	South Korea U-20		(0)
	South Korea		(0)
National sevens team
Years	Team		Comps
- South Korea 7s
- Correct as of 01 August 2021

Kim Gwong-min (born 2 April 1988) is a South Korean rugby player. He competed for South Korea at the 2020 Summer Olympics.

== Rugby career ==
Kim represented South Korea's national under-20 rugby union team at the 2008 IRB Junior World Rugby Trophy in Chile. In 2011, he was named MVP of the Shanghai Sevens, he scored the winning try and completed a hat-trick in the tournament final of the Asia Rugby Sevens Series.

He competed for South Korea in the men's sevens tournament at the 2020 Summer Olympics in Tokyo.

He captained the South Korean fifteens side at the 2022 Asia Rugby Championship. Later in September, he represented the sevens side at the World Cup in Cape Town, South Africa.
