= Sport in Slovakia =

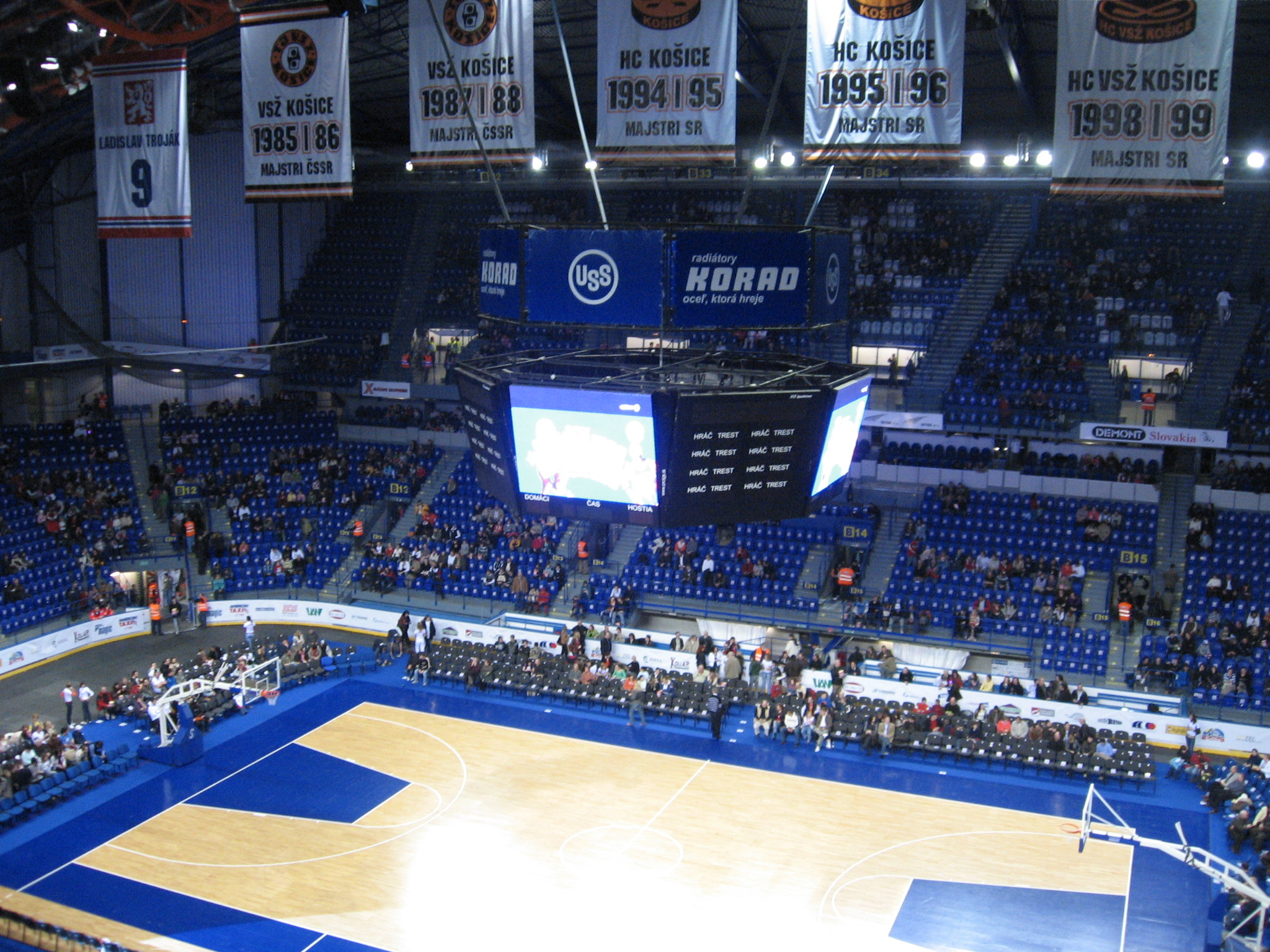
Steel Aréna in Košice hosting a basketball match

Sport in Slovakia is influenced by its climate and geography; popular summer sports include football (soccer), tennis, volleyball, swimming, cycling and hiking, popular winter sports include ice hockey, skiing and snowboarding. The most watched sports in Slovakia are football, ice hockey and tennis. Internationally, the most successful sport in Slovakia is ice hockey where currently, as of 2022, the country is ranked as the eighth best team in the world by the IIHF World Ranking.

== History ==
Until revolution in 1989, the sport sector was highly centralized, oriented on a unified, nationwide programme of sports. In 1990 the Act No.173/1990 was adopted by the Federal Assembly of Czech and Slovak Federative Republic, which replaced the Act No. 68/1956 on Organisation Physical Education. Also in 1990, the National Council of the Slovak Republic approved the Act on Physical Culture No. 198/1990.

In 1997 the new Slovak National Council Act No. 288/1997 on Physical Culture was approved, which also included articles on educational and commercial activities in sport. By passing the Act on State Funding of Physical Culture No. 264/1993 the Slovak National Council approved financing of sport through lottery funds in 1993.

In 2024 the Slovak government established new Ministry of Tourism and Sports of the Slovak Republic with the former Director of Bratislava Airport Dušan Keketi as the first minister of Tourism and Sport.

== Description ==
In 2011, there were over 13,000 sporting clubs and 661,346 registered sportsmen in the country. The most successful sporting club is Vojenské športové centrum DUKLA Banská Bystrica with 31 different medals in the year 2011.

== Team sports ==
=== Ice hockey ===
Ice hockey
- Country: Slovakia
- Governing body: Slovak Ice Hockey Federation
- National team: Slovakia
- First played: 1920s
- Registered players: 8,280
- Clubs: 820

National competitions
- Tipsport Extraliga, 1.liga, 2.liga

International competitions
- IIHF World Championships

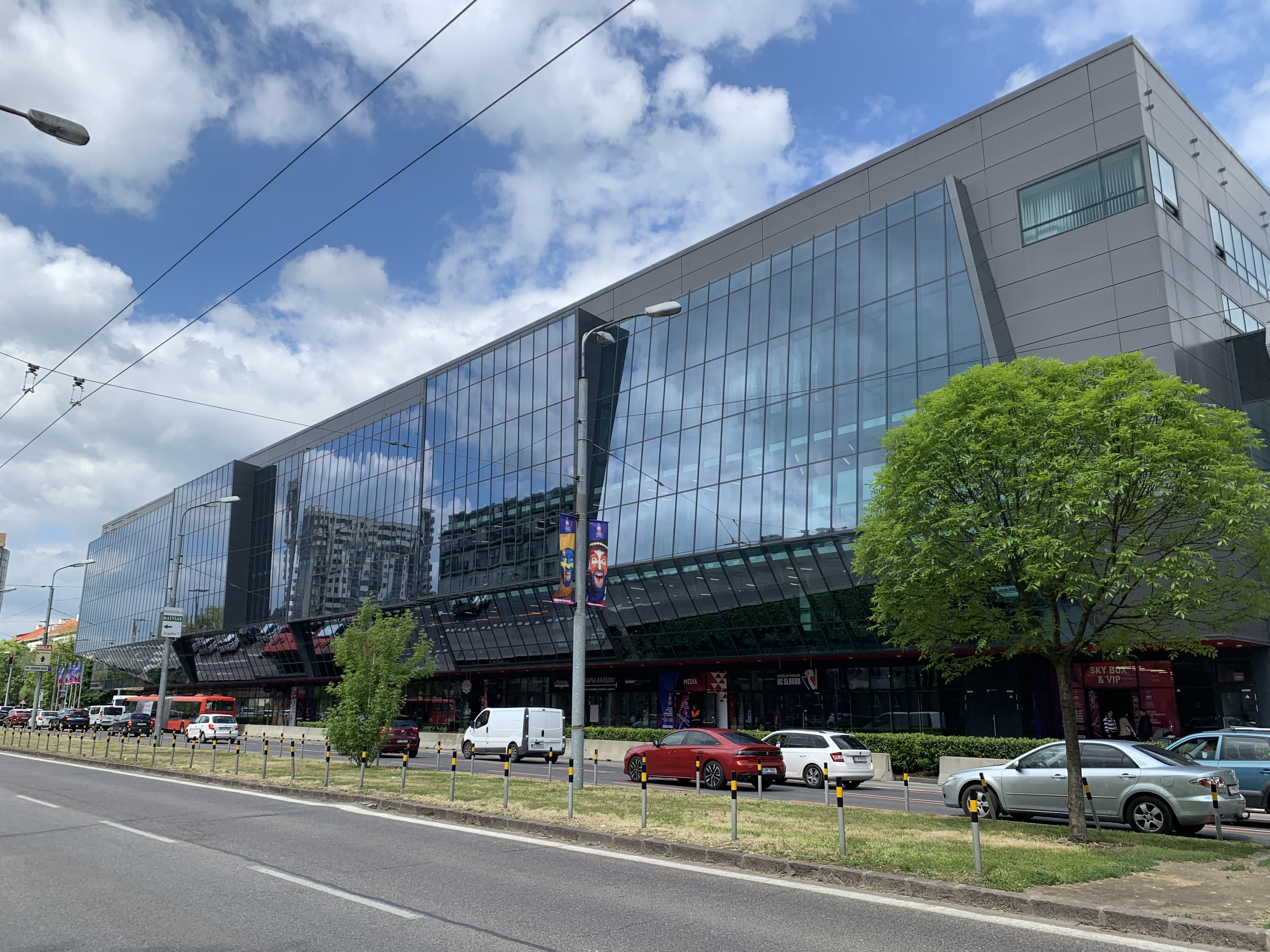
Ondrej Nepela Arena, the premier ice hockey stadium in the country located in Bratislava

After the dissolution of Czechoslovakia, Slovak national ice hockey team started competing in Group C (lowest tier) of IIHF World Championships. After winning Group C in 1994 and Group B in 1995 Slovakia was promoted to Group A for 1996 World Championship. Since then, Slovak hockey team has won one gold medal in 2002, two silver medals (in 2000 and 2012) and one bronze medal in 2003.

Slovakia has had many players in the NHL. From the Czechoslovak era, the most famous are Stan Mikita and Peter Šťastný. Since the Velvet revolution there have been much more Slovak players in the NHL, such as Peter Bondra, Marián Hossa, Pavol Demitra or Zdeno Chára. Up to now, there have been 10 Slovak players that have won the Stanley Cup:

- Stan Mikita (1): 1961
- Jiří Bicek (1): 2003
- Martin Cibák (1): 2004
- Tomáš Kopecký (2): 2008, 2010,
- Miroslav Šatan (1): 2009
- Marián Hossa (3): 2010, 2013, 2015
- Zdeno Chára (1): 2011
- Michal Handzuš (1): 2013
- Marián Gáborík (1): 2014
- Erik Černák (1): 2020

In addition to the players in NHL, many Slovaks play in various leagues all over Europe, most of them in international KHL. As of 2012–13 season, there are 50 Slovak players playing in KHL, which is due to a Slovak team HC Slovan Bratislava competing in this league.

There are also three national hockey leagues in Slovakia, with Tipsport Extraliga being the top tier of the system. Most league titles (8) were won by HC Slovan Bratislava.

Slovakia also organized the 2011 IIHF World Championship, which was won by Finland. The venues were Bratislava and Košice and all matches attracted 406,804 visitors.

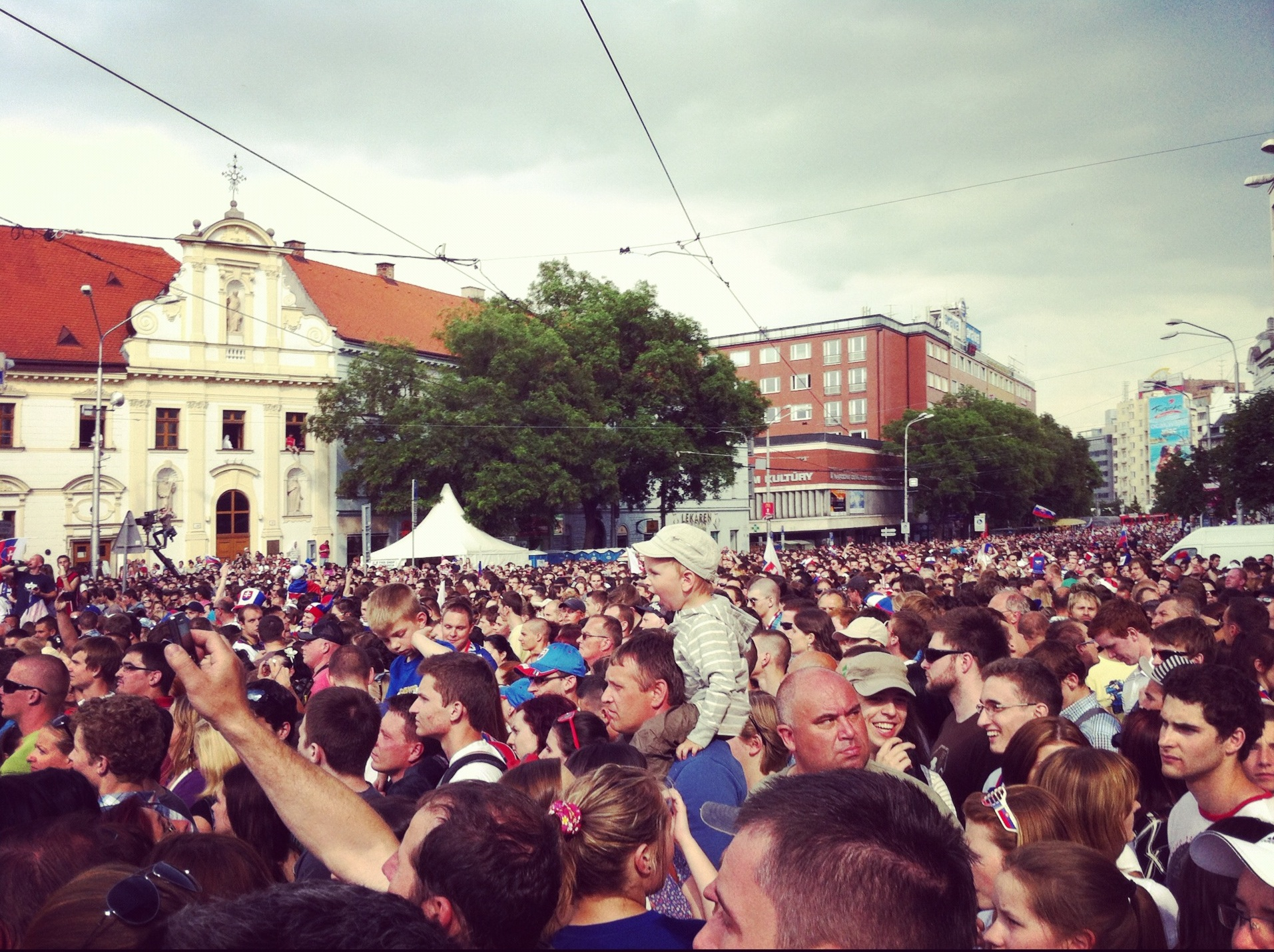
Fans welcoming Slovak national hockey team after returning from 2012 IIHF World Championship, where they won silver medals

Ice hockey is probably the most popular sport in Slovakia. After finishing 2nd in 2012 IIHF World Championship a cheering crowd of tens of thousands people greeted the national team players on SNP Square in Bratislava, which exemplifies the popularity of this sport in the country.

=== Football ===
Football
- Country: Slovakia
- Governing body: Slovak Football Association
- National team: Slovakia
- First played: 1898
- Registered players: 428,968 (2010)
- Clubs: 2,432 (2010)

National competitions
- Niké liga, Slovnaft Cup

Club competitions
- UEFA Champions League, UEFA Europa League

International competitions
- FIFA World Cup, UEFA European Championship

Association football is the most popular sport in Slovakia, with over 400 thousand registered players. Since 1993, Slovak national football team has qualified once to the FIFA World Cup and once to the UEFA European Championship, In 2010, they proceeded into Play-offs, where they were defeated by Netherlands, The most notable result was the 3–2 victory over Italy. In 2016, they lost to Germany Germany National Football Team in the Round of 16.

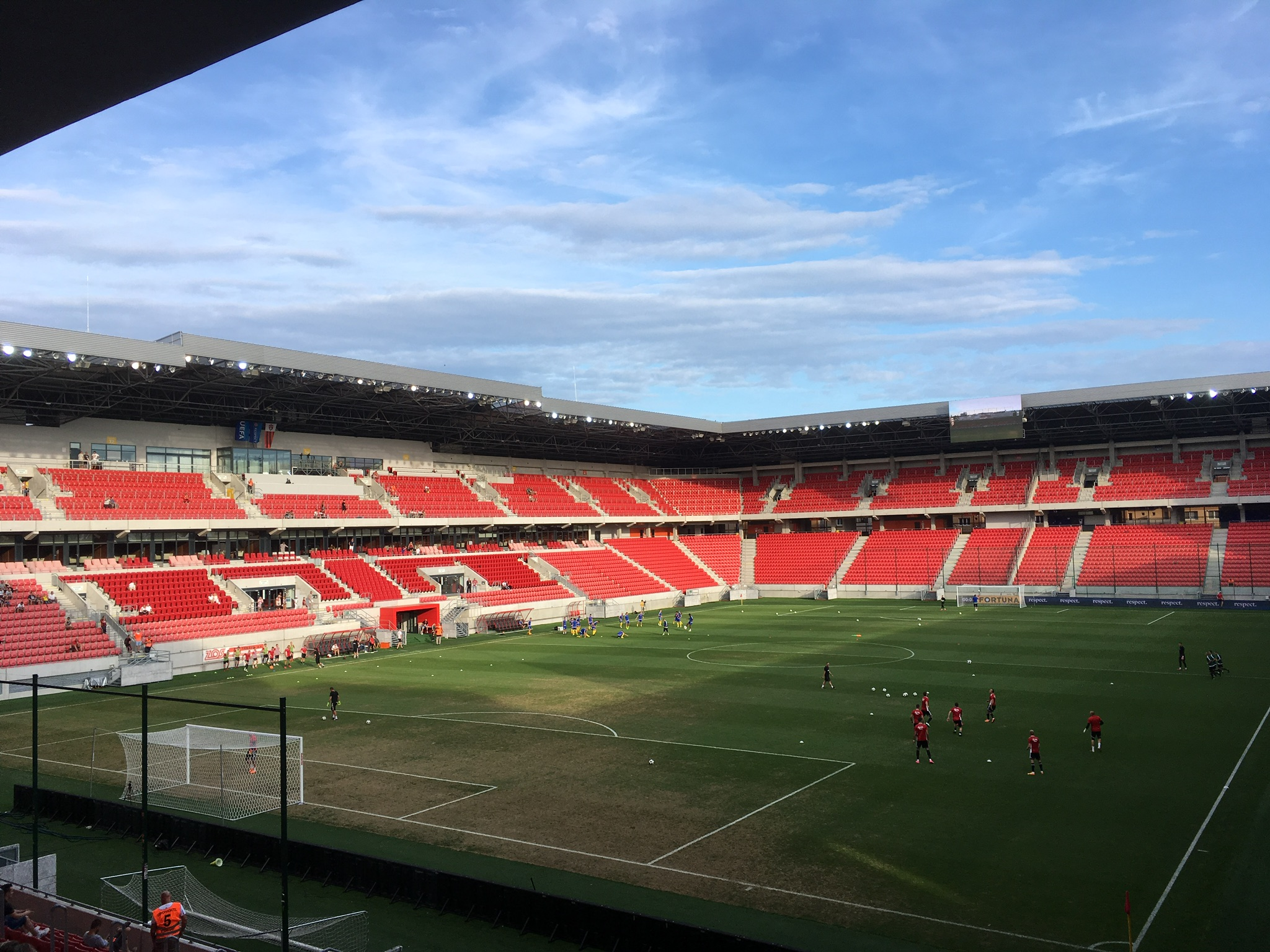
Anton Malatinský Stadium home to Spartak Trnava. (2018)

In club competitions, only three teams have qualified to UEFA Champions League Group Stage, namely MFK Košice in 1997–98, FC Artmedia Bratislava in 2005–06 season and MŠK Žilina in 2010–11. FC Artmedia Bratislava has been the most successful team after finishing 3rd in Group Stage and therefore qualifying to Round of 32 of UEFA Cup. They also remain as the only Slovak club that has won a match in Group stage.

During Czechoslovak era the most notable result of a Slovak club was Slovan Bratislava's victory in 1968–69 European Cup Winners' Cup against FC Barcelona.

The most famous Slovak players are: Marek Hamšík, Martin Škrtel, Juraj Kucka, Peter Dubovský and Jozef Adamec.

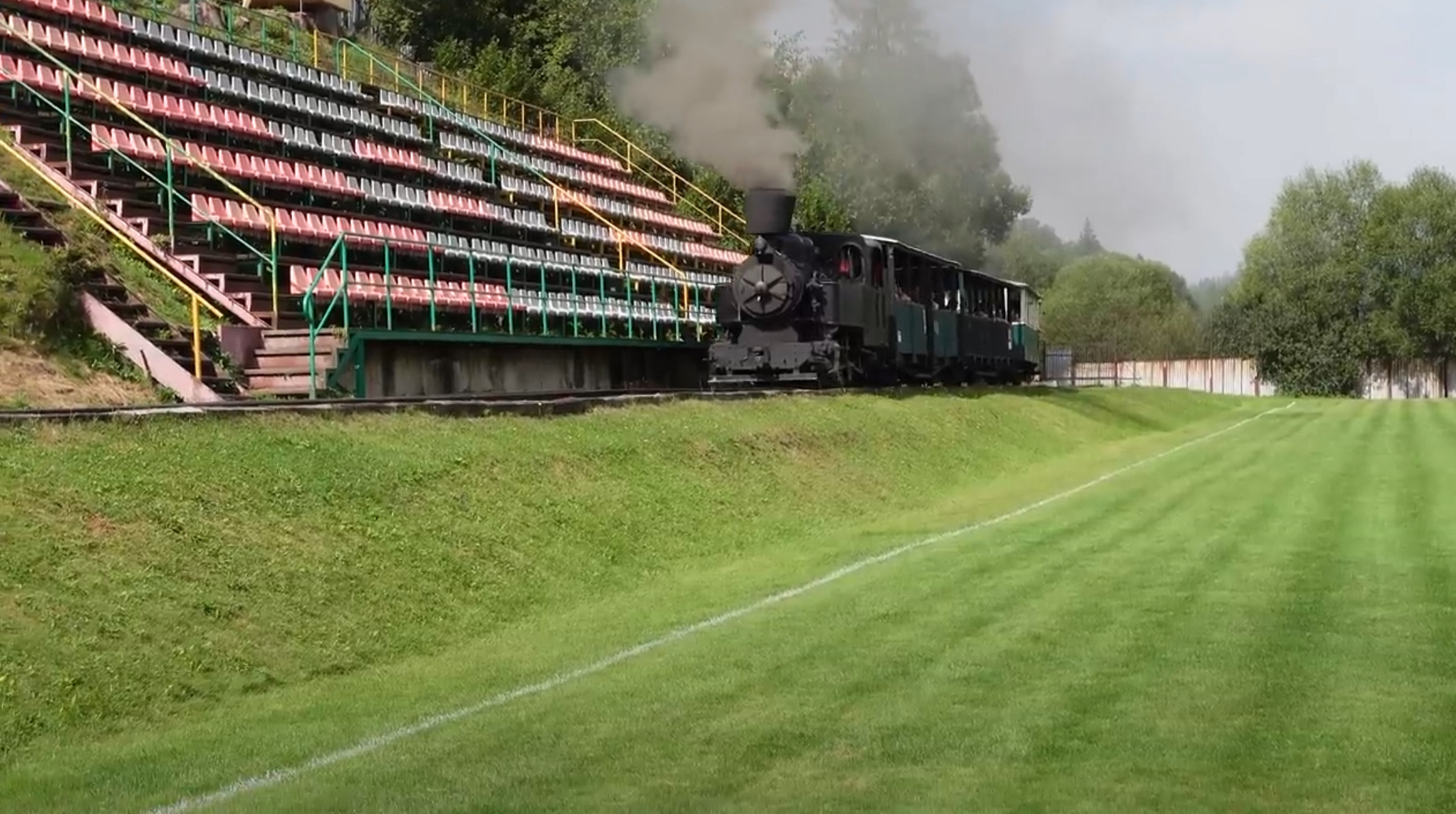
The train passing by the stadium.

In 2015, the Tatran Čierny Balog stadium gained international recognition following the viral spread of a short video clip that depicted a train entering the ground. The stadium is home to amateur 6. Liga club TJ Tatran Čierny Balog.

=== Basketball ===
Basketball in Slovakia is governed by the Slovak Basketball Association (Slovenská basketbalová asociácia), which was created in 1993. However, Slovak basketball dates to 1919.

The highest tier of both men and women basketball league is called Extraliga, which is played by 11 male teams and 8 female teams (as of 2017). The most successful men's teams are Basketbal Pezinok with 7 wins, BC Prievidza and BK Inter Bratislava. To most successful women's teams belong Good Angels Košice with 12 consecutive and MBK Ružomberok with 11 wins.

Slovakia national basketball team has so far never qualified for any Olympic Games, world or European championships. Women are more successful, they have participated once at the 2000 Olympics, and have gained one silver and one bronze medal at 1997, resp. 1993 EuroBasket.

Most famous slovak basketball players include the coach Natália Hejková, player Zuzana Žirková, Anton Gavel or Radoslav Rančík.

=== Rugby ===
Slovak Rugby Union is the official organization in Slovakia, to promote and organize the rugby. Based in Bratislava, competitions are settled all around the country, divided by two types: rugby 7s and rugby XV. There are ten clubs in Slovakia, including Rugby Klub Bratislava, Trnava, Rugby Union Club Piešťany, Bardejov or Košice.

=== Bandy ===
Bandy is a minor sport, as it has made a return only in 2017. In September Slovakia will debut in the annual international rink bandy tournament in Nymburk, Czech Republic.

== Individual sports ==
=== Whitewater slalom ===
Whitewater slalom is the most successful Olympic sport in modern-day Slovakia with 8 gold, 2 silver and 3 bronze medals since 1993. Furthermore, Slovakia has won 60 medals (25—18—17) at World Championships, 91 medals (45—23—23) at European championships and 35 World Cups since 1993. Apart from winning many World and European Championships, Slovak canoeists collected medals in each Summer Olympic Games since their first appearance in Atlanta 1996. The most famous athletes are Michal Martikán, Pavol Hochschorner/Peter Hochschorner, Ladislav Škantár/Peter Škantár, Elena Kaliská, Jana Dukátová, Alexander Slafkovský and Matej Beňuš.

Athlete	Gender	Category	Atlanta 1996	Sydney 2000	Athens 2004	Beijing 2008	London 2012	Rio 2016
Michal Martikán	male	C-1 (canoe single)	Gold medal	Silver medal	Silver medal	Gold medal	Bronze medal	–
Pavol Hochschorner	male	C-2 (canoe double)	–	Gold medal	Gold medal	Gold medal	Bronze medal	–
Peter Hochschorner	male	C-2	–	Gold medal	Gold medal	Gold medal	Bronze medal	–
Elena Kaliská	female	K-1 (kayak single)	–	–	Gold medal	Gold medal	–	–
Juraj Minčík	male	C-1	–	Bronze medal	–	–	–	–
Matej Beňuš	male	C-1	–	–	–	–	–	Silver medal
Ladislav Škantár	male	C-1	–	–	–	–	–	Gold medal
Peter Škantár	male	C-2	–	–	–	–	–	Gold medal

Table of all medals:

Athlete	Category	Olympic Games	World Championships	World Cup	European championships	World Championships-Team	European championships-Team
Michal Martikán	C-1 (canoe single)	2-2-1	4-3-4	5	4-4-1	11-0-1	10-2-1
Pavol Hochschorner/Peter Hochschorner	C-2 (canoe double)	3-0-1	5-0-2	10	6-2-1	1-4-2	5-0-2
Elena Kaliská	K-1 (kayak single)	2-0-0	1-1-0	6	5-0-1	1-1-1	3-4-3
Ladislav Škantár/Peter Škantár	C-2 (canoe double)	1-0-0	0-2-3	3	3-1-3	1-3-1	4-0-2
Matej Beňuš	C-1 (canoe single)	0-1-0	0-0-1	3	0-1-2	9-0-0	7-0-0
Juraj Minčík	C-1 (canoe single)	0-0-1	0-0-0	0	0-1-0	2-0-1	5-2-0
Alexander Slafkovský	C-1 (canoe single)	0-0-0	0-2-0	3	3-3-2	10-0-0	8-3-1
Jana Dukátová	K-1/C-1 (kayak single/canoe single)	0-0-0	2-3-0	4	1-2-1	1-1-1	3-3-4

=== Biathlon ===
Anastasiya Kuzmina has enjoyed success in biathlon. At the 2010 Winter Olympics she won a gold in the sprint and a silver in the pursuit. She successfully defended her sprint title at the 2014 Winter Olympics, and took a third gold in the 2018 Games in the mass start, along with two silvers in the pursuit and the individual. In season 2017/2018 she also took her first discipline World Cup titles, winning the Crystal Globes for the sprint and pursuit disciplines. In season 2018/2019 she again won the Crystal Globes for the sprint. She also won a gold medal in the sprint at the 2019 World Championships, a silver medal in the mass start race at the 2009 World Championships and a bronze in the sprint at the 2011 Worlds. Martina Halinárová won a silver medal in the pursuit at the 1999 World Championships. Pavol Hurajt took a bronze medal at the 2010 Winter Olympics in the mass start.

=== Athletics ===
Matej Tóth is olympic champion in 50 km walk at 2016. He also won a gold medal at the 2015 World Championship and two silver medals at the 2014 European Championships and 2018 European Championships. Libor Charfreitag is European champion in a hammer throw at the 2010. He also won a bronze medal at the 2007 World Championships. Annual marathons take place in Slovakia in places including Košice, Rajec and Bratislava.

=== Canoe Sprint ===
Slovakia has 3 silver and 1 bronze medals from Olympic Games. Slavomír Kňazovický won a silver medal in the C-1 500 m at the Atlanta 1996. Men's K-4 1000 m won two silver and one bronze medals at the Summer Olympic Games. Slovakia has won 36 medals (16—9—11) at World Championships and 45 medals (17—16—12) at European championships.

=== Shooting ===
Slovakia has 2 silver and 3 bronze medals from Olympic Games. Zuzana Rehák-Štefečeková won two silver medals at the 2008 Summer Olympics and 2012 Summer Olympics. She also won two gold medals at the World Championship in 2010 and 2018 and two gold medals at the European Championships in 2015 and 2016. Jozef Gönci won two bronze olympic medals in Men's 50 m rifle prone at 1996 and in Men's 10 m air rifle at 2004. Bronze medal has too Danka Barteková from London 2012 in Women's skeet.

=== Tennis ===
Slovakia Fed Cup team won the Cup in 2002 and Slovakia Davis Cup team runner-up in 2005 Davis Cup. Also Slovakia won Hopman Cup three times. 2016 WTA Finals Champion and 2014 Australian Open runner-up Dominika Cibulková and 2008 Australian Open semi-finalist Daniela Hantuchová are the most well known Slovak women's professional tennis players. Martin Kližan who achieved a career high ATP ranking of 24 in April 2015 is the highest ranked Slovak men's professional player.

=== Cycling ===
The best known Slovak cyclists currently competing are Peter Sagan and brothers Martin and Peter Velits. Sagan won three stages of the 2011 Vuelta a España, and at the 2012 Tour de France he won three more stages and the points classification. He repeated his victory in the points classification in the 2013 Tour and won another stage, and subsequently retained his points jersey in 2014, 2015, 2016, 2018 and 2019. He won the Road Race World Championship in 2015, 2016 and 2017. Sagan also won two Cycling monument on Tour of Flanders and Paris–Roubaix. He won on 2016 European Road Championships too. Peter Velits was classified second at the 2010 Vuelta a España after initial runner-up Ezequiel Mosquera was disqualified for a positive test for Hydroxyethyl starch. He and his HTC Columbia team also won the race's initial team time trial stage, and he won the race's individual time trial on stage 17.

=== Skiing ===
Veronika Velez-Zuzulová was a top-ranked slalom skier from her emergence in the mid-2000s until her retirement in 2018. Her best results in the World Cup season standings came in the 2016 and 2017 seasons, when she finished second in the slalom discipline. She also twice finished third in the Alpine Skiing World Cup slalom standings: in 2008 and in 2013, a season in which she also scored two World Cup wins. She has since been followed by Petra Vlhová, who won the slalom at the 2014 World Junior Championships before taking her first World Cup race win in December 2015 in a slalom in Åre. Both were part of the Slovak team which took a surprise silver in the team event at the 2017 World Championships in St. Moritz. Petra Vlhová won a gold medal in the giant slalom, a silver medal in the combined and a bronze medal in the slalom at the 2019 World Championships. She finished second in the Alpine Skiing World Cup 2019 and also was second in the giant slalom and slalom.

== Largest football stadiums ==
Bratislava		Trnava	Dunajská Streda
Tehelné pole	Štadión Pasienky	Anton Malatinský Stadium	MOL Aréna
Capacity: 22,500	Capacity: 11,591	Capacity: 18,200	Capacity: 12,700
Košice	Sport in Slovakia is located in Slovakia		Žilina
Košická futbalová aréna	Sport in Slovakia is located in Slovakia		Štadión pod Dubňom
Capacity: 12,555	Sport in Slovakia is located in Slovakia		Capacity: 10,897

== Slovak sports in world rankings ==
The table shows the most recent rankings of Slovak national teams in the most popular sports.

Sport	Ranking	Rank		Nr. of countries		Updated	Link
Sport	Ranking	Men	Women	Men	Women	Updated	Link
Football	FIFA World Rankings	31 ▼2	48 ▼1	209	177	24 Oct 2019	
Ice hockey	IIHF World Ranking	9 ▲1	15	50	38	May 2019	
Tennis	Davis Cup/Fed Cup Ranking	29	15 ▲1	132	102	22 Apr 2019	
Handball	IHF Ranking	22	17	46	45	2019	
Basketball	FIBA World Rankings	68 ▲7	28 ▼1	81^{a}	73^{a}	Sep 2019	
Volleyball	FIVB World Rankings	27	52	122	112	29 Sep 2019	
Road cycling	UCI World Tour Ranking	24	54 ▼1	20^{a}	66	29 Sep 2019	
Biathlon	IBU Nation Cup Scores	12 ▲3	10 ▼1	40	40	2013	

=== Notes ===
- ^{a} The countries have not scored any points are not on the list

== See also ==
- Slovakia at the Olympics
- National sports teams of Slovakia
- History of Slovakia
- Economy of Slovakia
