= Sammarinese Rugby Federation =

Federazione Sammarinese Rugby
- Sport: Rugby union
- Founded: 2005
- Rugby Europe affiliation: 2007
- President: Marc Lazzari

The Sammarinese Rugby Federation (Italian: Federazione Sammarinese Rugby) is the governing body for rugby in San Marino. It oversees the development of the sport in the country.

== See also ==
- Rugby union in San Marino
- San Marino national rugby union team
