= Belarusian Rugby Federation =

Sports governing body in Belarus

Беларуская федэрацыя рэгбi
- Sport: Rugby union
- FIRA affiliation: 2013
- President: Aleksandr Danko (also coach)

The Belarusian Rugby Federation (Belarusian: Беларуская федэрацыя рэгбi) is the governing body for rugby in Belarus. It oversees the various national teams and the development of the sport.

The Belarusian Rugby Federation was suspended from World Rugby and Rugby Europe on 28 February 2022 due to the Belarusian government's support for the 2022 Russian invasion of Ukraine.

== Leadership ==
Position	Name
President/Technical Director/Junior Rugby Chair/Commercial Department	Aleksandr Danko
General Secretary	Dimitri Logashin

== See also ==
- Rugby union in Belarus
- Belarus national rugby union team
