= Slovak Rugby Union =

Governing body of rugby in Slovakia

Slovenská rugbyová únia
- Sport: Rugby union
- Founded: 2004
- World Rugby affiliation: 2016 (Associate Member)
- FIRA-AER affiliation: 2004
- President: Eduard Krützner, Jr. (2009-to present)
- Men's coach: Pavel Lištván
- Women's coach: Martin Šlosárek
- Website: www.rugbyunion.sk

The Slovak Rugby Union (Slovak: Slovenská rugbyová únia) is the governing body for rugby in Slovakia. The SRU is headed by the President Eduard Krützner with Michal Mihálik acting as the Chief Executive Officer.

== History ==
In September 2015, SRU join the project of the World Rugby "Get into rugby", prior to becoming an associate member of World Rugby in May 2016.^{a}

== Domestic rugby ==
The SRU oversees the national league system, known as the Slovak Rugby League Championship, and consisting of:

- Rugby 7s league
- Rugby XV league

It also oversees the test match outside of Slovakia, as in Austria, Hungary, and Czech Republic.

== Players ==
- Matthew Cingel
- Léon De Borggraef

== Links ==
- Slovakia national rugby union team
- FIRA-AER
- Rugby Klub Bratislava
- Rugby Union Club Piešťany

== Notes ==
^a The World Rugby Handbook lists Slovenská Rugbyová Únia as having gained associate member status in May 2016 although, as at January 2017, incorrectly records the country name as Slovenia instead of Slovakia. Slovenia's Rugby Zveza Slovenie is listed as being a World Rugby member since October 1996.

== Sources ==
- "Handbook" (PDF). World Rugby. 3 January 2017. Archived from the original (PDF 6.0 MB) on 17 April 2017.
