= Rugby union in Iceland =

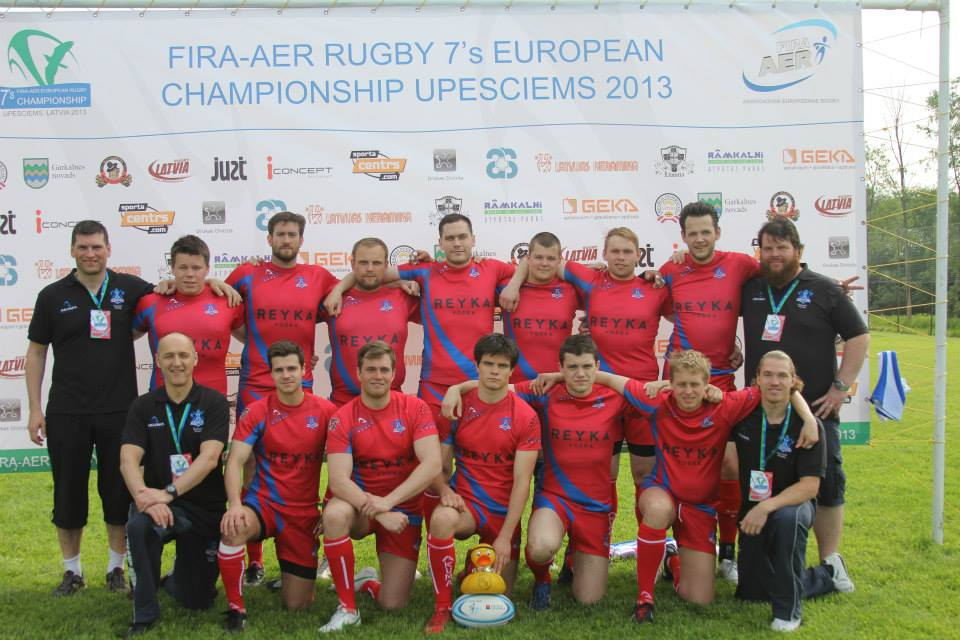
Icelandic rugby team at the sevens tournament in Riga in June 2013

Rugby union is a minor sport in Iceland with a discontinuous history.

== History ==
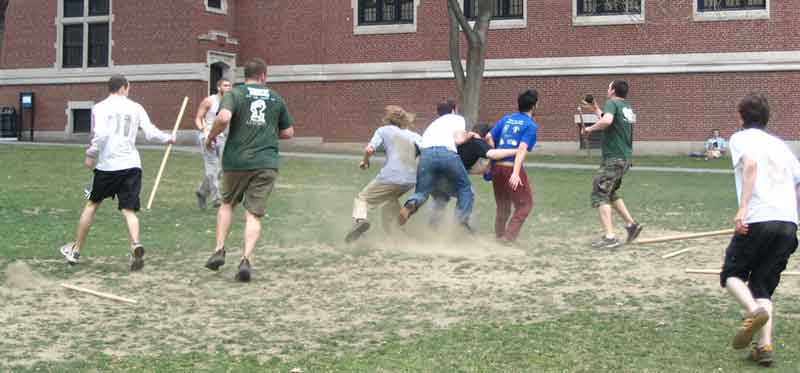
A revived form of knattleikr

The ancient Norse had a sport called knattleikr; while this differed substantially from rugby in that it used sticks, it also had a couple of similarities to it in tackling methods and that the ball could be carried.

As a purist language, which has almost no modern foreign loanwords, Icelandic has a unique name for rugby, Ruðningur. It is perhaps the only language to use its own name for the sport which is not cognate with "rugby".

Iceland was formerly a colony of Denmark, and when Denmark was occupied by Germany during World War II, British forces occupied Iceland itself. However, it is not recorded whether they played in Iceland while stationed there. Rugby itself was first played in Denmark in 1931, and did not reach Iceland – likewise, the Danish Rugby Union was founded after Icelandic independence in 1950.

Iceland became independent in 1944, and the British turned their base over to the USA which took responsibility for the defence of the island during the Cold War. What little rugby appears to have been played in Iceland seems to have been at the American base at Keflavik, by Americans, with little or no local involvement. However, while there is a large American player base, mainly by dint of a large population, rugby is a minor sport in the USA.

== Recent history ==
In 2009, a group of expats and locals started the project to create the first rugby team in Iceland. They can be found on Facebook at the Rugby félag Íslands (Icelandic Rugby Team) group.

In 2010, The Reykjavik Raiders Rugby Club was founded. The team competed in The Copenhagen Sevens in August of this year. This was the first time an Icelandic rugby team had played anywhere. They continue to train and grow and are working hard to eventually establish and develop the game in Iceland with a view to grow the sport domestically and competing internationally.

Sunday 3 July 2011, is a historic event for the development of rugby union in Iceland and a major milestone for the Reykjavík Raiders Rugby Football Club. For both the Raiders, and Iceland this date marks the first 15's game played by the club and the first ever played on Icelandic soil. The game against the Thunderbird Old Boys from Glendale, Arizona at the Valur sports complex in Reykjavík was a great learning step for the Icelandic team that ended with an Icelandic win.

Starting in January 2012 RKK or the Rugby Club of Kópavogur has been added to the portfolio of clubs operating in Iceland. The first game scheduled between the two Icelandic teams is scheduled to take place in April.

In February 2013 the Icelandic Exiles rugby team plays six XV games and participated in the Vegas HSBC Invitational Rugby Tournament.

The Icelandic Rugby Team plays its first official rugby 7s tournament Saturday 1 Juni 2013 in Riga at the FIRA-AER Rugby 7s. It has participated in the FIRA-AER Rugby 7s at Ricani near Pragues on Saturday 28 juni 2014.

There is no sport union in Iceland for rugby. There needs to be established a minimum of 5 rugby clubs before a union can be formed. Rugby Iceland is the representing body for the sport in the country - They are currently affiliated to FIRA-AER, but not yet to the IRB.
