= 2017 Rugby Europe Women's Sevens Conference =

- Host nation: Slovakia
- Date: 24–25 June 2017

Cup
- Champion: Norway
- Runner-up: Austria
- Third: Georgia

5th Place
- Winner: Croatia
- Runner-up: Bulgaria

Challenge
- Winner: Luxembourg
- Runner-up: Slovenia

The 2017 Rugby Europe Women's Sevens Conference was the third level of international women's rugby sevens competitions organised by Rugby Europe during 2017. It featured one tournament hosted in Košice, Slovakia. The winners and runners up, Norway and Austria respectively, were promoted to the 2018 Trophy series.

== Pool stages ==
=== Pool A ===
Teams	Pld	W	D	L	PF	PA	+/−	Pts
Croatia	3	2	1	0	36	24	+12	8
Norway	3	2	0	1	67	12	+55	7
Bulgaria	3	1	1	1	36	46	-10	6
Lithuania	3	0	0	3	26	83	-57	3

Matches

24 June 2017
10:00

Norway	33–0	Lithuania

24 June 2017
10:22

Croatia	5–5	Bulgaria

24 June 2017
12:45

Norway	29–0	Bulgaria

24 June 2017
13:07

Croatia	19–14	Lithuania

24 June 2017
15:30

Norway	5–12	Croatia

24 June 2017
15:52

Bulgaria	31–12	Lithuania

=== Pool B ===
Teams	Pld	W	D	L	PF	PA	+/−	Pts
Denmark	3	3	0	0	92	10	+82	9
Georgia	3	2	0	1	48	31	+17	7
Austria	3	1	0	2	68	43	+25	5
Bosnia and Herzegovina	3	0	0	3	0	124	-124	3

Matches

24 June 2017
10:44

Denmark	51–0	Bosnia and Herzegovina

24 June 2017
11:06

Georgia	19–14	Austria

24 June 2017
13:29

Denmark	24–5	Austria

24 June 2017
13:51

Georgia	24–0	Bosnia and Herzegovina

24 June 2017
15:52

Austria	49–0	Bosnia and Herzegovina

24 June 2017
16:14

Denmark	17–5	Georgia

=== Pool C ===
Teams	Pld	W	D	L	PF	PA	+/−	Pts
Slovakia	3	2	1	0	47	12	+35	8
Andorra	3	2	1	0	52	24	+28	8
Slovenia	3	1	0	2	41	55	-14	5
Luxembourg	3	0	0	3	22	71	-49	3

Matches

24 June 2017
11:28

Slovakia	21–5	Slovenia

24 June 2017
11:50

Luxembourg	5–28	Andorra

24 June 2017
14:13

Slovakia	7–7	Andorra

24 June 2017
14:35

Luxembourg	17–24	Slovenia

24 June 2017
16:58

Slovakia	19–0	Luxembourg

24 June 2017
17:20

Andorra	17–12	Slovenia

== Knockout stage ==
=== Challenge Trophy ===
Semi-finals
25 June 2017 – 11:28
Slovenia	22
Bosnia and Herzegovina	0
25 June 2017 – 11:50
Luxembourg	19
Lithuania	0

Final
25 June 2017 – 15:05
Slovenia	12
Luxembourg	35
Third place
25 June 2017 – 14:43
Bosnia and Herzegovina	0
Lithuania	12

=== 5th Place ===
Quarter-finals
25 June 2017 – 10:00
Croatia	0
Austria	22
25 June 2017 – 11:06
Georgia	17
Andorra	0
25 June 2017 – 10:22
Denmark	22
Bulgaria	7
25 June 2017 – 10:44
Slovakia	0
Norway	24

Semi-finals
25 June 2017 – 13:15
Croatia	22
Andorra	7
25 June 2017 – 13:37
Bulgaria	15
Slovakia	5

Final
25 June 2017 – 16:24
Croatia	15
Bulgaria	0
Third place
25 June 2017 – 16:02
Andorra	10
Slovakia	5

=== Cup ===
Quarter-finals
25 June 2017 – 10:00
Croatia	0
Austria	22
25 June 2017 – 11:06
Georgia	17
Andorra	0
25 June 2017 – 10:22
Denmark	22
Bulgaria	7
25 June 2017 – 10:44
Slovakia	0
Norway	24

Semi-finals
25 June 2017 – 13:59
Austria	10
Georgia	7
25 June 2017 – 14:21
Denmark	0
Norway	33

Final
25 June 2017 – 17:14
Austria	5
Norway	21
Third place
25 June 2017 – 16:52
Georgia	7
Denmark	5

== Final standings ==
Legend
Promoted to 2018 Trophy series

Rank	Team
1st place, gold medalist(s)	Norway
2nd place, silver medalist(s)	Austria
3rd place, bronze medalist(s)	Georgia
4	Denmark
5	Croatia
6	Bulgaria
7	Andorra
8	Slovakia
9	Luxembourg
10	Slovenia
11	Lithuania
12	Bosnia and Herzegovina
