= Azerbaijan Rugby Federation =

Sports governing body in Azerbaijan

Azərbaycan Reqbi Federasiyası
- Sport: Rugby union
- President: Eldegiz Rafibeyli
- Men's coach: Vaqif Sadatxan

The Azerbaijan Rugby Federation (Azerbaijani: Azərbaycan Reqbi Federasiyası) is the governing body for Rugby union in Azerbaijan. It oversees the various national teams as well as development of rugby within the country.

== History ==
Historically, rugby union in Azerbaijan had been governed by the Rugby Federation of the Soviet Union, which the Azerbaijan Soviet Socialist Republic was a part of. During this time, no Azerbaijani club won any Soviet competition. Following the dissolution of the Soviet Union, expatriates started working in the new independent nation. In the mid-1990s, a number of British expatriate workers came together and founded Baku Rugby Club. The club subsequently gained sponsorship and attention for Azerbaijan rugby by entering the Dubai Sevens in consecutive years. The club then formed the core for the creation of the Azerbaijan Rugby Federation as an independent governing body for rugby union in Azerbaijan. In April 2004, they became an associate member of the Fédération Internationale de Rugby Amateur, the governing body of European rugby union. They govern the Azerbaijan national rugby union team that played its first official international match in 2005. In 2012, the team briefly went on hiatus due to a lack of suitably qualified players being available to the Azerbaijan Rugby Federation to select.

By the 2010s, the Azerbaijan Rugby Federation had started hosting small rugby tournaments for international teams. In the 2020s, the Federation did consider switching continental associations to affiliate with Asia Rugby on geographical considerations, but instead opted to remain an associate member of Rugby Europe.

== See also ==
- Rugby union in Azerbaijan
- Azerbaijan national rugby union team
