= Rugby union in San Marino =

- Country: San Marino
- Governing body: Federazione Sammarinese Rugby
- National team: San Marino

National competitions
- Rugby World Cup; Rugby World Cup Sevens; IRB Sevens World Series; European Nations Cup

Rugby union in San Marino is a minor but growing sport.

== Governing body ==
The governing body is the Federazione Sammarinese Rugby, which was set up in 2004 by the brothers Giacomo and Michele Rossi. It is affiliated to FIRA.

== History ==
Although San Marino is not a major rugby playing nation, it is surrounded by Italy which is one of the countries represented in the Six Nations which is the highest level of competition in Europe.

Aside from the national team, there is one major club, the Rugby Club San Marino. Unlike some microstates which have had to contend with lack of facilities, San Marino's main problem is one of population.

== See also ==
- San Marino national rugby union team
- San Marino Rugby Federation
