= Liechtenstein Rugby Union =

Sport governing body in Liechtenstein

- Sport: Rugby union
- Founded: 2010
- FIRA affiliation: 2011
- President: Oliver Waldherr

The Liechtenstein Rugby Union is the governing body for rugby in Liechtenstein. It oversees the various national teams and the development of the sport.

== See also ==
- Rugby union in Liechtenstein
