= Rugby union in Belarus =

- Country: Belarus
- National team: Belarus

Audience records
- Single match: ? (?). ? vs ? (?, ?)

Rugby union in Belarus is a minor sport. They are currently affiliated to FIRA-AER.

== Governing body ==
The governing body are affiliated to FIRA-AER.

== History ==
=== Soviet Period ===
Rugby union was played in the Russian Empire as early as in 1908. In 1934 the Moscow Championship was started.

In October, 1935, it is recorded that the Russian capital Moscow played the Belarusian capital Minsk, and won 6-0.

The first Soviet Championship took place in 1936, and Minsk team took part in it. There were another in 1938 and 1939, but Belarus teams didn't participate. In 1937, there was an unofficial All-Union competition in which two Moscow based teams played ones from Minsk and Gorky.

In 1949, rugby union was forbidden in the USSR during the "fight against cosmopolitanism". The competitions were resumed in 1957, and the Soviet Championship in 1966. In 1975 the Soviet national team played their first match.

Belarus had its own rugby team in the USSR, but it was not treated as a proper national side.

== Post-independence ==
Since the breakup of the USSR, Belarusian rugby has declined greatly. However, there is at least one club active, RC Vepry Minsk. The national team is seeing a resurgence, and played its first game in recent years on 4 October 2014 against Estonia, which resulted in a 58-12 defeat; a promising result against a well-established team. Leonid Zelenkevich, playing in the second row, brought some much needed experience to the team, having spent the last nine years playing for various clubs in England. It is reported that the national team has some fixtures in 2015, in which they hope to cement their reputation as up-and-coming contenders in the Eastern European circuit.

== See also ==
- Belarus national rugby union team
- Belarus women's national rugby union team
- Belarus national rugby union team (sevens)
- Belarus women's national rugby union team (sevens)
