= Rugby union in Liechtenstein =

- Country: Liechtenstein
- Governing body: Liechtenstein Rugby Union
- National team: Liechtenstein

National competitions
- Rugby World Cup; Rugby World Cup Sevens; IRB Sevens World Series; European Nations Cup

Rugby union in Liechtenstein is a minor but growing sport.

== Governing body ==
The governing body for rugby in Liechtenstein is the Liechtenstein Rugby Union.

== History ==
Liechtenstein was going to take part in one of the early European Club Cup competitions, but this never took off and Liechtenstein had to withdraw for lack of players. In 2013 the team played in the fira sevens gps in Latvia losing to Norway 34-0, Slovakia 26-10 and Estonia 29-15.

There are two clubs, Lynx RC, which is based at Sportpark Eschen-Mauren, in Eschen, they used to play in the Swiss rugby union leagues, and FC Vaduz Red Pride Rugby, based in Liechtenstein's capital, Vaduz.

== See also ==
- Rugby union in Austria
- Rugby union in Switzerland
