= PFK Piešťany stadium =

Slovak football venue

Coordinates: 48°35′46″N 17°50′19″E

- Štadión PFK Piešťany
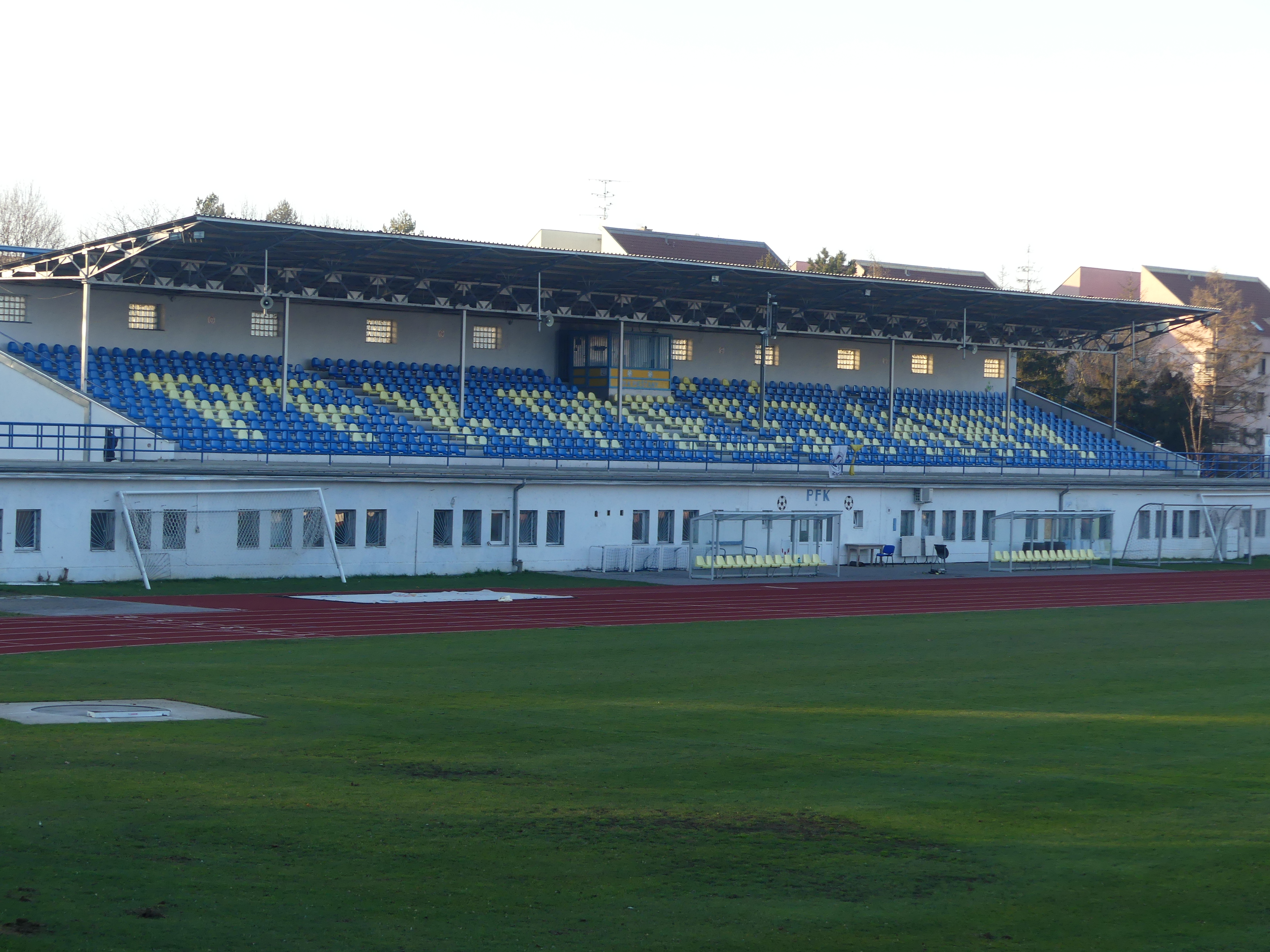
- Main stand in the stadium
- Interactive map of PFK Piešťany stadium
- Address: Piešťany; Slovakia
- Capacity: 8,000 (920 seats)
- Scoreboard: Yes

Tenants
- PFK Piešťany, Rugby Union Club Piešťany

PFK Piešťany stadium (Slovak: Štadión PFK Piešťany) is a football stadium located in Piešťany, Slovakia, which is the home ground of the local football club PFK Piešťany and rugby club Rugby Union Club Piešťany.

The PFK Piešťany stadium has a capacity of 8,000 spectators, of which 920 are seated. Although the grandstand provides seating, the rest of the oval is considered to be in need of reconstruction.

An averages of two to three hundred spectators attend matches in Piešťany.

== History ==
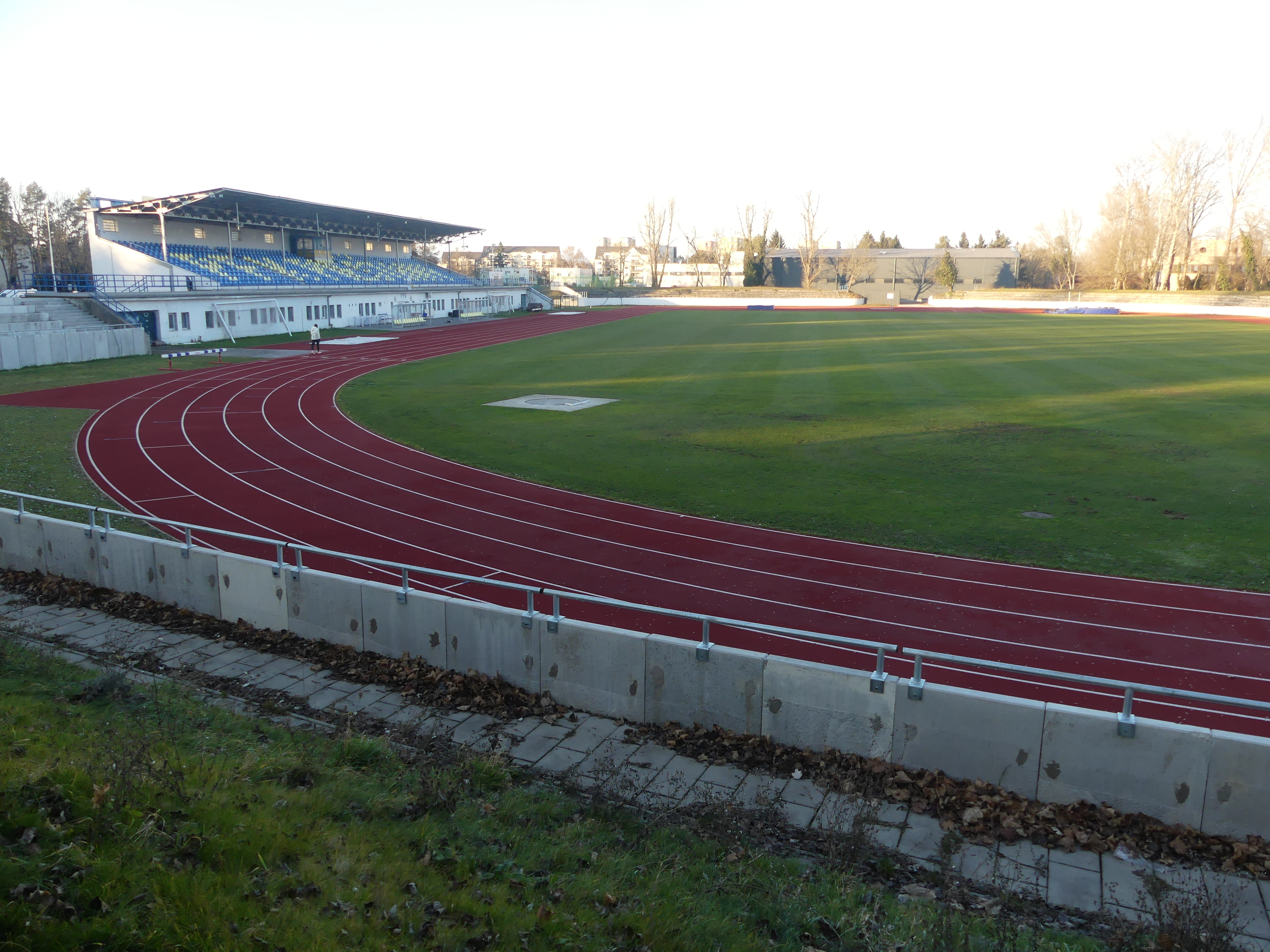
Running track that surrounds the pitch

In 2012, Štadión PFK Piešťany was meant to be used by first league club FC Spartak Trnava for training purposes. However, the club later decided to pursue for a different stadium. In 2012, renovation and construction on the stadium worth 495 thousand euros was meant to take place by the end of 2012, but in the end nothing was invested into the stadium at all. In 2017, there was an attempt robbery at the stadium, with the glass of the stadium being broken. It was reported that the robber fled after noise was made from the destruction. There was over €200 In damages.

On 20 March 2020, PFK Piešťany held a football festival in Piešťany when they welcomed a first division side, FC DAC 1904 Dunajská Streda to their home ground in front of 650 spectators as part of the second round of the Slovak Cup. They lost the game 7–0. In 2021, approximately one million euros was invested in the renovation of the stadium. In 2025, the stadium hosted a game in the third round of the 2025–26 Slovak Cup against reigning champions Slovan Bratislava. With an attendance of 3,589, the game would be won 5–0 by Slovan.

== Other uses ==
The stadium is used for the home games of the Slovak men’s first rugby league club Rugby Union Club Piešťany. It is also used for other rugby games. In 2015, a rugby tournament with teams from Bratislava, Košice, Žilina and Trnava, was held in the stadium. In 2016, first league rugby games were played there.

== See also ==
- List of football stadiums in Slovakia
