= Rugby Union Club Piešťany =

Slovak rugby union club, based in Piešťany

Slovakia
- Union: Slovak Rugby union
- Founded: 2014; 12 years ago
- Location: Piestany, Slovakia
- Ground: football stadium (Capacity: 1,000)
- President: (England) Terry
- Coach: (Europe) Jakub
- Captain(s): (Slovakia) Filip & Adam
Team kit	Change kit

Official website
- rugbyklubbratislava.wordpress.com

Rugby Union Club Piešťany is a Slovak rugby club based in Piešťany, created in 2014. They currently participate in international tournaments, local tournaments and friendly matches with other Slovak teams.

The team plays at the PFK Piešťany stadium, the home stadium of PFK Piešťany, and wears blue, yellow and white.

== History ==
=== Creation ===
The club was established in 2014 by Terry Purton initially involved to develop the sports association. Furthermore, Terry Purton develops the club's training facilities and acquires equipment.

=== Rugby life ===
The club currently provides support to any rugby team who needs additional players for friendly matches and tournaments. The club is expected to establish a full squad shortly to participate in league matches and tournaments independently. The club welcomes and accommodates both native Slovaks and expatriates with a variety of playing experiences. The club emphasises that prior rugby experience is not necessary to join. As Piešťany is Europewide known spa city, it attracts investment from Europe and beyond. This explains the diversity of nationalities representing the club at present.

=== Trainings ===
The club offers weekly training sessions to anyone interested in rugby. Men, women, children, of any age and experience are encouraged to contact the club for further information about joining. Currently, the club holds trainings sessions every Tuesday and Thursday evening and Sunday morning. These training sessions are held primarily in English, although commands are often translated to Slovak. Rugby Union Club Piešťany offers a dynamic mixture of fitness, basic skills, advanced skills and team building. The aim of the training sessions are to ensure that the players are physically, mentally and strategically ready for competitive games, in a diverse and friendly community.

=== Competitions ===
The club plays currently in Slovak league, including Rugby Klub Bratislava, Rugby Club Slovan Bratislava, Trnava Rugby Club, Zilina Rugby Club, and Kosice Rugby Club.
