= Snow golf =

Golf sport played over snow or ice

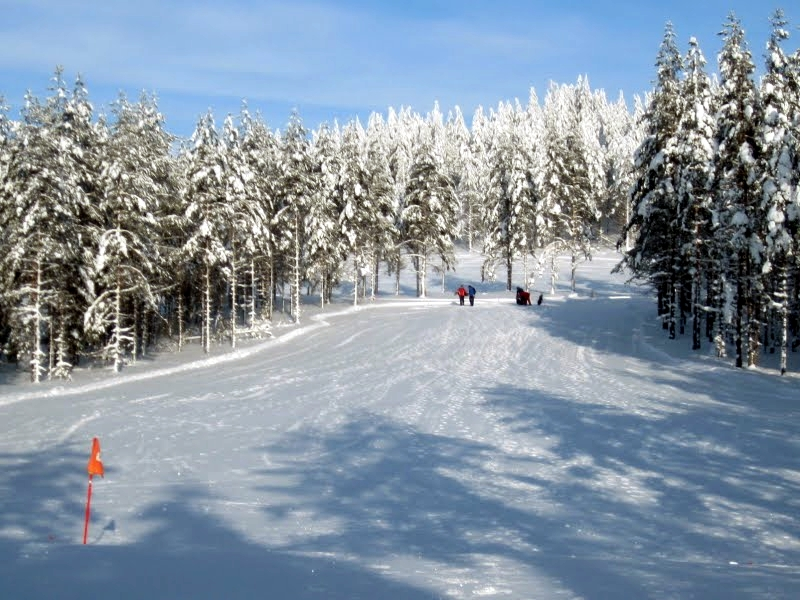
A view on a snow golf course in Jämijärvi, Finland.

Snow golf is a sport based on golf but played over snow (or ice) instead of grass. The "greens" are called "whites" and have a maintained snow or ice surface.

It should not be confused with Crackgar, a form of snow golf belonging to the indigenous tribes living in Kalash Valley in Chitral, Pakistan.

== History ==
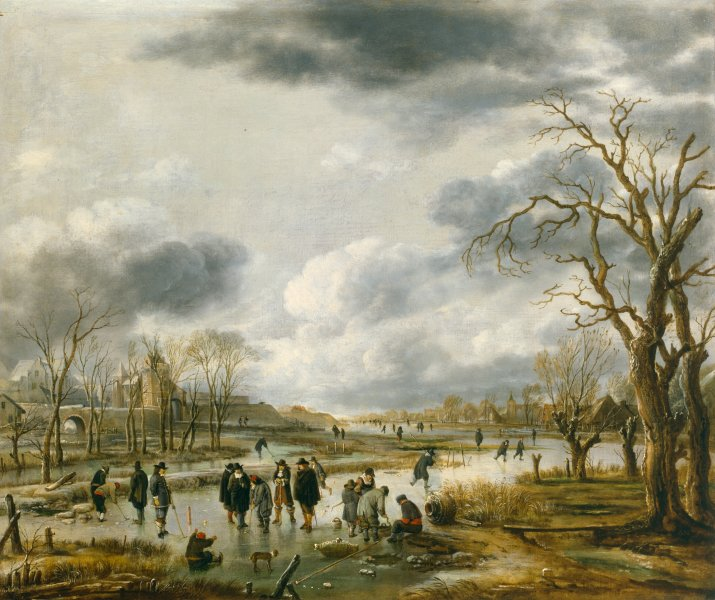
Aert van der Neer, IJsvermaak buiten de stadswal (ca. 1655)

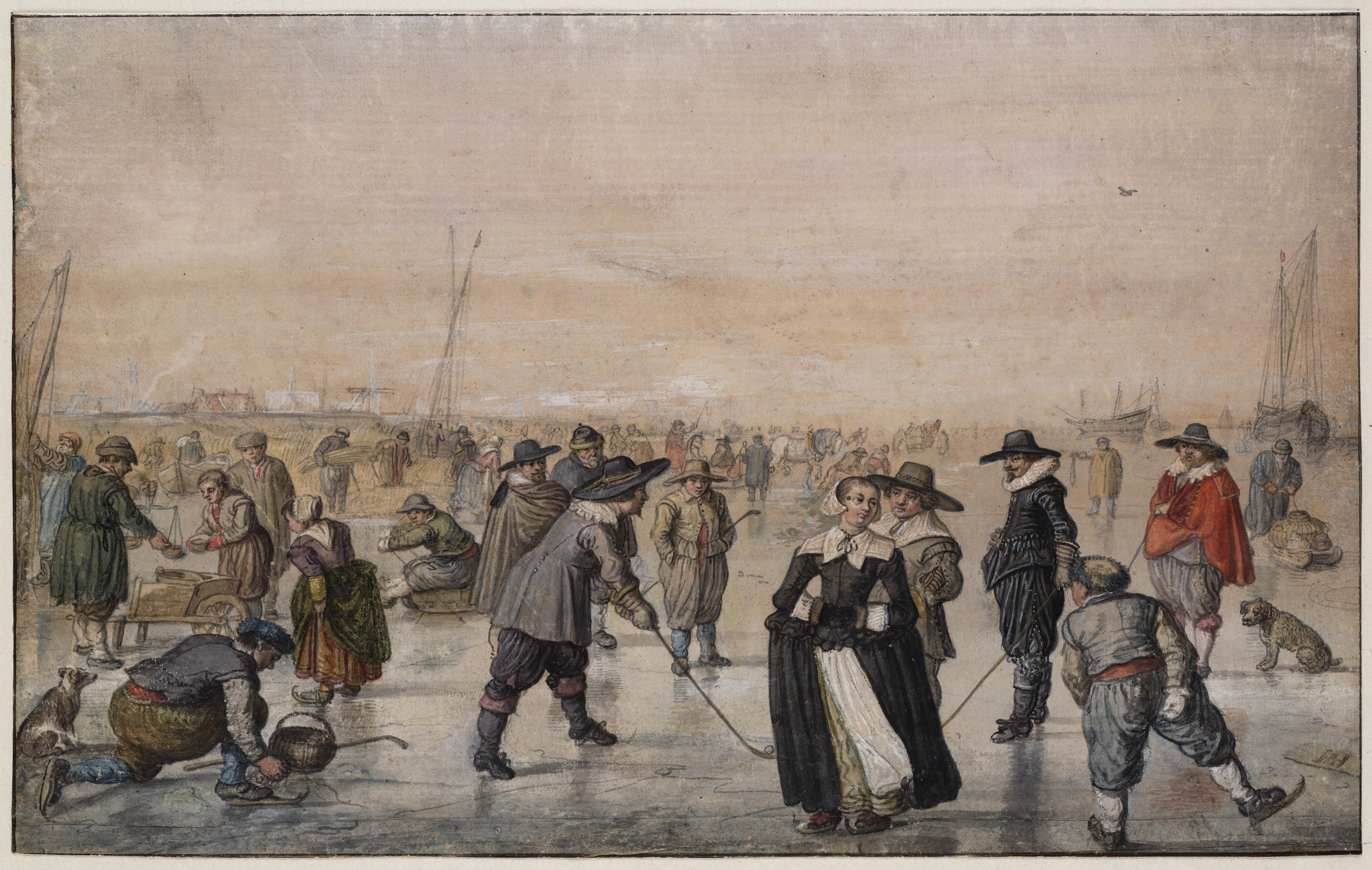
Hendrick Avercamp, A Scene on the Ice (ca. 1615)

Evidence for golf as a popular winter pastime in Holland can be seen in numerous 17th-century paintings by renowned artists Aert van der Neer and Hendrick Avercamp. There is also evidence that golf was practiced on snow and ice in Scotland.

== Snow golf (ice golf) ==
A high quality course is constructed each winter in Jämijärvi. A forested nine-hole course known for its 480 meters par-5 hole, tries to emulate the conditions of the summer game to a high degree. It also caters to events such as the Aalto University competition organized in 2011

== Recurring events ==
The annual World Ice Golf Championship has been held on the world's northernmost golf course on the shelf ice near Uummannaq, Greenland since 1997. The course is reformed by the moving ice every year and play is highly dependent on weather conditions and thus, has been canceled several years running. Competitors are allowed a maximum handicap of 36. Clubs with graphite shafts are not recommended, as they can shatter in the extreme temperatures.

A Snow Golf Championship in Argentina has been held in Cerro Castor, Ushuaia since 2008, by José M. García Daroca.

A Snowgolf World Championship for amateurs was held in January 2007 in Abtenau, Austria. The event is hosted as a major Austrian celebrity event and sponsored by the state of Salzburg as part of the touristic scheme. Another Snowgolf World Championship took place in Obertauern, Austria. The new women's World Champion was Sarah Hölzl (Austria).

Another European championship event in snow golf was held in Switzerland during January 13–16, 2011. Seventy-two qualifiers were entitled to play the two-day tournament.

The Winter Golf Cup is an annual snow golf tour that visits four different ski resorts in the Alps, namely: Courchevel, Megève, and Val-d'Isère in France as well as Crans Montana in Switzerland.

In the United States, The Grimes Hill CC Invitational is an annual tournament held in the state of Vermont which pits golfers against each other in a three-hole playoff to determine the best snow golfer.

== See also ==
- Snow rugby
