= Rugby Iceland =

Sports governing body in Iceland

Rugby Ísland
- Sport: Rugby union
- Founded: 2010
- FIRA affiliation: 2011
- President: Birnir Orri Pétursson

Rugby Iceland (Icelandic: Rugby Ísland) is the governing body for rugby in Iceland. It oversees the various national teams and the development of the sport.

== See also ==
- Rugby union in Iceland
