= Beach rugby =

Sport

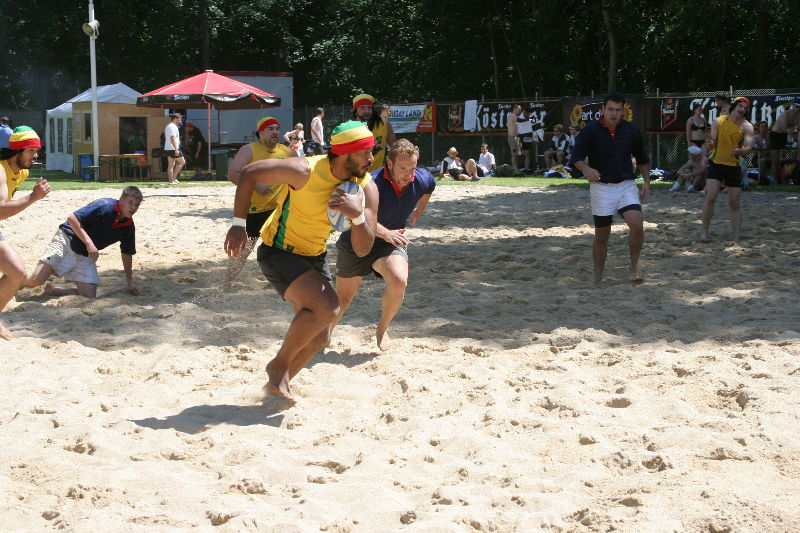
Beach Rugby match

Beach rugby is a sport that is based on rugby union. Currently there is not a centralized regulation of the sport as in beach soccer or beach volleyball, but leagues are common across Europe. The sport is particularly popular in Italy, in the Balkan region and in Eastern Europe. Casual games are played around the world using different sets of rules. However, organized leagues use a field that is only a fraction of the size of a standard rugby field, far fewer players on each team, shorter matches, and a simplified scoring system.

Annual events are held by dedicated organisations in Italy, UK, USA, and Spain.

The inaugural European Beach Five Rugby Championships was held in Moscow in 2017 and is being held there since then.

In Australia in 1937 Sydney rugby union clubs Manly and Parramatta played a 'beach Rugby 7s' game at South Narrabeen Beach in conjunction with a major surf life-saving carnival.

== Rules ==
In Beach rugby, rucks, mauls, scrums, gang tackles, kicks above waist heights, lineouts are outlawed.

=== Field dimensions ===
The size of a beach rugby field depends on the decision of the league. The field is between 30 and 50 metres long and 20–35 metres wide, and the in-goals are 3–7 metres deep. There are no goalposts on the field, and the lines are usually marked with some sort of tape or rope.

=== Number of players ===
Depending on the league and the field size, either 4 or 7 players are allowed on the field for one team at once. Between 3 and 7 reserves are allowed, again, depending on the league. Substitutions are often done "on-the-fly," similar to ice hockey or futsal.

=== The ball ===
A standard rugby ball is used, but many leagues will use a size 4 ball instead of size 5, the size used in all levels of field rugby above youth. A rugby ball is oval-shaped and made of synthetic leather panels that have small dimples to enhance handling.

=== Scoring ===
Most leagues use a "one try, one point" scoring system, since there are no goalposts on the field. Occasionally, a sudden-death extra time period is used to resolve matches drawn at the end of regulation, but not all leagues use this rule.

One Italian league used a system where the in-goals were divided into five equal rectangles. A try scored from the outer rectangles was worth 3 points, from the central rectangle was 5 points, and from either of the two intermediate rectangles was worth 4 points. However, there is no evidence that this league still exists. The Ameland Beach Rugby Festival www.beachrugby.nl(The Netherlands) also uses this system.

=== Timing ===
Leagues use either two 5 or 7 minute halves (with a 1 or 3 minute interval for halftime) as the length of a single match. Extra time may be played if the league in question calls for it.

== European Beach Five Rugby Championships ==
=== Men ===
Year	Host	Final			Semi-finalists		
Year	Host	Winner	Score	Runner-up	Winner	Score	Runner-up
2017	Moscow, Russia	Italy	6–5	Russia	Georgia	8–1	Romania
2018	Moscow, Russia	Russia	4–3	Georgia	Italy	10–3	Latvia
2019	Moscow, Russia	Russia	7–4	Georgia	Italy	13–6	Latvia

=== Women ===
Year	Host	Final			Semi-finalists		
Year	Host	Winner	Score	Runner-up	Winner	Score	Runner-up
2017	Moscow, Russia	Russia	5–0	Georgia	Belarus	5–3	Latvia
2018	Moscow, Russia	Russia	6–3	Italy	Latvia	5–4	Croatia
2019	Moscow, Russia	Russia	2–1	Italy	Spain	6–4	Latvia

== See also ==
- Touch rugby
- Snow rugby
- Rugby union
- Rugby league
- Beach handball
- Beach soccer
- Beach volleyball
