= Rugby union in Azerbaijan =

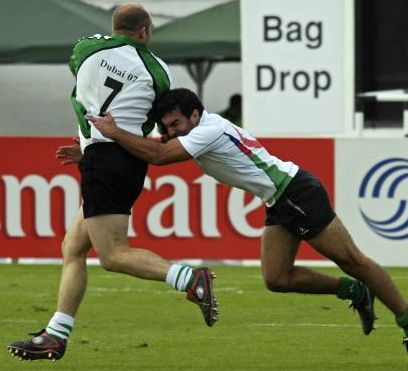
- Azerbaijani rugby player Zahid Sadmaliyev ("Zaza")
- Country: Azerbaijan
- Governing body: Azerbaijan Rugby Federation
- National team: Azerbaijan

National competitions
- Rugby World Cup; European Nations Cup; Rugby World Cup Sevens; IRB Sevens World Series

Audience records
- Single match: ? (?). ? vs ? (?, ?)

Rugby union in Azerbaijan is a growing sport. They are currently unranked in the International Rugby Board's world rankings, which ranks only the top ninety-five countries. The governing body for Azerbaijan is Azerbaycan Reqbi Federasiyasl (Azerbaijan Rugby Federation).

== Governing body ==
The Azerbaijani Rugby Federation founded in 2004 and became affiliated to the International Rugby Board in 2005.

== History ==
=== Soviet period ===
Rugby union was played in the Russian Empire as early as in 1908, and in 1936 the first Soviet Championship took place.

In 1949, rugby union was forbidden in the USSR during the "fight against the cosmopolitanism". The competitions were resumed in 1957, and the Soviet Championship in 1966. In 1975 the Soviet national team played their first match.

Azerbaijan had its own rugby team in the USSR, but it was not treated as a proper national side.

=== Post independence ===
Rugby union in Azerbaijan has begun to grow in recent years, as they competed in the 2006 European Nations Cup. They played two matches; one on 29 April 2006 against Luxembourg at Baku, and one on 14 May 2006 against Bosnia and Herzegovina at Zenica. They lost to Bosnia by a score of 28-7 and also to Luxembourg by a score of 11-3.

Azerbaijan competed in the 2008 ENC Cup.
