= Snow rugby =

Rugby union played in snow

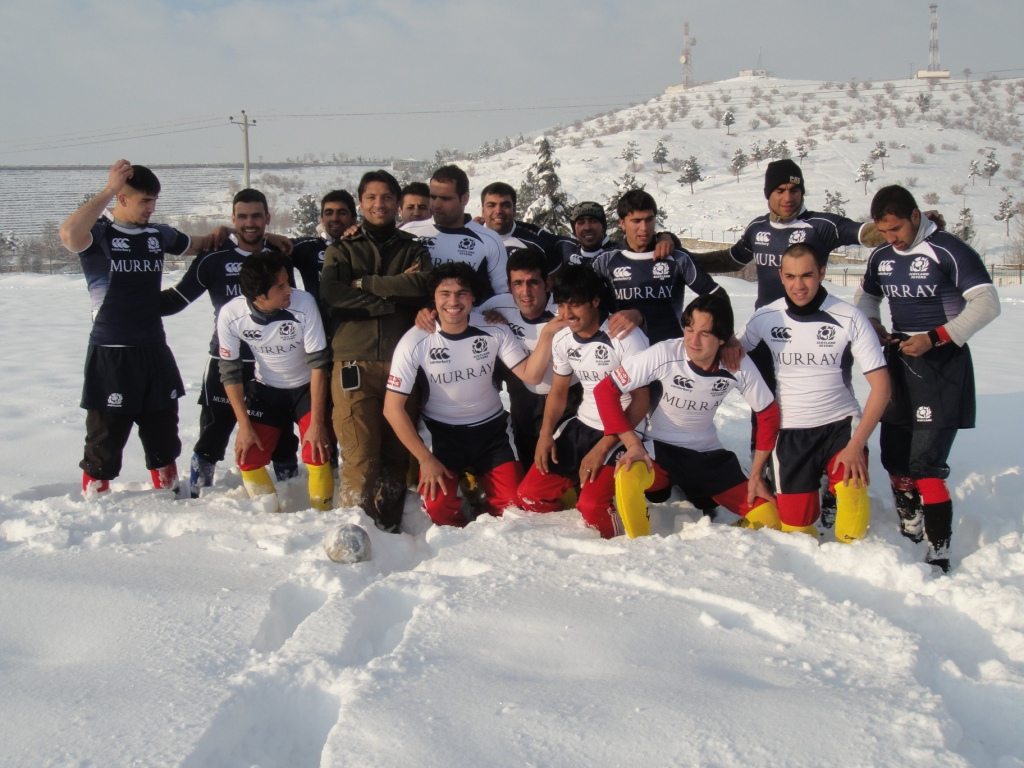
Snow rugby players in Afghanistan

Snow rugby refers to forms of rugby union that are especially adapted to be played in winter conditions, particularly in deep snow. It is played in Canada, the Kashmir region in India, the Baltic states, Russia, the northern United States, and Finland. Specific locations of play include the Argentinian Ski Resort of Las Leñas and the Boitsfort Rugby Club in Brussels.

Because of the cold, and often subzero, temperatures at which snow rugby is played, players must dress warmly.

== History ==
Rugby union is predominantly played during the winter months and it has been played in extremely cold conditions. In 1939 a Ranfurly Shield game in New Zealand was played in the snow and in 1978 a game in Russia was played at −23 °C (−9 °F). More recently games have been organised to be played in the snow. In 2009, Gulmarg hosted India's first ever snow rugby tournament in Kashmir and it was included in the 2008 Indian Winter Games as a demonstrative event. During the 2011 Rugby World Cup Mount Dobson hosted a "20 Below Rugby in the Snow" seven-a-side tournament. Tournaments have also been held in Finland, France, Latvia, and Argentina.

The first European Championships were held in Moscow from 21 to 22 November 2019. Eight teams of each six took part in it.

== Rugby Europe Snow Rugby European Championship ==
=== Men ===
Year	Host	Final			2	Semi-finalists		
Year	Host	Winner	Score	Runner-up	2	Winner	Score	Runner-up
2019	Moscow, Russia	Russia	4–2	Romania	2	Croatia	8–1	Moldova

=== Women ===
Year	Host	Final			Semi-finalists		
Year	Host	Winner	Score	Runner-up	Winner	Score	Runner-up
2019	Moscow, Russia	Russia	8–0	Norway	Romania	5–1	Croatia

== See also ==
- Beach rugby, a form designed to be played on sand.
- Snow golf
