= 2018–19 Biathlon World Cup – Sprint Women =

The 2018–19 Biathlon World Cup – Sprint Women started on 8 December 2018 in Pokljuka and finished on 21 March 2019 in Oslo. It was won by the defending titlist, Anastasiya Kuzmina of Slovakia.

== Competition format ==
The 7.5 kilometres (4.7 mi) sprint race is the third oldest biathlon event; the distance is skied over three laps. The biathlete shoots two times at any shooting lane, first prone, then standing, totalling 10 targets. For each missed target the biathlete has to complete a penalty lap of around 150 metres (490 ft). Competitors' starts are staggered, normally by 30 seconds.

== 2017–18 Top 3 standings ==
Medal	Athlete	Points
Gold:	(Slovakia) Anastasiya Kuzmina	323
Silver:	(Belarus) Darya Domracheva	313
Bronze:	(Finland) Kaisa Mäkäräinen	258

== Medal winners ==
Event	Gold	Time	Silver	Time	Bronze	Time
Pokljuka details	Kaisa Mäkäräinen; Finland	20:08.1 (0+0)	Justine Braisaz; France	20:22.9 (0+0)	Dorothea Wierer; Italy	20:50.2 (0+0)
Hochfilzen details	Dorothea Wierer; Italy	21:04.9 (0+1)	Kaisa Mäkäräinen; Finland	21:05.5 (0+1)	Ekaterina Yurlova-Percht; Russia	21:29.3 (1+0)
Nové Mesto details	Marte Olsbu Røiseland; Norway	19:44.6 (0+0)	Laura Dahlmeier; Germany	19:49.1 (0+0)	Paulína Fialková; Slovakia	19:50.8 (0+0)
Oberhof details	Lisa Vittozzi; Italy	22:34.6 (0+0)	Anaïs Chevalier; France	22:39.9 (0+0)	Hanna Öberg; Sweden	22:49.6 (0+0)
Ruhpolding details	Anastasiya Kuzmina; Slovakia	19:15.1 (0+0)	Lisa Vittozzi; Italy	19:26.6 (0+0)	Hanna Öberg; Sweden	19:44.2 (0+0)
Antholz-Anterselva details	Markéta Davidová; Czech Republic	21:40.7 (0+0)	Kaisa Mäkäräinen; Finland	21:42.4 (0+1)	Marte Olsbu Røiseland; Norway	21:44.2 (1+0)
Canmore details	cancelled due to cold weather					
Salt Lake City details	Marte Olsbu Røiseland; Norway	19:47.6 (0+0)	Kaisa Mäkäräinen; Finland	19:59.1 (0+1)	Franziska Hildebrand; Germany	20:09.0 (0+0)
World Championships details	Anastasiya Kuzmina; Slovakia	22:17.5 (1+0)	Ingrid Landmark Tandrevold; Norway	22:27.2 (0+0)	Laura Dahlmeier; Germany	22:30.1 (0+0)
Oslo details	Anastasiya Kuzmina; Slovakia	19:5.2 (1+0)	Franziska Preuß; Germany	20:17.4 (0+0)	Paulína Fialková; Slovakia	20:21.3 (0+0)

== Standings ==
#	Name	POK	HOC	NOV	OBE	RUH	ANT	SLC	ÖST	OSL	Total
1	Anastasiya Kuzmina (SVK)	23	31	30	36	60	31	40	60	60	371
2	Dorothea Wierer (ITA)	54	60	32	17	38	34	34	31	30	330
3	Marte Olsbu Røiseland (NOR)	18	0	60	43	43	48	60	16	38	326
4	Lisa Vittozzi (ITA)	40	43	23	60	54	40	29	20	0	309
5	Kaisa Mäkäräinen (FIN)	60	54	0	0	20	54	54	29	9	280
6	Monika Hojnisz (POL)	30	40	1	21	30	38	43	7	28	238
7	Paulína Fialková (SVK)	38	36	48	20	27	11	—	0	48	228
8	Hanna Öberg (SWE)	DNS	6	38	48	48	7	—	43	24	214
9	Anaïs Chevalier (FRA)	0	34	43	54	36	22	9	9	—	207
10	Laura Dahlmeier (GER)	—	—	54	—	32	43	—	48	14	191
11	Ingrid Landmark Tandrevold (NOR)	14	21	7	27	15	17	7	54	25	187
12	Franziska Preuß (GER)	32	13	25	0	31	—	0	25	54	180
13	Ekaterina Yurlova-Percht (RUS)	0	48	10	13	17	25	—	34	27	174
14	Clare Egan (USA)	26	0	15	28	6	19	21	30	29	174
15	Denise Herrmann (GER)	0	0	0	5	24	27	36	38	40	170
16	Celia Aymonier (FRA)	1	24	8	32	13	0	30	18	43	169
17	Julia Simon (FRA)	43	18	13	10	26	30	28	0	0	168
18	Iryna Kryuko (BLR)	24	38	21	40	5	24	—	15	0	167
19	Franziska Hildebrand (GER)	3	28	20	1	23	14	48	1	16	154
20	Tiril Eckhoff (NOR)	—	25	18	8	8	26	1	32	36	154
21	Mona Brorsson (SWE)	22	29	5	4	28	20	—	40	0	148
22	Anaïs Bescond (FRA)	11	10	17	34	40	28	2	—	0	142
23	Lisa Theresa Hauser (AUT)	0	19	11	30	19	32	15	0	15	141
24	Markéta Davidová (CZE)	9	0	0	22	0	60	10	36	0	137
25	Irina Starykh (RUS)	29	32	31	12	—	29	—	0	—	133
26	Svetlana Mironova (RUS)	—	—	—	24	29	36	—	10	26	125
27	Justine Braisaz (FRA)	48	0	0	0	36	10	25	0	0	119
28	Anna Frolina (KOR)	25	27	0	23	17	9	—	0	0	101
29	Karolin Horchler (GER)	4	27	14	7	22	5	0	—	21	100
30	Vita Semerenko (UKR)	—	0	36	38	12	0	—	0	13	99
#	Name	POK	HOC	NOV	OBE	RUH	ANT	SLC	ÖST	OSL	Total
31	Elisa Gasparin (SUI)	27	17	0	0	0	0	26	22	4	96
32	Lena Häcki (SUI)	8	8	40	3	0	21	14	0	0	94
33	Linn Persson (SWE)	0	11	4	0	25	13	—	0	34	87
34	Veronika Vítková (CZE)	0	16	22	0	0	0	23	3	18	82
35	Vanessa Hinz (GER)	17	30	19	—	3	3	8	0	0	80
36	Evgeniya Pavlova (RUS)	34	9	DNS	19	0	—	—	17	DNS	79
37	Eva Puskarcíková (CZE)	19	12	0	29	0	0	19	0	0	79
38	Olena Pidhrushna (UKR)	36	14	28	—	0	DNF	—	—	—	78
39	Rosanna Crawford (CAN)	0	0	0	0	14	18	18	23	—	73
40	Susan Dunklee (USA)	0	7	2	31	21	0	0	0	11	72
41	Federica Sanfilippo (ITA)	5	22	9	26	0	0	0	7	0	69
42	Dzinara Alimbekava (BLR)	0	1	0	16	0	0	—	28	22	67
43	Elisabeth Högberg (SWE)	—	—	—	0	—	—	32	—	31	63
44	Baiba Bendika (LAT)	13	0	16	0	1	0	0	24	7	61
45	Nicole Gontier (ITA)	6	0	0	25	0	23	3	0	0	57
46	Emma Lunder (CAN)	—	—	24	0	0	0	0	0	32	56
47	Valj Semerenko (UKR)	16	0	26	0	0	0	—	12	0	54
48	Sari Maeda (JPN)	0	15	0	0	0	0	11	27	0	53
49	Yuliia Dzhima (UKR)	21	—	0	0	0	—	31	0	—	52
50	Anastasiya Merkushyna (UKR)	0	0	27	6	0	6	—	13	0	52
51	Tuuli Tomingas (EST)	0	0	—	0	10	2	27	0	12	51
52	Elena Kruchinkina (BLR)	—	—	—	—	18	4	—	5	23	50
53	Johanna Talihärm (EST)	—	—	0	15	0	0	13	21	0	49
54	Kinga Zbylut (POL)	0	0	34	0	11	0	0	0	0	45
55	Fuyuko Tachizaki (JPN)	0	5	0	0	2	16	20	2	0	45
56	Valeriia Vasnetcova (RUS)	20	23	0	0	—	—	0	—	—	43
57	Joanne Reid (USA)	0	0	0	—	4	12	0	26	0	42
58	Kamila Zuk (POL)	0	0	0	0	0	0	38	0		38
59	Synnøve Solemdal (NOR)	0	—	0	—	0	0	17	0		37
60	Anna Weidel (GER)	31	0	—	0	—	—	—	—	—	31
#	Name	POK	HOC	NOV	OBE	RUH	ANT	SLC	ÖST	OSL	Total
61	Sarah Beaudry (CAN)	—	—	29	0	0	1	0	0	0	30
62	Irina Kruchinkina (BLR)	0	0	0	11	0	0	—	19	0	30
63	Margarita Vasileva (RUS)	28	0	0	0	0	0	DSQ	—	—	28
64	Ivona Fialková (SVK)	0	0	0	18	0	0	—	8	0	26
65	Iana Bondar (UKR)	—	—	—	—	—	—	24	—	0	24
66	Uliana Kaisheva (RUS)	0	0	—	—	—	—	22	—	0	22
67	Tang Jialin (CHN)	0	0	0	14	0	8	—	0	—	22
68	Caroline Colombo (FRA)	—	—	—	0	0	0	12	—	10	22
69	Aita Gasparin (SUI)	0	20	0	0	0	0	0	0	—	20
70	Larisa Kuklina (RUS)	—	—	—	—	0	0	DNS	—	19	19
71	Emma Nilsson (SWE)	15	0	0	—	0	0	—	—	3	18
72	Julia Schwaiger (AUT)	12	0	6	0	0	0	DNF	0	0	18
73	Viktoria Slivko (RUS)	—	—	—	—	—	—	—	—	17	17
74	Thekla Brun-Lie (NOR)	0	DNS	—	0	—	—	16	—	0	16
75	Megan Bankes (CAN)	0	0	—	0	0	15	0	0	0	15
76	Natalija Kocergina (LTU)	0	0	0	0	0	0	0	14	0	14
77	Selina Gasparin (SUI)	—	—	—	—	—	—	—	11	2	13
78	Zhang Yan (CHN)	0	0	0	9	0	0	—	4	—	13
79	Katharina Innerhofer (AUT)	2	3	0	0	0	0	—	0	8	13
80	Lucie Charvátová (CZE)	0	0	12	0	0	0	—	—	0	12
81	Anastasiia Morozova (RUS)	—	—	3	—	9	DNS	—	—	0	12
82	Regina Oja (EST)	0	0	0	—	0	0	5	—	7	12
83	Jessica Jislová (CZE)	10	DNS	—	—	0	0	—	—	0	10
84	Hanna Sola (BLR)	0	0	0	0	7	0	0	—	0	7
85	Emilia Yordanova (BUL)	7	0	0	0	0	0	0	0	0	7
86	Alexia Runggaldier (ITA)	0	0	0	0	0	—	6	—	—	6
87	Desislava Stoyanova (BUL)	0	0	0	0	0	0	0	0	5	5
88	Darya Yurkevich (BLR)	0	0	—	0	—	—	5	—	—	5
89	Emilie Ågheim Kalkenberg (NOR)	0	4	0	0	0	—	0	—	0	4
90	Urska Poje (SLO)	0	3	0	0	0	—	0	—	0	3
#	Name	POK	HOC	NOV	OBE	RUH	ANT	SLC	ÖST	OSL	Total
91	Susanna Meinen (SUI)	0	0	0	2	0	0	0	—	—	2
92	Chloé Chevalier (FRA)	—	—	—	—	—	—	—	—	1	1
