= PFK Piešťany =

Slovak football club

- Full name: PFK Piešťany
- Founded: 1912
- Ground: PFK Piešťany stadium, Piešťany
- Capacity: 8,000 (1,000 seats)
- President: Róbert Studený
- League: 4. Liga - West
- 25/26: 4. liga, 4th
- Website: http://www.pfkpiestany.com/
Home colours	Away colours

PFK Piešťany is a Slovak football club that has been operating in the city of Piešťany since 1912. Since the 2016–17 season, after the arrival of new management, the men's category has been playing in III. West League, but was deregistered from it in 2015. After the "rebirth" in 2016, the club achieved the best 7th place in the 4. West League, but after the reorganization it was relegated back to the 5. League, where it currently operates.

Former logo

== History ==
The Slovak football club was founded in 1912 under the name PAFC Pöstyén (Pöstényi atleticai és futbal club Pöstyén). In 1937, the ice hockey team ŠHK 37 Piešťany split off from it. After 102 years of continuous activity, the men's football team ceased to exist in 2015. The management then decided to continue to operate only the youth teams. Since August 2016, new management has taken over Piešťany football, which decided to restart the men's team by registering in the lowest eighth league.

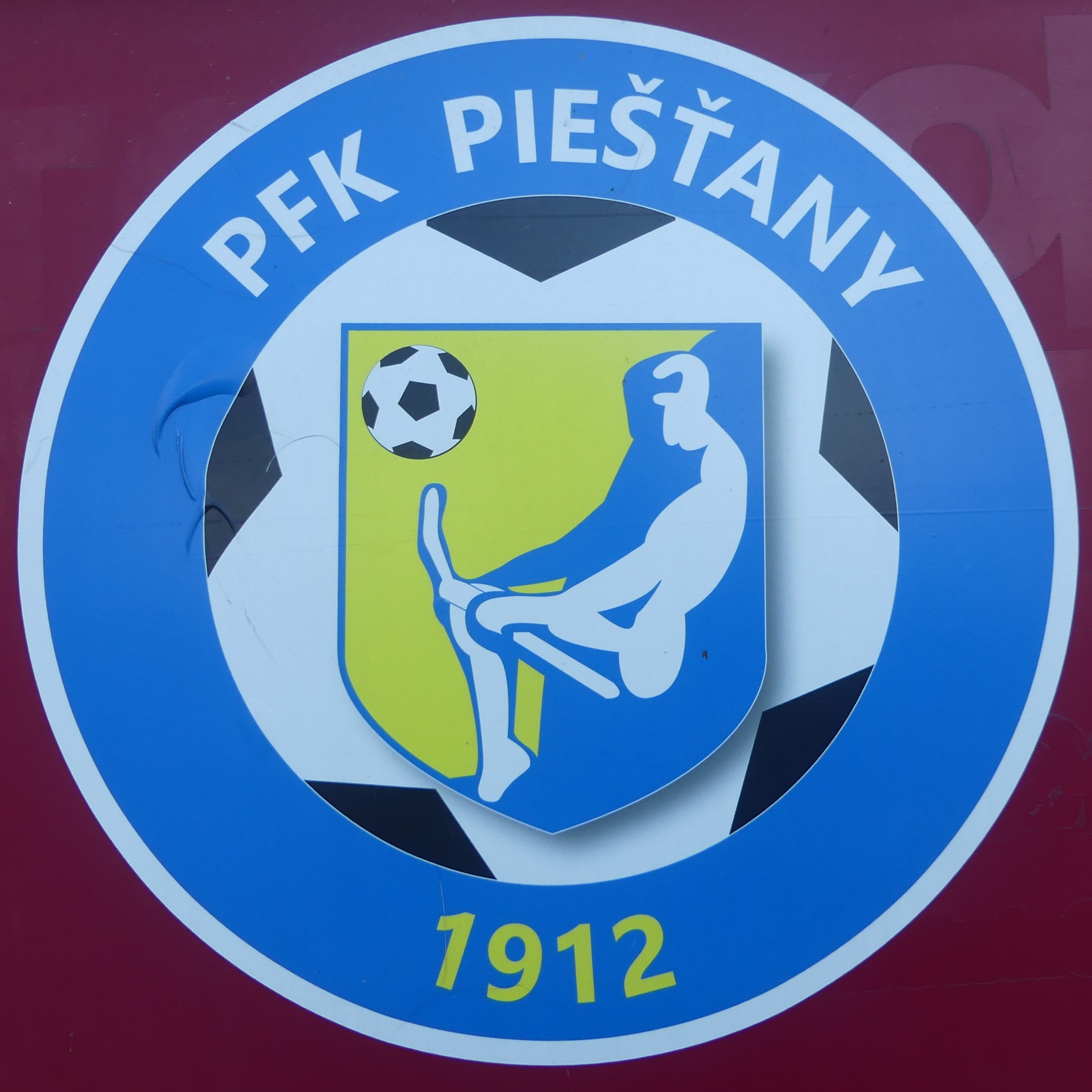

In the 2016-2017 season, the senior team won the eighth league and advanced to the seventh, and in the 2017-2018 season, they also won the seventh league and advanced to the sixth league. In the 2018-2019 season, PFK Piešťany won the sixth league and advanced to the V. league west. In the 2019-2020 season, the team finished in 3rd place in the V. league west.

== Historic names ==
The historic names of PFK Piešťany.

- 1912 - PAFC Pöstyén (Pöstényi atleticai és futbal club Pöstyén)
- 1919 - Piešťanský ŠK (Piešťanský športový klub)
- 1929 - Piešťanský FK (Piešťanský futbalový klub)
- 1948 - TJ Slavoj Piešťany (Telovýchovná jednota Slavoj Piešťany)
- 1988– - PFK Piešťany (Prvý futbalový klub Piešťany)

== Stadium ==
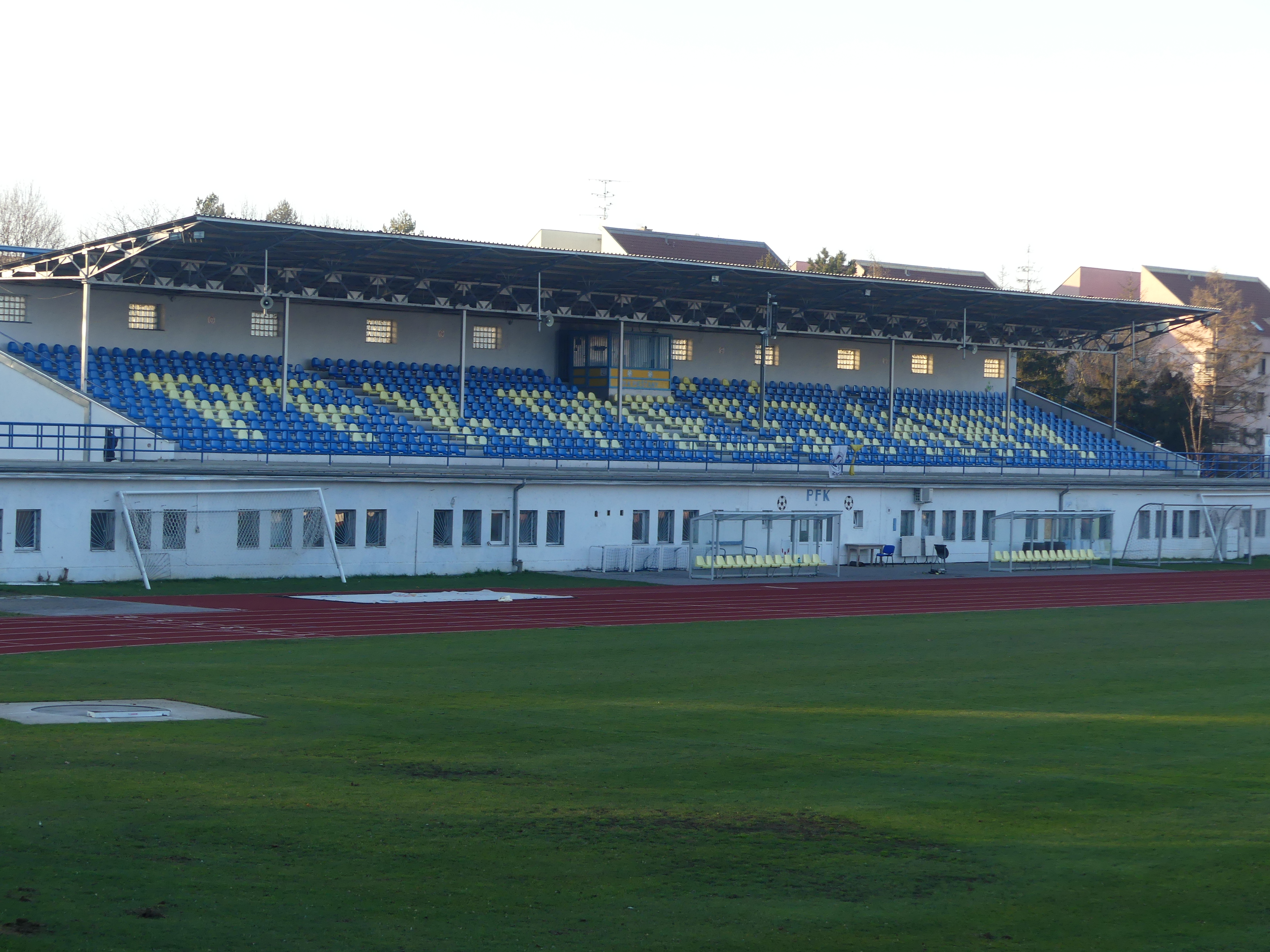
Štadión PFK Piešťany.

The club plays its home matches at the PFK Piešťany stadium, in Piešťany, which has a capacity of 8,000 spectators, of which 920 are seats. Although the grandstand provides comfortable seating, the rest of the oval requires reconstruction.

An averages of two to three hundred spectators attend matches in Piešťany.

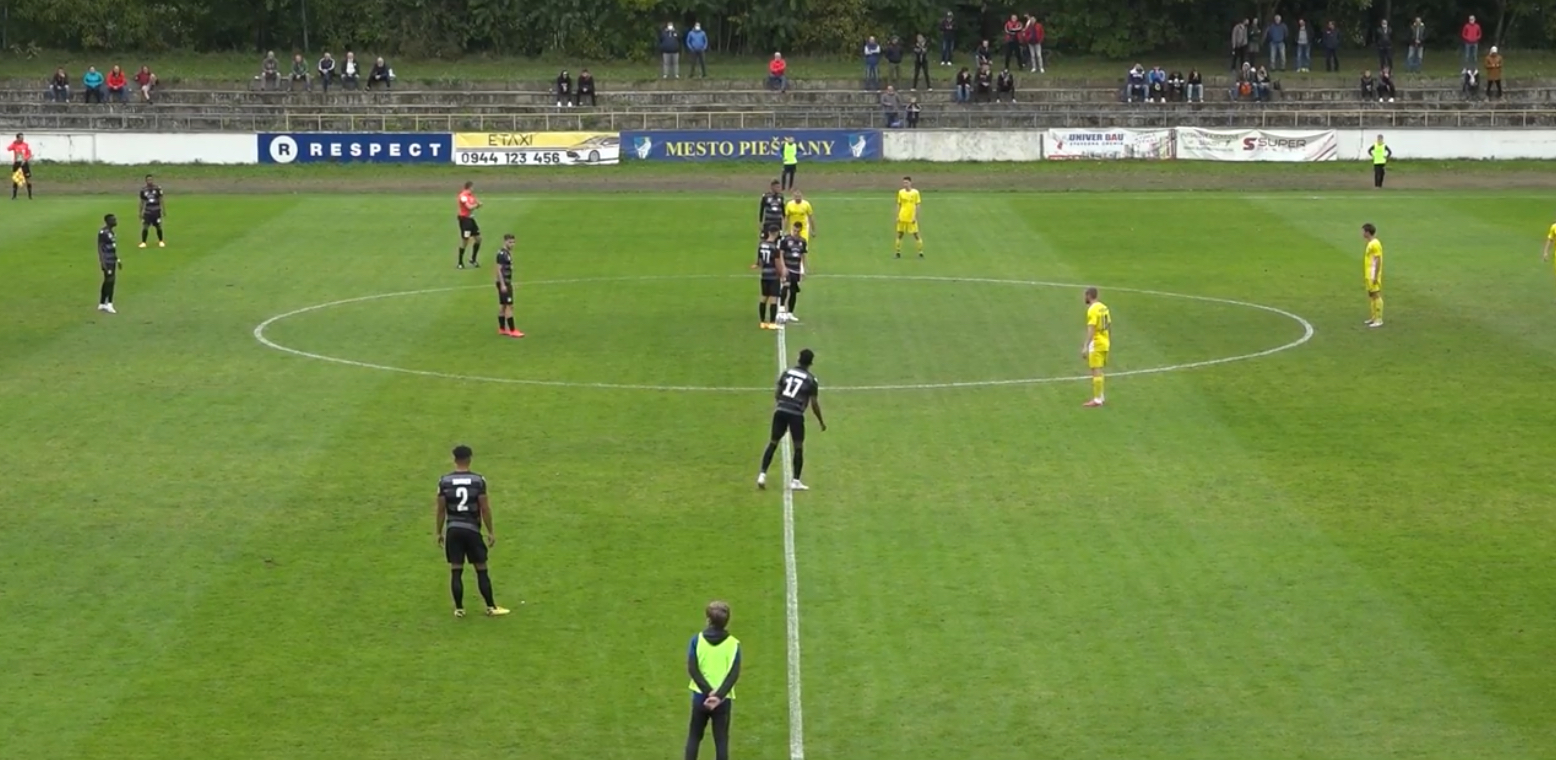
PFK Piestany kicking-off against Dunajská Streda

On 20 March 2020, PFK Piešťany held a football festival in Piešťany when they welcomed a first division side, Dunajská Streda to their home ground in front of 650 spectators as part of the second round of the Slovak Cup. They lost the game 7–0.

== Rivals ==
Piešťany hold a rivalry with neighboring club OFK Trebatice. Matches between the two clubs are called the Piešťansky derby.

== Affiliated clubs ==
The following are the clubs that are affiliated with PFK Piešťany

- FC Spartak Trnava (2020-present)
