= Rugby Klub Bratislava =

Slovak rugby union club, based in Nove Mesto

Slovakia
- Founded: 2015; 11 years ago
- Location: Bratislava, Slovakia
- Ground: Football stadium (Capacity: 1 000)
- President: (France) Charles Cimetiere
- Coach: (New Zealand) Richy
- Captain: (Zimbabwe) Jakov
- League: (Slovakia) Slovak Rugby League
Team kit

Official website
- rkb-rugby.org

Rugby Klub Bratislava is a Slovak rugby club based in Nove Mesto, Bratislava, created in 2015. They are considered one of the most successful rugby teams in the whole of Slovakia.

The club currently plays in Slovak Rugby League, the highest rugby competition in Slovakia. It also participates in friendly Rugby League and Rugby Union matches with Austrian, Czech, and Hungarian teams

== History ==
=== Creation ===
The club was established in 2015 as 'Rugby Skola v Bratislave'. The name changed to 'Rugby Klub Bratislava' a few weeks later, due to legal obligations. The club was founded by Charles Cimetiere and Christopher Bush. A citizens' association 'Olympic RKB' related to Rugby Klub Bratislava was established in 2016. Its aim is to support the club and the club's activities. In 2016, Rugby Klub Bratislava won the Men’s first rugby league.

== Stadium ==
The team trains on the pitch of the University of Economics in Pasienky (Športový areál Ekonomickej univerzity) on Trnavská 37, located next to the Tehelné pole, a stadium used by Slovak First Football League club, ŠK Slovan Bratislava.
