= Rugby Europe =

Administrative body for rugby union in Europe

- Established: 10 June 1935; 91 years ago (as FIRA); 1999 (as FIRA–AER); June 2014
- Type: Sports federation
- Headquarters: Paris, France
- Coordinates: 48°52′46″N 2°19′41″E
- Members: 47 unions
- President: Janhein Pieterse
- Website: Rugbyeurope.eu

Rugby Europe is the administrative body for rugby union in Europe. It was formed in 1999 to promote, develop, organise, and administer the game of rugby in Europe under the authority of World Rugby (the sport's global governing body). However, it is not responsible for the organisation of the Six Nations Championship or the competitions run by European Professional Club Rugby (the European Rugby Champions Cup and Challenge Cup).

The predecessor to Rugby Europe was the Fédération Internationale de Rugby Amateur (FIRA), which was established in 1934 to administer rugby union in Europe outside the authority of the International Rugby Football Board (as World Rugby was then called), and came to spread outside the continent. FIRA agreed to come under the auspices of World Rugby in the 1990s, and appended 'Association Européenne de Rugby' to its name in a return to being a European body. In 2014 the organisation was renamed Rugby Europe as part of a re-branding.

After the 2022 Russian invasion of Ukraine, Rugby Europe suspended Russia from international and European continental rugby union competition. In addition, the Rugby Union of Russia was suspended from Rugby Europe.

== Member unions ==
Rugby Europe has 47 member unions as of December 2021. Not all European member unions are members of World Rugby. Rugby Europe's members are listed below, with the year each union joined World Rugby shown in brackets.

Forty-one (37 Full and 4 Associate) World Rugby members are part of Rugby Europe:

- Andorra (1991)
- Austria (1992)
- Azerbaijan (2004) (Note: World Rugby Associate Member)
- Belgium (1988)
- Bosnia and Herzegovina (1996)
- Bulgaria (1992)
- Croatia (1992)
- Cyprus (2014)
- (Czech Republic) Czech Republic (1988)
- Denmark (1988)
- England (1890)
- Finland (2001)
- France (1978)
- (Georgia (country)) Georgia (1992)
- Germany (1988)
- Hungary (1991)
- Ireland (1886)
- Israel (1988)
- Italy (1987)
- Latvia (1991)
- Lithuania (1992)
- Luxembourg (1991)
- Malta (2000)
- Moldova (1994)
- Monaco (1996)
- Montenegro (2024)
- Netherlands (1988)
- Norway (1993)
- Poland (1988)
- Portugal (1988)
- Romania (1987)
- Scotland (1886)
- Serbia (1988)
- Slovakia (2016)
- Slovenia (1996)
- Spain (1988)
- Sweden (1988)
- Switzerland (1988)
- Turkey (2020)
- Ukraine (1992)
- Wales (1886)

Seven members of Rugby Europe are not affiliated with World Rugby:

- Estonia
- Gibraltar
- Greece
- Iceland
- Kosovo
- Liechtenstein
- San Marino

Six European nations are not currently affiliated with Rugby Europe or World Rugby:

- Albania
- Armenia (Note: Armenia was suspended from Rugby Europe in November 2014 due to inactivity.)
- Belarus (Note: Russia and Belarus were suspended in February 2022 due to the Russian invasion of Ukraine.)
- Faroe Islands
- North Macedonia
- Russia

Additionally, a FIRA founding member was forcibly removed and has recently attempted to regain its international status:

- Catalonia (1934-1940)

== History ==
=== FIRA (1934–1999) ===
In 1931, the French Rugby Federation (FFR) was suspended from playing against the other IRFB nations, because the sport's authorities had suspected for many years that the (FFR) was allowing the abuse of the rules on amateurism. As a result, Fédération Internationale de Rugby Amateur (FIRA) was founded in 1934. It was designed to organise rugby union outside the authority of the International Rugby Football Board (as it was known at the time). The founder members were Italy, France, Spain, Belgium, Portugal, Catalonia, Romania, Holland and Germany. In 1940 the Spanish dictator Francisco Franco forcibly merged Catalonia's team into the Spanish rugby team, thus losing its sporting independence. In the late 2000s the restored Catalan Federation unsuccessfully attempted to recover its international status, citing historical rights as FIRA founder member.

In 1965, FIRA inaugurated the FIRA Nation's Cup, and in 1974 the FIRA Championship, later renamed the European Nations Cup (ENC). The ENC provided international competition for European countries outside the Five Nations. The ENC was played in three divisions, comprising most countries in Continental Europe. The ENC later expanded its horizons, taking in Morocco and Tunisia. The ENC first division competition was won most often by France, but Romania won it five times, and Italy once, in its last edition, in 1995–1997. France and Italy no longer play in the ENC, as both countries now play in the Six Nations Championship.

=== FIRA–AER (1999–2014) ===
In the 1990s, FIRA recognised the IRB as the governing body of rugby union worldwide and after negotiations with the IRB, it agreed to integrate itself within the organisation. In 1999, it changed its name to "FIRA – Association of European Rugby" (FIRA–AER), to promote and rule over rugby union in the European area and to run the junior world championship. FIRA-AER organised both the under-19 and under-21 world championships until IRB folded them into the competitions now known as the World Rugby Under 20 Championship and World Rugby Under 20 Trophy in 2008.

=== Rugby Europe (2014–present) ===
In June 2014, during the annual convention of FIRA-AER in Split, it was decided to rename the organisation to Rugby Europe to provide it with a shorter, more recognisable name.

== Rugby Europe international competitions ==
The highest level of rugby competition played among European countries is the Six Nations Championship, contested every year in February and March by the tier-1 European nations: England, France, Ireland, Italy, Scotland and Wales. The tournament is the oldest international rugby tournament in the world, having begun in 1883, and has been known as the Six Nations Championship since 2000, when Italy joined; it had previously been known as the Home Nations and the Five Nations. There is no promotion or relegation, and since 2000, no country has entered or left the Six Nations. Rugby Europe is not responsible for the organisation of the Six Nations Championship, which is run by the national unions of its participating nations.

The next level of international rugby, played by tier-2 and tier-3 European countries, is the Rugby Europe International Championships. It is made up of five levels or divisions: Championship, Trophy, Conference 1, Conference 2 and Development. Each division consists of five, six, or eight teams, and is played on a round robin format for a one-year cycle, with promotion and relegation between levels and the end of the season. As of 2025, the top division Rugby Europe Championship was contested by eight countries – Belgium, Georgia, Germany, the Netherlands, Portugal, Romania, Spain and Switzerland. Of these countries, four - Georgia, Portugal, Romania and Spain - have played in a Rugby World Cup and are routinely ranked in the Top 30 in the world. Other countries that have participated in past editions include the Czech Republic, Poland, Russia and Ukraine.

=== Other international competitions ===
Senior Men
Men XV

- Rugby Europe International Championships
  - Championship
  - Trophy
  - Conference
- Rugby Europe Super Cup (Club tournament)

Men Sevens

- Rugby Europe Sevens
  - Championship Series
  - Trophy
  - Conference 1
  - Conference 2

Snow rugby

- Rugby Europe Snow Rugby Men's European Championship

Beach rugby

- European Beach Five Men's Rugby Championships

Senior Women
Women XV

- Rugby Europe Women's Championship
  - Championship
  - Trophy

Women Sevens

- Rugby Europe Women's Sevens
  - Championship Series
  - Trophy
  - Conference

Snow rugby

- Rugby Europe Snow Rugby Women's European Championship

Beach rugby

- European Beach Five Women's Rugby Championships

Youth
Men XV

- Rugby Europe Under-20 Championship
- Rugby Europe Under-18 Championship

Men Sevens

- Rugby Europe Under-18 Sevens Championship
  - Championship Series
  - Trophy

Women Sevens

- Rugby Europe Women's Under-18 Sevens Championship
  - Championship Series
  - Trophy

- ^{1} The 2021 Rugby World Cup was postponed by one year in March 2021 to 2022 due to the COVID-19 pandemic.

== Rugby Europe club competitions ==
The highest levels of European club competition played in Europe are the European Rugby Champions Cup and Challenge Cup. These tournaments are contested every year by clubs from the tier-1 European nations: England, France, Ireland, Italy, Scotland and Wales. Rugby Europe is not responsible for the organisation of these competitions, which is run by the European Professional Club Rugby.

Some European clubs from tier-2 and tier-3 European nations participated in the European Shield, which made up the third-tier club competition below the now defunct Heineken Cup and European Challenge Cup. This competition, which was organised solely by European Rugby Cup Ltd, ran from 2002 to 2005 and was primarily made up of tier-1 nations club teams that were knocked out in the first round of the European Challenge Cup, with the addition of one or two teams from tier-2 and tier-3 European nations (Spain, Portugal, and Romania) invited to make up the numbers.

From 2014 to 2019 clubs from tier-2 and tier-3 European countries competed in the European Rugby Continental Shield. This competition was a joint venture between Rugby Europe, European Professional Club Rugby, and the Federazione Italiana Rugby and it provided the winners of this tournament entry into the European Rugby Challenge Cup.

In 2021 Rugby Europe set up the Rugby Europe Super Cup which enabled clubs from tier-2 and tier-3 European countries to participate annually. Teams are divided into two conferences: western and eastern. Each team will play every conference rival home and away. The two best teams from each conference will advance to the semi-finals, where they will compete to play in the final. Currently there are eight clubs involved but this is expected to rise to sixteen by 2025.

== European Rugby Rankings ==
Men's Europe Rugby Rankings (as of 2 January 2023)
Europe*	World Rugby	+/-	National Team	Points
1	1	Steady	Ireland	90.63
2	2	Steady	France	90.01
3	5	Steady	England	83.66
4	7	Steady	Scotland	81.55
5	9	Steady	Wales	78.09
6	12	Steady	Italy	75.95
7	13	Steady	Georgia	75.19
8	16	Steady	Spain	67.17
9	18	Steady	Portugal	65.97
10	20	Steady	Romania	64.79
11	25	Steady	Russia	58.06
12	26	Steady	Belgium	55.97
13	28	Steady	Switzerland	53.8
14	29	Steady	Netherlands	53.12
15	30	Steady	Poland	53.03
16	31	Steady	Germany	52.79
17	35	Steady	Czech Republic	50.26
18	36	Steady	Ukraine	49.61
19	40	Steady	Lithuania	48.09
20	41	Steady	Sweden	48.06
21	45	▲1	Malta	46.75
22	47	▲1	Croatia	46.67
23	57	▼1	Moldova	43.04
24	59	Steady	Bulgaria	42.4
25	61	Steady	Luxembourg	41.08
26	62	Steady	Israel	40.98
27	64	Steady	Latvia	40.73
28	66	Steady	Hungary	39.11
29	75	Steady	Denmark	36.1
30	77	Steady	Slovenia	35.69
31	78	Steady	Finland	35.56
32	80	Steady	Serbia	35.2
33	87	Steady	Austria	33.03
34	88	Steady	Andorra	32.85
35	89	Steady	Bosnia and Herzegovina	31.93
36	100	Steady	Norway	26.52
37	106	Steady	Monaco	17.17
38	107	Steady	Greece	16.55
*Local rankings based on World Rugby ranking points

Women's Europe Rugby Rankings (as of 2 January 2023)
Europe*	World Rugby	+/-	National Team	Points
1	1	Steady	England	94.29
2	3	Steady	France	89.68
3	5	Steady	Italy	78.7
4	8	Steady	Ireland	74.01
5	9	Steady	Wales	72.7
6	10	Steady	Scotland	68.71
7	11	Steady	Spain	68.47
8	14	Steady	Russia	61.1
9	17	Steady	Netherlands	58.27
10	19	Steady	Sweden	57.73
11	21	Steady	Germany	51.72
12	24	Steady	Belgium	45.78
13	30	Steady	Portugal	42
14	31	Steady	Czech Republic	40.86
15	32	Steady	Denmark	40.68
16	40	Steady	Romania	38.95
17	42	Steady	Norway	38.86
18	43	Steady	Finland	38.61
19	44	Steady	Bosnia and Herzegovina	38
20	50	Steady	Switzerland	35.46
21	56	Steady	Luxembourg	32.83
22	58	Steady	Serbia	31.79
*Local rankings based on World Rugby ranking points

== See also ==
- Rugby Europe Women's Sevens
- Rugby Europe Sevens - European Sevens Championship
- Rugby Europe International Championships
- European Nations Cup
- List of women's international rugby union test matches
- Mid-year rugby union internationals
- World Rugby Rankings
