= Rugby union in Mozambique =

Sport in sub-Saharan Africa

Rugby union in Mozambique is a minor but growing sport.

== History ==
As a former Portuguese colony, rugby has been a late arrival to Mozambique. Although rugby has been played in Portugal for decades, it has never become a major sport, and it did not transfer it to its colonies.

Beira used to play a series against Nyasaland sides during the 1930s called the Woury Cup.

Rugby is centred on the national capital and main city, Maputo. Mozambique's poverty and lack of infrastructure make it difficult to maintain a proper national league structure.

However, the country borders South Africa, where rugby is a major sport, and also neighbours Madagascar and Zimbabwe where the game is popular, as well as Malawi, Tanzania, and Zambia, all of which have had a historical rugby presence.

Rugby also has extensive TV coverage on satellite networks in Mozambique.

== See also ==
- Mozambique national rugby union team
- Confederation of African Rugby
- Africa Cup
