= Nyasaland national rugby union team =

The Nyasaland national rugby union team formerly represented Nyasaland, now Malawi, in the sport of rugby union.

Nyasaland played a series of matches in the 1930s against Rhodesia (present day Zimbabwe) starting in 1934. Many of the competitions were against teams from other British colonies in that part of Africa.

The team was composed completely of white Nyasalanders.

The Malawi National Rugby Team now operates under the governing body of MARU.

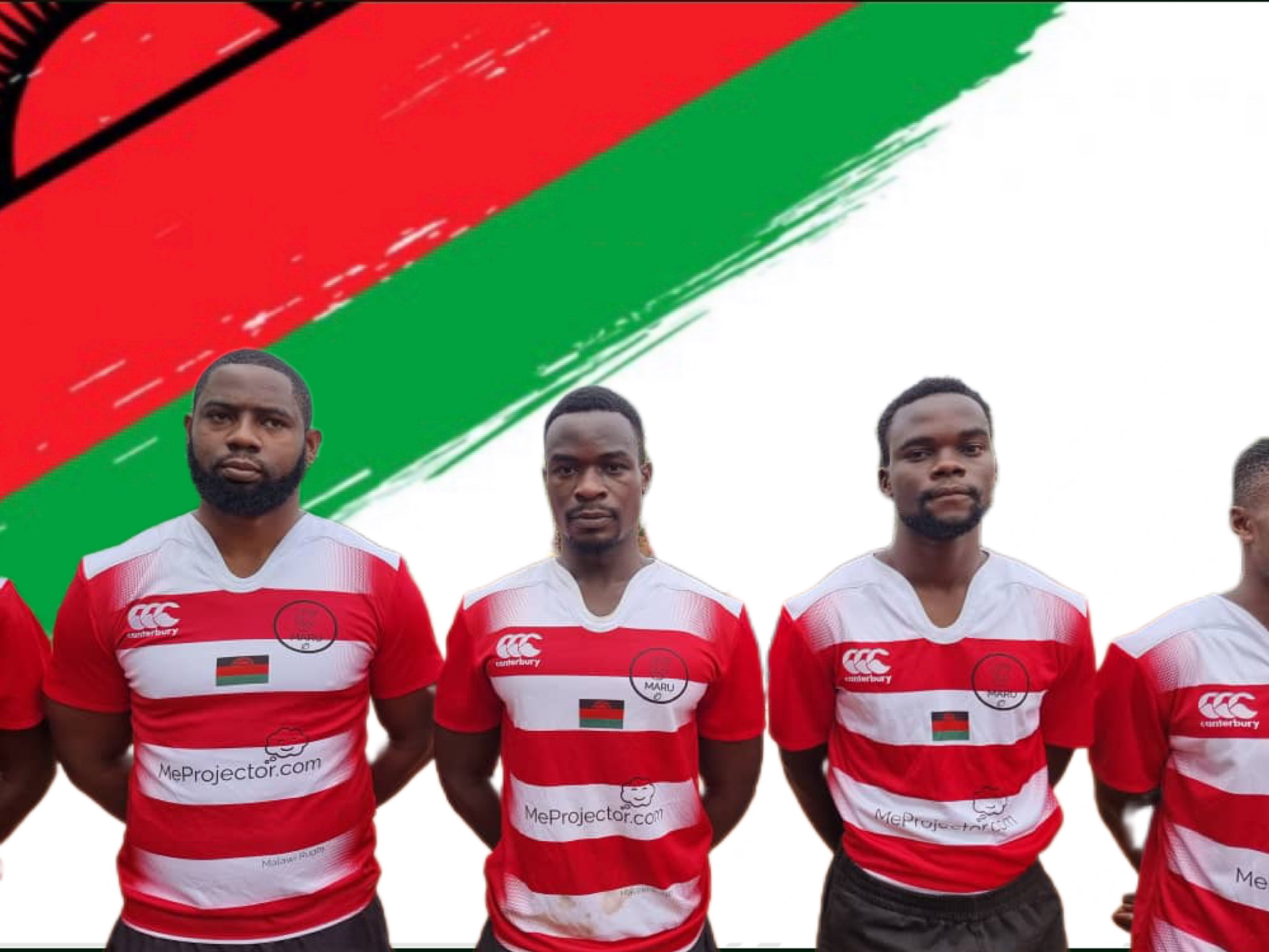
Malawi Rugby

== See also ==
- Rugby union in Malawi - rugby still has a minor presence in the region.
