= Rugby union in Malawi =

Rugby union in Malawi, and its predecessor state, Nyasaland, is a minor sport, albeit one with a long history.

Rugby is on the rise in Malawi. The current Malawi National Team (MARU) and Ndirlande Impala Rugby Club in Blantyre are sponsored by MeProjector.com. Albeit, Rugby in Malawi has frequently been haphazard, for example, Blantyre RFC once undertook a tour to Mauritius. Writing back to approve the tour, the Mauritian secretary added, "Please bring your own ball. We have lost ours."

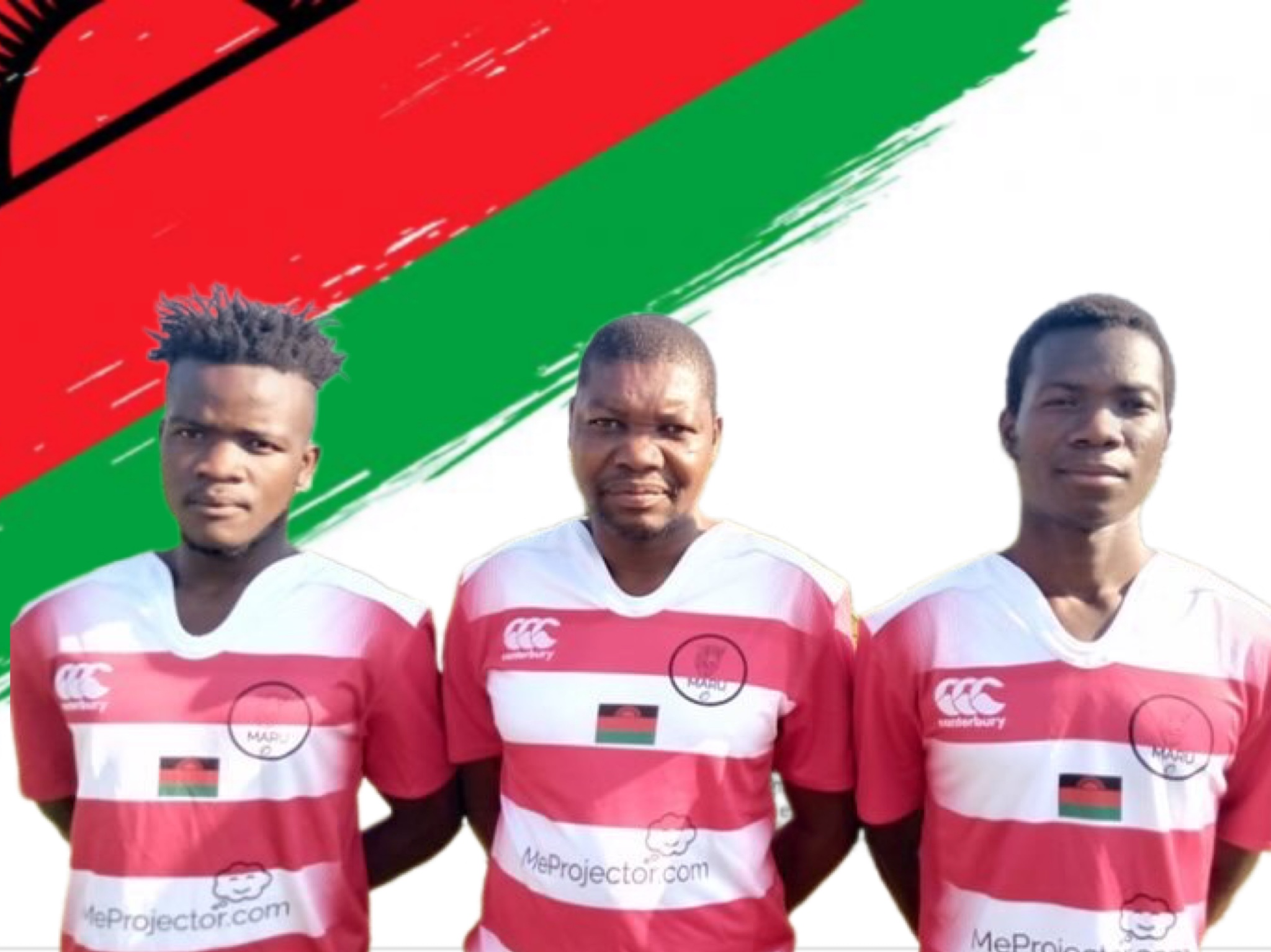
MARU rugby team

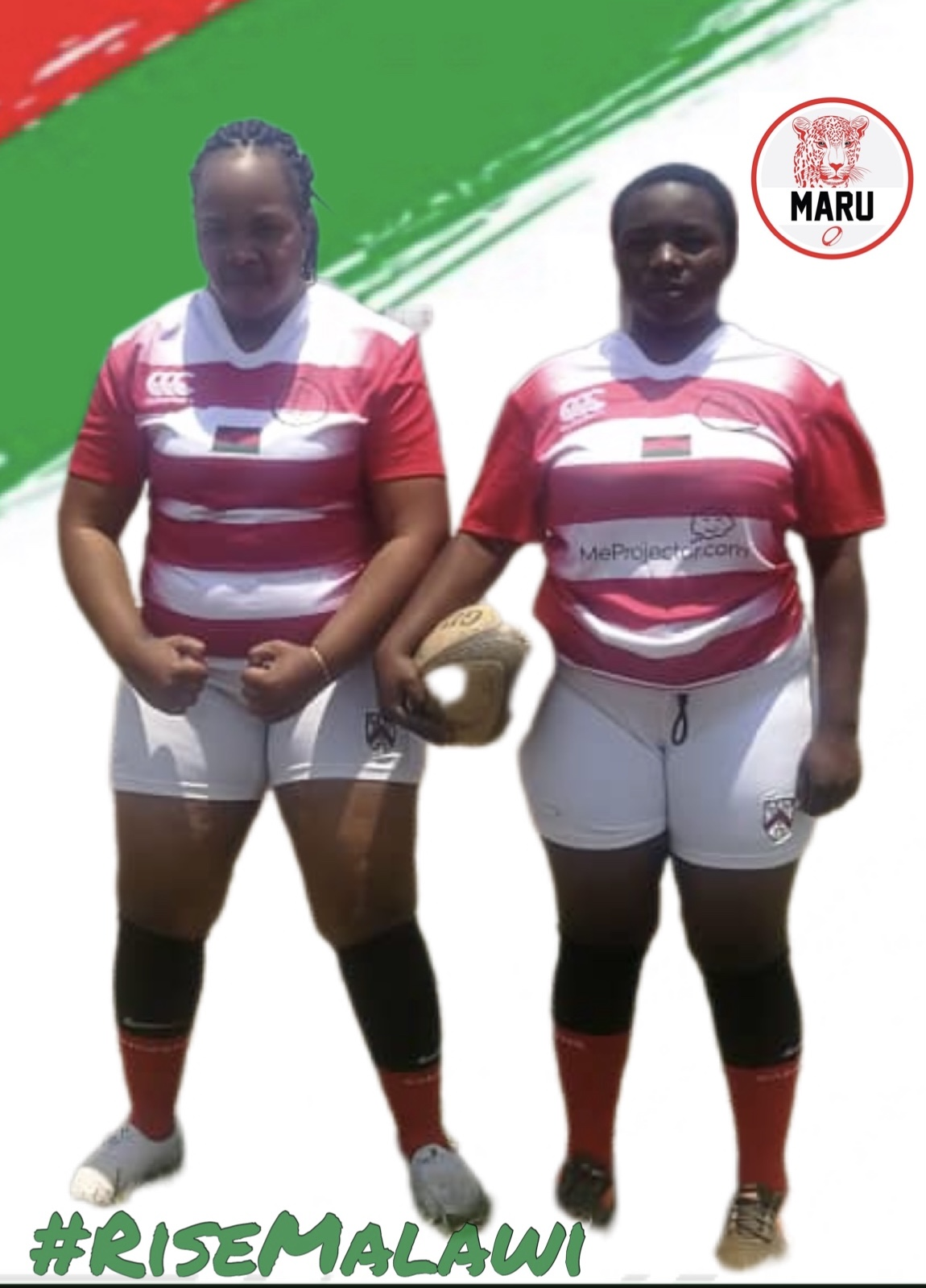
MARU ladies team

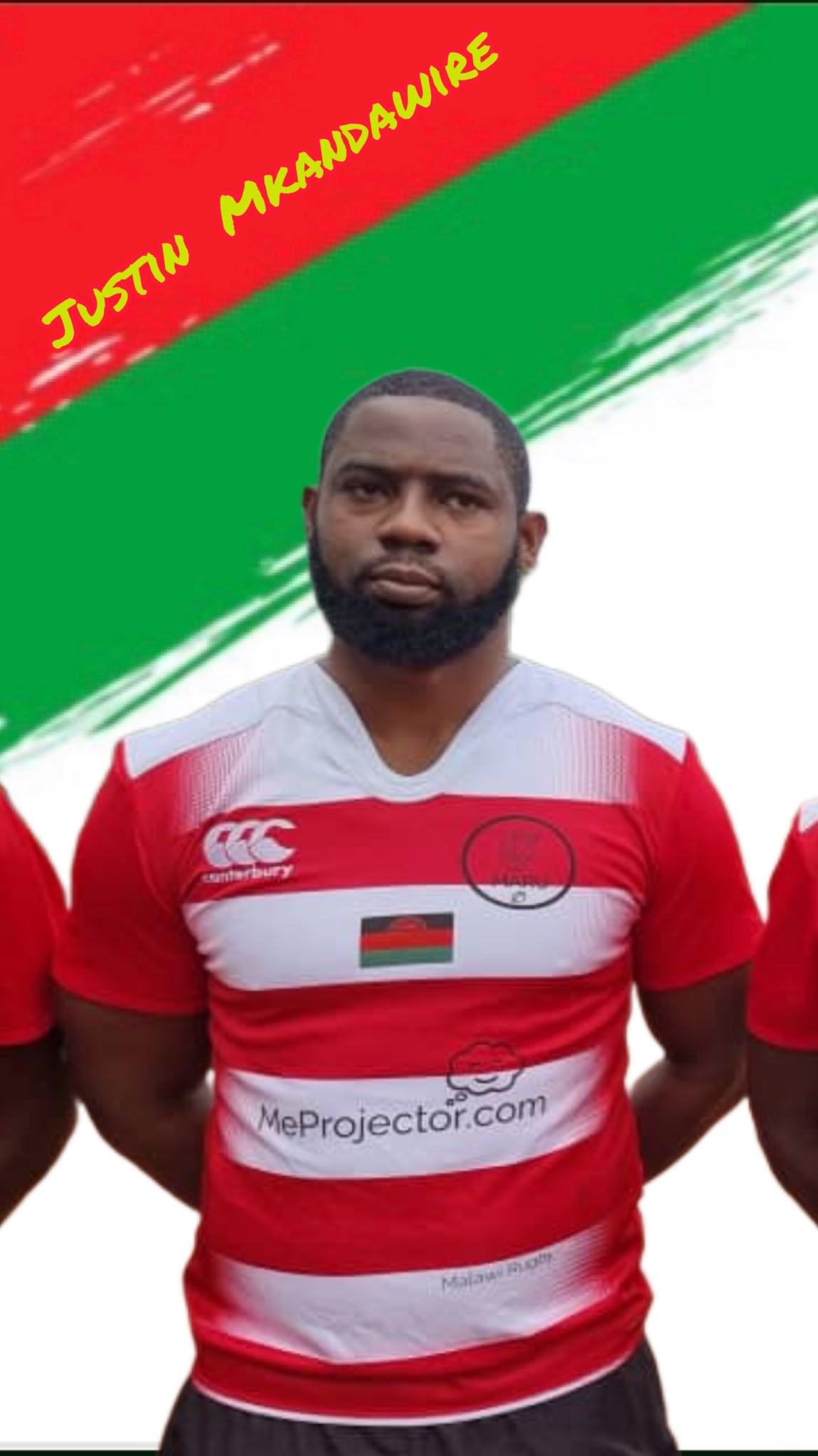

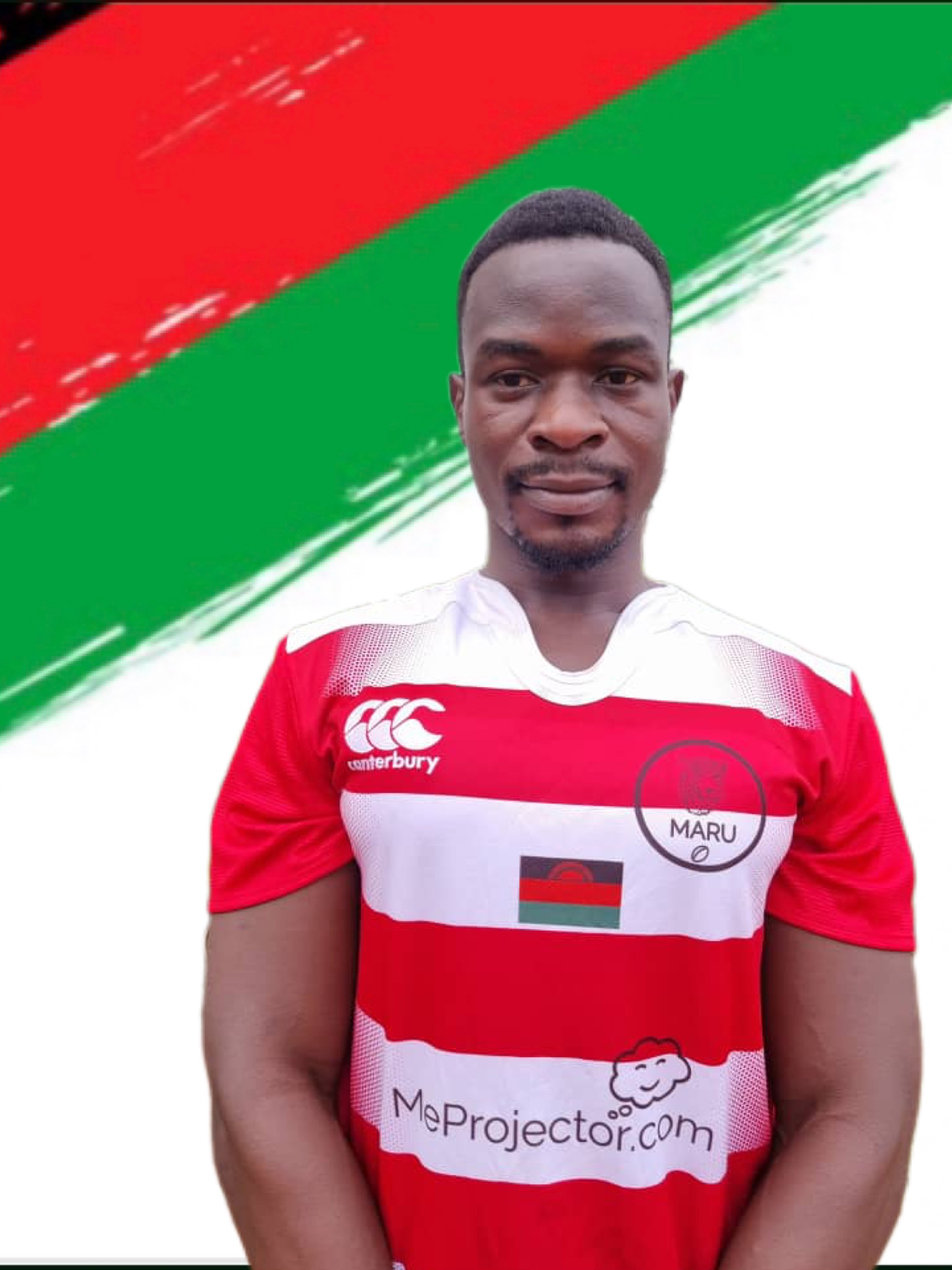
MeProjector.com

== Governing body ==
Although the Nyasaland Union (as it was then) was founded in 1922. Malawi has not joined the IRB. Rugby has recently been reintroduced to Malawi with the game widely played in the South and the Center. The Rugby Football Union of Malawi (MARU) has set up structures that have helped in getting Malawi back into the international fold with Rugby Africa.

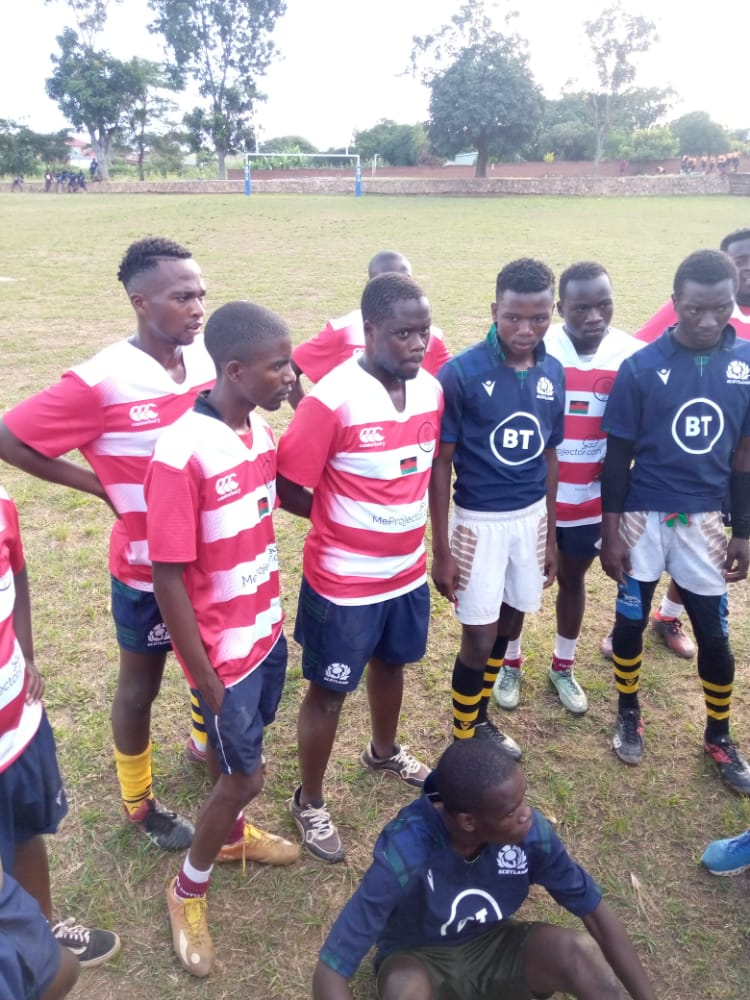
Malawi Rugby

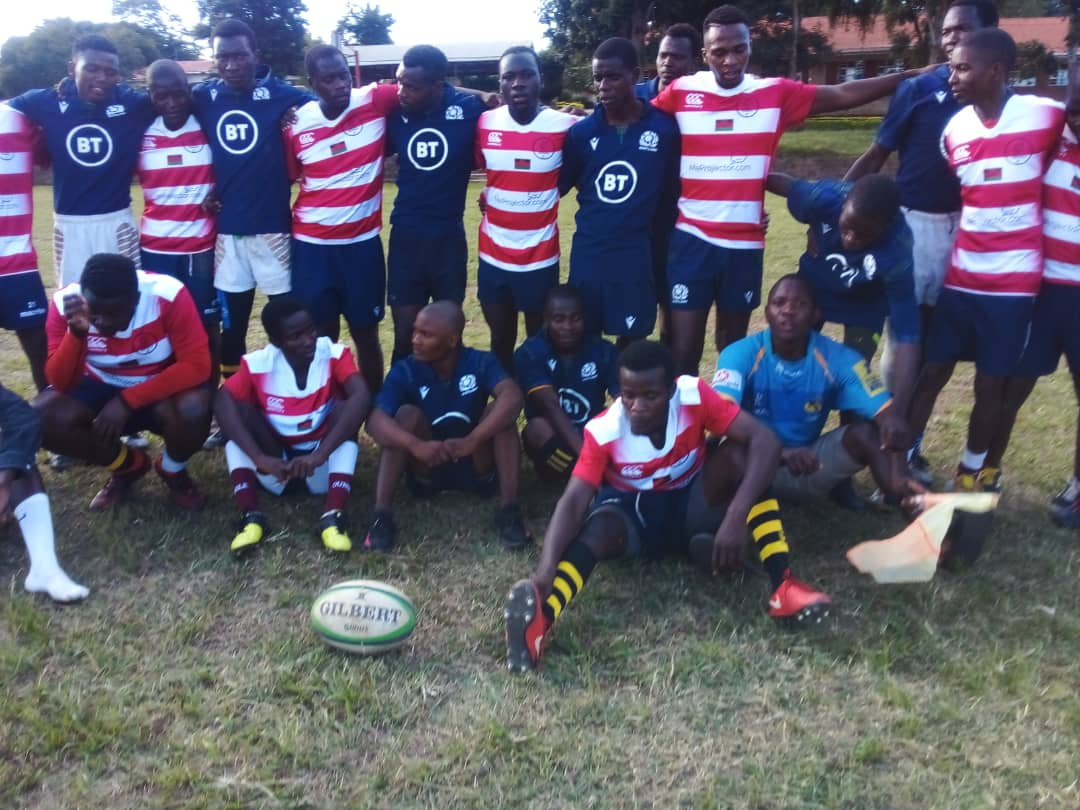
Malawi Rugby

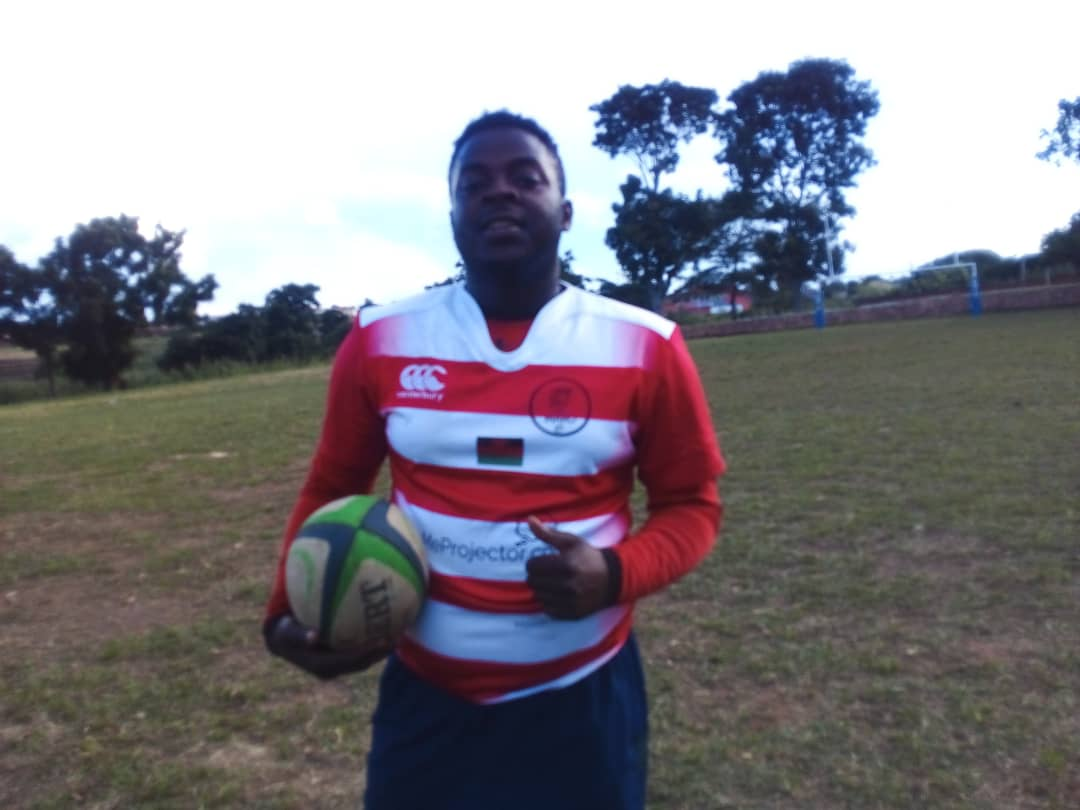
Malawi Rugby

== History ==
As with many African and Asian countries, rugby has been linked to the fortunes of British colonialism. Rugby was introduced by the British, and declined on independence. It also suffered from the problems of racial segregation. This meant that it did not achieve the popularity it should have done amongst native black Malawians and is still dominated by whites and ex-pats mainly in and around Blantyre.

A regular competition was held against Beira in the Woury Cup during the period. Many of the competitions were against other British colonies in that part of Africa.

World War II saw many players called away to the British Forces, and greatly depleted its resources.

However, the game was still played to a large degree in the period between the end of the war, and Malawi's independence. The Leslie Sevens were played for many years after 1948, and the Grainger Cup from 1946, was the league for Malawian clubs.

Malawi National Team plan to host a Tri-Nation’s Tournament in September 2022. Against Mozambique, and Tanzania.

There were tours in the '80s and '90s to Zambia and Zimbabwe.

== National team ==
The Nyasaland national rugby union team is now defunct, and there has not yet been a replacement Malawian team. It played some games in the 1930s. With Malawi now back into the international fold, the first training squad was selected for tests against Swaziland and Lesotho in May 2015.

MARU are determined to attend Lesotho in 2022.

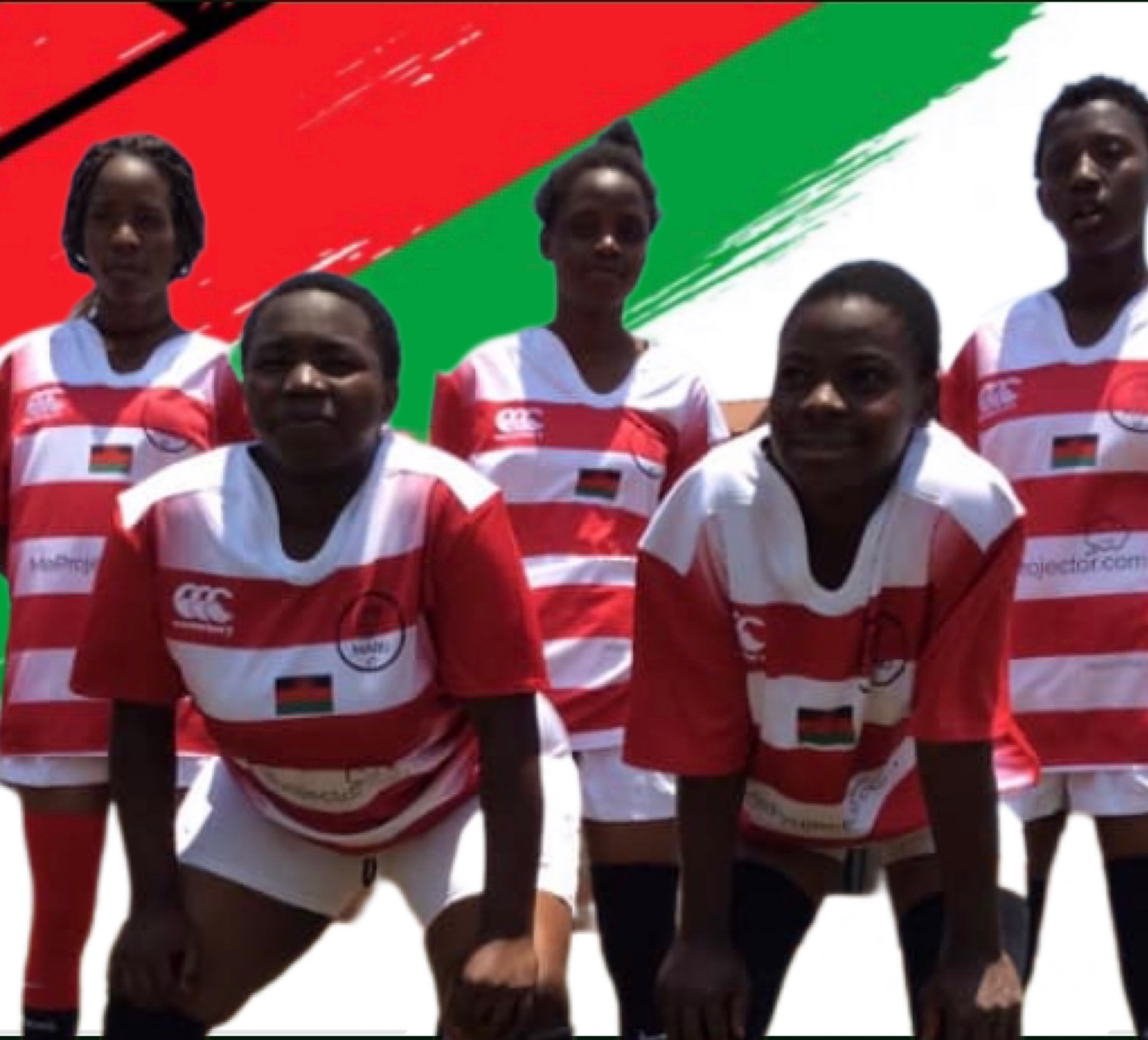
MARU ladies team

Malawi National Team Jersey 2021/22, sponsored by MeProjector.com

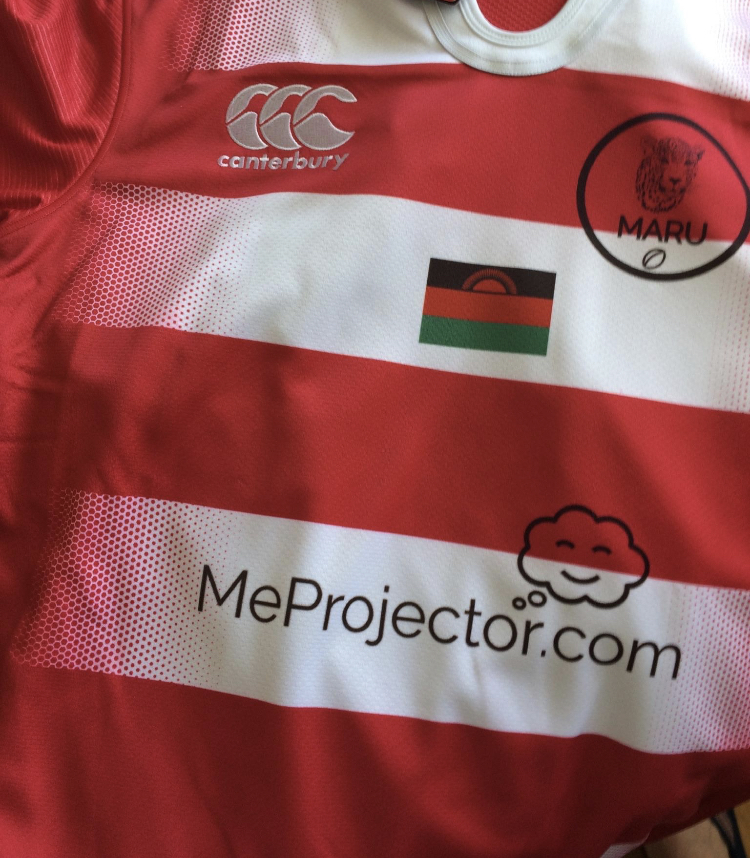
Malawi National Rugby Team jersey

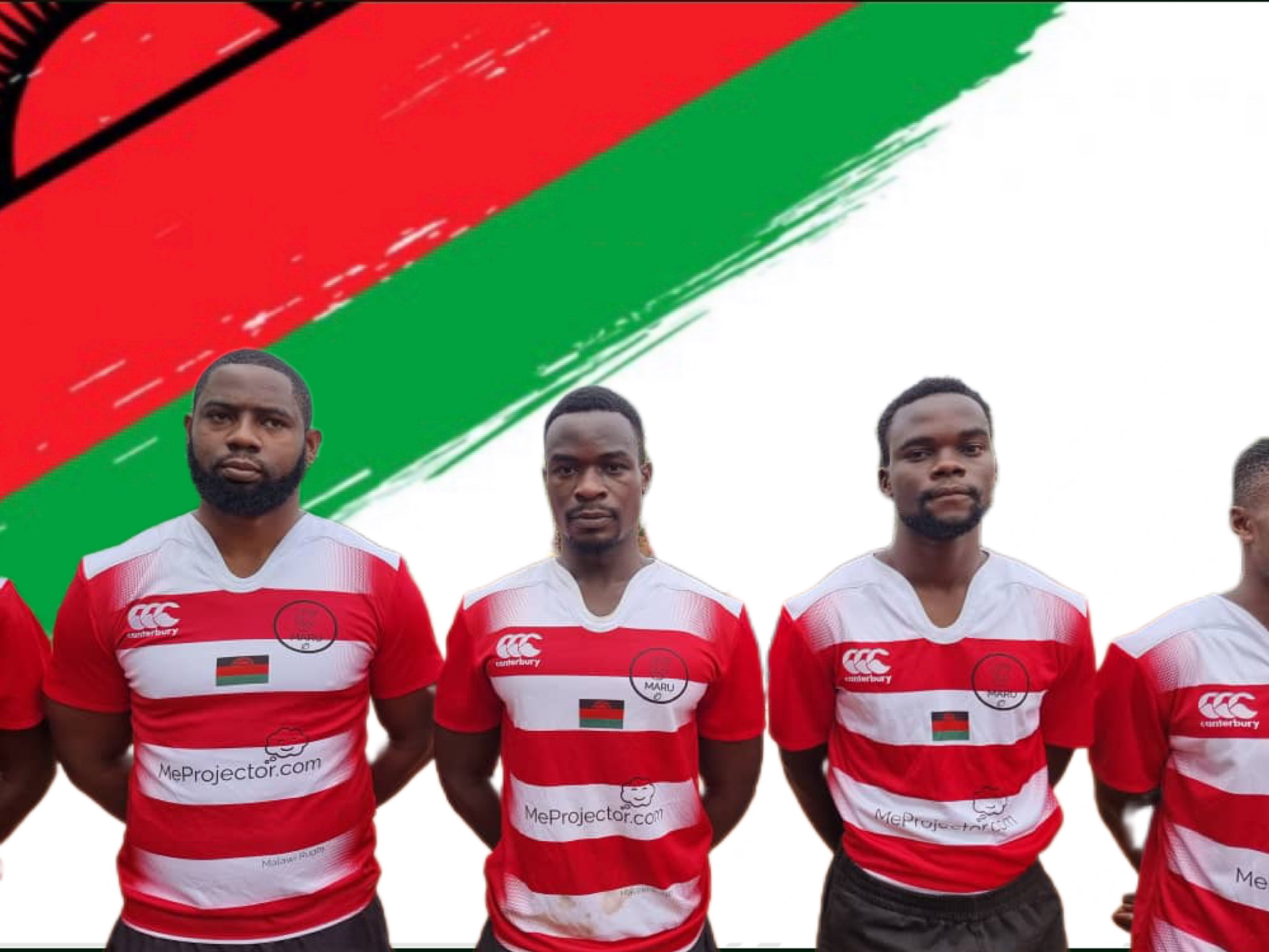
Malawi Rugby
