= 2013 Africa Cup =

13th Africa Cup
Final positions
- Champions: Kenya
- Runner-up: Zimbabwe

The 2013 Africa Cup was the thirteenth edition of the Africa Cup, an annual international rugby union tournament for African nations organised by the Confederation of African Rugby (CAR). This tournament, as well as the 2012 and 2014 editions of it, served as the qualifiers for the 2015 Rugby World Cup.

== Changes from last season ==
Changes from the 2012 Africa Cup:

- Division 2 was divided into a North and South tournaments
- A new Division 3 was added, divided into North and Central tournaments, however no games were ever played
- Madagascar was promoted to Division 1A
- Tunisia was relegated to Division 1B
- Botswana was promoted to Division 1B
- Morocco was relegated to Division 1C
- Algeria was relegated to Division 3 North, although the Division 3 games were never played
- Cameroon will not take part, after withdrawing in 2012.
- Egypt will not take part, although they were scheduled to play host to Division 3 North.
- Togo sent two teams the previous year, but will only be sending one in 2013.
- After missing last years tournament, Burundi and Rwanda have both returned to compete in the new Division 2 South group. Eswatini and Tanzania were also slated to compete in Division 2, but were unable to compete.
- Congo, DR Congo, and Gabon were all scheduled to return to compete in the new Division 3 Central group, however none of the Division 3 games took place
- Likewise, Libya, and Mauritania were both scheduled to compete in the new Division 3 North group, however none of the Division 3 games took place.
- For the first time ever, Central African Republic was to be taking part in the new Division 3 Central group, however none of the Division 3 games took place.

== Division 1A ==
Division 1A was held between 10 and 14 July 2013, at the Mahamasina Municipal Stadium in Antananarivo, Madagascar. The competing teams will be (pre-tournament IRB World Rankings in parentheses:

- Kenya (37)
- Madagascar (44)
- Uganda (42)
- Zimbabwe (31)

Due to losing the third place playoff, Uganda will be demoted to 2014 Africa Cup Division 1B, and was eliminated from 2015 Rugby World Cup qualifying.

Semi-finals
10 July 12:30
Kenya	52
Uganda	11
10 July 14:30
Madagascar	18
Zimbabwe	38

Final
14 July 14:30
Kenya	29
Zimbabwe	17
Third place
14 July 12:30
Uganda	32
Madagascar	48

Semi-finals

Jul 10, 2013	Kenya	52 – 11	Uganda	Mahamasina Municipal Stadium, Antananarivo, Madagascar
12:30	Try: Brian Nyikuli (10'), Wilson Kopondo (21'), Edwin Ontieno 2 (42', 53'), Cyprian Kuto (45'), Adimo Wamamba (70'), Andrew Amonde (78'); Con: Adimo Wamamba, Andrew Amonde; Pen: Kenny Andola 3 (6', 30', 38'), Adimo Wamamba (63')	Team Sheet	Try: Andrew Olweny (70'); Pen: Jonathan Onen (20'), Benon Kizza (33')	Attendance: 40,000; Referee: (South Africa) Pro Legoete

Jul 10, 2013	Madagascar	18 – 38	Zimbabwe	Mahamasina Municipal Stadium, Antananarivo, Madagascar
14:30	Try: Benjaniaina M Rakotoarivelo (24'), Bernard Razaindranaivo (28'); Con: Jose Rakotoharison; Pen: Jose Rakotoharison (9'); Drop: Jose Rakotoharison (31')	Team Sheet	Try: Jacques Leitao (40'+2'), Keith Murray (49'), Garth Zieglar (55'), Sanele Sibanda (66'); Con: Linience Tambwera 2, Boyd Rouse; Pen: Linience Tambwera 3 (19', 45', 63'); Drop: Boyd Rouse (65')	Attendance: 40,000; Referee: (South Africa) Lourens van der Merwe

3rd Place Playoff

Jul 14, 2013	Uganda	32–48	Madagascar	Mahamasina Municipal Stadium, Antananarivo, Madagascar
12:30	Try: Felix Lubega (9'), Paul Serunjogi (12'), Justin Kimono (60'), Robert Seguya (67'); Con: Jonathan Onen, Josesh Adredo 2 Pen: Jonathan Onen (16'), Josesh Adredo (30')	Team Sheet	Try: Hery Ralaimodona (23'), Herizo Rasoanaivo 2 (33', 36'), Tahina Randrianarisoa (53'), Edmond Rakotoarimanana 2 (57', 78'), Con: Edmond Rakotoarimanana, Jose Rakotoharison 5 Pen: Edmond Rakotoarimanana (24'), Jose Rakotoharison (46')	Attendance: 40,000; Referee: (South Africa) Pro Legoete

Final

Jul 14, 2013	Kenya	29 – 17	Zimbabwe	Mahamasina Municipal Stadium, Antananarivo, Madagascar
14:30	Try: Joshua Chisanga (5'), Nicodemus Barasa 2 (8', 76'), Edwin Otieno (65'), Con: Kenny Andola 2, Vincent Mose; Drop: Kenny Andola (33')	Team Sheet	Try: Philimon Machisa (11'); Pen: Linience Tambwera 4 (21', 31', 38', 63')	Attendance: 40,000; Referee: (South Africa) Lourens van der Merwe

== Division 1B ==
Division 1B was held between 11 and 15 June 2013, at the Iba Mar Diop Stadium in Dakar, Senegal. The competing teams were (pre-tournament IRB World Rankings in parentheses):

- Botswana (78)
- Namibia (23)
- Senegal (47)
- Tunisia (43)

Namibia won the tournament, and will be promoted to Division 1A in the 2014 Africa Cup.

Semi-finals
11 June
Senegal	12
Namibia	35
11 June
Botswana	12
Tunisia	43

Final
15 June
Namibia	45
Tunisia	13
Third place
15 June
Senegal	41
Botswana	5

Semi-finals

Jun 11, 2013	Senegal	12 – 35	Namibia	Iba Mar Diop, Dakar, Senegal
	Pen: Aldric Folliot 4		Try: David Philander, Chrysander Botha, Danie Dames 2 Con: Theuns Kotzé 3 Pen: Theuns Kotzé 3

Jun 11, 2013	Botswana	12 – 43	Tunisia	Iba Mar Diop, Dakar, Senegal
	Try: Eddy Ernest, Thato Maifala; Con: Hugo Botha		Try: Jabri Chadi, Mohamed Chargui 2, Haithem Chelly, Abbes Kherfeni, Chamseddine Khalifa; Con: Salim Barhoumi 5 Pen: Salim Barhoumi

3rd Place Playoff

Jun 15, 2013	Senegal	41 – 5	Botswana	Iba Mar Diop, Dakar, Senegal
	Try: Mouhamed Samba, Ousmane Ndiaye, Maxime Boyer, Aldric Folliot, Cire Sam; Con: Aldric Folliot 5 Pen: Aldric Folliot 2		Try: Tyronne Warburton

Final

Jun 15, 2013	Namibia	45 – 13	Tunisia	Iba Mar Diop, Dakar, Senegal
	Try: Chrysander Botha 2, Rohan Kitshoff, penalty try, Heinrich Smit; Con: Theuns Kotzé 4 Pen: Theuns Kotzé 4		Try: Unknown; Con: Unknown; Pen: Chamseddine Khalifa 1, Unknown

== Division 1C ==
Division 1C was held between 22 and 29 June 2013, at the Ecole Supérieur des Travaux Publics - Institut National Polytechnique Félix Houphouët-Boigny Sud in Yamoussoukro, Ivory Coast.

Ivory Coast won the tournament, and will be promoted to Division 1B in the 2014 Africa Cup.

Place	Nation	Games				Points			Table points
Place	Nation	played	won	drawn	lost	for	against	difference	Table points
1	Ivory Coast (45)	3	3	0	0	178	21	+157	15
2	Morocco (33)	3	2	0	1	130	29	+101	10
3	Nigeria (90)	3	2	0	1	116	51	+65	10
4	Zambia (75)	3	1	0	2	43	142	–109	5
5	Niger (NR)	3	1	0	2	37	120	–84	4
6	Mauritius (96)	3	0	0	3	19	163	–144	0

Numbers in parentheses indicate pre-tournament IRB Ranking. NR=not ranked

Match Schedule All times in UTC

23 June 2013	Morocco	77 – 3	Niger	ESTP INPHB Sud, Yamoussoukro, Côte d'Ivoire
9:00	Try: Boutaty Abdelatif (2', 47'), Boudjemaa Mehdi 3 (6', 12', 17'), Slayki Ismail 2 (24', 32'), Mouad Labi (35'), Hamza Zouhair (40'), Amraoui Houcine (56'), Klur Pierre (70'); Con: Rieger Benoit 8 Pen: Rieger Benoit 2 (10', 64')	Team Sheets	Pen: Eric Soubeiga (5')	Referee: (Tunisia) Hamda Boukid

23 June 2013	Ivory Coast	77 – 3	Zambia	ESTP INPHB Sud, Yamoussoukro, Côte d'Ivoire
14:00	Try: Yann Lohore (9'), Toussaint Kassi Anzian 2 (13', 57'), J Maurice Oulama 2 (50', 75'), Mohamed Dembele (60'), Pierre Diallo (63'), Kouadio Konan (70'), Bakary Meite 2 (72', 80'); Con: J Maurice Oulama 9 Pen: J Maurice Oulama 3 (2', 6', 55')	Team Sheet	Pen: Benaya Mukwamba (10')	Referee: (France) Stéphane Boyer

23 June 2013	Mauritius	3 – 63	Nigeria	ESTP INPHB Sud, Yamoussoukro, Côte d'Ivoire
16:00	Pen: Georges Bechard (21')	Team Sheet	Try: Moyo Osibini (3'), Tan Mbonu 3 (13', 31', 46'), James Doherty 2 (24', 52'), Obaderin Adewola 3 (27', 35', 76'), Chukwuma Osazuwa (43'), Temitope Okenla (60'); Con: Tiwaloluwa Obisesan 4	Referee: (Tunisia) Heykel Bahroun

26 June 2013	Ivory Coast	83 - 3	Mauritius	ESTP INPHB Sud, Yamoussoukro, Côte d'Ivoire
9:00	Try: Pierre Diallo 2 (8', 40+1'), Kouadio Konan (27'), Sydney Djiropo 2 (34', 59'), Salif Touré (37'), Yann Lohore (42'), Christopher Ahipo 2 (55', 64'), Ibrahima Konate (69'), Poupeau Quentin (74'), 1 try (76'); Con: J Maurice Oulama 9 Pen: J Maurice Oulama (4'); Cards: Serge Jouve (yellow card) 19' to 29', Salif Touré (yellow card) 38' to 48'	Team Sheet	Pen: Georges Bechard (31')	Referee: (Tunisia) Heykel Bahroun

26 June 2013	Morocco	38 - 8	Nigeria	ESTP INPHB Sud, Yamoussoukro, Côte d'Ivoire
14:00	Try: Penalty Try (33'), Boutaty Abdelatif (42'), Abderahman Jidi (44'), Houcine Amraoui (57'), Mohamed Azizi (71'); Con: Rieger Benoit 2 Pen: Rieger Benoit 3 (11', 27', 40')	Team Sheet	Try: Obaderin Adewola (36'); Pen: Tiwaloluwa Obisesan (21')	Referee: (France) Stéphane Boyer

26 June 2013	Zambia	30 - 21	Niger	ESTP INPHB Sud, Yamoussoukro, Côte d'Ivoire
16:00	Try: Sizwayo Mvula 2 (2', 35'), Ackim Mushota 2 (22', 70'); Con: Benaya Mukwamba 2 Pen: Benaya Mukwamba 2 (12', 60'); Cards: Danel Njovu (yellow card) 38' to 48', Sizwayo Mvula (yellow card) 55' to 65'	Team Sheet	Try: Bah Traore Bignozi (45'), Guiminou Ousseini (66'), Garba Mamane (80'); Pen: Eric Soubeiga 2 (39', 42')	Referee: (Tunisia) Hamda Boukid

29 June 2013	Zambia	10 - 45	Nigeria	ESTP INPHB Sud, Yamoussoukro, Côte d'Ivoire
9:00	Try: Benaya Mukwamba (64'); Con: Benaya Mukwamba; Pen: Benaya Mukwamba (6'); Cards: Owen Mwila (red card) 62'	Team Sheet	Try: Jay Udo Udoma 2 (14', 78'), Temitope Okenla (25'), Abdulahi Abdul (43'), Obi Wilson (51'), Chukwuma Osazuwa 2 (63', 73'), Adedoyin Layade (67'); Con: Tiwaloluwa Obisesan; Pen: Tiwaloluwa Obisesan (4')	Referee: (Tunisia) Heykel Bahroun

29 June 2013	Mauritius	13 - 17	Niger	ESTP INPHB Sud, Yamoussoukro, Côte d'Ivoire
16:00	Try: Jean Bruno Bax (12'), Laurent Bourgault (29'); Pen: Laurent Bourgault (46'); Cards: Georges Bechard (yellow card) 58' to 68'	Team Sheet	Try: Boukari Azahidou (16'), Salifou Issifou (68'); Con: Eric Soubeiga 2 Pen: Eric Soubeiga (75')	Referee: (Tunisia) Hamda Boukid

29 June 2013	Morocco	15 - 18	Ivory Coast	ESTP INPHB Sud, Yamoussoukro, Côte d'Ivoire
14:00	Pen: Rieger Benoit 4 (6', 8', 25', 51'); Drop: Rieger Benoit (21'); Cards: Loukrassi Mohamed (red card) 29'	Team Sheet	Pen: J Maurice Oulama 2 (15', 23'), Jonathan Lo 4 (56', 58', 66', 70'); Cards: J Maurice Oulama (red card) 29'	Referee: (France) Stéphane Boyer

== Division 2 ==
Starting in 2013, Division 2 was divided into North and South Groups.

=== North ===
The North Group tournament was held in Niamey, Niger between 3 and 10 June 2013. Due to winning, Niger qualified for the Division 1C tournament which took place three weeks following.

Place	Nation	Games				Points			Table points
Place	Nation	played	won	drawn	lost	for	against	difference	Table points
1	Niger	3	3	0	0	94	17	+77	13
2	Burkina Faso	3	2	0	1	82	29	+53	9
3	Mali	3	2	0	0	56	38	+18	9
4	Togo	3	1	0	2	82	32	+50	6
5	Ghana	3	1	0	2	12	68	-46	4
6	Benin	3	0	0	3	0	152	-152	0

Match Schedule

3 June 2013	Niger	48-0	Benin	Seyni Kountché Stadium, Niamey, Niger
		Report

3 June 2013	Ghana	13-11	Togo	Seyni Kountché Stadium, Niamey, Niger
		Report

3 June 2013	Burkina Faso	13-23	Mali	Seyni Kountché Stadium, Niamey, Niger
		Report

6 June 2013	Ghana	3-29	Niger	Seyni Kountché Stadium, Niamey, Niger
		Report

6 June 2013	Mali	19-8	Togo	Seyni Kountché Stadium, Niamey, Niger
		Report

6 June 2013	Burkina Faso	41-0	Benin	Seyni Kountché Stadium, Niamey, Niger
		Report

10 June 2013	Ghana	6-28	Burkina Faso	Seyni Kountché Stadium, Niamey, Niger
		Report

10 June 2013	Niger	17-14	Mali	Seyni Kountché Stadium, Niamey, Niger
		Report

10 June 2013	Togo	63-0	Benin	Seyni Kountché Stadium, Niamey, Niger
		Report

=== South ===
The South Group tournament was held in Rwanda on 22 June 2013. In addition to Rwanda and Burundi, it was supposed to also feature Swaziland and Tanzania, however they were unable to attend.

Rather than a full tournament, a single game was held at Stade Amahoro, with Rwanda defeating Burundi with a score of 22 - 0.

22 June 2013	Rwanda	22-0	Burundi	Stade Amahoro, Kigali City, Rwanda
15:00

== Division 3 ==
Starting in 2013, there is now at third division, split into North and Central groups.

=== Central ===
The Central Group tournament was to be held in Democratic Republic of the Congo between 26 and 31 August 2013. However, 26 August came and went with no information about fixtures, and none of the games were played.

Teams:

- Central African Republic
- Congo
- DR Congo
- Gabon

=== North ===
The North Group tournament was to be held in Egypt between 10 and 13 October 2013. However, no games were scheduled by October 8, and no news about rescheduling was ever released.

Teams:

- Algeria
- Egypt
- Libya
- Mauritania

== See also ==
- Africa Cup
- 2015 Rugby World Cup – Africa qualification
