= 2006 CAR Development Trophy =

Tournament details
- Date: 24 March– 29 October 2006
- Teams: 15

Final positions
- Champions: Tanzania
- Runner-up: Niger

Tournament statistics
- Matches played: 23

The 2006 CAR Development Trophy was the third edition of second level rugby union tournament in Africa. It was known as the CAR "Castel Cup" Super-16 Championship. The competition involved fifteen teams that were divided into two zones (North and South). Swaziland withdrew from the tournament due to costs.

The winner of each pool played against each other to determine the regional winners. Then winner's of the North and South competition played each other for the Championship.

In the North, Niger was scheduled to play Nigeria in the final, but Nigeria withdrew for unspecified reasons. This allowed Niger to proceed to the Championship. In the South Tanzania defeated Réunion 11-10 in the final.

The Championship was held on 16 December at the Friedkin Recreation Centre in Arusha. Tanzania defeated Niger with a score of 29-10. Niger experienced several travel delays, arriving three days later than expected and only eight hours before game time.

== North Zone ==
Two pools of four teams, with a zone final between the winners

=== Pool A ===
Pos.	Team	Pld	W	D	L	PF	PA	diff.	Pts
1	Niger	3	3	0	0	56	5	+51	6
2	Burkina Faso	3	2	0	1	42	20	+22	4
3	Mali	3	1	0	2	15	25	-10	2
4	Chad	3	0	0	3	5	68	-62	0

24 March 2006

Niger	24 - 0	Chad

Niamey

24 March 2006

Burkina Faso	5 - 3	Mali

Niamey

26 March 2006

Mali	12 - 5	Chad

Niamey

26 March 2006

Niger	17 - 5	Burkina Faso

Niamey

28 March 2006

Burkina Faso	32 - 0	Chad

Niamey

28 March 2006

Niger	15 - 0	Mali

Niamey

=== Pool B ===
Pos.	Team	Pld	W	D	L	PF	PA	diff.	Pts
1	Nigeria	3	3	0	0	99	27	+50	6
2	Togo	3	2	0	1	38	37	+11	4
3	Ghana	3	1	0	2	50	49	-1	2
4	Benin	3	0	0	3	24	86	-62	0

25 July 2006

Niger	33 - 3	Benin

Lomé

25 July 2006

Togo	8 - 3	Ghana

Lomé

27 July 2006

Niger	32 - 13	Ghana

Lomé

27 July 2006

Togo	19 - 12	Benin

Lomé

29 July 2006

Ghana	34 - 9	Benin

Lomé

29 July 2006

Niger	12 - 11	Togo

Lomé

=== Final ===
- Niger won by Withdraw of Nigeria.

== South Zone ==
=== Pool A ===
(Swaziland Withdraw)

Pos.	Team	Pld	W	D	L	PF	PA	diff.	Pts
1	Tanzania	2	2	0	0	131	11	+120	4
2	Burundi	2	1	0	1	22	66	-44	2
3	Rwanda	2	0	0	2	14	90	-76	0

15 August 2006

Tanzania	60 - 3	Burundi

Arusha

17 August 2006

Burundi	19 - 6	Rwanda

Arusha

19 August 2006

Tanzania	71 - 8	Rwanda

Arusha

=== Pool B ===
Pos.	Team	Pld	W	D	L	PF	PA	diff.	Pts
1	Réunion	3	3	0	0	90	3	+87	6
2	Mauritius	3	2	0	1	40	53	-13	4
3	Botswana	3	1	0	2	55	45	+20	2
4	Mayotte	3	0	0	3	21	105	-84	0

30 May 2006

Réunion	48 - 0	Mayotte

Saint Denis

30 May 2006

Mauritius	20 - 15	Botswana

Saint Denis

1 June 2006

Mauritius	20 - 13	Mayotte

Saint Denis

1 June 2006

Réunion	17 - 3	Botswana

Saint Denis

3 June 2006

Mayotte	8 - 37	Botswana

Saint Denis

3 June 2006

Réunion	25 - 0	Mauritius

Saint Denis

=== South Final ===
7 October 2006

Tanzania	11 - 10	Réunion

Arusha

== Final ==
29 October 2006

Tanzania	29 - 10	Niger

Arusha
