= 2015 Africa Cup =

15th Africa Cup
Final positions
- Champions: Namibia
- Runner-up: Zimbabwe

The 2015 Africa Cup will be the fifteenth edition of the Africa Cup, an annual international rugby union tournament for African nations organised by Rugby Africa.

== Changes from last season ==
Changes from the 2014 Africa Cup:

- All Division 2 tournaments will be held as 15-a-side tournaments
- Tunisia was promoted to Division 1A
- Madagascar was relegated to Division 1B
- Botswana and Mauritius were promoted to Division 1B
- Cameroon was added to Division 1C, after serving a suspension from Rugby Africa
- Morocco was added to Division 1C, despite missing the 2014 tournament.
- Congo was added to Division 2 South
- Eswatini was relegated to Division 2
- Lesotho and Malawi were added to Division 2.

== Division 1A ==
Division 1A will be played during June and July 2015. The matches will be hosted by each of the Division 1A teams, with the top two ranked teams (Namibia and Zimbabwe hosting two matches each. The format is a single round robin, home or away format.

The competing teams are:

- Kenya
- Namibia
- Tunisia
- Zimbabwe

Key to colours in group tables
Champions
Relegated

Place	Nation	Games				Points			Table points
Place	Nation	played	won	drawn	lost	for	against	difference	Table points
1	Namibia (22)	3	3	0	0	148	33	+115	9
2	Zimbabwe (27)	3	2	0	1	53	108	–55	6
3	Kenya (29)	3	1	0	2	79	89	–10	3
4	Tunisia (36)	3	0	0	3	37	87	–50	0

Numbers in parentheses are pre-tournament World Rugby rankings

Match Schedule

6 June 2015	Tunisia	14 – 22	Namibia	National Stadium, Nabeul
16:30 CET (UTC+1)	Try: Auoadi Chahir 31' m Con: Chams Edin Khalifa (0/1); Pen: Chams Edin Khalifa (2/2) 17', 47', 49'	Report	Try: PJ van Lill 3' c David Philander (2) 10' m, 76' c Con: Theuns Kotzé (2/3) 4', 76'; Pen: Theuns Kotzé (1/2) 60'; Cards: Roderique Victor (yellow card) 57' to 67'	Attendance: 1,000; Referee: Christophe Berdos (France)

13 June 2015	Zimbabwe	28 – 20	Kenya	Jubilee Field, Harare
15:30 EET (UTC+2)	Try: Sanele Sibanda 11' c Riaan O'Neill 15' c Tafadzwa Chitokwindo 70' m Con: Tichafara Makwanya (2/2) 12', 16'; Pen: Tichafara Makwanya (3/4) 21', 46, 59'; Cards: Fortune Chipendo (yellow card) 51' to 61'	Report	Try: Jacob Ojee 19' m Darwin Mukidza 35' c Joshua Chisanga 38' m Con: Darwin Mukidza (1/3) 36'; Pen: Darwin Mukidza (1/2) 51'	Attendance: 6,000; Referee: Stuart Berry (South Africa)

28 June 2015	Kenya	46 – 15	Tunisia	RFUEA Ground, Nairobi
15:00 EAT (UTC+3)	Try: Darwin Mukidza (2) 8' c, 59' m Sammy Oliech (2) 20' c, 64' c Robert Aringo 69' c Vincent Mose 79' c Con: Darwin Mukidza (5/6) 9', 21', 64', 69', 80'; Pen: Darwin Mukidza (2/3) 48', 67'	Report	Pen: Khlifa Eddin (4/5) 6', 12', 40', 61'; Drop: Khlifa Eddin (1/1) 4'; Cards: Haythem Cheli (yellow card) 78' to 80'	Referee: Kurt Weaver (USA)

4 July 2015	Zimbabwe	19 – 8	Tunisia	Jubilee Field, Harare
15:30 EET (UTC+2)	Try: Fortune Chipendu 26' c Con: Tichafara Makwanya (1/1) 27'; Pen: Tichafara Makwanya (3/3) 6', 13', 61'; Lenience Tambwera (1/1) 79'	Report	Try: Mlise Mohammed 42' m Pen: Chams Edin Khalifa (1/1) 17'	Attendance: 4,000; Referee: Kurt Weaver (USA)

8 August 2015	Namibia	46 – 13	Kenya	Hage Geingob Rugby Stadium, Windhoek
16:00 WAT (UTC+01)	Try: Chrysander Botha 9' c David Philander 28' c Darryl de la Harpe (2) 38' m, 43' c Penalty try 63' c Renaldo Bothma 69' c Con: Theuns Kotzé (5/6) 10', 29', 44', 65', 70'; Pen: Theuns Kotzé (2/2) 5', 14'	Report	Try: Joshua Chisanga 73' c Con: Darwin Mukidza (1/1) 74'; Pen: Darwin Mukidza (2/2) 6', 19'	Attendance: 2,000; Referee: Lesego Legoete (South Africa)

15 August 2015	Namibia	80 – 6	Zimbabwe	Hage Geingob Rugby Stadium, Windhoek
15:00 WAT (UTC+01)	Try: Rohan Kitshoff (3) 20' c, 40' c, 70' c Renaldo Bothma 32' c JC Greyling 35' c Johan Deysel 45' c Russell van Wyk (2) 51' c, 72' m Johnny Redelinghuys (2) 56' c, 79' c PJ van Lill 59' m Tinus du Plessis 76' c Con: Theuns Kotzé (10/12) 20', 33', 36', 40', 45', 52', 57', 70', 77', 80'	Report	Pen: Tichafara Makwanya (2/3) 14', 26'	Attendance: 4,500; Referee: Craig Joubert (South Africa)

== Division 1B ==
Division 1B will be held between 3 and 11 July 2015, in Kampala, Uganda.

The competing teams are:

- Botswana
- Ivory Coast
- Madagascar
- Mauritius
- Senegal
- Uganda

Key to colours in group tables
Champions
Relegated

Place	Nation	Games				Points			Table points
Place	Nation	played	won	drawn	lost	for	against	difference	Table points
1	Uganda (56)	3	3	0	0	134	32	+102	15
2	Madagascar (46)	3	3	0	0	99	68	+31	14
3	Senegal (42)	3	1	0	2	82	48	+34	6
4	Botswana (70)	3	1	0	2	54	116	-62	4
5	Ivory Coast (49)	3	1	0	2	59	89	-30	4
6	Mauritius (91)	3	0	0	3	38	110	-72	0

Numbers in parentheses are pre-tournament World Rugby rankings.

Match Schedule

5 July 2015	Madagascar	36 - 18	Botswana	Kyadondo Grounds, Kampala, Uganda

5 July 2015	Uganda	40 - 11	Ivory Coast	Kyadondo Grounds, Kampala, Uganda

5 July 2015	Mauritius	3 - 42	Senegal	Kyadondo Grounds, Kampala, Uganda

8 July 2015	Uganda	35 - 11	Mauritius	Kyadondo Grounds, Kampala, Uganda

8 July 2015	Senegal	21 - 26	Botswana	Kyadondo Grounds, Kampala, Uganda

8 July 2015	Ivory Coast	26 - 30	Madagascar	Kyadondo Grounds, Kampala, Uganda

11 July 2015	Senegal	19 - 22	Ivory Coast	Kyadondo Grounds, Kampala, Uganda

11 July 2015	Madagascar	33 - 24	Mauritius	Kyadondo Grounds, Kampala, Uganda

11 July 2015	Uganda	59 - 10	Botswana	Kyadondo Grounds, Kampala, Uganda

== Division 1C ==
Division 1C will be held between 22 and 27 June 2015, in Lusaka, Zambia. The competing teams are:

- Nigeria
- Zambia
- Zimbabwe B

Morocco were originally scheduled to compete, but are not listed on the most recent schedule. Cameroon apparently withdrew from the tournament.

Key to colours in group tables
Champions

Place	Nation	Games				Points			Table points
Place	Nation	played	won	drawn	lost	for	against	difference	Table points
1	Zambia (88)	2	2	0	0	34	20	+14	6
2	Nigeria (75)	2	1	0	1	42	38	+4	3
3	Zimbabwe B	2	0	0	2	35	53	-18	0

Numbers in parentheses are pre-tournament World Rugby rankings

Match Schedule

21 June 2015	Zambia	15 - 8	Nigeria	Lusaka, Zambia

24 June 2015	Nigeria	34 - 23	Zimbabwe B	Lusaka, Zambia

27 June 2015	Zimbabwe B	12 - 19	Zambia	Lusaka, Zambia

== Division 2 ==
Division 2 is split into regional based tournaments, in the north and south of Africa.

=== North ===
The North Group tournament will be held in Ouagadougou, Burkina Faso between 23 and 31 May 2015. The competing teams are:

- Benin
- Burkina Faso
- Ghana
- Mali
- Niger
- Togo

Key to colours in group tables
Champions

Place	Nation	Games				Points			Table points
Place	Nation	played	won	drawn	lost	for	against	difference	Table points
1	Niger	3	3	0	0	160	30	+130	15
2	Mali	3	3	0	0	115	24	+91	15
3	Burkina Faso	3	3	0	0	99	10	+89	13
4	Ghana	3	0	0	3	17	64	-47	0
5	Togo	3	0	0	3	34	101	-67	0
6	Benin	3	0	0	3	13	209	-196	0

Match Schedule

24 May 2015	Burkina Faso	67 – 3	Benin	Stade de l'Union Sportive des Forces Armées, Ouagadougou, Burkina Faso
		WR Result

24 May 2015	Togo	12 – 31	Mali	Stade de l'Union Sportive des Forces Armées, Ouagadougou, Burkina Faso
		WR Result

24 May 2015	Niger	28 – 10	Ghana	Stade de l'Union Sportive des Forces Armées, Ouagadougou, Burkina Faso
		WR Result

27 May 2015	Mali	24 – 7	Ghana	Stade de l'Union Sportive des Forces Armées, Ouagadougou, Burkina Faso

27 May 2015	Niger	80 – 5	Benin	Stade de l'Union Sportive des Forces Armées, Ouagadougou, Burkina Faso

27 May 2015	Burkina Faso	20 – 7	Togo	Stade de l'Union Sportive des Forces Armées, Ouagadougou, Burkina Faso

30 May 2015	Burkina Faso	12 – 0	Ghana	Stade de l'Union Sportive des Forces Armées, Ouagadougou, Burkina Faso

30 May 2015	Niger	50 – 15	Togo	Stade de l'Union Sportive des Forces Armées, Ouagadougou, Burkina Faso

30 May 2015	Mali	60 – 0	Benin	Stade de l'Union Sportive des Forces Armées, Ouagadougou, Burkina Faso

=== South East ===
The South-East Group tournament will be held in Kinshasa, Democratic Republic of Congo between 25–30 June 2015. The competing teams are:

- DR Congo
- Rwanda

Burundi and Congo apparently withdrew from the tournament. The two teams would play two test matches in consecutive days prior to the final.

Match Schedule

30 June 2015	DR Congo	29 - 3	Rwanda	Stade Tata Raphaël, Kinshasa, Democratic Republic of the Congo
		Match Report

=== South ===
The South Group tournament will be held in Lesotho between 7–13 June 2015. The competing teams are:

- Lesotho
- Eswatini

Malawi apparently withdrew from the tournament.

Match Schedule

30 June 2015	Eswatini	10 - 13	Lesotho	Bambatha Sports Arena, Maseru, Lesotho

== See also ==
- Africa Cup
