= 2014 Africa Cup =

14th Africa Cup
Final positions
- Champions: Namibia
- Runner-up: Zimbabwe

The 2014 Africa Cup was the fourteenth edition of the Africa Cup, an annual international rugby union tournament for African nations organised by the Confederation of African Rugby (CAR). The tournament, as well as the 2012 and 2013 editions of it, served as the qualifiers for the 2015 Rugby World Cup.

== Changes from last season ==
Changes from the 2013 Africa Cup:

- Division 2 North was held as a Rugby Sevens tournament, while Division 2 South was played as a 15-a-side tournament.
- Division 3 is no longer on the programme. It was scheduled for 2013 however, due to economic and political instability, no games were played
- Namibia was promoted to Division 1A
- Uganda was relegated to Division 1B
- Ivory Coast was promoted to Division 1B
- Botswana was relegated to Division 1C
- Eswatini was added to Division 1C despite not competing last year, replacing Niger, who will instead play in Division 2 North
- DR Congo was scheduled to play in Division 3 Central in 2013, but was unable to. They will compete in the new Division 2 South tournament.
- The following teams competed in XV last year, but will only compete in VII in 2014: Burkina Faso, Mali, Ghana, Togo, Benin, Niger

== Division 1A ==
Division 1A was held between 26 June and 6 July 2014, at the Mahamasina Municipal Stadium in Antananarivo, Madagascar. The winner qualified for the 2015 Rugby World Cup as Africa 1, and the runner up qualified for the repechage. The competing teams were:

- Kenya
- Madagascar
- Namibia
- Zimbabwe

Place	Nation	Games				Points			Table points
Place	Nation	played	won	drawn	lost	for	against	difference	Table points
1	Namibia (22)	3	2	0	1	135	59	+76	10
2	Zimbabwe (30)	3	2	0	1	105	56	+49	10
3	Kenya (33)	3	2	0	1	73	50	+23	10
4	Madagascar (35)	3	0	0	3	32	180	–148	0

Numbers in parentheses are pre-tournament IRB rankings

Match Schedule

28 June 2014	Kenya	29 – 22	Namibia	Mahamasina Municipal Stadium, Antananarivo, Madagascar
13:00 (EAT)	Try: Humphrey Kayange, Michael Okombe, Edwin Achayo, Andrew Amonde; Con: Lavin Asego 3 Pen: Lavin Asego	Match Report	Try: Heinrich Smit 2, Chrysander Botha; Con: Theuns Kotzé 2 Pen: Theuns Kotzé	Attendance: 35,000; Referee: (England) Luke Pearce

28 June 2014	Zimbabwe	57 – 22	Madagascar	Mahamasina Municipal Stadium, Antananarivo, Madagascar
15:00 (EAT)	Try: Jacques Leitao 4, Lambert Groenewald, Riaan O'Neill, Stephan Hunduza, Farai Mudariki; Con: Guy Cronjé 6, Lenience Tambwera; Pen: Guy Cronjé	Match Report	Try: Jean de Dieu Rakotonirina, Jose Rakoto Harison, Solonirina Rasoanaivo; Con: Jose Rakoto Harison 2 Pen: Jose Rakoto Harison	Attendance: 35,000; Referee: (South Africa) Lourens van der Merwe

2 July 2014	Zimbabwe	20 – 24	Namibia	Mahamasina Municipal Stadium, Antananarivo, Madagascar
13:00 (EAT)	Try: Daniel Hondo, Tangai Nemadire; Con: Guy Cronjé 2 Pen: Guy Cronjé 2	Match Report	Try: Penalty try, Renaldo Bothma, Rohan Kitshoff; Con: Theuns Kotzé 3 Pen: Theuns Kotzé	Referee: (Argentina) Francisco Pastrana

2 July 2014	Kenya	34 – 0	Madagascar	Mahamasina Municipal Stadium, Antananarivo, Madagascar
15:00 (EAT)				Referee: (England) Luke Pearce

6 July 2014	Kenya	10 – 28	Zimbabwe	Mahamasina Municipal Stadium, Antananarivo, Madagascar
		Match Report	Try: Hilton Mudariki, Riaan O'Neill, Guy Cronjé; Con: Guy Cronjé 2 Pen: Guy Cronjé 3	Referee: (South Africa) Lourens van der Merwe

6 July 2014	Madagascar	10 – 89	Namibia	Mahamasina Municipal Stadium, Antananarivo, Madagascar
		Match Report	Try: Renaldo Bothma 4, David Philander 2, Penalty try 2, Rohan Kitshoff, Jaco Engels, Chrysander Botha, Heinrich Smit, Johann Tromp; Con: Theuns Kotzé 12	Referee: (Argentina) Francisco Pastrana

== Division 1B ==
Division 1B was held between 9 and 14 June 2014, in Tunis, Tunisia. The competing teams were:

- Ivory Coast
- Senegal
- Tunisia
- Uganda

Semi-finals
10 June 2014
Uganda	19
Ivory Coast	21
10 June 2014
Tunisia	22
Senegal	14

Final
14 June 2014
Ivory Coast	6
Tunisia	26
Third place
14 June 2014
Uganda	31
Senegal	32

Semi-finals

10 June 2014	Uganda	19 – 21	Ivory Coast	Stade Municipal, Nabeul, Tunisia

10 June 2014	Tunisia	22 – 14	Senegal	Stade Municipal, Nabeul, Tunisia

3rd Place Playoff

14 June 2014	Uganda	31 – 32	Senegal	Stade Municipal, Nabeul, Tunisia

Final

14 June 2014	Tunisia	26 – 6	Ivory Coast	Stade Municipal, Nabeul, Tunisia

== Division 1C ==
Division 1C was held between 14 and 21 June 2014, in Gaborone, Botswana.

Morocco were initially supposed to play in Division 1C, but withdrew; they were replaced by South African club side, the 2014 SARU Community Cup champions Rustenburg Impala.

The competing teams were:

- Botswana
- ~~Morocco~~
- Mauritius
- Nigeria
- Eswatini
- Zambia
- (South Africa) Rustenburg Impala

Place	Nation	Games				Points			Table points
Place	Nation	played	won	drawn	lost	for	against	difference	Table points
1	(South Africa) Rustenburg Impala	3	3	0	0	201	36	+165	15
2	Mauritius	3	2	0	1	218	78	+140	10
3	Botswana	3	2	0	1	161	68	+93	10
4	Nigeria	3	1	0	2	91	126	−35	5
5	Zambia	3	1	0	2	61	153	−92	5
6	Eswatini	3	0	0	3	10	281	−271	0

Match Schedule

15 June 2014	Mauritius	17 – 61	(South Africa) Rustenburg Impala	University of Botswana Stadium, Gaborone, Botswana

15 June 2014	Botswana	86 – 0	Eswatini	University of Botswana Stadium, Gaborone, Botswana

15 June 2014	Nigeria	20 – 30	Zambia	University of Botswana Stadium, Gaborone, Botswana

18 June 2014	Nigeria	61 – 10	Eswatini	University of Botswana Stadium, Gaborone, Botswana

18 June 2014	Zambia	17 – 67	Mauritius	University of Botswana Stadium, Gaborone, Botswana

18 June 2014	Botswana	9 – 54	(South Africa) Rustenburg Impala	University of Botswana Stadium, Gaborone, Botswana

21 June 2014	Botswana	66 – 14	Zambia	University of Botswana Stadium, Gaborone, Botswana

21 June 2014	Rustenburg Impala (South Africa)	86 – 10	Nigeria	University of Botswana Stadium, Gaborone, Botswana

21 June 2014	Mauritius	134 – 0	Eswatini	University of Botswana Stadium, Gaborone, Botswana

== Division 2 ==
Like in 2013, Division 2 is divided into North and South Groups. The North tournament was conducted under 7-a-side laws (similar to the 2012 tournament), while the South tournament was conducted under 15-a-side laws.

=== North ===
The North Group tournament was held in Ouagadougou, Burkina Faso on 17 and 18 May 2014. The competing teams were:

- Benin
- Burkina Faso
- Ghana
- Mali
- Niger
- Togo

Place	Nation	Games				Points			Table points
Place	Nation	played	won	drawn	lost	for	against	difference	Table points
1	Togo	5	4	0	1	67	57	+10	13
2	Burkina Faso	5	4	0	1	90	31	+59	13
3	Ghana	5	3	1	1	100	37	+63	12
4	Niger	5	2	0	3	57	55	+2	9
5	Mali	5	1	1	3	50	51	-1	8
6	Benin	3	0	0	5	12	145	-133	5

Match Schedule

==== Preliminary Games ====
17 May 2014	Mali	26 – 5	Benin	Ouagadougou, Burkina Faso

17 May 2014	Burkina Faso	5 – 12	Togo	Ouagadougou, Burkina Faso

17 May 2014	Niger	0 – 10	Ghana	Ouagadougou, Burkina Faso

17 May 2014	Togo	22 – 0	Benin	Ouagadougou, Burkina Faso

17 May 2014	Mali	12 – 12	Ghana	Ouagadougou, Burkina Faso

17 May 2014	Niger	7 – 12	Burkina Faso	Ouagadougou, Burkina Faso

17 May 2014	Ghana	33 – 0	Benin	Ouagadougou, Burkina Faso

17 May 2014	Niger	7 – 26	Togo	Ouagadougou, Burkina Faso

17 May 2014	Burkina Faso	15 – 7	Mali	Ouagadougou, Burkina Faso

17 May 2014	Togo	0 – 40	Ghana	Ouagadougou, Burkina Faso

17 May 2014	Burkina Faso	33 – 0	Benin	Ouagadougou, Burkina Faso

17 May 2014	Niger	12 – 0	Mali	Ouagadougou, Burkina Faso

18 May 2014	Burkina Faso	25 – 5	Ghana	Ouagadougou, Burkina Faso

18 May 2014	Mali	5 – 7	Togo	Ouagadougou, Burkina Faso

18 May 2014	Niger	31 – 7	Benin	Ouagadougou, Burkina Faso

==== 5th Place Playoff ====
18 May 2014	Mali	25 – 12	Benin	Ouagadougou, Burkina Faso

18 May 2014	Mali	5 – 5	Benin	Ouagadougou, Burkina Faso

==== Semi-finals ====
18 May 2014	Togo	10 – 5	Niger	Ouagadougou, Burkina Faso

18 May 2014	Burkina Faso	8 – 5	Ghana	Ouagadougou, Burkina Faso

==== 3rd Place Playoff ====
18 May 2014	Niger	10 – 5	Ghana	Ouagadougou, Burkina Faso

==== Final ====
18 May 2014	Burkina Faso	15 – 5	Togo	Ouagadougou, Burkina Faso

=== South ===
The South Group tournament was held in Kigali, Rwanda in between 3–7 June 2014. The competing teams were:

- Burundi
- DR Congo
- Rwanda

Place	Nation	Games				Points			Bonus points	Table points
Place	Nation	played	won	drawn	lost	for	against	difference	Bonus points	Table points
1	Rwanda	2	1	0	1	20	15	+5	1	5
2	DR Congo	2	1	0	1	9	5	+4	0	4
3	Burundi	2	1	0	1	6	15	-9	0	4

Only 11 Democratic Republic of the Congo players arrived for their match against Burundi. A match was played, with DRC winning 20-7. However, Burundi were awarded the match on forfeit, due to DRC only having 11 eligible players available.

3 June 2014	Burundi	6-15	Rwanda	Amahoro Stadium, Kigali City, Rwanda
	Pen: Christian Mugabonihera 2	Report	Try: Abdul Ngoge, Benjamin Makombe, Vincent Kamali

5 June 2014	Burundi	Burundi win on forfeit	DR Congo	Amahoro Stadium, Kigali City, Rwanda

7 June 2014	Rwanda	5 - 9	DR Congo	Amahoro Stadium, Kigali City, Rwanda

== See also ==
- Africa Cup
- 2015 Rugby World Cup – Africa qualification
- 2015 Rugby World Cup – Repechage qualification
