= 2004 CAR Development Trophy =

Tournament details
- Date: 1 May– 27 November 2004
- Teams: 13

Final positions
- Champions: Botswana
- Runner-up: Mali

Tournament statistics
- Matches played: 21

The 2004 CAR Development Trophy was the third edition of lower level rugby union tournament in Africa. After a preliminary, the teams were divided in three pools, with a final between the winner of each of them.

== Preliminary ==
Pos.	Team	Pld	W	D	L	PF	PA	diff.	Pts
1	Tanzania	2	2	0	0	109	15	+94	4
2	Rwanda	2	1	0	1	30	67	-37	2
3	Burundi	2	0	0	2	18	75	-57	0

1 May 2004

Tanzania	57 - 3	Burundi

Arushua

5 June 2004

Tanzania	52 - 12	Rwanda

Arushua

3 July 2004

Rwanda	18 - 15	Burundi

Kigali

== First round ==
=== Pool South ===
Pos.	Team	Pld	W	D	L	PF	PA	diff.	Pts
1	Botswana	2	2	0	0	73	34	+39	4
2	Eswatini	2	1	0	1	58	25	+33	2
3	Tanzania	2	0	0	2	12	74	-62	0

31 August 2004

Botswana	38 - 12	Tanzania

Gaborone

2 September 2004

Eswatini	36 - 0	Tanzania

Gaborone

4 September 2004

Botswana	25 - 22	Eswatini

Gaborone

=== Pool North "A" ===
Pos.	Team	Pld	W	D	L	PF	PA	diff.	Pts
1	Mali	3	3	0	0	136	21	+115	6
2	Senegal	3	2	0	1	91	21	+70	4
3	Burkina Faso	3	1	0	2	67	63	+4	2
4	Mauritania	3	0	0	3	0	189	-189	0

7 June 2004

Senegal	59 - 0	Mauritania

Dakar

7 June 2004

Mali	40 - 12	Burkina Faso

Dakar

9 June 2004

Senegal	23 - 6	Burkina Faso

Dakar

9 June 2004

Mali	81 - 0	Mauritania

Dakar

12 June 2004

Senegal	9 - 15	Mali

Dakar

12 June 2004

Burkina Faso	49 - 0	Mauritania

Dakar

=== Pool North "B" ===
Pos.	Team	Pld	W	D	L	PF	PA	diff.	Pts
1	Niger	3	2	1	0	71	3	+68	5
2	Togo	3	1	1	1	20	16	+4	3
3	Benin	3	1	1	1	17	51	-34	3
4	Ghana	3	0	1	2	8	46	-38	1

28 June 2004

Benin	11 - 5	Togo

Lomé

29 June 2004

Niger	28 - 0	Ghana

Lomé

1 July 2004

Niger	43 - 3	Benin

Lomé

1 July 2004

Togo	15 - 5	Ghana

Lomé

3 July 2004

Ghana	3 - 3	Benin

Lomé

3 July 2004

Niger	0 - 0	Togo

Lomé

== Final Pool ==
Pos.	Team	Pld	W	D	L	PF	PA	diff.	Pts
1	Botswana	2	2	0	0	49	6	+43	4
2	Mali	2	1	0	1	17	17	==	2
3	Niger	2	0	0	2	5	48	-43	0

23 November 2004

Mali	11 - 5	Niger

Bamako

25 November 2004

Botswana	37 - 0	Niger

Bamako

27 November 2004

Mali	6 - 12	Botswana

Bamako

== See also ==
- 2004 Africa Cup
