= 2016 Africa Cup =

16th Africa Cup
Final positions
- Champions: Namibia
- Runner-up: Kenya

The 2016 Africa Cup was the sixteenth edition of the Africa Cup, an annual international rugby union competition for African nations organised by Rugby Africa.

The competition was split into four divisions – Division 1A, Division 1B, Division 1C and Division 2, with promotion and relegation between the divisions.

== Divisions ==
Division 1A
Kenya
Namibia
Uganda
Zimbabwe
Division 1B
Pool A	Pool B
Madagascar	Botswana
Senegal	Ivory Coast
Zambia	Tunisia
Division 1C
Cameroon
Mauritius
Morocco
Nigeria

Division 2
Centre	West
Burundi	Benin
DR Congo	Burkina Faso
Rwanda	Ghana
	Mali
	Niger
	Togo

== Division 1A ==
2016 Africa Cup Division 1A
- Countries: Kenya; Namibia; Uganda; Zimbabwe
- Date: 2 July – 6 August 2016

The 2016 Africa Cup Division 1A was decided on a round-robin format. The matches was played between 2 July and 6 August 2016. The top two teams from 2015, Namibia and Zimbabwe played two home matches each, while Kenya (who finished third in 2015) and Uganda (who were promoted from Division 1B) hosted one match each. The log leader after the round-robin matches was crowned the Division 1A champions, while the team ranked last was relegated to Division 1B for 2017.

=== Teams ===
The following teams took part in the 2016 Africa Cup Division 1A:

2016 Africa Cup Division 1A teams
Kenya
Namibia
Uganda
Zimbabwe

Uganda were promoted from the 2015 Africa Cup Division 1B.

=== Standings ===
The final log for the 2016 Africa Cup Division 1A were:

2016 Africa Cup Division 1A log
Pos	Team	Pl	W	D	L	PF	PA	PD	BP	Pts
1	Namibia	3	3	0	0	156	74	+82	3	15
2	Kenya	3	2	0	1	127	95	+32	2	10
3	Uganda	3	1	0	2	89	112	−23	3	7
4	Zimbabwe	3	0	0	3	64	155	−91	1	1
* Legend: Pos = Position, Pl = Played, W = Won, D = Drawn, L = Lost, PF = Points for, PA = Points against, PD = Points difference, BP= Bonus points, Pts = Log points.

=== Matches ===
The following matches were played in the 2016 Africa Cup Division 1A:

2 July 2016	Uganda	31-40	Namibia	Kyadondo Rugby Club, Kampala
16:30	Try: Pius Ogena 7'; Philip Wokorach 32'c, 79'c Eric Kasita 55'c Oscar Kalyango 66'; Con: Chris Lubanga 32'; Philip Wokorach 55', 79'		Try: Chrysander Botha 23'c, 44'; Gino Wilson 27'c, 30'c JC Greyling 63'c Penalty Try 74'c Con: Theuns Kotzé 23', 27', 30', 63', 74'	Attendance: 7,000; Referee: (South Africa) Rasta Rasivhenge

9 July 2016	Zimbabwe	15-61	Kenya	Police Grounds, Harare
15:40	Try: Boyd Rouse; T. Parirenyaywa; Con: Lenience Tambwera (1/2); Pen: Lenience Tambwera		Try: Tony Onyango; David Ambunya (2); Dennis Muhanji (2); C. Licako; Tony Owuor; Edwin Achayo; Dan Sikuta; Max Adaka; Con: Darwin Mukidza (4/9); K. Masai (0/1); Pen: Darwin Mukidza; Cards: Tony Onyango (yellow card) 24' to 34'

16 July 2016	Namibia	56-21	Kenya	Hage Geingob Stadium, Windhoek
15:00	Try: Tjiuee Uanivi 3'; Chrysander Botha 6'; Rohan Kitshoff 15'; Gino Wilson 18'; Tinus du Plessis 23', 28'; Con: Theuns Kotzé (6/6) 4', 7', 16', 19', 24', 29'; Cards: Chrysander Botha (yellow card) 40' to 50'	report	Try: Isaac Adimo 32'; Con: Darwin Mukidza (1/1) 33'; Cards: Simon Muniafu (yellow card) 1' to 11'; Simon Muniafu (yellow card) 12' (red card)	Attendance: 800; Referee: (South Africa) Marius van der Westhuizen

23 July 2016	Zimbabwe	27-34	Uganda	Police Grounds, Harare

30 July 2016	Kenya	45-24	Uganda	RFUEA Grounds, Nairobi
				Attendance: 4,169

6 August 2016	Namibia	60-22	Zimbabwe

== Division 1B ==
2016 Africa Cup Division 1B
- Countries: Botswana; Ivory Coast; Madagascar; Senegal; Tunisia; Zambia
- Date: 12 June – 16 July 2016

The 2016 Africa Cup Division 1B consisted of two round-robin tournaments, with the winners of each tournament playing each other in the final. The six teams were divided into two pools, with three teams in each pool. The Pool B tournament between Madagascar, Senegal and Zambia was played in Antananarivo, Madagascar between 12 June and 19 June 2016, while the Pool A tournament between Botswana, Ivory Coast and Tunisia was played in Tunis, Tunisia between 26 June and 2 July 2016. The pool winners met in the final on 16 July 2016, with the winner of that match earning promotion to Division 1A. The team ranked last was relegated to Division 1C for 2017.

=== Teams ===
The following teams took part in the 2016 Africa Cup Division 1B:

2016 Africa Cup Division 1B Pool A teams
Botswana
Ivory Coast
Tunisia
2016 Africa Cup Division 1B Pool B teams
Madagascar
Senegal
Zambia

Tunisia were relegated from the 2015 Africa Cup Division 1A, while Zambia were promoted from the 2015 Africa Cup Division 1C.

=== Standings ===
The final log for the 2016 Africa Cup Division 1B were:

2016 Africa Cup Division 1B Pool A log
Pos	Team	Pl	W	D	L	PF	PA	PD	Pts
1	Tunisia	2	2	0	0	93	15	78	10
2	Ivory Coast	2	1	0	1	25	63	-38	4
3	Botswana	2	0	0	2	23	63	-40	1
2016 Africa Cup Division 1B Pool B log
Pos	Team	Pl	W	D	L	PF	PA	PD	Pts
1	Senegal	2	2	0	0	84	27	57	9
2	Madagascar	2	1	0	1	48	45	3	5
3	Zambia	2	0	0	2	18	78	-60	0
* Legend: Pos = Position, Pl = Played, W = Won, D = Drawn, L = Lost, PF = Points for, PA = Points against, PD = Points difference, Pts = Log points.

=== Matches ===
==== Pool A ====
26 June 2016	Tunisia	43–10	Botswana	Monastir, Tunisia
22:00				Attendance: 1,000; Referee: Sylvain Mane (Senegal)

29 June 2016	Ivory Coast	20–13	Botswana	Monastir, Tunisia
16:00				Attendance: 800; Referee: Cap Constant (Kenya)

2 July 2016	Tunisia	50-5	Ivory Coast	Monastir, Tunisia
22:00				Attendance: 3,000; Referee: Praderie Vivien(FRA)

==== Pool B ====
12 June 2016	Madagascar	24–15	Zambia	Mahamasina Municipal Stadium, Antananarivo, Madagascar
15:00				Referee: Jean Christiant Cauquil (Reunion)

15 June 2016	Zambia	3–54	Senegal	Mahamasina Municipal Stadium, Antananarivo, Madagascar
15:00				Referee: Gauthier Ozoux (Mauritius)

19 June 2016	Madagascar	24–30	Senegal	Mahamasina Municipal Stadium, Antananarivo, Madagascar
15:00				Referee: Lourens Van Der Merwe (South Africa)

==== Final ====
12 November 2016	Tunisia	14 - 15	Senegal	Monastir
15:00	Try: Chedy Jabri 69'; Con: Khalifa Chemseddine (0/1); Pen: Khalifa Chemseddine (3/6) 22', 32', 74'; Cards: Chargui Mohamed (yellow card) 56' to 66'; Khalifa Chemseddine (yellow card) 79' to 80'	report	Pen: Folliot Aldric (5/5) 6', 37', 47', 57', 79'; Cards: Mendy Felix (yellow card) 20' to 30'; Kane Demba (yellow card) 52' to 62'; Ndiayne Ousmane (yellow card) 79' to 80'	Attendance: 5,000; Referee: (Kenya) Constant Cap

== Division 1C ==
2016 Africa Cup Division 1C
- Countries: Mauritius; Morocco; Nigeria
- Date: 10 – 16 July 2016
- Champions: Morocco

The matches of Division 1C was played between 10 and 16 July 2016 at Stade du C.O.C. in Casablanca, Morocco. Teams from Mauritius, Morocco and Nigeria played in a round robin format. Cameroon was originally scheduled to compete, but withdrew due to internal problems with the union

This division also doubles as the first qualification phase for the 2019 Rugby World Cup. The winner of 2016 Africa Cup Division 1C will win promotion to the 2017 Africa Cup Division 1B, the second phase of the Rugby World Cup qualification process.

=== Teams ===
The following teams took part in the 2016 Africa Cup Division 1C:

2016 Africa Cup Division 1C log
Pos	Team	Pl	W	D	L	PF	PA	PD	BP	Pts
1	Morocco	2	2	0	0	121	13	+108	2	10
2	Nigeria	2	1	0	1	41	74	-33	1	5
3	Mauritius	2	0	0	2	24	99	-75	0	0
* Legend: Pos = Position, Pl = Played, W = Won, D = Drawn, L = Lost, PF = Points for, PA = Points against, PD = Points difference, BP = Bonus points Pts = Log points.

Morocco remained in Division 1C despite not playing in the 2015 Africa Cup, while Mauritius were relegated from the 2015 Africa Cup Division 1B.

=== Matches ===
10 July 2016	Morocco	68-3	Mauritius	Stade du C.O.C., Casablanca
17:00				Attendance: 1,700; Referee: Salem Attalh

13 July 2016	Nigeria	31-21	Mauritius	Stade du C.O.C., Casablanca
17:00		report		Attendance: 1,000; Referee: Akram Garchi

16 July 2016	Morocco	53-10	Nigeria	Stade du C.O.C., Casablanca
16:00				Attendance: 2,500; Referee: Bahroun Haykel

== Division 2 ==
2016 Africa Cup Division 2
- Countries: Benin; Burkina Faso; Burundi; Democratic Republic of the Congo; Ghana; Mali; Niger; Rwanda; Togo
- Date: 17 – 27 May 2016

The 2016 Africa Cup Division 2 was split into two regions. In the East region, Burundi, Lesotho, Democratic Republic of the Congo and Rwanda played in a tournament in Kigali, Rwanda between 17 and 20 May 2016. In the West region, Benin, Burkina Faso, Ghana, Mali, Niger and Togo played in a rugby sevens tournament in Lomé, Togo on 27 May 2016.

=== Teams ===
The following teams took part in the 2016 Africa Cup Division 2:

2016 Africa Cup Division 2 (East) teams
Burundi
DR Congo
Rwanda
Lesotho
2016 Africa Cup Division 2 (West) teams
Benin
Burkina Faso
Ghana
Mali
Niger
Togo

Congo, Lesotho, Malawi and Swaziland were not included in the 2016 Africa Cup.

=== Matches ===
==== East ====
Lesotho were originally scheduled to play in the semi-finals against DR Congo, but travel delays caused them to miss the first round, forfeiting the match.

Semi-finals
17 May 2016
Rwanda	15
Burundi	3
17 May 2016
Lesotho	F
DR Congo	0

Final
20 May 2016
Rwanda	9
DR Congo	12
Third place play-off
20 May 2016 2015
Burundi	3
Lesotho	6

===== Semi-finals =====
17 May 2016	Rwanda	15–3	Burundi	National Amahoro Stadium, Kigali
14:00	Try: Cambara Koko Marcel; Con: Isimbi Carlos

17 May 2016	Lesotho	forfeit	DR Congo	National Amahoro Stadium, Kigali
16:00

===== 3rd Place Finals =====
20 May 2016	Burundi	3–6	Lesotho	National Amahoro Stadium, Kigali
13:35	Pen: A. Karendo 26'		Pen: R. Molumo 15', 48'	Referee: Caition Bweupe (Zambia)

===== Final =====
20 May 2016	Rwanda	9–12	DR Congo	National Amahoro Stadium, Kigali
15:20	Pen: Paul J Hadjali 47', 73'; Drop: Kazungu 27'		Try: Bangabasi Ndangi 16'c Ntambwe Kanana 30'; Con: Bangabasi Ndangi 17'; Cards: David Mpunga (yellow card) 51' to 61'	Referee: Ramsey Olinga (Uganda)

==== West ====
===== Round-Robin =====
27 May 2016	Niger	15–10	Togo	Lomé, Togo

27 May 2016	Mali	12–3	Benin	Lomé, Togo

27 May 2016	Burkina Faso	5–12	Togo	Lomé, Togo

27 May 2016	Ghana	19–0	Benin	Lomé, Togo

27 May 2016	Niger	14–0	Burkina Faso	Lomé, Togo

27 May 2016	Mali	0–15	Ghana	Lomé, Togo

===== Semi-finals =====
27 May 2016	Niger	0–26	Mali	Lomé, Togo

27 May 2016	Ghana	19–22	Togo	Lomé, Togo

===== 5th Place Playoff =====
27 May 2016	Burkina Faso	5–22	Benin	Lomé, Togo

===== 3rd Place Playoff =====
27 May 2016	Niger	5–14	Ghana	Lomé, Togo

===== Final =====
27 May 2016	Togo	12–17	Mali	Lomé, Togo

== See also ==
- Africa Cup
