= 2017 Rugby Africa season =

17th Africa Cup
Final positions
- Champions: Namibia
- Runner-up: Kenya

The 2017 Rugby Africa season contains a series of rugby union tournaments scheduled for 2017 and organised by the governing body of rugby union in Africa, Rugby Africa. The top-tier event is the Rugby Africa Gold Cup – formerly simply known as the Africa Cup – a six-team competition which was played on a round-robin basis from June to August 2017.

Location of teams in the 2017 Rugby Africa Gold, Silver and Bronze Cups
Gold Cup
Silver Cup
Bronze Cup North
Bronze Cup South

== Competitions ==
As in previous Africa Cup seasons, all participating teams were divided into multiple tiers. For 2017, a restructuring and subsequent rebranding occurred as follows:

- Gold Cup: the tier 1 event. The four teams from 2016's Division 1A – Kenya, Namibia, Uganda and Zimbabwe – were joined by the two pool winners from Division 1B, Senegal and Tunisia. This competition was played on a round-robin basis from 24 June to 5 August 2017.
- Silver Cup: the tier 2 event. The three highest-ranked non-finalists from Division 1B – Botswana, Ivory Coast and Madagascar – were joined by Division 1C champions Morocco for a tournament that was held between 5 and 8 July 2017.
- Bronze Cup: the tier 3 event. The Bronze Cup consisted of six teams, divided into a Group North and a Group South. The northern group took place from 17 to 26 March and contained Nigeria from 2016's Division 1C and Algeria and Cameroon, both returning after not competing in the competition in 2016. The southern group took place from 24 March to 2 April and was made up of Zambia, relegated from Division 1B, Mauritius from Division 1C and Rwanda, who recently attained full membership of World Rugby.
- Regional Challenge: the lowest tier of African rugby. The remaining twelve teams were divided into four groups of three teams; the Group West 1 tournament containing Benin, Ghana and Togo was played from 30 April to 6 May, the Group West 2 tournament containing Burkina Faso, Mali and Niger was played from 21 to 27 May, the Group Centre tournament containing Burundi, Democratic Republic of Congo and Gabon was played from 1 to 7 October, and the Group South tournament containing Lesotho, Malawi and Swaziland was played from 15 to 22 October.

In addition to the main fifteens tournaments, an Under-20 competition featuring eight teams was held in April and a rugby sevens tournament involving twelve teams was held in November. A women's rugby sevens tournament is also to be scheduled.

== Teams ==
The following teams will take part in the 2017 Rugby Africa season.

Rankings are taken from the start of each division

Gold Cup			Silver Cup			Bronze Cup					
Gold Cup			Silver Cup			North			South		
Team	2016 position	WR Rank	Team	2016 position	WR Rank	Team	2016 position	WR Rank	Team	2016 position	WR Rank
Kenya	2nd D1A	25	Botswana	5th D1B	64	Algeria	N/A	N/A	Mauritius	3rd D1C	89
Namibia	1st D1A	21	Ivory Coast	4th D1B	53	~~Cameroon~~	N/A	90	Rwanda	2nd D2 East	96
Senegal	1st D1B	39	Madagascar	3rd D1B	45	Nigeria	2nd D1C	74	Zambia	6th D1B	83
Tunisia	2nd D1B	49	Morocco	1st D1C	50						
Uganda	3rd D1A	45									
Zimbabwe	4th D1A	36									

Regional Challenge
West 1			West 2			Centre			South		
Team	2016 position	WR Rank	Team	2016 position	WR Rank	Team	2016 position	WR Rank	Team	2016 position	WR Rank
Benin	5th D2 West	N/A	Burkina Faso	6th D2 West	N/A	Burundi	4th D2 East	N/A	Lesotho	3rd D2 East	N/A
Ghana	3rd D2 West	N/A	Mali	1st D2 West	N/A	DR Congo	1st D2 East	N/A	Malawi	N/A	N/A
Togo	2nd D2 West	N/A	Niger	4th D2 West	N/A	~~Gabon~~	N/A	N/A	Eswatini	N/A	91

== Gold Cup ==
2017 Rugby Africa Gold Cup
- Countries: Kenya; Namibia; Senegal; Tunisia; Uganda; Zimbabwe
- Date: 24 June – 5 August 2017

The 2017 Gold Cup doubles as qualification for the 2019 Rugby World Cup. The last place team will be relegated to the 2018 Silver Cup and eliminated from World Cup qualification.

=== Standings ===
The final standings in the 2017 Rugby Africa Gold Cup were:

2017 Rugby Africa Gold Cup
Pos	Team	Pl	W	D	L	PF	PA	PD	BP	Pts
1	Namibia	5	5	0	0	272	64	+208	5	25
2	Kenya	5	3	1	1	226	135	+91	4	18
3	Uganda	5	3	1	1	190	126	+64	2	16
4	Tunisia	5	2	0	3	91	272	−181	0	8
5	Zimbabwe	5	1	0	4	111	157	−46	2	6
6	Senegal	5	0	0	5	75	211	−136	1	1
* Legend: Pos = Position, Pl = Played, W = Won, D = Drawn, L = Lost, PF = Points for, PA = Points against, PD = Points difference, Pts = Log points.

=== Matches ===
The following matches were played in the 2017 Rugby Africa Gold Cup:

==== Round one ====
24 June 2017	Kenya	33–33	Uganda	RFUEA Ground, Nairobi
16:30	Try: Jacob Ojee 23', 55'; Moses Amusala 32'; Penalty Try 77'; Con: Jacob Ojee 56'; Pen: Darwin Mukidza 20', 41', 61'	WR report CAR Report	Try: Charles Uhuru Odongo 9'; Brian Asaba 45'; Michael Okorach 72'; Con: Philip Wokorach 10', 46', 73'; Pen: Philip Wokorach 6', 39', 64', 70'; Cards: Pius Ogena (yellow card) 29' to 39'	Referee: (France) Laurent Cardona

24 June 2017	Senegal	16–28	Zimbabwe	Stade Iba Mar Doip, Dakar
15:30	Try: Sadio Traore 9'; Con: Aldric Folliot 10'; Pen: Aldric Folliot 20', 36', 69'	WR report CAR Report	Try: Takudzwa Kumadiro 56', 63', 73'; Stephan Hunduza 80'; Con: Lenience Tambwera 81'; Pen: Hirton Mudariki 18'; Tichafara Makwanya 40'; Cards: Fortune Chipendu (yellow card) 35' to 45'; Lenience Tambwera (yellow card) 49' to 59'	Attendance: 1,500; Referee: (France) Thomas Charabas

Bye/s: Namibia, Tunisia

==== Round two ====
1 July 2017	Tunisia	7–53	Namibia	Stade Mustapha Ben Jannet, Monastir
	Try: Sofiene Ben Aicha 36'; Con: Abbes Kherfani 37'; Cards: Achref Ben Hamouda (yellow card) 53' to 63'	WR Report; CAR Report	Try: Rohan Kitshoff 10', 24', 31'; Lesley Klim 49'; Wian Conradie 67', 77'; TC Kisting 79'; David Philander 80'; Con: Eugene Jantjies 32', 50', 67', 77'; TC Kisting 79'; Pen: Eugene Jantjies 62'	Attendance: 1500; Referee: (France) Cédric Marchat

1 July 2017	Senegal	16–17	Uganda	Stade Iba Mar Doip, Dakar
	Try: Moussa Barry 23'; Con: Aldric Folliot 24'; Pen: Aldric Folliot 3', 18', 51'; Cards: Felix Mendy (red card) 48'	WR report CAR Report	Try: Charles Uhuru Odongo 15'; Alex Mubiru 31'; Con: Philip Wokorach 16', 32'; Pen: Philip Wokorach 8'	Attendance: 3500; Referee: (France) Sébastien Minery

Bye/s: Kenya, Zimbabwe

==== Round three ====
8 July 2017	Kenya	100–10	Tunisia	RFUEA Ground, Nairobi
16:00	Try: Jacob Ojee 10', 34', 80'; Darwin Mukidza 19', 22', 74'; Eric Kerre 25', 69'; Sam Onsomu 32'; Joshua Chisanga 39'; Wilson Kopondo 41'; Tony Onyango 45'; Leo Seje 49'; Martin Owilla 59'; Steve Otieno 65'; Con: Darwin Mukidza (9/13) 11', 20', 23', 32', 45', 49', 59', 65', 69'; Kenny Andola (2/2) 74', 80'; Pen: Darwin Mukidza 14'	report	Try: Achref Ben Hamouda 29'; Ashraf Dhif 37'; Con: Abess Kherfami (0/2); Pen: Houcem Khalfi (0/1); Cards: Nisar Nasri (yellow card) 72' to 80'	Attendance: 4,100; Referee: (France) Tual Trainini

8 July 2017	Namibia	95–0	Senegal	Hage Geingob Rugby Stadium, Windhoek
	Try: Rohan Kitshoff 6', 22', 42', 54'; Adriaan Booysen 11'; Louis van der Westhuizen 16'; Lesley Klim 26', 57'; AJ de Klerk 34'; Darryl de la Harpe 50', 72'; JC Greyling 62'; Thomasau Forbes 65'; Johann Tromp 69'; Theuns Kotzé 78'; Con: Eugene Jantjies (7/12) 7', 17', 27', 51', 55', 58', 66'; Theuns Kotzé (3/3) 70', 73', 79'; Cards: Louis van der Westhuizen (red card) 16'; Mahepisa Tjeriko (yellow card) 49' to 59'	report	Pen: Steve Sargos (0/1)	Attendance: 1,000; Referee: (South Africa) Egon Seconds

Bye/s: Uganda, Zimbabwe

==== Round four ====
15 July 2017	Kenya	45–25	Senegal	RFUEA Ground, Nairobi
14:00	Try: Darwin Mukidza 7', 10', 79'; Joshua Chisanga 26'; Davis Chenge 40+2'; David Ambunya 48'; Philip Ikambili 61'; Con: Darwin Mukidza (4/6) 11', 40+3', 48', 62'; Kenny Andola (1/1) 79'	report	Try: Steve Sargos 18'; Georges Pompidou Mendy 64', 80+1'; Con: Jonathan Courtinard (1/1) 19'; Steve Sargos (1/2) 65'; Pen: Steve Sargos (2/2) 3' 52'	Attendance: 2,000; Referee: (France) Thomas Charabas

15 July 2017	Uganda	78–17	Tunisia	Kyadondo Rugby Club, Kampala
	Try: Philip Wokorach 9', 28', 67'; Charles Uhuru Odongo 10'; Alex Mubiru 15'; Brian Odongo 23'; Ivan Magomu 35'; James Odongo 40'; Michael Okorach 50'; Pius Ogena 52'; Mathias Ochwo 57'; Solomon Okia 62'; Con: Philip Wokorach 9', 11', 24', 29', 51', 53', 58', 63'; Ivan Makmot 69'	WR report report	Try: Nacer Mili 64'; Dhia Dhieb 76'; Ashraf Dhif 80'; Con: Abbes Kerfani 65'	Referee: (South Africa) Lesego Legoete

15 July 2017	Namibia	31–26	Zimbabwe	Hage Geingob Rugby Stadium, Windhoek
	Try: Damian Stevens 15'; Darryl de la Harpe 49'; Gino Wilson 54'; JC Greyling 69'; Johann Tromp 74'; Con: Eugene Jantjies (1/3) 15'; Cliven Loubser (2/2) 71', 75'	report	Try: Hilton Mudariki 20'; Takudzwa Kelvin Kumadiro 40+1'; Con: Tichafara Makwanya (2/2) 21', 40+1'; Pen: Tichafara Makwanya (4/5) 10', 35', 42', 58'	Attendance: 2,000; Referee: (South Africa) Quinton Immelman

==== Round five ====
22 July 2017	Uganda	24–48	Namibia	Kyadondo Rugby Club, Kampala
14:00	Try: Asuman Mugerwa 4'; Eric Mula 54'; Philip Wokorach 66'; Con: Philip Wokorach 5', 55', 67'; Pen: Philip Wokorach 15'		Try: Justin Newman 11', 45'; Damian Stevens 22'; Johann Tromp 33'; David Philander 51', 80+2'; Des Sethie 78'; Con: Cliven Loubser 12', 23', 46', 79', 80+3'; Pen: Cliven Loubser 7'	Referee: (South Africa) Jaco van Heerden

22 July 2017	Zimbabwe	22–41	Kenya	Hartsfield Rugby Ground, Bulawayo
15:30				Attendance: 2,500; Referee: (South Africa) Lesego Legoete

Bye/s: Senegal, Tunisia

==== Round six ====
29 July 2017	Namibia	45–7	Kenya	Hage Geingob Rugby Stadium, Windhoek
	Try: David Philander 8', 58'; Chrysander Botha 40'; Cliven Loubser 45'; JC Greyling 49'; Casper Viviers 72'; Lesley Klim 75'; Con: Cliven Loubser (4/5) 9', 21', 50', 72'; Theuns Kotzé 75'; Cards: Mahepisa Tjeriko (yellow card) 40' to 50'	report	Try: Moses Amusala 53'; Con: Isaac Adimo (1/1) 54'	Attendance: 4,500; Referee: (South Africa) Rasta Rasivhenge

29 July 2017	Zimbabwe	23–31	Tunisia	Police Grounds, Harare
	Try: Hilton Mudariki 34'; Hilton Lang 57'; Irvine Nduwa 72'; Con: Tichafara Makwanya (1/3) 35'; Pen: Tichafara Makwanya (2/2) 3', 44'; Cards: Kingsley Lang (yellow card) 18' to 28'	report	Try: Issam Werhani 37'; Chadi Jabri 60', 63'; Con: Chamseddine Khalifa (2/3) 39', 64'; Pen: Chamseddine Khalifa (4/6) 5', 15', 31', 50'; Cards: Khaled Zegdene (yellow card) 42' to 52'	Referee: (South Africa) Jaco van Heerden

Bye/s: Senegal, Uganda

==== Round seven ====
5 August 2017	Tunisia	26–18	Senegal	Stade Mustapha Ben Jannet, Monastir
	Try: Abdelmajid Zemzem 39'; Chadi Jabri 47'; Con: Chamseddine Khalifa (2/2) 40', 48'; Pen: Chamseddine Khalifa (4/6) 6', 13', 27', 35'; Cards: Abdelmajid Zemzem (yellow card) 69' to 79'	WR report	Try: Georges Pompidou Mendy 50', 70'; Con: Mathieu Boscaro (1/2) 71'; Pen: Mathieu Boscaro (2/4) 38', 76'; Cards: Moktar Sougoufara (yellow card) 17' to 27'; Antoine Laporte (yellow card) 19' to 29'	Attendance: 2,500; Referee: (South Africa) Jaco van Heerden

5 August 2017	Uganda	38–12	Zimbabwe	Kyadondo Rugby Club, Kampala
	Try: Brian Asaba 3'; Lawrence Ssebuliba 16', 42', 71'; Aaron Ofoyrwoth 20'; Philip Wokorach 24'; Con: Philip Wokorach (4/5) 17', 21', 25', 71'	WR report	Try: Royal Mwale 1'; Penalty try 35'; Con: Hilton Mudariki (1/1) 36'; Pen: Taddy Hwata Dzandiwandira (0/1)	Attendance: 5,000; Referee: (France) Adrien Descottes

Bye/s: Kenya, Namibia

== Silver Cup ==
2017 Rugby Africa Silver Cup
- Countries: Botswana; Ivory Coast; Madagascar; Morocco
- Date: 5 – 8 July 2017

The 2017 Silver Cup doubles as qualification for the 2019 Rugby World Cup. Winner gets promoted to the 2018 Gold Cup, while all other teams will be eliminated from World Cup qualification.

=== Bracket ===
Semi-finals
5 July 2017
Botswana	25
Ivory Coast	58
5 July 2017
Morocco	57
Madagascar	33

Final
8 July 2017
Ivory Coast	3
Morocco	8
Third place play-off
8 July 2017
Botswana	19
Madagascar	47

=== Matches ===
5 July 2017	Botswana	25–58	Ivory Coast	Stade du C.O.C., Casablanca
17:30	Try: Moepi Tabang 59'; Penalty Try 70'; Jeremy Babbage 79'; Con: Katse Tshoganetso (1/2) 60'; Pen: Patrick Dent (1/1) 17'; Katse Tshoganetso (1/1) 28'; Cards: Patrick Dent (yellow card) 31' to 41'	report	Try: Jonathan Kevin Lo 11'; Yann Lohore 14', 23'; Dit Peres Paul Diallo 34', 42'; Dion Evrard Oulai 38'; Jourdan Ezer Kosse 46'; Dov Ore Kosse 56'; Con: Jonathan Kevin Lo (6/8) 12', 15', 35', 39', 43', 57'; Drop: Jonathan Kevin Lo 8', 32'; Cards: Yann Lohore (yellow card) 58' to 68'	Attendance: 800; Referee: Cayre Ludovic

5 July 2017	Morocco	57–33	Madagascar	Stade du C.O.C., Casablanca
18:00	Try: Ismail Nassik 4'; Mehdi Benyachou 14'; Mohammed Lahlali 30'; Youness Hou 32'; Salim Boukhanoucha 55', 79'; Reda Benazzi 59'; Jeremy Braille 78'; Con: Yann Reseaux (5/6) 5', 31', 33', 78', 80'; Brayan Brichet (2/2) 55', 62'; Pen: Yann Reseaux (1/1) 23'; Cards: Yann Reseaux (yellow card) 41' to 51'; Mohammed Lahlali (yellow card) 49' to 59'	report	Try: Hery Fanomegantsoa Rataimiona 10'; Tinella Tsivery Rabemanjara 12', 44'; Tarjoner Randriamanantena 21'; Ihini Henry 25'; Con: Sdoniaina Herizo Oanaiyoras (4/5) 13', 22', 26', 45'; Pen: Sdoniaina Herizo Oanaiyoras (0/2); Jose Rakoto Harison (0/1); Cards: Mboiaharison Francois (yellow card) 51' to 61'; Tongosoa Rakotobe (yellow card) 54' to 64'	Attendance: 1,000; Referee: Cedric Clave

8 July 2017	Botswana	19-47	Madagascar	Stade du C.O.C., Casablanca
17:30	Try: Maifala Thato 23', 39'; Ncube Tafa 80'; Con: Moepi Tabang 24'; Maifala Thato 40'	CAR report WR report	Try: Ratsmba Ramaromiantso 6'; Hery Nanteraina 15'; Tanjona Randriamanantena 28'; Mboiaharison Francois 35'; Jose Rakoto Harison 50', 58'; Mohamed Said 52'; Con: Jose Rakoto Harison (6/7) 16', 29', 36', 51', 53', 59'; Cards: Tsilavoniaina Ramahyngala (red card) 72'	Attendance: 600; Referee: Cedric Clave

8 July 2017	Morocco	8-3	Ivory Coast	Stade du C.O.C., Casablanca
17:30	Try: Salim Boukanoucha 76'; Con: Brayan Brichet (0/1); Pen: Yann Resseaux (1/4) 11'; Cards: Mohammed Lahlali (yellow card) 40' to 50'; Benjamin Braille (yellow card) 48' to 58'	report	Pen: Jonathan Kerin Lo (1/2) 79'; Cards: Behi Kessie Jean Gbapo (red card) 11'; Youness Hou (yellow card) 48' to 58'; Quentin Poupeau (yellow card) 74' to 80'	Attendance: 1,000; Referee: Ludovic Cayre

== Bronze Cup ==
2017 Rugby Africa Bronze Cup
- Countries: Group North: Algeria; Cameroon (suspended); Nigeria (withdrew); Group South: Mauritius; Rwanda; Zambia
- Date: 23 April – 13 May 2017

=== Group North ===
==== Standings ====
Cameroon were suspended and Nigeria withdrew. Algeria finished first.
The final standings in the 2017 Rugby Africa Bronze Cup Group North were:

2017 Rugby Africa Bronze Cup Group North
Pos	Team	Pl	W	D	L	PF	PA	PD	BP	Pts
1	Algeria	Qualified automatically								
–	Nigeria	Withdrew								
–	Cameroon	Supended								
* Legend: Pos = Position, Pl = Played, W = Won, D = Drawn, L = Lost, PF = Points for, PA = Points against, PD = Points difference, Pts = Log points.

==== Matches ====
The Bronze Cup North fixtures were originally to be played in Yaoundé in May 2017, with Cameroon also present, but had been postponed through lack of organization that Rugby Africa disqualified Cameroon and suspended the activity of the country's federation for three months. The matches will now be a home-and-home series between Algeria and Nigeria, with dates to be determined.

Nigeria also withdrew, so Algeria face Zambia in a one off fixture on 4 November.

=== Group South ===
==== Standings ====
The final standings in the 2017 Rugby Africa Bronze Cup Group South were:

2017 Rugby Africa Bronze Cup Group South
Pos	Team	Pl	W	D	L	PF	PA	PD	BP	Pts
1	Zambia	2	2	0	0	161	6	+155	2	10
2	Rwanda	2	1	0	1	27	104	−77	1	5
3	Mauritius	2	0	0	2	15	93	−78	0	0
* Legend: Pos = Position, Pl = Played, W = Won, D = Drawn, L = Lost, PF = Points for, PA = Points against, PD = Points difference, Pts = Log points.

==== Matches ====
23 April	Zambia	69–3	Mauritius	Lusaka Rugby Club Show Grounds, Lusaka, Zambia
15:00	Try: Thaddious Chipoya 6'; Jubilee Chisenga 18'; David Chimbukuzu 21'; Lastone Mukdsa 28'; Israel Kasumba 35'; Edward Mumba 39', 65', 80'; Oscar Bwalya 54'; Jeremy Badcock 74'; Carlos Kanyama 77'; Con: Lastone Mukdsa 6', 36', 40', 55', 66', 78', 80'; Cards: Phillip Kamanga (yellow card) 37' to 47'	report	Pen: Pierre Noel 10'

26 April	Mauritius	10–24	Rwanda	Lusaka Rugby Club Show Grounds, Lusaka, Zambia
15:00	Try: Arvin Pooloogadoo 8'; Ludcuic Leclair 62'		Try: Michael Mugisino 30'; Marvin Rukundakuvuca 34'; Christian Uwase 68'; Ombeni Iradukunda 76'; Con: Lucien Bikamba 15', 69'

29 April	Zambia	92–3	Rwanda	Lusaka Rugby Club Show Grounds, Lusaka, Zambia
15:00	Try: Emanuel Daka 6'; Kabwe Musonoa 12', 28'; Phillip Kamanga 18', 38', 66'; Sheleni Michelo 24', 78'; Simon Nyangu 33', 53'; Oscar Bwalya 40', 48'; Brian Chansa 69', 74', 80'; Con: Laston Mukosa 7', 19', 29', 39', 40+2', 54', 70'; Pen: Laston Mukosa 3'		Pen: Omberi L'Ramuanam 41'

=== Final Winner North vs Winner South ===
4 November	Zambia	25–30	Algeria	Mufulira Rugby Fields, Mufulira, Zambia
16:00	Try: David Chimbukuzu 63'; Banda 68'; Saimbunji 80'; Con: Laston Mukosa (2/3) 64', 80'; Pen: Laston Mukosa (2/3) 13', 40'	report	Try: Kardon 11'; Khaled Kahlouchi 37'; Bjebarri 50'; Gueraoui 73'; Con: Johan Bensalla (2/4) 12', 50'; Pen: Johan Bensalla (2/3) 8', 43'	Attendance: 3,000

== Regional Challenge ==
2017 Rugby Africa Regional Challenge
- Countries: Group West 1: Benin; Ghana; Togo; Group West 2: Burkina Faso; Mali; Niger; Group Centre: Burundi; Democratic Republic of Congo; Gabon; Group South: Lesotho; Malawi; Swaziland
- Date: 30 April – 22 October 2017

Location of teams in the 2017 Rugby Africa Regional Challenge
Group West 1
Group West 2
Group Centre
Group South

=== Group West 1 ===
==== Standings ====
The final standings in the 2017 Rugby Africa Regional Challenge Group West 1 were:

2017 Rugby Africa Regional Challenge Group West 1
Pos	Team	Pl	W	D	L	PF	PA	PD	Pts
1	Ghana	2	2	0	0	56	5	+51	9
2	Benin	2	1	0	1	19	58	−39	4
3	Togo	2	0	0	2	12	24	−12	1
* Legend: Pos = Position, Pl = Played, W = Won, D = Drawn, L = Lost, PF = Points for, PA = Points against, PD = Points difference, Pts = Log points.

==== Matches ====
All matches will be held at Accra Sports Stadium, Accra, Ghana.

30 April	Ghana	46–5	Benin	Accra Sports Stadium, Accra, Ghana
	Try: Jalilu Yussif Abdul 5', 18'; Abdul Mumuni Halidu 15'; Theophilus Opai 23', 72', 76'; Michael Acquaye 32'; Kelechi Onwunta 58'; Con: Theophilus Opai 22', 33'; Francis Donkor 73'	report	Try: Alphonse Guegni 8'	Attendance: 250; Referee: Ignace Ndri

3 May	Togo	12–14	Benin	Accra Sports Stadium, Accra, Ghana
	Try: Yawovi Leon Nyametso 25'; Aziz Mehinto 64'; Con: Kodjovi Mawuena Kpovi 26'	report	Try: Abraham Azonde 15'; Louis Hodonou 74'; Con: Pascal Kinnouvo 15', 75'	Attendance: 100; Referee: Ignace Ndri

6 May	Ghana	10–0	Togo	Accra Sports Stadium, Accra, Ghana
	Try: Rahman Salisu Abdul 23'; Theophilus Opai 63'	report		Attendance: 200; Referee: Ignace Ndri

=== Group West 2 ===
==== Standings ====
The final standings in the 2017 Rugby Africa Regional Challenge Group West 2 were:

2017 Rugby Africa Regional Challenge Group West 2
Pos	Team	Pl	W	D	L	PF	PA	PD	Pts
1	Burkina Faso	2	1	1	0	24	18	+6	6
3	Mali	2	1	0	1	26	19	+7	5
2	Niger	2	0	1	1	15	28	−13	2
* Legend: Pos = Position, Pl = Played, W = Won, D = Drawn, L = Lost, PF = Points for, PA = Points against, PD = Points difference, Pts = Log points.

==== Matches ====
18 May	Niger	10–10	Burkina Faso	Stade Général-Seyni-Kountché, Niamey
17:00	Try: Issa Laonkonde 37'; Bignozi Bah Traore 52'	report	Try: Stephane Bationo 1'; Abdoul Rachid Sawadogo 72'	Attendance: 500; Referee: Ignace N’dri

21 May	Mali	8–14	Burkina Faso	Stade Général-Seyni-Kountché, Niamey
17:00	Try: Boubacar Traore 24'; Pen: Mahamane Maiga 61'; Cards: Karim Traore (yellow card) 67' to 77'		Try: Antoine Yameogo 70'; Pen: Nouroudi Guinko 5'; Antoine Yameogo 27', 65'	Attendance: 300; Referee: Ignace N’dri

24 May	Niger	5–18	Mali	Stade Général-Seyni-Kountché, Niamey
17:00	Try: Manirou Ali 52'	report	Try: Penalty Try 15'; Karim Traore 22'; Con: Mohamed Sangare 16', 22'; Pen: Mohamed Sangare 46', 70'; Cards: Ibrahima Traore (yellow card) 78' to 80'	Attendance: 600; Referee: Ignace N’dri

=== Group Centre ===
Gabon was originally intended to participate, but withdrew. The match between Burundi and DR Congo was to be played on 7 October in Bujumbura, Burundi, but with DR Congo not showing up for the match, the match was declared forfeit and DR Congo faced the possibility of suspension.

7 October	Burundi	w/o	DR Congo

=== Group South ===
==== Standings ====
The final standings in the 2017 Rugby Africa Regional Challenge Group South were:

2017 Rugby Africa Regional Challenge Group South
Pos	Team	Pl	W	D	L	PF	PA	PD	Pts
1	Lesotho	2	2	0	0	127	8	119	10
2	Eswatini	2	1	0	1	30	71	−41	5
3	Malawi	2	0	0	2	14	92	−78	0
* Legend: Pos = Position, Pl = Played, W = Won, D = Drawn, L = Lost, PF = Points for, PA = Points against, PD = Points difference, Pts = Log points.

==== Matches ====
The fixtures for the 2017 Rugby Africa Regional Challenge Group South will be played from 15–21 October in Mafeteng, Lesotho.

15 October	Lesotho	60−5	Eswatini	Machabeng College, Mafeteng, Lesotho

18 October	Malawi	11−25	Eswatini	Machabeng College, Mafeteng, Lesotho
2:30 pm

21 October	Lesotho	67−3	Malawi	Machabeng College, Mafeteng, Lesotho
2:30 pm

== See also ==
- Africa Cup
- 2019 Rugby World Cup – Africa qualification
