= 2007 CAR Development Trophy =

The 2007 CAR Development Trophy, at the time called the CAR Castel Cup for the sponsor, was the fourth edition of a rugby union tournament in Africa. It consisted of teams in the second division.

The competition places sixteen teams into two zones, North and South. Each zone is then divided into two pools of four. Each pool winner then qualifies for the final, so there is a winner for both north and south.

In 2007, Botswana defeated Tanzania with a score of 37-14 to win the South final. In the North Nigeria won. Burkina Faso did not compete in the final.

== South Section ==
2007 CAR Development Trophy South Section
Tournament details
- Date: 19 June– 18 August 2007
- Teams: 7

Final positions
- Champions: Botswana
- Runner-up: Tanzania

Tournament statistics
- Matches played: 10

=== Pool A ===
- Burundi withdrew for financial reasons

Place	Nation	Games				Points		Bonus	Table points
Place	Nation	played	won	drawn	lost	for	against	Bonus	Table points
1	Tanzania	2	2	0	0	71	17	1	9
2	Mayotte	2	1	0	1	69	18	2	6
3	Rwanda	2	0	0	2	111	6	0	0

26 June 2007

Tanzania	18 - 11	Mayotte

Arusha

28 June 2007

Mayotte	58 - 0	Rwanda

Arusha

30 June 2007

Tanzania	53 - 6	Rwanda

Arusha

=== Pool B ===
Place	Nation	Games				Points		Bonus	Table points
Place	Nation	played	won	drawn	lost	for	against	Bonus	Table points
1	Botswana	3	2	0	1	83	26	2	10
2	Réunion	3	2	0	1	79	30	2	10
3	Mauritius	3	2	0	1	69	55	1	9
4	Eswatini	3	0	0	3	19	139	0	0

- Botswana Qualified due to better point score (+57) against (+39)

17 July 2007

Mauritius	41 - 12	Eswatini

Gaborone

17 July 2007

Botswana	6 - 15	Réunion

Gaborone

19 July 2007

Botswana	46 - 0	Eswatini

Gaborone

19 July 2007

Mauritius	17 - 12	Réunion

Gaborone

21 July 2007

Réunion	52 - 7	Eswatini

Gaborone

21 July 2007

Botswana	31 - 11	Mauritius

Gaborone

=== Final ===
18 August 2007

Botswana	37 - 14	Tanzania

Gaborone

== North Section ==
2007 CAR Development Trophy North Section
Tournament details
- Date: 19 June– 17 July 2007
- Teams: 8

Final positions
- Champions: Nigeria
- Runner-up: Burkina Faso

Tournament statistics
- Matches played: 12

=== Pool A ===
Place	Nation	Games				Points		Bonus	Table points
Place	Nation	played	won	drawn	lost	for	against	Bonus	Table points
1	Burkina Faso	3	3	0	0	54	3	1	13
2	Mali	3	2	0	1	42	16	1	9
3	Niger	3	1	0	2	63	18	3	7
4	Chad	3	0	0	3	0	122	0	0

19 June 2007

Mali	32 - 0	Chad

Ouagadougou

19 June 2007

Burkina Faso	8 - 3	Niger

Ouagadougou

20 June 2007

Mali	10 - 6	Niger

Ouagadougou

20 June 2007

Burkina Faso	36 - 0	Chad

Ouagadougou

22 June 2007

Burkina Faso	10 - 0	Mali

Ouagadougou

22 June 2007

Niger	54 - 0	Chad

Ouagadougou

=== Pool B ===
Place	Nation	Games				Points		Bonus	Table points
Place	Nation	played	won	drawn	lost	for	against	Bonus	Table points
1	Nigeria	3	3	0	0	83	26	1	13
2	Togo	3	2	0	1	46	38	0	8
3	Ghana	3	1	0	2	39	55	0	4
4	Benin	3	0	0	3	21	70	1	1

11 July 2007

Togo	21 - 10	Ghana

Lagos

11 July 2007

Nigeria	36 - 6	Benin

Lagos

14 July 2007

Togo	14 - 8	Benin

Lagos

14 July 2007

Nigeria	27 - 9	Ghana

Lagos

17 July 2007

Ghana	20 - 7	Benin

Lagos

17 July 2007

Nigeria	20 - 11	Togo

Lagos

=== Final ===
Nigeria won because Burkina Faso withdrew.
