= 2012 Africa Cup =

12th Africa Cup
Final positions
- Champions: Zimbabwe
- Runner-up: Uganda

The 2012 Africa Cup was the twelfth edition of the Africa Cup, an annual international rugby union tournament for African nations organised by the Confederation of African Rugby (CAR). The tournaments between 2012 and 2014 will also serve as qualifiers for the 2015 Rugby World Cup.

== Changes from last season ==
Changes from the 2011 Africa Cup:

- Morocco and Namibia were relegated from Division 1A to Division 1B after withdrawing from the 2011 event.
- Uganda and Zimbabwe were promoted from Division 1B to Division 1A.
- Ivory Coast were relegated from Division 1B to Division 1C after withdrawing from the 2011 event.
- Senegal were promoted from Division 1C to Division 1B.
- Mauritius and Nigeria were promoted from Division 1D to Division 1C.
- Division 1D was discontinued.
- Division 2 (North) and Division 2 (South) were merged into a single Division 2.
- Algeria and Egypt joined in Division 2.
- Chad withdrew from Division 2 (North).
- Burundi and Rwanda withdrew from Division 2.
- DR Congo, Congo, Gabon, Libya, Mauritania, Réunion, Eswatini and Tanzania - who all withdrew at some stage for the 2011 tournament - were not included in the 2012 tournament.

== Group 1A ==
Group 1A was held from 10 to 14 July in Tunis, Tunisia.

=== Teams ===
The teams competing in Group 1A:

- Kenya
- Tunisia
- Uganda
- Zimbabwe

=== Table ===
2012 Africa Cup Group 1A Classification
Pos	Team
1	Zimbabwe
2	Uganda
3	Kenya
4	Tunisia
Zimbabwe were crowned champions. Tunisia were relegated to Group 1B.

=== Results ===
==== Semi-finals ====
10 July 2012	Tunisia	14 – 30	Zimbabwe	Stade Municipal de Jemmal
				Attendance: 3,000; Referee: (France) Cyril Lafon

10 July 2012	Uganda	21 – 19	Kenya	Stade Municipal de Jemmal
				Attendance: 1,500; Referee: (France) Arnaud Blondel

==== Third place playoff ====
14 July 2012	Tunisia	24 – 31	Kenya	Stade Municipal de Jemmal
	Try: Khalfi; Gmir; Con: Bahraoiui; Pen: Chelly; Bahraoiui; Drop: Aissa; Khalifa		Try: Mose; Ajimo; Onyango (2); Ouma; Con: Mose; Jenis (2)	Attendance: 1,000; Referee: (France) Arnaud Blondel

==== Final ====
14 July 2012

Zimbabwe	22 - 18	Uganda
Try: Karuru 53' c Con: Tambwera (1/1) 54'; Pen: Tambwera 11', 31', 46', 59', 63'		Try: Lubega 70'; Ogwete 77' c Con: Kizza (1/2) 77'; Pen: Kinene 48', 66'

Stade Municipal de Jemmal, Jemmal
Attendance: 1,500
Referee: Cyril Lafon (France)

FB	15	Tangai Nemadire
RW	14	Kuda Chiwanza
OC	13	Josh Rowe
IC	12	Daniel Hondo
LW	11	Gardner Nechirounga
FH	10	Lenience Tambwera
SH	9	Scotty Jones	(substituted off) 75'
N8	8	Norman Mukondiwa
OF	7	Jacques Leitao
BF	6	Shingi Mpofu
RL	5	Costa Dinha	(substituted off) 52'
LL	4	Jan Ferreira	(substituted off) 52'
TP	3	Pieter Joubert	(substituted off) 63'
HK	2	Tatenda Karuru
LP	1	Denford Mutamangira
Replacements:
	16	Prayer Chitenderu
	17	Brian Makamure	(substituted on) 63'
	18	Fortune Chipendu	(substituted on) 52'
	19	Takunda Chifokoyo	(substituted on) 52'
	20	Charles Jiji	(substituted on) 75'
	21	Tichafara Makwanya
	22	Raymond De Jong

FB	15	Benon Kizza
RW	14	Justin Kimono
OC	13	Michael Okobal
IC	12	Paul Kabazzi
LW	11	Bishop Onen		(substituted off) 50'
FH	10	Edmond Tumusiime
SH	9	Anthony Kinene		(substituted off) 63'
N8	8	Marvin Odong		(substituted off) 45'
OF	7	Mathias Ochwo	(yellow card) 57' to 67'
BF	6	Scott Oluoch	(yellow card) 45' to 55'
RL	5	Timothy Dumba		(substituted off) 45'
LL	4	Romano Ogwal
TP	3	Brian Odong		(substituted off) 76'
HK	2	Alex Mubiru		(substituted off) 74'
LP	1	Ronald Adigasi
Replacements:
	16	Solomon Mawanda		(substituted on) 74'
	17	Asuman Mugerwa		(substituted on) 76'
	18	Joel Anguyo		(substituted on) 45'
	19	Steven Ogwete		(substituted on) 45'
	20	Knoren Olwen
	21	Ambrose Kamanyire		(substituted on) 63'
	22	Felix Lubega		(substituted on) 64'

Touch judges:
Bouked Hamda (Tunisia)
Mehdi Hzssayoun (Tunisia)

== Group 1B ==
Group 1B was held from 4–11 July in Antananarivo, Madagascar.

=== Teams ===
The teams competing in Group 1B:

- Madagascar
- Morocco
- Namibia
- Senegal

=== Table ===
2011 Africa Cup Group 1B Classification
Pos	Team
1	Madagascar
2	Namibia
3	Senegal
4	Morocco

Madagascar were promoted to Group 1A.
Morocco were relegated to Group 1C and eliminated from the 2015 Rugby World Cup.

=== Results ===
==== Semi-finals ====
4 July 2012	Madagascar	35 – 28	Morocco	Mahamasina Stadium
13:00 EAT (UTC-03)	Try: Rakotoarimanana (2); Razafindranaivo; Rakotoarisoa; Con: Rakoto Harison (2); Pen: Rakoto Harison (3)	Report	Try: Penalty try Achabar; Sanchez; Boukanoucha; Con: Sanchez (4)	Attendance: 35,000; Referee: (South Africa) Pro Legoete

4 July 2012	Namibia	20 – 18	Senegal	Mahamasina Stadium
15:00 EAT (UTC-03)	Try: Kotzé; Nel; Con: Kotzé (2); Pen: Kotzé; Drop: Kotzé	Report	Pen: Folliot (3); Sargos; Drop: Sargos (2)	Attendance: 35,000; Referee: (South Africa) Mark Lawrence

==== Third place playoff ====
8 July 2012	Morocco	25 – 26	Senegal	Mahamasina Stadium
13:00 EAT (UTC-03)	Try: El Hamzaoui; Rieger; Pen: Rieger (3); Drop: Rieger (2)	Report	Try: Koïta Gros (2); Con: Folliot (2); Pen: Boyer; Sargos; Folliot; Drop: Boyer	Attendance: 40,000; Referee: (South Africa) Pro Legoete

==== Final ====
8 July 2012	Madagascar	57 – 54 (a.e.t.)	Namibia	Mahamasina Stadium
15:00 EAT (UTC-03)	Try: Jacquot Harinirina 2' c Rija Edmond Rakotoarimanana 12' m 18' c 78' c José Rakoto Harison 40' c 80' c Sidonie Rakotoarisoa 86' c Boniface Rebearilala Toussain 100' c Con: José Rakoto Harison 3', 20', 79', 86', 100'; Rija Edmond Rakotoarimanana 40', 80'; Pen: Rakotoarimanana 31'	Report	Try: Lean Stoop 21' c Johnny Redelinghuys 35' c Shaun Esterhuizen 43' m 63' m Chrysander Botha 48' m Petrus Human 66' c Arthur Bouwer 72' c Justin Nel 82' m Con: Theuns Kotzé 22', 36', 68', 73'; Pen: Theuns Kotzé 98'; Drop: Eugene Jantjies 85'	Attendance: 40,000; Referee: (South Africa) Mark Lawrence

Madagascar
FB	15	Bernard Razafindranaivo	(substituted off) 52'
RG	14	Benjaniaina Rakotoarivelo
OC	13	Sidonie Rakotoarisoa
IC	12	Rija Edmond Rakotoarimanana
LW	11	Jacquot Harinirina
FH	10	José Rakoto Harison (c)
SH	9	Bienvenue Mananjarasoa
N8	8	Tahina Randrianarison	(substituted off) 74'
OF	7	Rodolphe Andriambololona
BF	6	Boniface Rebearilala Toussain
RL	5	Claudio Ravelonomenjanahary
LL	4	Tolotra Ratsimba Ramaromiantso
TP	3	Christian Andrianjaka
HK	2	Hasina Rakotoarivelo	(substituted off) 69'
LP	1	Rodolphe Randriamanantena	(substituted off) 56'
Replacements:
	16	Vonjiniana Adriamananjara
	17	Donald Rakotonialoma	(substituted off) 56'
	18	Bruno Rakotonirina	(substituted off) 74'
	19	Tiana Ravelomanantsoa	(substituted off) 69'
	20	Simon Randrianantenaina
	21	Herilaza Ramanoelina
	22	Heriso Rasoanaivo	(substituted off) 52'
Coach:
(Madagascar) Berthin Rafalimanana

Namibia
FB	15	Justin Nel
RW	14	Lean Stoop	(substituted off) 47'
OC	13	Danie Dames
IC	12	Arthur Bouwer
LW	11	Chrysander Botha	(yellow card) 31' to 41'
FH	10	Theuns Kotzé
SH	9	Eugene Jantjies
N8	8	PJ van Lill (c)
OF	7	Morné Blom
BF	6	Petrus Human
RL	5	Heinz Koll
LL	4	Hendrik Franken	(substituted off) 60'
TP	3	Collen Smith
HK	2	Shaun Esterhuizen	(substituted off) 65'
LP	1	Johnny Redelinghuys
Replacements:
	16	Carel Swanepoel	(substituted on) 65'
	17	Martin Goeieman
	18	Shaun du Preez
	19	Harold Kasera	(substituted on) 60'
	20	Herman Ströh	(substituted on) 47' (yellow card) 76' to 86'
	21	Godwin Walters
	22	Roger Thompson
Coach:
(Namibia) Danie Vermeulen

Touch judges:
(Mauritius) Gauthier Ozoux
(Réunion) Willy Pondgera

- Two all-time Test rugby records were set in this match:
  - Namibia's 54 points set a new record for the highest score by a losing team. The previous record was set by Wales in their 50–44 loss to Argentina in Tucumán in 2004.
  - The full-time score of 43–43 was the highest-scoring draw at full-time in history. The previous record was 30–30, set first by South Africa and France at Durban in 2005 and then by Lithuania and Sweden at Kaunas in a 2011 European Nations Cup match.

== Group 1C ==
Group 1C was held on 22–28 July in Gaborone, Botswana. There were three rounds, with no final.

Cameroon withdraw at a very late stage, and as such, the tournament was reduced to a 5-team tournament.

=== Teams ===
The teams competing in Group 1C:

- Botswana
- Ivory Coast
- Mauritius
- Nigeria
- Zambia
- Cameroon - withdrawn

=== Games ===
==== Game Day 1 ====
22 July 2012
14:00

Mauritius	26 – 22	Nigeria
Try: Erik Wiehe Lagesse 5', Jean Philippe Montocchio 34'; Con: Robert Boulle (2); Pen: Robert Boulle (4)		Try: Ejike Uzoigwe 57', Adedoyin Layade 70', David Akinluyi 79'; Con: David Akinluyi (2); Pen: David Akinluyi

UB Stadium, Gaborone, Botswana
Referee: (Uganda) Denis Anguyo

22 July 2012
16:00

Botswana	23 – 15	Zambia
Try: Munyaradzi Mhonda 33', Jerome Alabu 40', Batsile Kabo 53'; Con: Mawela Ntjidzibiki; Pen: Mawela Ntjidzibiki (2)		Try: Benaya Mukwamba 67', Daniel Sakala 80'; Con: Benaya Mukwamba; Drop: Benaya Mukwamba

UB Stadium, Gaborone, Botswana
Referee: (Zimbabwe) Gabriel Masenda

==== Game Day 2 ====
25 July 2012
16:00

Ivory Coast	29 – 17	Nigeria
Try: Kassi Anzian 9', Oscar Lasme 45'; Con: Jean Oulama (2); Pen: Jean Oulama (4); Drop: Jean Oulama		Try: Olawale Doherty 70'; Pen: Aliyu Shelleng (4)

UB Stadium, Gaborone, Botswana
Referee: (Botswana) Emmanuel Masinki

==== Game Day 3 ====
28 July 2012
14:00 CAT

Ivory Coast	24 – 18	Zambia
Try: Issiaka Meite 24', Oscar Lasme 30'; Con: Jean Oulouma; Pen: Jean Oulouma (4)		Try: John Mulenga 7', Angel Chibwe 11'; Con: John Mulenga; Pen: 2 penalties

UB Stadium, Gaborone, Botswana
Referee: (Botswana) Emmanuel Massinki

28 July 2012
16:00 CAT

Botswana	25 – 14	Mauritius
Try: Bernard De Beer 8', Munyaradzi Mhonda 23', Tshoganetso Katse 71'; Con: Eddie Oosthuizen (2); Pen: Eddie Oosthuizen (2)		Try: Erik Wiehe Lagesse 35'; Pen: Dominique Rey (2), Robert Boulle

UB Stadium, Gaborone, Botswana
Referee: (Kenya) Andrew Karani

=== Final table ===
Promoted to 2013 Africa Cup Div 1B

Place	Nation	Games				Points			Table points
Place	Nation	played	won	drawn	lost	for	against	difference	Table points
1	Botswana	2	2	0	0	48	29	+19	8
2	Ivory Coast	2	2	0	0	53	35	+18	8
3	Mauritius	2	1	0	1	40	47	-7	4
4	Zambia	2	0	0	2	33	47	-14	1
5	Nigeria	2	0	0	2	39	55	-16	1

== Division 2 ==
Division 2 was held on 29–30 June in Lomé, Togo. The tournament was played under Rugby 7's laws.

=== Teams ===
The teams competing in Division 2:

- Benin
- Burkina Faso
- Egypt
- Ghana
- Mali
- Niger
- Togo A
- Togo B

=== Pool A ===
Place	Nation	Games				Points			Table points
Place	Nation	played	won	drawn	lost	for	against	difference	Table points
1	Burkina Faso	3	1	2	0	26	19	+7	7
2	Mali	3	2	0	1	26	19	+7	6
3	Egypt	3	1	1	1	40	33	+7	5
4	Benin	3	0	1	2	15	36	-21	2

Match Schedule

29 June 2012	Mali	14 – 7	Egypt

29 June 2012	Burkina Faso	5 – 5	Benin

29 June 2012	Mali	12 – 5	Benin

29 June 2012	Burkina Faso	14 – 14	Egypt

29 June 2012	Mali	0 – 7	Burkina Faso

29 June 2012	Benin	5 – 19	Egypt

=== Pool B ===
Place	Nation	Games				Points			Table points
Place	Nation	played	won	drawn	lost	for	against	difference	Table points
1	Niger	3	3	0	0	38	5	+33	9
2	Ghana	3	2	0	1	22	12	+10	6
3	Togo A	3	1	0	2	17	17	0	3
4	Togo B	3	0	0	3	0	43	-43	0

Match Schedule

29 June 2012	Niger	14 – 0	Togo B

29 June 2012	Ghana	5 – 0	Togo A

29 June 2012	Niger	12 – 0	Togo A

29 June 2012	Ghana	12 – 0	Togo B

29 June 2012	Niger	12 – 5	Ghana

29 June 2012	Togo	17 – 0	Togo B

=== Knockout stage ===
==== Plate Semi-finals ====
Egypt	0 – 0	Togo B

Benin	0 – 12	Togo A

==== Cup Semi-finals ====
Burkina Faso	0 – 10	Ghana

Niger	0 – 0	Mali

==== Seventh-place game ====
Benin	10 – 5	Togo B

==== Plate final ====
Egypt	5 – 7	Togo A

==== Third-place game ====
Burkina Faso	14 – 0	Mali

==== Cup final ====
Ghana	5 – 12	Niger
	Report

== Under-19 ==
An Under-19 competition was held from 25 Aug - 1 Sep in Harare, Zimbabwe. The winner will qualify for the 2013 IRB Junior World Rugby Trophy. The winner of Division B (Madagascar) will replace the last place finisher in Division A (Tunisia) for the 2013 tournament.

=== Teams ===
The teams competing in the Under-19 competition:
Division A

- Kenya
- Namibia
- Tunisia
- Zimbabwe

Division B

- Madagascar
- Morocco
- Zambia

Uganda pulled out of Division B, and was replaced with a Harare U19 Select XV.

=== Division A ===
Place	Nation	Games				Points			Table points
Place	Nation	played	won	drawn	lost	for	against	difference	Table points
1	Namibia	3	3	0	0	127	41	+86	9
2	Zimbabwe	3	2	0	1	78	54	+24	6
3	Kenya	3	1	0	2	43	62	-19	3
4	Tunisia	3	0	0	3	17	108	-91	0

Match Schedule

25 August 2012	Zimbabwe	13 – 10	Kenya	Prince Edward School, Harare, Zimbabwe

25 August 2012	Namibia	44 – 7	Tunisia	Prince Edward School, Harare, Zimbabwe

28 August 2012	Zimbabwe	42 – 0	Tunisia	Prince Edward School, Harare, Zimbabwe

28 August 2012	Namibia	39 – 11	Kenya	Prince Edward School, Harare, Zimbabwe

1 September 2012	Zimbabwe	23 – 44	Namibia	Prince Edward School, Harare, Zimbabwe

1 September 2012	Kenya	22 – 10	Tunisia	Prince Edward School, Harare, Zimbabwe

=== Division B ===
Place	Nation	Games				Points			Table points
Place	Nation	played	won	drawn	lost	for	against	difference	Table points
1	Harare Select XV	3	2	1	0	94	51	+43	7
2	Madagascar	3	2	1	0	81	51	+30	7
3	Morocco	3	1	0	2	64	100	-36	3
4	Zambia	3	0	0	3	47	84	-37	0

Match Schedule

25 August 2012	Harare Select XV	27 – 14	Zambia	Prince Edward School, Harare, Zimbabwe

25 August 2012	Madagascar	34 – 17	Morocco	Prince Edward School, Harare, Zimbabwe

28 August 2012	Harare Select XV	38 – 8	Morocco	Prince Edward School, Harare, Zimbabwe

28 August 2012	Zambia	5 – 18	Madagascar	Prince Edward School, Harare, Zimbabwe

1 September 2012	Harare Select XV	29 – 29	Madagascar	Prince Edward School, Harare, Zimbabwe

1 September 2012	Morocco	39 – 28	Zambia	Prince Edward School, Harare, Zimbabwe

== See also ==
- Africa Cup
- 2015 Rugby World Cup – Africa qualification
