= 2005 CAR Development Trophy =

Tournament details
- Date: 28 May– 12 December 2005
- Teams: 9

Final positions
- Champions: Mauritius
- Runner-up: Burkina Faso

Tournament statistics
- Matches played: 12

The 2005 CAR Development Trophy was the second edition of a second level rugby union tournament in Africa, below the Africa Cup. The competition involved nine teams that were divided into two zones (North and South). The winner of each zone played against each other in a final championship.

In the North Burkina Faso defeated Mali 16-13 in the final. Mauritius was the winner in the South. The championship was played in Mauritius with the home team defeating Burkina Faso 103-3.

== North Zone ==
=== Preliminary ===
28 May 2005

Benin	3 - 3	Niger

Ouagadougou

=== Semifinals ===
2 June 2005

Burkina Faso	39 - 10	Togo

Ouagadougou

2 June 2005

Mali	24 - 3	Benin

Ouagadougou

=== 3rd place final ===
5 June 2005

Togo	13 - 6	Benin

Ouagadougou

=== 1st place final ===
5 June 2005

Burkina Faso	16 - 13	Mali

Ouagadougou

== South Zone ==
6 August 2005

Rwanda	16 - 5	Burundi

Dar es Salaam

6 August 2005

Mauritius	20 - 10	Tanzania

Dar es Salaam

9 August 2005

Tanzania	77 - 0	Burundi

Dar es Salaam

9 August 2005

Mauritius	36 - 7	Rwanda

Dar es Salaam

13 August 2005

Tanzania	beat	Rwanda

Dar es Salaam

13 August 2005

Mauritius	75 - 0	Burundi

Dar es Salaam

- Mauritius won the pool

== Final ==
12 December 2005

Mauritius	103 - 3	Burkina Faso

Port Louis
