= 2009 CAR Development Trophy =

The 2009 CAR Development Trophy was the sixth edition of third (former second) level rugby union tournament in Africa.

In the North the competition involved eight teams that were divided into two pools. At the last minute, Chad was unable to play, so Togo had two teams. The final was played in Togo, with defending champions Niger defeating Ghana with a score of 5-3.

== North Tournament ==
2009 CAR Development Trophy North Section
Tournament details
- Host: Togo
- Date: 11–18 July
- Teams: 7

Final positions
- Champions: Niger
- Runner-up: Ghana

- Pool A

| Team | P | W | D | Lost | For | Ag. | Bonus | Points |
|---|---|---|---|---|---|---|---|---|
| Niger | 3 | 2 | 1 | 0 | 27 | 17 | 0 | 10 |
| Togo | 3 | 2 | 0 | 1 | 14 | 11 | 1 | 9 |
| Mali | 3 | 1 | 1 | 1 | 16 | 28 | 2 | 8 |
| Benin | 3 | 0 | 0 | 3 | 3 | 26 | 2 | 2 |

10 July 2009

| Niger | 10 - 3 | Benin |

Tsévié

10 July 2009

| Togo | 6 - 5 | Mali |

Tsévié

12 July 2009

| Niger | 11 - 11 | Mali |

Tsévié

12 July 2009

| Togo | 5 - 0 | Benin |

Tsévié

14 July 2009

| Niger | 6 - 3 | Togo |

Tsévié

14 July 2009

| Mali | 11 - 0 | Benin |

Tsévié

- Pool B

| Team | P | W | D | Lost | For | Ag. | Bonus | Points |
|---|---|---|---|---|---|---|---|---|
| Ghana | 3 | 2 | 1 | 0 | 66 | 12 | 1 | 11 |
| Burkina Faso | 3 | 2 | 0 | 1 | 67 | 24 | 1 | 9 |
| Nigeria | 3 | 1 | 1 | 1 | 55 | 22 | 1 | 7 |
| Togo "B" | 3 | 0 | 0 | 3 | 0 | 116 | 0 | 0 |

11 July 2009

| Burkina Faso | 17 - 7 | Nigeria |

Tsévié

11 July 2009

| Ghana | 44 - 0 | Togo "B" |

Tsévié

13 July 2009

| Burkina Faso | 43 - 0 | Togo "B" |

Tsévié

13 July 2009

| Ghana | 5 - 5 | Nigeria |

Tsévié

15 July 2009

| Ghana | 17 - 7 | Burkina Faso |

Tsévié

15 July 2009

| Nigeria | 43 - 0 | Togo "B" |

Tsévié

- 7-8th place play off

18 July 2009

| Benin | 29 - 0 | Togo "B" |

Tsévié

- 5-6th place play off

18 July 2009

| Nigeria | 5 - 0 | Mali |

Tsévié

- 3-4th place play off

18 July 2009

| Burkina Faso | 7 - 5 | Togo |

Tsévié

- Final

18 July 2009

| Niger | 5 - 3 | Ghana |

Tsévié
