= African Development Trophy =

African rugby union tournament

- Sport: Rugby union
- Founded: 2004
- First season: 2004
- Folded: 2010
- No. of teams: vary
- Continent: Africa

The African Development Trophy also called CAR Development Trophy was a rugby union tournament organised by Rugby Africa from 2004 to 2010. CAR stands for Confederation of African Rugby. Initially referred to as African Super 16, the name was changed to CAR Castel Beer Trophy in 2008 for sponsorship reasons.

From 2004 to 2008 the tournament was made of the second division teams of African rugby, below those playing in the Africa Cup. In 2009 and 2010 it was the third division, with the second division named the CAR Trophy. Most commonly the competition was divided into North and South tournaments.

In 2011 the competition was restructured into the new Africa Cup tiers.

== Summary ==
=== Second division ===
Year	Pools	Regional Winners				Champions			
Year	Pools	Host	Winner	Score	Runner-up	Host	Winner	Score	Runner-up
(CAR Super 16 Trophy)
2004	North A	Dakar, Senegal	Mali	^{n/a}	Senegal	Bamako, Mali	Botswana	^{n/a}	Mali
2004	North B	Lomé, Togo	Niger	^{n/a}	Togo	Bamako, Mali	Botswana	^{n/a}	Mali
2004	South	Gaborone, Botswana	Botswana	^{n/a}	Swaziland	Bamako, Mali	Botswana	^{n/a}	Mali
2005	North	Ouagadougou, Burkina Faso	Burkina Faso	16–3	Mali	Curepipe, Mauritius	Mauritius	103–3	Burkina Faso
2005	South	Dar es Salaam, Tanzania	Mauritius	^{n/a}	Tanzania	Curepipe, Mauritius	Mauritius	103–3	Burkina Faso
2006	North	Niamey, Niger	Niger	withdraw	Nigeria	Arusha, Tanzania	Tanzania	29–10	Niger
2006	South	Arusha, Tanzania	Tanzania	11–10	Réunion	Arusha, Tanzania	Tanzania	29–10	Niger
2007	North	Lagos, Nigeria	Nigeria	withdraw	Burkina Faso	No competition			
2007	South	Gaborone, Botswana	Botswana	37–14	Tanzania	No competition			
CAR Development Trophy
2008	North	Accra, Ghana	Niger	16–3	Burkina Faso	No competition			
2008	Center	Bujumbura, Burundi	Rwanda	^{n/a}	Burundi	No competition			
2008	South	Curepipe, Mauritius	Réunion	^{n/a}	Mauritius	No competition			

^n/a A round-robin tournament determined the final standings.

=== Third division ===
Year	Pools	Regional Winners			
Year	Pools	Host	Winner	Score	Runner-up
CAR Development Trophy
2009	North	Tsévié, Togo	Niger	5–3	Ghana
2009	South	Gaborone, Botswana	Zimbabwe	23–3	Botswana
2010	North	Cairo, Egypt	Algeria	50–0	Egypt
2010	South	Kigali, Rwanda	Rwanda	12–6	Burundi
2010	South	Bujumbura, Burundi	Rwanda	16–0	Burundi

== See also ==
- Africa Cup
