= Rugby union in Benin =

Benin rugby

Rugby union in Benin is a minor but growing sport.

== Governing body ==
The governing body is affiliated to the Confederation of African Rugby, but not to the International Rugby Board.

== History ==
Rugby union was introduced into Benin by the French, who ruled the country for a number of years as "Dahomey".

Rugby is centred on the national capitals, and main cities, Cotonou and Porto-Novo, both of which are on the south coast. Benin is a slender country, and its poverty and lack of infrastructure make it difficult to maintain a proper national league structure. Benin is one of the poorest countries in the world.

Like many African countries, the historical connection with France is a mixed blessing. For a number of years, Beninois rugby players would leave to play there, which deprived rugby in Benin of any real competition.

The Benin national rugby union team has not competed since 2005, when they appeared in the north section of the CAR Castel Beer Trophy, after being defeated by Togo and Mali and drawing with Niger.

== See also ==
- Confederation of African Rugby
- Africa Cup
