= Rugby union in Mali =

Rugby Union in Mali is a minor but growing sport.

== Governing body ==
The governing body for the sport is the Fédération Malienne de Rugby (Malienne Rugby Federation).

== History ==
Mali was formerly a French colony, and the game was first introduced there by French expatriates. In recent years, the game has been played mostly by native Malians.

Mali is an associate member of Rugby Africa.

== See also ==
- Mali national rugby union team
- Confederation of African Rugby
- Africa Cup
