= Rugby union in Togo =

Rugby union in Togo is a minor but growing sport.

== Governing body ==
The governing body is the Fédération Togolaise de Rugby. It was founded on 21 September 2001, and affiliated to the IRB as an associate member in 2004. It joined the Confederation of African Rugby in the same year.

== History ==
Rugby was originally introduced to Togo by the French. For a long time the Rugby Club de Lomé was the only one.

It was during the 1980s however, that Togo rugby took off, and teams such as the Buffles (Buffalos), Lions, Rhinoceros and Gazelles were set up.

== See also ==
- Togo national rugby union team
- Confederation of African Rugby
- Africa Cup
