= Rugby union in Niger =

Rugby union in Niger is a minor but growing sport.

== Governing body ==
The governing body is the Nigerien Rugby Federation (Federation Nigerienne de Rugby), which is affiliated to the Confederation of African Rugby.

== History ==
Niger was formerly a French colony, and the game was first introduced there by French expatriates. In recent years, the game has been played mostly by natives.

As with many minor rugby nations, the sport is centred on the national capital, Niamey. Niger rates low the Human Development Index, which means it is extremely poor, and lacks the infrastructure that would improve its rugby standing. Niger also suffered from single party rule and corruption problems for a long time. In addition, much of the country is desert, and sparsely populated, meaning that it is difficult to set up a proper national league structure.

Like many African countries, the historical connection with France is a mixed blessing. For a number of years, Nigerien rugby players would leave to play there, which deprived rugby in Niger of any real competition.

== See also ==
- Niger national rugby union team
- Confederation of African Rugby
- Africa Cup
