= Jacquot Harinirina =

- Born: February 24, 1981 (age 45) Antananarivo
- Height: 1.75 m (5 ft 9 in)
- Weight: 83 kg (183 lb; 13 st 1 lb)

Rugby union career
- Position(s): Wing, Fullback, Flyhalf
Amateur team(s)
Years	Team	Apps	(Points)
2004-Present	Tam Nosibe		
International career
Years	Team	Apps	(Points)
- Madagascar

Jacquot Harinirina (born Antananarivo, 24 February 1981), known as Coco, is a Malagasy rugby union player. He plays as a wing, a fullback and a fly-half.

Harinirina plays for Tam Nosibe since 2004/05. He won the Cup of the President in 2013.

He is a regular player for Madagascar, having been the captain of the "Makis" and one of their best try scorers. He was in the team that won surprisingly 2012 Africa Cup defeating Namibia by 57-54 in extra-time.
