= Tsévié =

- Location in Togo
- Coordinates: 6°26′N 1°13′E
- Country: Togo
- Region: Maritime Region

Population (2010)
  - Total: 55,775

Tsévié is a city and canton in the Maritime Region of Togo. It is situated 32 km north of the capital Lomé and at the 2010 Census had a population of 54,474. The city is inhabited primarily by Ewe people. It is the capital of the prefecture of Zio and the Maritime Region.

The town is an important market centre for trading and is noted for its palm oil processing. Tsévié has road and railway links with Notsé, Atakpamé, and Blitta to the north and with Lomé to the south. The inhabitants of the city used to worship idols, but now many follow Christianity. Their traditional celebration is Ayizan, in which they demonstrate their old traditions, but now use this celebration as a symbol for unity and peace. Tsevie is a developing city that attracts many tourists.

== Climate ==
Climate data for Tsevie (1991-2020)
| Month | Jan | Feb | Mar | Apr | May | Jun | Jul | Aug | Sep | Oct | Nov | Dec | Year |
|---|---|---|---|---|---|---|---|---|---|---|---|---|---|
| Average precipitation mm (inches) | 10.6 (0.42) | 34.1 (1.34) | 113.0 (4.45) | 127.1 (5.00) | 132.9 (5.23) | 161.0 (6.34) | 102.1 (4.02) | 41.8 (1.65) | 134.3 (5.29) | 140.5 (5.53) | 53.0 (2.09) | 12.1 (0.48) | 1,062.5 (41.83) |
| Average precipitation days (≥ 1 mm) | 0.9 | 2.6 | 5.8 | 6.7 | 8.3 | 9.1 | 6.4 | 6.0 | 8.1 | 9.3 | 4.9 | 1.2 | 69.3 |
Source: NOAA

== Twin towns – sister cities ==
Tsévié is twinned with:

- Parthenay, France, since 1990
- Plainfaing, France, since 2015

== Notable people ==
- Adjoavi Trenou, activist and politician (1921–2008)
- Bella Bellow, singer (1945–1973)
- Kuami Agboh, football player
- Cyril Guedjé, football player
