= Tanzania national rugby union team =

Tanzania
- Union: Tanzania Rugby Football Union
- Ground(s): Friedkin Recreation Ground, Arusha
- Coach: Mike Beckner
Team kit	Change kit

First international
- Tanzania 52–12 Rwanda (Arusha, Tanzania; 5 April 2004)

Largest win
- Tanzania 77–0 Burundi (Dar es Salaam, Tanzania; 9 August 2005)

Largest defeat
- Eswatini 36–0 Tanzania (Gaborone, Botswana; 2 September 2004)

The Tanzania national rugby union team represents Tanzania in international rugby union. They are known as the Twigas (Swahili for "giraffes"). Tanzania is a member of World Rugby.

In the 1970s, expatriates and Tanzanians regularly played on the national team in an annual competition against Kenya. Tanzania played their first officially recognised international match in 2004, defeating Burundi. Tanzania won the CAR Castel Cup in 2006.

Tanzania won the 2007 CAR Castel Cup Division 2, South Zone, Pool A tournament held in Arusha late June. The 'Twigas' defeated Mayotte 18–11 on June 26 and Rwanda 53–6 on June 30. Burundi were unable to send their team. Tanzania went on to play Botswana, the winner of South Zone, Pool B, in Gaborone on 18 August. Tanzania lost 14–37.

== Record ==
Below is a table of the representative rugby matches played by a Tanzania national XV at test level up until 19 June 2010, updated after match with Mauritius.

Opponent	Played	Won	Lost	Drawn	% Won
Botswana	2	0	2	0	0%
Burundi	3	3	0	0	100%
Eswatini	1	0	1	0	0%
Kenya A	1	1	0	0	100%
Mauritius	3	0	3	0	0%
Mayotte	2	2	0	0	100%
Niger	1	1	0	0	100%
Réunion	2	1	1	0	50%
Rwanda	3	3	0	0	100%
Uganda A	1	0	1	0	0%
Total	19	11	8	0	57.89%

== See also ==
- East Africa rugby union team
- Rugby union in Tanzania

== Notes ==
a. The first match for both Kenya and Tanzania (Tanganyika at the time) took place in 1954 at Arusha. It was held shortly before the First Tuskers Copperbelt tour later that year and served as a selection trial for the tour. This match was won by Kenya though the exact score is not known. The next year the fixture was repeated, again at Arusha, Tanganyika winning by 11 points to 3. The third match occurred a year later in 1956, again at Arusha; Kenya winning this encounter 0–13.
