= Burundi national rugby union team =

National Rugby Union Team representing Burundi

Burundi
- Union: Burundi Rugby Union
First colours

World Rugby ranking
- Current: 104 (as of 4 November 2024)
- Highest: 103

First international
- Uganda A 100–0 Burundi (Lusaka, Zambia; 9 September 2003)

Biggest win
- Burundi 27–0 DR Congo (Kigali, Rwanda; 5 June 2014)

Biggest defeat
- Uganda A 100–0 Burundi (Lusaka, Zambia; 9 September 2003)

The Burundi national rugby union team represents Burundi in international rugby union. The nation are a member of the International Rugby Board (IRB) and have yet to play in a Rugby World Cup tournament. The Burundi national rugby team played their first international in 2003 - losing to Uganda. They participate annually in the CAR Castel Beer Trophy. However, in the 2007 tournament Burundi withdrew for financial reasons.

== History ==
Rugby has been played in Burundi since the 1970s, first among Belgian players who mixed during the 1980s with many French residents. The first officially registered rugby team was the “Intambwe Rugby Club”. The first presidents were Stanislas Mandi and Christian Taupiac. Among the greatest players are Marc Bourgeois, Charles Mugiraneza, “Okume”, Bernard Bordes, Patrice Ndindakumana, Lilian Campan, Louis Riboli, and Simeon Sahabo. The IRC has played international matches against the French, Rwandese and Kenyan teams.

The Fédération Burundaise de Rugby, the governing body for rugby union in Burundi, was founded in 2001. The FBR became a member union of Rugby Africa in 2003, and became a full member of World Rugby in 2021. As a result, the team competed in the 2023 Rugby World Cup – Africa qualification. They lost both of their matches, to Burkina Faso and Cameroon.

== Record ==
Below is a table of the representative rugby matches played by a Burundi national XV at test level up until 9 June 2021, updated after match with Cameroon.

Opponent	Played	Won	Lost	Drawn	% Won
Burkina Faso	1	0	1	0	0%
Cameroon	1	0	1	0	0%
DR Congo	2	2	0	0	100%
Lesotho	1	0	1	0	0%
Mauritius	1	0	1	0	0%
Rwanda	13	1	12	0	7.69%
Tanzania	3	0	3	0	0%
Uganda A	1	0	1	0	0%
Total	23	3	20	0	13.04%
