= Eswatini national rugby union team =

Eswatini
- Union: Eswatini Rugby Union

World Rugby ranking
- Current: 105 (as of 4 November 2024)
- Highest: 98 (2025)
- Lowest: 105 (2024)

First international
- Botswana 23–8 Eswatini (Gaborone, Botswana; 1 July 1998)

Biggest win
- Eswatini 36–0 Tanzania (Gaborone, Botswana; 2 September 2004)

Biggest defeat
- Mauritius 134–0 Eswatini (Gaborone, Botswana; 21 June 2014)

The Eswatini national rugby union team represent Eswatini in the sport of rugby union. They are ranked as a tier-three nation by the International Rugby Board (IRB). Eswatini have thus far not qualified for a Rugby World Cup, but have competed in qualifying tournaments.

== History ==
In September 2001 then-Swaziland played in the African qualification tournaments for the 2003 Rugby World Cup in Australia. They lost their first match, in Pool B of Round 1, losing to Botswana. They lost to Madagascar in their second game.

Eswatini participated in the African qualifying tournament for the 2007 Rugby World Cup, playing in the Southern Pool of Round 1a, along with Zambia and Botswana. Swaziland won their first fixture, defeating Zambia by one point, 24 to 23. However they lost their second game 19-12 to Botswana, and finished third in the final standings on points difference.

== Record ==
Below is a table of the representative rugby matches played by an Eswatini national XV at test level up until 31 October 2026, updated after match with Botswana.

Nation	Games	Won	Lost	Drawn	Percentage of wins
Botswana	11	0	10	1	0%
Lesotho	6	1	5	0	16.67%
Madagascar	1	0	1	0	0%
Malawi	1	1	1	0	100%
Mauritius	2	0	2	0	0%
Mozambique	2	0	2	0	0%
Nigeria	1	0	1	0	0%
Réunion	1	0	1	0	0%
Tanzania	1	1	0	0	100%
Zambia	2	1	1	0	50%
Total	28	4	23	1	14.29%
