= Botswana national rugby union team =

Botswana
- Nickname: The Vultures
- Union: Botswana Rugby Union
- Head coach: Andrew Paxinos; Ian Greaves
First colours

World Rugby ranking
- Current: 77 (as of 4 November 2024)
- Highest: 74
- Lowest: 77 (2020)

First international
- Zimbabwe 130–10 Botswana (Bulawayo, Zimbabwe; 7 September 1996)

Biggest win
- Botswana 111–3 Eswatini (Gaborone, Botswana; 25 February 2023)

Biggest defeat
- Zimbabwe 130–10 Botswana (Bulawayo, Zimbabwe; 7 September 1996)

The Botswana national rugby union team represents Botswana in the sport of rugby union. Botswana have thus far not played in a Rugby World Cup, but have participated in qualifying tournaments. They are currently ranked 77th in the world.

== History ==
Botswana played their first ever international on September 7, 1996, against Zimbabwe, losing 130 to 10. Their first win came in 2001 in a match against Swaziland, winning 13 points to 3. Also in 2001 they participated in African qualifying tournaments for the 2003 Rugby World Cup in Australia. In 2004 Botswana won four internationals in a row, defeating Tanzania, Swaziland, Nigeria and Mali.

Botswana then participated in the Africa qualifying tournaments for the 2007 Rugby World Cup in France. They were grouped in the Southern Pool of Round 1a, along with nations Zambia and Swaziland. In their first game against Zambia in Lusaka, they lost 28 to 24. However they won their second match 19 to 12 over Swaziland in Botswana. They finished second in the pool and did not advance to the next round. Julian Harris made History by representing Botswana national rugby union team at the young age of 16 years playing on the wing, as far as possibly known making him the youngest rugby union international in the world

== World Cup record ==
- 1987 - 1991 - Did not enter
- 1995 - 2027 - Did not qualify

== Overall record ==
Below is a table of the representative rugby matches played by a Botswana national XV at test level up until 31 October 2026, updated after match with Eswatini.

Opponent	Played	Won	Lost	Drawn	% Won
Arabian Gulf	1	0	1	0	0%
Cameroon	1	1	0	0	100%
Eswatini	12	11	1	0	91.67%
Ghana	1	0	1	0	0%
Ivory Coast	2	0	2	0	0%
Kenya	1	0	1	0	0%
Lesotho	3	3	0	0	100%
Madagascar	5	0	5	0	0%
Mali	1	1	0	0	100%
Mauritius	3	2	1	0	66.67%
Mayotte	1	1	0	0	100%
Morocco	1	0	1	0	0%
Namibia	1	0	1	0	0%
Namibia A	1	0	1	0	0%
Netherlands	1	0	1	0	0%
Nigeria	1	1	0	0	100%
Réunion	3	1	2	0	33.33%
Senegal	3	1	2	0	33.33%
Tanzania	2	2	0	0	100%
Tunisia	2	0	2	0	0%
Uganda	3	0	3	0	0%
Zambia	12	4	8	0	33.33%
Zimbabwe	4	0	4	0	0%
Zimbabwe A	1	0	1	0	0%
Total	65	28	36	1	43.08%

== See also ==
- Rugby union in Botswana
