= Mauritius national rugby union team =

Mauritius
- Union: Rugby Union Mauritius
- Head coach: Julien Blazy
- Captain: Oliver Baissac
First colours	Second colours

World Rugby ranking
- Current: 100 (as of 15 November 2026)
- Highest: 90 (23 November 2020)
- Lowest: 100 (2026)

First international
- Mauritius 20-10 Tanzania (6 August 2005)

Biggest win
- Mauritius 134 - 0 Eswatini (21 June 2014)

Biggest defeat
- Ivory Coast 83-3 Mauritius (26 June 2013)

The Mauritius national rugby union team represents Mauritius in international rugby union. Mauritius is a member of World Rugby, but the national team is ranked as third tier, and Mauritius have yet to compete in either the Africa Cup or Rugby World Cup.

Rugby Union Mauritius represents Mauritius internationally and is member of CAR (Confederation Africaine de Rugby), AROI (Association de Rugby Ocean Indien), World Rugby and FIT (Federation of International Touch).

The national side is ranked 100th in the world.

== History ==
Introduced by the English Army (Colonial Time 1810 to 1968 Independence) Rugby started in the early 1900s in Mauritius. The game was then introduced to the Franco-Mauritians by a group of rugby players who created the Dodo Club in 1928 which enhanced the start of Rugby competition on the island. From 1928 to 1975 rugby was played at senior level between various clubs remembered as the Buffalos, HMS Mauritius, Blue Ducks, Dodo, the Navy, SMF and the Stags.

Stags and the Dodo remained active and competed against one another resulting in the closure of the Stags in 1982. The Dodo Club remained the only active club which carried on developing the passion and culture of this sport, but unfortunately due to the retreat of the Dodo Club in all sports at national level, there was a need to phase out rugby from this club in order to develop the sport at a regional level.

During these times, many youngsters went to boarding schools in South-Africa and England. Others went to university in South-Africa, England, France and Australia, and when they came back to Mauritius on holidays, there was a need to play rugby and show their friends that they did not only study overseas. This created an enthusiastic rugby atmosphere which led to traditional games between The Students and local players.

Between 1992 and 2001 various tours were organised to Reunion Island participating to seven a side tournaments and XV rugby.

We participated in the Kenya Safaris Sevens in 1996 and 1997.

In 1995, during the third rugby World Cup in South Africa, six games were broadcast for the first time on Mauritian TV. 1996 saw the birth of the Mauritian Seven a side Tournament with 4 Teams. In 1997 we started a development program in schools which led to the creation of three coaching centres in different parts of the island in 2003.

In 1998, the Stags Club was re-created and thus triggered the thought that rugby had a place in the Mauritian Sport and the potential needed to be exploited. Mauritius rugby needed to be given a chance and the means for development at a national level. After three years of competition with clubs from surrounding countries and more players getting attracted by the rugby fever leading to an increasing demand for the creation of new clubs, three new regions/clubs were created in 2001 : The Curepipe Starlights, the Northern Pirates and the Western Cowboys.

Currently, there are 4 Clubs in Division A and 6 Clubs in Division B, 3 Coaching Centres, around 650 licensed members, 18 Coaches, 6 Referees, National Sides in Senior (7s & XV) Under 18 (7s). Players come from all over the island and various backgrounds to play Rugby. Rugby has begun to develop through the CSR for marginalized groups and in rural areas as Black River, La Gaulette, Petite Riviere Noire, La Source, Quatre Bornes, Roches Bois and the north of the island.

== Competitions ==
The National Team has been participating in AROI and CAR competitions as follows :- Africa cup 1B in Uganda. 2015. Africa cup 1c in Botswana 2014. - winner

- Africa Cup 1 D in Johannesburg - Winner against Nigeria
- 2010 : CAR Tournament in Tanzania - Winner against Tanzania
- 2009 : CAR Tournament in Botswana - Ranking 2nd
- 2008 : Hosted CAR Tournament in Mauritius - Ranking 2nd
- 2007 : CAR Tournament in Botswana - Ranking 3rd Senior and 2nd Junior
- 2006 : CAR Tournament in Reunion - Ranking 2nd
- 2005 : Hosted CAR Tournament in Mauritius - Won against Burkina Faso
- 2005 : CAR Tournament in Tanzania - Winner

Until 2010 RUM was in Africa Cup Division 2 and since 2011, played in first Division Group D and won it. This year we will be participating in Division 1 group C from 22 to 29 July in Botswana and will be in competition with the following countries: Botswana, Zambia, Cameroon, Ivory Coast, Nigeria

In 2015, Mauritius compete against Sénégal, Uganda And Madagascar

== Overall ==
Below is a table of the representative rugby matches played by a Mauritius national XV at test level up until 2 November 2025, updated after match with Réunion.

Opponent	Played	Won	Lost	Drawn	% Won
Botswana	3	1	2	0	33.33%
Burkina Faso	1	1	0	0	100%
Burundi	1	1	0	0	100%
Eswatini	2	2	0	0	100%
France A	2	0	2	0	0%
Ghana	1	0	1	0	0%
Ivory Coast	1	0	1	0	0%
Kenya A	1	0	1	0	0%
Lesotho	1	1	0	0	100%
Madagascar	1	0	1	0	0%
Mayotte	2	2	0	0	100%
Morocco	1	0	1	0	0%
Niger	1	0	1	0	0%
Nigeria	4	2	2	0	50%
Réunion	19	9	10	0	47.37%
Rwanda	2	1	1	0	50%
Senegal	2	0	2	0	0%
Tanzania	3	3	0	0	100%
Uganda	1	0	1	0	0%
Zambia	3	2	1	0	66.67%
Zimbabwe	1	0	1	0	0%
Total	53	25	28	0	47.17%
