= Ghana national rugby union team =

Ghana international rugby union

Ghana
- Union: Ghana Rugby Football Union
- Head coach: Amuzu Salim
First colours

World Rugby ranking
- Current: 87 (as of 4 November 2024)
- Highest: 85 (2024)
- Lowest: 87 (2020)

First international
- Ghana 29–8 Mauritania (Bamako, Mali; 5 October 2003)

Biggest win
- Ghana 57–O Rwanda (Accra, Ghana; 9 May 2018)

Biggest defeat
- Uganda 53–12 Ghana (Kampala, Uganda; 10 July 2021)

The Ghana national rugby union team represents Ghana in international rugby union. Ghana are a member of the International Rugby Board (IRB), and as of 2019 had not played in a Rugby World Cup tournament.

Ghana played their first international game during the 2003 season, and defeated Mauritania by 29 points to 8. Since then there have been a number of youth teams in Ghana; the under-18 team won a junior rugby competition. The National Team itself has hosted a tournament and had some credible results on the field.

== History ==
After forming in 2005, the Ghana National Rugby Union Team has played in a number of competitions. The team was founded by a coach from Cameroon named Guy Chaley who recruited players, including coach Amuzu Salim, to play their first international match. Support, but not funding, from the government was gained for the national team. Shortly after they were played in their first African Tournament. This was followed by the death of Guy Chaley which stunted the success and growth of the team. Amuzu Salim was then able to train as a coach to train the Ghana Under 18, 15 and 12 teams. Notable gap year helpers include Peter Dear who helped start the school program in Accra and surrounding areas; he donated kit, as well as former Swedish international player Ben Gandy. Since the first tournament, the team have been included in the Castel Beer Trophies which are development tournament for smaller rugby nations of Africa. The country reached the final of the 2009 Development Trophy in Togo.

== Record ==
Below is a table of the representative rugby matches played by a Ghana national XV at test level up until 3 December 2025, updated after match with Ivory Coast.

Opponent	Played	Won	Lost	Drawn	Win %	For	Aga	Diff
Algeria	1	1	0	0	100%	22	20	+2
Benin	6	5	0	1	83.33%	150	31	+119
Botswana	1	1	0	0	100%	36	25	+11
Burkina Faso	6	2	4	0	33.33%	56	76	-20
Cameroon	1	0	1	0	0%	3	40	-37
Chad	1	1	0	0	100%	17	8	+9
Ivory Coast	3	1	2	0	33.33%	51	53	-2
Mali	3	0	3	0	0%	18	69	-51
Mauritania	1	1	0	0	100%	29	8	+21
Mauritius	1	1	0	0	100%	23	17	+6
Niger	3	0	3	0	0%	16	62	-46
Nigeria	8	2	5	1	25%	104	157	-53
Rwanda	1	1	0	0	100%	57	0	+57
Senegal	1	0	1	0	0%	0	38	-38
Togo	8	5	3	0	62.5%	99	70	+29
Togo A	1	1	0	0	100%	44	0	+44
Uganda	1	0	1	0	0%	12	53	-41
Zambia	1	0	1	0	0%	22	31	-9
Total	48	22	24	2	45.83%	759	758	+1

== See also ==
- Rugby union in Ghana
- CAR Castel Beer Trophy
