= Benin national rugby union team =

Benin
- Union: Fédération Béninoise de Rugby

First international
- Mali 56–0 Benin (Bamako, Mali; 5 October 2003)

Largest win
- Benin 38–0 Guinea (Bamako, Mali; 2 July 2026)

Largest defeat
- Benin 5–82 Niger (Ouagadougou, Burkina Faso; 27 May 2015)

World Cup
- Appearances: 0

The Benin national rugby union team represents Benin in international rugby union. Benin became an associate member of World Rugby in October 2025, and have yet to play in a Rugby World Cup tournament.

== History ==
They have competed in the north section of the CAR Castel Beer Trophy, but last appeared in 2005 being defeated by Togo and Mali and drawing with Niger.

In 2017 the team participated in the Rugby Africa Regional Challenge Group West 1, losing their first match to Ghana in the Accra Sports Stadium with 46-5. In 2018 they participated in the Rugby Africa Regional Sevens tournament, finishing seventh out of eight.

== Record ==
Below is a table of the representative rugby matches played by a Benin national XV at test level up until 8 July 2026, updated after match with Mali.

Opponent	Played	Won	Lost	Drawn	Win %	For	Aga	Diff
Burkina Faso	2	0	2	0	0%	3	108	-105
Chad	1	1	0	0	100%	19	11	+8
Congo	1	0	1	0	0%	17	53	-36
Ghana	6	0	5	1	0%	31	150	-119
Guinea	1	1	0	0	100%	38	0	+38
Mali	5	0	5	0	0%	11	174	-163
Mali A	1	0	1	0	0%	0	3	-3
Mauritania	1	1	0	0	100%	6	0	+6
Niger	6	2	3	1	33.33%	61	170	-109
Nigeria	4	0	4	0	0%	12	163	-151
Senegal	1	0	1	0	0%	6	25	-19
Togo	10	3	7	0	30%	79	164	-85
Togo A	1	0	1	0	100%	29	0	+29
Total	40	8	30	2	17.5%	312	1,021	-709

== See also ==
- Rugby union in Benin
