= Rwanda national rugby union team =

Rwanda
- Nickname: Silverbacks
- Union: Rwanda Rugby Federation
- Head coach: (Ivory Coast) Claude Ezoua
- Captain: Benjamin Macombe
First colours

World Rugby ranking
- Current: 98 (as of 4 November 2024)
- Lowest: 99 (2024)

First international
- Zambia 107-9 Rwanda (Lusaka, Zambia; 9 September 2003)

Biggest win
- Rwanda 39-13 Burundi (Kigali, Rwanda; 24 November 2010)

Biggest defeat
- Zambia 107-9 Rwanda (Lusaka, Zambia; 9 September 2003)

The Rwanda national rugby union team represents Rwanda in international rugby union. Rwanda are an associate member of the International Rugby Board (IRB), and have yet to play in a Rugby World Cup qualifying tournament.

The Rwanda national team made their international debut in a match against Zambia in 2003, lost by 9-107, for the CAR Division 2. They won their subsequent international against Burundi by 18-5.

== Record ==
Below is a table of the representative rugby matches played by a Rwanda national XV at test level up until 23 November 2019, updated after match with Ivory Coast.

Opponent	Played	Won	Lost	Drawn	% Won
Burundi	13	12	1	0	92.31%
DR Congo	3	0	3	0	0%
Ghana	1	0	1	0	0%
Ivory Coast	1	0	1	0	0%
Lesotho	1	1	0	0	100%
Mauritius	2	1	1	0	50%
Mayotte	1	0	1	0	0%
Tanzania	3	0	3	0	0%
Zambia	2	0	2	0	0%
Total	27	14	13	0	51.85%
