= Burkina Faso national rugby union team =

Burkina Faso
- Union: Burkina Faso Rugby Federation
- Head coach: Ahmed Coulibaly; Laurent Stravato

World Rugby ranking
- Current: 92 (as of 4 November 2024)
- Highest: 90 (2024)
- Lowest: 92 (2024)

First international
- Mali 40–12 Burkina Faso (Dakar, Senegal; 7 June 2004)

Biggest win
- Burkina Faso 67–3 Benin (Ouagadougou, Burkina Faso; 24 May 2015)

Biggest defeat
- Mauritius 103–3 Burkina Faso (12 December 2005)

The Burkina Faso national rugby union team represents Burkina Faso in international rugby union. Burkina Faso have yet to play in a Rugby World Cup tournament.

They compete in the north section of the CAR Development Trophy. The national coaches are Ahmed Coulibaly and Laurent Stravato.

== Record ==
Below is a table of the representative rugby matches played by the Burkina Faso national XV at test level up until 28 July 2024, updated after match with Ivory Coast.

Opponent	Played	Won	Lost	Drawn	% Won
African Barbarians	1	1	0	0	100%
Benin	2	2	0	0	100%
Burundi	1	1	0	0	100%
Cameroon	1	1	0	0	100%
Chad	3	3	0	0	100%
Congo	1	1	0	0	100%
Ghana	6	4	2	0	66.67%
Ivory Coast	2	0	2	0	0%
Mali	7	4	3	0	57.14%
Mauritania	1	1	0	0	100%
Mauritius	1	0	1	0	0%
Namibia	2	0	2	0	0%
Niger	5	1	3	1	20%
Nigeria	1	1	0	0	100%
Senegal	2	0	2	0	0%
Togo	5	5	0	0	100%
Togo A	1	1	0	0	100%
Uganda	1	0	1	0	0%
Zimbabwe	2	0	2	0	0%
Total	43	25	17	1	58.14%

== See also ==
- Rugby union in Burkina Faso
