= Niger national rugby union team =

Niger
First international
- Benin 3–3 Niger (Ouagadougou, Burkina Faso; 28 May 2005)

Largest win
- Benin 5–82 Niger (Ouagadougou, Burkina Faso; 27 May 2015)

Largest defeat
- Morocco 77–3 Niger (Yamoussoukro, Côte d'Ivoire; 23 June 2013)

World Cup
- Appearances: 0

The Niger national rugby union team represents Niger in international rugby union. Niger are a member of the International Rugby Board (IRB), and have yet to play in a Rugby World Cup tournament. Niger were the runner up to Tanzania in the CAR Castel Beer Trophy in 2006, but won the northern section.

== Record ==
Below is a table of the representative rugby matches played by a Greece national XV at test level up until 12 July 2026, updated after match with Guinea.

Opponent	Played	Won	Lost	Drawn	% Won
African Barbarians	1	1	0	0	100%
Benin	6	3	2	1	50%
Burkina Faso	5	3	1	1	60%
Chad	2	2	0	0	100%
Congo	1	1	0	0	100%
Ghana	3	3	0	0	100%
Guinea	1	0	1	0	0%
Mali	8	3	3	2	37.5%
Mali A	2	1	1	0	50%
Mauritius	1	1	0	0	100%
Morocco	1	0	1	0	0%
Nigeria	1	0	1	0	0%
Senegal	1	0	1	0	0%
Tanzania	1	0	1	0	0%
Togo	5	3	2	0	60%
Zambia	2	0	2	0	0%
Total	41	21	16	4	51.22%
