= Mali national rugby union team =

Mali sports team

Mali
- Union: Mali Rugby Federation

World Rugby ranking
- Current: N/A (as of )

First international
- Mali 56–0 Benin (Bamako, Mali; 5 October 2003)

Biggest win
- Mali 81–0 Mauritania (Dakar, Senegal; 9 June 2004)

Biggest defeat
- Mali 0–49 Cameroon (Bamako, Mali; 12 October 2003)

The Mali national rugby union team represents Mali in international rugby union. Mali are a member of the International Rugby Board (IRB), and have yet to play in a Rugby World Cup. The Mali national rugby team played their first international against Benin in 2003, winning the match. They also defeated Senegal that season. In 2005, Mali made history, by winning their first northern section crown of the CAR Castel Beer Trophy. The popularity of the sport of rugby in Mali is on the rise.

== Record ==
Below is a table of the representative rugby matches played by a Mali national XV at test level up until 12 July 2026, updated after match with Togo.

Men's World Rugby Rankings Top 30 as of 28 September 2026
Rank	Change (Note: Change from the previous week)	Team	Points
1	Steady	South Africa	93.09
2	Steady	New Zealand	91.15
3	Steady	Ireland	88.08
4	Steady	France	87.43
5	Steady	England	85.68
6	▲1	Australia	85.55
7	▼1	Scotland	84.78
8	Steady	Argentina	82.24
9	Steady	Japan	77.28
10	Steady	Fiji	76.81
11	Steady	Wales	76.38
12	Steady	Italy	76.30
13	Steady	Georgia	73.94
14	Steady	Portugal	69.39
15	Steady	United States	67.58
16	Steady	Chile	66.94
17	Steady	Spain	66.83
18	Steady	Uruguay	65.75
19	Steady	Tonga	65.14
20	Steady	Samoa	64.73
21	Steady	Romania	62.45
22	Steady	Canada	62.29
23	Steady	Belgium	61.03
24	Steady	Hong Kong	60.74
25	Steady	Zimbabwe	57.68
26	Steady	Namibia	56.96
27	Steady	Netherlands	56.44
28	Steady	Switzerland	55.47
29	Steady	Czech Republic	54.78
30	Steady	Poland	54.54

Source: World Rugby
Graph updated to 24 August 2026

Team	Mat	Won	Lost	Draw	%
Benin	5	5	0	0	100%
Botswana	1	0	1	0	0%
Burkina Faso	7	3	4	0	42.86%
Cameroon	1	0	1	0	0%
Chad	4	2	2	0	50%
Ghana	3	3	0	0	100%
Guinea	1	1	0	0	100%
Ivory Coast	1	0	1	0	0%
Mauritania	1	1	0	0	100%
Niger	9	4	3	2	44.44%
Nigeria	3	2	1	0	66.67%
Senegal	3	2	1	0	66.67%
Togo	5	3	2	0	60%
Total	44	26	16	2	59.09%
