= Togo national rugby union team =

Togo
- Union: FÉDÉRATION TOGOLAISE DE RUGBY
- Coach: ISAAC HOMENU

First international
- Togo 9-15 Nigeria (28 Oct. 2001)

Largest win
- Togo 63-0 Benin (10 June 2013)

Largest defeat
- Togo 3-80 Cameroon (05 Oct. 2003)

The Togo national rugby union team represents Togo in international rugby union. Togo are a member of the International Rugby Board (IRB), and have yet to play in a Rugby World Cup tournament. Togo played their first international in 2001, losing to Nigeria. They won their first match in 2003, defeating Mauritania.

== Overall Record ==
Below is a table of the representative rugby matches played by a Togo national XV at test level up until 12 July 2026, updated after match with Mali.

Opponent	Played	Won	Lost	Drawn	Win %	For	Aga	Diff
Benin	10	7	3	0	70%	164	79	+85
Burkina Faso	5	0	5	0	0%	52	87	-35
Cameroon	1	0	1	0	0%	3	80	-77
Chad	1	0	1	0	0%	0	13	-13
Ghana	8	3	5	0	37.5%	70	99	-29
Guinea	1	1	0	0	100%	15	8	+7
Mali	5	2	3	0	40%	35	65	-30
Mauritania	1	1	0	0	100%	16	7	+9
Niger	5	2	3	0	25%	66	93	-27
Nigeria	3	0	2	1	0%	20	35	-15
Senegal	2	0	2	0	0%	6	73	-67
Total	42	16	25	1	38.1%	447	639	-192
