= 2007 Africa Cup =

8th Africa Cup
Tournament details
- Date: 26 May 2007 – 27 November 2007
- Teams: 12

Final positions
- Champions: Uganda
- Runner-up: Madagascar

Tournament statistics
- Matches played: 16

The 2007 Africa Cup was the eighth edition of highest level rugby union tournament in Africa. The competition involved twelve teams that were divided into two zones (North and South). Each zone was then divided into two pools of three. Each pool winner then qualified for a semi-final; the semi-final winners then played each other in the final.

== Nations ==
The teams competing were:

- Cameroon
- Ivory Coast
- Kenya
- Madagascar
- Morocco
- Namibia
- Senegal
- South Africa Amateurs°
- Tunisia
- Uganda
- Zambia
- Zimbabwe

°South Africa sent only amateur players.

== Division 1 (Africa Cup) ==
=== Pool stage ===
Pool winners qualify for the semi-finals.

Bonus point system: 4 points for a win, 2 for a draw, 0 for a loss, 1 point for scoring four tries in a game, 1 point for losing by seven or less.

==== North Pool Group A ====
Place	Nation	Games				Points		Bonus	Table points
Place	Nation	played	won	drawn	lost	for	against	Bonus	Table points
1	Kenya	2	2	0	0	45	35	0	8
2	Morocco	2	1	0	1	36	29	1	5
3	Cameroon	2	0	0	2	25	42	1	1

26 May 2007

Morocco	20 – 6	Cameroon

Casablanca

23 June 2007

Kenya	23 – 16	Morocco

Nairobi

7 July 2007

Cameroon	19 – 22	Kenya

Yaoundé

==== North Pool Group B ====
Place	Nation	Games				Points		Bonus	Table points
Place	Nation	played	won	drawn	lost	for	against	Bonus	Table points
1	Ivory Coast	2	2	0	0	28	24	0	8
2	Tunisia	2	1	0	1	25	22	1	5
3	Senegal	2	0	0	2	16	23	2	2

26 May 2007

Senegal	10 – 12	Ivory Coast

Dakar

23 June 2007

Tunisia	11 – 6	Senegal

Tunis

7 July 2007

Ivory Coast	16 – 14	Tunisia

Abidjan

==== South Pool Group A ====
Place	Nation	Games				Points		Bonus	Table points
Place	Nation	played	won	drawn	lost	for	against	Bonus	Table points
1	Uganda	2	2	0	0	41	24	0	8
2	Namibia	2	1	0	1	102	30	2	6
3	Zambia	2	0	0	2	15	104	0	0

26 May 2007

Namibia	83 – 10	Zambia

Windhoek

23 June 2007

Uganda	20 – 19	Namibia

Kampala

7 July 2007

Zambia	5 – 21	Uganda

Lusaka

==== South Pool Group B ====
Place	Nation	Games				Points		Bonus	Table points
Place	Nation	played	won	drawn	lost	for	against	Bonus	Table points
1	Madagascar	2	2	0	0	51	29	0	8
2	South Africa Amateurs	2	1	0	1	45	29	1	5
3	Zimbabwe	2	0	0	2	37	75	1	1

26 May 2007

South Africa Amateurs	45 – 8	Zimbabwe

Johannesburg

23 June 2007

Madagascar	21 – 0 (withdrew)	South Africa Amateurs

7 July 2007

Zimbabwe	29 – 30	Madagascar

Harare

=== Knockout stage ===
Played in Antananarivo, Madagascar.

==== Semi-finals ====
26 September 2007

Uganda	24 – 12	Kenya

Antananarivo

26 September 2007

Madagascar	32 – 25	Ivory Coast

Antananarivo

==== Third place play-off ====
29 September 2007

Kenya	20 – 17	Ivory Coast

Antananarivo

==== Final ====
29 September 2007

Uganda	42 – 11	Madagascar

Mahamasina Municipal Stadium, Antananarivo
