= 2019–20 Rugby Africa Cup =

International rugby union competition Africa

20th Africa Cup

The 2019-20 Rugby Africa Cup is the first season of a restructuring of international rugby union competition by Rugby Africa after a loss of broadcast sponsorship caused the cancellation of the 2019 Rugby Africa Gold Cup, itself only the third edition of a previous restructuring of the continent's tournament.

The new Rugby Africa Cup replaces the multi-tiered Gold, Silver, and Bronze Cups with a seeded group stage followed by a knockout round. This results in fewer matches being played, but also greatly reduced costs and travel times from the round-robin Gold Cup.

The group stage of the tournament was cancelled due to the COVID-19 pandemic.

== Structure ==
The top sixteen nations in African rugby enter the competition, with the bottom eight entering in the elimination stage. Each team plays a single match and the four winners move onto the group stage, with four groups of three. The four group winners then enter the semi-finals.

== Seeding ==
The sixteen participating teams were seeded as follows:

(World Rankings taken from November 13, 2019)

Location of teams in the 2019-20 Rugby Africa Cup
Teams entering in group stage
Teams entering in elimination stage

Seed	Team	2018 position	WR Ranking
1	Namibia	1st Gold Cup	22
2	Kenya	2nd Gold Cup	32
3	Uganda	3rd Gold Cup	41
4	Tunisia	4th Gold Cup	39
5	Zimbabwe	5th Gold Cup	34
6	Algeria	1st Silver Cup	n/a
7	Morocco	6th Gold Cup	48
8	Zambia	2nd Silver Cup	67
9	Madagascar	3rd Silver Cup	51
10	Ivory Coast	4th Silver Cup	43
11	Senegal	5th Silver Cup	54
12	Ghana	1st Bronze Cup	92
13	Botswana	6th Silver Cup	71
14	Mauritius	2nd Bronze Cup	93
15	Rwanda	3rd Bronze Cup	95
16	Nigeria	n/a	70

== Elimination stage ==
The elimination stage matches will be played from November to December 2019

Elimination 1

23 November 2019
11:00

Ghana	36-25	Botswana

Nduom Sports Stadium, Elmina

Elimination 2

23 November 2019	Ivory Coast	60-3	Rwanda	Bingerville Stadium, Abidjan
15:00	Try: Bakary Meite 5', 34'; Salif Toure 21'; Konan Aghien Nguessan 46'; Issa Bossono 58', 80'; Paul Diallo Dit Peres 64'; Mohamed Barro 73'; Con: Jonathan Lo (3/5) 22', 35', 59'; Douho Kouhon (1/2) 74'; Pen: Jonathan Lo (4/4) 12', 19', 26', 29'	WR Report	Pen: Moise Habumugisha 70'	Attendance: 3,500

Elimination 3

30 November 2019	Senegal	63-0	Mauritius	Stade Léopold Sédar Senghor, Dakar
	Try: Ousmane Ndiaye 20', 42'; Abdelkarim Fofana 24', 37'; Moussa Barry 29'; Mamadou Lamine Niang 32'; Ibrahima Thiaw 48'; Sagna Pape Alassane 69'; Mamadou Ndiaye 76'; Con: Mamadou Ndiaye (5/7) 21', 29', 33', 38', 49'; Sall Mansour (1/1) 70'; Ibrahima Diao (0/1); Pen: Sall Mansour (1/1) 5'; Mamadou Ndiaye (1/2) 28'; Cards: Antoine Laporte (red card) 59'	WR Report		Attendance: 1,000

Elimination 4

1 December 2019	Madagascar	63-3	Nigeria	Mahamasina Municipal Stadium, Antananarivo
	Try: Rija Rakotoarimanana 6'; Zhinot Hery 44', 59', 71'; Zo Randrianarisoa 46'; Herizo Rasoanaivo 53'; Tahina Ratsimandresy 56'; Tinelly Rabemananjara 66'; Fabrice Ramangalahy 80+1'; Con: Herizo Rasoanaivo (4/6) 7', 44', 47', 67'; Hery Rakotomanalina (1/2) 56'; Zo Randrianarisoa 80+2'; Pen: Herizo Rasoanaivo (2/4) 3', 15'	WR Report	Pen: Sulaiman Abdulganiyu 75'; Cards: Praise Rufus-Ashiedu (yellow card) 15'	Attendance: 30,000

== Group stage ==
The group stage will be held from June-July 2020

=== Group A ===
2019–20 Rugby Africa Gold Cup
Pos	Team	Pld	W	D	L	PF	PA	PD	BP	Pts
1	Namibia	0	0	0	0	0	0	0	0	0
2	Zambia	0	0	0	0	0	0	0	0	0
3	Madagascar	0	0	0	0	0	0	0	0	0

Namibia	Cancelled	Zambia

12 June 2020

Zambia	Cancelled	Madagascar

28 June 2020

Madagascar	Cancelled	Namibia

=== Group B ===
2019-2020 Rugby Africa Gold Cup

2019–20 Rugby Africa Gold Cup
Pos	Team	Pld	W	D	L	PF	PA	PD	BP	Pts
1	Kenya	0	0	0	0	0	0	0	0	0
2	Morocco	0	0	0	0	0	0	0	0	0
3	Ivory Coast	0	0	0	0	0	0	0	0	0

30 May 2020

Kenya	Cancelled	Morocco

13 June 2020

Morocco	Cancelled	Ivory Coast

27 June 2020

Ivory Coast	Cancelled	Kenya

=== Group C ===
2019–20 Rugby Africa Gold Cup
Pos	Team	Pld	W	D	L	PF	PA	PD	BP	Pts
1	Uganda	0	0	0	0	0	0	0	0	0
2	Algeria	0	0	0	0	0	0	0	0	0
3	Senegal	0	0	0	0	0	0	0	0	0

Uganda	Cancelled	Algeria

20 June 2020

Algeria	Cancelled	Senegal

4 July 2020

Senegal	Cancelled	Uganda

=== Group D ===
2019–20 Rugby Africa Gold Cup
Pos	Team	Pld	W	D	L	PF	PA	PD	BP	Pts
1	Tunisia	0	0	0	0	0	0	0	0	0
2	Zimbabwe	0	0	0	0	0	0	0	0	0
3	Ghana	0	0	0	0	0	0	0	0	0

Tunisia	Cancelled	Zimbabwe

20 June 2020

Zimbabwe	Cancelled	Ghana

4 July 2020

Ghana	Cancelled	Tunisia

== Knock-Out Stage ==
Semi-finals
Group A Winner
Group D Winner
Group B Winner
Group C Winner

Final
Third place play-off
