= 2011 Africa Cup =

11th Africa Cup
Tournament details
- Date: 12 June 2011– 12 November 2011
- Teams: 9

Final positions
- Champions: Kenya
- Runner-up: Tunisia

Tournament statistics
- Matches played: 11

The 2011 Africa Cup was the eleventh edition of this tournament. The competition has been restructured into several tiers, based on the IRB rankings.

The top sixteen teams played in Division 1, which is divided into four groups of four teams. The remaining teams played in Division 2.

== Group 1A ==
Group 1A will be held from 7–12 November in Kenya.

The teams competing in Group 1A:

- Kenya
- Morocco (withdrew)
- Namibia (withdrew)
- Tunisia

Place	Nation	Games				Points		Bonus	Table points
Place	Nation	played	won	drawn	lost	for	against	Bonus	Table points
1	Kenya	1	1	0	0	13	7	0	4
2	Tunisia	1	0	0	1	7	13	1	1
3	Morocco (substituted off)	0	0	0	0	0	0	0	0
3	Namibia (substituted off)	0	0	0	0	0	0	0	0

(substituted off) Morocco and Namibia relegated in division 1/B for 2012 Africa Cup

12 November 2011	Kenya	16 – 7	Tunisia	Nairobi

== Group 1B ==
Group 1B was held from 12 to 18 June in Uganda. The teams competing:

- Ivory Coast (withdrew)
- Madagascar
- Uganda
- Zimbabwe

Place	Nation	Games				Points		Bonus	Table points
Place	Nation	played	won	drawn	lost	for	against	Bonus	Table points
1	Zimbabwe (substituted on)	2	2	0	0	74	15	1	9
2	Uganda (substituted on)	2	1	0	1	73	55	1	5
3	Madagascar	2	0	0	2	30	107	0	0
3	Ivory Coast (substituted off)	0	0	0	0	0	0	0	0

(substituted on) Uganda and Zimbabwe promoted to pool A of 2012 Africa Cup

(substituted off) Ivory Coast relegated too poll C of 2012 Africa Cup

12 June 2001	Uganda	15 – 25	Zimbabwe	Kyadondo Rugby Grounds, Kampala
		Report

15 June 2006	Zimbabwe	49 – 0	Madagascar	Kyadondo Rugby Grounds, Kampala
		Report

18 June 2006	Uganda	58 – 30	Madagascar	Kyadondo Rugby Grounds, Kampala
		Report

== Group 1C ==
Group 1C was held from 21 to 25 June in Cameroon. The teams competing :

- Botswana
- Cameroon
- Senegal
- Zambia

Semi-Finals

21 June 2011	Senegal	30 – 12	Botswana	Yaoundé

21 June 2011	Cameroon	12 – 10	Zambia	Yaoundé

Third place play-off

25 June 2011	Zambia	17 – 12	Botswana	Yaoundé

Final

25 June 2011	Senegal	15 – 6	Cameroon	Yaoundé

- Senegal promoted to div. 1/B of 2012 Africa Cup

== Group 1D ==
Group 1D was held on 29 July in South Africa. The teams competing :

- Mauritius
- Nigeria
- Eswatini (withdrew and did not play any of its fixtures)
- Tanzania (withdrew and did not play any of its fixtures)

Place	Nation	Games				Points		Bonus	Table points
Place	Nation	played	won	drawn	lost	for	against	Bonus	Table points
1	Mauritius	1	1	0	0	41	12	1	5
2	Nigeria	1	0	0	1	12	41	0	0
3	Tanzania	0	0	0	0	0	0	0	0
3	Eswatini	0	0	0	0	0	0	0	0

2011-07-29	Mauritius	41 – 12	Nigeria	Johannesburg, South Africa

== Division 2 (North) ==
2011 Africa Cup North Zone
Tournament details
- Date: 17–24 June 2011
- Teams: 8

Final positions
- Champions: Mali
- Runner-up: Niger

Tournament statistics
- Matches played: 12

Division 2 (North) was held from 23 to 30 July in Mali.

The teams competing in Division 2 (North):

- Benin
- Burkina Faso
- Ghana
- Mali
- Mali A
- Niger
- Chad
- Togo

2011 Africa Cup Division 2 (North) Classification
Pos	Team
1	Mali
2	Niger
3	Burkina Faso
4	Ghana
5	Mali A
6	Benin
7	Chad
8	Togo
Mali were promoted to Group 1D.

- Quarter Finals

2011-07-23	Niger	30 – 3	Mali A	Bamako, Mali

2011-07-23	Mali	32 – 3	Chad	Bamako, Mali

2011-07-24	Ghana	16 – 7	Benin	Bamako, Mali

2011-07-24	Burkina Faso	11 – 6	Togo	Bamako, Mali

- Semi-Finals - 5th place-play-off

2011-07-26	Mali A	14 – 10	Togo	Bamako, Mali

2011-07-26	Chad	11 – 16	Benin	Nairobi, Kenya

- Semi-Finals

2011-07-27	Niger	12 – 5	Burkina Faso	Bamako, Mali

2011-07-27	Mali	28 – 3	Ghana	Nairobi, Kenya

- Seventh place play-off

2011-07-30	Togo	0 – 13	Chad	Bamako, Mali

- Fifth place play-off

2011-07-30	Mali A	3 – 0	Benin	Bamako, Mali

- Third place play-off

2011-07-30	Burkina Faso	15 – 3	Ghana	Bamako, Mali

- Final

2011-07-30	Niger	3 – 13	Mali	Bamako, Mali

== Division 2 (South) ==
2011 Africa Cup South Zone
Tournament details
- Date: 14 October 2011
- Teams: 2

Final positions
- Champions: Rwanda
- Runner-up: Burundi

Tournament statistics
- Matches played: 1

Division 2 (South) was held from 9–16 October in Rwanda.

The teams competing in Division 2 (South):

- Burundi
- DR Congo withdrew
- Réunion withdrew
- Rwanda

2011 Africa Cup Group 2 (South) Classification
Pos	Team
1	Rwanda
2	Burundi
3	DR Congo - withdrew
3	Réunion - withdrew
Rwanda were promoted to Group 1D.

2011-10-14	Rwanda	22 – 3	Burundi	Kigali, Rwanda

== See also ==
- Africa Cup
