= 2001 Africa Cup =

2nd Africa Cup
- Date: 17 March 2001 – 10 November 2001
- Countries: Ivory Coast; Morocco; Namibia; South Africa Amateurs; Tunisia; Zimbabwe

Final positions
- Champions: South Africa Amateurs
- Runner-up: Morocco

Tournament statistics
- Matches played: 13

The 2001 Africa Cup (officially called at that time "Africa Top Six") was the second edition of the highest-level rugby union tournament in Africa. Six teams participated (South Africa with an under-23 amateurs team). The teams were divided in two pools played on a home-away basis.

== Division 1 (Africa Cup) ==
=== Regional pools ===
==== Pool South ====
Place	Nation	Games				Points			Table points
Place	Nation	played	won	drawn	lost	for	against	difference	Table points
1	South Africa Amateurs	4	4	0	0	250	77	+173	8
2	Namibia	4	1	0	2	73	143	-111	7
3	Zimbabwe	4	1	0	2	91	194	-103	2

26 May 2001

Namibia	15 – 60	South Africa Amateurs

Windhoek

2 June 2001

Zimbabwe	20 – 71	South Africa Amateurs

Bulawayo

16 June 2001

South Africa Amateurs	41 – 13	Namibia

Johannesburg

23 June 2001

South Africa Amateurs	78 – 29	Zimbabwe

Durban

7 July 2001

Zimbabwe	27 – 26	Namibia

Harare

14 July 2001

Namibia	19 – 15	Zimbabwe

Windhoek

==== Pool North ====
Place	Nation	Games				Points			Table points
Place	Nation	played	won	drawn	lost	for	against	difference	Table points
1	Morocco	4	4	0	0	85	46	+39	8
2	Ivory Coast	4	1	1	2	86	49	+37	4
3	Tunisia	4	0	1	3	28	104	-76	0

17 March 2001

Tunisia	14 – 17	Morocco

Tunis

7 April 2001

Ivory Coast	11 – 18	Morocco

Abidjan

21 April 2001

Morocco	20 – 18	Ivory Coast

Fes

28 April 2001

Tunisia	11 – 11	Ivory Coast

Tunis

12 May 2001

Ivory Coast	46 – 0	Tunisia

Abidjan

19 May 2001

Morocco	30 – 3	Tunisia

Marrakesh

=== Final ===
10 November 2001

Morocco	20 – 36	South Africa Amateurs

Casablanca

== Division 2 ==
This tournament serve too with the Division 1 for the 2003 Rugby World Cup qualifying.

=== Round 1 ===
Kenya exempted from the Round 1.

==== Pool A ====
Place	Nation	Games				Points			Table points
Place	Nation	played	won	drawn	lost	for	against	difference	Table points
1	Cameroon	2	1	0	1	41	25	+16	4
2	Uganda	2	1	0	1	21	29	-8	4
3	Zambia	2	1	0	1	37	45	-8	4

28 July 2001

Zambia	25 – 24	Cameroon

Chingola

11 August 2001

Uganda	21 – 12	Zambia

Kampala

25 August 2001

Cameroon	17 – 0	Uganda

Douala

==== Pool B ====
Place	Nation	Games				Points			Table points
Place	Nation	played	won	drawn	lost	for	against	difference	Table points
1	Madagascar	2	2	0	0	57	32	+25	6
2	Botswana	2	1	0	1	24	34	-10	4
3	Swaziland	2	0	0	2	24	39	-15	2

1 September 2001

Botswana	13 – 3	Swaziland

Gaborone

16 September 2001

Madagascar	31 – 11	Botswana

Antananarivo

29 September 2001

Swaziland	21 – 26	Madagascar

Malkerns

=== Round 2 ===
Place	Nation	Games				Points			Table points
Place	Nation	played	won	drawn	lost	for	against	difference	Table points
1	Madagascar	2	2	0	0	57	44	+13	6
2	Kenya	2	1	0	1	60	42	+18	4
3	Cameroon	2	0	0	2	39	70	-31	2

13 October 2001

Madagascar	27 – 20	Kenya

Antananarivo

27 October 2001

Cameroon	24 – 30	Madagascar

Yaoundé

24 November 2001

Kenya	40 – 15	Cameroon

Nairobi
