= 2002 Africa Cup =

Rugby union tournament

3rd Africa Cup
- Date: 18 May 2002– 10 November 2002
- Countries: Ivory Coast; Madagascar; Morocco; Namibia; Tunisia; Zimbabwe

Final positions
- Champions: Namibia
- Runner-up: Tunisia

Tournament statistics
- Matches played: 8

The 2002 Africa Cup (officially called "Africa Top Six" at the time) was the third edition of the Africa Cup, the highest level rugby union tournament in Africa. The tournament also served as the final round of African qualification for 2003 Rugby World Cup.

Six teams participated. The teams were divided in two pools, north and south, with a final between the winner of each pool.

A second division was also played.

== Division 1 (Africa Cup) ==
=== Regional pools ===
==== Pool South ====
Place	Nation	Games				Points			Table points
Place	Nation	played	won	drawn	lost	for	against	difference	Table points
1	Namibia	2	2	0	0	158	30	-128	4
2	Madagascar	2	1	0	1	52	119	-66	2
3	Zimbabwe	2	0	0	2	33	94	-61	0

2 June 2002

Madagascar	3 – 52	Zimbabwe

Antananarivo

15 June 2002

Namibia	116 – 0	Madagascar

Windhoek

29 June 2002

Zimbabwe	30 – 42	Namibia

Harare

==== Pool North ====
Place	Nation	Games				Points			Table points
Place	Nation	played	won	drawn	lost	for	against	difference	Table points
1	Tunisia	2	2	0	0	40	34	+6	4
2	Morocco	2	1	0	1	49	48	+1	2
2	Ivory Coast	2	0	0	2	29	36	-7	0

18 May 2002

Tunisia	27 – 26	Morocco

Tunis

25 May 2002

Ivory Coast	8 – 13	Tunisia

Abidjan

1 June 2002

Morocco	23 – 21	Ivory Coast

Casablanca

=== Finals ===
28 September 2002

Namibia	26 – 19	Tunisia

Windhoek

12 October 2002

Tunisia	24 – 17	Namibia

Tunis

The aggregate results was drawn 33-33. Namibia won thanks the number of tries scored.

== Division 2 ==
The 2002 Africa Cup second division was the second edition of lower level rugby union tournament in Africa. The teams were divided in two pools, with a final between the winner of each pool.

=== Pool North ===
Place	Nation	Games				Points			Table points
Place	Nation	played	won	drawn	lost	for	against	difference	Table points
1	Uganda	2	2	0	0	56	35	+21	4
2	Kenya	2	1	0	1	40	44	-4	2
3	Cameroon	2	0	0	2	26	43	-17	0

7 September 2002

Uganda	25 - 13	Cameroon

Kampala

21 September 2002

Cameroon	13 - 18	Kenya

Douala

5 October 2002

Kenya	22 - 31	Uganda

Nairobi

=== Pool South ===
Place	Nation	Games				Points			Table points
Place	Nation	played	won	drawn	lost	for	against	difference	Table points
1	Botswana	2	1	1	0	42	19	+23	3
2	Zambia	2	1	0	1	80	41	+39	2
3	Eswatini	2	0	1	1	19	71	-52	0

27 July 2002

Botswana	32 - 19	Zambia

Lusaka

21 September 2002

Zambia	61 - 9	Eswatini

5 October 2002

Eswatini	10 - 10	Botswana

=== Final ===
16 November 2002

Uganda	56 - 7	Botswana

Kampala

== See also ==
- 2003 Rugby World Cup – Africa qualification

== References and notes ==
"2002 International Rugby Results". Rugby International.
