= Allister Coetzee =

South African rugby union player

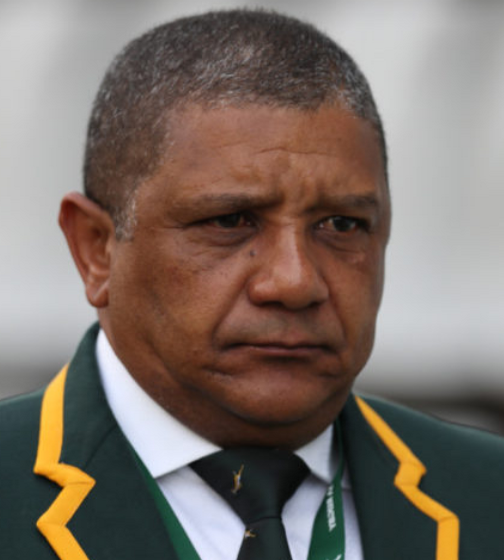
- Born: 23 May 1963 (age 63) Grahamstown, Cape Province
- School: Mary Waters Secondary School
- University: Dower College
- Notable relative: Kevin Luiters (nephew)

Rugby union career
- Position: Scrum-half
- Current team: South Africa
Senior career
| Years | Team | Apps | (Points) |
| 1985–1991 | SARU | | |
| 1992–1996 | Eastern Province | | |
Coaching career
- Years: Team
- 1996–1997: Eastern Province (assistant)
- 1998: Emerging Springboks
- 1999: Vodacom All-Stars
- 2000: Sharks (assistant)
- 2000: South Africa U23
- 2000: South Africa (assistant)
- 2000: South Africa 'A'
- 2001–2003: Mighty Elephants
- 2004–2007: South Africa (assistant)
- 2005–2006: Cats (backline coach)
- 2008–2009: Stormers (backline coach)
- 2008–2015: Western Province
- 2010–2015: Stormers
- 2015–2016: Kobelco Steelers
- 2016–2018: South Africa
- 2018–2020: Canon Eagles
- 2021–2022: Rugby Rovigo
- 2021–2024: Namibia
- 2024: Namibia under-20
- 2024–: Eastern Province Elephants

Allister Coetzee (born 23 May 1963) is a South African rugby union coach and former player. He currently coaches the Eastern Province Elephants, having previously overseen the Namibian and South African national sides.

== Personal ==
Coetzee is the uncle of Kevin Luiters, a scrum-half with the Eastern Province Kings.

== Playing career ==
Coetzee has been involved with rugby since 1974 – he spent 22 years as a player before retiring at the age of 33 in 1996.

Prior to the unification of different rugby union governing bodies in South Africa, he represented SARU, playing as a scrum-half, between 1985 and 1991 and was captain of their side between 1988 and 1991. He was a Junior Springbok in 1992 and played Currie Cup rugby for Eastern Province between 1992 and 1996. He was selected for their squad that competed in the 1994 Super 10 Rugby, though his side failed to secure a single win in the competition.

During his playing career, he was also a teacher at Gelvan Park Primary School in Port Elizabeth, where he worked for fifteen years. He played as a scrum-half and retired at the end of 1996.

== Coaching career ==
=== Early years ===
Immediately after retiring, Coetzee joined the coaching team at his former club as an assistant, however, his side finished bottom of the 1997 Currie Cup table. In 1998, he was appointed team manager at Super 12 side the Sharks, where he later became an assistant coach in 2000. However, after the Sharks finished bottom of the table, the coaching team, who had only been in place for a year, was sacked by the club.

In 1998 he earned his first Union appointed coaching role when he coached the Emerging Springboks and a Vodacom All-Stars team in 1999. In 2000 he took a South African Under-23 team, sometimes known as South Africa Amateurs, to the 2000 Africa Cup, competing against the national senior sides of Namibia and Zimbabwe. He convincingly led the side to top of the South Pool with four from four wins, to earn the right to compete in the final later in the year. However, Coetzee was later called up to the South African senior side's coaching team by Harry Viljoen for their end of year tour, and missed the final against Morocco - Ian Hattingh led the team as Coetzee's replacement. Under Viljoen, South Africa won three from four wins on their end of year tour, while Coetzee led South Africa 'A' in their mid-weeks matches while on tour.

=== 2001–2008 ===
In 2001, he became head coach of the Mighty Elephants, becoming the first coloured head coach of a provincial side. He remained head coach in Port Elizabeth until he resigned in July 2003, haven failed to improve the side in either the Currie Cup or Bankfin Cup. He became a selector for the national team at the end of 2003 season, after Rudolf Straeuli stood down after being knocked-out at the quarter-finals of the 2003 Rugby World Cup.

Jake White was appointed as Straeuli's replacement, and appointed Allister as assistant and backline coach in 2004, where he remained until 2007. He was on the coaching staff of the side that won the 2007 Rugby World Cup.

In 2005, he took up a dual-coaching role when he was appointed backline coach for the Cats ahead of the 2006 Super 14 season.

Following the end of Jake White's tenure at the Springboks, Coetzee was one of the four main candidates to take over as head coach. However, after losing out to Peter de Villiers, he accepted an offer to become backline coach of the Stormers. He also took over as head coach of Western Province later in 2008, following Gary Gold's decision to become an assistant coach with the Springboks. In his second year in charge of Western Province, the side returned to the knock out stage for the first time in 3 years, however was defeated by the Blue Bulls 21–19.

=== Stormers head coach ===
Following a poor 2009 Super 14 season, Coetzee was appointed head coach of the Stormers for the 2010 Super 14 season. In just his first season in charge, the Stormers jumped from their 10th-place finish in 2009 to second in the 2010. This was the first time since the 2004 Super 12 season that the Stormers had made the knock out phase of the tournament, and after defeating the New South Wales Waratahs 25–6 in the Semi-finals, this side became the first Stormers to make the final. However they were later beaten by the Bulls 25–17. He also led Western Province to their first Currie Cup final since 2001, finished second behind the Sharks, being beaten 30–10 in the final.

In 2011 and 2012, the Stormers finished as the top South African team during the 2011 and 2012 Super Rugby season's, but was knocked out by the Crusaders, 29–10, in the semi-final in 2011 and the Sharks, 26–19, at the same stage in 2012. In 2013, the Stormers narrowly missed out on the knock out stage, finishing in 7th place on the overall table, but returned to that stage in 2015. However, this time, they were knocked out in the qualifiers round, by the Brumbies 39–19. This was Coetzee's last game in charge of the Cape Town franchise, announcing in early 2015 he would be stepping down from his role at the Stormers and Western Province at the end of the season. He left the side with a 65.5% win rate, 61 wins from 93.

During his time at Western Province, he led the side to four consecutive Currie Cup finals between 2012 and 2015, winning the title in 2012 and 2014.

=== Coaching in Japan ===
In October 2015, he joined his Japan based side Kobelco Steelers, where Coetzee led his new side to victory of the Pre-season competition. In his first and only season at the club, Kobelco Steelers finished second in their pool during the 2015–16 Top League. He guided them to the semi-finals, with victory over Kintetsu Liners 42–10 in the quarter-finals, but was defeated by the eventual champions Panasonic Wild Knights by the same scoreline in the semi's.

=== Head coach of South Africa ===
On 12 April 2016, he was appointed as the head coach of the South African national team. His first game in charge was a first ever home defeat to Ireland, 26–20, during the two sides three-test series. This defeat came despite South Africa being 1-man up for close to 60 minutes of the game, when Ireland's CJ Stander was red-carded. However, the series was all level after the second test, when South Africa came from behind at half time, 19–3, to win 32–26, and with a third test victory, 19–13, Coetzee led the Sprinboks to a narrow 2–1 series win.

In his first Rugby Championship, he led the team to a third-place finish, 5 points clear of bottom-placed Argentina. He guided his side to a 30–23 win over the Pumas, before losing to Argentina 26–24 for the first time. The Springboks then went on to back-to-back losses to Australia, 23–17, and New Zealand, 41–13, before gaining their second win in the Championship against Australia 18–10 in Pretoria. In the final round of the Championship, New Zealand defeated South Africa 57–15 in Durban, a record win for the All Blacks on South African soil. Following that loss, the SARU organised a debrief between the Springboks coaching staff and all the Super Rugby franchise' managements. It was later revealed that Coetzee had recruited specialist coaches ahead of their 2016 end-of-year tour, including a skills, defence and kicking coach. During their end-of-year tour, Coetzee led the Springboks to a win less tour for the first time since their 2002 tour. They did however draw against the Barbarians 31–all in an uncapped match, before going on to lose to England for the first time in 10 years, 37–21. They later lost to Italy for the first time, 20–18, and a record loss to Wales 27–13, saw South Africa drop to equal worst World Ranking of 6th.

In February 2017, the South African Rugby Union reviewed the Springboks 2016 campaign and the performances of the head coach Allister Coetzee. His job was deemed under threat due to the poor season, however the SARU backed Coetzee and it was announced that he will remain as the Springboks coach. Coetzee brought in new coaches around him to form a new coaching staff and management in a bid to have a more successful season. His first campaign under the new management was a three-test series against France. Eight uncapped players were named in the series squad, with five of them gaining their first cap in the opening test - four in the run-on XV. The first test was won convincingly 37–14, which was backed up by a 37–15 in the second test to seal the series. The final test was played at Ellis Park Stadium in Johannesburg, a venue in which South Africa has never beaten France in four attempts. However this time, South Africa saw out the victory, winning 35–15 to win the series 3–0. South Africa started the 2017 Rugby Championship promising with back-to-back wins over Argentina, 37–15 (home) and 41–23 (away). The third saw South Africa draw with Australia, for the first time since 2001, 23–23. The result was repeated in the reverse fixture three weeks later, when it ended 27–27. In the fourth round, South Africa suffered their largest defeat in 111 years, losing to the All Blacks in Albany 57–0, surpassing the previous worst defeat against England 53–3 in 2002. They turned this defeat around, and put in a better performance in against the All Blacks in South Africa, narrowly losing the game 25–24 in Cape Town. Despite a promising end to the Springboks's Rugby Championship campaign, South Africa went on to have a record defeat to Ireland, losing 38–3, before going onto narrowly defeating France 18–17. Their only other victory during their European tour was a 35–6 win over Italy, before going to on to lose for the second year running to Wales, 24–22.

On 2 February 2018, he was sacked by the South African Rugby Union following a run of poor results across his two-year tenure.

==== International matches as head coach ====
Note: World Rankings Column shows the World Ranking South Africa was placed at on the following Monday after each of their matches

Matches (2016–2018)
| Matches | Date | Opposition | Venue | Score (SA–Opponent) | Competition | Captain | World Ranking |
2016
| 1 | 11 June | Ireland | Newlands, Cape Town | 20–26 | Ireland test series | Adriaan Strauss | 4th |
| 2 | 18 June | Ireland | Ellis Park Stadium, Johannesburg | 32–26 | Ireland test series | Adriaan Strauss | 3rd |
| 3 | 25 June | Ireland | Nelson Mandela Bay Stadium, Port Elizabeth | 19–13 | Ireland test series | Adriaan Strauss | 3rd |
| 4 | 20 August | Argentina | Mbombela Stadium, Nelspruit | 30–23 | Rugby Championship | Adriaan Strauss | 3rd |
| 5 | 27 August | Argentina | Estadio Padre Ernesto Martearena, Salta | 24–26 | Rugby Championship | Adriaan Strauss | 3rd |
| 6 | 10 September | Australia | Suncorp Stadium, Brisbane | 17–23 | Rugby Championship | Adriaan Strauss | 4th |
| 7 | 17 September | New Zealand | AMI Stadium, Christchurch | 13–41 | Rugby Championship | Adriaan Strauss | 4th |
| 8 | 1 October | Australia | Loftus Versfeld Stadium, Pretoria | 18–10 | Rugby Championship | Adriaan Strauss | 3rd |
| 9 | 8 October | New Zealand | Kings Park Stadium, Durban | 15–57 | Rugby Championship | Adriaan Strauss | 4th |
| 10 | 12 November | England | Twickenham Stadium, London | 21–37 | End-of-year tour | Adriaan Strauss | 4th |
| 11 | 19 November | Italy | Stadio Olimpico, Rome | 18–20 | End-of-year tour | Adriaan Strauss | 5th |
| 12 | 26 November | Wales | Millennium Stadium, Cardiff | 13–27 | End-of-year tour | Adriaan Strauss | 6th |
2017
| 13 | 10 June | France | Loftus Versfeld Stadium, Pretoria | 37–14 | France test series | Warren Whiteley | 5th |
| 14 | 17 June | France | Kings Park Stadium, Durban | 37–15 | France test series | Warren Whiteley | 6th |
| 15 | 24 June | France | Ellis Park Stadium, Johannesburg | 35–12 | France test series | Eben Etzebeth | 5th |
| 16 | 19 August | Argentina | Nelson Mandela Bay Stadium, Port Elizabeth | 37–15 | Rugby Championship | Eben Etzebeth | 4th |
| 17 | 26 August | Argentina | Estadio Padre Ernesto Martearena, Salta | 41–23 | Rugby Championship | Eben Etzebeth | 3rd |
| 18 | 9 September | Australia | nib Stadium, Perth | 23–23 | Rugby Championship | Eben Etzebeth | 3rd |
| 19 | 16 September | New Zealand | QBE Stadium, Albany | 0–57 | Rugby Championship | Eben Etzebeth | 3rd |
| 20 | 30 September | Australia | Toyota Stadium, Bloemfontein | 27–27 | Rugby Championship | Eben Etzebeth | 4th |
| 21 | 7 October | New Zealand | DHL Newlands, Cape Town | 24–25 | Rugby Championship | Eben Etzebeth | 5th |
| 22 | 11 November | Ireland | Aviva Stadium, Dublin | 3–38 | End-of-year tour | Eben Etzebeth | 5th |
| 23 | 18 November | France | Stade de France, Saint-Denis | 18–17 | End-of-year tour | Eben Etzebeth | 5th |
| 24 | 25 November | Italy | Stadio Euganeo, Padua | 35–6 | End-of-year tour | Eben Etzebeth | 5th |
| 25 | 2 December | Wales | Millennium Stadium, Cardiff | 22–24 | End-of-year tour | Eben Etzebeth | |

=== Post South Africa ===
Following his departure for the Springboks, Coetzee was appointed as head coach of the Canon Eagles in Japan ahead of the 2018–19 Top League season. This came just a month after being sacked by the South African Rugby Union.

Under Coetzee, the Eagles finished twelfth in the 16-team competition in the 2018/2019 season and then in ninth place before the 2019/2020 season was cancelled due to the COVID-19 pandemic. By April 2020, during the height of the pandemic, Canon Eagles confirmed that the club and Coetzee would part ways.

In May 2021, Coetzee then returned to coaching, taking on the role of head coach for Italian semi-pro outfit Rovigo Delta, who at the time were the reigning champions of the Top10 competition in Italy.

In his first season in charge, he returned his side to the final to retain the Top10 title (which would be the first back-to-back title), only to lose to Petrarca 19–6.

Coetzee later left his role three months into the new season, denaturing in November 2022 due to personal reasons.

=== Head coach of Namibia ===
In June 2021, Coetzee returned to International coaching, replacing Johan Diergaardt as the Head Coach of Namibia - a role that he would perform alongside his coaching duties at Rovigo Delta.

Coetzee's appointment came with the remit to earn qualification for the 2023 Rugby World Cup, and his first match came on 3 July 2021 against Ivory Coast, Namibia's first match since the 2019 Rugby World Cup, during the RWC 2023 African qualification process. Despite losing that game 24–13, Namibia secured top spot in the first round of the qualification process to see them through to the 2022 Africa Cup, the final stage of Qualification for Africa.

In November he helped Namibia win the Stellenbosch Challenge Cup, defeating Kenya and Zimbabwe in a two-round format competition held in South Africa.

In July 2022, Namibia secured qualification for the Rugby World Cup, and later in the year, defeated Canada for the first time, winning 43–37.

During the 2023 Rugby World Cup, Namibia lost all of the games in the group stage, including two record losses to Italy and hosts and France.

In 2024, Coetzee also led the Namibia U20 side to create a better alignment for playing coming through the system.

In the 2024 Rugby Africa Cup, Coetzee led nine-time champions Namibia to a 32–10 defeat against Zimbabwe in the semifinals, their first defeat to their southern African rivals in 23 years.

In November 2024, the Namibian rugby union restructured the coaching set-up, which saw Coetzee replaced by Jacques Burger as Director of Rugby, and Chrysander Botha as head coach. As a result, Coetzee returned to South African and became head coach of the Eastern Province Elephants.

== Coaching honours ==
Namibia

- Stellenbosch Challenge Cup
  - Winners: 2021
- Africa Cup
  - Winners: 2022

South Africa (as assistant coach)

- IRB Team of the Year (South Africa)
  - Winners: 2004, 2007
- Rugby World Cup / Webb Ellis Cup
  - Winners: 2007
- Tri Nations
  - Winners: 2004
  - Runners-up: 2005
- Freedom Cup
  - Winners: 2004
- Mandela Challenge Plate
  - Winners: 2005
- Prince William Cup
  - Winners: 2007

South Africa U23

- Africa Cup
  - Winners: 2000

Mighty Elephants

- Vodacom Cup
  - Shield: 2002

Stormers (as head coach)

- Super 14
  - Runners-up: 2010

Western Province

- Currie Cup
  - Winners: 2012, 2014
  - Runners-up: 2010, 2013, 2015

Sporting positions
| Preceded by (South Africa) Heyneke Meyer | South Africa National Rugby Union Coach; 2016–2018 | Succeeded by (South Africa) Rassie Erasmus |
| Preceded by (Namibia) Johan Diergaardt | Namibia National Rugby Union Coach; 2021–2024 | Succeeded by (Namibia) Chrysander Botha |
