= 2005 Africa Cup =

International rugby competition

6th Africa Cup (CAR championship)
Tournament details
- Host: Morocco
- Date: 3 September 2005 – 9 November 2005
- Countries: Kenya; Ivory Coast; Madagascar; Morocco; Namibia; South Africa Amateurs; Tunisia; Uganda; Zimbabwe

Final positions
- Champions: Morocco
- Runner-up: Madagascar

Tournament statistics
- Matches played: 12

The 2005 Africa Cup (official name "Top 9") was the 6th edition of the continental rugby union tournament arranged by the Confederation of African Rugby (CAR).

It was won by Morocco, who defeated Madagascar in the final.

The final was played at the Stade de France before the match between France and South Africa match of the 2005 South Africa rugby union tour of Argentina and Europe. The match was arranged in that venue, due to participation of South African Amateurs selection, who were surprisingly defeated in the semifinal by Madagascar.

== Division 1 (Africa Cup) ==
=== First round ===
==== Pool A ====
3 September 2005

Uganda	5 – 13	Zimbabwe

Kampala

17 September 2005

Zimbabwe	29 – 47	South Africa Amateurs

Harare

1 October 2005

South Africa Amateurs	98 – 10	Uganda

Johannesburg

Three points for a victory, two for a draw, and one for a loss

Team	Played	Won	Drawn	Lost	For	Against	Difference	Pts
South Africa Amateurs	2	2	0	0	145	39	+ 106	6
Zimbabwe	2	1	0	1	42	52	10	4
Uganda	2	0	0	2	15	111	96	2

==== Pool B ====
3 September 2005

Namibia	6 – 0	Ivory Coast

FORFAIT

17 September 2005

Madagascar	30 – 10	Ivory Coast

Antananarivo

1 October 2005

Namibia	55 – 17	Madagascar

Windhoek

Three points for a victory, two for a draw, and one for a loss

Team	Played	Won	Drawn	Lost	For	Against	Difference	Pts
Namibia	2	2	0	0	61	17	+ 44	6
Madagascar	2	1	0	1	47	65	18	4
Ivory Coast	1	0	0	1	10	36	26	1

==== Pool C ====
23 April 2005

Tunisia	3 – 10	Morocco

Tunis

7 May 2005

Morocco	19 – 3	Kenya

Casablanca

21 May 2005

Kenya	37 – 15	Tunisia

Nairobi

Three points for a victory, two for a draw, and one for a loss

Team	Played	Won	Drawn	Lost	For	Against	Difference	Pts
Morocco	2	2	0	0	29	6	+ 23	6
Kenya	2	1	0	1	40	34	+6	4
Tunisia	2	0	0	2	18	27	29	2

=== Knockout stage ===
==== Semifinals ====
5 November 2005

South Africa Amateurs	31 – 33	Madagascar

Johannesburg

5 November 2005

Morocco	49 – 0	Namibia

Casablanca

==== Final ====
26 November 2005

Morocco	43 – 6	Madagascar

Stade de France, Saint-Denis
