= 2006 Africa Cup =

7th Africa Cup
- Date: 8 April 2006 – 2 December 2006
- Countries: Cameroon; Ivory Coast; Kenya; Madagascar; Morocco; Namibia; Senegal; South Africa Amateurs; Tunisia; Uganda; Zambia; Zimbabwe

Final positions
- Champions: South Africa Amateurs
- Runner-up: Namibia

Tournament statistics
- Matches played: 21

The 2006 Africa Cup was the seventh edition of highest level rugby union tournament in Africa. In this edition, the tournament expanded from nine nations to twelve leading to a change in the format of the tournament which now includes four pools of three teams. Results from Pool 1 & 2 also counted for the 2007 Rugby World Cup qualifying.

== Division 1 (Africa Cup) ==
=== Pool Stage ===
Pool 1 & 2 were played on home and away basis as they also counted for Round 2 of 2007 Rugby World Cup qualifying. Pool winners qualify for the semi-finals.

==== Pool 1 ====
Place	Nation	Games				Points			Table points
Place	Nation	played	won	drawn	lost	for	against	difference	Table points
1	Namibia	4	2	0	2	140	81	+59	8
2	Tunisia	4	2	0	2	91	67	+24	8
3	Kenya	4	2	0	2	79	162	-83	8

27 May 2006

Namibia	84 – 12	Kenya

Windhoek

10 June 2006

Kenya	25 – 21	Tunisia

Nairobi

1 July 2006

Tunisia	24 – 7	Namibia

Tunis

2 September 2006

Kenya	30 – 26	Namibia

Nairobi

16 September 2006

Tunisia	31 – 12	Kenya

Tunis

7 October 2006

Namibia	23 – 15	Tunisia

Windhoek

==== Pool 2 ====
Place	Nation	Games				Points			Table points
Place	Nation	played	won	drawn	lost	for	against	difference	Table points
1	Morocco	4	3	1	0	73	22	+51	11
2	Ivory Coast	4	1	1	2	41	73	-32	7
3	Uganda	4	1	0	3	47	66	-19	6

3 June 2006

Morocco	36 – 3	Uganda

Casablanca

17 June 2006

Ivory Coast	9 – 9	Morocco

Abidjan

1 July 2006

Uganda	32 – 7	Ivory Coast

Kampala

2 September 2006

Uganda	3 – 5	Morocco

Kampala

16 September 2006

Ivory Coast	18 – 9	Uganda

Abidjan

7 October 2006

Morocco	23 – 7	Ivory Coast

Casablanca

==== Pool 3 ====
Place	Nation	Games				Points			Table points
Place	Nation	played	won	drawn	lost	for	against	difference	Table points
1	South Africa Amateurs	2	2	0	0	114	14	+100	6
2	Senegal	2	1	0	1	25	100	-75	4
3	Cameroon	2	0	0	2	25	50	-25	2

8 April 2006

Senegal	20 – 16	Cameroon

Dakar

10 June 2006

South Africa Amateurs	84 – 5	Senegal

Durban

1 July 2006

Cameroon	9 – 30	South Africa Amateurs

Douala

==== Pool 4 ====
Place	Nation	Games				Points			Table points
Place	Nation	played	won	drawn	lost	for	against	difference	Table points
1	Madagascar	2	1	1	0	81	40	+41	5
2	Zambia	2	1	0	1	32	69	-37	4
3	Zimbabwe	2	0	1	1	32	36	-4	2

12 August 2006

Zimbabwe	22 – 22	Madagascar

Harare

26 August 2006

Madagascar	59 – 18	Zambia

Antananarivo

16 September 2006

Zambia	14 – 10	Zimbabwe

Lusaka

=== Knockout stage ===
==== Semi-finals ====
Second semi-final on home and away because of the 2007 Rugby World Cup qualifying.

7 October 2006

South Africa Amateurs	48 – 6	Madagascar

Johannesburg

South Africa qualified to final.

28 October 2006

Namibia	25 – 7	Morocco

Windhoek

11 November 2006

Morocco	8 – 27	Namibia

Casablanca

Namibia qualified to final e to 2007 Rugby World Cup.

==== Final ====
2 December 2006

Namibia	27 – 29	South Africa Amateurs

Windhoek
