= 1991 Rugby World Cup – Africa qualification =

The 1991 Rugby World Cup – Africa qualification was a qualifying tournament for the 1991 Rugby World Cup which was jointly hosted by England, France, Ireland, Scotland and Wales. The Confederation of African Rugby was allocated one place (Africa 1) and a tournament took place in Zimbabwe, which was won by the home team.

== Format ==
In May 1991 four nations played in a round-robin tournament with each nation playing their opponents once and every nation playing three times.

The points system was as follows:

- 3 points for a win
- 2 points for a draw
- 1 point for playing

All six matches were played at the Police Ground, Harare, Zimbabwe.

== Overview ==
Final standings

Team	Played	Won	Drawn	Lost	For	Against	Difference	Points
Zimbabwe	3	3	0	0	62	22	+40	9
Tunisia	3	2	0	1	41	43	−2	7
Morocco	3	1	0	2	23	36	−13	5
Ivory Coast	3	0	0	3	20	45	−25	3

5 May 1990

Zimbabwe	22 – 9	Ivory Coast

Police Ground, Harare

5 May 1990

Morocco	12 – 16	Tunisia

Police Ground, Harare

8 May 1990

Zimbabwe	16 – 0	Morocco

Police Ground, Harare

8 May 1990

Ivory Coast	7 – 12	Tunisia

Police Ground, Harare

12 May 1990

Zimbabwe	24 – 13	Tunisia

Police Ground, Harare

12 May 1990

Ivory Coast	4 – 11	Morocco

Police Ground, Harare

Zimbabwe qualified to 1991 Rugby World Cup, Pool 2.
