= Rugby Africa Cup =

Two-year men's rugby union tournament

- Current season or competition: 2025 Rugby Africa Cup
- Sport: Rugby union
- Instituted: 2000
- Governing body: Africa (Rugby Africa)
- Holders: Zimbabwe (2025)
- Most titles: Namibia (9 titles)
- Website: Rugby Africa Cup

The Rugby Africa Cup is a two-year men's rugby union tournament involving the top 16 African nations based on their World Rugby rankings, it is organised by Rugby Africa. The tournament was first held in 2000. It was renamed the Rugby Africa Cup in November 2019, it was previously called the Africa Cup since 2006, the CAR Top 9 and CAR Top 10.

Due to South Africa being far stronger than any other African nation, South African teams have only competed five times, and won the competition three times. The winning South African teams on these occasions were the under 23 or amateur players (in 2000, 2001 and 2006).

== History ==
The African Cup of Rugby Union took place for the first time in 2000, with five teams taking part in the event, Morocco, Tunisia, Namibia, Zimbabwe and the hosts South Africa, the winner of the competition. In 2004, a second division called CAR Development Trophy and now named now African Development Trophy was formed, reserved for U19 national teams. In 2006, the Africa Cup was coupled with the Rugby World Cup qualification, the winner qualified for the Rugby World Cup. In 2011, a Division 1A was created and in 2014, the division took place as a four-team championship.

The winner of the 2022 Africa Gold Cup qualified for the 2023 Rugby World Cup and the runner-up qualified for its final qualification tournament in November 2022.

== Structure ==
The tournament was revamped in November 2019, this time the top 16 nations, based on their World Rugby rankings prior to the competition, will compete over a two-year period. According to their website Rugby Africa explained the tournament as follows:

The first stage consists of a qualifying round: the teams ranked 9th, 10th, 11th and 12th will oppose the teams ranked 13th, 14th, 15th and 16th, respectively, in a single match at home. The winner of each of these four matches will progress to the group phase. In this second stage, the 12 teams are divided into 4 pools; inside each pool the 3 teams play against each other in a home or away game. The winner of each group will progress to the final tournament of the RAC. The top four teams from Africa will meet in one venue for the final stage of the RAC, which will include two semi-finals, a play-off for third place and, ultimately, the final to decide who will be the African champions.

The 2019–20 Rugby Africa Cup was the first tournament after the restructuring, but was cancelled in 2020 due to the COVID-19 pandemic. The 2021–22 Rugby Africa Cup will double as a 2023 Rugby World Cup qualifier for Africa.

In addition to the main fifteens tournaments, an Under-20 competition featuring eight teams was held in April and a rugby sevens tournament involving twelve teams was held in November. A women's rugby sevens tournament is also to be scheduled.

== Summary ==
Below is a list of previous tournaments and final results:

Year	Host	Final			Third place match		
Year	Host	Winner	Score	Runner-up	Third	Score	Fourth
Africa Cup
2000	Casablanca, Morocco	South Africa Amateurs	44–14	Morocco	No third place		
2001	Casablanca, Morocco	South Africa Amateurs	36–20	Morocco	No third place		
2002	Windhoek, Namibia	Namibia^{1}	26–19	Tunisia	No third place		
2002	Tunis, Tunisia	Namibia^{1}	17–24	Tunisia	No third place		
2003	Casablanca, Morocco	Morocco	27–7	Namibia	Madagascar and Uganda		
2004	Windhoek, Namibia	Namibia	39–22	Morocco	No third place		
2005	Paris, France	Morocco	43–6	Madagascar	Namibia and South Africa Amateurs		
2006	Windhoek, Namibia	South Africa Amateurs	29–27	Namibia	Madagascar and Morocco		
2007	Antananarivo, Madagascar	Uganda	42–11	Madagascar	Kenya	20–17	Ivory Coast
2008–09	Tunis, Tunisia	Namibia^{2}	18–13	Tunisia	Ivory Coast and Uganda		
2008–09	Windhoek, Namibia	Namibia^{2}	22–10	Tunisia	Ivory Coast and Uganda		
2010	Not assigned ^{3}						
2011	Nairobi, Kenya	Kenya	16–7	Tunisia	No third place		
2012	Jemmal, Tunisia	Zimbabwe	22–18	Uganda	Kenya	31–24	Tunisia
2013	Antananarivo, Madagascar	Kenya	29–17	Zimbabwe	Madagascar	48–32	Uganda
2014	Antananarivo, Madagascar	Namibia	^{n/a}	Zimbabwe	Kenya	^{n/a}	Madagascar
2015	Windhoek, Namibia	Namibia	^{n/a}	Zimbabwe	Kenya	^{n/a}	Tunisia
2016	Windhoek, Namibia	Namibia	^{n/a}	Kenya	Uganda	^{n/a}	Zimbabwe
Gold Cup
2017	Nairobi, Kenya	Namibia	^{n/a}	Kenya	Uganda	^{n/a}	Tunisia
2018	(African Union); Multiple hosts	Namibia	^{n/a}	Kenya	Uganda	^{n/a}	Tunisia
2019	Cancelled ^{4}						
Rugby Africa Cup
2019–20	Cancelled after the qualification stage due to the COVID-19 pandemic in Africa.						
2021–22	Aix-en-Provence, France	Namibia	36–0	Kenya	Algeria	20–12	Zimbabwe
2024	Kampala, Uganda	Zimbabwe	29–3	Algeria	Namibia	38–27	Kenya
2025	Kampala, Uganda	Zimbabwe	30–28	Namibia	Algeria	15–5	Kenya

^n/a A round-robin tournament determined the final standings.
^^{1} The aggregate results was drawn 33-33. Namibia won on tries scored.
^^{2} Namibia won the series with aggregate results of 40-23.
^^{3} In the 2010 Africa Cup no outright winner was declared. Morocco beat Tunisia 29–6 in the final of the north section, whilst Kenya won the 2010 Victoria Cup in the south.
^^{4} The Gold, Silver, and Bronze Cups of the 2019 season were cancelled due to a lack of funding, brought on by the loss of broadcast sponsor Kwese Sports. The Victoria Cup was revived to replace it, which was won by Zimbabwe.

== Overall ==
The overall record of the teams are as follows:

Team	Champions	Runners-up	Third	Fourth	Losing semi-finals
Namibia	9 (2002, 2004, 2009, 2014, 2015, 2016, 2017, 2018, 2022)	3 (2003, 2006, 2025)	1 (2024)	–	1 (2005)
Zimbabwe	3 (2012, 2024, 2025)	3 (2013, 2014, 2015)	–	2 (2016, 2022)	–
South Africa Amateurs	3 (2000, 2001, 2006)	–	–	–	1 (2005)
Kenya	2 (2011, 2013)	4 (2016, 2017, 2018, 2022)	4 (2007, 2012, 2014, 2015)	2 (2024, 2025)	–
Morocco	2 (2003, 2005)	3 (2000, 2001, 2004)	–	–	1 (2006)
Uganda	1 (2007)	1 (2012)	3 (2016, 2017, 2018)	1 (2013)	2 (2003, 2009)
Tunisia	–	3 (2002, 2009, 2011)	–	4 (2012, 2015, 2017, 2018)	–
Madagascar	–	2 (2005, 2007)	1 (2013)	1 (2014)	2 (2003, 2006)
Algeria	–	1 (2024)	2 (2022, 2025)	–	–
Ivory Coast	–	–	–	1 (2007)	1 (2009)

== Rugby Africa Gold Cup perpetual trophy ==
The Rugby Africa Gold Cup is the perpetual trophy awarded to the winner of the Africa Cup (Africa Gold Cup), an annual rugby union tournament involving Africa's top six national 15-man teams (excluding South Africa), organised by World Rugby's African association, Rugby Africa, since 2000.

The Rugby Africa Gold Cup perpetual trophy – a Rugby World Cup qualifier – has been officially unveiled during the International Sports Press Association (AIPS) Congress in Brussels on May 8, 2018, in the presence of Abdelaziz Bougja, President of Rugby Africa, Nicolas Pompigne-Mognard, Founder of APO Group and main official partner of Rugby Africa, Gianni Merlo, President of the International Sports Press Association, AIPS, and Mitchell Obi, President of AIPS Africa.

It has been presented to the winner of the Rugby Africa Gold Cup for the first time in August 2018.

Prior to this date, each winner of the Rugby Africa Gold Cup received a trophy.

The back of the trophy is engraved with the text "Presented by Nicolas Pompigne-Mognard, Founder of APO Group; Abdelaziz Bougja, President of Rugby Africa".

Handmade by Swatkins, Great Britain's leading Trophy, Award and Silverware manufacturer since 1898, the Rugby Africa Gold Cup is a Gold Plated Perpetual Trophy Cup. Standing at a height of 47 centimetres (18.5 in) and weighing 3.3 kilograms (7.3 lb), it features a smooth Georgian-bodied design, complete with patterned handles, a stepped lid that is supplied complete with a circular solid African mahogany base. The Trophy has been engraved with the text 'Rugby Africa Gold Cup' and has the shape of Africa in pride of place on the main body. To complete, on the gold plated plinth band this holds the names of the winners. It's estimated there is enough space for at least 70 winning teams' names to be engraved on the base of the perpetual trophy, which would allow it to be used until at least the year 2080.

== Lower level championships ==
=== Second level ===
Year	Host	Final			Third place match		
Year	Host	Winner	Score	Runner-up	Third	Score	Fourth
Africa Cup 1B
2011	Kampala, Uganda	Zimbabwe	^{n/a}	Uganda	Madagascar		
2012	Antananarivo, Madagascar	Madagascar	^{n/a}	Namibia	Senegal	^{n/a}	Morocco
2013	Dakar, Senegal	Namibia	45–13	Tunisia	Senegal	41–5	Botswana
2014	Nabeul, Tunisia	Tunisia	26–6	Ivory Coast	Senegal	32–31	Uganda
2015	Kampala, Uganda	Uganda	^{n/a}	Madagascar	Senegal	^{n/a}	Ivory Coast
2016	Monastir, Tunisia	Senegal	15–14	Tunisia	No third place		
Rugby Africa Silver Cup
2017	Casablanca, Morocco	Morocco	8–3	Ivory Coast	Madagascar	47–19	Botswana
2018	Mufulira, Zambia	Algeria	31–0	Zambia	No third place		

^n/a A round-robin tournament determined the final standings.

=== Third level ===
Year	Host	Final			Third place match		
Year	Host	Winner	Score	Runner-up	Third	Score	Fourth
Africa Cup 1C
2011	Yaoundé, Cameroon	Senegal	15–6	Cameroon	Zambia	17–12	Botswana
2012	Gaborone, Botswana	Botswana	^{n/a}	Ivory Coast	Mauritius	^{n/a}	Zambia
2013	Yamoussoukro, Ivory Coast	Ivory Coast	^{n/a}	Morocco	Nigeria	^{n/a}	Zambia
2014	Gaborone, Botswana	(South Africa) Impala RC	^{n/a}	Mauritius	Botswana	^{n/a}	Nigeria
2015	Lusaka, Zambia	Zambia	^{n/a}	Nigeria	Zimbabwe B		
2016	Casablanca, Morocco	Morocco	^{n/a}	Nigeria	Mauritius		
Rugby Africa Bronze Cup
2017	Mufulira, Zambia	Algeria	30–25	Zambia	No third place		
2018	Elmina, Ghana	Ghana	23–17	Mauritius	Rwanda	32–22	Lesotho

^n/a A round-robin tournament determined the final standings.

=== Fourth level ===
Year	Host	Final			Third place match		
Year	Host	Winner	Score	Runner-up	Third	Score	Fourth
Africa Cup 1D
2011	Johannesburg, South Africa	Mauritius	41–12	Nigeria	No third place		

== See also ==
- Rugby Africa Women's Cup
- Rugby Africa Sevens
- African Development Trophy
- Victoria Cup
- North African Tri Nations
