= 2003 Africa Cup =

4th Africa Cup
- Date: 6 January 2003– 28 February 2004
- Countries: Botswana; Ivory Coast; Kenya; Madagascar; Morocco; Namibia; Tunisia; Uganda; Zimbabwe

Final positions
- Champions: Morocco
- Runner-up: Namibia

Tournament statistics
- Matches played: 11

The 2003 Africa Cup (officially called at those time "Africa Top Nive") was the fourth edition of highest level rugby union tournament in Africa Nine teams were admitted, but Tunisia withdrew. The final was played in 2004, due to the participation of Namibia in the 2003 Rugby World Cup tournament. The teams were divided in three pools, with the winner of the pool and the better second admitted to the semifinals. A second division was also played

== Division 1 (Africa Cup) ==
=== Regional pools ===
==== Pool A ====
Place	Nation	Games				Points			Table points
Place	Nation	played	won	drawn	lost	for	against	difference	Table points
1	Morocco	2	2	0	0	39	16	+23	4
2	Ivory Coast	2	1	0	1	37	18	+19	2
3	Tunisia (withdraw)	2	0	0	2	0	42	-42	0

1 June 2003

Ivory Coast	16 – 18	Morocco

Abidjan

Morocco	21 – 0 (Withdraw)	Tunisia

Tunisia	0 – 21 (Withdraw)	Ivory Coast

==== Pool 2 ====
Place	Nation	Games				Points			Table points
Place	Nation	played	won	drawn	lost	for	against	difference	Table points
1	Namibia	2	2	0	0	94	27	+67	4
2	Kenya	2	1	0	1	90	41	+49	2
3	Botswana	2	0	0	2	26	142	-116	0

12 July 2003

Namibia	62 – 17	Botswana

Windhoek

2 August 2003

Botswana	9 – 80	Kenya

Gaborone

16 August 2003

Kenya	10 – 32	Namibia

Nairobi

==== Pool 3 ====
Place	Nation	Games				Points			Table points
Place	Nation	played	won	drawn	lost	for	against	difference	Table points
1	Madagascar	2	2	0	0	55	30	+25	4
2	Uganda	2	1	0	1	55	33	+22	2
3	Zimbabwe	2	0	0	2	3	46	-43	0

5 July 2003

Uganda	25 – 3	Zimbabwe

Kampala

3 August 2003

Madagascar	32 – 30	Uganda

Antananarivo

Zimbabwe	0 – 21 (Withdraw)	Madagascar

=== Knockout stage ===
==== Semifinals ====
31 August 2003

Namibia	82 – 13	Uganda

Windhoek

28 September 2003

Madagascar	36 – 62	Morocco

Antananarivo

==== Final ====
28 February 2004

Morocco	27 – 7	Namibia

Casablanca
