= Senegal national rugby union team =

Senegal
- Union: Senegalese Rugby Federation
- Head coach: Jean-Marc Foucras
- Captain: Steeve Sargos
- Top scorer: Steeve Sargos (136)
First colours

World Rugby ranking
- Current: 45 (as of 21 July 2025)
- Highest: 45 (21 July 2025)

First international
- Senegal 9–15 Ivory Coast (1977)

Biggest win
- Senegal 59–0 Mauritania (7 June 2004)

Biggest defeat
- Namibia 95–0 Senegal (Windhoek, Namibia; 9 July 2017)

The Senegal national rugby union team represents Senegal in the sport of rugby union. They are ranked as a tier-three nation by the International Rugby Board (IRB). Senegal has thus far not qualified for a Rugby World Cup but has competed in qualifying tournaments. They also contest the annual Africa Cup.

== History ==
Senegal first played international matches against Côte d'Ivoire in 2003 and 2004.

In 2005, Senegal played in qualifying tournaments for the 2007 Rugby World Cup in France. They finished first in the final standings of their pool, after defeating Cameroon and Nigeria. They advanced to the play-off, defeating Zambia to advance to Round 1b. However, they finished third in their pool in Round 1b after losing to Côte d'Ivoire and Zimbabwe.

== Tournament history ==
=== Africa Cup ===
Africa Cup record
Year	Round/Result	P	W	D	L	PF	PA
2006	Pool Stage	2	1	0	1	25	100
2007	Pool Stage	2	0	0	2	16	23
2008–09	Pool Stage	1	0	0	1	10	13
2011	Group 1C	2	2	0	0	45	18
2012	Group 1B	2	1	0	1	44	45
2013	Group 1B	2	1	0	1	53	40
2014	Group 1B	2	1	0	1	46	53
2015	Group 1B	3	1	0	2	82	48
2016	Group 1B	3	3	0	0	99	41
2017	Gold Cup	5	0	0	5	75	211
2018	Silver Cup	2	0	0	2	39	47
2019	Did not participate						
2019–20	Cancelled	1	1	0	0	63	0
2021–22	7th	5	3	0	2	111	132
2024	6th	3	1	0	2	73	78
2025	5th	3	2	0	1	73	91

== World Cup record ==
World Cup record								World Cup Qualification record					
Year	Round	P	W	D	L	F	A	P	W	D	L	F	A
(Australia) (New Zealand) 1987	did not enter							No qualifying tournament held					
(United Kingdom) (Republic of Ireland) (France) 1991	did not enter							did not enter					
(South Africa) 1995	did not enter							did not enter					
(Wales) 1999	did not enter							did not enter					
(Australia) 2003	did not enter							did not enter					
(France) 2007	did not qualify							6	4	0	2	108	67
(New Zealand) 2011	did not qualify							1	0	0	1	10	13
(England) 2015	did not qualify							4	2	0	2	97	85
(Japan) 2019	did not qualify							8	3	0	5	174	252
(France) 2023	did not qualify												
Total	0/9	0	0	0	0	0	0	19	9	0	10	389	417

== Record ==
Below is a table of the representative rugby matches played by a Senegal national XV at test level up until 19 July 2025, updated after match with Morocco.

Opponent	Played	Won	Lost	Drawn	% Won
Algeria	3	0	3	0	0%
Benin	1	1	0	0	100%
Botswana	3	2	1	0	66.67%
Burkina Faso	2	2	0	0	100%
Cameroon	4	4	0	0	100%
Ghana	1	1	0	0	100%
Ivory Coast	11	5	6	0	45.45%
Kenya	4	1	3	0	25%
Madagascar	1	1	0	0	100%
Mali	3	1	2	0	33.33%
Mauritania	1	1	0	0	100%
Mauritius	2	2	0	0	100%
Morocco	2	2	0	0	100%
Namibia	5	0	5	0	0%
Niger	1	1	0	0	100%
Nigeria	1	1	0	0	100%
South Africa Amateurs	1	0	1	0	0%
Switzerland	1	1	0	0	100%
Togo	2	2	0	0	100%
Tunisia	5	1	4	0	20%
Uganda	4	1	3	0	25%
Zambia	4	4	0	0	100%
Zimbabwe	2	0	2	0	0%
Total	64	34	30	0	45.45%

== See also ==
- Rugby union in Senegal
