= Nicolas Pompigne-Mognard =

Swiss businessman (born 1975)

Nicolas Pompigne Mognard
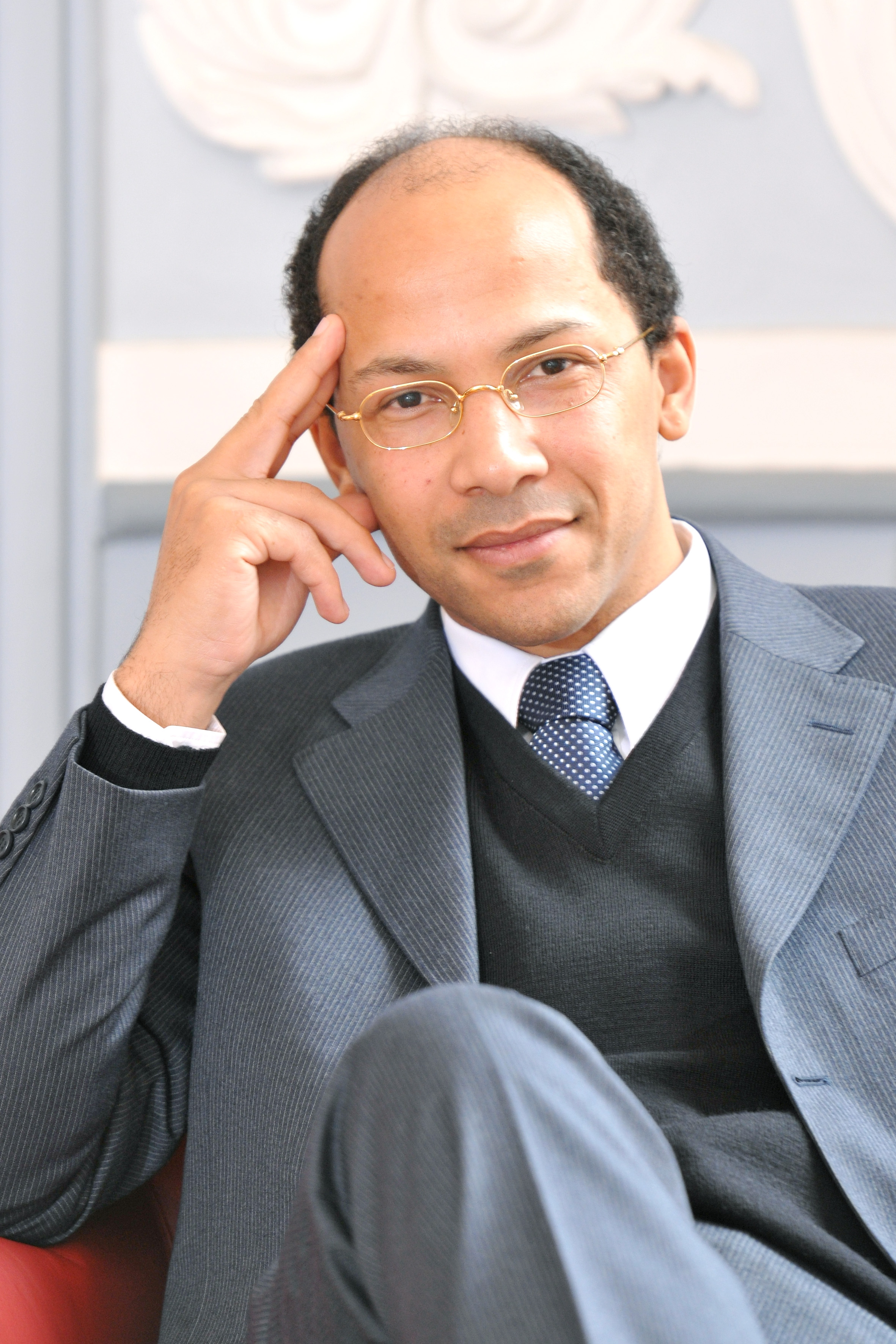
- Mognard, founder, Chairman and 100% owner of APO Group
- Born: 3 November 1975 (age 50); Valence d'Agen, France
- Occupations: Founder, chairman and 100% owner of APO Group, Angel investor
- Years active: 2005–present
- Spouse: Marie Noëlle Pompigne Mognard (m. 1999)
- Children: 2 daughters, 1 son
- Website: http://www.pompigne-mognard.com

Nicolas Pompigne-Mognard (born November 3, 1975) is a Franco-Gabonese self-made entrepreneur, and angel investor. A former journalist, he is the founder and chairman of APO Group.

Nicolas Pompigne-Mognard is a Senior Advisory Board member of The Canada-Africa Chamber of Business, a member of the advisory board of the African Energy Chamber (AEC), and member of the advisory board of the Africa Hotel Investment Forum (AHIF), the premier hotel investment conference in Africa. He is also member of the Advisor Board of the EurAfrican Forum, an action-oriented platform that aims to foster stronger collaboration between Europe and Africa.

APO Group is the main Official Sponsor of World Rugby's African association, Rugby Africa, the public relations agency of the National Basketball Association (NBA) in Africa, and Getty Images' strategic partner in Africa and the Middle East.

According to the American business magazine Forbes, APO Group has an annual turnover of several million dollars.

According to The Vanguard (Nigeria), APO Group has experienced a record growth of 60% in 2018.

== Career ==
Nicolas Pompigne-Mognard is currently chairman and 100% owner of APO Group. According to the American business magazine Forbes, Pompigne-Mognard is focusing on delivering high-level counsel for APO Group clients and developing his own investment fund dedicated to Africa.

== Rugby ==
In November 2017, the company he owns, APO Group, became the Main Official Sponsor of World Rugby's African association, Rugby Africa, the governing body of rugby in Africa.

In May 2018, Nicolas unveiled the Rugby Africa Gold Cup perpetual trophy, also known as the Africa Cup – a Rugby World Cup qualifier – during the International Sports Press Association (AIPS) Congress in Brussels, in the presence of Abdelaziz Bougja, President of Rugby Africa, Gianni Merlo and President of the International Sports Press Association, AIPS[Italian].
