= 2019 Rugby Africa season =

19th Africa Cup
Final positions
- Champions: Zimbabwe
- Runner-up: Kenya

The 2019 Rugby Africa season experienced significant restructuring and downsizing from the previous two seasons due to the loss of sponsor Kwese Sports. Due to the lack of funding, the previous formats of the Gold, Silver, and Bronze divisions of the Africa Cup were replaced with a revival of the Victoria Cup and a regional West African series.

== Men's Tournaments ==
=== Victoria Cup ===
The Victoria Cup was held for the first time since 2011 and featured four nations playing a double round robin. The fixtures between Kenya and Uganda doubled as the two legs of the Elgon Cup.

2019 Victoria Cup
Pos	Team	Pl	W	D	L	PF	PA	PD	BP	Pts
1	Zimbabwe	6	5	0	1	187	132	+55	3	23
2	Kenya	6	4	0	2	168	104	+64	5	21
3	Uganda	6	3	0	3	146	140	+6	2	14
4	Zambia	6	0	0	6	102	227	-125	0	0
* Legend: Pos = Position, Pl = Played, W = Won, D = Drawn, L = Lost, PF = Points for, PA = Points against, PD = Points difference, Pts = Log points. 1 bonus point for a loss by less than 8 points, 1 bonus point for scoring 3 more tries than opponent

Matches

22 June 2019	Kenya	13-16	Uganda	Mamboleo Showground, Kisumu
		WR Report; RA Report

13 July 2019	Uganda	5-16	Kenya	Kyadondo Rugby Club, Kampala
		WR Report

13 July 2019	Zimbabwe	39-10	Zambia	Harare Sports Club, Harare
		WR Report; RA Report

27 July 2019	Zambia	23-43	Kenya	Diggers Rugby Club, Kitwe
		WR Report		Attendance: 3,500

27 July 2019	Uganda	26-31	Zimbabwe	Legends RC, Kampala
		WR Report

3 August 2019	Zimbabwe	30-29	Kenya	Hartsfield, Bulawayo
		WR Report; RA Report		Attendance: 2,500

17 August 2019	Uganda	38-22	Zambia	Kyadondo Rugby Club, Kampala
		WR Report

24 August 2019	Zimbabwe	32-26	Uganda	Harare Sports Club, Harare
		WR Report

24 August 2019	Kenya	31-16	Zambia	RFUEA Ground, Nairobi
		WR Report		Attendance: 1,800

31 August 2019	Zambia	26-35	Uganda	Chester Dean Arena, Lusaka
		WR Report		Attendance: 2,000

14 September 2019	Zambia	5-41	Zimbabwe	Chester Dean Arena, Lusaka
		WR Report		Attendance: 2,500

21 September 2019	Kenya	36-14	Zimbabwe	NAC Grounds, Nairobi
		WR Report		Attendance: 2,500

=== West African Series ===
The Ghana Rugby Football Union organized a regional series for West African nations.

2018 Rugby Africa Gold Cup
Pos	Team	Pl	W	D	L	PF	PA	PD	BP	Pts
1	Ivory Coast	2	2	0	0	37	26	+11	0	8
2	Nigeria	2	1	0	1	28	27	+1	1	5
3	Ghana	2	0	0	2	24	36	-12	1	1
* Legend: Pos = Position, Pl = Played, W = Won, D = Drawn, L = Lost, PF = Points for, PA = Points against, PD = Points difference, Pts = Log points. 1 bonus point for a loss by less than 8 points, 1 bonus point for scoring 3 more tries than opponent

28 July 2019	Ghana	12-22	Ivory Coast	Nduom Sports Stadium, Elmina
		WR Report; RA Report		Attendance: 100

31 July 2019	Ivory Coast	15-14	Nigeria	Nduom Sports Stadium, Elmina
		WR Report; RA Report		Attendance: 100

3 August 2019	Ghana	12-14	Nigeria	Nduom Sports Stadium, Elmina
		WR Report; RA Report		Attendance: 150
