= Rugby union in Cameroon =

- Country: Cameroon
- Governing body: Cameroonian Rugby Federation
- National team: Cameroon
- Registered players: 3,213
- Clubs: 15

National competitions
- Rugby World Cup; Rugby World Cup Sevens; IRB Sevens World Series

Rugby union is a minor but growing sport in Cameroon. They were ranked 104th by the IRB as of August 2022.

== Governing body ==
The governing body for the game is the Cameroonian Rugby Federation (Fédération Camerounaise de Rugby).

== History ==
Cameroon is a former French colony, and the sport was introduced from France. Originally the game was mainly played by white expatriates. However, most of the participants these days are Cameroonians.

Cameroon has a long-established union and players come from all walks of life. However, due to bad economic conditions, and the migration of many players to France, such as Serge Betsen, it has been difficult to maintain a decent domestic game.

Carol Manga (born c. 1988), who grew up in Yaounde, loved football as a child, and started playing rugby union at the age of 14, going on to play in the national team at the age of 16. He has captained both rugby sevens and rugby union teams. After moving to Australia in 2008 to play rugby, he discovered and fell in love with rugby league, and took the game back to Cameroon in 2012, helping to establish the Cameroon Rugby League XIII.

In 2002, the Confederation of African Rugby held their conference in Cameroon.

== See also ==
- Cameroon national rugby union team
- Confederation of African Rugby
- Africa Cup
