= 2000 Africa Cup =

African rugby tournament

1st Africa Cup
Tournament details
- Date: 17 June 2000– 15 December 2000
- Teams: Ivory Coast; Morocco; Namibia; South Africa Amateurs; Tunisia; Zimbabwe

Final positions
- Champions: South Africa Amateurs
- Runner-up: Morocco

Tournament statistics
- Matches played: 21

The 2000 Africa Cup (officially called at those time "Africa Top Six") was the first edition of highest level rugby union tournament in Africa.

Only five teams were involved due to the withdrawal of the Ivory Coast. South Africa participated with an Under-23 amateurs team.

The teams were divided in two pool played on home away basis.

== Regional pools ==
=== Pool South ===
Place	Nation	Games				Points			Table points
Place	Nation	played	won	drawn	lost	for	against	difference	Table points
1	South Africa Amateurs	4	4	0	0	259	43	+216	8
2	Namibia	4	2	0	2	93	204	-111	4
3	Zimbabwe	4	0	0	4	82	187	-105	0

17 June 2000

South Africa Amateurs	64 – 12	Zimbabwe

Pretoria

24 June 2000

South Africa Amateurs	91 – 3	Namibia

Bloemfontein

1 July 2000

Zimbabwe	26 – 31	Namibia

Harare

8 July 2000

Namibia	18 – 53	South Africa Amateurs

Windhoek

15 July 2000

Zimbabwe	10 – 51	South Africa Amateurs

Harare

22 July 2000

Namibia	41 – 34	Zimbabwe

Windhoek

=== Pool North ===
Place	Nation	Games				Points			Table points
Place	Nation	played	won	drawn	lost	for	against	difference	Table points
1	Morocco	2	2	0	0	42	29	+13	4
2	Tunisia	2	0	0	2	29	42	-13	0

7 October 2000

Morocco	27 – 9	Tunisia

Casablanca

4 November 2000

Tunisia	20 – 25	Morocco

Tunis

== Final ==
16 December 2000

Morocco	14 – 44	South Africa Amateurs

Casablanca
