= Azeez Ladipo =

Nigerian rugby union player

Azeez Olaitan Ladipo, born on March 24, 1987, is a rugby union player from Nigeria who played for the Nigerian National Rugby Team (Stallions) in numerous competitions between 2005 and 2019.

== Life and career ==
Azeez Ladipo is a playmaker and fly half. As a youth, he began playing for Nigeria's Lagos Rugby Club, Racing Rugby Club, and Cowrie Rugby Club. Later, he played for the Chicago Blaze Rugby Club in the USA

Azeez chose to focus on entrepreneurship and sports management after retiring playing rugby, and in 2022 he was appointed General Manager of the Nigeria Rugby Football Federation (NRFF).
