= Hedi Souid =

- Born: August 22, 1983 (age 43)
- Height: 1.82 m (5 ft 11 1/2 in)
- Weight: 105 kg (231 lb; 16.5 st)

Rugby union career
- Position: Prop
Senior career
Years	Team	Apps	(Points)
2006-	Montluçon Rugby		
International career
Years	Team	Apps	(Points)
- Tunisia

Hedi Souid (born 22 August 1983) is a Tunisian rugby union player. Hedi Souid's choice of position is prop.

He plays for Montluçon Rugby since 2006/07.

He is currently the captain of Tunisia.
