= Tunisia national rugby union team =

Tunisia
- Nicknames: نسور قرطاج (Eagles of Carthage)
- Union: Tunisian Rugby Federation
- Head coach: Danie de Villiers
- Captain: Hedi Souid
First colours	Second colours

World Rugby ranking
- Current: 38 (as of 4 April 2022)

First international
- Netherlands 12–0 Tunisia (1 July 1979)

Biggest win
- Tunisia 52–5 Kenya (Tunis, Tunisia; 20 September 1997)

Biggest defeat
- Namibia 118–0 Tunisia (Windhoek, Namibia; 23 June 2018)

World Cup
- Appearances: 0

The Tunisia national rugby union team is a third-tier rugby union nation. They first started competing in 1979 and they competed in the African qualification for the 2007 Rugby World Cup.

Tunisia also competes annually in the Africa Cup.

== History ==
Tunisia played their first match on July 1, 1979, facing the Netherlands and losing 12–0.

Their first win came in 1982, when they beat Portugal, defeating them, 16–13. A period from 1982 through to 1983 saw the team undefeated for a number of games. Tunisia played some of the stronger rugby union nations towards the end of the decade, for example, Italy, Romania and the United States; Tunisia lost these matches.

They participated in round 2 of the 2007 Rugby World Cup Africa qualification as well as qualification for the 2011 Rugby World Cup, coming in second to Namibia after losing 22–10. Eligible for qualification through the inter-continental playoff, Tunisia lost in the first match to Romania 56–13

== Record ==
Below is a table of the representative rugby matches played by a Tunisia national XV at test level up until 21 November 2026, updated after the match with Switzerland.

Opponent	Played	Won	Lost	Drawn	% Won
Algeria	4	2	2	0	50%
Andorra	4	3	1	0	75%
Arabian Gulf	2	1	1	0	50%
Barbarians	1	0	1	0	0%
Belgium	11	5	5	1	45.45%
Botswana	2	2	0	0	100%
Cameroon	2	2	0	0	100%
Catalonia	1	0	1	0	0%
Czechoslovakia	4	2	2	0	50%
Czech Republic	1	1	0	0	100%
Denmark	1	1	0	0	100%
France A	4	0	4	0	0%
Germany	2	1	1	0	50%
Hong Kong	2	1	1	0	50%
Italy	3	0	3	0	0%
Italy A	1	0	1	0	0%
Ivory Coast	10	4	5	1	40%
Junior Japan	1	0	1	0	0%
Kenya	10	3	7	0	30%
Latvia	1	1	0	0	100%
Luxembourg	1	1	0	0	100%
Morocco	25	5	18	2	20%
Namibia	11	2	9	0	18.18%
Netherlands	5	1	4	0	20%
Nigeria	1	1	0	0	100%
Poland	7	4	3	0	57.14%
Portugal	9	6	3	0	66.67%
Romania	5	1	4	0	20%
Romania A	1	1	0	0	100%
Russia	2	0	2	0	0%
Senegal	5	4	1	0	80%
South Africa A	1	0	1	0	0%
Soviet Union	3	0	3	0	0%
Spain	5	1	4	0	20%
Spain A	1	0	1	0	0%
Sweden	1	1	0	0	100%
Switzerland	3	3	0	0	100%
Uganda	6	2	4	0	33.33%
United Arab Emirates	1	1	0	0	100%
United States	1	0	1	0	0%
Yugoslavia	5	3	2	0	60%
West Germany	2	1	1	0	50%
Zambia	1	1	0	0	100%
Zimbabwe	6	2	4	0	33.33%
Total	175	70	101	4	40%

== World Cup Record ==
World Cup record								World Cup Qualification record					
Year	Round	P	W	D	L	F	A	P	W	D	L	F	A
(Australia) (New Zealand) 1987		did not qualify						-					
(United Kingdom) (Republic of Ireland) (France) 1991		did not qualify						3	2	0	1	41	43
(South Africa) 1995		did not qualify						2	0	0	2	21	25
(Wales) 1999		did not qualify						4	2	0	2	92	77
(Australia) 2003		did not qualify						5	3	0	2	99	110
(France) 2007		did not qualify						4	2	0	2	91	67
(New Zealand) 2011		did not qualify						7	4	0	3	175	151
(England) 2015		did not qualify						2	1	0	1	56	57
(Japan) 2019		did not qualify						13	6	0	7	264	581
(France) 2023		did not qualify						to be determined					
Total	0/9	0	0	0	0	0	0	40	20	0	20	839	1111

== Africa Cup Record ==
Africa Cup record
Year	Round	P	W	D	L	F	A
2000	Round 1	2	0	0	2	29	52
2001	Round 1	4	0	1	3	28	104
2002	Runner-up	4	3	0	1	83	77
2003	Round 1	2	0	0	2	0	42
2004	Round 1	3	1	0	2	26	28
2005	Round 1	2	0	0	2	18	27
2006	Round 1	4	2	0	2	91	67
2007	Round 1	2	1	0	1	25	22
2008–09	Runner-up	6	4	0	2	162	95
2010	cancelled						
2011	Runner-up	1	0	0	1	7	16
2012	Round 1	2	0	0	2	38	61
2013	Division 1B Runner-up	2	1	0	1	56	57
2014	Division 1B winner	2	2	0	0	48	20
2015	Division 1A 4th	3	0	0	3	37	87
2016	Division 1B winner	3	3	0	0	107	30
2017	Gold Cup 4th	5	2	0	3	91	272
2018	Gold Cup 4th	5	2	0	3	66	279
2019	cancelled						
2019–20	cancelled						
2021–22		Withdrew					
Total	20/20	52	21	1	30	912	1336

== Current squad ==
Players called up to Tunisia 2021 Africa Cup preparation squad.

- Head Coach:
- Assistant Coach:
- Assistant Coach:
- Assistant Coach:

Forwards
Player	Position	Club

Backs
Player	Position	Club
