= Abdelaziz Bougja =

French rugby union executive

Bougja Abdelaziz
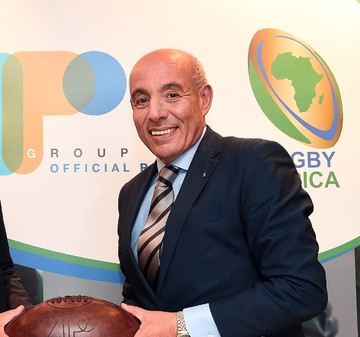
- Born: Morocco
- Known for: President of Rugby Africa

Bougja Abdelaziz is the former President of World Rugby' African association, Rugby Africa (2002-2019), the administrative body for rugby union in Africa. He is vice-president of the French Association of Travel Management (French: Association Française du Travel Management (AFTM)), the first French organization that represents corporate travel managers. Bougja is member of the World Rugby Audit & Risk and Regulations committees and the Royal Moroccan Rugby Federation (FRMR). During his career, he was involved with Veolia Environment and Marco Polo. Bougja attended University of Toulouse and University of Paris Dauphine from 1975 to 1982 and received a state diploma in accounting expertise. Bougja has extensively contributed to the development of rugby in Africa. For example, during Bougja's tenure, the number of countries involved in rugby increased from 6 to 32 including 22 World Rugby associates and 10 from Rugby Africa.
