= Gianni Merlo =

Italian sports journalist

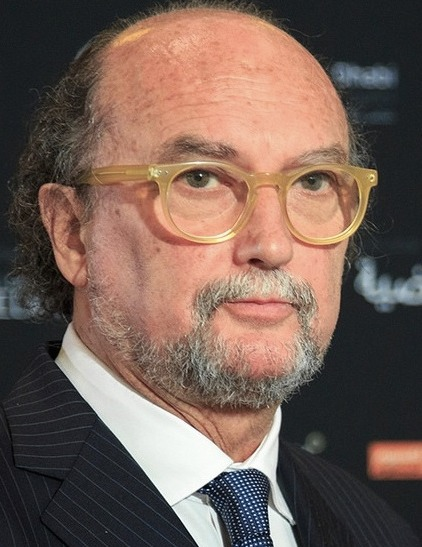
- Merlo in 2020
- Born: Giovanni Merlo; 16 April 1947 (age 79); Vigevano, Pavia, Italy
- Occupations: Sports journalist, AIPS President (2005 - current)

Giovanni "Gianni" Merlo (born in Vigevano on 16 April 1947) is an Italian sports journalist, reporter at La Gazzetta dello Sport and current president of International Sports Press Association, AIPS [Italian]. He is married, and has a son and a daughter. In his youth, he practised athletics, football, and basketball. He began his journalistic career in 1967 with the magazine "Atletica Leggera" and later became a contributor to newspapers “Il Giorno”, “La Gazzetta del Popolo” and “Stadio”.

In 1972, he served as an assistant commentator for RSI (the Swiss-Italian Radio Television), with which he participated in the 1972 Munich Olympics. In 1973, he was called to perform the same role at RAI, Italian Radio and Television.

In 1974, he was hired by the "Gazzetta dello Sport", where he held the position of head of service for athletics, skiing, and Olympic politics.

He has covered twenty-five Olympic Games events: Thirteen Winter (Innsbruck 1976, Lake Placid 1980, Sarajevo 1984, Calgary 1988, Albertville 1992, Lillehammer 1994, Nagano 1998, Salt Lake City 2002, Turin 2006, Vancouver 2010, Sochi 2014, PyeongChang 2018 and Beijing 2022) and twelve Summer (Munich 1972, Moscow 1980, Los Angeles 1984, Seoul 1988, Barcelona 1992, Atlanta 1996, Sydney 2000, Athens 2004, Beijing 2008, London 2012, Rio de Janeiro 2016 and Tokyo 2020).

He has participated in World and European Championships in athletics, skiing and other sports from 1969 to date.

In 1983, he edited two sports encyclopedias for Rizzoli: "Conoscere l'atletica" and "Conoscere lo sci".

From 1986 to 2005, he was president of the AIPS Athletics Commission. From 1994 to 1998, he was president of the European Sports Press Union (UEPS).

From 1990 to 1999, he was the director of the magazine "Atletica Leggera", and from 1990 to 2000, he edited the annual edition of the volumes "Atletica" and "Sci", photo chronicles of the competitive seasons of these sports, part of the series "The Great Illustrated Sports".

In May 2005, in Marrakech, he was elected President of the A.I.P.S. (Association Internationale de la Presse Sportive), which has 161 National Associations worldwide with more than 9000 member journalists. He was reconfirmed as president in Milan in 2009, Sochi in 2013, PyeongChang in 2017 and Rome in 2022.

In 2008, he wrote the book “Dream Runner - Running for a Dream” with Oscar Pistorius.

== Honour ==
- IAAF Award in the nomination of the best sports journalist in 2013.

== Bibliography ==
- Gianni Merlo (1998). Cooperativa Dante (ed.). Sci'98: le magie di Nagano.
- Oscar Pistorius and Gianni Merlo (2008). Rizzoli (ed.). DreamRunner. In corsa per un sogno. ISBN 9788817057691.
