= Cameroon national rugby union team =

Rugby union team representing Cameroon

Cameroon
- Nickname: Indomitable Lions
- Union: Fédération Camerounaise de Rugby
- Head coach: Philippe Saint-André
First colours

World Rugby ranking
- Current: 108 (as of 4 November 2024)
- Highest: 101 (23 November 2020)

First international
- Zambia 25–24 Cameroon (Chingola, Zambia; 28 July 2001)

Biggest win
- Cameroon 81–0 Mauritania (Bamako, Mali; 10 October 2003)

Biggest defeat
- Kenya 76–8 Cameroon (Nairobi, Kenya; 12 July 2008)

The Cameroon national rugby union team (French: Equipe du Cameroun du Rugby XV), also known as the Indomitable Lions, (Note: Most of the national sporting teams in Cameroon go by this name, including the Cameroon national rugby league team.) represents Cameroon in the sport of rugby union. They are ranked as a tier-three nation by the International Rugby Board (IRB). Cameroon have thus far not qualified for a Rugby World Cup, but have competed in qualifying tournaments. Cameroon also compete annually in the Africa Cup.

== History ==
In 2001 Cameroon played in the African qualification tournaments for the 2003 Rugby World Cup in Australia. Grouped in Pool A of Round 1, along with Uganda and Zambia. Cameroon lost their first match by one point, 25-24 to Zambia, but then defeated Uganda 17 to nil. Cameroon finished first in the final standings, advancing to Round 2.

In Round 2 Cameroon faced both Kenya and Madagascar. In their first match, Cameroon lost to Madagascar. They finished third in the standings after then losing to Kenya.

Cameroon participated in the African qualifying tournament for the 2007 Rugby World Cup, playing in the Northern Pool of Round 1a, along with Senegal and Nigeria. Cameroon finished second in the final standings after narrowly losing to Senegal, and defeating Nigeria. They also competed in the 2006 Africa Cup.

== Record ==
=== World Cup ===
World Cup record
| Year | Qualification status |
|---|---|
| (Australia) (New Zealand) 1987 | Not invited |
| (United Kingdom) (Republic of Ireland) (France) 1991 | did not enter |
| (South Africa) 1995 | did not enter |
| (Wales) 1999 | did not enter |
| (Australia) 2003 | did not qualify |
| (France) 2007 | did not qualify |
| (New Zealand) 2011 | did not qualify |
| (England) 2015 | Withdrew |
| (Japan) 2019 | did not qualify |
| (France) 2023 | |

=== Overall ===
Below is a table of the representative rugby matches played by a Cameroon national XV at test level up until 24 November 2024, updated after match with Botswana.

| Opponent | Played | Won | Lost | Drawn | % Won |
|---|---|---|---|---|---|
| Botswana | 1 | 0 | 1 | 0 | 0% |
| Burkina Faso | 1 | 0 | 1 | 0 | 0% |
| Burundi | 1 | 1 | 0 | 0 | 100% |
| Ghana | 1 | 1 | 0 | 0 | 100% |
| Ivory Coast | 1 | 0 | 1 | 0 | 0% |
| Kenya | 5 | 1 | 4 | 0 | 20% |
| Madagascar | 2 | 0 | 2 | 0 | 0% |
| Mali | 1 | 1 | 0 | 0 | 100% |
| Mauritania | 1 | 1 | 0 | 0 | 100% |
| Morocco | 3 | 0 | 3 | 0 | 0% |
| Morocco A | 1 | 1 | 0 | 0 | 100% |
| Nigeria | 2 | 2 | 0 | 0 | 100% |
| South Africa Amateurs | 1 | 0 | 1 | 0 | 0% |
| Senegal | 4 | 0 | 4 | 0 | 0% |
| Togo | 1 | 1 | 0 | 0 | 100% |
| Tunisia | 2 | 0 | 2 | 0 | 0% |
| Uganda | 2 | 1 | 1 | 0 | 50% |
| Zambia | 3 | 2 | 1 | 0 | 66.67% |
| Total | 33 | 12 | 21 | 0 | 36.36% |

== See also ==
- Rugby union in Cameroon
