= Nigeria national rugby union team =

Nigeria
- Nickname: Black Stallions
- Union: Nigeria Rugby Football Federation
- Head coach: Steve Lewis
- Captain: Declan Nwachukwu & Olukolade Awobowale (7’s Captains), Babajide Tunde (15’s Captain)
First colours	Second colours	Third colours

World Rugby ranking
- Current: 75 (as of 19 June 2026)

First international
- Nigeria 12–111 Zimbabwe (1 August 1987)

Biggest win
- Nigeria 63–3 Mauritius (23 June 2013)

Biggest defeat
- Nigeria 12–111 Zimbabwe (1 August 1987)

The Nigeria National Rugby Union team (The Stallions) represent Nigeria in men's international rugby union. Nigeria have thus far not qualified for a Rugby World Cup, but have competed in qualifying tournaments. Nigeria played their first international against Zimbabwe on 1 August 1987, losing by 111-12 in Nairobi. Their greatest success has been in the 2013 Africa Cup, where they beat Mauritius 63-3 in group 1C.

Nigeria tried to qualify for the first time for the 2007 Rugby World Cup, but lost to Senegal (6-48) and Cameroon (8-18), and were eliminated. They also missed the presence at the 2011 Rugby World Cup, after losing to Cameroon (6-26), in the pre-qualifier.

== Previous squads ==
Nigeria are currently in the top 10 of Africa Cup Sevens and top 16 of Africa Cup Fifteens. they will compete to gain promotion into the Africa Cup (Performance & First Division) in 2026.

=== Nigeria Squad for the 2012 Africa Cup ===
- Michael Adeniya (Westcombe Park, England)
- David Akinluyi (Old Olavians, England)
- Emmanuel Akinluyi (Cambridge University, England)
- Emmanuel Ayewe (Racing RFC, Lagos, Nigeria)
- Eseoghene Enajerow (Warri RFC, Warri, Nigeria)
- Udochukwu Eze (Police RFC, Nigeria)
- Nsa Harrison (Staines RFC, England)
- Nuhu Ibrahim (Barewa RFC, Kano, Nigeria)
- Adedoyin Layade (Sedgley Park, England)
- Tiwaloluwa Obisesan (GRavesend RFC, England)
- Shola Odele (Kaduna RFC, Kaduna, Nigeria)
- Felix Ogbole (Kaduna RFC, Kaduna, Nigeria)
- Temitope Okenla (Gravesend RFC, England)
- Craig Olugbode (Gateshead Thunder RL, England)
- Chukwuma Osazuwa (Gravesend RFC, England)
- Ali Shelleng (London Nigerian, England)
- Yemi Ibidunni (Old Dartfordians, England)
- Ivan Stevenson
- Francis Ugwu (Manchester Medics, England)
- Inam Jay Udo-Udoma (Blackheath and Ruislip, England)
- Ejike Uzoigbe (Worthing, England)
- Obi Wilson (Barewa RFC, Kano, Nigeria) 1984.09.24
- Samson Yahayah (Police RFC)

Head Coach: Steven Lewis (New York Blues, USA), Manager: Mark Dean (Samurai International RFC), Physio: Emma Mark (Esher RFC, England)

=== Nigeria Squad for the 2013 Africa Cup ===
- Adam Aigbokhae (Gravesend RFC, England)
- David Akinluyi (Old Olavians, England)
- Emmanuel Akinluyi (Cambridge University, England)
- John Kura (Racing Club, Lagos, Nigeria)
- Olawale Doherty (Richmond FC, England)
- Usani Ewah (Dallas Harlequins, USA)
- Abdulasmad Abdullahi (Nigeria)
- Olayemi Lawal (London Nigerian RFC, England)
- Nuhu Ibrahim (Barewa RFC, Kano, Nigeria)
- Adedoyin Layade (Sedgley Park, England)
- Tiwaloluwa Obisesan (Canterbury RFC, England)
- Ayo Salau (Aston University, England)
- Omotohunola Odulaja (Loughborough University, England)
- Temitope Okenla (Gravesend RFC, England)
- Olisa Ufodiama (London Nigerian RFC, England)
- Chukwuma Osazuwa (Gravesend RFC, England)
- Moyo Osinibi (Old Alleynian RFC, England)
- Moshope Osinibi (Old Alleynian RFC, England)
- Tan Mbonu (Enfield Ignatians RFC, England)
- Francis Ugwu (Old Midwhitgiftian RFC, England)
- Inam Jay Udo-Udoma (Barking, England)
- Obi Wilson (Barewa RFC, Kano, Nigeria)
- Gbade Adewola (Cardiff University, Wales)
- Samson Yahayah (Police RFC, Nigeria)

Head Coach: Gavin Hogg (Bury St Edmunds RFC, England), Manager: Mark Dean (Samurai International RFC), Physio: Emma Mark (Esher RFC, England)

=== Nigeria Squad for the 2014 Africa Cup 1C in Gaborone, Botswana ===
- Azeez Ladipo (Cowrie RFC, Nigeria)
- Bassey Sunday (Cowrie RFC, Nigeria)
- Samuel Olatunde Joseph (Royal Stallions RFC, Ilorin)
- Musa Ibrahim Suaibu (Kaduna RFC, Nigeria)
- Ogbole Felix Gabriel (Kaduna RFC, Nigeria)
- Alaeto Obinna Festus (Cowrie RFC, Nigeria)
- Solomon Friday (Sabongeri RFC, Nigeria)
- Sani Isaac (Cowrie RFC, Nigeria)
- Olanrewaju Azeez Abiodun (Nigeria Police RFC, Nigeria)
- Yakubu Abubakar (Sabongeri RFC, Nigeria)
- Godwin Emmanuel Chibundu (Delta RFC, Nigeria)
- Ayinla Hafis Adedamola (Cowrie RFC, Nigeria)
- Zaria Isa A (DRC PHOENIX, Gronegen, Holland)
- Bakare Ramon Ishola (Nigeria Police RFC, Nigeria)
- Peter Okere Ambrose (Jos RFC, Nigeria)
- Samson Yahaya Didam (Nigeria Police RFC, Nigeria)
- Oyeyemi Yusuf Olatunji (Cowrie RFC, Nigeria)
- Dinobi Chiedozie Nzubechukwuka (Cobham Rugby Club, UK)
- Ogar Christian Innocent (Cowrie RFC, Nigeria)
- Enajeroh Eseoghene (Warri RFC, Nigeria)
- Olawale Oladipo Michael (Cowrie RFC, Nigeria)
- Oyebola Sulyman Olawale (Nigeria Police RFC, Nigeria)

Manager: Dele Coker, Assistant Coaches: Richard Raphael (Kaduna RFC), Ofoha Joseph (Cowrie RFC)

=== Nigeria Squad for the 2015 Africa Cup 1C in Lusaka, Zambia ===
- Azeez Ladipo (Cowrie RFC, Nigeria)
- Bassey Sunday (Cowrie RFC, Nigeria)
- Emmanuel Ayewe (Racing RFC, Nigeria)
- Emmanuel Bamidele Samuel (Plateau Tigers RFC, Nigeria)
- Francis Akeju (Plateau Tigers RFC, Nigeria)
- Emmanuel Godwin (Delta RFC, Nigeria)
- Sodiq Oduola (Cowrie RFC, Nigeria)
- Sani Isaac (Cowrie RFC, Nigeria)
- Olanrewaju Azeez Abiodun (Nigeria Police RFC, Nigeria)
- Adebayo Odumosu-Jones (Lagos RFC, Nigeria)
- Godwin Emmanuel Chibundu (Delta RFC, Nigeria)
- Ayinla Hafis Adedamola (Cowrie RFC, Nigeria)
- Leslie Ikenna Ume (Scarborough RFC, UK)
- Nuhu Ibrahim Samaila (Barewa RFC, Kano)
- Obi Izuchukwu Wilson (Barewa RFC, Kano)
- Samson Yahaya Didam (Nigeria Police RFC, Nigeria)
- Sammuel Ekpo (Cowrie RFC, Nigeria)
- Chijioke Thomas Emmanuel (Cowrie RFC, Nigeria)
- Ogar Christian Innocent (Cowrie RFC, Nigeria)
- Ugwu Francis Michael (Nigeria Exiles RFC, UK)
- Peter Okere Ambrose (Plateau Tigers RFC, Nigeria)
- Halilu Sani (Cowrie RFC, Nigeria)
- Jatto Onoru-Oyiza Jude (Cowrie RFC, Nigeria)
- Adeniran Gbenga Hammed (Cosar RFC, Nigeria)

Manager: Fabian Juries, Team Doctor/Physio: Bukola Bojuwoye

=== Nigeria Squad for the 2016 Africa Cup 1C in Casablanca, Morocco ===
- Azeez Ladipo (Cowrie RFC, Nigeria)
- Francis Akeju (Plateau Tigers RFC, Nigeria)
- Jatto Onoru Oyiza (Cowrie RFC, Nigeria)
- John oladele (Cowrie RFC, Nigeria)
- Francis Akeju (Plateau Tigers RFC, Nigeria)
- Alfred Oche (Cowrie RFC, Nigeria)
- Sodiq Oduola (Cowrie RFC, Nigeria)
- Sani Isaac (Cowrie RFC, Nigeria)
- Isa Hassan (Kaduna RFC, Nigeria)
- Okafor ThankgGod (Sharks RFC, South Africa)
- Iheme Chidera (Plateau Tigers RFC, Nigeria)
- Ayinla Hafis Adedamola (Cowrie RFC, Nigeria)
- Obinna Alaeto (Cowrie RFC, Nigeria)
- Oladipo Olawale (Cowrie RFC, Nigeria)
- Obi Izuchukwu Wilson (Barewa RFC, Kano)
- Aniedi George (Nigeria Police RFC, Nigeria)
- Victor Afam (Nigeria Police RFC, Nigeria)
- Peter Ambrose Okere (Plateau Tigers RFC, Nigeria)
- Ogar Christian Innocent (Cowrie RFC, Nigeria)
- John Kura (Racing RFC, UK)
- Yannick Mukoro (EkoII RFC, Nigeria)
- Samaila Agwam (Kaduna RFC, Nigeria)
- Monday omoragieva (Racing RFC, Nigeria)

Manager: Fabian Juries, Assistant Coach: Joseph Ofoha/Richard Raphael, Team Doctor/Physio: Bukola Bojuwoye

=== Nigeria Squad for the 2018 West Africa Regional Test Match versus Niger Republic in Niamey, Niger ===
- Azeez Ladipo (Cowrie RFC, Nigeria) Captain
- Godwin Dina Otoro Jrn (Vice Captain), Italy
- Jatto Onoru Oyiza (Cowrie RFC, Nigeria)
- Sunday Bassey (Cowrie RFC, Nigeria)
- Ibrahim Suraj (Barewa RFC, Nigeria)
- John Kurah (Racing RFC, Nigeria)
- Onome Richard (Barewa RFC, Nigeria)
- Felix Adebayo (Nigeria Police RFC, Nigeria)
- Samuel Ekpo (Cowrie RFC, Nigeria)
- Isaac Sani (Cowrie RFC, Nigeria)
- Hassan Mohammed (Cowrie RFC, Nigeria)
- Alfred Oche (Cowrie RFC, Nigeria)
- Joshua Etim (Barewa RFC, Nigeria)
- Christian Ogar (Cowrie RFC, Nigeria)
- Nuhu Ibrahim (Barewa RFC, Kano)
- Sodiq Oduola (Cowrie RFC, Nigeria)
- Adesina Abdul (Racing RFC, Nigeria)
- Babatunde Adewale (Nigeria Police RFC, Nigeria)
- Remilekun Adebambo (Racing RFC, Nigeria)
- Monday Alex (Racing RFC, UK)
- Promise Anosike (Abia buffalos RFC, Nigeria)
- Ezekile Tom (Gosar RFC, Nigeria)
- Monday omoragieva (Racing RFC, Nigeria)
- Adebayo Tobi (Nigeria Police RFC, Nigeria)

Manager: Bronson Weir, Assistant Coach: Joseph Ofoha/Simon Joseph Team Doctor/Physio: Bukola Bojuwoye

=== Nigeria Squad for the 2023 World Cup Elimination Match versus Madagascar in Antananarivo, Madagascar - Dec 1 2019 ===
- Godwin Dina Otoro Jrn (Vice Captain), Italy - Captain
- Azeez Ladipo (Cowrie RFC, Nigeria) Vice Captain
- Sunday Bassey (Cowrie RFC, Nigeria)
- Ibrahim Suraj (Barewa RFC, Nigeria)
- John Kurah (Racing RFC, Nigeria)
- Onome Richard (Barewa RFC, Nigeria)
- Ricky Nwagbara (South Africa)
- Samuel Ekpo (Cowrie RFC, Nigeria)
- Olatunde Sulaimon (Cowrie RFC, Nigeria)
- Jude Abrakson (Barewa RFC, Nigeria)
- Emmanuel Chukwudi (Abia Buffalos, Nigeria)
- Joshua Etim (Barewa RFC, Nigeria)
- Christian Ogar (Cowrie RFC, Nigeria)
- Nuhu Ibrahim (Barewa RFC, Kano)
- Jeremiah Peters (Kings College Old Boys, Nigeria)
- Monday Alex (Racing RFC, UK)
- Daniel John (Cowrie RFC, Nigeria)
- Ezekile Tom (Gosar RFC, Nigeria)
- Monday omoragieva (Racing RFC, Nigeria)
- Gabriel Etim (Nigeria Police RFC, Nigeria)

Manager: Bronson Weir, Team Doctor/Physio: Bukola Bojuwoye

=== Current Squad ===
Nigeria Squad for the 2027 World Cup Elimination Match versus Tunisia and Ghana in Monastir, Tunisia - Dec 16th - 23rd 2024.

Player	Position	Date of birth (age)	Caps	Club/province
Oghenetejiri Ajuchi	Prop			(England) Barnes R.F.C.
Ford Oladele Ayodele	Prop			(England) Richmond RFC
Taiwo Olagunju	Prop			(United States) Dallas Men's Rugby
Quadri Kolawole	Prop			(Nigeria) Cowrie RFC
Sunday Bassey	Prop			(Nigeria) Cowrie RFC
Ibrahim Suraj	Hooker			(Nigeria) Barewa RFC
Julius Godwin	Hooker			(Nigeria) Barewa RFC
Iyintosofoluwa Kolawole	Prop			(Nigeria) Racing RFC
Babajide Tunde (Captain)	Lock			(England) Southend RFC
Arinze Okemuo	Lock			(Nigeria) RUMS RFC
Blaise Felix	Back row			(South Africa) Alberton Rugby Club
Akeem Yusuf	Back row			(Nigeria) Cowrie RFC
Frederick Henry-Ajudua	Back row			(United States) ATL OLD White RFC
Oluwadara Odunlami	Back row			(England) IBC
Liberty Enowa	Back row			(Nigeria) Delta State Rugby
Williams Tyover Malu	Back row			Nigeria Police Rugby
Jamiu Mohammed Ibrahim	Scrum-half			(Nigeria) Kwara Dynamite RFC
Isa Omale	Scrum-half			(Nigeria) Barewa RFC
Alex Onyeahasi	Fly-half			(England) Clifton RFC
Matthew Ilube	Fly-half			(England) Old Priorians RFC
Tuoyo Egodo	Centre			(England) Birmingham Moseley
Jonathan Ilori	Centre			(England) Esher RFC
Stephen Kiki Suru	Centre			(Nigeria) Eco II RFC
Isaiah Akpovwa	Wing			(England) Blackheath RFC
Aliu Auwal	Wing			(Nigeria) Edo State
Samuel Akpabio	Wing			(Nigeria) Barewa RFC
Christian Williams Friday	Fullback			(Nigeria) Barewa RFC
Monday Omorogieva	Fullback			(Nigeria) Racing RFC

Management

- Head Coach: Steve Lewis
- Assistant Coach: Vinny Barrington
- Doctor: Adebukola Bojuwoye
- Manager: Azeez Ladipo

== Record ==
Below is a table of the representative rugby matches played by a Nigeria national XV at test level up until 29 November 2025, updated after match with Ghana.

Opponent	Played	Won	Lost	Drawn	% Won
Benin	4	4	0	0	100%
Botswana	1	0	1	0	0%
Burkina Faso	2	1	1	0	50%
Cameroon	2	0	2	0	0%
Eswatini	1	1	0	0	100%
Ghana	8	5	2	1	62.5%
Ivory Coast	2	0	2	0	0%
Kenya	1	0	1	0	0%
Madagascar	1	0	1	0	0%
Mali	3	1	3	0	33.33%
Mauritius	4	2	2	0	50%
Morocco	2	0	2	0	0%
Niger	2	1	1	0	50%
Senegal	2	1	1	0	50%
Togo	4	3	0	1	75%
Tunisia	1	0	1	0	0%
Zambia	3	1	2	0	33.33%
Zimbabwe	1	0	1	0	0%
Zimbabwe A	1	1	0	0	100%
Total	45	21	22	2	46.67%

=== World Rugby Ranking ===
Nigeria were ranked 76th in the world by World Rugby as of 14 of July 2025. https://www.world.rugby/tournaments/rankings/mru

=== World Cup record ===
- 1987 (New Zealand) - No Qualifying Tournament Held
- 1991 (England)
- 1995 (South Africa)
- 2003 (Australia)
- 2007 (South Africa)
- 2011 (New Zealand)
- 2015 (England)
- 2019 (South Africa)
- 2023 (South Africa)

=== Nigeria Rugby Statistics as at December, 2014 ===
Games played	23
Games Won	8
Games Lost	13
Games Drawn	2
Longest Winning Streak	4
Longest Losing Streak	6
Teams Played	15
Teams Beaten	6
Teams Beaten By	11
Teams Drawn With	2
Grounds Played At	1
Largest Points For	61
Largest Points Against	111
Largest Winning Margin	51
Largest Losing Margin	-99
Total Points For	375
Avg Points For	16.3
Total Points Against	549
Avg Points Against	23.87
Total Points Difference	-174
Avg Points Difference	-7.57

== Nigerian players representing other nations ==
There have been a large number of Nigerian born or eligible players who have, for a variety of reasons, opted to play for another nation.

These include:

- Niyi Adeolokun - Ireland
- Ugo Monye - England
- Ayoola Erinle - England
- Topsy Ojo - England
- Mark Odejobi - England 7s
- Daniel Norton - England 7s
- Anthony Watson (rugby union) - England
- Marcus Watson (rugby union) - England 7s
- Steve Ojomoh - England
- Victor Ubogu - England
- Nanyak Dala - Canada
- Luther Obi - South Africa U20s
- Uche Odouza - England 7s
- Adedayo Adebayo - England
- Chris Oti - England
- Elijah Joseph - England
- Andrew Harriman - England
- Danny Hobbs-Awoyemi - England U20s
- Paolo Odogwu -England
- Beno Obano - England
- Maro Itoje - England
- Nick Isiekwe - England
- Joel Kpoku - England U20
- Andy Christie - Scotland
- Rotimi Segun - England U20
- Elliott Obatoyinbo - England U20
- Josh Ibuanokpe - England U20
- Nathan Earle - England
- Gabriel Ibitoye - England U20
- Gabriel Oghre - England U20
- Max Williams (rugby union) - Wales U20
- Cormac Izuchukwu - Ireland
- Edwin Edogbo - Ireland
- Sean Edogbo - Ireland U20
- Max Ojomoh - England
- David Odiase - Italy
- Sam Illo - Ireland U20
- Immanuel Feyi-Waboso - England

== See also ==
- Rugby union in Nigeria
- 2007 Rugby World Cup - Africa qualification
