= Morocco national rugby union team =

Morocco
- Nickname: Atlas Lions
- Union: Royal Moroccan Rugby Federation
- Head coach: Pierre Chadebech
- Captain: Houssine Arabat
| First colours | Second colours |

World Rugby ranking
- Current: 40 (as of 21 July 2025)

First international
- Morocco 6–14 Spain (25 December 1931)

Biggest win
- Morocco 77–3 Niger (23 June 2013)

Biggest defeat
- Morocco 0–89 Romania (17 November 1976)

The Morocco national rugby union team are a national sporting side, representing Morocco in rugby union. The team is also known as the Atlas Lions. Morocco is governed by the Fédération Royale Marocaine de Rugby. Morocco competes in the Africa Cup annually. The team has won the competition in 2003 and 2005. They usually play their internationals in Casablanca.

Morocco has thus far not qualified for a Rugby World Cup, but have participated in the qualifying tournaments since the early 1990s. For the 2007 Rugby World Cup tournament in France, Morocco failed to qualify when they lost to Portugal, home and away meaning they would not make the Repechage 1 play-off against Uruguay.

Their best ranking was 20th in the world (on 5 July 2004)

== History ==
Morocco played their first international match on 25 December 1931 in Rabat, which Spain won 14–6. Another match was held three days later, and Morocco managed to hold Spain to a 10-all draw. Morocco met Spain again in April of the next year, though this time in Madrid, losing 8–14. The two teams met again that December, Spain winning 14–0. After playing four internationals, no official matches would be played by Morocco until 1967.

Making their return to the international rugby stage, Morocco faced off against their old opponents of the 1930s – Spain, losing 3–0. Morocco then won their first match, at home in Casablanca, where they defeated Spain by one point. In late 1970, they were beaten by a non-cap French XV in Casablanca. The following year Morocco defeated Italy in Naples, and lost 25–0 to Romania at home, and in 1972, were defeated 73–6 by a non-cap French XV. In 1975 in Brussels they defeated Belgium. Morocco they found wins against teams like Italy and West Germany, and lost games to touring French sides, as well as teams like Romania. Morocco played a French XV in 1983 in Casablanca, losing 9–16.

Morocco entered the 1991 Rugby World Cup qualifyings, in a three games pool, in 1990, losing to Zimbabwe by 0–16, and to Tunisia by 12–16, finally winning their last fixture to Côte d'Ivoire by 11–4. Their qualifying competitions for the 1995 Rugby World Cup started in group 2 Africas, winning their first game over Tunisia by 6–5, in October 1993. They lost their second game to Côte d'Ivoire but did go through to round 2, where they lost to Côte d'Ivoire again, as well as Zimbabwe, and drew with Namibia.

Morocco were a part of Round 4 for the 1999 Rugby World Cup qualifying for Africas, again playing Namibia, Zimbabwe and Côte d'Ivoire. Morocco finished second in the round, behind Namibia, and went through to a repechage round. Uruguay won a home and away series. In 2000, Morocco were included in the inaugural European Nations Cup for Tier 2 rugby nations . They performed well and the highlight was when they defeated Romania 18–10 in Casablanca. In the same season, Morocco also played an under-23 Springboks side. In qualifying tournaments for the 2003 world cup, Morocco played in the six nation split third round, losing to Tunisia by one point and defeating Côte d'Ivoire. In February 2003, Morocco defeated France Amateurs 32–22 in Rabat.

Morocco's bid to qualify for the 2007 world cup in France kicked off in June 2006 in pool 2 of round 2 of the Africas qualifying tournament. They defeated Uganda 36–3 in their first match, and then drew Côte d'Ivoire 9–9. They then lost 25–7 in Windhoek and 8–27 in Casablanca to Namibia. Morocco advanced to the Repechage Round as Africa 2, to play Europe 4 – Portugal, who won the home and away series.

Morocco failed surprisingly the early stage of the 2011 Rugby World Cup qualifyings, after a 9–21 loss at home to Côte d'Ivoire.

After failing to field a team in the 2011 Africa Cup Division 1A, Morocco, along with Namibia were relegated to Division 1B for 2012. After losses to Madagascar and Senegal, Morocco were relegated to the Division 1C tournament for the 2013 Africa Cup, and as such, were eliminated from the 2015 Rugby World Cup.

== Record ==
Below is a table of the representative rugby matches played by a Morocco national XV at test level up until 19 July 2025, updated after match with Senegal.

| Opponent | Played | Won | Lost | Drawn | % Won |
|---|---|---|---|---|---|
| Algeria | 2 | 2 | 0 | 0 | 100% |
| Andorra | 2 | 2 | 0 | 0 | 100% |
| Belgium | 8 | 7 | 1 | 0 | 87.5% |
| Botswana | 1 | 1 | 0 | 0 | 100% |
| Cameroon | 3 | 3 | 0 | 0 | 100% |
| Croatia | 1 | 0 | 1 | 0 | 0% |
| Czechoslovakia | 5 | 2 | 3 | 0 | 40% |
| Czech Republic | 1 | 1 | 0 | 0 | 100% |
| Denmark | 1 | 1 | 0 | 0 | 100% |
| France A | 16 | 2 | 14 | 0 | 7.69% |
| Georgia | 1 | 0 | 1 | 0 | 0% |
| Germany | 3 | 2 | 1 | 0 | 66.67% |
| Italy | 8 | 2 | 6 | 0 | 25% |
| Ivory Coast | 15 | 11 | 3 | 1 | 73.33% |
| Kenya | 4 | 2 | 2 | 0 | 50% |
| Madagascar | 5 | 4 | 1 | 0 | 80% |
| Mauritius | 1 | 1 | 0 | 0 | 100% |
| Namibia | 8 | 2 | 5 | 1 | 25% |
| Netherlands | 7 | 4 | 3 | 0 | 57.14% |
| Niger | 1 | 1 | 0 | 0 | 100% |
| Nigeria | 2 | 2 | 0 | 0 | 100% |
| Poland | 13 | 2 | 11 | 0 | 15.38% |
| Portugal | 14 | 5 | 7 | 2 | 35.71% |
| Romania | 8 | 1 | 7 | 0 | 12.5% |
| Russia | 3 | 1 | 2 | 0 | 33.33% |
| Senegal | 2 | 0 | 2 | 0 | 0% |
| South Africa Amateurs | 3 | 0 | 3 | 0 | 0% |
| Soviet Union | 3 | 0 | 3 | 0 | 0% |
| Spain | 17 | 6 | 10 | 1 | 35.29% |
| Switzerland | 1 | 1 | 0 | 0 | 100% |
| Tunisia | 24 | 17 | 5 | 2 | 70.83% |
| Uganda | 4 | 3 | 1 | 0 | 75% |
| Uruguay | 2 | 1 | 1 | 0 | 50% |
| Yugoslavia | 2 | 2 | 0 | 0 | 100% |
| West Germany | 7 | 5 | 2 | 0 | 71.43% |
| Zambia | 1 | 1 | 0 | 0 | 100% |
| Zimbabwe | 5 | 1 | 3 | 1 | 20% |
| Total | 204 | 98 | 98 | 8 | 48.04% |

== Honours ==
=== Official competitions ===
Rugby Africa Cup

- Champions: 2003, 2005
- Runner-up: 2000, 2001, 2004

Second level

- (gold) Champions: 2017

Third level

- (gold) Champions: 2016
- (silver) Runner-up: 2013

North African Tri Nations

- (gold) Champions: 2016, 2017

Rugby Mediterranean Games

- (bronze) Third: 1979, 1983

Rugby Arab Cup (Men VII)

- (gold) Champions: 2015, 2016, 2017, 2024

Rugby Europe International Championships

- (bronze) Third: 1971, 1972, 2000

== See also ==
- Fédération Royale Marocaine de Rugby
- Rugby World Cup
