= Madagascar national rugby union team =

Madagascar
- Nickname: Les Makis
- Union: Fédération Malagasy de Rugby
- Head coach: Berthin Rafalimanana
- Captain: José Rakoto
- Most caps: Gabriel Rajaonarison
- Top scorer: José Rakoto
First colours

World Rugby ranking
- Current: 46 (as of 17 March 2025)
- Highest: 43 (2023)
- Lowest: 51 (23 November 2020)

First international
- Madagascar 9–17 Italy (Antananarivo, Madagascar; 24 May 1970)

Biggest win
- Madagascar 63–3 Nigeria (Antananarivo, Madagascar; 1 December 2019)

Biggest defeat
- Namibia 112–0 Madagascar (Windhoek, Namibia; 15 June 2002)

World Cup
- Appearances: 0

The Madagascar national rugby union team represents Madagascar in the sport of rugby union. Although rugby is popular in Madagascar, the country has not yet qualified for a Rugby World Cup. It does compete annually in the Africa Cup, and was runner-up to Uganda in 2007. The national team's nickname is the Malagasy name for the ring-tailed lemur.

Madagascar defeated Namibia 57 - 54 in extra-time to win Group 1B final match at the 2012 Africa Cup; they have now jumped up 14 places to their current 42nd rank.

== History ==
Madagascar played their first ever international rugby match in 1970, where they met Italy, losing 9 points to 17. The second of the series of two games was also won by Italy, 6 points to 9. The team got their first international win during 1987 when they defeated Kenya 22 to 16.

During 2001 Madagascar competed for the first time in the Africa qualification tournaments for the 2003 Rugby World Cup to be held in Australia. They started off in Pool B of Round 1, where they contested matches against Botswana and Swaziland. They won both their games and finished at the top of the pool to advance to the next round. In Round 2 they defeated Kenya and Cameroon to secure the top finish and advance to Round 3, which took place in 2002. Madagascar made their exit in Round 3, losing to Namibia and Zimbabwe.

Madagascar attempted to qualify for the 2007 Rugby World Cup in France. They started off in Pool 2 of Round 1b of the qualifying tournament, where they were grouped with Kenya and Uganda. After drawing with Kenya, they lost to Uganda and finished third in the standings. They were semi-finalists at the 2006 Africa Cup, and losing finalists in 2005 and 2007.

Madagascar also failed to qualify for the 2011 Rugby World Cup. It is currently involved in the 2015 Rugby World Cup qualifyings. Madagascar was the surprise winner of the 2012 Africa Cup, defeating Namibia 57–54 in an historical final. In 2013 the Makis avoided relegation from the top flight of African rugby and remain in Division 1A of the Africa Cup for 2014, which will serve as the African qualification for the 2015 Rugby World Cup.

Madagascar wins serendib cup 2013 in Sri Lanka, beating Sri Lanka on a score of 17-12 and dominating Poland on 25–21 score, José Rakoto won the player of the tournament.

== Squad ==
Madagascar squad for the 2014 Africa Cup.

Backs
| Player | Position | Club |
|---|---|---|
| Jacky Bayard | Scrum-half | (Madagascar) 3FB |
| Bienvenue Mananja Rasoa | Scrum-half | (Madagascar) IRC |
| José Rakoto (c) | Fly-half | (Madagascar) 3FB |
| Rakotoarivelo Benjaniaina | Fly-half | (Madagascar) TFMA |
| Rija Rakotoarimanana | Centre | (Madagascar) 3FB |
| Sidonie Rakotoarisoa | Centre | (Madagascar) 3FB |
| Randriananbinina Hajanirina | Centre | (Madagascar) 3FB |
| Rakotonirina Alain | Wing | (Madagascar) 3FB |
| Harinirina Jacquot | Wing | (Madagascar) TAM |
| Ralaimidona Hery | Wing | (Madagascar) 3FB |
| Razafindranaivo Bernard | Full-back | (Madagascar) COSFA |
| Rasoanaivo Herizo | Full-back | (Madagascar) 3FB |

Forwards
| Player | Position | Club |
|---|---|---|
| Rakotomialoha Donald | Hooker | (Madagascar) COSFA |
| Andrianjaka Christian | Hooker | (Madagascar) United States |
| Rakotoarivelo Hasina | Prop | (Madagascar) 3FB |
| Randriamanantena Rodolphe | Prop | (Madagascar) COSFA |
| Razafindratsimba Anthony | Prop | (Madagascar) 3FB |
| Rabemananjara Jean Willy | Prop | (Madagascar) UASC |
| Tolotra Ramaromiantso | Lock | (Madagascar) 3FB |
| Claudio Ravelonomenjanahary | Lock | (Madagascar) 3FB |
| Rakotonirina Jean de Dieu | Flanker | (Madagascar) UASC |
| Rabearilala Toussaint Boniface | Flanker | (Madagascar) IRC |
| Rakotoson Mampionona | Flanker | (Madagascar) United States |
| Ravelomanantsoa Tiana | Flanker | (Madagascar) TFMA |
| Rakotoarisoa Herizo | Number eight | (Madagascar) 3FB |

== Overall Record ==
Below is a table of the representative rugby matches played by a Madagascar national XV at test level up until 24 November 2024, updated after match with Morocco.

| Team | Mat | Won | Lost | Draw | % | For | Aga | Diff |
|---|---|---|---|---|---|---|---|---|
| Botswana | 5 | 5 | 0 | 0 | 100% | 223 | 86 | +137 |
| Cambodia | 2 | 2 | 0 | 0 | 100% | 63 | 31 | +32 |
| Eswatini | 1 | 1 | 0 | 0 | 100% | 26 | 21 | +5 |
| Italy | 2 | 0 | 2 | 0 | 0% | 15 | 26 | -11 |
| Ivory Coast | 4 | 4 | 0 | 0 | 100% | 116 | 80 | +36 |
| Kenya | 4 | 2 | 1 | 1 | 50% | 73 | 94 | -21 |
| Mauritius | 1 | 1 | 0 | 0 | 100% | 33 | 24 | +9 |
| Morocco | 5 | 1 | 4 | 0 | 20% | 147 | 243 | -96 |
| Namibia | 5 | 1 | 4 | 0 | 20% | 94 | 362 | -268 |
| Nigeria | 1 | 1 | 0 | 0 | 100% | 63 | 3 | +60 |
| Poland | 1 | 1 | 0 | 0 | 100% | 25 | 21 | +4 |
| Réunion | 5 | 4 | 1 | 0 | 80% | 159 | 118 | +39 |
| Senegal | 1 | 0 | 1 | 0 | 0% | 24 | 30 | -6 |
| South Africa Amateurs | 3 | 2 | 1 | 0 | 66.67% | 39 | 79 | -31 |
| Sri Lanka | 1 | 1 | 0 | 0 | 100% | 17 | 12 | +5 |
| Uganda | 7 | 2 | 5 | 0 | 28.57% | 173 | 236 | -63 |
| Zambia | 5 | 4 | 1 | 0 | 80% | 184 | 97 | +87 |
| Zimbabwe | 11 | 3 | 7 | 1 | 27.27% | 177 | 390 | -123 |
| Total | 64 | 35 | 27 | 2 | 54.69% | 1651 | 1953 | -302 |

== World Cup Record ==
| World Cup record | | | | | | | | World Cup Qualification record | | | | | |
| Year | Round | P | W | D | L | F | A | P | W | D | L | F | A |
|---|---|---|---|---|---|---|---|---|---|---|---|---|---|
| (Australia) (New Zealand) 1987 | Not invited | | | | | | | - | | | | | |
| (United Kingdom) (Republic of Ireland) (France) 1991 | Did not enter | | | | | | | Did not enter | | | | | |
| (South Africa) 1995 | Did not enter | | | | | | | Did not enter | | | | | |
| (Wales) 1999 | Did not enter | | | | | | | Did not enter | | | | | |
| (Australia) 2003 | Did not qualify | | | | | | | 6 | 4 | 0 | 2 | 117 | 240 |
| (France) 2007 | Did not qualify | | | | | | | 2 | 0 | 1 | 1 | 38 | 42 |
| (New Zealand) 2011 | Did not qualify | | | | | | | 2 | 1 | 0 | 1 | 67 | 47 |
| (England) 2015 | Did not qualify | | | | | | | 7 | 3 | 0 | 4 | 190 | 332 |
| (Japan) 2019 | Did not qualify | | | | | | | 3 | 1 | 0 | 2 | 81 | 102 |
| (France) 2023 | Did not qualify | | | | | | | 2 | 1 | 0 | 1 | 34 | 71 |
| (Australia) 2027 | Did not qualify | | | | | | | 2 | 1 | 0 | 1 | 70 | 60 |
| Total | 0/11 | - | - | - | - | - | - | 24 | 11 | 1 | 12 | 597 | 894 |

== See also ==
- Rugby union in Madagascar
- Madagascar national rugby sevens team
