= Uganda national rugby union team =

Uganda
- Nickname: Rugby Cranes
- Union: Uganda Rugby Union
- Head coach: Fred Mudoola
- Captain: Byron Oketayot
- Most caps: Micheal Okorach (54)
- Top scorer: Allan Musoke
- Home stadium: Legends Rugby Grounds / Kyadondo Rugby grounds / King's Park Arena, Namboole Stadium
First colours	Second colours

World Rugby ranking
- Current: 49 (as of 8 June 2026)
- Highest: 31 (2008)
- Lowest: 68 (2004)

First international
- Uganda 11–21 Kenya (24 May 1958)

Biggest win
- Uganda 100–0 Burundi (11 September 2003)

Biggest defeat
- South Africa Amateurs 98–10 Uganda (1 October 2005); Biggest defeat by full international Namibia 55–6 Uganda (16 June 2018)

World Cup
- Appearances: 0

The Uganda national rugby union team are a national sporting side of Uganda, representing them at rugby union. Rugby union was introduced by the British during colonial rule and Uganda played their first international game against Kenya in 1958. They have not yet qualified for the Rugby World Cup.

Uganda compete annually against Kenya in the Elgon Cup and the Africa Cup. The Rugby Cranes won the CAR in 2007.

== History ==
Uganda has a long history of rugby participation dating back to even before the first official rugby match was ever played in 1958. The Uganda Rugby Football Union (URFU) as it was known then was formed in 1955. There were no clubs formed at the time and games were frequently played between representative sides from Kenya and Tanganyika (Tanzania at the time) but most notably against the Royal Navy and some British and South African Universities.

In the early 1930s there was only one rugby club in Uganda called the "Uganda Rugby Football Club", which later became "Uganda Kobs Rugby Football Club" and then its name was changed to "Kampala Kobs Rugby Football Club". Most rugby games were played in Entebbe.

The East Africa team played some of the best sides in the world, including the British Lions in 1955, South Africa in 1961, and Wales in 1964. The three African Great Lakes countries of Kenya, Tanzania and Uganda have a long shared history of rugby. For much of their history, they have relied on each other for club, inter-district, inter-territorial and international matches, as well as combining their resources to create a regional squad called "the Tuskers".

The three East African countries, at the time, each had membership in the Rugby Football Union of East Africa (RFUEA), an umbrella union for the three nations both before and after they each achieved independence in the early 1960s. Until independence, each was regarded as a colonial possession of the British Empire rather than an independent nation.

The first official match between Uganda and Kenya took place in 1958 played in Kampala a game Uganda lost; Uganda scoring 11 points to 21 for Kenya. Uganda Rugby Union formally Uganda Rugby Football Union, become a World Rugby formally International Rugby Board affiliate in 1997 and now has a total rugby playing population of approximately 22,000.

With the formation of the Confederation of African Rugby (now known as Rugby Africa) in 2000, the Ugandan Rugby Union also became automatic full members. Uganda's biggest winning margin was to come in 2003 when Uganda beat Burundi 100-0. Uganda would later post its worst defeat in 2005 against South Africa; Uganda scored 10 points to 98 for South Africa XV.

== World Cup record ==
Year	Round	Position	GP	W	D	L	PF	PA
(New Zealand) (Australia) 1987	No qualifying tournament held							
(United Kingdom) (Republic of Ireland) (France) 1991 to (Wales) 1999	did not enter							
(Australia) 2003 to (Japan) 2019	did not qualify							
Total	0/9	-	-	-	-	-	-	-

== Current squad ==
Uganda 2022 Africa Cup squad

Akera Komaketch, Joseph Aredo, Arthur Mpande, Asuman Mugerwa, Aziku Robert, Tawfik Bagalana, Chissano Joachim, Emmanuel Ecodu, Emong Eliphaz, Paul Epilo, Thomas Gwokto, Juuko Jude, Kanyanya Ronald, Kato Reynolds, Khani Aziziz, Colin Kimbowa, Ivan Kirabo, Saul Kivumbi, Ivan Magomu (Captain), Manano Alhaji, James Mugisha, Jacob Ochen, Uhuru Charles, Timothy Oodongo, Faragi Odugo, Pius Ogena, Okia Solomon, George Scott Olwuoch, Michael Otto, Joseph Oyet, Alema Ruhweza, Lawrence Ssebuliba, Santos Ssenteza, Wanyama Conrad, Philip Wokorach

== Record ==
Below is a table of the representative rugby matches played by an Uganda national XV at test level up until 19 July 2025, updated after match with Ivory Coast.

Opponent	Played	Won	Lost	Drawn	% Won
Algeria	1	0	1	0	0%
Botswana	3	3	0	0	100%
Burkina Faso	1	1	0	0	100%
Cameroon	2	1	1	0	50%
Ghana	1	1	0	0	100%
Ivory Coast	6	4	2	0	66.67%
Kenya	42	12	28	2	28.57%
Kenya A	4	2	2	0	50%
Madagascar	7	5	2	0	71.43%
Mauritius	1	1	0	0	100%
Morocco	4	1	3	0	25%
Namibia	5	1	4	0	20%
Netherlands	1	0	1	0	0%
Senegal	4	3	1	0	75%
South Africa Amateurs	3	0	3	0	0%
Tunisia	6	4	2	0	66.67%
Zambia	5	5	0	0	100%
Zimbabwe	16	5	11	0	31.25%
Total	112	49	61	2	43.75%

== See also ==
- East Africa rugby union team
- Uganda national rugby sevens team
- Rugby union in Uganda
- Elgon Cup
