= Zambia national rugby union team =

Zambia
- Union: Zambia Rugby Football Union
- Head coach: Lawrence Njobvu
First colours

World Rugby ranking
- Current: 68 (as of 4 November 2024)
- Highest: 66 (23 November 2020)
- Lowest: 69 (16 January 2023)

First international
- East Africa 15 - 18 Zambia (1975-08-31)

Biggest win
- Zambia 107–9 Rwanda (Lusaka, Zambia; 9 September 2003)

Biggest defeat
- Ivory Coast 77–3 Zambia (Yamoussoukro, Côte d'Ivoire; 23 June 2013)

The Zambia national rugby union team is a third-tier rugby union side representing Zambia.

The first national Zambian side was put together in 1965 under Presidency of Dr K K Kaunda who was their first Patron. Jackie Kyle the Irish International was the President of the Union. Their first game was against a Combined Services side from the UK and Zambia won the game 56–9 in Kitwe. An invitational side toured Ireland in 1965 played 9 and won 7 - points for 115 against 92. Zambia captained by G Brooklyn played against the touring side Penguin's, formed with many outstanding players in the UK. Zambia lost all 3 games. They played the Penguin's again in 1972. They now compete on an annual basis in the Africa Cup. Rugby union in Zambia is administered by the Zambian Rugby Union. It was founded by Ian Kirkpatrick, formerly of the All Blacks, in the 1960s. Prior to 1964 Rugby was administered under the combined Rhodesian Rugby Union which included present day Zimbabwe and was affiliated to the South African Rugby Union with Rhodesia having the equivalent status of a provincial team in the South African provincial competitions.

Zambia competes in the Africa Rugby Cup. Zambia also competes in qualifying for the Rugby World Cup, although they have yet to qualify for the tournament.

== World Cup Record ==
Zambia were not invited to the original world cup in 1987 in New Zealand. They did not enter the first two tournaments that were open to qualification in 1991 and 1995. They first attempted to qualify for the 1999 Rugby World Cup. Between then and RWC 2011 qualification attempts have been very unsuccessful, with elimination coming in the 1st Round every time. The most successful attempt was for the RWC 2007 where they got through their group as winners only to be beaten by Senegal in a playoff for a place in Round 2.

=== Record ===
Below is a table of the representative rugby matches played by a Zambia national XV at test level up until 28 June 2026, updated after match with Namibia.

Nation	Games	Won	Lost	Drawn	Percentage of wins
Algeria	2	0	2	0	0%
Arabian Gulf	1	0	1	0	0%
Botswana	12	8	4	0	66.67%
Cameroon	3	1	2	0	33.33%
Eswatini	2	1	1	0	50%
Ghana	1	1	0	0	100%
Ivory Coast	3	0	3	0	0%
Kenya	8	1	7	0	12.5%
Madagascar	5	1	4	0	20%
Mauritius	3	1	2	0	33.33%
Morocco	1	0	1	0	0%
Namibia	3	0	3	0	0%
Niger	1	1	0	0	100%
Nigeria	3	2	1	0	66.67%
Rwanda	2	2	0	0	100%
Senegal	4	0	4	0	0%
Uganda	5	0	5	0	0%
Uganda A	1	1	0	0	100%
Zimbabwe	16	2	14	0	12.5%
Zimbabwe A	2	1	1	0	50%
Total	78	23	55	0	29.49%

=== Year-by-Year Record ===
- 1987: Not invited
- 1991: Did not enter
- 1995: Did not enter
- 1999: Did not qualify - Eliminated in 1st Round

Match Results					
Date	Home	Score	Away	Venue	Referee
26 April 1997	Zambia	30 - 44	Arabian Gulf	Luanshya, Zambia	N/A
17 May 1997	Botswana	13 - 20	Zambia	Gaborone, Botswana	N/A

- 2003: Did not qualify - Eliminated in 1st Round (Group A)

Match Results					
Date	Home	Score	Away	Venue	Referee
28 July 2001	Zambia	25 - 24	Cameroon	Chingola, Zambia	N/A
11 August 2001	Uganda	21 - 12	Zambia	Kyadondo, Uganda	N/A

- 2007: Did not qualify - Eliminated in Round 1a Playoff

Round 1a: Southern Pool

Match Results					
Date	Home	Score	Away	Venue	Referee
12 March 2005	Eswatini	24 - 23	Zambia	Mbabane, Swaziland	N/A
9 April 2005	Zambia	28 - 24	Botswana	Lusaka, Zambia	N/A

Round 1a: Playoff

Match Results					
Date	Home	Score	Away	Venue	Referee
28 May 2005	Senegal	22 - 14	Zambia	Dakar, Senegal	N/A
4 June 2005	Zambia	6 - 13	Senegal	Lusaka, Zambia	N/A

- 2011 - Did not qualify - Eliminated in 1st Round (Group B)

Match Results					
Date	Home	Score	Away	Venue	Referee
14 June 2008	Zambia	18 - 29	Morocco	Lusaka, Zambia	N/A
12 July 2008	Ivory Coast	32 - 9	Zambia	Abidjan, Côte d'Ivoire	N/A

- 2015 - Did not qualify - Eliminated in 1st Round (2012 CAR Africa Cup Division 1B)

Match Results					
Date	Home	Score	Away	Venue	Referee
22 July 2012	Botswana	23 - 15	Zambia	Gaborone, Botswana	N/A
28 July 2012	Ivory Coast	24 - 18	Zambia	Gaborone, Botswana	N/A

== See also ==
- Rugby union in Zambia
