= South Africa amateur national rugby union team =

South Africa Amateurs
- Union: South African Rugby Union
- Nickname(s): Springboks, Springbokke, Amabokoboko
- Emblem(s): the Springbok and the Protea
1st kit	2nd kit

The South Africa Amateurs are the amateur national rugby union team of South Africa. They played in the Africa Cup until 2007.
