= Ivory Coast national rugby union team =

National rugby union team of Ivory Coast

Ivory Coast
- Nickname: Les Éléphants (The Elephants)
- Emblem: Elephant
- Union: Ivorian Rugby Federation
- Head coach: Edgar Babou
- Captain: TBD
- Home stadium: Various
First colours

World Rugby ranking
- Current: 69 (as of 8 June 2026)
- Highest: 38 (2003, 2005, 2006, 2021)
- Lowest: 69 (2026)

First international
- Zimbabwe 22–9 Ivory Coast (Harare, Zimbabwe; 5 May 1990)

Biggest win
- Ivory Coast 83–3 Mauritius (Yamoussoukro, Ivory Coast; 26 June 2013)

Biggest defeat
- Scotland 89–0 Ivory Coast (Rustenburg, South Africa; 26 May 1995)

World Cup
- Appearances: 1 (first in 1995)
- Best result: Pool stage (1995)

The Ivory Coast national rugby union team, nicknamed Les Éléphants, participates in the annual Africa Cup and are considered a third tier rugby team.

Formed in 1990, the team's most significant achievement to date was their success in qualifying for the Rugby World Cup for their first and so far only time in 1995. They have not qualified since, though they did reach the semi-finals of the African qualifying competition for the 2011 Rugby World Cup, achieving a home draw against eventual qualifiers Namibia before being defeated in their away match.

Rugby union in Côte d'Ivoire is popular among school children, but the rugby union playing population in Côte d'Ivoire is still relatively small with only 14 clubs and 470 registered senior players.

The national side is ranked 69th in the world (as of 8 June 2026).

== History ==
The Fédération Ivoirienne de Rugby, the national rugby union federation, was formed in March 1990, the same month that it joined the International Rugby Board. They qualified for the World Cup the first time in 1995 and suffered defeats by Scotland, France and Tonga.

With a small player base, and starved of strong competition, the team has deteriorated in recent years. Recent defeats to Morocco mean they are ranked below the North African side. Their record in the World Cup has been poor, and they have not managed a win. Their record defeat, 89–0 against Scotland in the 1995 tournament, led to some questioning the presence of the minor teams at the tournament. Ivory Coast, however, played much better in the following match, losing to France by 54–18, with 2 tries scored. The final match with Tonga, lost by 29–11, in the 1995 World Cup saw a major tragedy, as Max Brito suffered a cervical spine injury that left him a quadriplegic.

After the 1995 Rugby World Cup, Ivory Coast took a three years break from international competition, only returning for the 1999 Rugby World Cup qualifyings, in September 1998. Ivory Coast was very unfortunate, losing all the three matches, to Namibia (10–22), Zimbabwe (0–32), and Morocco (3–6), in a tournament held in Casablanca, Morocco.

After another hiatus of two years and a half, the Elephants returned for the Africa Championship, in 2001, losing both matches with Morocco, 11–18 at home and 18–20 away, and achieving an 11–11 draw with Tunisia, abroad, and a 46–0 win at home.

Ivory Coast missed the 2003 Rugby World Cup qualification, after losses to Tunisia (8–13) and Morocco (21–23). In the 2007 Rugby World Cup qualifyings, they started promisingly with two wins with Senegal (20–6) and Zimbabwe (33–3), but had mixed results with Morocco, a 9–9 draw at home and a 7–23 loss abroad, and Uganda, with a 7–32 loss abroad and an 18–9 win at home, and were subsequently eliminated.

The Ivorians advanced of the semi-final stage of the 2011 Rugby World Cup qualifiers, after a 21–9 win over Morocco, in Casablanca. They faced Namibia afterwards, reaching a 13–13 draw at Abidjan, but losing by 14–54 in Windhoek, being unable to qualify once again.

In the 2015 World Cup qualifying campaign the Ivory Coast were eliminated at the group stage after coming second in a five team group. Each team only played two matches so despite winning both their matches they finished behind Botswana who also won both their matches.

== Results summary ==
The Ivory Coast national team at the Stade Felix Houphouet-Boigny before their CAN Rugby World Cup 2011 qualifier vs. Zambia on 21 July 2008. Ivory Coast went on to win 32-9.

Below is a table of the representative rugby matches played by an Ivory Coast national XV at test level up until 3 December 2025, updated after match with Ghana.

| Team | Mat | Won | Lost | Draw | Win% | For | Aga | Diff |
|---|---|---|---|---|---|---|---|---|
| Algeria | 4 | 0 | 4 | 0 | 0% | 49 | 121 | -72 |
| Botswana | 2 | 2 | 0 | 0 | 100% | 78 | 38 | +40 |
| Burkina Faso | 3 | 3 | 0 | 0 | 100% | 96 | 30 | +66 |
| Cameroon | 1 | 1 | 0 | 0 | 100% | 17 | 10 | +7 |
| France | 1 | 0 | 1 | 0 | 0% | 18 | 54 | -36 |
| Ghana | 3 | 2 | 1 | 0 | 66.67% | 53 | 51 | +2 |
| Kenya | 1 | 0 | 1 | 0 | 0% | 17 | 20 | -3 |
| Madagascar | 4 | 0 | 4 | 0 | 0% | 54 | 86 | -32 |
| Mali | 1 | 1 | 0 | 0 | 100% | 49 | 0 | +49 |
| Mauritius | 1 | 1 | 0 | 0 | 100% | 83 | 3 | +80 |
| Morocco | 15 | 3 | 11 | 1 | 20% | 167 | 251 | -84 |
| Namibia | 5 | 2 | 2 | 1 | 40% | 74 | 114 | -40 |
| Nigeria | 2 | 2 | 0 | 0 | 100% | 44 | 31 | +13 |
| Rwanda | 1 | 1 | 0 | 0 | 100% | 60 | 3 | +57 |
| Scotland | 1 | 0 | 1 | 0 | 0% | 0 | 89 | -89 |
| Senegal | 11 | 6 | 5 | 0 | 54.55% | 160 | 192 | -32 |
| Switzerland | 2 | 0 | 1 | 1 | 0% | 33 | 36 | -3 |
| Tonga | 1 | 0 | 1 | 0 | 0% | 11 | 29 | -18 |
| Tunisia | 10 | 5 | 4 | 1 | 50% | 148 | 151 | -3 |
| Uganda | 6 | 2 | 4 | 0 | 33.33% | 92 | 153 | -61 |
| Zambia | 3 | 3 | 0 | 0 | 100% | 133 | 30 | +103 |
| Zimbabwe | 5 | 2 | 3 | 0 | 40% | 70 | 105 | -35 |
| Total | 83 | 36 | 43 | 4 | 43.37% | 1442 | 1552 | -110 |

== World Cup record ==
| Rugby World Cup record | | | | | | | | | Qualification | | | | | | |
| Year | Round | Pld | W | D | L | PF | PA | Squad | Pos | Pld | W | D | L | PF | PA |
|---|---|---|---|---|---|---|---|---|---|---|---|---|---|---|---|
| (New Zealand) (Australia) 1987 | Not invited | | | | | | | | Not invited | | | | | | |
| (England) (France) (Ireland) (Scotland) (Wales) 1991 | Did not qualify | | | | | | | | 4th | 3 | 0 | 0 | 3 | 20 | 45 |
| (South Africa) 1995 | Pool stage | 3 | 0 | 0 | 3 | 29 | 172 | Squad | 1st | 5 | 4 | 0 | 1 | 83 | 58 |
| (Wales) 1999 | Did not qualify | | | | | | | | 4th | 3 | 0 | 0 | 3 | 29 | 33 |
| (Australia) 2003 | Did not qualify | | | | | | | | 3rd | 2 | 0 | 0 | 2 | 100 | 54 |
| (France) 2007 | Did not qualify | | | | | | | | 2nd | 6 | 3 | 1 | 2 | 94 | 80 |
| (New Zealand) 2011 | Did not qualify | | | | | | | | P/O | 4 | 2 | 1 | 1 | 80 | 85 |
| (England) 2015 | Did not qualify | | | | | | | | 2nd | 2 | 2 | 0 | 0 | 53 | 35 |
| (Japan) 2019 | Did not qualify | | | | | | | | P/O | 4 | 2 | 0 | 2 | 86 | 96 |
| (France) 2023 | Did not qualify | | | | | | | | P/O | 3 | 1 | 0 | 2 | 54 | 75 |
| (Australia) 2027 | Did not qualify | | | | | | | | P/O | 4 | 1 | 0 | 3 | 49 | 108 |
| (United States) 2031 | To be determined | | | | | | | | To be determined | | | | | | |
| Total | — | 3 | 0 | 0 | 3 | 29 | 172 | — | — | 36 | 15 | 2 | 19 | 561 | 678 |
Champions; Runners–up; Third place; Fourth place; Home venue

== See also ==
- Fédération Ivoirienne de Rugby
- Rugby union in Ivory Coast
- Ivory Coast at the Rugby World Cup
