= Ivory Coast at the Rugby World Cup =

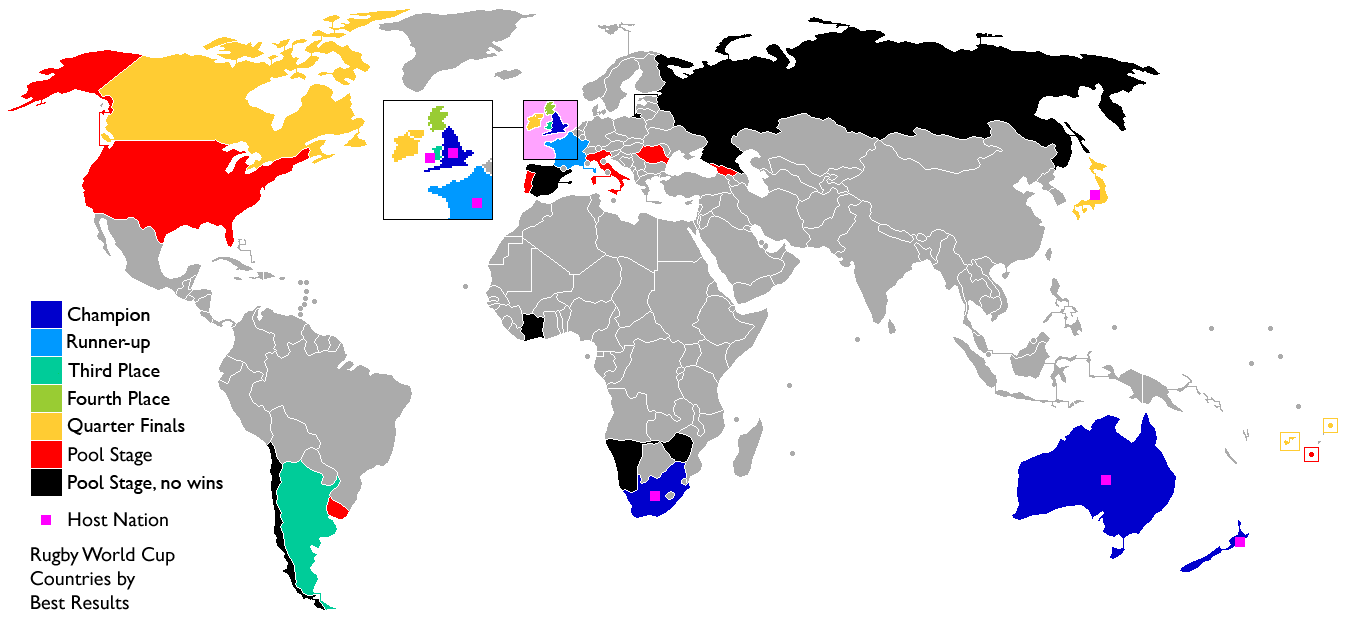
Map of nations' best results, excluding nations which unsuccessfully participated in qualifying tournaments.

The Ivory Coast's only Rugby World Cup appearance was in 1995 when they were placed in Pool D with France, Scotland, and Tonga.

Their appearance in the 1995 Rugby World Cup was fairly notorious and controversial. In the opening game against Scotland, the Ivory Coast lost by 89 points to nil, a result which led many to question the inclusion of "minor" teams in the tournament. Worse still, three minutes into the third match, against Tonga, their winger Max Brito was crushed beneath several other players. Despite intensive care, Brito was left paralyzed below the neck. He had caught a high ball that had been kicked up the field, and set off on a counter-attack. He was tackled by Inoke Afeaki, the Tonga flanker, before a ruck formed over him. The ruck collapsed and several players fell on top of Brito, leaving him prone and motionless on the ground. Brito was taken to the intensive care unit of the Unitas Hospital in Pretoria with broken vertebrae. Operations were carried out to stabilize the fourth and fifth vertebrae, but Brito was left paralyzed below the neck.

In a 2007 interview, Brito was portrayed as living an unhappy life. He was quoted as saying that

...It is now 12 years since I have been in this state. I have come to the end of my tether... If one day I fall seriously ill, and if I have the strength and courage to take my own life, then I will do it...This bloody handicap - it's my curse. It kills me and I will never accept it. I can't live with it and it's going to be with me for the rest of my life."

Brito's injury raised concerns about the presence of such teams in a rugby union environment on the brink of professionalisation.

== By position ==
Rugby World Cup record										Qualification						
Year	Round	Pld	W	D	L	PF	PA	Squad	Head coach	Pos	Pld	W	D	L	PF	PA
(New Zealand) (Australia) 1987	Not invited									Not invited						
(England) (France) (Ireland) (Scotland) (Wales) 1991	Did not qualify									4th	3	0	0	3	20	45
(South Africa) 1995	Pool stage	3	0	0	3	29	172	Squad	C. Ezoua	1st	5	4	0	1	83	58
(Wales) 1999	Did not qualify									4th	3	0	0	3	29	33
(Australia) 2003	Did not qualify									3rd	2	0	0	2	100	54
(France) 2007	Did not qualify									2nd	6	3	1	2	94	80
(New Zealand) 2011	Did not qualify									P/O	4	2	1	1	80	85
(England) 2015	Did not qualify									2nd	2	2	0	0	53	35
(Japan) 2019	Did not qualify									P/O	4	2	0	2	86	96
(France) 2023	Did not qualify									P/O	3	1	0	2	54	75
(Australia) 2027	To be determined									To be determined						
(United States) 2031	To be determined									To be determined						
Total	—	3	0	0	3	29	172	—	—	—	32	14	2	13	512	570
Champions; Runners–up; Third place; Fourth place; Home venue

== Overall record ==
Country	Pld	W	D	L	F	A	+/−	%
Tonga	1	—	—	1	11	29	-18	0
France	1	—	—	1	18	54	-36	0
Scotland	1	—	—	1	0	89	-89	0
Total	3	—	—	3	29	172	-143	0

=== 1995 Rugby World Cup ===
Pool D matches -

Team	Pld	W	D	L	PF	PA	PD	Pts
France	3	3	0	0	114	47	+67	9
Scotland	3	2	0	1	149	27	+122	7
Tonga	3	1	0	2	44	90	−46	5
Ivory Coast	3	0	0	3	29	172	−143	3

26 May 1995

Ivory Coast	0–89	Scotland
		Tries: G. Hastings (4), Logan (2), Walton (2), Wright, Chalmers, Stanger, Burnell, Shiel; Con: G. Hastings (9); Pen: G. Hastings (2)

Olympia Park, Rustenburg
Attendance: 20,000
Referee: Felise Vito (Western Samoa)

30 May 1995

France	54–18	Ivory Coast
Tries: Lacroix (2), Benazzi, Téchoueyres, Viars, Accoceberry, Saint-André, Costes; Con: Deylaud (2), Lacroix (2); Pen: Lacroix (2)		Tries: Soulama, Camara; Con: Kouassi; Pen: Kouassi (2)

Olympia Park, Rustenburg
Attendance: 17,000
Referee: Han Moon-soo (South Korea)

3 June 1995

Ivory Coast	11–29	Tonga
Tries: Okou; Pen: Dali (2)		Tries: 'Otai, Tu'ipulotu, Latukefu; Con: Tu'ipulotu (3); Pen: Tu'ipulotu

Olympia Park, Rustenburg
Attendance: 16,000
Referee: Don Reordan (United States)

- Ivory Coast player Max Brito was left a quadriplegic after suffering a cervical spine injury in this match.

== Team records ==
Highest team score

- 18 vs France 1995
- 11 vs Tonga 1995

Biggest score against

- 89 vs Scotland 1995
- 54 vs France 1995
- 29 vs Tonga 1995

Worst losing margin

- 89 vs Scotland 1995
- 36 vs France 1995
- 18 vs Tonga 1995

== Individual records ==
Most points

- 8 Victor Kouassi
- 6 Athanase Dali
- 5 Soumaila Okou
- 5 Aboubakar Camara
- 5 Soulama

Most points in a game

- 8 Victor Kouassi vs France
- 6 Athanase Dali vs Tonga
- 5 Soumaila Okou vs Tonga
- 5 Aboubakar Camara vs France
- 5 Soulama vs France

Most tries

- 1 Soulama
- 1 Aboubakar Camara
- 1 Soumaila Okou
