= Rugby union in Ivory Coast =

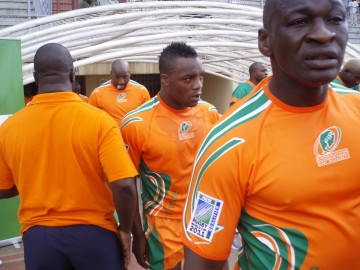
- The national team.
- Country: Ivory Coast
- Governing body: Fédération Ivoirienne de Rugby
- National team: Ivory Coast
- Nicknames: The Elephants (French: Les éléphants)
- First played: 1946
- Registered players: 5,383
- Clubs: 14

National competitions
- Rugby World Cup; Rugby World Cup Sevens; IRB Sevens World Series

Rugby union in Ivory Coast is essentially amateur, with some degree of semi-professionalization in its top-flight league and the national rugby union team.

The sport is popular among school children, but the rugby union playing population in Ivory Coast is still relatively small with only 14 clubs. There are around 5,383 registered players, and the game takes in people from all walks of life. As of 22 June 2014, the men's national side are ranked 47th in the world.

== Governing body ==
Rugby union in the Ivory Coast is administered by the Fédération Ivoirienne de Rugby. It was founded in 1961 and became affiliated to the International Rugby Board in 1988.

== History ==
The sport is mainly played in and around the former capital Abidjan.

The first recorded game in the Ivory Coast was just after the Second World War, in 1946, when Mme Andre Benois organised a match between two teams of expatriates. They used an improvised ball made from the inner tube of a tyre.

The game was further developed by French schoolmasters working in the country.

As a former French colony, the country has tended to come under the French sphere of influence, and many top players, including Max Brito played in France. Although the origins of Ivorian rugby go back to the 1960s and earlier, real growth came about when the paid French official Jean-François Turon managed to get the game adopted by Abidjan University at the turn of the 1980s, but it is François Dali who is seen as the father of Ivorian rugby, and his son, Athanase Dali, was the national captain during the 1990s.

Ivorian delegates were amongst those who went to the centenary congress of the International Rugby Football Board in 1986.

Ivory Coast is a founding member of the Confederation of African Rugby (CAR), which was launched officially in January 1986, in Tunis, Tunisia. Rugby officials from Tunisia, Morocco, Senegal, Tanzania, Kenya, the Seychelles and Madagascar also attended.

== National team ==
The Ivory Coast national rugby union team, nicknamed ‘The Elephants’ (French: Les éléphants), is a third-tier rugby union side representing the Ivory Coast. The national team is a relatively recent creation. It was not even in existence when the first (invitation only) Rugby World Cup was played in 1987. They played their first international in 1990 against Zimbabwe. Their presence at the 1995 Rugby World Cup wasn't particularly memorable, with an 89–0 loss to Scotland in the opening match, a worthy performance to France in their 54–18 loss, in a game where the Ivorians managed to score two tries, and a 29–11 final defeat by Tonga. The Ivory Coast came close to qualifying for the 2011 Rugby World Cup, but were eliminated by Namibia.

=== 1995 World Cup ===
The Ivory Coast's first—and thus far only—appearance at the Rugby World Cup was in 1995. Namibia, a former South African territory, had narrowly missed out on qualifying for the World Cup because they had rested a number of key players in the qualifying rounds. Ivory Coast slipped past them, as well as past Zimbabwe and the third African favourite Morocco.

Ivory Coast went into the World Cup optimistic, with coach Claude Ezoua quoted as saying: "We want to prove to the world that there is more to African rugby than just South Africa." Although Namibia and Zimbabwe had qualified for the RWC at different times, both of these countries were firmly within the South African orbit, and had mostly white players who spoke English and/or Afrikaans. The Ivory Coast, on the other hand, was in West Africa and was French- rather than English-speaking. Moreover, as none of its players was white, their success has been seen by many as a positive sign that black Africa was emerging as a force in world rugby.

The composition of the World Cup squad also revealed interesting things about Ivorian rugby. 25 out of 26 were Ivorian-born (the exception being Max Brito, who was born in Senegal); half the squad was based and played in France; and many of the players were originally from Abidjan's harbour district. At this point, eight of the country's ten senior clubs were based in the capital. As an incentive, many of them had been paid the equivalent of £1.25 to turn up to training.

Once in the World Cup, the Ivory Coast's fortunes waned. Captain Athanase Dali was injured playing against Scotland who won 89–0, and fearless tackler Max Brito suffered a spinal injury when he went for a Tongan.

=== Since 1995 ===
Ivory Coast compete for the Africa Cup, but have never ranked high in the competition for it. As the result of its 2013 Africa Cup performance, in which Les Éléphants defeated Zambia, Mauritius and Morocco, Ivory Coast were promoted from Division 1C to Division 1B of the competition.

== See also ==
- Aboubakar Camara
- Athanase Dali
- Pépito Elhorga
- Ismaila Lassissi
