= 2023 Rugby World Cup – Africa qualification =

International rugby union competition Africa

Tournament details
- Dates: 5 June 2021 – 10 July 2022
- No. of nations: 14

21st Africa Cup

The 2021–22 Rugby Africa Cup, which doubled as Qualifying for the 2023 Rugby World Cup for Africa began in June 2021, where teams competed for one direct qualification spot into the final World Cup tournament and for one place in the final Qualification Tournament.

== Format ==
The World Cup qualification process doubled as a new two-year format for the Rugby Africa Cup.

Qualifying began with a round robin repechage tournament between Burkina Faso, Cameroon, and Burundi (the three lowest ranked teams at the time in Africa). The winner of this tournament advanced to the next round - Africa Cup 2021.

The second stage saw the remaining 12 teams divided into 4 groups of 3 where they played a single round-robin tournament to decide the pool winners. The top-2 teams after this round then progressed to the final stage of the African Qualification process, with seeding determining who played who in a knock-out competition in 2022.

Round 3 saw a phased knock-out competition; consisting of 4 quarter-finals, 2 semi-finals and a final, with the winner of the final qualifying as Africa 1. The runner-up advanced to the final Qualification Tournament as Africa 2.

== Entrants ==
Fourteen participants entered the Africa qualifiers in a bid to join South Africa (already qualified due to top 3 finish in the pool stages in 2019) at the 2023 Rugby World Cup. Three teams begin play in Round 1, with eleven more in Round 2. The same seeding from the cancelled 2019–20 Rugby Africa Cup is used for the group stage. Team World rankings taken prior to first Africa qualifying match.

Teams in bold have previously competed in a Rugby World Cup.

Nation	Rank	Began play	Qualifying status
Algeria	N/A	14 July 2021	Eliminated by Kenya on 6 July 2022
Burkina Faso	N/A	5 June 2021	Eliminated by Namibia on 1 July 2022
Burundi	N/A	5 June 2021	Eliminated by Cameroon on 9 June 2021
Cameroon	101	5 June 2021	Eliminated by Burkina Faso on 13 June 2021
Ghana	87	10 July 2021	Eliminated by Algeria on 18 July 2021
**Ivory Coast**	42	3 July 2021	Eliminated by Zimbabwe on 1 July 2022
Kenya	32	3 July 2021	Advances to Final Qualification Tournament as Africa 2 on 10 July 2022
Madagascar	51	1 July 2021	Eliminated by points difference on 11 July 2021
**Namibia**	24	7 July 2021	Qualified as Africa 1 on 10 July 2022
Senegal	54	3 July 2021	Eliminated by Algeria on 2 July 2022
**South Africa**	1	N/A	Qualified with Top 12 finish at 2019 World Cup
Tunisia	39	10 July 2021	Withdrew from qualification tournament on 8 July 2021
Uganda	40	10 July 2021	Eliminated by Kenya on 2 July 2022
Zambia	66	7 July 2021	Eliminated by Kenya on 11 July 2021
**Zimbabwe**	35	18 July 2021	Eliminated by Namibia on 6 July 2022

== Round 1: Rugby Africa Cup Repechage ==
The first round was a round-robin tournament held from 5–13 June 2021 in Ouagadougou, Burkina Faso.

Advanced to Round 2

Rank	Team	Games				Points			Bonus Points	Table Points
Rank	Team	Played	Won	Drawn	Lost	For	Against	Diff	Bonus Points	Table Points
1	Burkina Faso	2	2	0	0	69	16	+53	1	9
2	Cameroon	2	1	0	1	94	20	+74	2	6
3	Burundi	2	0	0	2	6	133	-127	0	0
Points were awarded to the teams as follows: Win - 4 points Draw - 1 points 4 or more tries - 1 point Loss within 7 points - 1 point Loss greater than 7 points - 0 points

5 June 2021
16:00

(1 BP) Burkina Faso	52–3	Burundi
Try: Kassoum Deme 1' m Antoine Yameogo 26' c Ali Papi Traore (2) 33' c, 38' m Ousmane Tioro (2) 45' m, 67' m Anourou Bance 49' m Maraoubil Sale 58' c Con: Kassoum Deme (3/7) 27', 34', 58'; Pen: Kassoum Deme (2/3) 14', 24'	RA Report; WR Report; Match details	Pen: Didier Iradukunda (1/1) 72'

Stade du 4 Août, Ouagadougou
Attendance: 0
Referee: Emmanuel Mane Sylvain (Senegal)

9 June 2021
16:00

Burundi	3–81	Cameroon (1 BP)
Pen: Didier Iradukunda (1/4) 37'; Cards: Helvé Hasabumutima (yellow card) 70'	RA Report; WR Report; Match details	Try: Noël Gaël Touko (2) 10' c, 17' m Gervais Mbassa (2) 27' m, 61' c Moctar Nsangou Hassan (3) 33' c, 38' c, 70' m Cédric Wembe Moteyo 40+1' c Bernard Mengue 43' c Moïse Chimi Tchekouo 44' m Steve Gérard Nekongo 58' c Josué Essome Makongo 63' m Ongoudou Amougou 79' c Con: Noël Gaël Touko (7/12) 11', 34', 39', 40+2', 43', 62', 79'; Moïse Chimi Tchekouo (1/1) 59'; Cards: Cédric Wembe Moteyo (yellow card) 36'; Robin Yantcha (yellow card) 46'; Bernard Mengue (yellow card) 73'

Stade du 4 Août, Ouagadougou
Attendance: 500
Referee: Jiriji Aymen (Tunisia)

13 June 2021
16:00

Burkina Faso	17–13	Cameroon (1 BP)
Try: Ali Papi Traore 12' m Ousmane Tioro 44' c Cheick Abasse Sawadogo 61' m Con: Adama Deme (1/3) 44'	RA Report; WR Report; Match details	Try: Cédric Wembe Moteyo 50' c Con: Noël Gaël Touko (1/1) 50'; Pen: Noël Gaël Touko (2/3) 26', 70'; Cards: Moctar Nsangou Hassan (yellow card) 21'; Moïse Chimi Tchekouo (yellow card) 59'

Stade du 4 Août, Ouagadougou
Attendance: 1,500
Referee: Saudah Adiru (Uganda)

== Round 2: 2021 Africa Cup ==
Round 2 consisted of four pools of three teams, competing from 1–18 July 2021. The top two teams in each pool advanced to Round 3.

=== Pool A ===
Originally, this pool was meant be hosted by Namibia at the Hage Geingob Rugby Stadium in Windhoek. However, due to restrictions in Namibia, Rugby Africa moved the location of this pool to the Ivory Coast.

Advance to Round 3

Rank	Team	Games				Points			Bonus Points	Table Points
Rank	Team	Played	Won	Drawn	Lost	For	Against	Diff	Bonus Points	Table Points
1	Namibia	2	1	0	1	65	34	+31	1	5
2	Ivory Coast	2	1	0	1	43	37	+6	1	5
3	Madagascar	2	1	0	1	34	71	-37	0	4
Points were awarded to the teams as follows: Win - 4 points Draw - 1 points At least 3 more tries than opponent - 1 point Loss within 7 points - 1 point Loss greater than 7 points - 0 points

3 July 2021
18:00

Ivory Coast	24–13	Namibia
Try: Bakary Meité 5' c Paul Diallo Dit Peres 11' c Penalty try 44'; Con: Ezer Kosse (2/2) 6', 12'; Pen: Ezer Kosse (1/1) 25'	RA Report; WR Report; Match details	Try: Obert Nortjé 32' m Lesley Klim 70' m Pen: TC Kisting (1/1) 19'; Cards: Max Katjijeko (yellow card) 44'

Stade Excellence Alassane Ouattara, Grand-Bassam
Attendance: 1,000
Referee: Heykel Bahroun (Tunisia)

7 July 2021
18:00

Madagascar	10–52	Namibia (1 BP)
Try: Julio Mahavy 48' c Con: Rakotomanalina Hery (1/1) 49'; Pen: Robel Rasoloniaina (1/1) 76'	RA Report; WR Report; Match details	Try: Adriaan Booysen 13' m Riaan van Zyl 20' c Johann Tromp 32' c Obert Nortjé (2) 44' m, 65' m TC Kisting 52' c Gerhard Thirion 80' c Con: TC Kisting (3/5) 21', 32', 80'; Ricardo Swartz (1/2) 52'; Pen: TC Kisting (3/3) 10', 36', 74'

Stade Excellence Alassane Ouattara, Grand-Bassam
Attendance: 200
Referee: Precious Pazani (Zimbabwe)

11 July 2021
18:00

(1 BP) Ivory Coast	19–24	Madagascar
Try: Paul Diallo Dit Peres 45' m Mickael Rabetsara 80' m Pen: Ezer Kosse (3/3) 6', 13', 18'	WR Report; Match details	Try: Tinella Rabemananjara 30' c Tahina Ilda Ratsimandresy 40' c Robel Rasoloniaina (2) 55' c, 66' m Con: Robel Rasoloniaina (2/3) 31', 40'; Cards: Tahina Ilda Ratsimandresy (red card) 60'

Stade Excellence Alassane Ouattara, Grand-Bassam
Attendance: 1,300
Referee: Heykel Bahroun (Tunisia)

=== Pool B ===
All matches of Pool B was hosted in Nairobi, Kenya.

Advance to Round 3

Rank	Team	Games				Points			Bonus Points	Table Points
Rank	Team	Played	Won	Drawn	Lost	For	Against	Diff	Bonus Points	Table Points
1	Senegal	2	2	0	0	40	24	+16	0	8
2	Kenya	2	1	0	1	61	28	+33	2	6
3	Zambia	2	0	0	2	13	62	-49	0	0
Points were awarded to the teams as follows: Win - 4 points Draw - 1 points At least 3 more tries than opponent - 1 point Loss within 7 points - 1 point Loss greater than 7 points - 0 points

3 July 2021
16:00

(1 BP) Kenya	19–20	Senegal
Try: Darwin Mukidza 35' c Con: Jone Kubu (1/1) 36'; Pen: Jone Kubu (3/4) 8', 14', 59'; Drop: Jone Kubu (1/1) 67'; Cards: Davis Chenge (yellow card) 79'	RA Report; WR Report; Match details	Try: Demba Kane 44' c Georges Pompidou 80+2' c Con: Mamadou N'Diaye (1/1) 45'; Saibo Sakho (1/1) 80+3'; Pen: Mamadou N'Diaye (2/3) 26', 40'; Cards: Georges Pompidou (yellow card) 56'

Nyayo National Stadium, Nairobi
Attendance: 0
Referee: Saudah Adiru (Uganda)

7 July 2021
15:00

Senegal	20–5	Zambia
Try: Ousmane Soumah 21' c Mamadou N'Diaye 40' c Con: Mamadou N'Diaye (2/2) 22', 40'; Pen: Mamadou N'Diaye (2/3) 14', 34'	RA Report; WR Report; Match details	Try: Philip Kamanga 3' m

Nyayo National Stadium, Nairobi
Attendance: 0
Referee: Nicardo Pienaar (Namibia)

11 July 2021
16:00

(1 BP) Kenya	42–8	Zambia
Try: Davis Chenge 3' c Brian Tanga 19' m Jone Kubu (2) 30' c, 40' c Joshua Chisanga 43' m George Nyambua 66' m Con: Jone Kubu (1/3) 3'; Dominic Coulson (2/3) 32', 40'; Pen: Jone Kubu (1/1) 13'; Drop: Jone Kubu (1/1) 34'; Cards: Joshua Chisanga (yellow card) 27'	RA Report; WR Report; Match details	Try: Israel Kalumba 52' m Pen: Laston Mukosa (1/1) 22'; Cards: Fine Chinkumbe (yellow card) 71'

Nyayo National Stadium, Nairobi
Attendance: 0
Referee: Nicardo Pienaar (Namibia)

=== Pool C ===
All matches for Pool C was hosted in Kampala, Uganda.

Advance to Round 3

Rank	Team	Games				Points			Bonus Points	Table Points
Rank	Team	Played	Won	Drawn	Lost	For	Against	Diff	Bonus Points	Table Points
1	Uganda	2	1	0	1	69	34	+35	2	6
2	Algeria	2	1	0	1	42	38	+4	1	5
3	Ghana	2	1	0	1	34	73	-39	0	4
Points were awarded to the teams as follows: Win - 4 points Draw - 1 points At least 3 more tries than opponent - 1 point Loss within 7 points - 1 point Loss greater than 7 points - 0 points

10 July 2021
15:00

(1 BP) Uganda	53–12	Ghana
Try: Odugo Faragi 3' m Solomon Okia (2) 14' c, 57' c Brian Odongo 27' c Desire Ayera (2) 40+1' c, 68' m Aaron Ofoywroth 52' c Ronald Kanyanya 77' m Con: Adrian Kasito (5/7) 15', 28', 40+2', 53', 58'; Pen: Ivan Magomu (1/2) 9'	WR Report; Match details	Try: Myles Timothy Eli Scott 31' m Josiah Twum-Boafo 35' c Con: Kofi Appiah (1/1) 37'; Cards: Klugey Gideon (yellow card) 40'

Kyadondo Rugby Club, Kampala
Attendance: 0
Referee: Talend Gandiwa (Zimbabwe)

14 July 2021
15:00

Algeria (1 BP)	20–22	Ghana
Try: Maxim Meneghin 15' m Remi Kardon 34' m Benjamin Caminati 40' c Con: Mathieu Lorée (1/3) 40'; Pen: Mathieu Lorée (1/1) 19'; Cards: Yakine Djebbari (yellow card) 41'; Benjamin Caminat (yellow card) 62'	WR Report; Match details	Try: Penalty try 55'; Ansah Lesley (2) 73' m, 70' c Con: Kofi Appiah (1/2) 80'; Pen: Josiah Twum-Boafo (1/2) 30'; Cards: Klugey Gideon (yellow card) 59'

Kyadondo Rugby Club, Kampala
Attendance: 0
Referee: Saudah Adiru (Uganda)

18 July 2021
15:00

(1 BP) Uganda	16–22	Algeria
Try: Brian Odongo 21' m Adrian Kasito 32' m Pen: Ivan Magomu (1/1) 26'; Maxwell Ebonga (1/2) 59'; Cards: Asuman Mugerwa (yellow card) 49'	WR Report; Match details	Try: Djamel Ouchéne 16' c Nadir Megdoud 37' m Walid Batchali 55' c Con: Mathieu Lorée (2/3) 17', 55'; Pen: Mathieu Lorée (1/1) 3'; Cards: Nabil Djalout (yellow card) 44'

Kyadondo Rugby Club, Kampala
Attendance: 0
Referee: Victor Ojuku (Kenya)

=== Pool D ===
All matches of Pool D were due to be hosted in Monastir, Tunisia, however due to the escalating COVID-19 situation in Tunisia, the group was moved to Zimbabwe. At the same time, Tunisia also withdrew from the competition meaning Zimbabwe and Burkina Faso gained automatic progression to the next stage of the qualification process. A 2-game match up between the two sides confirmed seedings for the next stage.

Advance to Round 3

Rank	Team	Games				Points			Bonus Points	Table Points
Rank	Team	Played	Won	Drawn	Lost	For	Against	Diff	Bonus Points	Table Points
1	Zimbabwe	2	2	0	0	196	8	+188	2	10
2	Burkina Faso	2	0	0	2	8	196	-188	0	0
Points were awarded to the teams as follows: Win - 4 points Draw - 1 points At least 3 more tries than opponent - 1 point Loss within 7 points - 1 point Loss greater than 7 points - 0 points

18 July 2021
15:00

Burkina Faso	3–101	Zimbabwe (1 BP)
Pen: Kassoum Deme (1/1) 25'; Cards: Moussa Zagre (yellow card) 80'	WR Report; Match details	Try: Shingirai Katsvere 4' c Biselele Tshamala 8' m Keith Chiwara 15' c Cleopas Kundiona 21' c Matthew McNab (2) 33' c, 76' c Sebastian Roche 39' c Marcus Nel 40' c Shingi Katsvere 44' c Deanne Makonit 48' m Martin Mangongo 52' c Cleopas Kundiona 55' c Shayne Makombe 72' c Aiden Burnett 78' c Matthew Mandiona 80+4' c Con: Keith Chiwara (9/11) 5', 15', 22', 34', 39', 40', 45', 53', 56'; Dundlee White-Sharpley (4/4) 72', 77', 79', 80+5'; Cards: Tyran Fagan (yellow card) 64'

Old Georgians RFC, Harare
Attendance: 0
Referee: Sylvain Mane (Senegal)

22 July 2021
14:00

(1 BP) Zimbabwe	95–5	Burkina Faso
Try: Tonderai Chiwambutsa (2) 3' c, 56' c Matthew McNab (3) 10' c, 79' c, 80' c Takudzwa Chieza 19' m Brandon Mudzekenyedzi (4) 22' c, 29' m, 50' c, 60' c Aiden Burnett 38' c Sean Beevor 55' m Sebastian Roche 62' c Brendon Mandivenga 68' c Con: Dundlee White-Sharpley (11/14) 4', 10', 23', 39', 51', 56', 60', 64', 69', 79', 80'; Pen: Dundlee White-Sharpley (1/1) 13'	WR Report; Match details	Try: Boubacar Franck Yamba 45' m

Old Georgians RFC, Harare
Attendance: 0
Referee: Ignace N'Dr (Ivory Coast)

== Round 3: 2022 Africa Cup ==
The 2022 Africa Cup acted as the third and final round of the African Qualification process, whereby the winner of an 8-team straight knockout competition qualified for the World Cup as Africa 1. The runner-up advanced to the final Qualification Tournament as Africa 2. This stage began with 4 quarter finals, followed by semi-finals and culminating in a final.

All matches were played in France across the Stade Delort in Marseille, and Stade Maurice David in Aix-en-Provence

=== Teams ===
Rankings as of 27 June 2022 prior to tournament start date

Nation	World Ranking	Final standings
Namibia	24	1st
Kenya	35	2nd
Algeria	90	3rd
Zimbabwe	27	4th
Uganda	52	5th
Ivory Coast	42	6th
Senegal	45	7th
Burkina Faso	91	8th

=== Bracket ===
Quarter-finals
Namibia	71
Burkina Faso	5
Zimbabwe	38
Ivory Coast	11
Uganda	7
Kenya	42
Senegal	12
Algeria	35

Semi-finals
Namibia	34
Zimbabwe	19
Kenya	36
Algeria	33

Final
Namibia	36
Kenya	0
Third place
Zimbabwe	12
Algeria	20

=== Quarter-finals ===
1 July 2022
18:00 CEST (UTC+02)

Namibia	71–5	Burkina Faso
Try: Torsten van Jaarsveld (3) 17' m, 35' m, 46' c Lorenzo Louis (2) 23' c, 40' c Divan Rossouw 55' c Jano Otto 62' c J. C. Greyling (2) 67' c, 73' m Wian Conradie 71' c Danco Burger 79' c Con: Cliven Loubser (7/10) 24', 40', 46', 55', 63', 68', 72'; P. W. Steenkamp (1/1) 80'	Report; WR Report	Try: Jean-Yves Zebango 50' m Cards: Sayouba Ouedraogo (yellow card) 17'; Nourou Bance (yellow card) 62'

Stade Delort, Marseille
Referee: Sylvain Mane (Senegal)

1 July 2022
21:00 CEST (UTC+02)

Zimbabwe	38–11	Ivory Coast
Try: Matthew McNab 16' m Shayne Makombe (2) 18' m, 50' c Aiden Burnett 70' m Matthew Mandioma 78' c Con: Hilton Mudariki (1/4) 51'; Tapiwa Mafura (1/1) 78'; Pen: Hilton Mudariki (3/4) 8', 40', 44'; Cards: Aiden Burnett (red card) 75'	Report; WR Report	Try: Alexandre Pilati 55' m Pen: Eugene Kosse (2/2) 3', 10'; Cards: Mohamed Fofana (yellow card) 8'; Eugene Kosse (yellow card) 18'; Dion Oulai (yellow card) 33'; Jean Philippe Gori (yellow card) 59'; Eugene Nzi (red card) 75'

Stade Delort, Marseille
Referee: Vivien Praderie (France)

2 July 2022
15:00 CEST (UTC+02)

Uganda	7–42	Kenya
Try: Jacob Ochen 71' c Con: Philip Wokorach (1/1) 72'; Cards: Pius Ogena (yellow card) 36'	Report; WR Report	Try: John Okeyo (2) 3' c, 45' c Thomas Ongera 11' c Samuel Asati 33' c Bethwel Muteshi 37' c Teddy Akala 55' c Con: Darwin Kinyangi (5/5) 4', 12', 34', 38', 46'; Jone Tavaga (1/1) 56'

Stade Maurice David, Aix-en-Provence
Referee: Anthony Woodthorpe (England)

2 July 2022
18:00 CEST (UTC+02)

Senegal	12–35	Algeria
Pen: Aldric Folliot (2/4) 24', 34'; Drop: Aldric Folliot (1/1) 7'; Cards: Lamine Sylla (red card) 31'	Report; WR Report	Try: Thomas Lacroix 55' c Penalty try 62'; Mehdi Boundjema 79' m Nadir Megdoud 80' c Con: Benjamin Caminati (2/3) 56', 80'; Pen: Julien Caminati (1/1) 14'; Benjamin Caminati (2/3) 26', 62'

Stade Maurice David, Aix-en-Provence
Referee: Ludovic Cayre (France)

=== Semi-finals ===
6 July 2022
18:00 CEST (UTC+02)

Kenya	36–33	Algeria
Try: John Okeyo (2) 12' c, 21' c Darwin Kinyangi 36' c Jone Tavaga 50' m Eugene Sifuna 53' c Bryceson Adaka 62' m Con: Darwin Kinyangi (3/4) 12', 23', 37'; Jone Tavaga (1/2) 54'	Report; WR Report	Try: Marvyn Youcef 6' c Issam Hamel (2) 15' c, 46' c Nadir Megdoud 59' m Penalty try 68'; Con: Benjamin Caminati (3/4) 7', 16', 47'

Stade Delort, Marseille
Referee: Ben Blain (Scotland)

6 July 2022
21:00 CEST (UTC+02)

Namibia	34–19	Zimbabwe
Try: Gerswin Mouton 9' c Penalty try 39'; Janco Venter 41' c J. C. Greyling 61' m Wian Conradie 68' m Con: Cliven Loubser (2/4) 10', 43'; Pen: Cliven Loubser (1/2) 55'; Cards: Cliven Loubser (yellow card) 75'	Report; WR Report	Try: Cleopas Kundiona 30' m Kelvin Kanenungo 59' c Liam Larkan 76' c Con: Hilton Mudariki (1/1) 60'; Marcus Nel (1/1) 76'; Cards: Jason Fraser (yellow card) 39'

Stade Maurice David, Aix-en-Provence
Referee: Ludovic Cayre (France)

=== Third place play-off ===
10 July 2022
18:30 CEST (UTC+02)

Zimbabwe	12–20	Algeria
Pen: Hilton Mudariki (3/3) 9', 18', 21'; Tapiwa Mafura (1/1) 44'	Report; WR Report	Try: Joseph Reynaud 8' m Pen: Mathieu Lorée (2/3) 34', 50'; Benjamin Caminati (3/3) 63', 70', 80'

Stade Maurice David, Aix-en-Provence
Referee: Aymen Jriji (Tunisia)

=== Final: Africa 1 play-off ===
10 July 2022
21:00 CEST (UTC+02)

Namibia	36–0	Kenya
Try: Wian Conradie (3) 17' m, 34' c, 78' c Johan Deysel 80' m Con: Cliven Loubser (1/2) 35'; P. W. Steenkamp (1/2) 78'; Pen: Cliven Loubser (4/4) 24', 49', 60', 67'	Report; WR Report

Stade Maurice David, Aix-en-Provence
Referee: Ludovic Cayre (France)

Team details

FB	15	Divan Rossouw
RW	14	J. C. Greyling
OC	13	Johan Deysel (c)
IC	12	Danco Burger	(substituted off) 76'
LW	11	Gerswin Mouton
FH	10	Cliven Loubser	(substituted off) 71'
SH	9	Damian Stevens	(substituted off) 63'
N8	8	Adriaan Booysen	(substituted off) 50'
OF	7	Janco Venter
BF	6	Wian Conradie
RL	5	Johan Retief
LL	4	Adriaan Ludick	(substituted off) 50'
TP	3	Aranos Coetzee	(substituted off) 63'
HK	2	Torsten van Jaarsveld	(substituted off) 63'
LP	1	Des Sethie	(substituted off) 52'
Replacements:
HK	16	Louis van der Westhuizen	(substituted on) 63'
PR	17	Jano Otto	(substituted on) 52'
PR	18	Jason Benade	(substituted on) 63'
LK	19	Ruan Ludick	(substituted on) 50'
FL	20	Prince ǃGaoseb	(substituted on) 50'
SH	21	TC Kisting	(substituted on) 63'
FH	22	P. W. Steenkamp	(substituted on) 71'
CE	23	Alcino Izaacs	(substituted on) 76'
Coach:
(South Africa) Allister Coetzee

FB	15	Darwin Mukidza
RW	14	Jacob Ojee	(substituted off) 68'
OC	13	Vincent Onyala
IC	12	John Okoth
LW	11	Collins Injera
FH	10	Dominic Coulson
SH	9	Samuel Asati
N8	8	Bethwel Anami
OF	7	Daniel Sikuta (c)
BF	6	George Nyambua	(substituted off) 52'
RL	5	Thomas Okeyo	(substituted off) 68'
LL	4	Malcolm Onsando
TP	3	Ephraim Oduor	(substituted off) 52'
HK	2	Eugene Sifuna	(substituted off) 52'
LP	1	Patrick Ouko	(substituted off) 50'
Replacements:
HK	16	Teddy Akala	(substituted on) 52'
PR	17	Edward Mwaura	(substituted on) 50'
PR	18	Joseph Odero	(substituted on) 52'
LK	19	Davis Chenge	(substituted on) 52'
FL	20	Martin Owilah	(substituted on) 68'
SH	21	Brian Tanga
FH	22	Jone Kubu
CE	23	Bryceson Adaka	(substituted on) 68'
Coach:
(Kenya) Paul Odera

Assistant referees:
Anthony Woodthorpe (England)
Ben Blain (Scotland)
Television match official:
Philippe Bonhoure (France)

=== Ranking matches ===
==== 5–8th place play-offs ====
Semi-finals
Burkina Faso	17
Ivory Coast	38
Uganda	30
Senegal	29

5th/6th place
Ivory Coast	17
Uganda	18
7th/8th place
Burkina Faso	30
Senegal	44

===== Semi-finals =====
6 July 2022
15:00 CEST (UTC+02)

Uganda	30–29	Senegal
Try: Jacob Ochen 26' c Philip Wokorach (2) 34' c, 66' c Con: Philip Wokorach (3/3) 26', 35', 67'; Pen: Philip Wokorach (3/4) 50', 73', 79'; Cards: Emmanuel Ecodu (yellow card) 49'	WR Report	Try: Mamadou N'Diaye 9' c Kaman Gassama 40' c Abdelkarim Fofana 53' c Samba Mohamed 60' m Con: Aldric Folliot (3/4) 10', 40', 53'; Pen: Aldric Folliot (1/1) 76'

Stade Delort, Marseille
Referee: Nicardo Pienaar (Namibia)

6 July 2022
18:00 CEST (UTC+02)

Burkina Faso	17–38	Ivory Coast
Try: Joel Compaore 14' m Adama Deme 26' c Nourou Bance 41' m Con: Kassoum Deme (1/3) 27'; Cards: Moussa Rabo (yellow card) 18'	WR Report	Try: Ezer Kosse 8' m Ismael Martin (2) 20' c, 43' c Dion Oulai 48' c Paul Diallo dit Peres 71' c Issac Coulibaly 77' m Con: Ezer Kosse (4/6) 21', 43', 48', 71'

Stade Maurice David, Aix-en-Provence
Referee: Precious Pazani (Zimbabwe)

===== 7th/8th play-off =====
10 July 2022
13:00 CEST (UTC+02)

Burkina Faso	30–44	Senegal
Try: Cheick Abasse Sawadogo 28'c Stephane Bationo 40' m Adama Deme 42' c Kassoum Deme 65' m Con: Kassoum Deme (2/4) 29', 43'; Pen: Kassoum Deme (2/2) 4', 69'; Cards: Nourou Bance (yellow card) 32'; Flavien Sen Benebe Vuagnat (yellow card) 55'	WR Report	Try: Saibo Sakho 17' m Ousmane Soumah (2) 36' c, 51' c Khadim Cisse (2) 56' m, 72' c Mokhtar Sougoufara 62' c Con: Aldric Folliot (4/6) 36', 51', 62', 73'; Pen: Aldric Folliot (2/3) 25', 47'; Cards: Khadim Cisse (yellow card) 9'

Stade Maurice David, Aix-en-Provence
Referee: Victor Ojuku (Kenya)

===== 5th/6th play-off =====
10 July 2022
15:00 CEST (UTC+02)

Ivory Coast	17–18	Uganda
Try: Hamed Diarra 12' c Paul Diallo Dit Peres 72' c Con: Ezer Kosse (2/2) 13', 72'; Pen: Ezer Kosse (1/2) 50'	WR Report	Try: Solomon Okia 35' m Conrad Wandera 46' c Con: Ivan Magomu (1/2) 47'; Pen: Ivan Magomu (1/1) 3'; Drop: Joseph Aredo Jadwong (1/1) 70'

Stade Maurice David, Aix-en-Provence
Referee: Talent Gandiwa (Zimbabwe)

== See also ==
- Africa Cup
- Rugby Africa
