= Rugby union in Tanzania =

Rugby union in Tanzania is a minor but growing sport.

The governing body is the Tanzania Rugby Union, which is an associate member of the IRB. Originally the Tanzanian Rugby Football Union was incorporated into the Rugby Football Union of East Africa (RFUEA) in 1956. This tended to be dominated by Kenya, but Tanzania got its own union in the 1970s.

== History ==
Tanzanian rugby was for a long while subsumed under "East Africa", which tended to be dominated by Kenya. The game is established in the former Tanganyika, but not Zanzibar, despite attempts to help get the game established there.

For many years rugby in East Africa was dominated by whites and expatriates, In Kenya and Uganda the game was readily taken up by the indigenous black community in the early 1970s though in Tanzania black players still make up a minority of the sport's participants there are several initiatives to change this.

Tanzania is a founder member of the Confederation of African Rugby (CAR), which was launched officially in January 1986, in Tunis, Tunisia. Rugby officials from Tunisia, Morocco, Senegal, Ivory Coast, Kenya, the Seychelles and Madagascar also attended.

== National team ==
Originally Tanzania, along with Kenya and Uganda was represented by the East Africa rugby union team. This consisted mostly of white settlers from Kenya, and the games tended to be hosted in Nairobi.

The British and Irish Lions played games against an East African side, on their 1955 tour, and 1962 tours (losing 50–0).

Tanzania now has its own team. Tanzania won the CAR Castel Cup in 2006.

== See also ==
- Africa Cup
- Nairn McEwan, Scotland rugby union player and second national coach.
- Jacky Morkel and Tommy Thompson South Africa buried in Dar es Salaam
- Anthony Henniker-Gotley
- Sport in Tanzania
