= Rugby union in Madagascar =

- Country: Madagascar
- National team: Madagascar
- First played: 1890s
- Registered players: 42,540
- Clubs: 410

National competitions
- Rugby World Cup; Rugby World Cup Sevens; Sevens World Series

Rugby union in Madagascar is the most popular team sport in the nation. As of August 2023, Madagascar is ranked 45th worldwide by World Rugby (WR), and boasts over 42,540 registered players and more than 410 rugby clubs. Although Madagascar lacks a professional competition, as it is one of the poorest countries in the world, it does possess a national club competition that is extensively covered in the national print media, as well as having matches televised. Rugby is considered the national sport of Madagascar. The governing body is the Madagascan Rugby Federation or Fédération Malagasy de Rugby.

Madagascar is one of the six nations where rugby union is the most popular sport, alongside New Zealand, Fiji, Samoa, Tonga, and Wales.

== History ==
Rugby union was introduced to Madagascar in the 1890s by French railroad workers who played the game in the capital, Antananarivo, during the colonial period. Historically the sport was seen as a violent pastime of the poor, however recent developments have seen a huge increase in the sport's profile throughout the country. The Madagascar team, locally referred to as the Makis (a Malagasy word for the ring-tailed lemur), reached the finals of the 2005 Africa Cup, increasing nationwide interest in the sport. Since then they have been semi-finalists in 2006, and 2013, finished 4th in 2014, and been finalists again in 2007.

Madagascar is a founder member of the Confederation of African Rugby (CAR), which was launched officially in January 1986, in Tunis, Tunisia. Rugby officials from Tunisia, Morocco, Senegal, Ivory Coast, Tanzania, Kenya, and the Seychelles also attended.

== Competitions ==
The national club competition is structured along the same lines as the Argentine club championship. The regional unions within Madagascar send their top club(s) from the previous year's championship to compete in the nationwide top-flight league called the Top 8.

The national team also competes annually in the Africa Cup, where matches sometimes double as Confederation of African Rugby Rugby World Cup qualifiers.

== Popularity ==
In addition to large participant numbers, rugby is popular with spectators in Madagascar. The Top 8 has average attendance figures of over 10,000, whilst the league final, and most international fixtures, attract crowds upward of 40,000 at the Stade Municipal de Mahamasina in the capital. It is common that international rugby matches substantially outdraw those of football at the Mahamasina. Rugby's popularity is strongest in the central highlands region including Antananarivo.

Rugby union's popularity in the country was recently demonstrated during the Division 1B Final of the Africa Cup, held in Madagascar. Madagascar triumphed over Namibia in front of 40,000 fans to stay in the qualification process for the 2015 Rugby World Cup to be held in the United Kingdom.

In Madagascar, rugby is a very popular sport among women. It is estimated that 60% of players in the country are women. The girls from Sapphire Coast and their captain Marcelia, backed by the French NGO Terres en Mêlées are emerging as models for the development of women rugby in poor areas outside the capital city. They actually won twice the national girls championship. Rugby is thus becoming a real tool to fight against poverty and develop gender equality in the country. Marcelia has been nominated one of the five most influential women of the country in 2019 by promoting development through rugby in Madagascar and in France.

== Attendances ==
The average home league attendances in the 2025 XXL Energy Top 12:

Club	Average
COSFA	10,438
FTM	9,892
TFM	8,945
USCAR	7,619
TAM	7,173
3FB	6,746
TFA	6,329
USA	5,972
MangArt	5,536
FTBA	5,105
CEA	4,681
STM	4,159
Average	6,883

== See also ==
- Madagascar national rugby union team
- Madagascar national rugby sevens team
- Madagascar women's national rugby sevens team
- Africa Cup
- Confederation of African Rugby
