= Rugby Club CERN =

Swiss rugby union club, based in Geneva

(Switzerland) Rugby Club CERN
- Full name: Rugby Club CERN - Meyrin - St Genis
- Founded: 1965; 61 years ago
- Location: Geneva, Switzerland
- Ground(s): Stade des Serves; 46.2393°N 6.0371°E; Stade de Meyrin; 46.233352°N 6.07081°E
- President: (France) Grégory Bertrand
- Coach: (Romania) Gica Vacariu
- Captain: (France) Kévin Boonroy (Switzerland) Nicolas Baronciani
- League: Swiss 2nd Division
- 2018-19: 8th and relegated from 1st Division
Team kit

Official website
- www.cern-rugby.ch

Rugby Club CERN - Meyrin - St Genis (RC CMSG) are a semi-professional Swiss rugby union club situated on the French–Swiss border, 5 kilometres (3.1 mi) northwest of Geneva. The club plays in the Swiss first division where it is one of the most successful teams in the country's history, behind Hermance RRC.

== Club history ==
RC CMSG was formed as Rugby Club du CERN (Rugby Club of CERN) in 1965, making it the oldest club currently playing in Switzerland. The earliest recorded match in Switzerland was in 1869 and if they were still in existence, Lausanne RFC could have claimed to be as old as Blackheath. The club was originally formed by staff of CERN (European Organization for Nuclear Research) in around 1960, playing against other companies and organizations in the Geneva area. In 1970, RC CERN organised a memorial competition, Challenge Laurent Membrez, in honor of Laurent Membrez, the founder of Albaladejo Rugby Club. This led to the creation of the Swiss Rugby Federation in 1972 with the then president of RC CERN, André Cordaillat, becoming the federation's first president. In 1984, the club moved to its present ground just across the border in Saint-Genis-Pouilly, France; despite being officially renamed to Rugby Club CERN - St Genis, it was still referred to as RC CERN. Then in 2003 the club merged with the successful Ecole de rugby Meyrin (Meyrin Rugby School), creating the present Rugby Club CERN - Meyrin - St Genis with two stadiums, one in France and one in Switzerland. In 2005, the Wildcats, RC CMSG's women's rugby team, were created, adding to the growth of women's rugby in Switzerland.

After the creation of the Swiss Federation, the club enjoyed considerable success, winning both the Swiss Championship and Swiss Cup repeatedly. In the early 1990s, the fortunes of the club started to change and their successes became less frequent, with the club eventually being relegated to the second division in 1994. The club regained promotion a couple of years later but were only to remain in the first division for a further two years. After a dispute between players, coaches and management, the president removed the club from all competitions. In the autumn of 2000, a new management took control of the club, bringing in ex-England B, Ireland A, Northampton and Gloucester second row, John Etheridge, as coach. The club then won the third and second divisions in consecutive years, but were unable to stay in the first division, and after the second relegation from the first division, Etheridge left the club. In 2007, RC CMSG appointed Claude Ezoua as head coach, who notably took the Ivory Coast rugby team to the 1995 Rugby World Cup. The club then achieved promotion back to the first division in the 2008–2009 season, losing only one game in the whole season, with the club managing to stay in the first division during the 2009–2010 season for the first time in 15 years. RC CMSG slowly climbed to the top of table, each season finishing higher than the previous, and making the league knock-out stages for three consecutive seasons. In 2014 CERN re-enforced the coaching setup with the ex-Romanian national squad captain Ioan Doja who represented his country at the World Cup, also playing teams such as for Oyonnax.

The January 2015 General Assembly voted in new club president Grégory Bertrand, long time member of the club. Due to a number of players leaving the club, the management asked the Swiss Federation for the club to be relegated to the second division for the 2015/2016 season after 6 years in the first division. The 2015/2016 season saw CERN undefeated at home and following the league play off matches they were promoted back to the first division after only one season in the second division.

== Club honours ==
Competitions	Years
Swiss Champions (NLA)	1974, 1977, 1978, 1979, 1980, 1982, 1984, 1989, 1990, 1991
Swiss Champions (LNFA- Wildcats)	2018
Swiss Cup	1973, 1974, 1977, 1988, 1989, 1990, 1992
Federation Cup	1975, 1991
Second Division Champions (NLB)	1998, 2002, 2009, 2016
Third Division Champions (NLC)	2001

== Presidents ==
1965 – 1972	André Cordaillat
1972 – 1975	Michael Gamble
1976 – 1991	Jacques Morand
1992 - 1993	Pascal Mesenge
1994 - 1995	Neil Calder
1996 - 1998	Henri Masseboeuf
1999 - 2000	Roger Girardot
2001 - 2003	Ray Veness
2004 - 2005	Matteo Mazzanti
2005 - 2015	Peter MacAvock
2015 - 2020	Grégory Bertrand
2020 - 2021	Thierry Nicod
2021 - 2024	Sabrina El yacoubi

== Coaches ==
=== Men ===
1965 – 1996	?
1996 – 1999	Christian Marcon (France)
1999 – 2000	Eric Planes (France)
2000 - 2007	John Etheridge (Republic of Ireland)
2007	Ali Day (England)	Damian Moore (England)
2007 - 2010	Claude Ezoua (Ivory Coast)	Ali Day (England)
2010 - 2011	Ali Day (England)	Gianni Di Martino (Italy)
2011 - 2014	Sebastien Frunza (Romania)	Yann Mauvoisin (France)
2014 - 2015	Sebastien Frunza (Romania)	Ioan Doja (Romania)
2015 - 2018	Ioan Doja (Romania)	Yann Mauvoisin (France)
2018 - 2019	Yann Mauvoisin (France)	Vicent Suchaud (France)	Gabriel Trochard (France)	Michael Conway (Wales)
2019 -	Gica Vacariu (Romania)

=== Women (Wildcats) ===
2005	Paul Clements-Hunt (England)
2005 - 2007	Ali Day (England)
2007 - 2008	Gianni Di Martino (Italy)
2008 - 2015	Moyenda Chaponda (United States)
2015 - 2018	Christian Von Arx (Switzerland)
2021 - 2024	Amy Berthaut Farr (New Zealand)
2023 - 2024	Julie Coupard (France)

== See also ==
- Rugby union in Switzerland
- Swiss Rugby Federation
- Nyon Rugby Club
- Stade Lausanne Rugby Club
