= Rugby union in Tunisia =

- Country: Tunisia
- Governing body: Fédération Tunisienne de Rugby
- National team: Tunisia
- Registered players: 15830
- Clubs: 72

National competitions
- Rugby World Cup; Rugby World Cup Sevens; IRB Sevens World Series (former) European Nations Cup

Rugby union in Tunisia is a significant sport. They are currently ranked 39th in the world, with 15830 registered players (3,941 female), and 72 clubs.

== Governing body ==
The Fédération Tunisienne de Rugby was founded in 1972, and affiliated to the IRFB in 1988.

== History ==
Like rugby union in Morocco, and many of the other North African countries, Tunisian rugby is a legacy of French colonialism after the First World War. Like many other Maghrebi nations, Tunisian rugby tended to look to Europe for inspiration, rather than to the rest of Africa.

This has proven a mixed blessing, as Tunisian players have the prospect of "promotion" to French professionalism, but also potentially weaken the Tunisian system, and national team.

Tunisian rugby also suffers from two other problems - the climate, and the fact that Tunisia does not tend to produce "big men".

The Tunisian game made huge strides during the 80s and 90s, thanks to the intelligent leadership and direction of Dr Bouraoui Regaya. In 1989, they entered a national team into the Hong Kong Sevens for the first time.

Tunisia's traditional rivals are Morocco, but they tend to be beaten by them. This is partly because Tunisia has around half the number of registered players that Morocco does.

Tunisia is a founder member of the Confederation of African Rugby (CAR), which was launched officially in January 1986, in Tunis. Rugby officials from Morocco, Senegal, Ivory Coast, Tanzania, Kenya, the Seychelles and Madagascar attended.

== Women's rugby ==
Although Tunisia's women have not yet played test match rugby, they have been playing international sevens rugby since 2004. (Current playing record).

== National team ==
The Tunisia national rugby union team played their first international in 1979.

The national sevens team has also had some success, beating Australia and Scotland.

Tunisia originally competed in the European Nations Cup, but has now transferred into the Africa Cup.

Tunisia's proudest day, perhaps, was when they beat Romania in Tunis in 1982.
