= Rugby union in Switzerland =

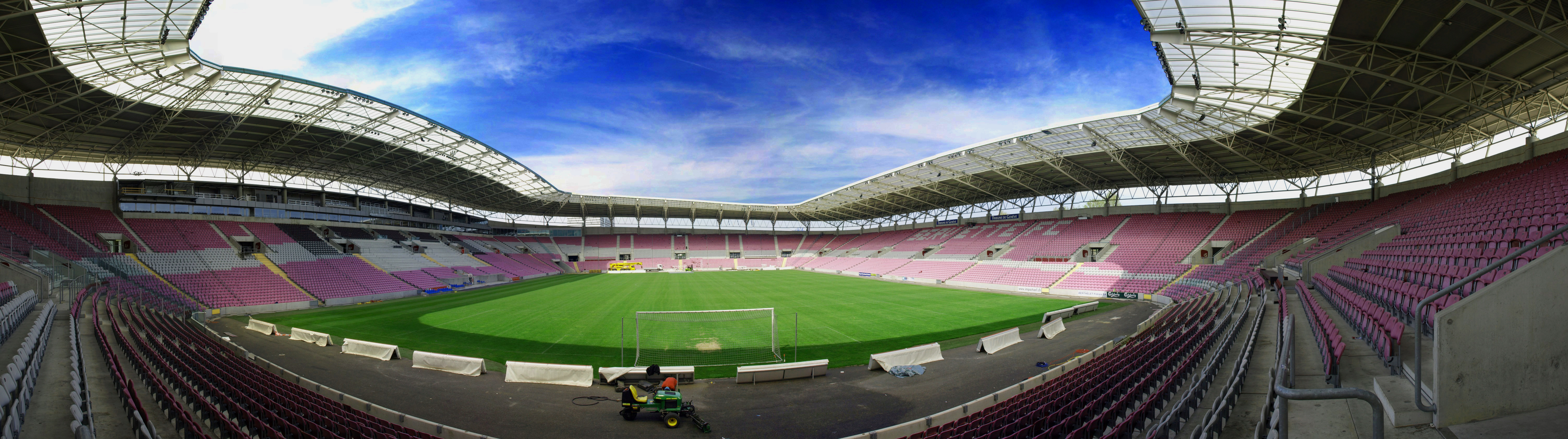
- The Stade de Genève, which saw some rugby action in the 2006-07 Heineken Cup
- Country: Switzerland
- Governing body: Swiss Rugby Federation
- National team: Switzerland
- First played: 1869
- Registered players: ~5000
- Clubs: 32

National competitions
- Rugby World Cup; Rugby World Cup Sevens; IRB Sevens World Series; European Nations Cup

Rugby union in Switzerland is a minor but growing sport.

== Governing body ==
The Swiss Rugby Federation was founded in 1972 and joined the IRFB in 1988.

== History ==
Like neighbouring Germany, Austria and France, Swiss rugby is actually amongst the oldest in the world. The earliest recorded match in Switzerland was in 1869, and Lausanne RFC can claim to be as old as Blackheath.

However, Swiss rugby continued at a very low key for over a hundred years. The World Wars and other global upheavals hindered the game, and it was really the presence of a number of ex-patriates working in the banking industry, or as tax exiles, who helped keep the game going.

In 1974, a side from Basel toured France and were on the end of record breaking defeats. They lost 127-0 to Grenoble, 104-3 to Thonon and 116-0 to Annecy. The captain of the Basel team, Pierre Langlois said, "We conceded 73 tries, I think. We even had a penalty try given against us when we were losing by 100 points."

Swiss rugby continued in a haphazard manner during the 1970s and 80s, for example, when Switzerland was due to play Bellinzona RFC in Italy, two of their players were delayed by a landslide. In order to make up numbers, a journalist and their coach driver were added to the squad. They did so well in the game that they were invited to subsequent training sessions.

Under the leadership of Evelyne Oberson in the 1980s, the Swiss Federation implemented a development program that resulted in an increase in native players. Working independently as a volunteer in Lausanne, Oberson was a central figure in Swiss rugby. Her organizational and administrative contributions were a foundation to the management of the Federation from the 1980s through its transition into its current structure.

In 1989, Chris Thau claimed that Switzerland had around 1,000 players (a number which has increased somewhat since then).

There are at least thirty Swiss clubs at present.

Home grown players now dominate Swiss rugby, and it could be considered at a similar level to that of Italy or France.

More recently, 2006-07 Heineken Cup clash between the French side Bourgoin and Irish rugby's Munster was moved from Bourgoin's home ground, to the Stade de Genève (Geneva Stadium). The stadium's capacity is 30,000, and attendance on the day was 16,255.

Notable Swiss players include:

- Eric Planes, scrum half
- Jean-Marc Morand, no 8
- Viktor von Burg, captain.

== Local clubs ==
- Grasshopper Club Zürich
- Hermance Région Rugby Club
- Lausanne Université Club Rugby
- Nyon Rugby Club
- Rugby Club Avusy
- Rugby Club CERN Meyrin-St.Genis
- Rugby Club Genève Plan-les-Ouates
- Rugby Club Yverdon-les-Bains
- Rugby Football Club Basel
- Rugby Club Lucerne
- Zug Rugby Club
- Rugby Club Würenlos
- Rugby Club Bern
- Rugby Club Palezieux (formerly Haute-Broye)
- Stade Lausanne Rugby Club
- Rugby Club Schaffhausen
- Rugby Club Winterthur
- Neuchâtel-Sports Rugby Club
- RC Bagnes (Val de Bagnes-Verbier)

== See also ==
- Switzerland national rugby union team
