= Rugby union in Senegal =

- Country: Senegal
- Governing body: Fédération Sénégalaise de Rugby
- National team: Senegal
- First played: Late nineteenth century
- Registered players: 16009
- Clubs: 13

National competitions
- Rugby World Cup; Rugby World Cup Sevens; IRB Sevens World Series

Rugby union in Senegal is a moderately popular sport. As of 21 July 2025, the Senegal national team was ranked 45th by World Rugby.

== Governing body ==
The governing body is the Fédération Sénégalaise de Rugby.

== History ==
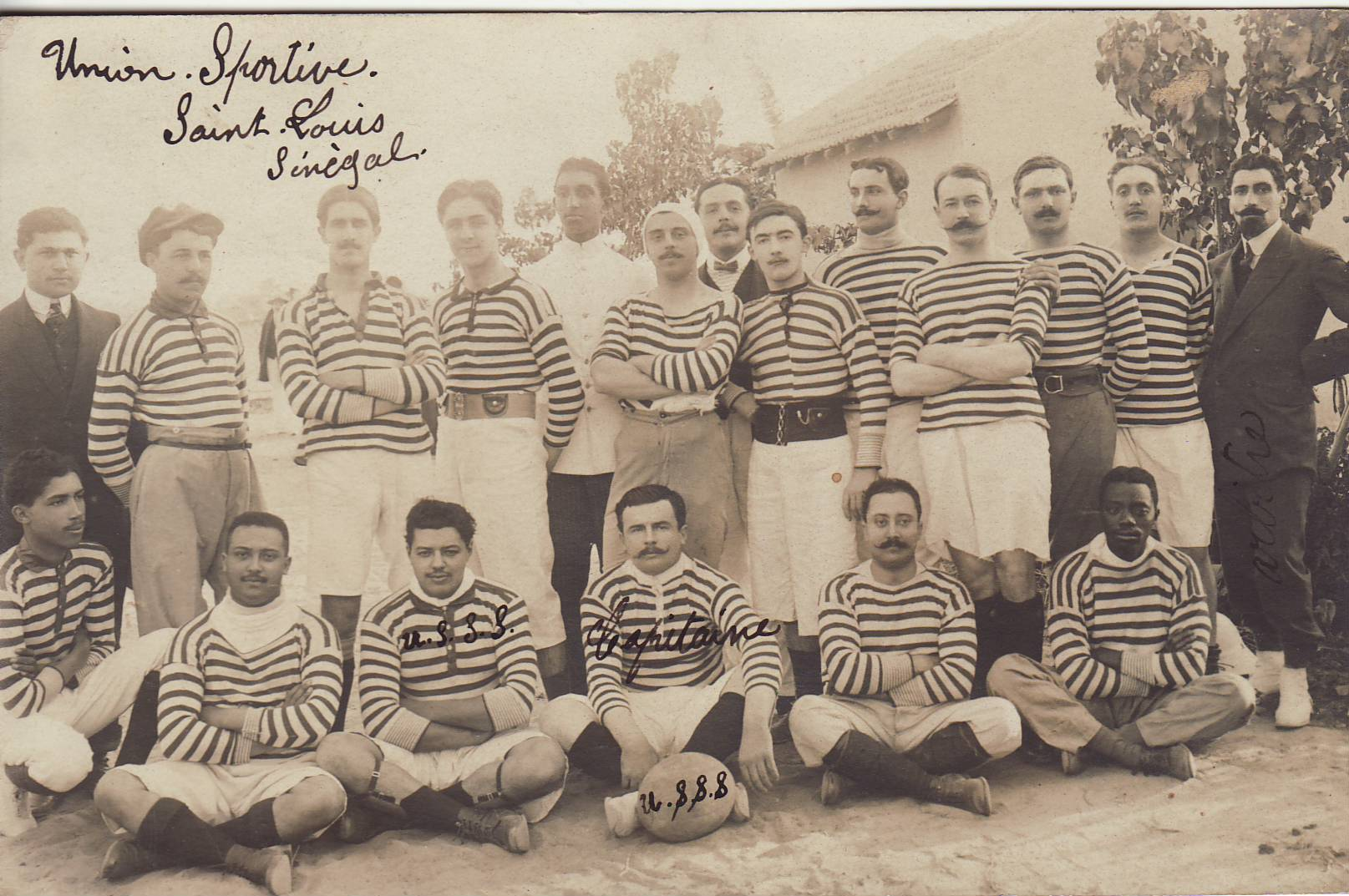
A Senegalese team in 1911

Senegal is a founder member of the Confederation of African Rugby (CAR), which was launched officially in January 1986, in Tunis, Tunisia. Rugby officials from Tunisia, Morocco, Ivory Coast, Tanzania, Kenya, the Seychelles and Madagascar attended.

Rugby has been played in Senegal by French colonialists since the 1920s, and they created a union in 1960. For 20 to 30 years rugby was a game only for the French colonists and the military.

Rugby was largely unknown among the Senegalese until the 1990s. In the late 1990s, the Fédération Sénégalaise de Rugby increased the visibility of the game among the Senegalese, with a new policy aiming to develop rugby in the schools. Rugby took off in 2005 when Senegal participated in their first Rugby World Cup qualifying and played six international games.

In 2005, the national Rugby championships comprised just five clubs, all of them made up of French immigrants. Eight years later, there were 12 clubs, and all but one of them was fully Senegalese. In 2014, 18 clubs came to at least one of the national championships, whether it be men’s, women’s, Fifteens or Sevens.

This has led to the International Rugby Board increasing its development grant every year. The Senegalese federation has been growing rugby in Senegal. The Senegalese federation receives technical and training support from the IRB and the Confédération Africaine de Rugby (CAR), where professionals come to Senegal and deliver short, intensive courses.

== National team ==
The Senegal national team has been playing regular international rugby since 2003. In 2005, Senegal participated in their first Rugby World Cup qualifying, and played six international games. The Senegalese union identified players of Senegal origin in France, and tried to build a stronger national team with expats to raise the profile of the game.

Senegal are ranked in the top ten in Africa and in the top 50 in the world. They have shown that they can compete with the other African countries: in 2012, they lost to Namibia by just two points, and by only three in 2008.

== Players ==
Notable Senegalese players include Max Brito, who played for the Ivory Coast's national side, and had a notorious accident in the Rugby World Cup.

== See also ==
- Senegal national rugby union team
- Confederation of African Rugby
- Africa Cup
