= Rugby union in Kenya =

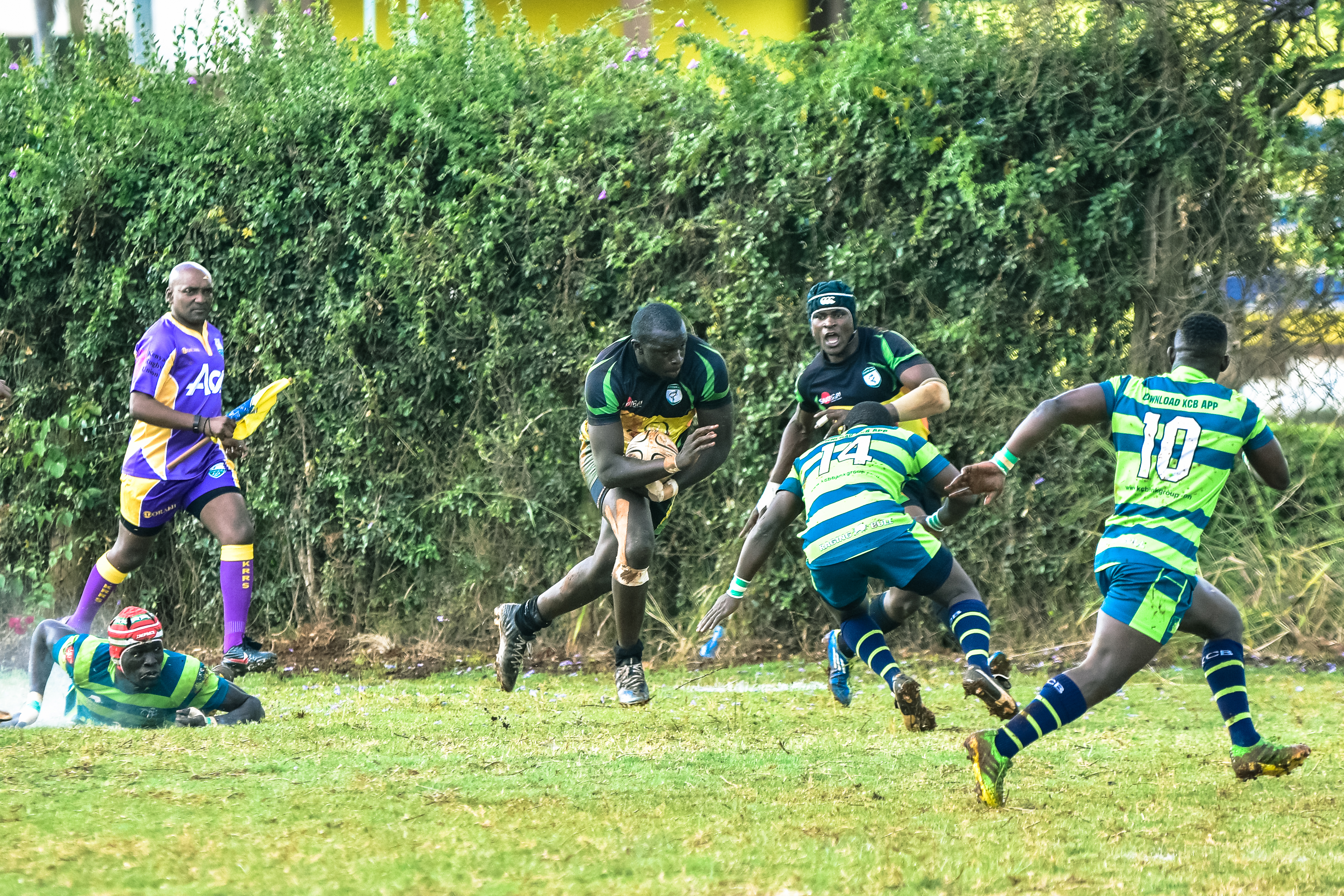
- Top Fry Nakuru RFC in a Kenya Cup match against KCB RFC
- Country: Kenya
- Governing body: Kenya Rugby Union
- National team: Kenya
- First played: 1909
- Registered players: 42,904 (as of 2011)
- Clubs: 60

National competitions
- Rugby World Cup; Rugby World Cup Sevens; World Rugby Sevens Series

Club competitions
- Kenya Cup; Nationwide League; Eric Shirley Shield; Bamburi Rugby Super Series; Enterprise Cup; Kenya National Sevens Circuit

Rugby union in Kenya is a popular sport, in particular due to the success of the Kenya national rugby sevens team in the rugby sevens format, and tournaments such as the Safari Sevens, which has been growing yearly, and now includes numerous international teams.

== Governing body ==
The sport is governed by the Kenya Rugby Union.

The Rugby Football Union of Kenya (RFU-K) was formed in 1923. RFU-K was then incorporated into the Rugby Football Union of East Africa (RFUEA) in 1956. Kenya deaf Rugby Football Union was formed in 1970 to govern the game in Kenya.

At the 2019 Kenyan Sports Personality of the Year awards KDRFU won the federation of the year category.

== History ==
Rugby has a long history in Kenya.

The first recorded game in Kenya took place in 1909, when a team composed of predominantly British "Officials" took on mainly Afrikaaner "Settlers" in Mombasa.

The Rugby Football Union of Kenya (RFU-K) was formed in 1923, the same year when Nairobi District team split to form Harlequins RFC (which is not the current club Kenya Harlequins which was formed in 1952) and Nondescripts RFC. Impala RFC, another traditional club was founded in the 1930s. For a number of years, the Nondescripts and the Harlequins were two of the best sides in the country and dominated Kenyan rugby.

When the British Isles went to South Africa for their 1955 tour and their 1962 tour, they played East Africa sides in Nairobi, on the return leg of their journey. The Lions won both of these games, 39-12 and 50-0 respectively.

The East Africa team played some of the best sides in the world, including the British Lions in 1955, South Africa in 1961, and Wales in 1964.

The political struggle in Kenya took a heavy toll on rugby. Not only had the white population failed to promote the game properly amongst the black African and Asian population in Kenya, but when employment restrictions were introduced by the newly independent Kenyan state, they ensured that a number of the white British and South Africans who had been the mainstay of the game previously left the country.

The large distances involved would frequently cause big communication problems for Kenyan teams. For example, in 1974, when Nairobi was due to play Mombasa, the Mombasa team flew to Nairobi, while the Nairobi team drove to Mombasa. It was a 950-mile round trip, meaning that the two teams covered nearly 2,000 miles in a game that didn't happen.

Until the mid-1970s the sport in Kenya was mainly played by expatriates. This changed once new "black" clubs, Mean Machine RFC and Mwamba RFC were formed. Today, rugby in Kenya is played almost exclusively by indigenous players. Rugby in Kenya is mostly played in Nairobi, only a handful of teams come from outside the capital.

The struggle to make Kenyan rugby truly multiracial, and to make it popular was tackled frantically by the KRFU in the post-independence period, with success only coming under its president George Kariuki in the 1980s and 1990s. The former Gloucester player Dave Protherough helped out the KRFU, before his death in the mid-1990s, and helped the game to thrive once more.

Kenya is a founder member of the Confederation of African Rugby (CAR), which was launched officially in January 1986, in Tunis. Rugby officials from Morocco, Senegal, Ivory Coast, Tanzania, the Seychelles and Madagascar also attended.

Kenya plays host to the annual Bamburi Rugby Super Series which teams from other East African countries also attend. In 2009, it also hosted the IRB Junior World Rugby Trophy, the second tier of the under-20 world championship structure established in 2008 by the sport's governing body, the International Rugby Board (IRB).

Safari Sevens is an international Rugby sevens tournament played annually in Nairobi and is the most popular rugby competition in Kenya.

== National team ==
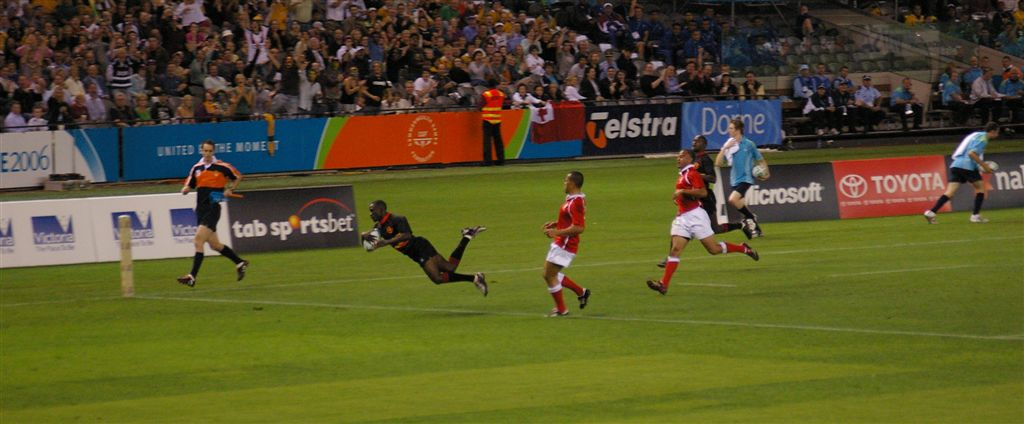
Kenya scores a try against Tonga.

Kenya dominated the local 'international' rugby scene but when combined with Tanzania and Uganda they formed the East Africa rugby union team. This consisted mostly of white settlers from Kenya, and the games tended to be hosted in Nairobi. Nicknamed The Tuskers, a name which was taken from a local beer, the first overseas touring East Africa XV played in the Copperbelt of what was then Northern Rhodesia, now Zambia, in September 1954 when they won six out of seven matches.

The British Isles played games against an East African side, on their 1955 tour, and 1962 tours (losing 50–0).

The national team played its first international in 1955, and is yet to qualify for the Rugby World Cup. However, the country's sevens team has had far more international success.

Kenya was ranked 39th in the world by the IRB as of 6 April 2009. However, in 2010, Kenya rose in the ranking to 32nd in the world and later ranked 31st in 2013 after beating Zimbabwe 29–17 in a tournament that doubled up as the qualifying stage for the 2015 World Cup. As of the 31st of October 2022, the team was ranked number 33 by World Rugby.

As of 2023 Kenya is ranked 31st by World Rugby and has been playing impressively well. This is evident in their results in the African Rugby Cup as Kenya have been the runners-up of the past four years in a row losing to Namibia. As well as this they also finished second in the 2023 Rugby World Cup African Qualification tournament which qualified them for the repechage cup.

== Sevens team ==
The national sevens team are currently one of the 12 "core teams" in the IRB Sevens World Series, advancing at least to the semi-finals of three events in the 2008–09 season, and also reached the semi-finals of the 2009 Rugby World Cup Sevens.

They also managed to win the 2016 IRB Sevens World Series cup in Dubai.

== Domestic structure ==
The popularity of Kenyan rugby has greatly increased over the last few years and the country now has over 40 clubs, 40,000 players, of whom nearly 30,000 are teenagers and 3000 are women.

=== School rugby ===
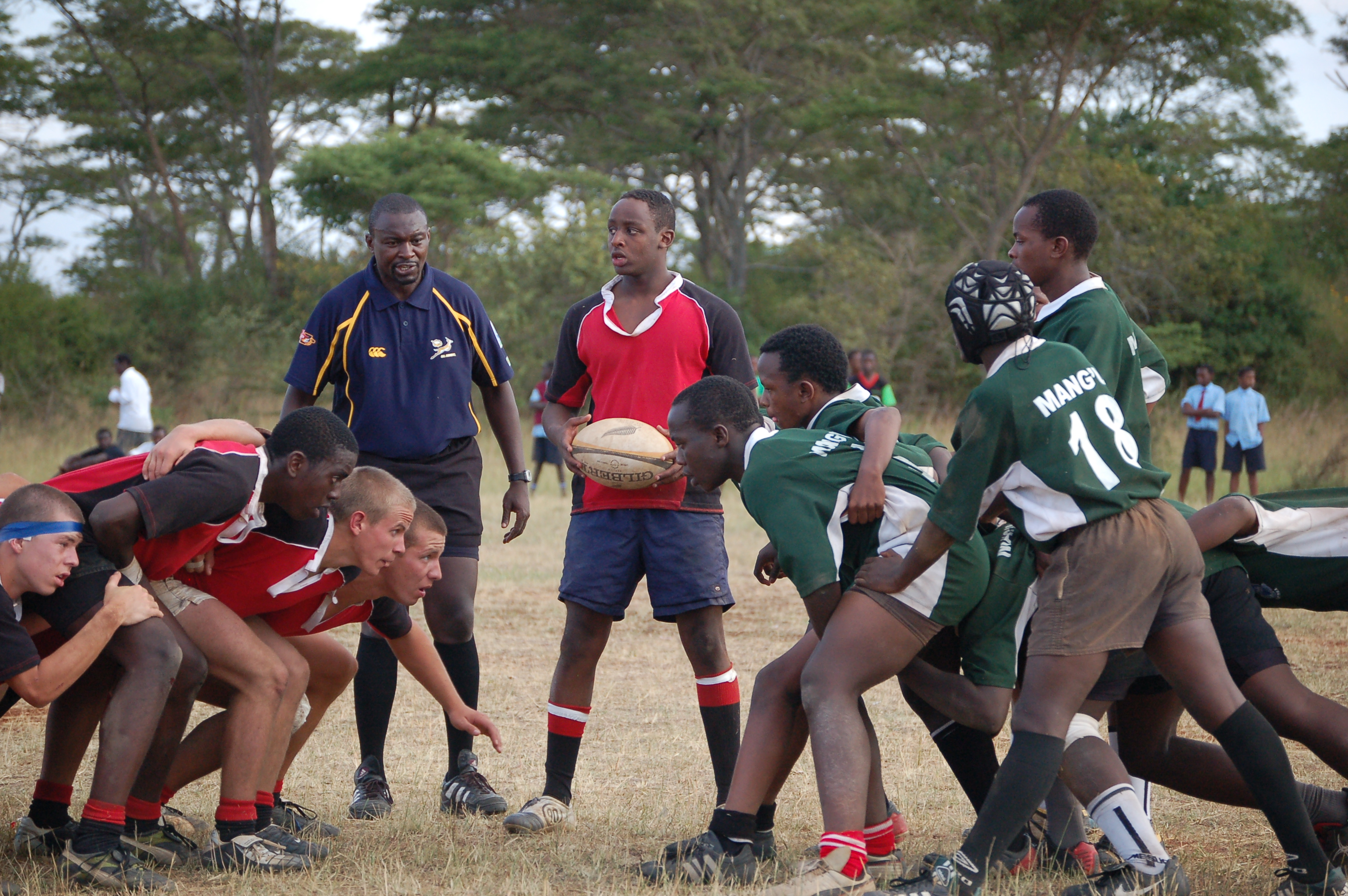
Rift Valley Academy take on Mang'u High School in a Prescott Cup game.

The KRFU also oversees Kenyan schools rugby, including the Prescott Cup for the most elite teams, and the Damu Pevu shield for the second level of teams (and second XV). In 1990, Rugby 15s was admitted as formal sport in secondary schools around the country and in 2008 it was admitted as a primary school sport. Rugby Sevens was admitted as a formal sport in secondary schools in 2004.

A major part of competition at the junior level is the St Mary's Blackrock Festival which has been used to scout for Kenya's top players for the last 26 years. Biko Adema, a current Kenya sevens player, was once the most valuable player in the tournament.

=== Club rugby ===
The Kenya Cup is the highest level rugby union league in Kenya and is yet to turn professional. Since the early 1960s The Eric Shirley Shield has been competed by club 2nd XV's and smaller clubs. The national cup competition, Enterprise Cup, has been played almost uninterrupted since 1930 (with the exception of the war years and 1987 during the All African Games). In addition there is the National Sevens Circuit and other competitions such as the Great Rift 10-A-Side rugby tournament which many clubs take part in.

The East African Bamburi Rugby Super Series also takes place in Kenya. With a franchised system, players from different clubs join producing a higher quality of rugby.

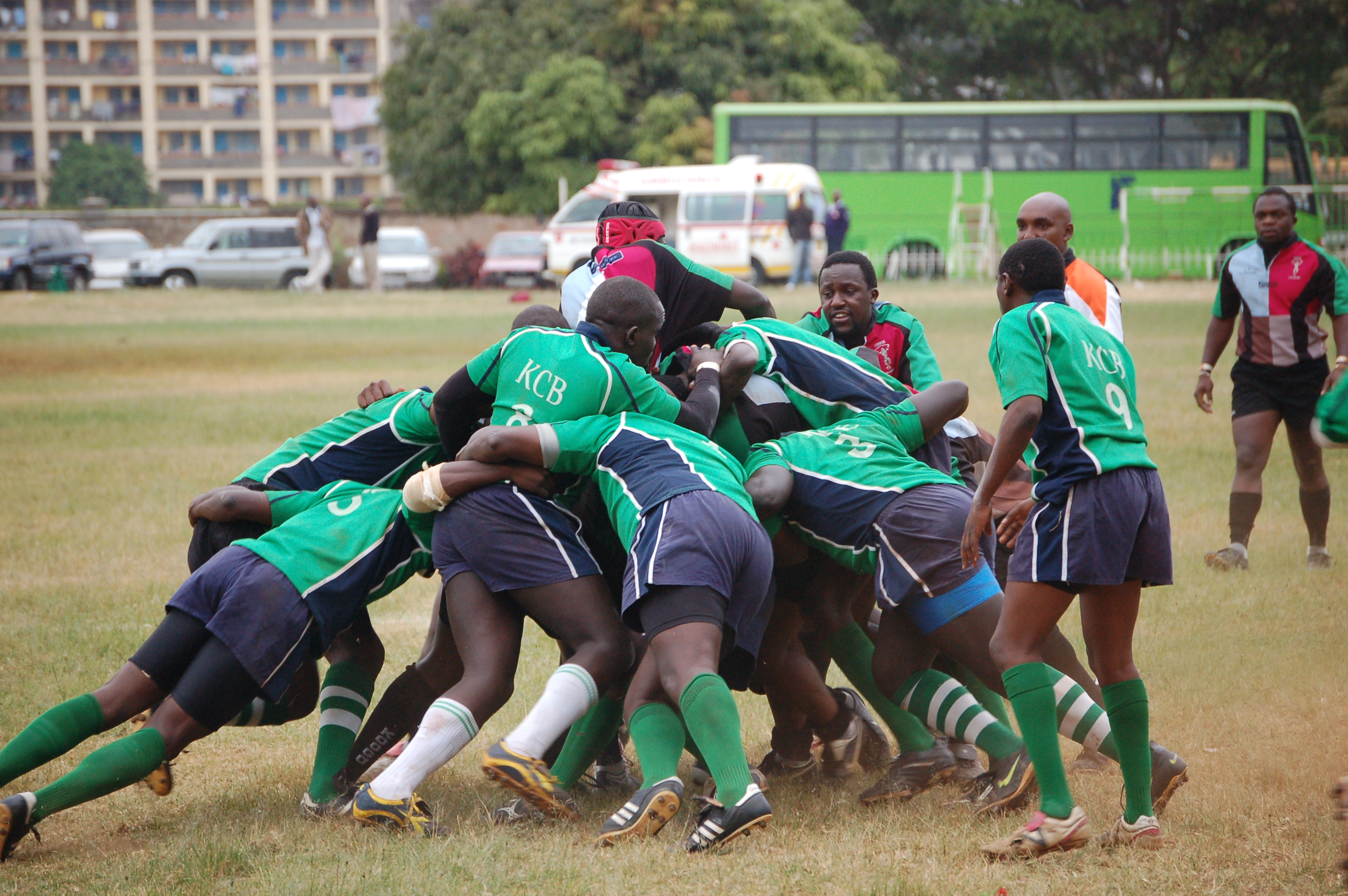
A maul during a Kenya Cup match between KCB and Kenya Harlequins.

Kenya Cup teams 2021

Team	Location	Stadium	Capacity
Kenya Harlequin F.C.	Nairobi	RFUEA Ground	6,000
Menengai Oilers	Nakuru City	Nakuru Showgrounds	6,000
Blak Blad RFC	Nairobi City	Kenyatta University Grounds	5,000
Kabras Sugar RFC	Kakamega City	Bull Ring Kakamega	5,000
Nondescripts RFC	Nairobi	Ngong Race Course	5,000
Impala Saracens	Nairobi City	Impala Ground	2,000
KCB RFC	Nairobi	The Den	2,000
Mwamba RFC	Nairobi	Nairobi Railways Club	2,000
Top Fry Nakuru RFC	Nakuru	Nakuru Athletic Club	2,000
MMUST RFC	Kakamega City	MMUST Grounds	1,000
Strathmore Leos	Nairobi	Strathmore University Grounds	1,000

== Stadiums used for rugby union in Kenya ==
A minimum capacity of 5,000 is required for this list.

Rank	Stadium	City	Capacity	Tenants	Image
1	Moi International Sports Centre Stadium	Nairobi	55,000		
2	William Ole Ntimama Stadium	Narok	20,000		
3	Jomo Kenyatta International Stadium	Kisumu	15,000		
4	Nyayo National Stadium	Nairobi	15,000		
5	RFUEA Ground	Nairobi	6,000	Kenya Harlequin F.C.	
6	Nakuru Showgrounds	Nakuru	6,000	Menengai Oilers	
7	Kenyatta University Grounds	Nairobi	6,000	Blak Blad RFC	
8	Bull Ring Kakamega	Kakamega	5,000	Kabras Sugar RFC	
9	Ngong Race Course	Nairobi	5,000	Nondescripts RFC	

== See also ==
- Lists of stadiums

== Bibliography ==
- Cotton, Fran (Ed.) (1984) The Book of Rugby Disasters & Bizarre Records. Compiled by Chris Rhys. London. Century Publishing. ISBN 0-7126-0911-3
- Richards, Huw A Game for Hooligans: The History of Rugby Union (Mainstream Publishing, Edinburgh, 2007, ISBN 978-1-84596-255-5)
- Thomas, Clem; Thomas, Greg (2001). The History of The British and Irish Lions. Mainstream Books. ISBN 1-84018-498-1.
