= Rugby union in the Gambia =

Rugby union in the Gambia is a minor but growing sport.

== History ==
Rugby union was introduced into the Gambia by the British, who ruled the country for a number of years. However, it was mainly played by the white population, who made little attempt to spread it to the native Gambians, meaning that the game declined when they left.

In 1987 Warrant Officer Sergeant Major Hulme of the British Army Training Team (BATT) introduced the Gambian National Army (GNA) to the game, and the then vice President of the Gambia was invited to become president of the National Rugby Team, games were played at the Medical Research Council (MRC) in Fajara. As well playing teams in the region visiting Royal Navy ships also provided competition for the Gambian rugby team. The team was made up mainly by Gambian Army personnel along with some expats.

Rugby is centred on the national capitals, and main cities, Banjul and Serrekunda, both of which are on the south coast. The Gambia is a slender country, and its poverty and lack of infrastructure make it difficult to maintain a proper national league structure. Unlike the politics of many other Subsaharan Countries, however, Gambia has been relatively stable.

The country is surrounded on three sides by Senegal. Rugby union in Senegal is relatively popular.

However, the Gambia has long been a popular tourist destination with Europeans, so it is possible that this may influence the development of the game in future.

== See also ==
- Gambia national rugby union team
- Confederation of African Rugby
- Africa Cup
