= Stade Lausanne Rugby Club =

Swiss rugby union club, based in Lausanne

(Switzerland) Stade Lausanne Rugby Club
- Full name: Stade Lausanne Rugby Club
- Union: Fédération Suisse de Rugby
- Founded: 1969; 57 years ago
- Location: Lausanne, Switzerland
- Ground(s): Lausanne; Chavannes - Centre sportif
- President: (South Africa) Andrew Cummins
- Coach: (Italy) Mario Bucciarelli
- League(s): Swiss LNA; Swiss Excellence A
Team kit

Official website
- stadelausannerugby.wixsite.com/slrc

Stade Lausanne Rugby Club is an amateur Swiss rugby union club from Lausanne, the Olympic Capital. The club plays in the Swiss first division - LNA - and are former Swiss Cup champions.

== Club history ==
Having been one of the eight original clubs to play in the inaugural Swiss Championship when the Switzerland Rugby Union was formed in 1969, Stade Lausanne has been one of the most successful clubs in the country. With six National League A (NLA) and six Swiss Cup titles including 2009 and 2010 Stade Lausanne sits third - behind Hermance RRC and Rugby Club CERN on the National overall club honors list and is the most successful club in Lausanne and canton Vaud. In the 2010/2011 season the First team marched into the Swiss final against RC Avusy and finished 2nd in the first division and the Second team got promoted to the second division of the Swiss Rugby Union.

== Club honours ==
Competitions	Years
Swiss Champions (NLA)	1975, 1976, 1981, 1983, 1985, 1986
Swiss Cup	1981, 1982, 1984, 1986, 2009, 2010
Second Division Champions (NLB)	2005, 2007, 2008, 2015

== See also ==
- Rugby union in Switzerland
- Swiss Rugby Federation
