= Matthew McNab =

Zimbabwean rugby union player (born 1998)

- Born: 8 June 1998 (age 28) Bulawayo, Zimbabwe
- Height: 1.87 m (6 ft 1 1/2 in)
- Weight: 99 kg (15.6 st; 218 lb)
- School: Falcon College
- University: Hartpury University

Rugby union career
- Position: Centre / Wing
- Current team: Doncaster Knights
Senior career
Years	Team	Apps	(Points)
2019	Zimbabwe Academy	6	(0)
2020–2023	Hartpury University	25	(30)
2022	→ Worcester Warriors (loan)	1	(0)
2022–2023	Zimbabwe Goshawks	3	(0)
2023-2025	Cornish Pirates	52	(150)
2025-26	Doncaster Knights	14	(25)
2026-	Coventry	1	(5)
- Correct as of 31 May 2025
International career
Years	Team	Apps	(Points)
2018–	Zimbabwe	25	(40)
- Correct as of 19 July 2025

Matthew McNab (born 8 June 1998) is a Zimbabwe rugby union player, currently playing for Coventry in England's Elior Champ. His preferred position is centre or wing. He is the son of Zimbabwe mountainbiker Lee McNab who raced at the 2007 UCI African Mountain Bike Championships

== Professional career ==
McNab represented Zimbabwe Academy in the 2019 Rugby Challenge. He was then named in the Zimbabwe Goshawks squad for the 2022 Currie Cup First Division. He joined Hartpury University in 2020, and joined Worcester Warriors on loan in 2022.

McNab signed a one-year Cornish Pirates in the RFU Championship - England's second division - ahead of the 2023-24 season. McNab quickly established himself as one of the best players in the league, scoring 13 tries in 26 games across the Championship and Premiership Rugby Cup as well as being selected in the Championship's Team of the Season. He was also voted Cornish Pirates' Supporters Player of the Season. After agreeing a one-year contract extension, McNab had an equally strong 2024-25 season, overcoming injury problems to score 14 tries in the league and rank as its 5th top try-scorer as well as making his second consecutive appearance in the league's Team of the Season.

After 52 appearances and 30 tries for the Pirates, McNab signed for Doncaster Knights ahead of the 2025-26 season.

== International career ==
Having played consistently for Zimbabwe's age-grade sides, McNab made his full international debut against Morocco in Zimbabwe's 2018 Rugby Africa Gold Cup campaign, going on to play in each of Zimbabwe's five matches and scoring one try against Kenya. He returned to the side in the 2021-22 Africa Cup, playing in each of Zimbabwe's five matches and scoring six tries, including a brace and a hat-trick in consecutive matches against Burkina Faso.

After Zimbabwe's failed 2023 Rugby World Cup qualification campaign, McNab took time away from international rugby, initially as Zimbabwe did not compete in test rugby at all in 2023, and then due to his move to play club rugby in England for Cornish Pirates. After two successful seasons with the Pirates, in both of which McNab was selected in the RFU Championship team of the season, McNab agreed a move to Doncaster Knights and returned to Zimbabwe's squad for their 2025 Rugby Africa Cup campaign. McNab started in Zimbabwe's semi-final and final wins against Kenya and Namibia respectively as Zimbabwe became African champions and qualified for the 2027 World Cup, marking the country's first appearance at the World Cup since 1991.

=== International tries ===
As of 19 July 2025

Try	Opposing team	Location	Venue	Competition	Date	Result	Score
1	Kenya	Nairobi, Kenya	RFUEA Ground	2018 Rugby Africa Gold Cup	30 June 2018	Loss	36 – 45
2	Burkina Faso	Harare, Zimbabwe	Old Georgians RFC	2021 Rugby Africa Cup	18 July 2021	Win	101 – 3
3	Burkina Faso	Harare, Zimbabwe	Old Georgians RFC	2021 Rugby Africa Cup	18 July 2021	Win	101 – 3
4	Burkina Faso	Harare, Zimbabwe	Old Georgians RFC	2021 Rugby Africa Cup	22 July 2021	Win	95 – 5
5	Burkina Faso	Harare, Zimbabwe	Old Georgians RFC	2021 Rugby Africa Cup	22 July 2021	Win	95 – 5
6	Burkina Faso	Harare, Zimbabwe	Old Georgians RFC	2021 Rugby Africa Cup	22 July 2021	Win	95 – 5
7	Netherlands	Amsterdam, The Netherlands	NRCA Stadium	2022 mid-year tests	25 June 2022	Win	30 – 7
8	Ivory Coast	Marseille, France	Stade Delort	2022 Rugby Africa Cup	1 July 2022	Win	38 – 11
