= Stade de Genève =

Football stadium in Lancy, Switzerland

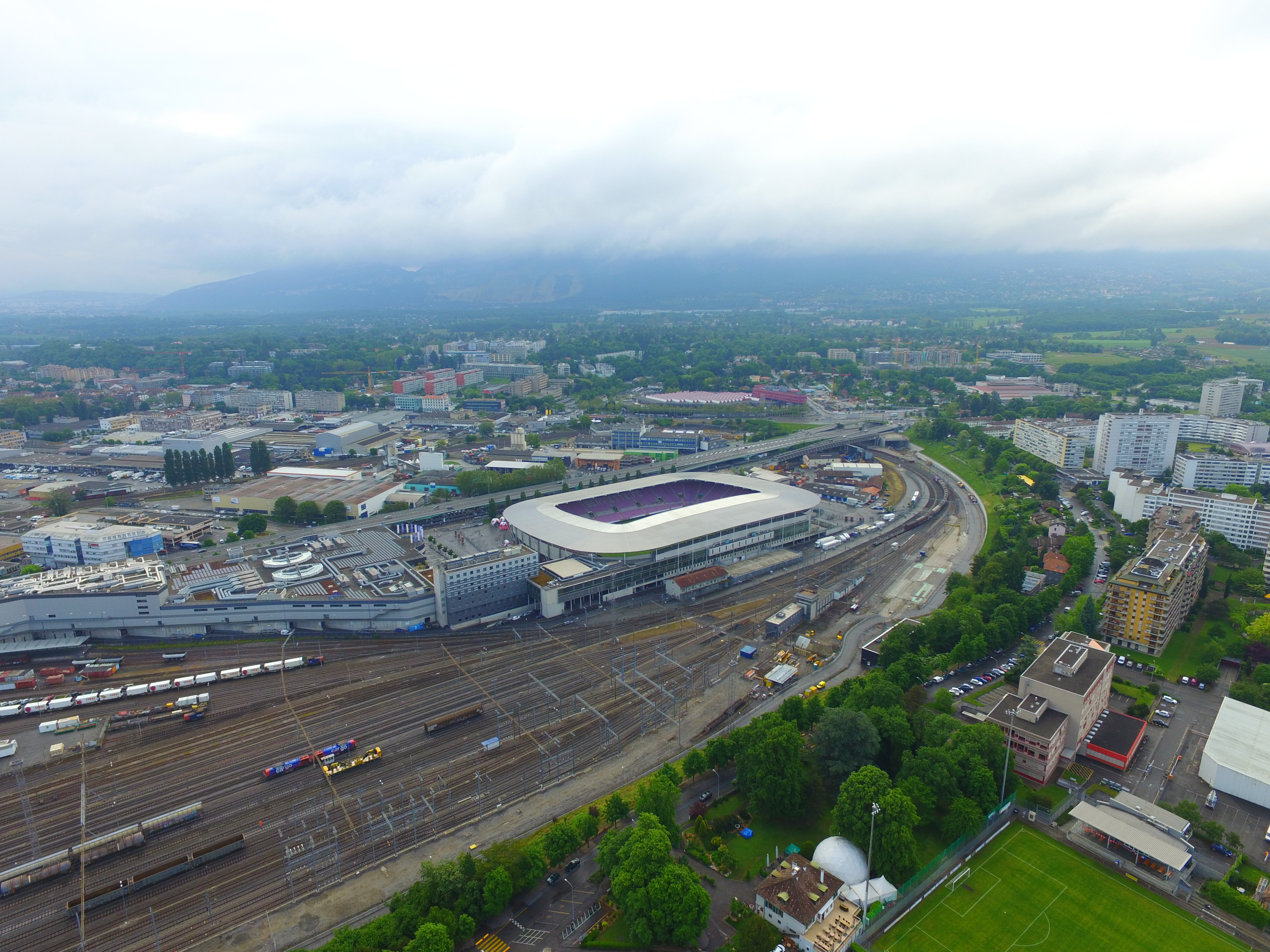
- Interactive map of Stade de Genève
- Location: Lancy, Switzerland
- Coordinates: 46°10′40″N 6°7′39″E
- Owner: Fondation du Stade de Genève
- Capacity: 30,084
- Surface: Mixto Hybrid Grass

Construction
- Built: 2001–2003
- Opened: 30 April 2003
- Renovated: 2019–2020
- Cost: CHF 240 million (2003)
- General contractor: Zschokke Construction S.A.

Tenants
- Servette FC (2003–present); Switzerland national football team

Stade de Genève (Stadium of Geneva), also called Stade de la Praille, is a stadium in Lancy, Canton of Geneva. It has a capacity of 30,084.

== Overview ==
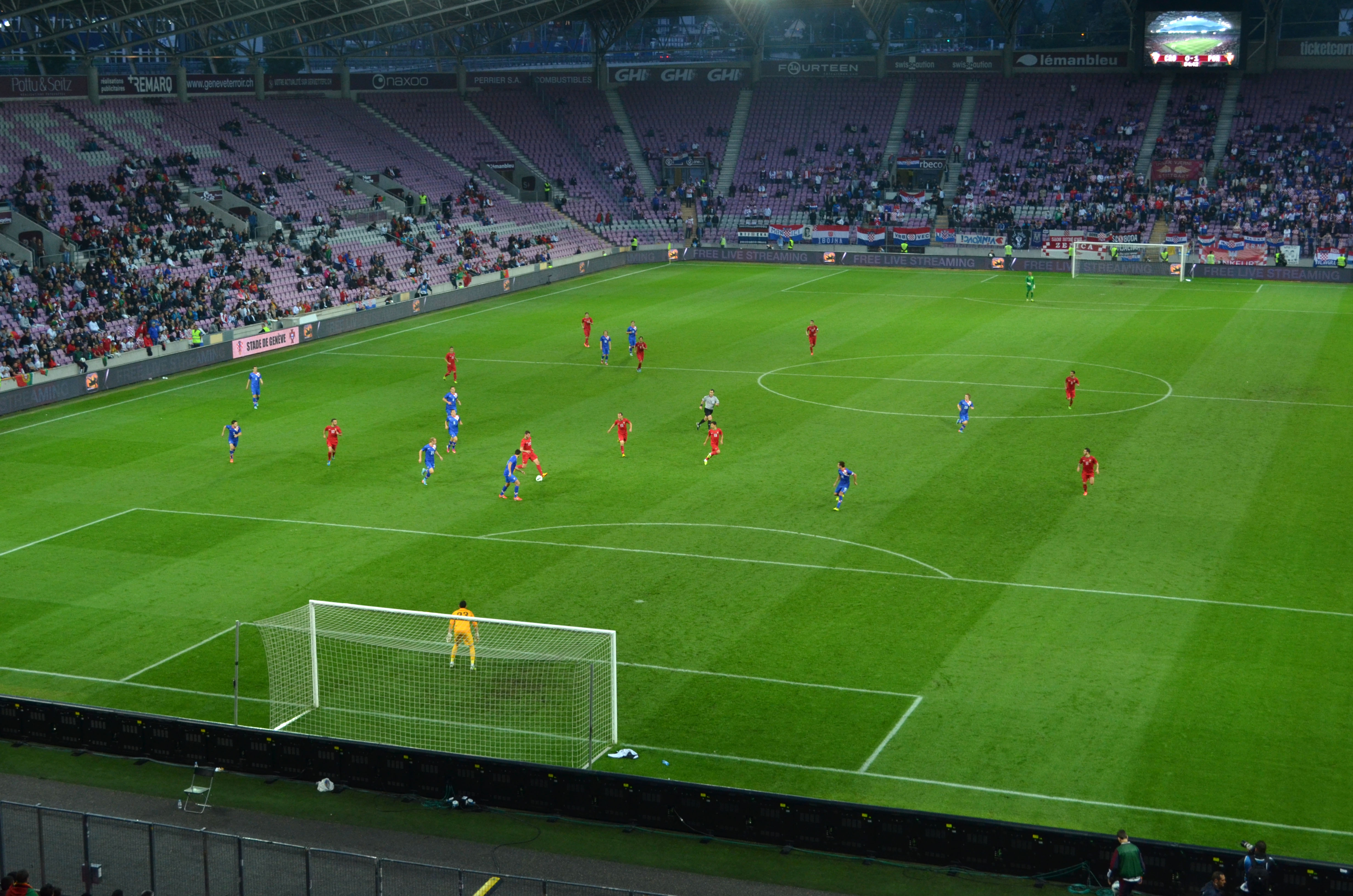
Portugal vs Croatia, 10 June 2013

The stadium was completed in 2003 by Zschokke Construction S.A. after nearly three years of construction. Normally the home venue of Geneva's Servette FC, a Swiss football team, the stadium hosted international friendlies between Argentina and England on 12 November 2005, which England won 3–2 and between New Zealand and Brazil on 4 June 2006, which Brazil won 4–0. The venue played host to three group-stage matches for Group A during UEFA Euro 2008.

A memorable match Turkey-Czech Republic was played in this stadium. The stadium was also used for rugby union, with a 2006–07 Heineken Cup clash between Bourgoin and Munster being moved from Bourgoin's home ground.

In the summer of 2016 the stadium was equipped with heated hybrid turf, Mixto Hybrid Grass by Limonta Sport to cater the needs of football and rugby clubs of Servette. Installation of the new turf prevented Servette FC from playing home on the first three rounds of the 2016–17 Swiss Challenge League.

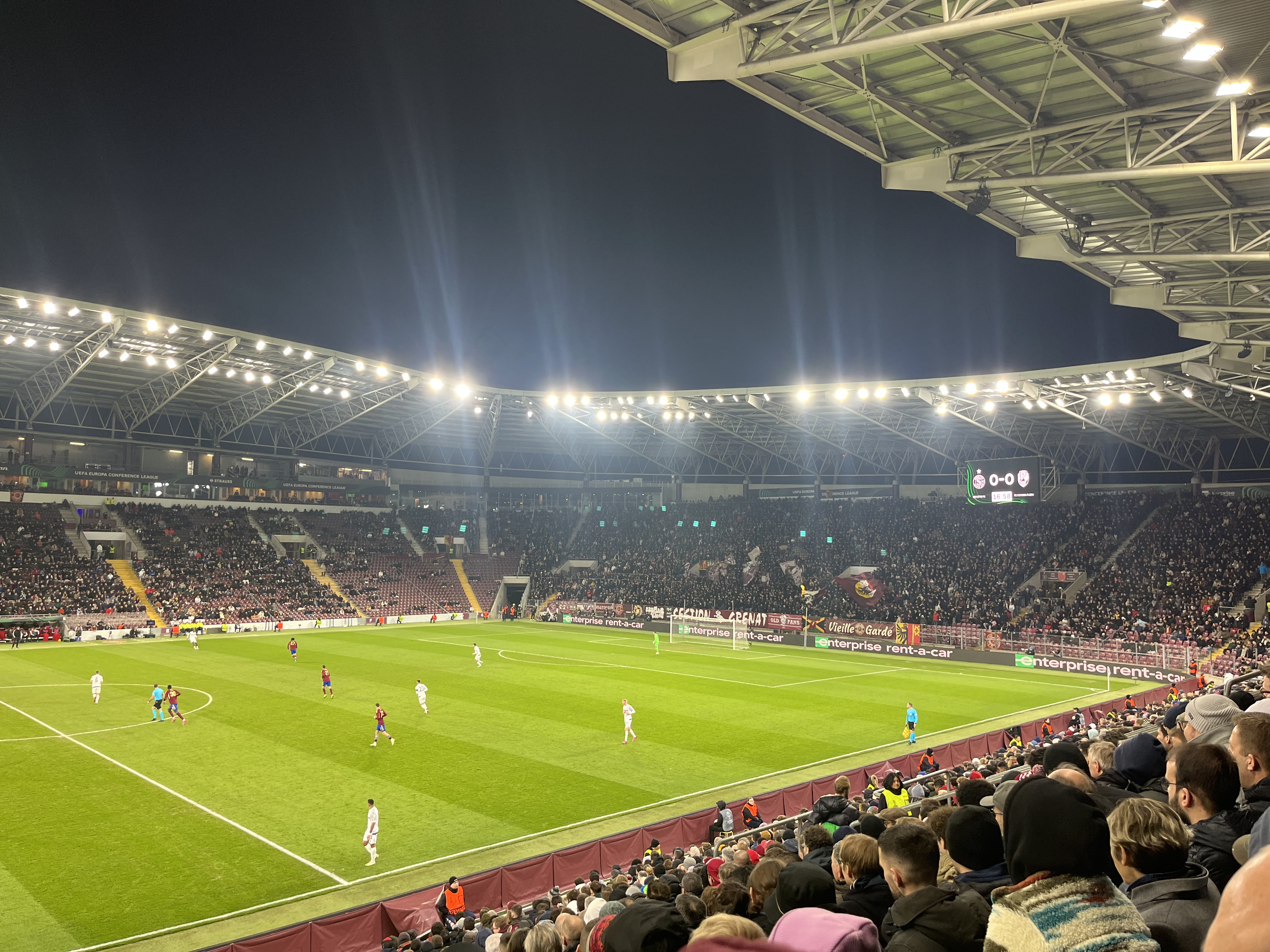
The Stade de Genève during a UEFA Europa Conference League match between Servette and Viktoria Plzeň in 2023

Throughout the 2019–20 season, all 30,000 seats were replaced with brand new burgundy seats as the old ones had completely faded to a pink/grey color. In addition to that, a small portion of the North stand was left without seats to provide a new standing section for about 500 fans.

The stadium hosted the semi-finals and final of the 2022–23 UEFA Youth League.

== NLA Winter Classic ==
On 11 January 2014, the National League A played its second Winter Classic (the first one was held on 14 January 2007 at the Stade de Suisse, Wankdorf). The game featured Genève-Servette HC and Lausanne HC and was played in front of a sellout crowd of 29,400 (the capacity being reduced to 29,400 for security and visibility concerns).

== Matches ==
=== UEFA Euro 2008 ===
The stadium was one of the venues for the UEFA Euro 2008.

The following games were played at the stadium during the UEFA Euro 2008:

Date	Time (CEST)	Team #1	Res.	Team #2	Round	Spectators
7 June 2008	20:45	Portugal	2–0	Turkey	Group A	29,016
11 June 2008	18:00	Czech Republic	1-3	Portugal	Group A	29,016
15 June 2008	20:45	Turkey	3–2	Czech Republic	Group A	29,016

=== UEFA Women's Euro 2025 ===
The stadium was one of the venues for the UEFA Women's Euro 2025.

The following games were played at the stadium during the UEFA Women's Euro 2025:

Date	Time (CEST)	Team #1	Res.	Team #2	Round	Spectators
4 July 2025	18:00	Denmark	0–1	Sweden	Group C	17,319
7 July 2025	21:00	Portugal	1–1	Italy	Group B	22,713
10 July 2025	21:00	Finland	1–1	Switzerland	Group A	26,388
16 July 2025	21:00	Norway	1–2	Italy	Quarter-finals	26,276
22 July 2025	21:00	England	2–1	Italy	Semi-finals	26,539

=== International matches ===
Date	Team #1	Result	Team #2	Competition
30 March 2003	Switzerland	1–2	Italy	Friendly
11 June 2003	Switzerland	3–2	Albania	UEFA Euro 2004 qualifying
20 August 2003	Switzerland	0–2	France	Friendly
28 April 2004	Switzerland	2–1	Slovenia	Friendly
12 November 2005	England	3–2	Argentina	Friendly
16 November 2005	Italy	1–1	Ivory Coast	Friendly
31 May 2006	Switzerland	1–1	Italy	Friendly
4 June 2006	Brazil	4–0	New Zealand	Friendly
7 June 2006	Spain	2–1	Croatia	Friendly
2 September 2006	Austria	2–2	Costa Rica	Friendly
6 September 2006	Switzerland	2–0	Costa Rica	Friendly
22 August 2007	Switzerland	2–1	Netherlands	Friendly
20 August 2008	Switzerland	4–1	Cyprus	Friendly
11 February 2009	Switzerland	1–1	Bulgaria	Friendly
1 April 2009	Switzerland	2–0	Moldova	2010 World Cup Qualification
14 November 2009	Switzerland	0–1	Norway	Friendly
5 June 2010	Switzerland	1–1	Italy	Friendly
17 November 2010	Switzerland	2–2	Ukraine	Friendly
9 February 2011	Argentina	2–1	Portugal	Friendly
10 August 2011	Ivory Coast	4–3	Israel	Friendly
14 November 2012	Albania	0–0	Cameroon	Friendly
21 March 2013	Italy	2–2	Brazil	Friendly
8 June 2013	Switzerland	1–0	Cyprus	2014 World Cup Qualification
10 June 2013	Croatia	0–1	Portugal	Friendly
10 September 2013	Spain	2–2	Chile	Friendly
25 May 2014	Kosovo	1–3	Senegal	Friendly
4 June 2014	Algeria	2–1	Romania	Friendly
16 June 2015	Italy	0–1	Portugal	Friendly
28 May 2016	Switzerland	1–2	Belgium	Friendly
25 March 2017	Switzerland	1–0	Latvia	2018 World Cup Qualification
26 March 2018	Portugal	0–3	Netherlands	Friendly
31 May 2018	Morocco	0–0	Ukraine	Friendly
1 June 2018	Tunisia	2–2	Turkey	Friendly
4 June 2018	Morocco	2–1	Slovakia	Friendly
15 October 2019	Switzerland	2–0	Republic of Ireland	UEFA Euro 2020 qualification
9 October 2021	Switzerland	2–0	Northern Ireland	2022 World Cup Qualification
9 June 2022	Switzerland	0–1	Spain	2022–23 UEFA Nations League A
12 June 2022	Switzerland	1–0	Portugal	2022–23 UEFA Nations League A
28 March 2023	Switzerland	3–0	Israel	UEFA Euro 2024 qualification
8 September 2024	Switzerland	1–4	Spain	2024–25 UEFA Nations League A
15 November 2025	Switzerland	4–1	Sweden	2026 World Cup Qualification

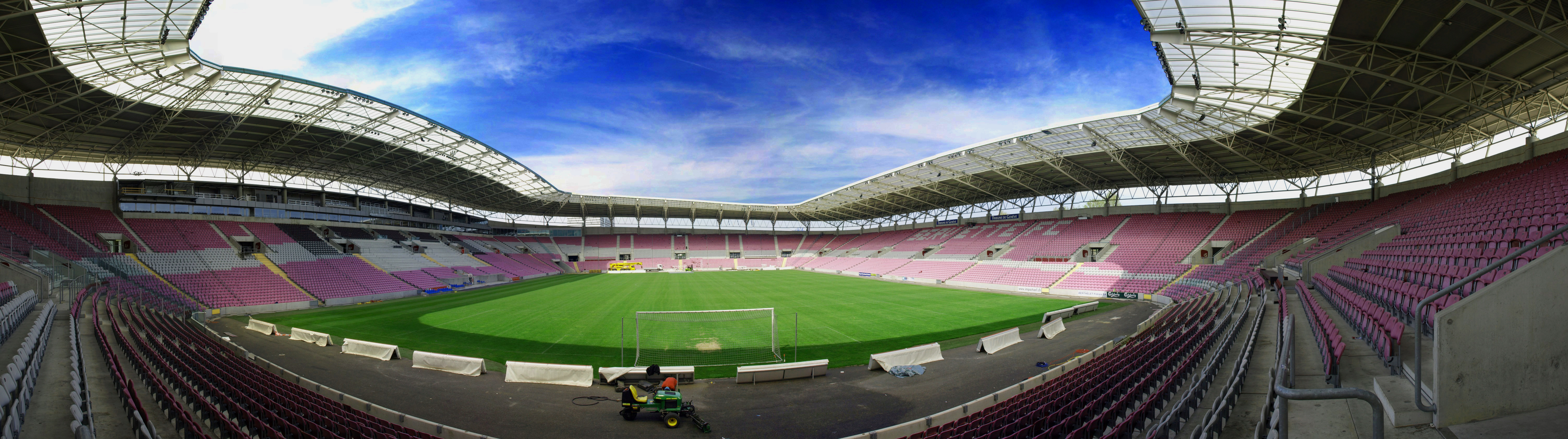
Stade de Genève

== See also ==
- List of football stadiums in Switzerland
- Rugby union in Switzerland
