= 2023 Rugby World Cup qualifying =

Championship qualifying matches

Tournament details
- Dates: 6 March 2021 – 18 November 2022
- No. of nations: 37

The qualification process for the 2023 Rugby World Cup in France began during the pool stages of the 2019 tournament in Japan, at which the top three teams from each of the four pools qualified automatically for the 2023 event. A further eight teams qualified through regional, cross-regional play-offs and the repechage process.

The qualifying matches began on 5 June 2021, when Burkina Faso defeated Burundi 52–3 in the first round of the African Qualification. The qualification process concluded in November 2022 with the Final Qualification Tournament.

== Qualified teams ==
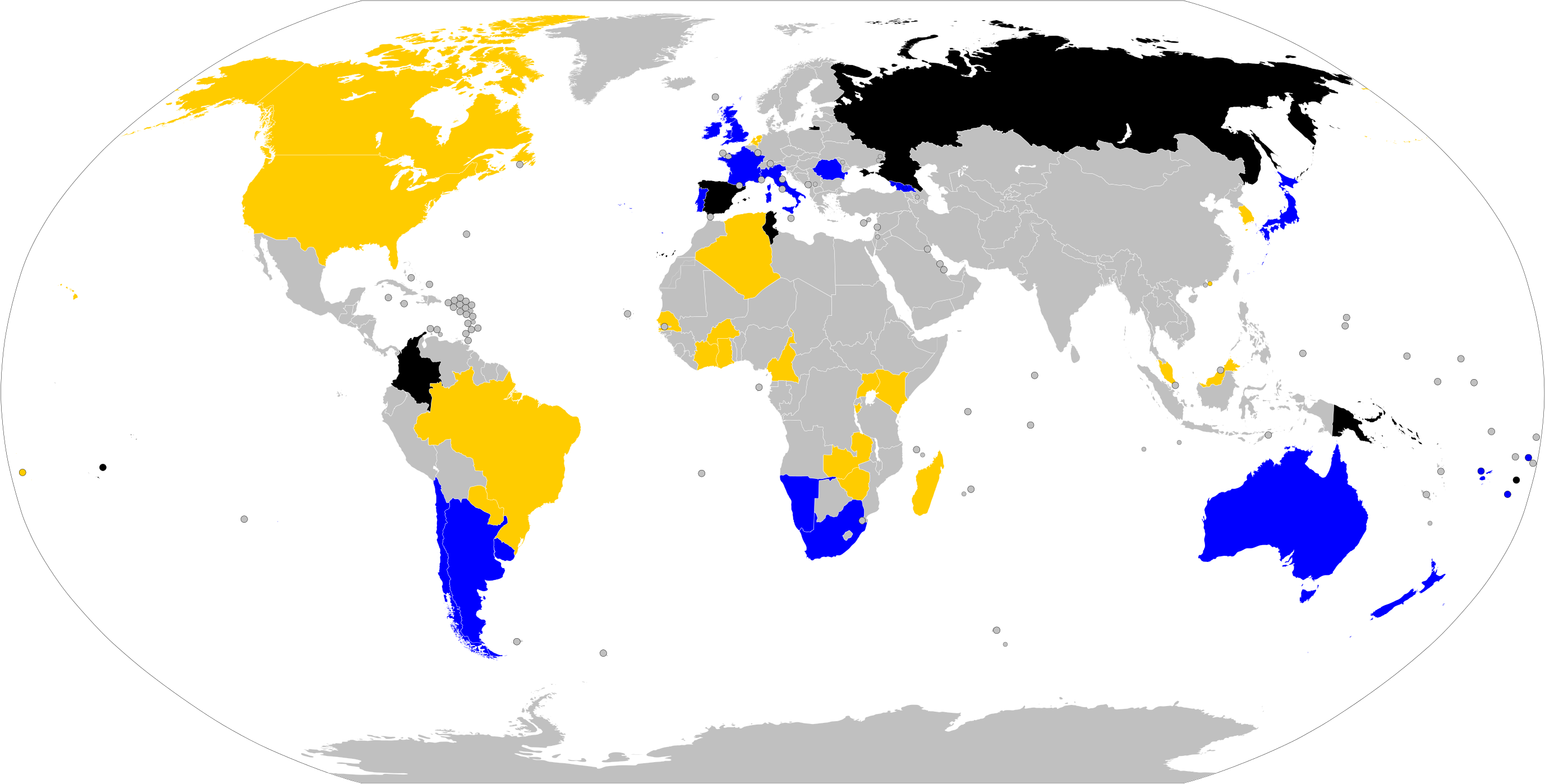
Qualification status: Qualified for the 2023 Rugby World Cup. Failed to qualify. Withdrew or suspended.

Region	Automatic qualifiers	Continental qualifiers	Play-off / Final Qualification Tournament qualifiers	Total teams
Africa	South Africa (holders)	Namibia (Africa 1)	—	2
Americas	Argentina	Uruguay (Americas 1); Chile (Americas 2)	—	3
Asia	Japan	—	—	1
Europe	England; France (host); Ireland; Italy; Scotland; Wales	Georgia (Europe 1); Romania (Europe 2)	Portugal (Final qualifier)	9
Oceania	Australia; New Zealand; Fiji	Samoa (Oceania 1)	Tonga (Asia/Pacific 1)	5
Totals	12	6	2	20

== Qualification process ==
Following confirmation of the twelve automatically qualified teams from the 2019 Rugby World Cup, World Rugby announced the qualification format for the eight remaining places on 8 June 2020. Of the eight berths remaining, six are to be decided in regional tournaments, one by a cross-regional playoff and the last one via a final qualification tournament.

=== Africa ===
Rugby Africa was granted one place at the world cup, which was awarded to the winners of the 2022 Africa Cup (Africa 1), after a three-round phased process. The runner-up (Africa 2) advanced to the Final Qualification Tournament as Africa 2.

=== Americas ===
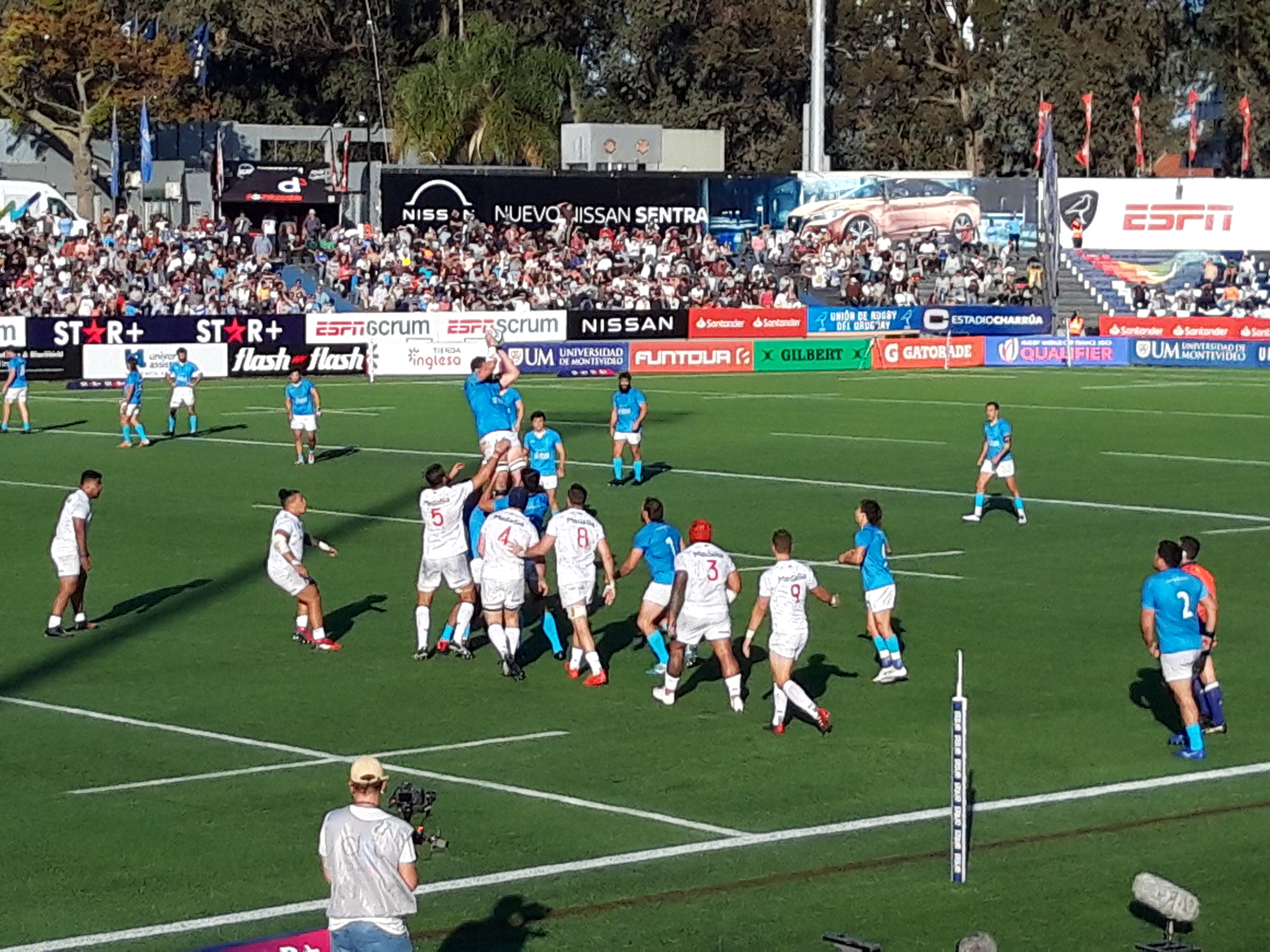
Uruguay vs United States

The Americas was awarded two qualifying berths, decided by several play-off matches across both North America and South America. Americas 1 was awarded to the winner of round 3; where North America 1 (the winner of a United States-Canada play-off series) v South America 1 (the winner of SAR 3 Nations Championship) played each other, with the winner on aggregate qualifying for the World Cup.

Americas 2 were the winners on aggregate in a final play-off series between the runners-up of round 3 and the winners of a play-off series between North America 2 and South Americas 2. The loser of the final play-off series progressed to the Final Qualification Tournament as Americas 3.

=== Asia ===
Asia Rugby, with its top-ranked team automatically qualified already, did not get another direct qualifying place. However, the 2021 Asia Rugby Championship (later delayed to 2022) winner (Asia 1) will have the chance to qualify via a cross-regional play-off against Oceania 2 (Tonga).

=== Europe ===
Rugby Europe, having six teams automatically qualified, gained a further two more world cup berths, which were awarded to the winners and runners-up of a combined 2021–2022 Rugby Europe Championship (Europe 1 and Europe 2) table. The third-placed team advanced to the Final Qualification Tournament as Europe 3.

=== Oceania ===
Oceania Rugby was granted one direct qualification berth, and was awarded to the winner on aggregate of a Samoa–Tonga home and away play-off (Oceania 1). The loser, Tonga, then progressed to a straight play-off match against the deemed winner of the 2021 Oceania Rugby Cup (Cook Islands), which Tonga won to advance as Oceania 2 to a cross-regional play-off against Asia 1.

=== Play-off and Final Qualification Tournament ===
Following the regional tournaments, the next qualification stage was a single-leg qualification match between Asia 1 (Hong Kong) and Oceania 2 (Tonga), with the winner (Tonga) qualifying for the 2023 Rugby World Cup as Asia/Pacific 1. Hong Kong advanced to the Final Qualification Tournament as Asia/Pacific 2.

The final stage of the qualification process concluded in November 2022 with a four-teamed round-robin format Final Qualification Tournament.

The four teams were:

- Kenya (Africa 2)
- United States (Americas 3)
- Portugal (Europe 3)
- Hong Kong (Asia/Pacific 2)

Portugal won the final Qualifier and joined Pool C of the 2023 World Cup.
