= UMB Rugby Lugano =

UMB Rugby Lugano is a rugby union Swiss club that plays in the Swiss LNA, highest rugby competition in Switzerland.

Alessandro Borghetti is the manager of the team and Alessandro Serventi is the captain of the 2015-2016 squad.

The second team of the UMB Rugby Lugano plays in first league east as rules of Swiss rugby that every team in the highest league must have a second team in the lower leagues.
