= Claude Ezoua =

French-born Ivorian rugby union footballer and coach

Claude-Aimé Ezoua (born 2 October 1956) is a French-born Ivorian rugby union coach and a former player.

He was called to be Ivory Coast head coach and achieved a surprise qualification for the 1995 Rugby World Cup. The Ivorians played rather poorly in their opening match, losing to Scotland by 89-0, but performed better the following match, losing by 54-18 to France, in a game where they scored two tries. They had a closer result with Tonga, losing by 29-11, but the game was marked by tragedy due to the accident that hit player Max Brito. Ezoua left the national team after the tournament.

He continued his coach career aftwards and was coach of Swiss Rugby Club CERN since 2007/08 to 2009/10, managing to reach the First Division in his first season. He has been head coach of Rwanda since January 2018.
