= Victor Kouassi =

- Born: July 20, 1971 (age 55) Abidjan

Rugby union career
- Position: Fullback
Amateur team(s)
Years	Team	Apps	(Points)
- Burotic Abidjan
International career
Years	Team	Apps	(Points)
1993-1995	Ivory Coast	4	(8)

Victor Kouassi (born 20 July 1971 in Abidjan) is a former Ivorian rugby union player. He played as a fullback.

Kouassi played for Burotic Abidjan in Ivory Coast. He had four caps for Ivory Coast, from 1993 to 1995. He was called for the 1995 Rugby World Cup, playing all the three matches and scoring a conversion and two penalties, eight points in aggregate. He was the top scorer for Côte d'Ivoire in their first World Cup presence. He would not be called once more for his National Team.
