= Abdelatif Benazzi =

France & Morocco international rugby union player

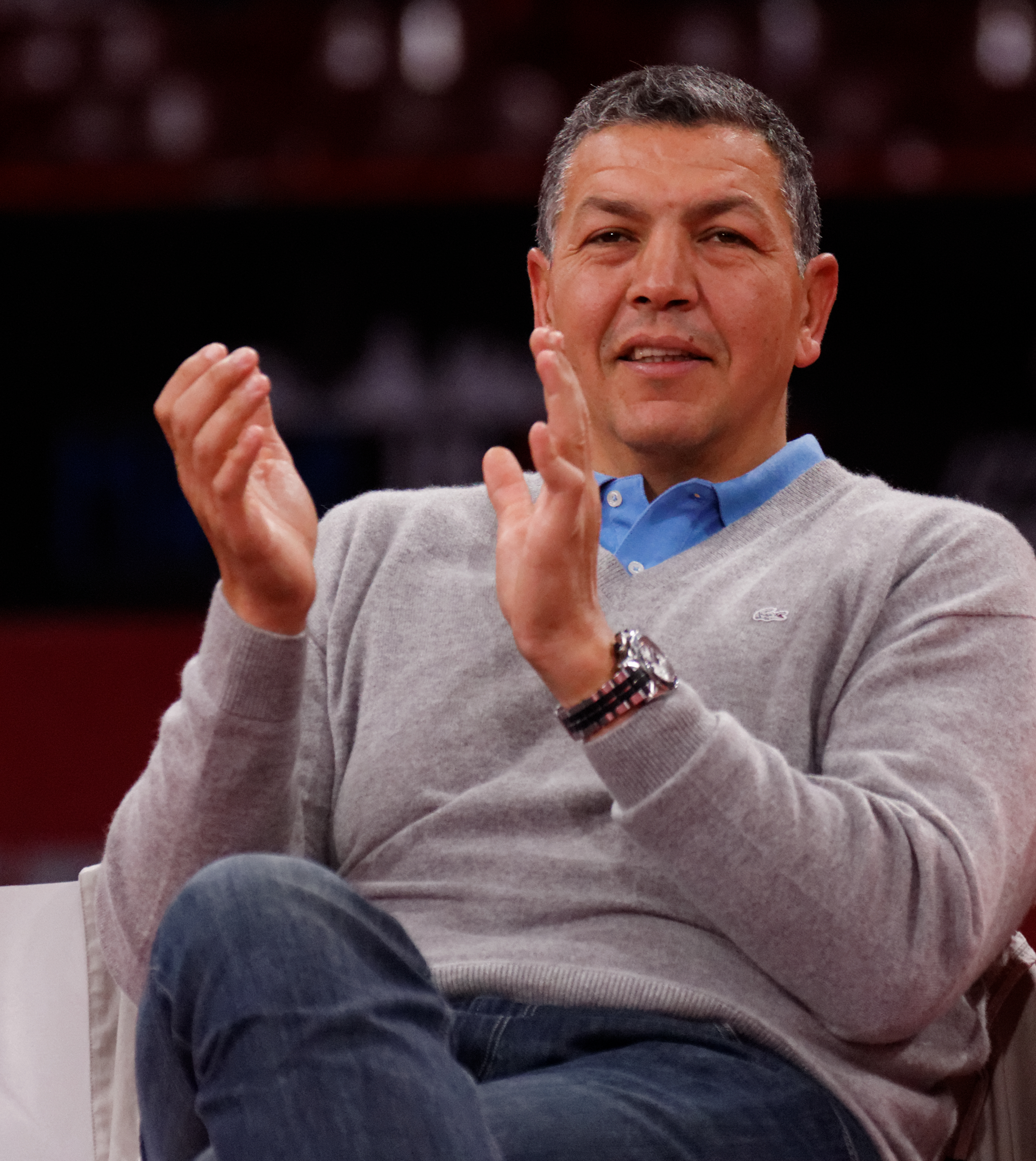
- Benazzi at the 2013 World Table Tennis Championships, Paris
- Born: 20 August 1968 (age 58) Oujda, Morocco
- Height: 1.97 m (6 ft 5 1/2 in)
- Weight: 112 kg (17 st 9 lb)

Rugby union career
- Position: Number eight
Senior career
Years	Team	Apps	(Points)
1988–1989	Cahors		
1989–2001	Agen		
2001–2003	Saracens		
International career
Years	Team	Apps	(Points)
1990	Morocco	1	(0)
1990–2001	France	78	(45)

Abdelatif Benazzi (Arabic: عبد اللطيف بن عزي; born 20 August 1968) is a French-Moroccan rugby union player who represented both Morocco and France. He played as a lock or back row forward.

Abdel Benazzi started out with his homeland Morocco, but his ability was quickly spotted by France's selectors. He won his first France cap in 1990 against Australia and went on to make 78 appearances and score nine tries for Les Bleus. He played in three World Cups and was a member of the France team that reached the 1999 Rugby World Cup final. He was twice a Grand Slam winner and led Les Bleus in the 1997 tournament. His last international appearance was on 7 April 2001 against England.

He finished his club career with Saracens in England, retiring in 2003 ahead of his 35th birthday.

== Honours ==
International Rugby Board awards

- World Rugby Hall of Fame Inductee Number 182: 2026

== See also ==
- Rugby union in Morocco
