= Athanase Dali =

Ivorian rugby union player (born 1967)

- Born: September 9, 1967 (age 59)

Rugby union career
- Position: Fly-half
International career
Years	Team	Apps	(Points)
1993-1995	Ivory Coast	7	(31)

Athanase Dali (born 9 September 1967) is a former Ivorian rugby union player. He played as a fly-half.

The son of François Dali, the main introducer of rugby in Côte d'Ivoire, he graduated in Journalism in France in 1995. He played for Clamart Rugby 92 in France.

He had 7 caps for Côte d'Ivoire, scoring 2 conversions, 8 penalties and 1 drop goal, 31 points in aggregate. His debut was at 26 October 1993 in the 19-16 win over Tunisia in Tunes for the 1995 Rugby World Cup qualifiers, in a game where he scored a conversion, three penalties and one drop goal. After the surprising qualification of Côte d'Ivoire for the 1995 Rugby World Cup, he was the captain in their first game, an 89-0 loss to Scotland. He missed the following game and returned, as a substitute for the 29-11 loss to Tonga, at 3 June 1995, in Rustenburg, scoring two penalties. It would be his last game for his National Team.
