= Stade Delort =

Stadium in Marseille, France

- Location within France
- Full name: Stade Pierre-Delort
- Address: 72 Rue Raymond Teisseire 13009 Marseille, Provence-Alpes-Côte d'Azur, France
- Coordinates: 43.269°N 5.399°E
- Owner: City of Marseille
- Capacity: 5,000

Construction
- Renovated: 2014

Tenant
- Blue Stars de Marseille

The Stade Pierre-Delort is a multi-purpose stadium located in Marseille, France. It is located between the Stade Vélodrome and the Huveaune. The stadium hosts rugby matches, athletics competitions, and is the home ground of American football club Blue Stars de Marseille.

== History ==
Recent reconfiguration work with that of the Stade Velodrome adds value to this sector of the city and groups together Stade Velodrome, the Sports Palace, and Delort Stadium.

Its capacity is currently 5,000 people.

Its main features are the presence of a rugby field with natural grass and which is approved to receive the level of rugby competitions Pro D2 and TOP 14. There is also an athletics track around the green square and three covered stands with a total capacity of 5,000 seating places. The stadium has a grandstand with a capacity of 2,300 including hospitalities, seats, locker rooms, dressing rooms, and offices. There are also two covered stands of modular metal of 1,200 to 1,300 seating capacity, the first at the eastern corner of the stadium and the second at the western corner of the level. Capacity may occasionally pass 5,000 to 15,000 places if needed.
