= Nyon Rugby Club =

(Switzerland) Nyon Rugby Club
- Founded: 1972
- Location: Nyon, Vaud, Switzerland
- Ground: Colovray
- President: Thierry Hochstrasser
- League(s): LNA, LNB, LNF

Official website
- www.nyonrugby.ch

Nyon Rugby Club is a Swiss rugby union football club based in Nyon, situated on the shores of lake Geneva between Geneva and Lausanne. The club was founded in 1972 and is a member of the l'Association des Sociétés Sportives Nyonnaises, the Association Vaudoise de Rugby and the Swiss Rugby Federation. They play their home matches at the Colovray Sports Centre which is under the management of UEFA. Since its creation, Nyon Rugby Club has won the national championship and cup several times and has provided many players to the Swiss national side

== History ==
=== Early history ===
Nyon started playing in the 2nd division (League National B) of the Swiss championship in 1972 and played their home matches in La Vuarpillière area of the town. In the late 1970s, the club moved down to the lakeside at Colovray for training sessions and home matches. The Colovray Sports Centre was re-developed in 1989 and since 2010 is under the management of UEFA (The Union of European Football Associations), which has its administrative center on site.

=== Today ===
Today, Nyon Rugby Club runs two senior men's sides, a ladies team and has a large junior section (U16 and U18) both playing in the national leagues. The men's teams and juniors sections train on Tuesday and Thursday and the ladies team (Mermaids) on Monday and Wednesday. All home matches are played at the Colovray Sports Centre.

In 2011, a veteran section ("the KromaNyon") was created for the older players (+35). They play on Wednesday evenings with a mix of touch rugby and contact.

In 2003, the rugby club joined forces with La Côte rugby club in nearby Gland, which allowed the two clubs to share resources for the development of the sport with their mini-rugby sections. Terre-Sainte Rugby School was created in 2018 in Coppet to foster the development of the sport in the region. Children between the ages of 5 and 14 train in Gland and Coppet. They then move to Nyon Rugby Club to join the junior section.

Off the field, Nyon Rugby Club contributes to community life and volunteers in many local events. Since its inception, the club has run a bar at the Paelo Festival and organized an annual loto event. In 2007, a fund raising event resulted in a donation to the pediatrics service at Nyon Hospital. The club has organized training camps for foreign professional rugby teams and in 2010 organized a match on their home ground between ASM Clermont Auvergne and CSBJ Bourgoin, a game that les Clermontois eventually won in front of 4000 spectators.

=== Honours ===
- Swiss Champions 2016/2017, 2015/2016, 2007/2008, 2004/2005, 1995/1996
- Swiss Champions LNB 1982/1983, 1972/1973
- Suisse Cup Winners 2021/2022, 2017/2018 2004/2005, 1990/1991,1983/1984
- Winners of La Coupe de la Federation 1994/1995, 1993/1992, 1986/1987, 1982/1983
- Winner Neuchatel International 7s 1991

== Presidents ==
- Thierry Hochstrasser 2021 - Present
- Fabrice Ronzier 2017 - 2021
- Jean-Pierre Pettmann 2010 - 2017
- Alain Winterhalter 2005 - 2010
- Stéphane Gaillard 2000 - 2004
- Marco Deblue 1983 - 2000
- Michel Courtois 1980 - 1982
- Hugues Boillat 1977 - 1979
- Fritz Oberli 1975 - 1976
- Claude Robert 1973 - 1974
- Gilbert Monbaron 1972
