= Aboubakar Camara =

- Born: December 26, 1965 (age 60) Bingerville

Rugby union career
- Position: Fly-half
International career
Years	Team	Apps	(Points)
1993-1995	Ivory Coast	7	(15)

Aboubakar Camara (born 26 December 1965 in Bingerville) is a former Ivorian rugby union footballer and a current coach. He played as a fly-half.

He played for ASPAA in Ivory Coast.

Camara had 7 caps for Côte d'Ivoire, from 1993 to 1995, scoring 3 tries and 15 points in aggregate. He was selected for the first presence of his country at the 1995 Rugby World Cup finals, playing in all the three matches and scoring an historical try in the 54–18 loss to France.

Camara was also the head coach of the Central African side.
