= Swiss Rugby Federation =

Swiss sport governing body

'Fédération Suisse de Rugby'
- Sport: Rugby union
- Founded: 1972; 53 years ago
- World Rugby affiliation: 1988
- Rugby Europe affiliation: 1975
- Headquarters: 3, Pavillonweg; P.O. Box 7705; Bern; 3012 Switzerland
- President: Peter Schüpbach
- Men's coach: Patrice Philippe
- Women's coach: Frederique Meyer
- Website: www.suisserugby.com

The Swiss Rugby Federation (French: Fédération Suisse de Rugby Italian: Federazione Svizzera di Rugby German: Schweizerischer Rugby Verband)) is the national sports federation for rugby union and sevens rugby in Switzerland. Founded in 1972, the association has around 50 clubs and 180 teams. It has represented Switzerland in the World Rugby Federation since 1988 and in the continental association Rugby Europe since 1974.

It currently runs the League A, League B, League C and League 1 national championships. The leading teams compete for the Swiss Cup in the League A, that for the 2012-2013 season is organized as follows :

- Grasshoppers Club Zürich
- Hermance Région Rugby Club
- Lausanne Université Club Rugby
- Nyon Rugby Club
- Stade Lausanne Rugby Club
- Rugby Club Avusy
- Rugby Club Genève Plan-les-Ouates
- UMB Rugby Lugano

== See also ==
- Switzerland national rugby union team
- Nyon Rugby Club
- Rugby Club CERN
