= Max Brito =

Ivorian rugby union player (1971–2022)

- Born: 8 April 1968 Abidjan, Ivory Coast
- Died: 19 December 2022 (aged 54)

Rugby union career
- Position: Wing
International career
| Years | Team | Apps | (Points) |
| 1995 | Ivory Coast | 3 | (0) |

Max Brito (8 April 1968 – 19 December 2022) was an Ivorian rugby union player on the Ivory Coast rugby team. As a result of injuries sustained at the 1995 Rugby World Cup in South Africa, he was paralysed. As of 2007, he could only move his head, torso and an arm.

== Career ==
Brito played as a winger, and spent his career playing for Biscarrosse Olympique in the Fédérale 3 division of French rugby. An electrician by trade, he was noticeable on the field for his long dreadlocks as well as his brave play. Brito was called into the Ivory Coast national rugby union team for the 1995 Rugby World Cup. Brito came on as a substitute in the opening game against Scotland which the Ivory Coast lost by 89 points to nil, a result which led many to question the inclusion of "minor" teams in the tournament. He played again in the second game for Les Elephants, who put in a vastly improved performance against France, despite losing 54–18.

== Injury ==
Brito started Ivory Coast's third match against Tonga on 3 June. He caught a high ball that had been kicked up the field, and set off on a counter-attack. He was tackled by Inoke Afeaki, the Tonga flanker, before a ruck formed over him. The ruck collapsed and several players fell on top of Brito, leaving him prone and motionless on the ground. Brito was taken to the intensive care unit of the Unitas Hospital in Pretoria with broken vertebrae. Operations were carried out to stabilise the fourth and fifth vertebrae, but Brito was left paralysed below the neck.

After the accident, Brito was given treatment and compensation, which was funded by all sides competing at the 1995 Rugby World Cup. Nevertheless, in 2007, it was reported that Brito was still largely unable to move, being bedridden most of the time, with only some limited movement in his chest and arms. He and his wife separated, whilst he had little contact with his sons, and he lived with his parents in Bordeaux. There was some criticism of how his case was handled, after the initial support: Damian Hopley, Head of the Professional Rugby Players' Association, said in 2003, "We became involved in money-raising events for Max ... but there was very little support for him from Rugby World Cup."

In his 2007 interview, Brito was portrayed as living an unhappy life. He was quoted as saying:

It is now 12 years since I have been in this state. I have come to the end of my tether... If one day I fall seriously ill, and if I have the strength and courage to take my own life, then I will do it...This bloody handicap – it's my curse. It kills me and I will never accept it. I can't live with it and it's going to be with me for the rest of my life.

But in 2020, in an interview with i, he revealed he had undergone a spiritual transformation that had helped him cope with his disability.

I would say there were 13 or 14 years of fog where I didn't know where I was. The accident was very violent. But after that I had a spiritual enlightenment and I understood that it was necessary to accept my handicap. And from that moment on, all the doors were open.

=== Death ===
Brito died on 19 December 2022, at the age of 54.
