= Rugby union in Morocco =

- Country: Morocco
- Governing body: Royal Moroccan Rugby Federation
- National team: Morocco
- First played: 1900s
- Registered players: 8010
- Clubs: 20

National competitions
- Rugby World Cup; Rugby World Cup Sevens; IRB Sevens World Series (former) European Nations Cup

Rugby union in Morocco is a significant and popular sport.

== Governing body ==
The Royal Moroccan Rugby Federation was formed in 1916, joined the IRFB in 1988. Morocco is a founding member of the Confederation of African Rugby (CAR), which was launched in January 1986.

== History ==
Rugby came to Morocco in the early 20th century, mainly by the French protectorate in the country. As a result, Moroccan rugby was tied to the fortunes of France during the two world wars, with many Moroccan players going away to fight. Like many other Maghrebi nations, Moroccan rugby tended to look to Europe for inspiration, rather than to the rest of Africa.

The game became more firmly established in the 1950s, partly through the efforts of Mohammed Benjaloun, who would become president of the Moroccan Olympic Committee. For a while, Morocco originally came under European rugby auspices, but is now integrated into the African structure.

== National team ==
Morocco traditionally sees neighbours Spain as their rivals. Morocco played its first international in 1931 against them. After playing several games, they would not play another international until 1967, when they joined the European Nations Cup and FIRA. Morocco made the first division in 1983 but was beaten easily by France and Romania. After falling down the rankings, Morocco left the European series and joined the African Cup competition and won it in 2003 and 2005.

Their sevens side is regularly plays in the top circuit, doing very well in Hong Kong.

The link with France has proven to be a mixed blessing. On the one hand, several successful Moroccan players go on to play in the French leagues; on the other, some Moroccans have ended up playing for France, or refusing Moroccan caps in case they are ineligible for this. An example of this is, Abdelatif Benazzi, a forward who played for the French club of Agen and played 77 games for France.

Notable Moroccan players include:

- Abdelatif Benazzi
- Abdellatif Boutaty
- Djalil Narjissi
