= Rugby union in Seychelles =

Rugby union in Seychelles is a minor but growing sport.

== Governing body ==
The governing body is a member of the Confederation of African Rugby (CAR) but not of the International Rugby Board.

== History ==
Rugby was first introduced to the Seychelles when it was a British colony. The first games were probably played by British sailors, and for a long while, expatriates and whites dominated the game in the colony.

The national ground comprises an area flattened from a massive landslide caused by a heavy rain from a cyclone.

The Seychelles are a founder member of the Confederation of African Rugby (CAR), which was launched officially in January 1986, in Tunis, Tunisia.

=== "The Seychelles Affair" ===
In 1981, Colonel Mike Hoare, an anti-Communist warlord from the Congo, attempted to stage a coup d'état, against Communist president France-Albert René, to try and reinstate James Mancham. Hoare got together a group of white mercenaries, and dubbed them "Ye Ancient Order of Froth Blowers" (AOFB) after a posh English social club of the 1930s. The mercenaries were to be disguised as South African rugby players taking a holiday. In order for the plan to work, he disguised the mercenaries as a rugby club, and hid AK-47s in the bottom of their luggage, as he explained in his book The Seychelles Affair:

We were a Johannesburg beer-drinking club. We met formally once a week in our favourite pub in Braamfontein. We played Rugby. Once a year we organised a holiday for our members. We obtained special charter rates. Last year we went to Mauritius. In the best traditions of the original AOFB we collected toys for underprivileged kids and distributed them to orphanages... I made sure the toys were as bulky as possible and weighed little. Rugger footballs were ideal. These were packed in the special baggage above the false bottom to compensate for the weight of the weapon.

The plan was foiled when another passenger on their charter flight (uninvolved in the plot), who had boarded on a stop-over, was caught with illegally imported fruit. This meant that the Seychellois customs were going to commence checking every single bag, which was not something the mercenaries could afford. As a result, the AK-47s were removed prematurely, and an armed skirmish ensued, in which the men hijacked an Indian jumbo jet to fly to South Africa. Hoare and the other mercenaries spent several years in South African prisons for their troubles.

== See also ==
- Seychelles national rugby union team
- Africa Cup
