= 2008 in rugby union =

Here are the match results of the 2008 Rugby union season. Qualifiers for the 2011 Rugby World Cup began in the Caribbean, meanwhile the Six Nations Championship and the Tri Nations are set for another season.

== International tournaments ==
=== Worldwide ===
- Nations Cup — Winner: (South Africa) Emerging Springboks
- 2008 IRB Junior World Championship — Winner: New Zealand
- 2008 IRB Junior World Rugby Trophy — Winner: Uruguay
- 2007-08 IRB Sevens World Series — Winner: New Zealand

=== Africa ===
- 2008 Africa Cup/2011 Rugby World Cup - Africa qualification — Winner: -
- 2008 Castel Beer Trophy - Southern Development — Winner: Rwanda.
- 2008 Castel Beer Trophy - Southern Pool — Winner: Réunion
- 2008 Castel Beer Trophy - Northern Pool — Winner: Niger

=== Asia ===
- 2008 Asian Five Nations Cup — Winner: Japan
- 2008 Asian Five Nations - Division One — Winner: Singapore
- 2008 Asian Five Nations - Division Two — Winner: Thailand
- 2008 Asian Five Nations - South-East Asia — Indonesia
- 2008 Asian Five Nations - Pacific-Asia — Philippines
- 2008 Asian Five Nations - Central Asia — Iran
- 2008 Asian Five Nations - Other Regions
- 2011 Rugby World Cup - Asia qualification

=== Europe ===
- 2008 Six Nations Championship — Winner: Wales
- 2007-2008 European Nations Cup First Division — Winner: Georgia
- 2007-2008 European Nations Cup Division 2A — Winner: Germany
- 2007-2008 European Nations Cup Division 2B — Winner: Poland
- 2007-2008 European Nations Cup Division 3A — Winner: Sweden
- 2007-2008 European Nations Cup Division 3B — Winner: Lithuania
- 2007-2008 European Nations Cup Division 3C — Winner: Slovenia
- 2007-2008 European Nations Cup Division 3D — Winner: Greece
- 2011 Rugby World Cup - Europe qualification

=== North America ===
- 2008 Churchill Cup — Winner: England Saxons
- 2011 Rugby World Cup - Americas qualification

=== Oceania ===
- 2008 Tri Nations Series — Winner: New Zealand
- 2008 Pacific Nations Cup — Winner: Māori

=== South America ===
- 2007-2008 South American Rugby Championship "A"
- 2008 South American Rugby Championship "B"
- 2011 Rugby World Cup - Americas qualification

== Major domestic tournaments ==
=== Africa ===
- 2008 Super 14 — Crusaders
- 2008 Currie Cup — Sharks

=== Asia ===
- 2007-08 Top League — Suntory Sungoliath

=== Europe ===
- 2007-08 Guinness Premiership — London Wasps
  - 2007-08 National Division One — Northampton Saints
- 2007-08 Top 14 — Toulouse
  - 2007-08 Rugby Pro D2 — Toulon win the championship and automatic promotion, and Mont-de-Marsan win the promotion playoff.
- 2007–08 Celtic League — Leinster
- Super 10 — Calvisano
- 2007-08 Heineken Cup — Munster

=== North America ===
- 2008 North America 4

=== Oceania ===
- 2008 Air New Zealand Cup — Canterbury
- 2008 Super 14 — Crusaders
- 2008 Pacific Rugby Cup

=== South America ===
- 2008 Nacional de Clubes

== International results ==
- Complete list of fixtures involving national teams during 2008.
- • - International Friendly (a fixture not affiliated to any international tournament.)
- ♦ - World Cup Qualifying matches.

=== January ===
Date	Match		Venue	Result
6-Jan-2008	Hong Kong - Chinese Taipei •	Report	Hong Kong (Hong Kong)	64-17
9-Jan-2008	Hong Kong - Chinese Taipei •	Report	Hong Kong (Hong Kong)	52-27

=== February ===
Date
Match

Venue
Result
2-Feb-2008
Ireland - Italy
Report
Croke Park, Dublin (Ireland)
16-11
2-Feb-2008
England - Wales
Report
Twickenham, London (England)
19-26
2-Feb-2008
Georgia - Portugal

Report

Mikheil Meskhi Stadium, Tbilisi (Georgia)
31-3
3-Feb-2008
Scotland - France
Report
Murrayfield, Edinburgh (Scotland)
6-27
9-Feb-2008
France - Ireland
Report
Stade de France, Saint-Denis (France)
26-21
9-Feb-2008
Wales - Scotland

Report

Millennium Stadium, Cardiff (Wales)
30-15
9-Feb-2008
Georgia - Romania

Report

Mikheil Meskhi Stadium, Tbilisi (Georgia)
22-7
10-Feb-2008
Italy - England

Report

Stadio Flaminio, Rome (Italy)
19-23
16-Feb-2008
Portugal - Czech Republic

Report

Estádio Universitário, Lisbon (Portugal)
42-6
23-Feb-2008
Wales - Italy

Report

Millennium Stadium, Cardiff (Wales)
47-8
23-Feb-2008
Ireland - Scotland

Report

Croke Park, Dublin (Ireland)
34-13
23-Feb-2008
France - England

Report

Stade de France, Saint-Denis (France)
13-24
23-Feb-2008
Portugal - Georgia

Report

Estádio Universitário, Lisbon (Portugal)
6-11
23-Feb-2008
Spain - Romania

Report

Estadio Universidad Complutense, Madrid (Spain)
11-17
23-Feb-2008
Monaco - Greece •

Report

Monte Carlo (Monaco)
9-21

=== March ===
Date
Match

Venue
Result
1-Mar-2008
Russia - Portugal

Report

Krasnodar (Russia)
41-26
8-Mar-2008
Ireland - Wales

Report

Croke Park, Dublin (Ireland)
12-16
8-Mar-2008
Scotland - England

Report

Murrayfield, Edinburgh (Scotland)
15-9
8-Mar-2008
Romania - Portugal

Report

Stadionul Naţional de Rugby, Bucharest (Romania)
21-15
8-Mar-2008
Russia - Spain

Report

Krasnodar (Russia)
42-16
9-Mar-2008
France - Italy

Report

Stade de France, Saint-Denis (France)
25-13
15-Mar-2008
Italy - Scotland

Report

Stadio Flaminio, Rome (Italy)
23-20
15-Mar-2008
England - Ireland

Report

Twickenham, London (England)
33-10
15-Mar-2008
Wales - France

Report

Millennium Stadium, Cardiff (Wales)
29-12
15-Mar-2008
Russia - Romania

Report

Krasnodar (Russia)
12-8
22-Mar-2008
Romania - Czech Republic

Report

Stadionul Dinamo, Bucharest (Romania)
76-7
29-Mar-2008
Czech Republic - Georgia

Report

Prague (Czech Republic)
3-22
29-Mar-2008
(Saint Vincent and the Grenadines) St Vincent & Gren.- Mexico ♦

Report

Kingstown (Saint Vincent and the Grenadines)
7-47

=== April ===
Date
Match

Venue
Result
5-Apr-2008
Denmark - Switzerland

Report

Odense (Denmark)
13-28
5-Apr-2008
Hong Kong - Tunisia •

Report

Hong Kong (Hong Kong)
25-12
12-Apr-2008
Russia - Georgia

Report

Krasnoyarsk (Russia)
12-18
12-Apr-2008
Moldova - Belgium

Report

Chişinau (Moldova)
19-22
12-Apr-2008
Armenia - Denmark

Report

Yerevan (Armenia)
24-13
12-Apr-2008
Tunisia - Hong Kong •

Report

Tunis (Tunisia)
29-9
13-Apr-2008
Lithuania - Latvia •

Report

Klaipėda (Lithuania)
43-17
19-Apr-2008
Czech Republic - Russia

Report

Prague (Czech Republic)
3-49
19-Apr-2008
Germany - Ukraine

Report

Hanover (Germany)
13-5
19-Apr-2008
Croatia - Andorra

Report

Split (Croatia)
15-10
19-Apr-2008
Switzerland - Sweden

Report

Nyon (Switzerland)
16-28
19-Apr-2008
Luxembourg - Slovenia

Report

Luxembourg (Luxembourg)
3-10
20-Apr-2008
(Cayman Islands) Cayman - (Trinidad and Tobago) Trinidad & Tob. ♦

Report

George Town (Cayman Islands)
12-39
20-Apr-2008
Barbados - Mexico ♦

Report

George Town (Cayman Islands)
21-20
20-Apr-2008
Bahamas - Bermuda ♦

Report

George Town (Cayman Islands)
13-29
20-Apr-2008
Jamaica - Guyana ♦

Report

George Town (Cayman Islands)
3-10
20-Apr-2008
Bosnia and Herzegovina - Israel

Report

Zenica (Bosnia-Herzegovina)
27-19
22-Apr-2008
Niue - Papua New Guinea

Report

Alofi (Niue)
27-46
23-Apr-2008
Cayman Islands - Mexico

Report

George Town (Cayman Islands)
6-13
23-Apr-2008
Bahamas - Jamaica

Report

George Town (Cayman Islands)
19-12
23-Apr-2008
Bermuda - Guyana ♦

Report

George Town (Cayman Islands)
13-25
23-Apr-2008
(Trinidad and Tobago) Trinidad & Tob. - Barbados ♦

Report

George Town (Cayman Islands)
56-0
26-Apr-2008
Cayman Islands - Jamaica

Report

George Town (Cayman Islands)
11-10
26-Apr-2008
Bahamas - Mexico

Report

George Town (Cayman Islands)
23-17
26-Apr-2008
Bermuda - Barbados

Report

George Town (Cayman Islands)
17-6
26-Apr-2008
(Trinidad and Tobago) Trinidad & Tob. - Guyana ♦

Report

George Town (Cayman Islands)
40-24
26-Apr-2008
Georgia - Spain

Report

Boris Paichadze National Stadium, Tbilisi (Georgia)
22-20
26-Apr-2008
South Korea - Japan

Report

Incheon (Korea Republic)
17-39
26-Apr-2008
Arabian Gulf - Hong Kong

Report

Al Ain (United Arab Emirates)
12-20
26-Apr-2008
Poland - Latvia

Report

Koszalin (Poland)
55-0
26-Apr-2008
Sweden - Serbia

Report

Lund (Sweden)
22-3
26-Apr-2008
Austria - Norway

Report

Vienna (Austria)
3-3
26-Apr-2008
Slovenia - Israel

Report

Ljubljana (Slovenia)
17-5
26-Apr-2008
Netherlands - Germany

Report

Amsterdam (Netherlands)
17-27

=== May ===
Date
Match

Venue
Result
3-May-2008
Japan - Arabian Gulf

Report

Hanazono Stadium, Osaka (Japan)
114-6
3-May-2008
Hong Kong - Kazakhstan

Report

Hong Kong (Hong Kong)
23-17
3-May-2008
Moldova - Ukraine

Report

Chişinau (Moldova)
9-14
3-May-2008
Belgium - Netherlands

Report

Brussels (Belgium)
51-3
3-May-2008
Lithuania - Austria

Report

Vilnius (Lithuania)
48-0
3-May-2008
Israel - Luxembourg

Report

Netanya (Israel)
20-12
9-May-2008
Arabian Gulf - South Korea

Report

Doha (Qatar)
20-43
10-May-2008
Spain - Portugal

Report

Estadio Universidad Complutense, Madrid (Spain)
21-17
10-May-2008
Latvia - Croatia

Report

Riga (Latvia)
20-8
10-May-2008
Malta - Poland

Report

Paola (Malta)
16-29
10-May-2008
Armenia - Serbia

Report

Yerevan (Armenia)
25-0
10-May-2008
Norway - Bulgaria

Report

Stavanger (Norway)
44-21
10-May-2008
(Bosnia and Herzegovina) Bosnia-Herzegovina - Slovenia

Report

Zenica (Bosnia-Herzegovina)
22-17
10-May-2008
Burundi - Rwanda

Report

Bujumbura (Burundi)
5-7
10-May-2008
Kazakhstan - Japan

Report

Almaty (Kazakhstan)
6-82
11-May-2008
Cameroon - Nigeria ♦

Report

Yaoundé (Cameroon)
26-6
17-May-2008
Botswana - Eswatini ♦

Report

Gaborone (Botswana)
25-7
17-May-2008
Andorra - Malta

Report

Andorra-la-Vella (Andorra)
17-16
17-May-2008
Finland - Bosnia and Herzegovina

Report

Helsinki (Finland)
3-3
17-May-2008
Costa Rica - Cayman Islands •

Report

San José (Costa Rica)
15-20
24-May-2008
Hungary - Lithuania

Report

Esztergom (Hungary)
12-13
17-May-2008
South Korea - Kazakhstan

Report

Incheon (Korea Republic)
40-21
18-May-2008
Japan - Hong Kong

Report

Niigata (Japan)
75-29
24-May-2008
Bulgaria - Austria

Report

Sofia (Bulgaria)
16-0
24-May-2008
Finland - Luxembourg

Report

Helsinki (Finland)
11-10
24-May-2008
Kazakhstan - Arabian Gulf

Report

Almaty (Kazakhstan)
56-27
24-May-2008
Hong Kong - South Korea

Report

Hong Kong (Hong Kong)
24-50
24-May-2008
Uganda - Kenya

Report

Kampala (Uganda)
20-3
24-May-2008
Serbia - Armenia

Report

Belgrade (Serbia)
19-8
31-May-2008
Israel - Finland

Report

Netanya (Israel)
22-12
31-May-2008
Zambia - Zimbabwe •

Report

Kitwe (Zambia)
7-31
31-May-2008
Laos - Cambodia •

Report

Vientiane (Laos)
15-14

=== June ===
Date
Match

Venue
Result
7-June-2008
South Africa - Wales •

Report

Vodacom Park, Bloemfontein (South Africa)
43-17
7-June-2008
New Zealand - Ireland •

Report

Westpac Stadium, Wellington (New Zealand)
21-11
7-June-2008
Fiji - Samoa

Report

Churchill Park, Lautoka (Fiji)
34-17
7-June-2008
Norway - Lithuania

Report

Tonsberg (Norway)
9-40
7-June-2008
Argentina - Scotland •

Report

Arroyito, Rosario (Argentina)
21-15
8-June-2008
Austria - Hungary

Report

Vienna (Austria)
9-6
11-June-2008
Malaysia - Pakistan ♦

Report

Bangkok (Thailand)
30-5
11-June-2008
Thailand - India ♦

Report

Bangkok (Thailand)
30-22
11-June-2008
Romania - Uruguay

Report

Stadionul Naţional de Rugby, Bucharest (Romania)
10-6
14-June-2008
Senegal - Namibia ♦

Report

Dakar (Senegal)
10-13
14-June-2008
Zambia - Morocco ♦

Report

Lusaka (Zambia)
18-29
14-June-2008
Cameroon - Tunisia ♦

Report

Yaoundé (Cameroon)
10-16
14-June-2008
Botswana - Uganda ♦

Report

Gaborone (Botswana)
10-27
14-June-2008
India - Pakistan

Report

Bangkok (Thailand)
92-0
14-June-2008
Thailand - Malaysia ♦

Report

Bangkok (Thailand)
30-7
14-June-2008
Australia - Ireland •

Report

Telstra Dome, Melbourne (Australia)
18-12
14-June-2008
South Africa - Wales •

Report

Loftus Versfeld, Pretoria (South Africa)
37-21
14-June-2008
New Zealand - England •
Report
Eden Park, Auckland (New Zealand)
37-20
14-June-2008
Argentina - Scotland •

Report

José Amalfitani Stadium, Buenos Aires (Argentina)
14-26
15-June-2008
Japan - Tonga

Report

Sendai Yurtec Stadium, Sendai (Japan)
35-13
15-June-2008
Georgia - Uruguay

Report

Stadionul Naţional de Rugby, Bucharest (Romania)
20-18
15-June-2008
Romania - Russia

Report

Stadionul Naţional de Rugby, Bucharest (Romania)
13-12
19-June-2008
Brazil - Colombia ♦

Report

Asunción (Paraguay)
34-6
19-June-2008
Paraguay - Venezuela ♦

Report

Asunción (Paraguay)
44-3
20-June-2008
Russia - Uruguay

Report

Stadionul Naţional de Rugby, Bucharest (Romania)
19-23
21-June-2008
Venezuela - Colombia ♦

Report

Asunción (Paraguay)
32-15
21-June-2008
Paraguay - Peru ♦

Report

Asunción (Paraguay)
71-0
21-June-2008
South Africa - Italy •

Report

Newlands, Cape Town (South Africa)
26-0
21-June-2008
New Zealand - England •

Report

AMI Stadium, Christchurch (New Zealand)
44-12
21-June-2008
United States - Canada

Report

Toyota Park, Bridgeview, Illinois (United States)
10-26
22-June-2008
Japan - Fiji

Report

National Olympic Stadium, Tokyo (Japan)
12-24
23-June-2008
Brazil - Venezuela ♦

Report

Asunción (Paraguay)
56-8
23-June-2008
Colombia - Peru ♦

Report

Asunción (Paraguay)
25-20
23-June-2008
Togo - Mali

Report

Accra (Ghana)
3-0
23-June-2008
Ghana - Chad

Report

Accra (Ghana)
17-8
25-June-2008
Niger - Mali

Report

Accra (Ghana)
3-3
25-June-2008
Burkina Faso - Chad

Report

Accra (Ghana)
33-6
26-June-2008
Brazil - Peru ♦

Report

Asunción (Paraguay)
59-0
26-June-2008
Paraguay - Colombia ♦

Report

Asunción (Paraguay)
60-7
27-June-2008
Togo - Niger

Report

Accra (Ghana)
3-19
27-June-2008
Ghana - Burkina Faso

Report

Accra (Ghana)
8-9
28-June-2008
Australia - France •

Report

ANZ Stadium, Sydney (Australia)
34-13
28-June-2008
Tonga - Samoa

Report

Teufaiva Stadium, Nukuʻalofa (Tonga)
15-20
28-June-2008
Argentina - Italy •

Report

Estadio Córdoba, Córdoba (Argentina)
12-13
28-June-2008
Guam - Brunei

Report

Hagåtña (Guam)
74-0
29-June-2008
Peru - Venezuela ♦

Report

Asunción (Paraguay)
3-41
29-June-2008
Paraguay - Brazil ♦

Report

Asunción (Paraguay)
6-15

=== July ===
Date
Match

Venue
Result
1-July-2008
Réunion - Tanzania

Report

Curepipe (Mauritius)
25-16
1-July-2008
Mauritius - Mayotte

Report

Curepipe (Mauritius)
33-6
2-July-2008
Brunei - Philippines

Report

Hagåtña (Guam)
0-101
3-July-2008
Tanzania - Mayotte

Report

Curepipe (Mauritius)
32-14
3-July-2008
Mauritius - Réunion

Report

Curepipe (Mauritius)
3-10
5-July-2008
Guam - Philippines

Report

Hagåtña (Guam)
8-20
5-July-2008
Australia - France •

Report

Suncorp Stadium, Brisbane (Australia)
40-10
5-July-2008
New Zealand - South Africa

Report

Westpac Stadium, Wellington (New Zealand)
19-8
5-July-2008
Tonga - Fiji

Report

Teufaiva Stadium, Nukuʻalofa (Tonga)
27-16
5-July-2008
Samoa - Japan

Report

Apia Park, Apia (Samoa)
37-31
5-July-2008
Réunion - Mayotte

Report

Curepipe (Mauritius)
90-0
5-July-2008
Mauritius - Tanzania

Report

Curepipe (Mauritius)
22-17
12-July-2008
Ivory Coast - Zambia ♦

Report

Abidjan (Côte d'Ivoire)
32-9
12-July-2008
Kenya - Cameroon ♦

Report

Nairobi (Kenya)
76-8
12-July-2008
Madagascar - Botswana ♦

Report

Antananarivo (Madagascar)
45-15
12-July-2008
New Zealand - South Africa

Report

Carisbrook, Dunedin (New Zealand)
28-30
12-July-2008
Laos - Cambodia

Report

Jakarta (Indonesia)
33-0
15-July-2008
Indonesia - Laos

Report

Jakarta (Indonesia)
23-11
19-July-2008
Australia - South Africa

Report

Subiaco Oval, Perth (Australia)
16-9
19-July-2008
Indonesia - Cambodia

Report

Jakarta (Indonesia)
55-3
26-July-2008
Australia - New Zealand
Report
ANZ Stadium, Sydney (Australia)
34-19

=== August ===
Date
Match

Venue
Result
2-August-2008
Namibia - Zimbabwe ♦

Report

Windhoek (Namibia)
35-21
2-August-2008
Morocco - Ivory Coast ♦

Report

Casablanca (Morocco)
9-21
2-August-2008
Tunisia - Kenya ♦

Report

Tunis (Tunisia)
44-15
2-August-2008
Uganda - Madagascar ♦

Report

Kampala (Uganda)
32-22
2-August-2008
New Zealand - Australia

Report

Eden Park, Auckland (New Zealand)
39-10
9-August-2008
South Africa - Argentina

Report

Ellis Park, Johannesburg (South Africa)
63-9
16-August-2008
South Africa - New Zealand

Report

Newlands, Cape Town (South Africa)
0-19
16-August-2008
Kenya - Uganda

Report

Nairobi (Kenya)
39-20
16-August-2008
New Caledonia - Vanuatu

Report

Noumea (New Caledonia)
32-20
16-August-2008
Cook Islands - Niue

Report

National Stadium, Avarua (Cook Islands)
7-18
23-August-2008
South Africa - Australia

Report

ABSA Stadium, Durban (South Africa)
15-27
30-August-2008
New Caledonia - Niue

Report

Noumea (New Caledonia)
5-27
30-August-2008
South Africa - Australia

Report

Ellis Park, Johannesburg (South Africa)
53-8

=== September ===
Date
Match

Venue
Result
6-September-2008
Israel - Cyprus

Report

Wingate Institute, Netanya (Israel)
23-14
3-September-2008
New Zealand - Samoa

Report

Yarrow Stadium, New Plymouth (New Zealand)
101-14
13-September-2008
Serbia - Armenia ♦

Report

Smederevo (Serbia)
0-41
13-September-2008
Slovenia - Hungary ♦

Report

Ljubljana (Slovenia)
32-26
13-September-2008
Australia - New Zealand

Report

Suncorp Stadium, Brisbane (Australia)
24-28
27-September-2008
Norway - Hungary ♦

Report

Oslo (Norway)
15-26

=== October ===
Date
Match

Venue
Result
4-October-2008
Poland - Ukraine ♦

Report

Łódź (Poland)
12-13
4-October-2008
Finland - Luxembourg ♦

Report

Helsinki (Finland)
19-27
5-October-2008
Kyrgyzstan - Iran

Report

Bishkek (Kyrgyzstan)
16-30
8-October-2008
Iran - Uzbekistan

Report

Bishkek (Kyrgyzstan)
8-6
10-October-2008
Kyrgyzstan - Uzbekistan

Report

Bishkek (Kyrgyzstan)
15-15
11-October-2008
Norway - Austria ♦

Report

Oslo (Norway)
11-3
11-October-2008
Finland - Greece ♦

Report

Helsinki (Finland)
10-12
11-October-2008
Trinidad and Tobago - Brazil ♦

Report

Malabar (Trinidad and Tobago)
8-31
11-October-2008
Monaco - (Bosnia and Herzegovina) Bosnia-Herzegovina

Report

Menton (France)
5-50
18-October-2008
Brazil - Trinidad and Tobago ♦

Report

São José dos Campos (Brazil)
24-12
18-October-2008
Hungary - Denmark ♦

Report

Kecskemét (Hungary)
39-12
18-October-2008
Armenia - Switzerland ♦

Report

Abovyan (Armenia)
35-15
18-October-2008
Czech Republic - Croatia •

Report

Prague (Czech Republic)
47-0
25-October-2008
Sweden - Latvia ♦

Report

Vänersborg (Sweden)
21-5
25-October-2008
Malta - Croatia ♦

Report

Valletta (Malta)
16-18

=== November ===
Date
Match

Venue
Result
1-November-2008
Belgium - Ukraine ♦

Report

Brussels (Belgium)
9-8
1-November-2008
Netherlands - Croatia ♦

Report

Amsterdam (Netherlands)
18-12
1-November-2008
Sweden - Malta ♦

Report

Vänersborg (Sweden)
6-9
1-November-2008
Denmark - Slovenia ♦

Report

Odense (Denmark)
19-25
1-November-2008
Australia - New Zealand

Report

Hong Kong Stadium (Hong Kong)
14-19
1-November-2008
Portugal - Canada •

Report

Lisbon (Portugal)
13-21
8-November-2008
France - Argentina •

Report

Stade Vélodrome, Marseille (France)
12-6
8-November-2008
Ireland - Canada •

Report

Thomond Park, Limerick (Ireland)
55-0
8-November-2008
Italy - Australia •

Report

Stadio Euganeo, Padua (Italy)
20-30
8-November-2008
Scotland - New Zealand •

Report

Murrayfield, Edinburgh (Scotland)
6-32
8-November-2008
Wales - South Africa •

Report

Millennium Stadium, Cardiff (Wales)
15-20
8-November-2008
Russia - Spain ♦

Moscow (Russia)
42-15
8-November-2008
Andorra - Lithuania ♦

Report

Andorra la Vella (Andorra)
10-26
8-November-2008
Latvia - Netherlands ♦

Report

Jelgava (Latvia)
10-29
8-November-2008
Austria - Slovenia ♦

Report

Vienna (Austria)
9-18
8-November-2008
United States - Uruguay •

Report

Rio Tinto Stadium, Sandy, Utah (United States)
43-9
11-November-2008
Sri Lanka - Singapore

Report

Tainan (Chinese Taipei)
20-20
13-November-2008
Chinese Taipei - Singapore

Report

Tainan (Chinese Taipei)
22-23
14-November-2008
Wales - Canada •

Report

Millennium Stadium, Cardiff (Wales)
34-13
15-November-2008
Ireland - New Zealand •

Report

Croke Park, Dublin (Ireland)
3-22
15-November-2008
England - Australia •

Report

Twickenham, London (England)
14-28
15-November-2008
Scotland - South Africa •

Report

Murrayfield, Edinburgh (Scotland)
10-14
15-November-2008
Italy - Argentina •

Report

Stadio Olimpico di Torino, Turin (Italy)
14-22
15-November-2008
Spain - Germany ♦

Report

Madrid (Spain)
22-11
15-November-2008
Czech Republic - Poland ♦

Report

Ostrava (Czech Republic)
7-13
15-November-2008
Chinese Taipei - Sri Lanka

Report

Tainan (Chinese Taipei)
35-23
15-November-2008
Lithuania - Switzerland ♦

Report

Kaunas (Lithuania)
33-0
15-November-2008
Bulgaria - Israel ♦

Report

Pernik (Bulgaria)
8-11
15-November-2008
Slovakia - (Bosnia and Herzegovina) Bosnia-Herzegovina

Report

Bratislava (Slovakia)
32-46
16-November-2008
Moldova - Belgium ♦

Report

Chişinău (Moldova)
20-8
16-November-2008
Japan - United States •

Report

Mizuho Rugby Stadium, Nagoya (Japan)
29-19
22-November-2008
Wales - New Zealand •

Report

Millennium Stadium, Cardiff (Wales)
9-29
22-November-2008
France - Australia •

Report

Stade de France, Saint-Denis (France)
13-18
22-November-2008
England - South Africa •

Report

Twickenham, London (England)
6-42
22-November-2008
Scotland - Canada •

Report

Pittodrie, Aberdeen (Scotland)
41-0
22-November-2008
Ireland - Argentina •

Report

Croke Park, Dublin (Ireland)
17-3
22-November-2008
Japan - United States •

Report

Chichibunomiya Rugby Stadium, Tokyo (Japan)
32-17
22-November-2008
Czech Republic - Moldova ♦

Report

Prague (Czech Republic)
11-9
22-November-2008
Uruguay - Chile

Report

Estadio Charrúa, Montevideo (Uruguay)
46-12
22-November-2008
Greece - Israel ♦

Report

Kifissia (Greece)
10-25
22-November-2008
(Bosnia and Herzegovina) Bosnia - Azerbaijan

Report

Zenica (Bosnia-Herzegovina)
18-7
29-November-2008
England - New Zealand •

Report

Twickenham, London (England)
6-32
29-November-2008
Wales - Australia •

Report

Millennium Stadium, Cardiff (Wales)
21-18
29-November-2008
Luxembourg - Bulgaria ♦

Report

Luxembourg (Luxembourg)
10-18
29-November-2008
Azerbaijan - Cyprus

Report

Baku (Azerbaijan)
3-37

=== December ===
Date
Match

Venue
Result
6-December-2008
Serbia - Andorra ♦

Report

Smederevo (Serbia)
32-7
6-December-2008
Cyprus - Monaco ♦

Report

Episkopi (Cyprus)
24-3

== Other Test Match results ==
=== All months ===
Date
Match

Venue
Result
27-May-2008
Barbarians - Ireland •

Report

Kingsholm, Gloucester (England)
14-39
1-June-2008
England - Barbarians •

Report

Twickenham, London (England)
17-14
8-November-2008
England - Pacific Islanders •

Report

Twickenham, London (England)
39-13
15-November-2008
France - Pacific Islanders •

Report

Stade Auguste Bonal, Montbéliard (France)
42-17
22-November-2008
Italy - Pacific Islanders •

Report

Stadio Giglio, Reggio Emilia (Italy)
17-25
3-December-2008
Barbarians - Australia •

Report

Wembley Stadium, London (England)
11-18

== See also ==
- 2008 in sports
- Rugby union in 2009
