= Rugby union in Algeria =

- Country: Algeria
- Governing body: Algerian Rugby Federation
- National team: Algeria
- Registered players: 7,000
- Clubs: 35

National competitions
- Rugby union Champ.; Rugby union W-Champ.; Rugby sevens Champ.; Rugby sevens W-Champ.

International competitions
- Rugby Africa Cup; North African Tri Nations; Crescent Cup; Rugby Africa Women's Cup; Africa Men's Sevens; Africa Women's Sevens

Rugby union in Algeria is a moderately popular sport. After many years of work, in 2015, Algeria finally created a federation enabling them to apply for member status of Rugby Africa (the administrative body for rugby union within Africa). Algeria has experienced success at the international level causing an increase in overall popularity.

== History ==
Rugby union was introduced into Algeria by the French. Some Pied-Noirs (ethnic European Algerians) would go on to become significant rugby players, such as Maurice Boyau.

As with many minor rugby nations, rugby is centered on Oran, Guelma, Algiers, Annaba.

Like many North African countries, the historical connection with France is a mixed blessing. For a number of years, Algerian rugby players would leave to play there, which deprived Algerian rugby of any real competition. There are at least sixty Algerians playing in English and French rugby. Like many other Maghrebi nations, Algerian rugby tended to look to Europe for inspiration, rather than to the rest of Africa.

However, one exception might be Boumedienne Allam: Allam first played for France U-21 squad, winning the Six Nations Tournament of that category, in 2000. He was a member of the historical first game of Algeria national rugby union team, on 24 February 2007.

After independence, the first club created was Stade Oranais in Oran in 2007. Algerian federation was created in 2015 and the first championship started in 2018.

== Clubs ==
Algeria has six rugby union clubs to date, and there are plans to set up a proper national club competition. They are currently trying to promote the game in universities and schools.

- Stade Oranais (Oran)
- Rugby Club d'Alger (Algiers)
- Mouloudia M'sila (M'sila)
- Rugby Club de Béjaïa (Béjaïa)
- Rugby Turck (Aïn El Turk – Oran)
- Étoile de Biskra (Biskra)

For the 2017–18 season, these were the top teams:

Locations of the 2017–18 Top 20 teams

== National teams ==
=== Men's teams ===
- Algeria national rugby union team

The national rugby union team played its first unofficial game on 24 February 2007 under its first coach Morad Kellal. Almost all players play at French clubs, however there are some national players who practice the sport in Australia, New Zealand, Romania and England.

On 18 December 2015, the national team played its first official game since the creation of the Algerian rugby federation (FAR) against the Tunisian rugby union team, to which they won 16 – 6. This was also the first international match played on Algerian soil (Oran), which was televised on the Algerian channel Canal Algérie in the country for the first time.

Ahmed Zabana Stadium which is situated in Oran is the official venue of Algeria national team.

- Algeria national sevens union team

=== Women's teams ===
- Algeria women's national rugby union team
- Algeria women's national rugby sevens team

== Competitions ==
=== Men's competitions ===
- Algerian rugby union Championship
- Algerian rugby sevens Championship

=== Women's competitions ===
- Algerian women's rugby union Championship
- Algerian women's rugby sevens Championship

=== Youth competitions ===
Competitions for men's and women's rugby union for U-10, U-12, U-14, U-16, U-18 and U-20.
