= 2010 CAR Development Trophy =

The 2010 CAR Development Trophy, also known as the 2010 African Development Trophy, was the seventh edition of third (former second) level rugby union tournament in Africa. The competition involved ten teams that are divided into two zones North, central and south. This was the final year of the trophy.

Two tournaments were held in northern and southern zones. The northern tournament was held in Cairo, Egypt. Algeria defeated Egypt with a score of 50-0 in the final. The southern tournament was held in an away/home legs. Rwanda defeated Burundi in both games.

== North Tournament ==
2010 African Development Trophy North Section
Tournament details
- Host: Egypt
- Date: 26–30 October
- Teams: 4

Final positions
- Champions: Algeria
- Runner-up: Egypt

Tournament statistics
- Matches played: 4

=== Semifinals ===
26 October 2010

Algeria	50 – 0	Libya

American University of Cairo Stadium, Cairo

26 October 2010

Egypt	10 – 5	Mauritania

American University of Cairo Stadium, Cairo

=== Third place match ===
29 October 2010

Libya	5 – 10	Mauritania

American University of Cairo Stadium, Cairo

=== Final ===
29 October 2010

Algeria	50 – 0	Egypt

American University of Cairo Stadium, Cairo

== South Tournament ==
2009 CAR Development Trophy Center Section
Tournament details
- Date: 12–20 December 2009
- Teams: 2

Final positions
- Champions: Rwanda
- Runner-up: Burundi

Tournament statistics
- Matches played: 2

Place	Nation	Games				Points		Bonus	Table points
Place	Nation	played	won	drawn	lost	for	against	Bonus	Table points
1	Rwanda	2	2	0	0	28	6	0	8
2	Burundi	2	0	0	2	6	28	1	1

12 December 2009

Rwanda	12 - 6	Burundi

Kigali

20 December 2009

Burundi	0 - 16	Rwanda

Bujumbura

== See also ==
- 2010 Africa Cup
- 2010 Africa Trophy
