= 2010 Africa Trophy =

The 2010 Africa Trophy, was the seventh edition of second level rugby union tournament in Africa and the second one under this name. The competition are divided into three zones (North, center and South).

== North Zone ==
2010 Africa Trophy North
Tournament details
- Host: Niger
- Date: 17–24 July

Final positions
- Champions: Senegal
- Runner-up: Niger

Tournament statistics
- Matches played: 8

The tournament was played in Niamey, Niger.

=== First round ===
17 July 2010

Niger	23 – 6	DR Congo

Niamey

17 July 2010

Mali	20 – 3	Burkina Faso

Niamey

18 July 2010

Ghana	31 – 0	Benin

Niamey

18 July 2010

Senegal	65 – 0	Togo

Niamey

=== 5–8 Classification ===
20 July 2010

Burkina Faso	21 – 0	DR Congo

Niamey

20 July 2010

Togo	12 – 5	Benin

Niamey

=== Semifinals ===
21 July 2010

Niger	6 – 3	Mali

Niamey

21 July 2010

Senegal	30 – 0	Ghana

Niamey

=== Finals ===
24 July 2010

Senegal	13 – 6	Niger

Niamey

=== Playoff 3rd–4th ===
24 July 2010

Mali	17 – 8	Ghana

Niamey

=== Playoff 5th–6th ===
24 July 2010

Burkina Faso	17 – 0	Togo

Niamey

=== Playoff 7th–8th ===
24 July 2010

DR Congo	53 – 17	Benin

Niamey

== Center Zone ==
2010 Africa Trophy Center
Tournament details
- Host: Rwanda
- Date: 24–26 November

Final positions
- Champions: Rwanda
- Runner-up: Burundi

Tournament statistics
- Matches played: 2

The tournament was played in Kigali, Rwanda.

24 November 2010

Rwanda	39 – 13	Burundi

Niamey

26 November 2010

Rwanda	19 – 6	Burundi

Niamey

== South Zone ==
2010 Africa Trophy South
Tournament details
- Host: Tanzania
- Date: 16–19 June

Final positions
- Champions: Kenya
- Runner-up: Uganda

Tournament statistics
- Matches played: 4

The tournament was played in Arusha, Tanzania.

=== Semifinals ===
16 June 2010

Kenya	27 – 3	Mauritius

Arusha

16 June 2010

Uganda	39 – 3	Tanzania

Arusha

=== Third place match ===
19 June 2010

Mauritius	21 – 13	Tanzania

Arusha

=== Final ===
19 June 2010

Kenya	27 – 13	Uganda

Arusha

== See also ==
- 2010 Africa Cup
- 2010 CAR Development Trophy
