= 2008 CAR Development Trophy =

The 2008 CAR Development Trophy, also known as the CAR Super 16, was the fifth edition of second level rugby union tournament in Africa. The competition involved thirteen teams that are divided into three zones (North, center and South). In the north there were two pools of three teams. In the 2008 edition Botswana, Swaziland and Nigeria did not participate, due to involvement in the World Cup qualifiers.

In the North Niger defeated Burkina Faso 16-3 in the final. In the South, Réunion won. And Rwanda won against Burundi with a score of 7-5.

== Southern Tournament ==
2008 CAR Development Trophy South Section
Tournament details
- Date: 6 May– 6 July 2008
- Teams: 7

Final positions
- Champions: Réunion
- Runner-up: Mauritius

Tournament statistics
- Matches played: 9

- Was hosted by Mauritius.
- Was held from 30 June through to 6 July when the final took place.

| Team | P | W | D | Lost | For | Ag. | Bonus | Points | Notes |
|---|---|---|---|---|---|---|---|---|---|
| Réunion | 3 | 3 | 0 | 0 | 125 | 19 | 1 | 13 | to 2009 Africa Trophy |
| Mauritius | 3 | 2 | 0 | 1 | 58 | 33 | 2 | 10 | to 2009 Africa Trophy |
| Tanzania | 3 | 2 | 0 | 1 | 65 | 61 | 2 | 6 | |
| Mayotte | 3 | 0 | 0 | 3 | 20 | 155 | 0 | 0 | |

2008-07-01

| Réunion | 25–16 | Tanzania |

New Georges V Stadium, Curepipe

2008-07-01

| Mauritius | 33–6 | Mayotte |

New Georges V Stadium, Curepipe

2008-07-03

| Tanzania | 32–14 | Mayotte |

New Georges V Stadium, Curepipe

2008-07-03

| Mauritius | 3–10 | Réunion |

New Georges V Stadium, Curepipe

2008-07-05

| Réunion | 90–0 | Mayotte |

New Georges V Stadium, Curepipe

2008-07-05

| Mauritius | 22–17 | Tanzania |

New Georges V Stadium, Curepipe

== Center Tournament ==
2008 CAR Development Trophy Center Section
Tournament details
- Date: 6 May– 10 July 2008
- Teams: 2

Final positions
- Champions: Rwanda
- Runner-up: Burundi

Tournament statistics
- Matches played: 2

The tournament was played in Bujumbura, Burundi.

| Place | Nation | Games | | | | Points | | Bonus | Table points |
| Place | Nation | played | won | drawn | lost | for | against | Bonus | Table points |
|---|---|---|---|---|---|---|---|---|---|
| 1 | Rwanda | 2 | 2 | 0 | 0 | 76 | 30 | 2 | 10 |
| 2 | Burundi | 2 | 1 | 0 | 1 | 61 | 31 | 2 | 6 |
| 3 | (Belgium) Kibubu | 2 | 0 | 0 | 2 | 49 | 125 | 0 | 0 |

2008-05-06

| Burundi | 56–24 | (Belgium) Kibubu |

Bujumbura

2008-05-08

| Rwanda | 69–25 | (Belgium) Kibubu |

Bujumbura

2008-05-10

| Burundi | 5–7 | Rwanda |

Bujumbura

- DR Congo were replaced by Belgian club side Kibubu after they pulled out for financial reasons.

== Northern Tournament ==
The tournament was hosted in Accra, Ghana.

2008 CAR Development Trophy South Section
Tournament details
- Host: Ghana
- Date: 23–29 June 2008
- Teams: 6

Final positions
- Champions: Réunion
- Runner-up: Mauritius

Tournament statistics
- Matches played: 9

Pool A

| Place | Nation | Games | | | | Points | | Bonus | Table points |
| Place | Nation | played | won | drawn | lost | for | against | Bonus | Table points |
|---|---|---|---|---|---|---|---|---|---|
| 1 | Niger | 2 | 1 | 1 | 0 | 22 | 6 | 1 | 7 |
| 2 | Togo | 2 | 1 | 0 | 1 | 6 | 19 | 0 | 4 |
| 3 | Mali | 2 | 0 | 1 | 1 | 3 | 6 | 1 | 3 |

23 June 2008

| Togo | 3–0 | Mali |

Accra

25 June 2008

| Niger | 3–3 | Mali |

Accra

27 June 2008

| Togo | 3–19 | Niger |

Accra

Pool B

| Place | Nation | Games | | | | Points | | Bonus | Table points |
| Place | Nation | played | won | drawn | lost | for | against | Bonus | Table points |
|---|---|---|---|---|---|---|---|---|---|
| 1 | Burkina Faso | 2 | 2 | 0 | 0 | 42 | 14 | 1 | 9 |
| 2 | Ghana | 2 | 1 | 0 | 1 | 25 | 17 | 1 | 5 |
| 3 | Chad | 2 | 0 | 0 | 2 | 14 | 50 | 0 | 0 |

23 June 2008

| Ghana | 17–8 | Chad |

Accra

25 June 2008

| Burkina Faso | 33–6 | Chad |

Accra

27 June 2008

| Ghana | 8–9 | Burkina Faso |

Accra

5th versus 6th Playoff

29 June 2008

| Chad | 10–0 | Mali |

Accra

3rd versus 4th Playoff

29 June 2008

| Ghana | 27–6 | Togo |

Accra

Final

29 June 2008

| Burkina Faso | 3–16 | Niger |

Accra

== See also ==
- Africa Cup
