= Sofiane Chellat =

Algeria international rugby union player

- Born: Sofiane Chellat; 12 January 1990 (age 36) Soissons, France
- Height: 1.74 m (5 ft 9 in)
- Weight: 108 kg (17 st 0 lb)

Rugby union career
- Position: Prop
Senior career
Years	Team	Apps	(Points)
2013-2014	Stade Rodez	15	(0)
2014-2015	Stade Français	11	(0)
2015-2016	US Montauban	8	(0)
2016-	RC Massy	17	(0)
- Correct as of 20 October 2018
International career
Years	Team	Apps	(Points)
2014–present	Algeria	7	(0)

Sofiane Chellat (born 12 January 1990) is a French Algerian Rugby union player. His regular playing position is as Prop for Stade Français in the Top 14.

== Playing career ==
Sofiane Chellat started as a pillar in the club AC Soissons, then joined the training center of Racing 92. During the 2013–2014 season, he goes to the Stade Rodez Aveyron in Fédérale 1. He is committed to 2014 at Stade Français, where he makes his professional debut in Top 14 and European Cup. After a season spent in the Ile-de-France club, he went to the US Montauban, which is playing in Pro D2 for the 2015–16 season. He makes his first appearance in Pro D2 in the club against Biarritz Olympique August 28, 2015.

== Algeria ==
He honored his first international cape in Algeria on March 1, 2014, against the Ivory Coast team at Ernest Dufer Stadium (Toulouse). Then he participated in 2015 in the Crescent Cup organised by World Rugby and the Islamic Solidarity Sports Federation and in their first official match against Kazakhstan after this session Chellat did not return to the Algeria national team again. until 2018 in the Rugby Africa Silver Cup where he participated in three games and contributed to the rise of the Algerian team to the Rugby Africa Gold Cup for the first time with the major continent such as Kenya and Namibia.

=== International matches ===
Opponent	Location	Venue	Competition	Date	Result
Kazakhstan	Merlimau, Malaysia	Merlimau Polytechnic Batang	Crescent Cup	6 June 2015	Won
Kazakhstan	Merlimau, Malaysia	Merlimau Polytechnic Batang	Crescent Cup	10 June 2015	Won
Malaysia	Merlimau, Malaysia	Merlimau Polytechnic Batang	Crescent Cup	14 June 2015	Lost
Senegal	Toulouse, France	Stade Alain Coulon	Rugby Africa Silver Cup	8 July 2018	Won
Ivory Coast	Toulouse, France	Stade Alain Coulon	Rugby Africa Silver Cup	14 July 2018	Won
Zambia	Mufulira, Zambia	Leopards Rugby Club Stadium	Rugby Africa Silver Cup	20 October 2018	Won

== Rugby statistics ==
As of 22 October 2018

Season	Team	Games	Starts	Sub	Mins	Tries	Cons	Pens	Drops	Points	Yel	Red
2013–14	Stade Rodez	15	10	5	751	0	0	0	0	0	1	1
2012–15	Stade Français	6	0	6	122	0	0	0	0	0	0	0
2015–16	US Montauban	8	1	7	205	0	0	0	0	0	1	0
2016–17	RC Massy	10	7	3	426	0	0	0	0	0	1	1
2017–18	RC Massy	7	2	5	198	0	0	0	0	0	0	0
2018–19	RC Massy	1	1	0	80	0	0	0	0	0	1	0
Total		47	21	26	1782	0	0	0	0	0	4	2

== Honours ==
- French Top 14
  - Champions Stade Français: 2014–15
