= Rugby union in the Congo =

Rugby union in the Congo can refer to either:

- Rugby union in the Democratic Republic of the Congo
- Rugby union in the Republic of the Congo
