= Mayotte Rugby Committee =

Comité Territorial de Rugby de Mayotte
- Sport: Rugby union
- Founded: 1991
- Website: rugbymayotte.fr

The Mayotte Rugby Committee (French: Comité de Rugby de Mayotte, —or officially: Comité Territorial de Rugby de Mayotte) is a committee under the umbrella of the French Rugby Federation which is the governing body for rugby union within Mayotte.

The organisation was previously Ligue Régionale de Rugby de Mayotte, but was upgraded to committee status in 2008. It is affiliated with the Confederation of African Rugby (CAR), which is the regional governing body for rugby union in Africa, but it is not affiliated with the World Rugby in its own right.

== National teams ==
As an overseas department of France, Mayotte can participate in international competition, but not for the Rugby World Cup. Mayotte has thus far competed in the south section of the CAR Development Trophy along with African nations.

== See also ==
- Rugby union in Mayotte
- Mayotte national rugby union team
