= Rugby union in Mauritius =

Rugby union in Mauritius is a minor but growing sport

Rugby in Mauritius has frequently been haphazard, for example, Blantyre RFC of Malawi once undertook a tour to Mauritius. Writing back to approve the tour, the Mauritian secretary added, "Please bring your own ball. We have lost ours."

== Governing body ==
The governing body is Rugby Union Mauritius

Rugby Union Mauritius consists of approximately 600 licensees including players and officials.

== History ==
Mauritius is a former British colony, and it was introduced there by the British military in the early twentieth century. In a parallel development, a number of wealthier young Mauritians went to British and South African boarding schools during this period, and also picked up the sport there.

In 1928, a group of Franco-Mauritian players set up the first club, the Dodo Club. The game expanded between then and 1975, with more clubs being created. However, the independence of Mauritius in 1968 led to financial difficulties for Mauritian rugby, and it was left to a development programme in the 1990s to revive the game properly.

From 1928 to 1975, rugby was played at senior level between various clubs remembered as the Buffalos, HMS Mauritius, Blue Ducks, Dodo, the Navy, SMF and the Stags.

The 1995 Rugby World Cup in South Africa was broadcast on Mauritian television, and received a good deal of attention.

The Mauritius Sevens team participates in Indian Ocean tournaments with Réunion and Madagascar.

Success in sevens led to the improvement of the fifteen a side game, and Mauritius played their first international against Tanzania in 2005, winning 20–10. They also won subsequent matches against Rwanda, Burundi and Burkina Faso. Their fantastic start to international rugby has caused tremendous growth of the sport in Mauritius, with thousands of people flocking to see them play. They participate in the south section of the CAR Castel Beer Trophy, which they surprisingly won in 2005. However, in both the 2006 and 2007 editions, the side's hopes were dashed in the group stage by Botswana, who went on to win in 2007.

The Franco-Mauritian ethnic minority group tends to dominate the game, as rugby is a much less popular sport amongst the Indo-Mauritian majority. This has led to some complaints of exclusivism:

"For example, the community maintains several white-only sport and social clubs, like the Dodo Club. The national rugby team is virtually all-white, as the only islanders playing the sport are members of Franco-Mauritian clubs."

Rugby went through a period of decline until in 1998, when the Stags Club was re-created and thus triggered the thought that rugby once again had a place in Mauritian society.
