= Congo national rugby union team =

The Congo national rugby union team represents the Republic of the Congo at rugby union.

They have not qualified for the Rugby World Cup.

They competed in the 2008 Castel Beer Trophy (played from 4 May to 8 May), which was hosted in Burundi, and they made their test debut in this tournament.. In 2010, the team debuted in the CAR Trophy, losing to Niger, at Niamey, by 23-6.

== Record ==
Below is a table of the representative rugby matches played by a Congo national XV at test level up until 15 December 2013, updated after match with DR Congo.

Opponent	Played	Won	Lost	Drawn	% Won
Benin	1	1	0	0	100%~
Burkina Faso	1	0	1	0	0%
DR Congo	3	0	3	0	0%
Niger	1	0	1	0	0%
Total	6	1	5	0	16.67%

== See also ==
- Rugby union in the Republic of the Congo
