= Rugby union in Mauritania =

Rugby union in Mauritania is a minor but growing sport.

== Governing body ==
The governing body is the Mauritanian Rugby Federation (FMR), known in French as Federation Mauritanienne de Rugby. Mauritania takes part in African competitions. However, the lack of infrastructure and finances has been a hindrance in the game's development.

== Clubs ==
There are currently four member clubs of the Mauritanian Rugby Federation but only one is active.

=== Les Fennecs d’Amoukrouz ===
Les Fennecs d'Amokrouz is the only active club, it is based in Nouakchott, on ground next to the Stade Olympique (across from the Palais des Congrès), it has around 70 players from the juniors to seniors. The club operates thanks to the membership dues, the support of local companies and due to the famous fund raising "rugby party" which has become something of an institution of Noukchottoise nights.

=== Dormant clubs ===
Les Crocodiles de Rosso, Les Orques de Nouadhibou and Les Phacochères de Nouakchott are currently dormant and are subject to intermittent efforts to activate them by the FMR but the federation does not yet have the resources to do so.

== Women ==
A female team was created in Nouakchott to try to qualify for the Rugby sevens at the Summer Olympics in Rio de Janeiro in 2016.

== National side ==
The Mauritanian national side is known as Les Oryx but as Mauretania is not a member of the International Rugby Board they did not compete in the 2015 Rugby World Cup. They have played international matches against Benin, Burkina Faso, Cameroon, Egypt, Ghana, Libya, Mali, Senegal and Togo. Their only victory was a 10-5 winning margin over Libya on 30 October 2010.

== See also ==
- Mauritania national rugby union team
- Confederation of African Rugby
- Africa Cup
