= Algeria national rugby union team =

Algeria
- Nickname: Les Lionceaux (The Lion Cubs)
- Emblem: Two Lions
- Union: Algerian Rugby Federation
- Head coach: Ousmane Mané
- Captain: Rabah Abdelkader
- Most caps: Rabah Abdelkader (13)
- Top scorer: Johan Bensalla (59)
- Top try scorer: Rémi Cardon (4)
- Home stadium: Ahmed Zabana Stadium
First colours

World Rugby ranking
- Current: 43 (as of 21 July 2025)
- Highest: 43 (2025)
- Lowest: 92 (2021)

First international
- Unofficial; Tunisia 7–8 Algeria (Nabeul, Tunisia; 24 February 2007); Official; Kazakhstan 5–26 Algeria (Merlimau, Malaysia; 6 June 2015)

Biggest win
- Unofficial; Algeria 50–0 Libya (Cairo, Egypt; 26 October 2010); Egypt 0–50 Algeria (Cairo, Egypt; 29 October 2010); Official; Zambia 0–31 Algeria (Mufulira, Zambia; 20 October 2018)

Biggest defeat
- Official Zimbabwe 29-3 Algeria (Kampala, Uganda; 29 July 2024)

The Algeria national rugby union team represents the Algerian Rugby Federation (FAR) in men's international rugby union. The first match they competed in was on 24 February 2007, in a game in Tunis against the Tunisia national rugby union team (to which Algeria won by 8–7). While almost all current national team players play for clubs in the French championship, there are some national players who practice the sport in Australia, New Zealand, Romania and England. The first coach of the Algeria national rugby union team was Morad Kellal.

== History ==
=== Before 2015 ===
Rugby was played on Algerian territory during French colonization. After this period, its practice decreased rapidly, until disappearing in 1972. At the invitation of the Tunisia national rugby union team, Algeria played their first international match on 27 February 2007 against Tunisia, a match Algeria won 8 to 7.

In 2010, the Algerian rugby team participated in its first official tournament organized by the Confederation of African Rugby, the 2010 CAR Development Trophy which took place in Cairo, Egypt. Algeria emerged victorious from the tournament and won its first trophy by beating Egypt team in the final.

=== 2015: return of rugby union in Algeria ===
==== Crescent Cup Rugby Championship ====
On 1 June 2015, the Algerian Rugby Union team flew to Malaysia for the Crescent Cup Rugby Championship, their first official international competition. The Algerian rugby union team started its tournament with a 26–5 victory against the Kazakhstan team, ranked Algeria reached the final of the competition against Malaysian team, but the match was stopped due to riots between the players.

==== Creation of the national federation ====
Former logo of the NT

On 17 November 2015, the federation was formally established in Algiers at a general assembly meeting chaired by Mustapha Larfaoui, Honorary President of the Algerian Olympic Committee Olympic and Sports Algerian and in the presence of 18 clubs representing 16 wilayas. Sofiane Benhassen is elected the first president of the Algerian rugby union (FAR). Membership in the continental federation Rugby Africa is planned in December 2016.

The first official match played under the auspices of the Algerian federation on 18 December 2015 Oran against the Tunisia. Salim and Djemaï Tebani are breeders of this first official meeting on Algerian soil. In Ahmed Zabana Stadium of Oran, Algeria won this game 16–6 with a team consisting mainly of players based in France and two players trained in Algerian clubs.

==== Launch of the Maghreb Tri-Nations ====
In December 2016, the Algerian Rugby Federation in collaboration with Rugby Africa will organize the first edition of a Maghreb Tri-nations grouping Algeria, Tunisia national rugby union team and the Morocco national rugby union team. World Rugby has validated it, and the event will take place at Oran, Algeria.

==== Africa Cup ====
The Algerian team, in their first participation in the tournament, signed in the North Group with Cameroon and Nigeria, but the Cameroonian team had been postponed through lack of organization that Rugby Africa disqualified Cameroon and suspended the activity of the country's federation for three months. which made the organizing committee to play a home-and-home series matches against Nigeria in Zambia, but the latter also withdrew to be a final Winner North vs Winner South against Zambia 4 November 2017 at Mufulira Leopards Rugby Club. in a historic match as the first official match to enable the Algerian team to win a 30–25 in the first defeat to Zambia in its home since 2002. the Algerian national team will play next season in the Rugby Africa Silver Cup.

== Home grounds ==
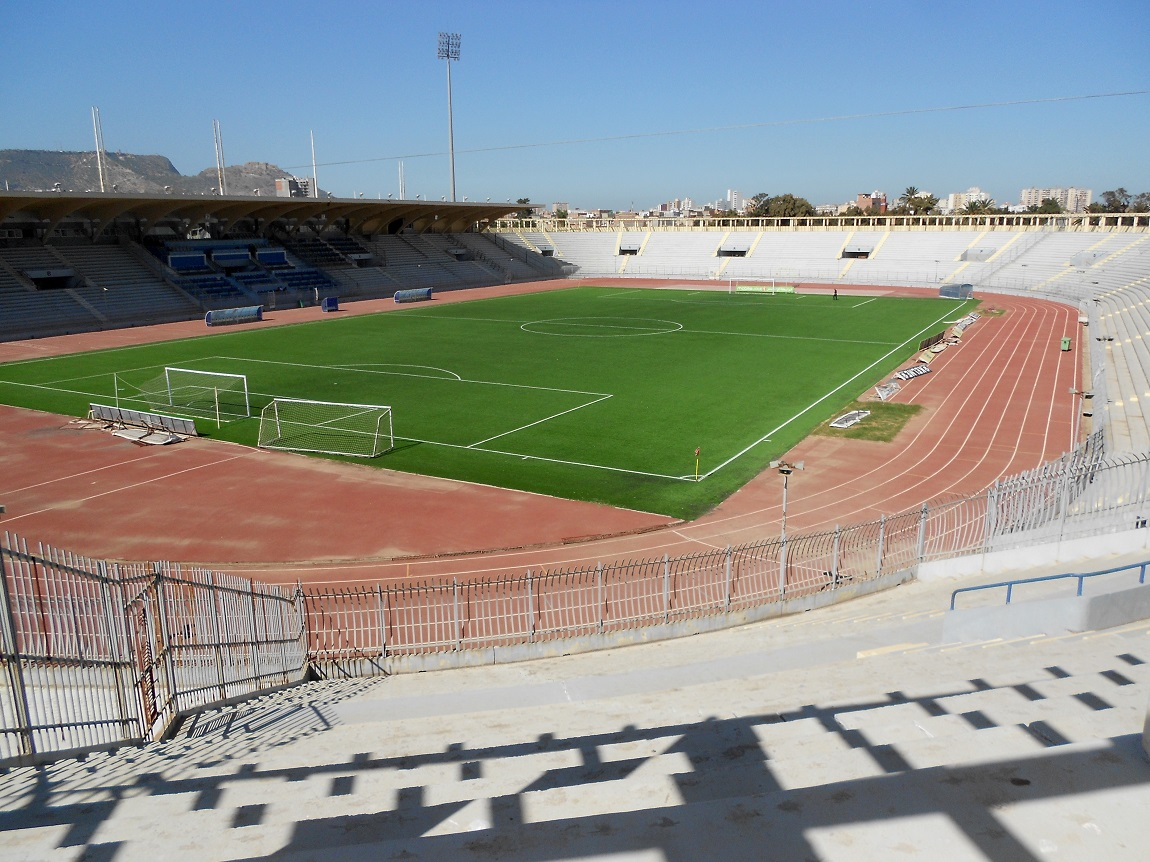
Ahmed Zabana Stadium in Oran, the home ground rugby and football (soccer) teams.

Algeria play internationals since it first receives match on 2015 at Ahmed Zabana Stadium in Oran.

== Record ==
=== Tournaments ===
==== Rugby World Cup ====
World Cup record								World Cup Qualification record					
Year	Round	P	W	D	L	F	A	P	W	D	L	F	A
(Australia) (New Zealand) 1987	Not invited							–					
(England) (France) (Ireland) (Scotland) (Wales) 1991	Did not enter							Did not enter					
(South Africa) 1995	Did not enter							Did not enter					
(Wales) 1999	Did not enter							Did not enter					
(Australia) 2003	Did not enter							Did not enter					
(France) 2007	Did not enter							Did not enter					
(New Zealand) 2011	Did not enter							Did not enter					
(England) 2015	Did not enter							Did not enter					
(Japan) 2019	Did not enter							Did not enter					
(France) 2023	Did not qualify							5	3	0	2	130	98
(Australia) 2027	Did not qualify							3	2	0	1	63	32
Total	0/11	0	0	0	0	0	0	8	5	0	3	193	130

==== Rugby Africa Cup ====
Rugby Africa Cup record
Year	Round	P	W	D	L	F	A
2000 to 2016	Did not enter						
(Zambia) 2017	Champions Bronze Cup	1	1	0	0	30	25
(Zambia) 2018	Champions Silver Cup	3	3	0	0	76	31
2019–20	Canceled due to the COVID-19 pandemic in Africa						
(France) 2021–22	Third place	5	3	0	2	130	98
(Uganda) 2024	Runners-up	3	2	1	0	55	53
(Uganda) 2025	Third place	3	2	0	1	63	32
Total	5/20	15	11	0	4	354	239

==== African Development Trophy ====
African Development Trophy record
Year	Round	P	W	D	L	F	A
2004 to 2009	Did not enter						
(Egypt) 2010	Champions North Section	2	2	0	0	100	0
Total	1/7	2	2	0	0	100	0

==== North African Tri Nations ====
North African Tri Nations record
Year	Round	P	W	D	L	F	A
(Algeria) 2016	Third place	2	0	0	2	26	28
(Morocco) 2017	Second place	2	1	0	1	49	33
(Tunisia) 2018	Canceled						
Total	2/2	4	1	0	3	75	61

==== Crescent Cup ====
Crescent Cup record
Year	Round	P	W	D	L	F	A
(Malaysia) 2015	Second place	3	2	0	1	52	24
Total	1/1	3	2	0	1	52	24

=== Overall ===
Below is a table of the representative rugby matches played by an Algeria national XV at test level up until 19 July 2025, updated after match with Kenya.

Opponent	Played	Won	Lost	Drawn	Win %	For	Aga	Diff
Egypt	1	1	0	0	100%	50	0	+50
Ghana	1	0	1	0	0%	20	22	−2
Ivory Coast	4	4	0	0	100%	121	49	+72
Kazakhstan	2	2	0	0	100%	41	5	+36
Kenya	3	2	1	0	66.67%	68	53	+15
Libya	1	1	0	0	100%	50	0	+50
Malaysia	1	0	1	0	0%	11	19	−8
Morocco	2	0	2	0	0%	24	30	−6
Namibia	1	0	1	0	0%	7	21	-14
Senegal	3	3	0	0	100%	83	42	+41
Tunisia	4	2	2	0	50%	80	62	+18
Uganda	1	1	0	0	100%	22	16	+6
Zambia	2	2	0	0	100%	61	25	+36
Zimbabwe	2	1	2	0	50%	23	41	-18
Total	27	18	9	0	66.67%	617	350	+267

== Current squad ==
The following 45 players were called up for the 2021–22 Rugby Africa Cup matches against Ghana and Uganda.

Head coach: (Algeria) Boumedienne Allam

- Caps Updated: 30 July 2021

Note: Flags indicate national union for the club/province as defined by World Rugby.

Player	Position	Date of birth (age)	Caps	Club/province
Issam Hamel	Hooker	18 June 1997 (age 29)	3	(France) USO Nevers
Adam Mokhtari	Hooker	11 December 1995 (age 30)	2	(France) Drancy
Youssef Saaidia	Hooker	9 February 1995 (age 31)	0	(France) Colomiers
Fayçal Tourek	Hooker	24 October 1988 (age 37)	3	(France) Foyer Laïque du Haut Vernet
Bekada Belhaouari	Prop	19 August 1991 (age 34)	8	(France) Lannemezan
Reda Benlebbad	Prop	18 July 1992 (age 34)	5	(France) Appaméen
Yasin Boutemmani	Prop	12 July 1990 (age 36)	0	(France) Montauban
Sofiane Chellat	Prop	12 January 1990 (age 36)	9	Monaco
Malik Hamadache	Prop	17 October 1988 (age 37)	3	(France) Montpellier
Yanis Hebal	Prop	23 February 2001 (age 25)	1	(France) Bourg-en-Bresse Espoirs
Thomas Mamou	Prop	2 December 1994 (age 31)	5	(France) Oloron
Mehdi Mérabet	Prop	21 June 1985 (age 41)	6	(France) La Seyne
Bilal Abed	Lock	30 July 1989 (age 36)	8	(France) Avenir Castanéen
Johan Aliouat	Lock	22 January 1993 (age 33)	0	(France) Biarritz
Jonathan Best	Lock	2 August 1983 (age 42)	7	(France) Béziers
Yakine Djebarri	Lock	16 December 1995 (age 30)	8	(France) Suresnes
Samir Doukbi	Lock	10 November 1985 (age 40)	4	(France) La Seyne
David Medjebeur	Lock	22 January 1996 (age 30)	4	(Scotland) Boroughmuir
Enzo Zaitri	Lock	10 June 2001 (age 25)	2	(France) Colomiers Espoirs
Rabah Abdelkader (c)	Back row	21 June 1987 (age 39)	13	(France) Millau
Walid Batchali	Back row	9 January 1990 (age 36)	5	(France) Castelnaudary
Kamil Bouregba	Back row	10 July 1999 (age 27)	0	(France) Narbonne
Rémi Cardon	Back row	30 January 1991 (age 35)	7	(France) Beaune
Saïd Hireche	Back row	27 May 1985 (age 41)	1	(France) Brive
Jordan Lavocat	Back row	1 May 1993 (age 33)	2	(France) Hyères
Frédéric Medves	Back row	27 August 1984 (age 41)	5	(France) Blagnac
Gauthier Saieb	Back row	7 May 1994 (age 32)	2	(France) Stade Métropolitain
Marvyn Youcef	Back row	21 October 1996 (age 29)	0	(France) Marcquois
Johan Bensalla	Scrum-half	1 April 1991 (age 35)	8	(France) Lombez Samatan
Mathieu Lorée	Scrum-half	18 June 1987 (age 39)	3	(France) Valence Romans
Lucien Maman	Scrum-half	26 February 1994 (age 32)	2	(France) Paris Université
Enzo Kralfa	Fly-half	11 April 1996 (age 30)	3	(France) Marmande
Alexis Renou	Fly-half	16 September 1995 (age 30)	2	(France) Valence d'Agen
Yoan Saby	Fly-half	13 July 1995 (age 31)	5	(France) Tyrosse
Mohamed Belguidoum	Centre	24 January 1994 (age 32)	10	(France) Saint-Denis
Nabil Djalout	Centre	28 March 1989 (age 37)	2	(France) Céret
Maxime Meneghini	Centre	27 November 1993 (age 32)	10	(France) Gruissan
Meddy Moussaoui	Centre	30 January 1994 (age 32)	2	(France) Rumilly
Mehdi Chouchane	Wing	8 September 1990 (age 35)	7	(France) Bédarrides
Yanis Guitoune	Wing	21 January 1994 (age 32)	2	(France) Appaméen
Nadir Megdoud	Wing	26 March 1997 (age 29)	3	(France) Beauvais
Djamel Ouchene	Wing	31 January 1988 (age 38)	10	(France) Appaméen
Sami Shahba	Wing	29 May 1994 (age 32)	2	(France) Vienne
Benjamin Caminati	Fullback	20 October 1989 (age 36)	2	(France) Albi
Julien Caminati	Fullback	28 October 1985 (age 40)	0	(France) Stade Niçois

== Coaches ==
=== Current coaching staff ===
The current coaching staff of the Algerian national team:

Name	Nationality	Role
Ousmane Mané	SEN	Head coach
Nasser Benamor	ALG	Assistant coach (Forwards)
Boris Brahim Bouhraoua	ALG	Assistant coach (Backs)
Nordine Badji	ALG	Assistant coach (Backs)
Thomas Drouin	FRA	Strength & Conditioning coach
Rouabah Nahim	ALG	Strength & Conditioning coach
Mustapha Bouguendouz	ALG	Physiotherapist
Yanis Hannouche	ALG	Physiotherapist

=== Historical coaches ===
On 31 August 2021, the Senegalese Ousmane Mané was chosen by the FAR as the coach of the national selection succeeding to Boumedienne Allam.
Below is a list of historical coaches of the Algeria rugby union national team.

Year	Coach
2007–2011	(Algeria) Morad Kellal
2011–2017	(Algeria) Salah Rebadj (Algeria) Djemaï Tebani (Algeria) Foudil Youbi
2017–2021	(Algeria) Boumedienne Allam
2021–	(Senegal) Ousmane Mané

== Individual all-time records ==
=== Most caps ===
#	Player	Pos	Span	Mat	Pts	Tries	Conv	Pens	Drop	Won	Lost	Draw	Win %
1.	Rabah Abdelkader	Flanker	2015–present	13	5	1	0	0	0	9	4	0	69.23
2.	Boris Bouhraoua	Scrum-half	2015–present	12	11	1	3	0	0	8	4	0	66.67
3.	Nasser Benamor	Prop	2015–2018	11	5	1	0	0	0	7	4	0	63.64
4.	Khaled Kahlouchi	Flanker	2015–present	10	10	2	0	0	0	7	3	0	70.00
4.	Mohamed Belguidoum	Centre	2015–present	10	10	2	0	0	0	7	3	0	70.00
4.	Djamel Ouchene	Wing	2015–present	10	15	3	0	0	0	7	1	0	87.50
4.	Maxim Meneghini	Centre	2016–present	10	0	0	0	0	0	7	3	0	70.00
8.	Lou Bouhraoua	Scrum-half	2015–present	9	11	0	1	3	0	5	4	0	55.56
9.	Johan Bensalla	Scrum-half	2015–present	8	59	0	7	13	2	7	2	0	77.78
9.	Sofiane Chellat	Prop	2015–present	8	0	0	0	0	0	7	2	0	77.78
9.	Yazid Chouchane	Wing	2015–present	8	10	2	0	0	0	5	3	0	62.50

Last updated: Uganda vs Algeria, 18 July 2021. Statistics include officially capped matches only.

=== Most tries ===
#	Player	Pos	Span	Mat	Pts	Tries	Conv	Pens	Drop
1.	Yazid Chouchane	Wing	2015–present	8	15	3	0	0	0
1.	Rémi Cardon	Flanker	2017–present	5	15	3	0	0	0
3.	Yakine Djebbari	lock	2016–present	6	10	2	0	0	0
3.	Djamel Ouchene	Wing	2015–present	8	10	2	0	0	0
3.	Mohamed Belguidoum	centre	2015–present	9	10	2	0	0	0
3.	Walid Batchali	Flanker	2018–present	3	10	2	0	0	0

Last updated: Algeria vs Zambia, 20 October 2018. Statistics include officially capped matches only.

=== Most points ===
#	Player	Pos	Span	Mat	Pts	Tries	Conv	Pens	Drop
1.	Johan Bensalla	Fly-half	2015–present	7	59	0	7	13	2
2.	Yoan Saby	Fly-half	2017–present	5	22	0	5	4	0
3.	Yazid Chouchane	Wing	2015–present	8	15	3	0	0	0
3.	Rémi Cardon	Flanker	2017–present	5	15	3	0	0	0
5.	Enzo Kralfa	Scrum-half	2018–present	3	14	1	1	3	0
6.	Lou Bouhraoua	Scrum-half	2015–present	9	11	0	1	3	0
6.	Boris Bouhraoua	Scrum-half	2015–present	11	11	1	3	0	0
8.	Mohamed Belguidoum	centre	2015–present	9	10	2	0	0	0
8.	Walid Batchali	Flanker	2018–present	3	10	2	0	0	0

Last updated: Algeria vs Zambia, 20 October 2018. Statistics include officially capped matches only.

=== Most points in a match ===
#	Player	Pos	Pts	Tries	Conv	Pens	Drop	Opposition	Venue	Date
1.	Johan Bensalla	Scrum-half	15	0	0	5	0	Tunisia	(Algeria) Oran	24 December 2016
2.	Yoan Saby	Fly-half	11	0	1	3	0	Ivory Coast	(France) Toulouse	14 July 2018
2.	Johan Bensalla	Scrum-half	11	0	1	3	0	Tunisia	(Algeria) Oran	18 December 2015
4.	Johan Bensalla	Scrum-half	10	0	2	2	0	Zambia	(Zambia) Mufulira	4 November 2017
4.	Rémi Cardon	Flanker	10	2	0	0	0	Zambia	(Zambia) Mufulira	4 November 2017
4.	Enzo Kralfa	Scrum-half	10	1	1	1	0	Senegal	(France) Toulouse	8 July 2018

Last updated: Algeria vs Zambia, 20 October 2018. Statistics include officially capped matches only.

== See also ==
- Rugby union in Algeria
- Algerian Rugby Federation
