= 2011 Rugby World Cup – repechage qualification =

The 2011 Rugby World Cup qualifying process ended with a play-off to decide the 20th and final qualifier. Four teams, the best non-qualifier from each region except Oceania, competed for the last place at the 2011 Rugby World Cup finals in New Zealand. Romania beat Uruguay in the play-off final, and went on to compete in Pool B in New Zealand, along with Argentina, England, Scotland and Georgia.

The play-off was contested on a knockout basis, with a semi-final and a two-legged home and away final. One semi-final featured Romania, the winner of the European Nations Cup Champions Playoff Series, defeating Tunisia, the loser of the African final. The other saw Uruguay, the loser of Round Four of the Americas qualification, beat Kazakhstan, the second-place finisher at the 2010 Asian Five Nations.

The host of each semi-final was the team with the higher IRB Ranking at the moment when it became known who the two teams were.

Romania won the final over Uruguay with a victory and a draw to qualify for the 2011 Rugby World Cup.

== Participants ==
Qualifying zone	Nation
Africa	Tunisia (34**)
Americas	Uruguay (22*)
Asia	Kazakhstan (26*)
Europe	Romania (19**)

* IRB World Rankings on 22 May 2010, the date that both the Asia and Americas qualifiers were known.
** IRB World Rankings on 5 June 2010, the date that both the African and European qualifiers were known.

== Preliminary round ==
17 July 2010

Romania	56–13	Tunisia

Stadionul Gloria, Buzău
Referee: Pascal Gauzere (France)

17 July 2010

Uruguay	44–7	Kazakhstan

Estadio Charrúa, Montevideo
Referee: Francisco Pastrana (Argentina)

== Qualification final ==
Team 1	Agg.	Team 2	1st leg	2nd leg
Romania	60–33	Uruguay	21–21	39–12

=== First leg ===
13 November 2010

Uruguay	21–21	Romania
	Report

Estadio Charrúa, Montevideo
Attendance: 10,000
Referee: Mark Lawrence (South Africa)

=== Second leg ===
27 November 2010

Romania	39–12	Uruguay
	Report

Stadionul Naţional de Rugby, Bucharest
Attendance: 5,000
Referee: Alain Rolland (Ireland)

== Sources ==
- Official site
