= Saïd Hireche =

French-Algerian rugby union player

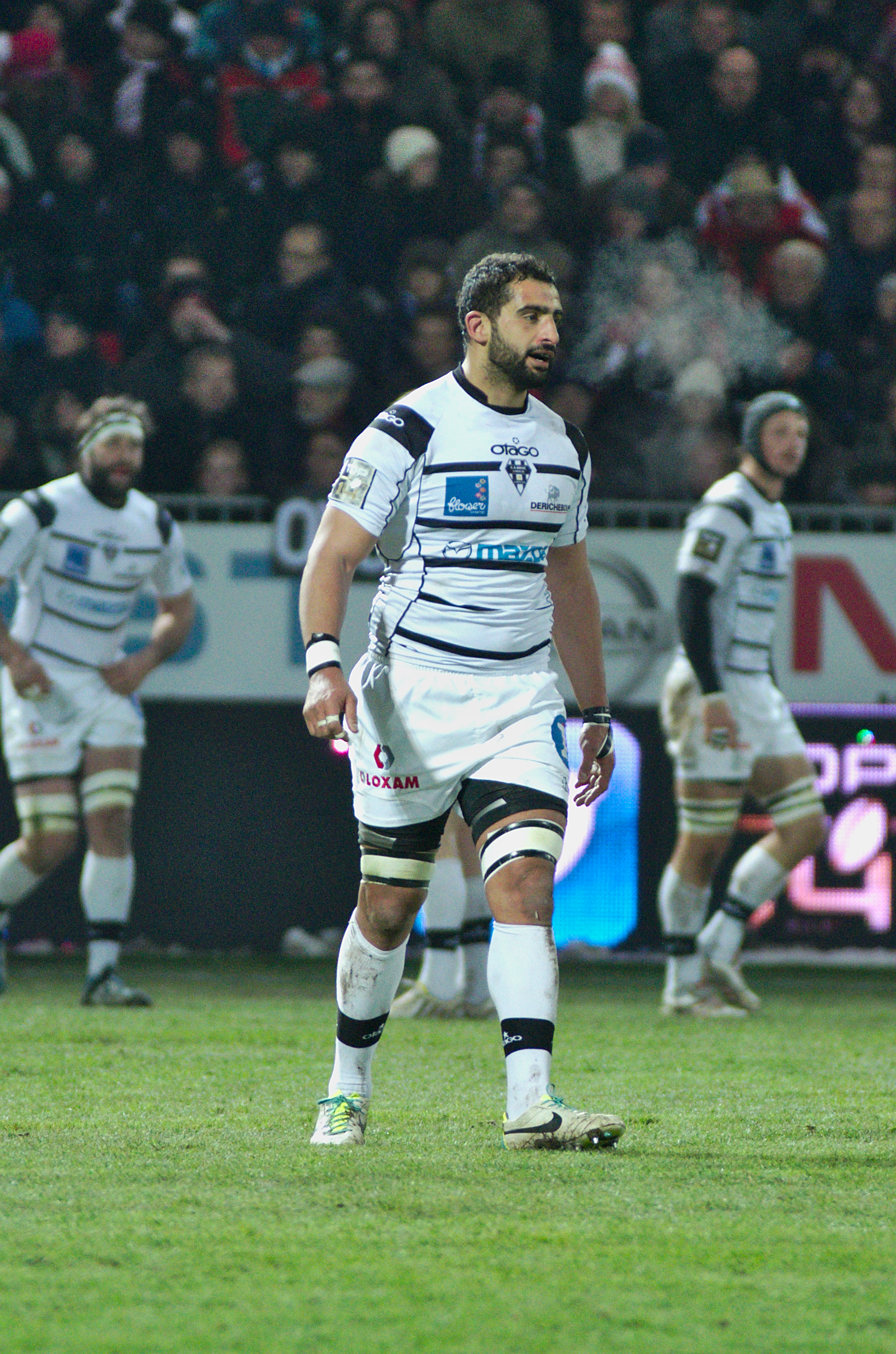

Personal information
- Full name: Saïd Hireche
- Born: 27 May 1985 (age 40); Mantes-la-Jolie, France
- Height: 6 ft 0 in (1.83 m)

Playing information
- Position: positions
Club
Years	Team	Pld	T	G	FG	P
2005–2008	Stade Français	9	0	0	0	0
2008–2012	Aurillac	102	6	0	0	30
2012–	CA Brive	235	11	0	0	55
	Total	346	17	0	0	85
Representative
Years	Team	Pld	T	G	FG	P
2007	Algeria	1	0	0	0	0
- Source: As of 5 April 2023

Saïd Hireche (born 27 May 1985) is a French-Algerian rugby union player who currently plays for CA Brive and is an Algerian international. He plays as a Flanker.
