= Rugby union in Chad =

Rugby union in Chad is a minor but growing sport.

== Governing body ==
The governing body is affiliated to the Confederation of African Rugby, but not to the International Rugby Board.

== History ==
Rugby union was introduced into Chad by the colonial French.

As with many minor rugby nations, rugby is centred on the capital, N'Djamena.

It was mostly played by European expatriates, and with the departure of the French became dormant. However, its linguistic ties with France - French being one of the official languages - means that Chadians are exposed to both French rugby coverage as well as there being a substantial Chadian presence in France itself.

Like many North African countries, the historical connection with France is a mixed blessing. For a number of years, Chadian rugby players would leave to play there, which deprived Chadian rugby of any real competition.

The Chad national rugby union team represents Chad in international rugby union, and competes in the north section of the CAR Castel Beer Trophy.

== See also ==
- Chad national rugby union team
- Confederation of African Rugby
- Africa Cup
