= Réunion Rugby Committee =

Comité Territorial de Rugby de la Réunion
- Sport: Rugby union
- Website: rugby-reunion.fr

The Réunion Rugby Committee (French: Comité de Rugby de la Réunion, —or officially: Comité Territorial de Rugby de la Réunion) is a committee under the umbrella of the French Rugby Federation which is the governing body for rugby union within Réunion.

The organisation was previously Ligue Régionale de Rugby de la Réunion, but was upgraded to committee status in 2008. It is affiliated with the Confederation of African Rugby (CAR), which is the regional governing body for rugby union in Africa, but it is not affiliated with the International Rugby Board (IRB) in its own right.

== National teams ==
As an overseas department of France, Réunion can participate in international competition, but not for the Rugby World Cup. Réunion has thus far competed in the south section of the CAR Development Trophy along with African nations.

== See also ==
- Rugby union in Réunion
- Réunion national rugby union team
