= Algerian rugby sevens Championship =

National rugby sevens club competition

National rugby sevens Championship
- Current season, competition or edition: 2021–22 Algerian rugby sevens Championship
- Sport: Rugby sevens
- Founded: 2018
- Country: Algeria
- Most recent champion: ES Bologhine (1st title)
- Most titles: Stade Oranais; ES Bologhine (1 title each)

The Algerian National rugby sevens Championship is a rugby sevens club competition that is played in Algeria and created in 2018. The national championship of rugby began in 2018, it was learned by the president of the Algerian Rugby Federation (FAR), Sofiane Benhacen.

== History ==
The first edition was held in the 2018–19 season. It was won by Stade Oranais. The second one was held two years after in the 2021–22 season and was won by the Etoile Sportive de Bologhine (ES Bologhine).

== List of winners ==
Season	Winners	Score	Runner-up
2018–19	Stade Oranais	^{n/a}	RC Arzew
2019–20	Not held due to the COVID-19 pandemic in Algeria		
2020–21	Not held due to the COVID-19 pandemic in Algeria		
2021–22	ES Bologhine	^{n/a}	Stade Oranais

^n/a: A round-robin tournament determined the final standings.

== Champions by club ==
#	Club	Wins	Runners-up	Winning years
1	Stade Oranais	1	1	2018–19
2	ES Bologhine	1	0	2021–22
3	RC Arzew	0	1	
