= Salim Tebani =

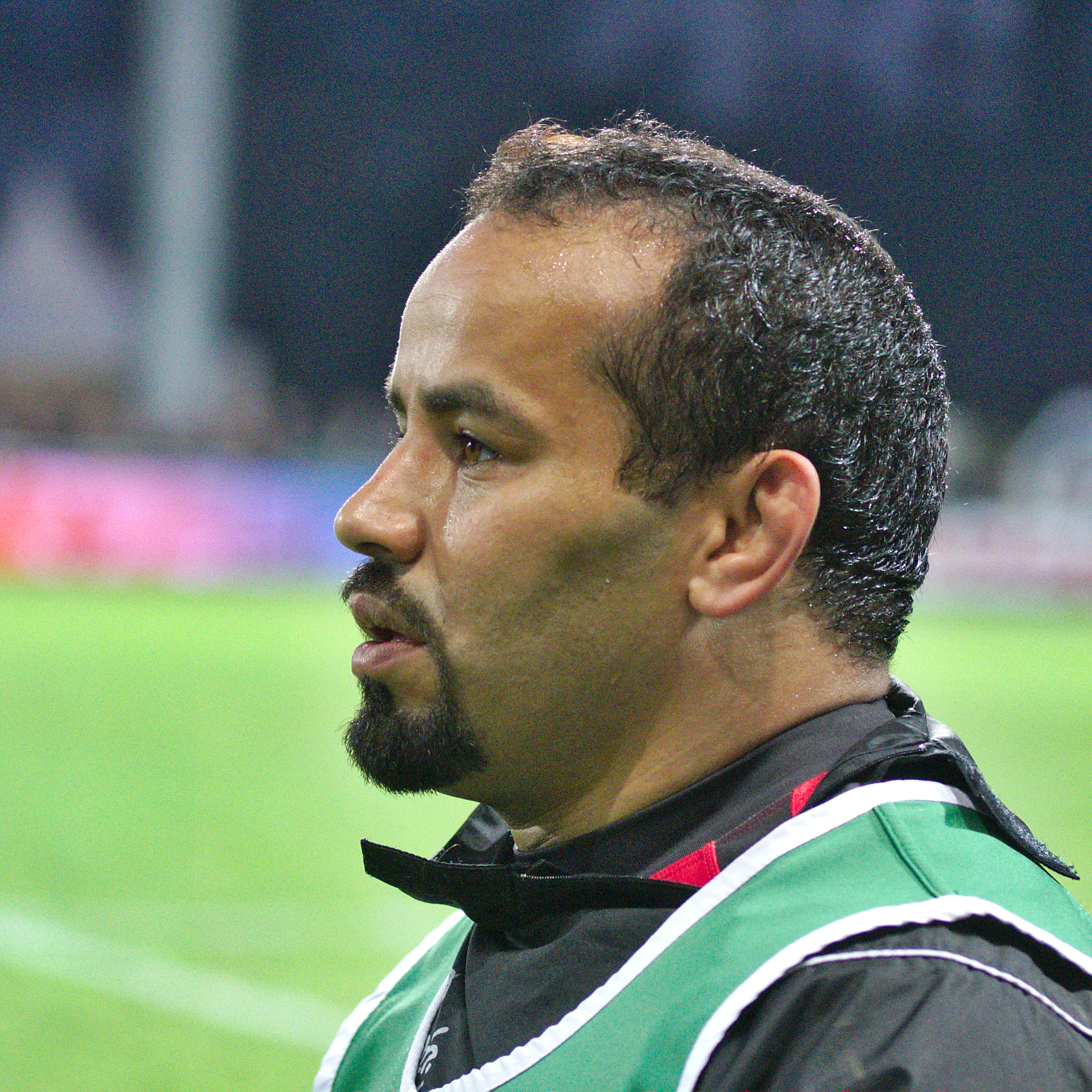
- Born: October 11, 1978 (age 48) M'Sila, Algeria
- Height: 1.7 m (5 ft 7 in)
- Weight: 99 kg (218 lb; 15 st 8 lb)

Rugby union career
- Position: Hooker
International career
Years	Team	Apps	(Points)
2007-Present	Algeria		

Salim Tebani (born 11 October 1978 in M'Sila) is a retired French-Algerian rugby union player and current coach of the Algerian national rugby union team.

Tebani first played rugby at the highest level in France for Stade Français, where he started playing for the first team in 1996/97 and would go on to play for them until the 2004/05 season. He then played for Lyon OU in 2005/06, and at Football Club Sportif Rumilly in 2006/07. He also had a stint for US Oyonnax during 2007/08.

Tebani is an ex international player for Algeria since his debut in 2007. His preferred position was hooker.
