= 2008–09 Africa Cup =

9th Africa Cup
Tournament details
- Date: 14 May 2008– 27 November 2009
- Teams: 19

Final positions
- Champions: Namibia
- Runner-up: Tunisia

Tournament statistics
- Matches played: 14

The 2008–09 Africa Cup is the ninth edition of highest level rugby union tournament in Africa. The competition involves twelve teams that are divided into two zones (North and South). Each zone is then divided into two pools of three. Each pool winner then qualifies for a semi-final; the semi-final winners then play each other in the final.

== Teams ==
- Botswana
- Cameroon
- Ivory Coast
- Kenya
- Madagascar
- Morocco
- Namibia
- Nigeria
- Senegal
- Eswatini
- Tunisia
- Uganda
- Zambia
- Zimbabwe

== Format ==
The tournament will be used as the first stage of qualification for Rugby World Cup 2011. The top two teams will progress in the World Cup and in the Africa Cup, which will be the main tournament for the African qualifiers. Swaziland, Nigeria and Botswana have been added to the qualification process as they possess an IRB ranking. A two-legged playoff between the two lowest ranked teams from the south (Botswana and Swaziland) and the two lowest ranked teams from the north (Cameroon and Nigeria) will begin the tournament to take the competition numbers from 14 to 12 to make the group stage four groups of three teams.

== Division 1 (Africa Cup) ==
=== Playoff round ===
11 May 2008

Cameroon	26 – 6	Nigeria

Yaoundé

17 May 2008

Botswana	25 – 7	Eswatini

Gaborone

=== Pool Stage ===
Pool winners qualify for the semi-finals. Top teams also progress to second stage of world cup qualification, in the Africa Cup. Pools determined through world rankings.

Bonus point system: 4 points for a win, 2 for a draw, 0 for a loss, 1 point for scoring four tries in a game, 1 point for losing by seven or less.

==== Pool A ====
Team	P	W	D	Lost	For	Ag.	Diff.	TB	LB	Points	Notes
Namibia	2	2	0	0	48	31	+17	1	0	9	To semifinals
Senegal	1	0	0	1	10	13	-3	0	1	1	to 2009 Africa Trophy North
Zimbabwe	1	0	0	1	21	35	-14	0	0	0	to 2009 Africa Trophy South

14 June 2008

Senegal	10 – 13	Namibia

Stade Leopold Senghor, Dakar

Zimbabwe	Cancelled	Senegal

2 August 2008

Namibia	35 – 21	Zimbabwe

Hage Geingob Rugby Stadium, Windhoek

==== Pool B ====
Team	P	W	D	Lost	For	Ag.	Diff.	TB	LB	Points	Notes
Ivory Coast	2	2	0	0	53	18	+35	1	0	9	to semifinals
Morocco	2	1	0	1	38	39	-1	1	0	5	to 2009 Africa Trophy North
Zambia	2	0	0	2	27	61	-34	0	0	0	to 2009 Africa Trophy South

14 June 2008

Zambia	18 – 29	Morocco

Lusaka

12 July 2008

Ivory Coast	32 – 9	Zambia

Stade Félix Houphouët-Boigny, Abidjan

2 August 2008

Morocco	9 – 21	Ivory Coast

COC Stadium, Casablanca

==== Pool C ====
Team	P	W	D	Lost	For	Ag.	Diff.	TB	LB	Points	Notes
Tunisia	2	2	0	0	60	25	+35	1	0	9	to semifinals
Kenya	2	1	0	1	91	52	+39	1	0	5	to 2009 Africa Trophy North
Cameroon	2	0	0	2	18	92	-74	0	1	1	to 2009 Africa Trophy North

14 June 2008

Cameroon	12 – 16	Tunisia

Yaoundé

12 July 2008

Kenya	76 – 8	Cameroon

E.A. Union Ground, Nairobi

2 August 2008

Tunisia	44 – 15	Kenya

Stade El Menzah, Tunis

==== Pool D ====
Team	P	W	D	Lost	For	Ag.	Diff.	TB	LB	Points	Notes
Uganda	2	2	0	0	59	32	+27	2	0	10	to semifinals
Madagascar	2	1	0	1	67	47	+20	1	0	5	to 2009 Africa Trophy South
Botswana	2	0	0	2	25	72	-47	0	0	0	to 2009 Africa Trophy South

14 June 2008

Botswana	10 – 27	Uganda

Gaborone

12 July 2008

Madagascar	45 – 15	Botswana

Stade Municipal de Mahamasina, Antananarivo

2 August 2008

Uganda	32 – 22	Madagascar

Kyodondo Rugby Club, Kampala

=== Knockout stage ===
==== Semifinals ====
Semi finals and final of this edition of the Africa Cup are to take place in 2009 doubling as the final leg of African Rugby World Cup qualification.

13 June 2009

Uganda	17 – 41	Tunisia

Kyodondo Rugby Club, Kampala

27 June 2009

Tunisia	38 – 13	Uganda

Stade El Menzah, Tunis

- Tunisia won the series with aggregate results of 79-30

14 June 2009

Ivory Coast	13 – 13	Namibia

Stade Félix Houphouët-Boigny, Abidjan

27 June 2009

Namibia	54 – 14	Ivory Coast

Hage Geingob Rugby Stadium, Windhoek

- Namibia won the series with aggregate results of 67-27

==== Final ====
14 November 2009

Tunisia	13 – 18	Namibia

Stade El Menzah, Tunis

28 November 2009

Namibia	22 – 10	Tunisia

Hage Geingob Rugby Stadium, Windhoek

- Namibia won the series with aggregate results of 40-23
