= Algerian rugby union Championship =

National rugby union Championship
- Current season, competition or edition: 2021–22 Algerian rugby union Championship
- Sport: Rugby union
- Founded: 2017
- No. of teams: 13
- Country: Algeria
- Most recent champion: Stade Oranais (1st title)
- Most titles: Stade Oranais (1 title)
- Relegation to: Algerian rugby union Championship D2

The Algerian National rugby union Championship is a rugby union club competition that is played in Algeria and created in 2017. The national championship of rugby began in November 2018, it was learned by the president of the Algerian Rugby Federation (FAR), Sofiane Benhacen.

== History ==
The FAR president, Sofiane Benhacen, announced at the end of December 2016 the launch in September 2017 of the first edition of the national rugby championship. The 20 rugby union teams that exist in Algeria would be divided into two pools, Center-West and Center-East, but it never saw the light of day.

Finally, the first Algerian championship in the history of Algerian rugby kicked off in November 2018. It ended on May 3, 2019, in Blida after a series of five regional tournaments (Algiers, Oran, Msila, Sidi Bel Abbès and Arzew) and a final tournament in Blida which won the best team. The first edition was won by Stade Oranais.

== List of winners ==
Season	Winners	Score	Runner-up
2018–19	Stade Oranais	^{n/a}	JF Bordj El Kiffan
2019–20	Not held due to the COVID-19 pandemic in Algeria		
2020–21	Not held due to the COVID-19 pandemic in Algeria		
2021–22	TBD		

^n/a: A round-robin tournament determined the final standings.

== Champions by club ==
#	Club	Wins	Runners-up	Winning years
1	Stade Oranais	1	0	2018–19
2	JF Bordj El Kiffan	0	1	
