= Rugby union in Réunion =

- Country: Réunion
- Governing body: French Rugby Federation; Comité Territorial de Rugby de la Réunion
- National team: Réunion

Rugby union in Réunion is a minor but growing sport.

== Governing body ==
The Comité Territorial de Rugby de la Réunion is a committee under the umbrella of the French Rugby Federation which is the governing body for rugby union within Réunion.

The committee is not affiliated to the IRB in its own right, but it is affiliated to Confederation of African Rugby (CAR), which is the regional governing body for Africa.

== History ==
Rugby was first introduced to the Réunion by the French. Isolated in rugby terms, Réunion competes in the Africa Cup. More talented players tend to leave for Metropolitan France.

== See also ==
- Réunion national rugby union team
- Rugby union in France
