= 2009 Africa Trophy =

The 2009 Africa Trophy was the first edition of rugby union intermediate African championship for national teams.

== North Zone ==
2009 Africa Trophy North
Tournament details
- Host: Morocco
- Date: 8–11 July
- Countries: Cameroon; Kenya; Morocco; Senegal

Final positions
- Champions: Morocco
- Runner-up: Kenya

Tournament statistics
- Matches played: 4

The tournament was played in Safi, Morocco.

=== Semifinals ===
8 July 2009

Kenya	22 - 7	Senegal

Safi

8 July 2009

Morocco	12 - 0	Cameroon

Safi

=== 3rd-4th place payoff ===
11 July 2009

Senegal	11 - 3	Cameroon

Safi

=== Final ===
11 July 2009

Morocco	29 - 11	Kenya

Safi

== South Zone ==
2009 Africa Trophy South
Tournament details
- Host: Botswana
- Date: 8–11 July
- Countries: Botswana; Madagascar; Mauritius; Réunion; Zambia; Zimbabwe

Final positions
- Champions: Zimbabwe
- Runner-up: Madagascar

Tournament statistics
- Matches played: 9

The tournament was played in Gaborone, Botswana. It was also of the first two of division one of south section of 2008 CAR Development Trophy.

Place	Nation	Games				Points		Bonus	Table points
Place	Nation	played	won	drawn	lost	for	against	Bonus	Table points
1	Zimbabwe	3	3	0	0	68	33	2	14
2	Madagascar	3	2	0	1	94	73	3	11
3	Mauritius	3	2	0	1	43	31	3	11
4	Botswana	3	2	0	1	58	50	2	10
5	Réunion	3	0	0	3	53	85	1	1
6	Zambia	2	0	0	3	33	77	1	1

20 July 2009

Zimbabwe	31 - 22	Madagascar

Gaborone

20 July 2009

Botswana	16 - 10	Zambia

Gaborone

20 July 2009

Mauritius	10 - 9	Réunion

Gaborone

22 July 2009

Botswana	39 - 17	Réunion

Gaborone

22 July 2009

Zimbabwe	14 - 8	Mauritius

Gaborone

22 July 2009

Madagascar	36 - 15	Zambia

Gaborone

25 July 2009

Zimbabwe	23 - 3	Botswana

Gaborone

25 July 2009

Madagascar	36 - 27	Réunion

Gaborone

25 July 2009

Mauritius	25 - 8	Zambia

Gaborone
