= Boumedienne Allam =

French-born Algerian rugby union player

- Born: 19 November 1979 (age 46) Avignon
- Height: 1.95 m (6 ft 5 in)
- Weight: 110 kg (17 st 5 lb)

Rugby union career
- Position: Number eight
Senior career
Years	Team	Apps	(Points)
1994–1996	Apt		
1996–1997	Cavaillon		
1997–2000	RC Toulon		
2000–2003	RC Narbonne		
2003–2004	Tarbes Pyrénées Rugby		
2004–2005	FC Auch		
2005–2006	FC Barcelona		
2006–2008	Blagnac SCR		
2008–2009	Doncaster Knights		
2009–2010	Le Bugue AC		
2010–2012	AS Mâcon		
International career
Years	Team	Apps	(Points)
2007-	Algeria		

Boumedienne Allam (born Avignon, 19 November 1979) is a French and Algerian rugby union player. He plays as a number eight.

After his young years at Apt (1994–1996) and Cavaillon (1996–1997), he became a famous figure as a RC Toulon player (1997–2000), where he won the Cup of France Frantz Reichel, in 1998. He moved to RC Narbonne (2000–2003), and latter to Tarbes Pyrénées Rugby (2003–2004) and to FC Auch (2004–2005). After a season at FC Barcelona, in Spain (2005–2006), he moved back to France, where he played for Blagnac SCR. He played for the Doncaster Knights, in England, in 2008/09. He returned to France, playing for Le Bugue AC, in 2009/10. He played for AS Mâcon, from 2010/11 to 2011/12, and currently plays for AGDE, since the 2012/13 season.

== International career ==
Allam was capped for the France U-21 squad, winning the Six Nations Tournament of that category with them in 2000. A few years later, Allam switched alliance and chose the country of his grandparents to represent in senior fixtures. He was a member of the historical unofficial first game of Algeria, on 24 February 2007, as well as the official first match for Algeria on 18 December since creating the Algerian rugby federation a month earlier. This significant match was also the first rugby international played on Algerian soil which was televised.
