= DR Congo national rugby union team =

National sports team

DR Congo
- Union: Fédération Congolaise de Rugby

First international
- DR Congo 22–0 Congo (Kinshasa, Democratic Republic of the Congo; 18 January 2009)

Largest win
- Congo 9–37 DR Congo (Brazzaville, Congo; 23 February 2010)

Largest defeat
- Burundi 27–0 DR Congo (Kigali, Rwanda; 5 June 2014)

The Democratic Republic of the Congo national rugby union team (French: Équipe de République Démocratique du Congo de rugby à XV) represents DR Congo in men's international competitions, it is a member of the International Rugby Board (IRB), and has yet to play in a Rugby World Cup tournament.

They were due to appear in the 2008 Castel Beer Trophy, but they were replaced by Belgian club side Kibubu after they pulled out for financial reasons.

In continental play, the Leopards XV have won two regional titles in Rugby Africa play, this came with victories in the 2015 Africa Cup South East and the 2016 Africa Cup Division 2 East tournaments and a third place finish in the 2014 Africa Cup Division 2 South competition.

== Record ==
Below is a table of the representative rugby matches officially played by the Democratic Republic of the Congo national XV at test level up until 7 October 2017. Updated after the match with Burundi.

Opponent	Played	Won	Lost	Drawn	% Won
Burundi	1	0	1	0	0%
Congo	3	3	0	0	100%
Rwanda	3	3	0	0	100%
Total	7	6	1	0	85.71%

== See also ==
- Rugby union in the Democratic Republic of the Congo
