= Morad Kellal =

- Born: 23 May 1960 (age 66) Bourg-en-Bresse

Rugby union career
Coaching career
- Years: Team
- Algeria

Morad Kellal (born Bourg-en-Bresse, 23 May 1960) is a French-born Algerian rugby union coach. He was also a rugby union referee and a sport educator. Kellal is one of the main responsibles for the organization of rugby union in Algeria and his main purpose is the creation of an Algerian Rugby Federation. He was the first coach of Algeria national rugby union team. Actually, he is teaching the art of rugby in Canada's schools, especially in the province of Quebec, trying to demystify that sport which is not as popular as it should be there.
