= Rugby union in the Republic of the Congo =

Rugby union is a minor but growing sport in the Republic of the Congo.

== Governing body ==
The national union is a member of the Confederation of African Rugby, but not of the International Rugby Board.

== History ==
Rugby union was introduced into the country by the French, who ruled the country for a number of years.

Rugby is centred on the national capital, Brazzaville. The Congo lacks good transport networks and along with its political instability, civil war, and the extreme poverty of the country, it is difficult for it to maintain a proper national league structure.

Like many African countries, the historical connection with France is a mixed blessing. For a number of years, Congolese rugby players would leave to play there, which deprived rugby in the Congo of any real competition.

== See also ==
- Republic of the Congo national rugby union team
- Confederation of African Rugby
- Africa Cup
