= 2008 South American Rugby Championship "B" =

9° Campeonato Sudamericano de Rugby B
Tournament details
- Host: Paraguay
- Date: 4–10 November 2008
- Countries: Brazil; Colombia; Paraguay; Peru; Venezuela

Final positions
- Champions: Brazil
- Runner-up: Paraguay

Tournament statistics
- Matches played: 10

The 2008 South American Rugby Championship "B" doubled as World Cup qualifiers. It was the ninth edition of this competition.

== Standings ==
Team	Played	Won	Drawn	Lost	For	Against	Difference	BP	Pts
Brazil	4	4	0	0	169	20	+149	3	19
Paraguay	4	3	0	1	181	25	+156	3	15
Venezuela	4	2	0	2	86	123	−37	2	10
Colombia	4	1	0	3	53	148	−95	0	4
Peru	4	0	0	4	23	196	−173	1	1

== Matches ==
19 June 2008

Brazil	34 - 6	Colombia

Asunción

19 June 2008

Paraguay	44 - 3	Venezuela

Asunción

21 June 2008

Paraguay	71 - 0	Peru

Asunción

21 June 2008

Venezuela	32 - 15	Colombia

Asunción

23 June 2008

Brazil	61 - 7	Venezuela

Asunción

23 June 2008

Colombia	25 - 20	Peru

Asunción

26 June 2008

Brazil	59 - 0	Peru

Asunción

26 June 2008

Paraguay	60 - 7	Colombia

Asunción

29 June 2008

Brazil	15 - 6	Paraguay

Asunción

29 June 2008

Venezuela	41 - 3	Peru

Asunción
