= Rugby union in Mayotte =

Rugby union in Mayotte is a minor but growing sport.

== Governing body ==
The governing body is the French Rugby Federation, which has a regional section called the Ligue Regionale de Rugby de Mayotte.

== History ==
Rugby was introduced to Mayotte by the French who colonised the area. Isolated in rugby terms, Mayotte competes in the Africa Cup. More talented players tend to leave for Metropolitan France.

There are also strong links with rugby union in Madagascar, where it is a reasonably popular sport.

The most successful club in Mayotte is RC Mamoudzou, which has won every national championship from 2000–2009. In 2009, the result of the championship final between Mamoudzou and RC Petite Terre was 27–7.

== See also ==
- Mayotte national rugby union team
- Confederation of African Rugby
- Africa Cup
- Rugby union in France
