= 2011 Rugby World Cup – Asia qualification =

Asia's World Cup qualifiers will be centred on its flagship tournament, the Asian Five Nations. The winner of the 2010 tournament will qualify, but to give all teams a chance of qualification the 2008 and 2009 seasons will also be part of the qualification process. In total, 13 teams participated in the qualifying tournament, as in 2007, with 12 of the teams being the same (Guam competed in 2007, but were replaced by Pakistan in the 2011 qualification process).

== Round 1 ==
Due to the nature of the qualifying process, 2008 was the only year that a Division Two nation could continue in the process to qualify for the 2011 Rugby World Cup. Since the winner of the 2010 Asian Five Nations will be Asia's representative, there would not be enough time for any team competing in or below Division Two after 2008 to reach the top division in time, rendering them effectively eliminated. The tournament was played in June 2008 in Bangkok, Thailand and was won by the hosts who were promoted, thus continuing their qualification hopes. The last place team from Division One was to face relegation to Division Two for 2009, effectively eliminating them from qualification as well. China was unable to compete in Division One due to visa complications and they were relegated to Division Two, last placed Sri Lanka stayed up.

Semi-finals
June 11, 2008
Malaysia	30
Pakistan	5
June 11, 2008
Thailand	30
India	22

Final
June 14, 2008
Malaysia	7
Thailand	30
3rd-Place final
June 14, 2008
Pakistan	0
India	92

== Round 2 ==
Due to the nature of the qualifying process, 2009 was the last chance that a Division One nation could continue in the process to qualify for the 2011 Rugby World Cup. Since the winner of the 2010 Asian Five Nations will be Asia's representative, any team competing in Division One after 2009 will be effectively eliminated. The last place team from the 2009 Asian Five Nations Top Five, Singapore, was relegated to Division One, eliminating them from qualification. The Arabian Gulf team won the 2009 Division One tournament on April 11 to earn promotion to the 2010 Asian Five Nations Top Five and remain in contention for qualification to the 2011 Rugby World Cup.

Semi-finals
April 8, 2009
Chinese Taipei	36
Sri Lanka	24
April 8, 2009
Arabian Gulf	36
Thailand	17

Final
April 11, 2009
Arabian Gulf	44
Chinese Taipei	24
3rd-Place final
April 11, 2009
Sri Lanka	51
Thailand	17

== Round 3 ==
The winner of this tournament, Japan, qualified for the Pool A of the 2011 Rugby World Cup, where they faced New Zealand, France, Tonga, and Canada. Kazakhstan, the runner up advanced to the semifinal of the 20th Place Playoff to face Uruguay.

Position	Nation	Games				Points				Table points	
Position	Nation	Played	Won	Drawn	Lost	For	Against	Difference	Tries	Bonus Points	Points
1	Japan	4	4	0	0	326	30	+296	50	4	24
2	Kazakhstan	4	2	0	2	94	173	–76	9	3	13
3	Hong Kong	4	2	0	2	65	133	–68	7	2	12
4	Arabian Gulf	4	2	0	2	70	128	–61	7	0	10
5	South Korea	4	0	0	4	65	156	–91	9	3	3

=== Fixtures ===
Home	Score (Tries)	Away	Match Information
Home	Score (Tries)	Away	Date	Venue
Hong Kong	32–8 (4–1)	South Korea	24-Apr-2010	Hong Kong FC Stadium, Hong Kong
Kazakhstan	43–28 (4–3)	Arabian Gulf	24-Apr-2010	National University Stadium, Almaty
Arabian Gulf	16–9 (1–0)	Hong Kong	30-Apr-2010	Bahrain Sports Club, Manama, Bahrain
South Korea	13–71 (1–11)	Japan	1-May-2010	Gyeongsang Rugby Stadium, Daegu
Japan	60–5 (10–1)	Arabian Gulf	8-May-2010	Chichibunomiya Rugby Stadium, Tokyo
Hong Kong	19–15 (2–0)	Kazakhstan	8-May-2010	Hong Kong FC Stadium, Hong Kong
Arabian Gulf	21–19 (2–3)	South Korea	14-May-2010	The Sevens, Dubai, UAE
Kazakhstan	7–101 (1–15)	Japan	15-May-2010	Chichibunomiya Rugby Stadium, Tokyo
Japan	94–5 (14–1)	Hong Kong	22-May-2010	Chichibunomiya Rugby Stadium, Tokyo
South Korea	25–32 (4–4)	Kazakhstan	22-May-2010	Incheon Munhak Stadium, Incheon
