= Rugby union in the Democratic Republic of the Congo =

Rugby union in the Democratic Republic of the Congo is a minor but growing sport.

== Governing body ==
The national union is a member of the Confederation of African Rugby, but not of World Rugby.

== History ==
Rugby in the Democratic Republic of the Congo suffers from a number of hindrances, such as lack of good transport networks, general infrastructure, political instability and war, and also the extreme poverty of the country, which means it is difficult for it to maintain a proper national league structure. The DRC is a particularly large country, at 2,344,858 km2 (the 12th largest in the world), but without the necessary economy to maintain it.

The sport is centred on the national capital, Kinshasa.

Like many African countries, the historical connection with France is a mixed blessing. For a number of years, Congolese rugby players would leave to play in France, which deprived the sport of any real competition in the DRC.

== See also ==
- Democratic Republic of the Congo national rugby union team
- Confederation of African Rugby
- Africa Cup
