= Libya national rugby union team =

Libya
Team kit	Change kit

First international
- Algeria 50–0 Libya (Cairo, Egypt; 26 October 2010)

Largest win
- To be determined

Largest defeat
- Egypt 62–6 Libya (Cairo, Egypt; 20 December 2025)

World Cup
- Appearances: None

The Libya national rugby union team represents Libya in international rugby union. They are a not member of the World Rugby , and are yet to play in a Rugby World Cup tournament. The Libya national rugby team played their first ever international against Algeria in 2010, with Algeria winning the game 50 points to 0, during the 2010 CAR Development Trophy, played in Cairo, Egypt. Libya played a second match during the tournament, losing to Mauritania by 10 points to 5.

== Record ==
Below is a table of the representative rugby matches played by a Libya national XV at test level up until 20 December 2025, updated after match with Egypt.

Opponent	Played	Won	Lost	Drawn	% Won
Algeria	1	0	1	0	0%
Egypt	1	0	1	0	0%
Mauritania	1	0	1	0	0%
Total	3	0	3	0	0%
