= Egypt national rugby union team =

Egypt
- Union: Egyptian Rugby Football Union
- Coach: Seif Sonbaty

First international
- Egypt 10–5 Mauritania (Cairo, Egypt; 26 October 2010)

Largest win
- Egypt 62–6 Libya (Cairo, Egypt; 20 December 2025)

Largest defeat
- Egypt 0–50 Algeria (Cairo, Egypt; 29 October 2010)

World Cup
- Appearances: 0

The Egypt national rugby union team represents Egypt in rugby union. The national team was put together after the separation of the Arabian Gulf national rugby union team.

== Record ==
Below is a table of the representative rugby matches played by an Egypt national XV at test level up until 20 December 2025, updated after match with Libya.

Opponent	Played	Won	Lost	Drawn	% Won
Algeria	1	0	1	0	0%
Jordan	1	0	1	0	0%
Libya	1	1	0	0	100%
Mauritania	1	1	0	0	100%
Total	4	2	2	0	50%
