= 2015 Crescent Cup =

- Date: 6 – 14 June 2015
- Countries: Algeria; Kazakhstan; Lebanon; Malaysia; Uzbekistan

Final positions
- Champions: Malaysia (1st title)

Tournament statistics
- Matches played: 6

The 2015 Crescent Cup or the 2015 Islamic Nations Rugby Championship was the first edition of the expanded annual Muslim nation teams Crescent Cup. The tournament was held in Malacca, Malaysia from 6 to 14 June 2015, sanctioned by World Rugby and co-organised with the Malaysia Rugby Union under the auspices of the Islamic Solidarity Sports Federation.

Five teams took part in the competition: Algeria, Kazakhstan, Lebanon, Malaysia and Uzbekistan. Iran, normally the sixth team, withdrew from the tournament. Malaysia won the Championship, becoming the first team to win the tournament beating Algeria in the controversial final match, which was abandoned after a savage all-in brawl involving players, officials and spectators.

== Pool stage ==
Key to colours in pool tables
Qualified for the final
Qualified for the third place match

=== Pool A ===
Team	Pld	W	D	L	TF	PF	PA	+/−	Pts
Malaysia	2	2	0	0		65	9	+56	8
Lebanon	2	1	0	1		54	13	+41	4
Uzbekistan	2	0	0	2		12	109	–97	0

6 June 2015	Malaysia	10–0	Lebanon	Malaysia
8 June 2015	Lebanon	54–3	Uzbekistan	Malaysia
11 June 2015	Malaysia	55–9	Uzbekistan	Malaysia

=== Pool B ===
Team	Pld	W	D	L	TF	PF	PA	+/−	Pts
Algeria	2	2	0	0		41	5	+36	8
Kazakhstan	2	0	0	2		5	41	–36	0
Iran	withdrew								

6 June 2015	Algeria	26–5	Kazakhstan	Malaysia
10 June 2015	Algeria	15–0	Kazakhstan	Malaysia

== Knockout stage ==
=== Third place match ===
14 June 2015
14:30 MAS (UTC+8)

Lebanon	25–35	Kazakhstan

Merlimau Polytechnic Batang, Merlimau

=== Final ===
14 June 2015
16:30 MAS (UTC+8)

Malaysia	19–11 abandoned	Algeria

Merlimau Polytechnic Batang, Merlimau
Referee: Thammanoon Kuncharo (Thailand)
