= Chad national rugby union team =

Chad
- Union: Fédération Tchadienne de Rugby
- Founded: 2003
Team kit

First international
- Niger 24–0 Chad (Niamey, Niger; 24 March 2006)

Largest win
- Chad 13–0 Togo (Bamako, Mali; 30 July 2011)

Largest defeat
- Niger 54–0 Chad (Ouagadougou, Burkina Faso; 22 June 2007)

The Chad national rugby union team represents Chad in international rugby union. Chad is not a member of World Rugby (IRB) but is a member of the Confederation of African Rugby (CAR). It has yet to play in a Rugby World Cup tournament.

This team competes in the north section of the CAR Castel Beer Trophy.

== Record ==
Below is a table of the representative rugby matches played by a Chad national XV at test level up until 30 November 2011, updated after match with Togo.

Opponent	Played	Won	Lost	Drawn	% Won
Benin	1	0	1	0	0%
Burkina Faso	3	0	3	0	0%
Mali	4	1	3	0	25%
Niger	2	0	2	0	0%
Togo	1	1	0	0	100%
Total	11	2	9	0	18.18%

== See also ==
- Rugby union in Chad
