= Mauritania national rugby union team =

Mauritania
First international
- Ghana 29–8 Mauritania (Bamako, Mali; 5 October 2003)

Largest win
- Mauritania 10–5 Libya (Cairo, Egypt; 29 October 2010)

Largest defeat
- Mali 81–0 Mauritania (Dakar, Senegal; 9 June 2004)

World Cup
- Appearances: 0

The Mauritania national rugby union team represents Mauritania in international rugby union. Mauritania are a member of the International Rugby Board (IRB), and have yet to play in a Rugby World Cup tournament. The Mauritania national rugby team played their first ever international against Ghana in 2003, with Ghana winning the game 29 points to 8.

== Record ==
Below is a table of the representative rugby matches played by a Mauritania national XV at test level up until 29 October 2010, updated after the match with Libya.

| Opponent | Played | Won | Lost | Drawn | % Won |
|---|---|---|---|---|---|
| Benin | 1 | 0 | 1 | 0 | 0% |
| Burkina Faso | 1 | 0 | 1 | 0 | 0% |
| Cameroon | 1 | 0 | 1 | 0 | 0% |
| Egypt | 1 | 0 | 1 | 0 | 0% |
| Ghana | 1 | 0 | 1 | 0 | 0% |
| Libya | 1 | 1 | 0 | 0 | 100% |
| Mali | 1 | 0 | 1 | 0 | 0% |
| Senegal | 1 | 0 | 1 | 0 | 0% |
| Togo | 1 | 0 | 1 | 0 | 0% |
| Total | 9 | 1 | 8 | 0 | 11.11% |
