= 2010 Africa Cup =

Rugby union tournament

10th Africa Cup
Tournament details
- Date: 3 June 2010– 15 June 2010
- Teams: 12

Final positions

Tournament statistics
- Matches played: 8

The 2010 Africa Cup was an incomplete edition of highest level rugby union tournament in Africa. The competition was arranged expecting the participation of twelve teams that were divided into three pools. The winner of each pool was admitted to the final stage.

The tournament was not completed and the title not assigned. After that the pool B was cancelled due to the withdrawal of three of four teams participating; the final stage was not played after Morocco withdrew from hosting the final.

== Division 1 (Africa Cup) ==
=== Pools stage ===
==== Pool A ====
The pool A was regularly played in Tunisia and won by Morocco.

===== Semifinals =====
15 June 2010

Morocco	60 – 3	Ivory Coast

Tunis

15 June 2010

Tunisia	12 – 11	Senegal

Tunis

===== 3rd place final =====
19 June 2010

Senegal	21 – 6	Ivory Coast

Tunis

===== Final =====
19 June 2010

Tunisia	6 – 29	Morocco

Tunis

==== Pool B ====
The tournament was originally scheduled in Youndé, but there was the withdraw of Kenya, Namibia and Uganda.

==== Pool C ====
The tournament was played in Bulawayo, Zimbabwe and won by hosting team.

===== Semifinals =====
30 June 2010

Botswana	10 – 87	Zimbabwe

Bulawayo

30 June 2010

Madagascar	36 – 18	Zambia

Bulawayo

===== Third place final =====
3 July 2010

Botswana	14 – 27	Zambia

Bulawayo

===== Final =====
3 July 2010

Zimbabwe	28 – 22	Madagascar

Bulawayo

=== Final stage ===
The final stage was originally scheduled for beginning of November in Morocco. After an initial proposal of Madagascar federation, the tournament was cancelled.

== See also ==
- 2010 Victoria Cup
