= 2011 Rugby World Cup – Africa qualification =

International rugby union competition Africa

Tournament details
- Dates: 11 May 2008 – 28 November 2009
- No. of nations: 14

In the African Regional qualifying process, 14 of the 15 eligible IRB member nations took part. South Africa had already qualified from Rugby World Cup 2007).

The qualifying process began with playoffs in May 2008. The 2008–09 Africa Cup doubled as the qualifying tournament, with the winner being Africa's direct qualifier. The runner-up of the tournament would be entered into the four-team World Cup playoff for the 20th 2011 Rugby World Cup finalist berth.

The Cup was decided first by four pools of three teams with the pool winners qualifying for the semi-finals.

Namibia swept Tunisia in a two-legged final, qualifying for Pool D of the 2011 Rugby World Cup, while Tunisia advanced to the Final Place Playoff.

== Preliminary round ==
Two single-legged playoffs were used to cut the nations down from the 14 eligible nations to the 12 who would compete for the 2008–09 Africa Cup. Preliminary round teams were the lowest ranked teams in the north and south respectively. Nigeria and Swaziland were eliminated in this round.

=== Matches ===
11 May 2008

Cameroon	26–6	Nigeria
Try: Eba Fouda Paulin; Moaka Louis; Foke Fone Bertrand; Con: Unknown; Pen: Negalev Touko Raphael (3)	Report	Pen: Adeez Ladipo (2)

Stade Ahmadou Ahidjo, Yaoundé, Cameroon

17 May 2008

Botswana	25–7	Swaziland

Gaborone, Botswana

== Round 1: Group stage ==
Pool winners qualified for the semi-finals. Pools were determined through world rankings.

Bonus point system:

- 4 points for a win
- 2 for a draw
- 0 for a loss
- 1 point for scoring four tries in a game
- 1 point for losing by seven points or less.

=== Pool A ===
Team	Played	Won	Drawn	Lost	For	Against	Difference	TB	LB	Points
Namibia	2	2	0	0	48	31	+17	1	0	9
Senegal	1	0	0	1	10	13	-3	0	1	1
Zimbabwe	1	0	0	1	21	35	-14	0	0	0

==== Matches ====
14 June 2008

Senegal	10–13	Namibia

Stade Leopold Senghor, Dakar

Zimbabwe	Cancelled	Senegal

2 August 2008

Namibia	35–21	Zimbabwe

Hage Geingob Rugby Stadium, Windhoek

=== Pool B ===
Team	Played	Won	Drawn	Lost	For	Against	Difference	TB	LB	Points
Ivory Coast	2	2	0	0	53	18	+35	1	0	9
Morocco	2	1	0	1	38	39	-1	1	0	5
Zambia	2	0	0	2	27	61	-34	0	0	0

14 June 2008

Zambia	18–29	Morocco

Showgrounds, Lusaka

12 July 2008

Ivory Coast	32–9	Zambia

Stade Félix Houphouët-Boigny, Abidjan

2 August 2008

Morocco	9–21	Ivory Coast

COC Stadium, Casablanca

=== Pool C ===
Team	Played	Won	Drawn	Lost	For	Against	Difference	TB	LB	Points
Tunisia	2	2	0	0	60	25	+35	1	0	9
Kenya	2	1	0	1	91	52	+39	1	0	5
Cameroon	2	0	0	2	18	92	-74	0	1	1

==== Matches ====
14 June 2008

Cameroon	12–16	Tunisia

Yaoundé

12 July 2008

Kenya	76–8	Cameroon

E.A. Union Ground, Nairobi

2 August 2008

Tunisia	44–15	Kenya

Stade El Menzah, Tunis

=== Pool D ===
Team	Played	Won	Drawn	Lost	For	Against	Difference	TB	LB	Points
Uganda	2	2	0	0	59	32	+27	2	0	10
Madagascar	2	1	0	1	67	47	+20	1	0	5
Botswana	2	0	0	2	25	72	-47	0	0	0

==== Matches ====
14 June 2008

Botswana	10–27	Uganda

Gaborone

12 July 2008

Madagascar	45–15	Botswana

Stade Municipal de Mahamasina, Antananarivo

2 August 2008

Uganda	32–22	Madagascar

Kyodondo Rugby Club, Kampala

== Round 2: Semi-finals ==
14 June 2009

Ivory Coast	13–13	Namibia

Stade Félix Houphouët-Boigny, Abidjan

27 June 2009

Namibia	54–14	Ivory Coast

Hage Geingob Rugby Stadium, Windhoek

Namibia won 67–27 and progressed to Round 3.

13 June 2009

Uganda	17–41	Tunisia

Kyodondo Rugby Club, Kampala

27 June 2009

Tunisia	38–13	Uganda

Stade El Menzah, Tunis

Tunisia won 79–30 and progressed to Round 3.

== Round 3: Qualification final ==
Namibia and Tunisia competed for Africa's automatic place in the 2011 Rugby World Cup finals in New Zealand over two legs, with Namibia qualifying for their fourth consecutive world cup. Tunisia faced Romania, the third-placed team from Europe, in the semi-finals of the Play-off series.

14 November 2009

Tunisia	13–18	Namibia

Stade El Menzah, Tunis

28 November 2009

Namibia	22–10	Tunisia

Hage Geingob Rugby Stadium, Windhoek

Namibia won the series 2–0, with an aggregate score of 40–23.

== See also ==
2011 Rugby World Cup qualifying
