= Mayotte national rugby union team =

Mayotte
- Union: Comité Territorial de Rugby de Mayotte

First international
- Réunion 48–0 Mayotte (Saint Denis, Réunion; 30 May 2006)

Largest win
- Mayotte 58–0 Rwanda (Arusha, Tanzania; 28 June 2007)

Largest defeat
- Réunion 90–0 Mayotte (Curepipe, Mauritius; 5 July 2008)

The Mayotte national rugby union team represents Mayotte in the sport of rugby union. As an overseas department of France, Mayotte can participate in international competition, but not for the Rugby World Cup. Mayotte has thus far competed in the south section of the CAR Development Trophy along with African nations.

== Record ==
Below is a table of the representative rugby matches played by a Mayotte national XV at test level up until 5 July 2008, updated after the match with Réunion.

Opponent	Played	Won	Lost	Drawn	% Won
Botswana	1	1	0	0	100%
Mauritius	2	0	2	0	0%
Réunion	2	0	2	0	0%
Rwanda	1	1	0	0	100%
Tanzania	2	0	2	0	0%
Total	8	2	6	0	25%

== See also ==
- French Rugby Federation
- Comité Territorial de Rugby de Mayotte
- Rugby union in Mayotte
