= Crescent Cup =

Rugby union tournament for men's national teams

- Current season or competition: 2015 Crescent Cup
- Sport: Rugby union
- Instituted: 2015
- Number of teams: 6
- Regions: Intercontinental (World Rugby)
- Holders: Malaysia (2015)
- Most titles: Malaysia (1 title)
- Website: CrescentCupRugbyChampionship.com

The Crescent Cup, or the Islamic Nations Rugby Championship, is a men's rugby union tournament, organised by World Rugby and the Islamic Solidarity Sports Federation and featuring teams from the Muslim world. The inaugural tournament was held in Malaysia in 2015. It was co-organised with the Malaysia Rugby Union. The hosts Malaysia are the current champions, having defeated Algeria in the final.

Although the tournament has been retrospectively described as 'inaugural', as of March 2016 no further tournaments have been announced.

== Results ==
=== Tournaments ===
| Year | Host(s) | Final | | | Bronze Final | | | Number of teams |
| Year | Host(s) | Winner | Score | Runner-up | 3rd place | Score | 4th place | Number of teams |
| 2015 | Malaysia | Malaysia | 19–11 | Algeria | Kazakhstan | 35–25 | Lebanon | 5 |

=== Team records ===
| Team | Champions | Runners-up | Third | Fourth |
|---|---|---|---|---|
| Malaysia | 1 (2015) | | | |
| Algeria | | 1 (2015) | | |
| Kazakhstan | | | 1 (2015) | |
| Lebanon | | | | 1 (2015) |

=== Performance of nations ===
For each tournament, the number of teams in each finals tournament (in brackets) are shown.

| Team | 2015 (5) |
|---|---|
| Algeria | 2nd |
| Iran | • |
| Kazakhstan | 3rd |
| Lebanon | 4th |
| Malaysia | 1st |
| Uzbekistan | R1; 5th |

Legend

- 1st — Champions
- 2nd — Runners-up
- 3rd — Third place
- 4th — Fourth place
- R1 — Round 1 (pool stage)
- • — withdrew
- — Hosts
