= Algerian Rugby Federation =

National rugby federation

Algerian Rugby Federation (FAR)
- Sport: Rugby union
- Founded: 17 November 2015; 9 years ago
- World Rugby affiliation: 2021
- Rugby Africa affiliation: 2015
- President: Sofiane Abdelkader Benhassen
- Men's coach: Salim Tebani
- Website: dzrugby.com

The Algerian Rugby Federation (FAR); (Arabic: الفدرالية الجزائرية للرغبي) is the governing body for rugby union in Algeria. Algeria became a full member of Rugby Africa in December 2016. The federation is responsible for the Algerian national team and the "Algerian Rugby Championship". It is in charge of promoting the sport in Algeria, organizes international matches for the national team, and is involved in educating and training players and officials. Algeria has never participated in the Rugby World Cup qualifiers. Their best result to date was a 50–0 win against Egypt and Libya, both in a Cairo international tournament in 2010.

FAR was accepted as an affiliate member of World Rugby in 2019 and became a full member in 2021.

== History ==
During the French presence in Algeria before 1962, rugby union had its followers either in Oran, Guelma, Algiers or Annaba where clubs like Stade Oranais, RIJA, USMMC, AGVGA or ES Guelma were existent. Rugby had its moments of glory and many Algerian players have been able to achieve successful professional careers abroad, especially in France; but discipline disappeared after the independence of Algeria due to lack of multiple items till 1972 when it disappeared completely.

During the beginning of the 2000s, The Algerian Rugby Clubs Committee was established to revive the discipline before creating the federation. On 17 November 2015 the federation was created in Algiers during a constitutive general assembly chaired by Mustapha Larfaoui, honorary president of the Algerian Olympic and Sports Committee and attended by representatives of 18 clubs of 16 wilayas. Sofiane Benhassen was elected first president of the federation.

In December 2016, Benhassen reported that they would begin a national ruby championship among 20 rugby union club teams, starting in 2017.

== Crest ==
Logo (2015–17)

Logo (2017–22)

== See also ==
- Rugby union in Algeria
- Algeria national rugby union team
