= Réunion national rugby union team =

Réunion
- Union: Comité Territorial de Rugby de la Réunion

First international
- Réunion 3–16 Mauritius (1966)

Largest win
- Réunion 90–0 Mayotte (Curepipe, Mauritius; 5 July 2008)

Largest defeat
- France A 73–7 Réunion (21 June 2014)

The Réunion national rugby union team represents Réunion in the sport of rugby union. As an overseas department of France, Réunion can participate in international competition, but not for the Rugby World Cup. Réunion has thus far competed in the south section of the CAR Development Trophy along with African nations.

== Record ==
Below is a table of the representative rugby matches played by a Réunion national XV at test level up until 2 November 2025, updated after the match with Mauritius.

Opponent	Played	Won	Lost	Drawn	% Won
Botswana	3	2	1	0	66.67%
Eswatini	1	1	0	0	100%
France A	1	0	1	0	0%
Madagascar	5	1	4	0	20%
Mauritius	19	10	9	0	52.63%
Mayotte	2	2	0	0	100%
Tanzania	2	1	1	0	50%
Total	33	17	16	0	51.52%

== See also ==
- French Rugby Federation
- Comité Territorial de Rugby de la Réunion
- Rugby union in Réunion
