= Bamburi Rugby Super Series =

East African rugby union competition

- Sport: Rugby union
- Instituted: 2003
- Number of teams: 8
- Country: Kenya (5 teams); Uganda (2 teams); Tanzania (1 team)
- Holders: (Kenya) Rhinos (2010)
- Most titles: (Kenya) Rhinos (4)
- Broadcast partner: (South Africa) Supersport
- Related competition: Kenya Cup

The Bamburi Super Series was an East African Rugby union competition with eight teams in total, five teams from Kenya (Lions, Rhinos, Sharks, Cheetahs and Buffaloes) two from Uganda (Rwenzori and Victoria) and one from Tanzania (Twigas) that is currently defunct. It is closely based on the Super Rugby competition in the southern hemisphere. Games take place at the RFUEA Ground in Nairobi (Kenya), Friedkin Recreation Centre in Arusha (Tanzania) and the Kyadondo Grounds, Kampala (Uganda). Rhinos have won the most titles with four wins, and are the only team to have defended a title when they beat the Cheetahs 25–5 in the 2010 final.

== Scoring system ==
The current scoring system per match is listed below.

Win by four or more tries	Win by less than four tries	Draw	Loss by less than seven points	Loss by more than seven points	Failure to honour fixture
5	4	2	1	0	-2

== Teams ==
The teams consists of players drawn from two or three club teams. Trials are held by each franchise from which the best 30 players are picked to represent the team in the tournament. This combination of players from many clubs allows for a higher quality of rugby to be played.

There are eight teams in total:

- From Kenya
  - Buffaloes draw players from all the clubs from Nyanza and Western Provinces.
  - Cheetahs are made up of players from Impala RFC and Nondescripts RFC.
  - Lions are made up of Kenya Commercial Bank RFC, Mwamba RFC and Mombasa Sports Club.
  - Rhinos include players from Kenya Harlequin and Nakuru RFC.
  - Sharks made up of Mean Machine RFC, Strathmore University RFC and Mombasa Polytechnic RFC.
- From Uganda
  - Rwenzori are named after the mountain range in the west of Uganda draws its players from Kampala Kobs RFC, Pirates RFC, Rhinos RFC and Nile RFC.
  - Victoria are named after the lake on the eastern border of Uganda consists of players drawn from Heathens RFC, Buffaloes RFC, Entebbe Mongers RFC and Hima Impis RFC.
- From Tanzania
  - Twigas take their name from the Swahili word for giraffe and their players come from any club within Tanzania.

In the first few years of the tournament, the clubs that made up the various franchises would change from year to year in an effort to maintain a balanced competition. Since 2008 the emphasis has been on retaining more stability in order to allow for the development of fan loyalty and stronger spectator support from year to year.

== History ==
=== Original Structure ===
The original aim of the competition was to encourage the development of rugby in Kenya and to provide a proving ground for players at a level higher than club rugby and thus help the selectors of the Kenya XV's squad do their job. It was also hoped that it would give the 15-a-side code of the game more exposure in Kenya; after the recent successes of the national sevens team, the Kenyan public are very aware and supportive of the shorter form of the game, but somewhat ignorant of the original sport. Four franchise teams (Rhinos, Buffaloes, Lions and Cheetahs) were created within Kenya and all the matches were played at the RFUEA Ground in Nairobi. The tournament was played on a round-robin format and the top two teams qualified for the final.

=== Expansion and Development ===
In 2007, plans were made to expand the tournament beyond four teams for the first time. It was hoped that a Tanzanian and two Ugandan teams would be able to be included and that some matches could be played in Mombasa, Arusha and Kampala. Unfortunately these plans did not come to fruition. However, 2007 was the first year that games were played outside of the Kenyan capital, it was decided to move two matches to Nakuru as part of the development of the sport in the grass root level. Three teams were based in Nairobi while the other team was based in Kisumu.

In 2008 the competition was expanded to six teams with the inclusion of the Twigas from Tanzania and a new Kenya franchise, the Sharks. The Twigas franchise drew players from all the clubs within Tanzania.

In 2009, two Ugandan teams, the Victoria and the Rwenzori franchises, joined the competition. Rwenzori had been selected as the senior national team so that the series could serve as a warm-up for the RWC qualifiers in June while Victoria was mainly a development side of youngsters trying to break into the national team. The 4-week tournament was staged in Nairobi, Nakuru and Kisumu (Kenya), Kampala (Uganda) and Arusha (Tanzania). In keeping with objectives of the tournament to develop rugby at all levels, Mini, Schools and Women's competitions were incorporated into the events.

In 2010, the number of teams increased to eight with the overdue inclusion of the Tanzanian Twigas. The 2009 finalists, the Buffaloes, shifted their home base from Nakuru to Mumias in Western Kenya. The teams were drawn into two groups. Group A consisted of Cheetahs, Lions, Sharks and Twigas, Group B included Rhinos, Buffaloes, Rwenzori and Victoria.

There has also been talk of building on the success of the Victoria Cup, which has successfully brought Kenya, Uganda and Zimbabwe together in international competition, and expanding the Super Series to include one or more franchises from Zimbabwe.

=== Sponsorship and Finances ===
The first Rugby Super Series in 2003 was sponsored by Unga Group Limited, a Kenyan flour milling company whose flagship maize flour product is "Jogoo". Maize meal is the staple food of East Africa when made into ugali (also called sima or posho). Jogoo is the Swahili word for cockerel, and the 2003 tournament was called the Jogoo Rugby Super Series. The year after that the tournament title sponsor was UAP Insurance of Uganda. It wasn't until the completion of the third year of the series that Bamburi Cement agreed to sponsor the competition; it has remained the title sponsor ever since.

In 2007, the KRFU received KSh.5 million for the title sponsorship deal from the cement firm Bamburi. In 2009, this had risen to KSh.9 million. Additionally, KSh.2.5 million were given by the Kenya Bureau of Standards to be used to support the referees' programs run by KRFU for the whole year starting with the Rugby Super Series tournament.

In 2010 the Bamburi commitment was increased to KSh.11 million (5.5 million/= for publicity, 2.5 million to run the tournament, 2 million/= for the players' kits and 1 million to the prize kitty) and previous title sponsors UAP Insurance returned to inject KSh.500,000. In addition, Maxam Ltd (a Kenyan beer distributor) agreed to significantly increase their contribution from last year to KSh.850,000 thus giving them the status of Associate sponsor and Heineken beer has become the official beer for the tournament.

== Champions ==
Year	Winner	Name and Sponsor	Notes
2003	Rhinos	Jogoo Super Series, Unga Group Ltd	
2004	Cheetahs	UAP Super Series, UAP Insurance Company Uganda Ltd	
2005	Buffaloes	Bamburi Rugby Super Series, Bamburi Cement	
2006	Cheetahs	Bamburi Rugby Super Series, Bamburi Cement	
2007	Rhinos	Bamburi Rugby Super Series, Bamburi Cement	
2008	Lions	Bamburi Rugby Super Series, Bamburi Cement	
2009	Rhinos	Bamburi Rugby Super Series, Bamburi Cement	
2010	Rhinos	Bamburi Rugby Super Series, Bamburi Cement	
2011	Rhinos	Bamburi Rugby Super Series, Bamburi Cement	

== Competition details ==
=== 2006 ===
2006, first matches on 11 March, finals held on 1 April.

=== 2007 ===
Played between 3 March and 31 March. Round two, Cheetahs defeated Lions 16-0 while Rhinos beat Buffaloes 32–20. Round three played in Nakuru, reigning champions Cheetahs played Rhinos while Lions faced Buffaloes later the same day.

=== 2008 ===
On Saturday 5 April, the finals were held at RFUEA Ground, the plate final was the Cheetahs against the Sharks at 2:00pm followed by the Lions versus Rhinos at 4:00pm in the final.

=== 2009 ===
Semi finals, Buffaloes (captained by Vincent Mose) beat Sharks in the semi-final 21-11 and the Rhinos beat Rwenzori 30–20. Final held on Saturday 18 April, the Rhinos Defeated the Buffaloes 30–13 at the RFUEA Ground in Nairobi. Uganda's Rwenzori took third place after beating the Sharks of Kenya 22–19. Uganda's Rwenzori finished third and bagged a KSh.3 million/= cash prize.

=== 2010 ===
In 2010 the Super Series attracted eight teams and group matches were played in Nairobi and Nakuru (Kenya), Arusha (Tanzania) and Kampala (Uganda). The first matches were played on Saturday 24 April. In Nairobi, the Cheetahs beat the Lions 7–52 in the so-called cat fight and then the Rhinos beat the Buffaloes 61–0. At Arusha, the Twigas lost 3–79 to the Sharks and in Kampala Rwenzori lost 13–16 to Victoria.

- Week 2, Saturday 1 May
  - Pool A, Lions 20 – Sharks 12, Cheetahs 57 – Twigas 0
  - Pool B, Victoria 26 – Buffaloes 3, Rwenzori 22 – Rhinos 23
- Week 3, Saturday 8 May
  - Pool A, Lions 49 – Twigas 8, Cheetahs 30 – Sharks 20
  - Pool B, Victoria 3 – Rhinos 33, Rwenzori 28 – Buffaloes 0 (Played at Kampala, this match was preceded by a women's international friendly between Kenya and Uganda)

On Tuesday 11 May, Joshua 'Tariq' Gathumbi, (Mang'u High School, Strathmore University RFC, Impala RFC, Sharks and former national Sevens squad member) collapsed and died. His last contribution to Kenyan rugby was a stunning try in his side's 20–30 loss to the Cheetahs just three days prior to his death. Impala RFC has retired his favourite number 25 shirt.

- Semi-finals, Saturday 15 May,
  - Pool A winners Cheetahs played Pool B runners up Victoria. Cheetahs 20, Victoria 3
  - Pool B winners Lions, played Pool A runners-up Rhinos. Rhinos 17, Lions 5
- Finals, Saturday 22 May.
  - Curtain-raiser; Women's International friendly: Kenya 8 Uganda 0
  - Third-place playoff, Lions (Kenya) finished 3rd beating Victoria (Uganda) 37–0.
  - Final, Rhinos (Kenya) defended the Cheetahs (Kenya) 25–5.
    - Most Valuable Player: Sydney Ashioya (Rhinos)
    - Try Top Scorer: Robert Sseguya (Uganda)
- Cash prizes:
  - Rhinos KSh.8.4 million/=
  - Cheetahs KSh.5 million/=
  - Victoria KSh.2.5 million/=
  - Rwenzori KSh.1.5 million/=

=== 2011 ===
In 2011 Super Series was contested as follows:

- Pool matches, Saturday 30 April, Saturday 7 May and Saturday 14 May
  - Pool A,
  - Pool B,
- Semi finals, Saturday 21 May
- Final, Saturday 4 June. Rhinos (Kenya) defeated the Cheetahs (Kenya) 20-15 after extra time. The game was tied 15-15 after 80 minutes.

== See also ==
East Africa rugby union team
