= Homeboyz RFC =

Kenyan rugby union club in Nairobi, Kenya

Homeboyz
- Full name: Homeboyz Rugby Football Club
- Union: Kenya Rugby Football Union
- Nickname(s): HBR, The Boyz Are In Town, The Girlz Are In Town
- Founded: 2009
- Location: Nairobi, Kenya
- Ground(s): Jamhuri Park, Homeboyz Rugby Stadium (Capacity: 10,000)
- Chairman: (Kenya) Myke Rabar
- Coach: (Kenya) Simon Odongo
- Captain: (Kenya) Roy Wesonga (Kenya) Zeden Marrow
- League(s): Kenya Cup, Eric Shirley Shield
- 2020: Kenya Cup; 3rd (overall) (season abandoned); Eric Shirley Shield; 4th (overall) (season abandoned)
1st kit	2nd kit

Official website
- www.homeboyzrugby.co.ke

Homeboyz Rugby Football Club is a rugby union club based in Nairobi, Kenya, that competes in the Kenya Cup, Eric Shirley Shield, Enterprise Cup and Mwamba Cup. Formed in 2009, Homeboyz also has a women's team that competes in the Kenya Rugby Football Union women's league every year. Both the men's and women's teams also compete in the Kenya National Sevens Circuit that happens annually. Their main home ground is Jamhuri Park.

== History ==
=== Foundation and early years ===
Homeboyz was officially founded in 2009. This was a result of the perceived need in the market to accommodate the younger players who felt that they were not being given enough opportunities to play competitive rugby. As a start-up team in 2009, Homeboyz RFC was initially placed in the lower-tier Eric Shirley Shield. After winning the Eric Shirley Shield two seasons in a row, they earned their promotion to Kenya Cup.

The women's team was formed in 2016 after Homeboyz decided to give women a platform to showcase their talent. The women's game is still relatively young but has made great strides in the past years. The team has been consistent in the Kenya Rugby Football Union women's league and produced five women who represented the country in the 2016 Summer Olympics.

=== Tours ===
==== Against Uganda Select ====
Homeboyz first toured Uganda in 2018 having won the Enterprise Cup to face a Ugandan Select side as an initiative to promote rugby in the region. They won the match 18 - 10 with Bush Mwale and Roy Wesonga scoring a try each and Kelvin Masai kicking over two penalties and a conversion.

==== Dubai 7s ====
Homeboyz first toured Dubai in 2010 to play in the Dubai 7's Men's Invitational Tournament. This was after taking part in three of the five legs of the National Sevens Circuit and winning over many fans.

In 2018, Homeboyz won three legs of the National Sevens Circuit which saw them crowned 7's champions that season. This was rewarded by a trip to the Dubai 7's Men's Invitational Tournament once again where the side narrowly lost to the Emerging Boks.

=== Club success (2009–2019) ===
In 2009, Homeboyz had a stint in the National Sevens Circuit playing in three of the five tournaments of the circuit. Homeboyz RFC played the Prinsloo Sevens (Nakuru), Driftwoods Sevens (Mombasa) and in the Kabeberi Sevens (Nairobi) where they won their first trophy in the shield category.

In 2010, Homeboyz Rugby participated in their first 15's fixture playing in the Eric Shirley Shield, which they won in their inaugural year. Homeboyz were crowned champions after a win against Kisumu RFC at the University of Nairobi grounds. They were not promoted to play in the Kenya Cup due to some technicalities.

In 2011, the team went ahead and defended the Eric Shirley Shield trophy to secure a chance to play in the highest league in the country, Kenya Cup. The same year also saw Homeboyz win the Mwamba Cup.

In 2013, Homeboyz Rugby finished 4th in the National Sevens Circuit winning their first sevens main cup trophy, the Kabeberi 7s.

In 2014, Homeboyz missed the Kenya Cup playoff place by a single point. That same year they bagged their second sevens main cup trophy by lifting the Driftwood 7's and finishing second overall in the National Sevens Circuit.

In the 2015 Enterprise Cup, the team reaches its first senior final in the Enterprise Cup losing 28 - 0 to KCB.

In 2016, Homeboyz Rugby won the overall National Sevens Circuit, setting a record for playing in all the finals in a six leg format and winning three of them, Prinsloo 7's, Dala 7's and Nanyuki 7's.

In 2017, Homeboyz RFC finished third overall in the National Sevens Circuit having won the Driftwood 7's and Dala 7's in the process. That same year saw them reach the Kenya Cup semi-finals for the first time after finishing the regular season in position one. Homeboyz RFC drew an average home attendance of 205 in the 2017 season.

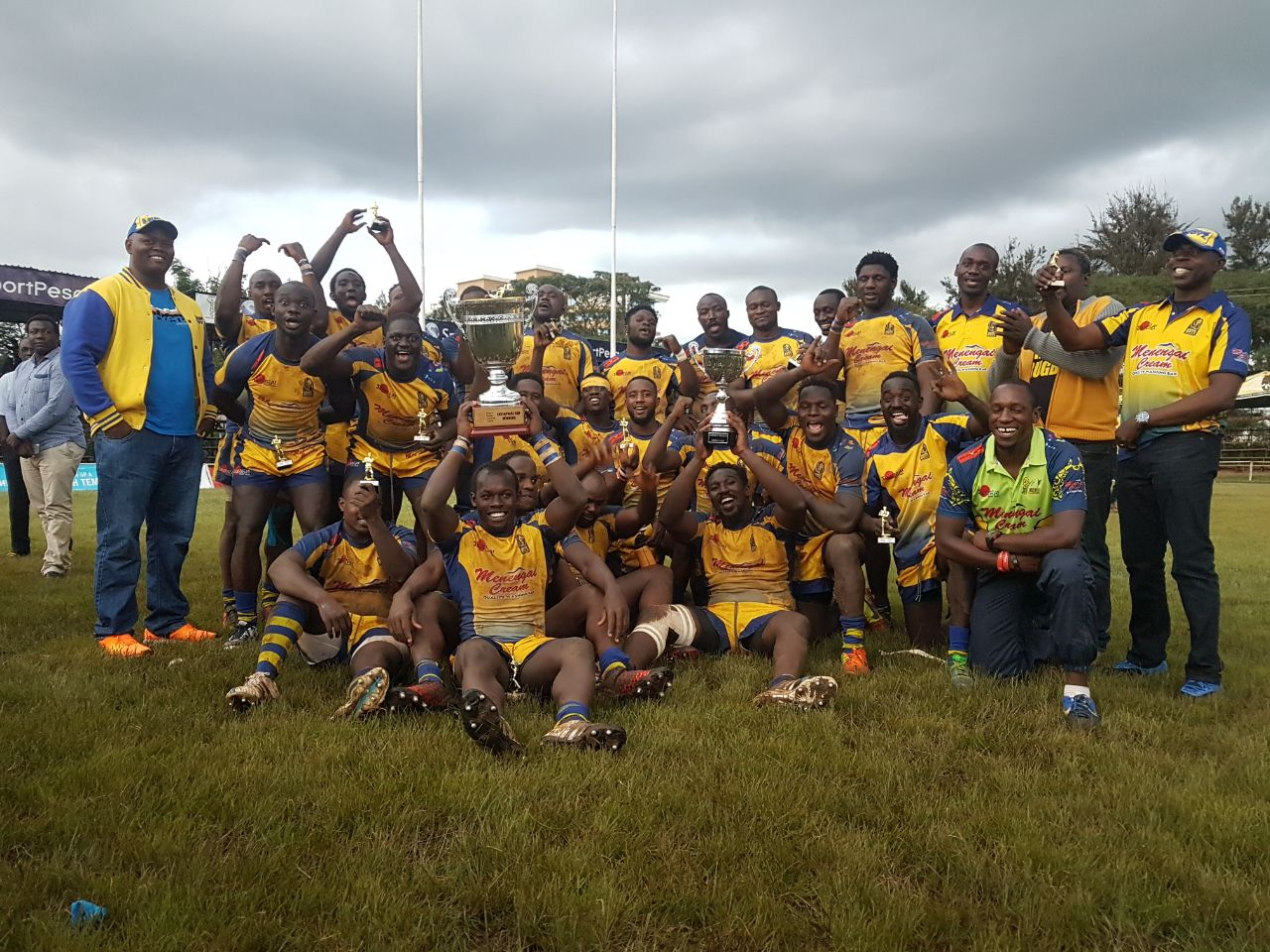
Homeboyz Rugby celebrate winning the Enterprise Cup.

In 2018, they won the Enterprise Cup, beating Impala Saracens 21 - 3 at the RFUEA Ground. That same year saw Homeboyz reclaim the overall National Sevens Circuit, winning four, Prinsloo 7's, Sepetuka 7's, Kabeberi 7's and Christie 7's, of the six legs on offer. They also had a decent run in the Kenya Cup, finishing second in the regular season before falling to Kabras 29 - 13 in the semi-final.

== Current standings ==
=== Kenya Cup ===
2019–20 Kenya Cup table
Alpha
	Team	P	W	D	L	PF	PA	PD	TBP	PTS
1	(Kenya) Kabras	16	15	0	1	677	132	+545	14	74
2	(Kenya) KCB	16	14	1	1	573	213	+360	14	71
3	(Kenya) Homeboyz	16	13	1	2	524	232	+292	12	66
4	(Kenya) Impala	16	9	0	7	406	307	+99	12	48
5	(Kenya) Mwamba	16	9	0	7	389	391	-2	7	43
6	(Kenya) Menengai Oilers	16	8	0	8	412	382	+30	9	41
7	(Kenya) Nakuru	16	8	0	8	323	393	-70	6	38
8	(Kenya) Blak Blad	16	5	0	11	326	453	-127	8	28
9	(Kenya) Harlequin	16	5	0	11	283	414	-131	7	27
10	(Kenya) Nondescripts	16	5	0	11	316	444	-128	6	26
11	(Kenya) Western Bulls	16	3	0	13	188	509	-321	-1	11
12	(Kenya) Kisumu	16	1	0	15	173	738	-565	-2	2

=== Eric Shirley Shield ===
2019–20 Eric Shirley Shield table
Bravo
	Team	P	W	D	L	PF	PA	PD	TBP	PTS
1	(Kenya) KCB	16	14	1	1	638	163	+475	14	72
2	(Kenya) Kabras	16	14	1	1	576	103	+473	14	72
3	(Kenya) Menengai Oilers	16	13	0	3	471	259	+212	13	65
4	(Kenya) Homeboyz	16	11	1	4	390	225	+165	8	54
5	(Kenya) Impala	16	10	1	5	458	202	+256	10	52
6	(Kenya) Mwamba	16	8	1	7	370	298	+72	10	44
7	(Kenya) Nakuru	16	9	0	7	317	336	-19	8	44
8	(Kenya) Blak Blad	16	5	0	11	186	572	-386	4	24
9	(Kenya) Harlequin	16	4	1	11	232	407	-175	4	22
10	(Kenya) Nondescripts	16	3	0	13	161	391	-230	6	18
11	(Kenya) Western Bulls	16	2	0	14	102	403	-301	-13	-5
12	(Kenya) Kisumu	16	0	0	16	58	600	-542	-5	-5

=== 2020 Enterprise Cup ===
Round of 16
1	Kabras RFC	47
2	Menengai Oilers	19
3	Mwamba RFC	28
4	Kisumu RFC	0
5	Harlequin	13
6	Homeboyz	39
7	Nondescripts	28
8	Masinde Muliro	0
9	Impala Saracens	41
10	Mean Machine	22
11	Nakuru	28
12	Mombasa	0
13	KCB	27
14	Strathmore	3
15	Blak Blad	28
16	Western Bulls	0

Quarterfinals
1	Kabras	54
2	Mwamba	10
3	Homeboyz	33
4	Nondescripts	11
5	Impala Saracens	39
6	Nakuru	21
7	KCB	43
8	Blak Blad	12

Semifinals
Kabras
Homeboyz
Impala Saracens
KCB

Finals

=== 2020 Mwamba Cup ===
Round of 16
1	Kabras RFC	28
2	Northern Suburbs	0
3	Mwamba RFC	48
4	Daystar Falcons	24
5	Nakuru	28
6	CUEA Monks	0
7	Impala Saracens	36
8	Swara	16
9	Strathmore	22
10	Nondescripts	13
11	Harlequin	13
12	Shamas Foundation	18
13	Homeboyz	17
14	Menengai Oilers	27
15	KCB	27
16	Strathmore	3

Quarterfinals

Semifinals

Finals

== Colours and crest ==
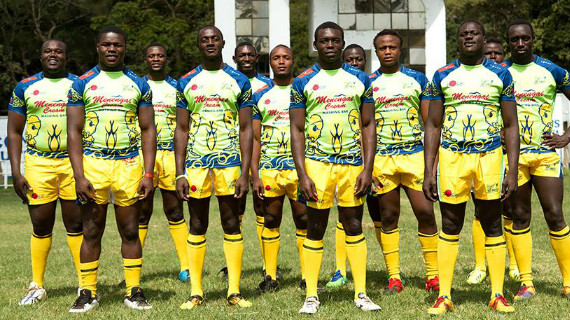
The Menengai Cream kit

The blue and yellow that are famous with the club is adopted from the club sponsor, Homeboyz Entertainment Limited. The current crest was remodeled in November 2015 and retained the Homeboyz logo and the blue and yellow colors.

The current kit is made by Samurai Sportswear. Homeboyz Entertainment was the primary kit sponsor from 2009 to 2015 with its brands H^{2}O and HBR 103.5 FM featuring in front of their jersey. In the 2015/16 season, Menengai Cream took over as the primary kit sponsor featuring in front of the jersey until the 2018/19 season.

== Squad ==
=== Coaching and management staff ===
Position	Name	Nationality
Backs and skills coach	Simon Odongo	Kenya
Forwards coach	Elisha Okello	Kenya
Strength & conditioning coach	Michael Mulugu	Kenya
Assistant team manager	Edward Wekesa	Kenya
Logistics manager	Spencer Githinji	Kenya
Lead physiotherapist	Samuel Ochieng	Kenya

=== Current squad ===
Homeboyz Rugby's current squad
**Props**: (Kenya) **Thomas Okidia**; (Kenya) Abel Matanda; (Kenya) **Meshack Akenga**; (Kenya) **Elfas Etemesi**; (Kenya) **Joseph Amalemba**; (Kenya) **John Gichuhi**; **Hookers**: (Kenya) **Aaron Khalechi**; (Kenya) Bruce Shiemi; (Kenya) Uyn Omaya; **Locks**: (Kenya) Polycap Odhiambo; (Kenya) Wallace Onyango; (Kenya) **Emmanuel Silungi**; (Kenya) **Roy Wesonga** c; (Kenya) Malcom Oketch; (Kenya) Douglas Opani	**Back row**: (Kenya) **Stanley Isogol**; (Kenya) Levis Ochieng; (Kenya) **Reinhard Ngaira**; (Kenya) Paul Akatch; (Kenya) Elijah Nganga; (Kenya) Philbert Mwanzo; (Kenya) Brian Kitiva; (Kenya) **Keith Wasike**; **Scrum-halves**: (Kenya) **Mohammed Omollo**; (Kenya) **Lugonzo Ligamy**; (Kenya) Michael Nyakundi; **Fly-halves**: (Kenya) **Henry Ayah**; (Kenya) **Arnold Onzere**; (Kenya) **Kelvin Masai**	**Centres**: (Kenya) **Maxwell Kangeri**; (Kenya) Bob Muhati; (Kenya) Jan Remke; (Kenya) **Jeffrey Oluoch**; (Kenya) **Zeden Marrow** c; (Kenya) **Nelson Sangurah**; **Wingers**: (Kenya) **Leonard Mugaisi**; (Kenya) **Alvin Otieno**; (Kenya) **Bush Mwale**; (Kenya) **Collins Shikoli**; (Kenya) Victor Odhiambo; (Kenya) Bryan Juma; **Fullbacks**: (Kenya) **Michael Wanjala**; (Kenya) Brian Ayimba; (Kenya) **Amon Wamalwa**
(c) denotes the team captain, **Bold** denotes players who have represented the national Under 20, 7's or 15's team.

=== Academy squad ===
Homeboyz Rugby's Academy Squad
**Props**: (Kenya) Albert Kinyanjui; (Kenya) Hector Muindi; (Kenya) Kennedy Mutuku; (Kenya) Kisise Okeyo; **Hookers**: (Kenya) Bevon Mutuma; (Kenya) Mike Munene; **Locks**: (Kenya) Patrick Mwakina; (Kenya) Eric Bwayo; (Kenya) Felix Ouma	**Back row**: (Kenya) Jesse Mugonyi; (Kenya) Isaac Akali; (Kenya) Charles Omulakho; **Scrum-halves**: (Kenya) Simon Gathii; (Kenya) Emmanuel Osundwa; **Fly-halves**: (Kenya) Eric Ogutu	**Centres**: (Kenya) Alvin Wanjala; (Kenya) Joseph Kilozo; (Kenya) George Mogusu; **Wingers**: (Kenya) **Victor Shigoli**; (Kenya) Tom Ojango; (Kenya) Kelvin Agwambo; (Kenya) **John Ochar**; (Kenya) Pius Odera; **Fullbacks**: (Kenya) Solomon Maleu
(c) denotes the team captain, **Bold** denotes players who have represented the national Under 20, 7's or 15's team

=== Women's squad ===
Homeboyz Rugby Women's Squad
**Props**: (Kenya) **Millicent Opalla**; (Kenya) **Mercy Migongo**; **Hookers**: (Kenya) Peris Kagendo; **Locks**: (Kenya) Namariq Musa; (Kenya) **Enid Ouma**; (Kenya) **Emmaculate Awuor**	**Back row**: (Kenya) **Sophie Aiyeta**; (Kenya) **Janet Awuor Awino**; (Kenya) **Leah Njogu**; (Kenya) Sheila Atanyi; (Kenya) Shariffa Chiringa; **Scrum-halves**: (Kenya) Naomi Asungu; (Kenya) **Irene Awino Otieno**; (Kenya) Eunice Momanyi; **Fly-halves**: (Kenya) Dorcas Sinaida	**Centres**: (Kenya) **Sheila Kavugwe Chajira** c; (Kenya) **Cynthia Camilla**; **Wingers**: (Kenya) Veronica Oile; (Kenya) Edith Sally; (Kenya) **Linet Arasa**; (Kenya) Salome Mwelu; (Kenya) Valentine Akinyi; (Kenya) Joy Mitchell; **Fullbacks**: (Kenya) Amollo Ong'ombe
(c) denotes the team captain, **Bold** denotes players who have represented the national Lionesses team either at 7's, 15's or both

== Coaches ==
Homeboyz were coached in their first season by Eric Situma, who was assisted by Paul Murunga. Situma was replaced by Murunga in 2011 who had several assistants that included Benjamin Ayimba, Bill Githinji, and former Homeboyz players Elisha Okello and Simon Odongo. Murunga continued as coach until he was appointed Kenya Sevens coach after the 2017 season. Simon Odongo took over the reins for the 2018 season and didn't have an assistant during that time. In 2019, Sharks Academy coach, Jason Hector, was announced as the Homeboyz head coach. Jason was assisted by Simon Odongo in the season that was canceled owing to the COVID-19 pandemic. Jason was appointed head coach of the Western Province Rugby Academy Claremont Campus for the 2021 season.

Current coaches

- Simon Odongo (Backs)
- Elisha Okello (Forwards)

== Former coaches ==
Coach	Season(s)
(Kenya) Eric Situma	2009/10 – 2010/11
(Kenya) Paul Murunga	2011/12 - 2016/17
(Kenya) Simon Odongo	2017/18 – 2018/19
(South Africa) Jason Hector	2019/20 – 2020

== Notable players ==
=== Olympians ===
The following Homeboyz players represented Kenya at the 2020 Summer Olympics:

- Alvin Otieno
- Jeff Oluoch
- Sheila Kavugwe Chajira
- Cynthia Atieno
- Leah Wambui

The following Homeboyz players represented Kenya at the 2016 Summer Olympics:

- Oscar Ayodi
- Bush Mwale
- Lugonzo Ligamy
- Sheila Kavugwe Chajira
- Janet Awuor Awino
- Irene Awino Otieno
- Linet Arasa
- Rachael Adhiambo Mbogo

=== Singapore Sevens winners ===
The following Homeboyz players were part of the team that won the 2016 Singapore Sevens:

- Oscar Ayodi
- Alvin Otieno
- Lugonzo Ligamy

=== Rugby World Cup Sevens ===
The following Homeboyz players have represented Kenya at the Rugby World Cup Sevens:

- Michael Wanjala (2013)
- Oscar Ayodi (2018)
- Jeff Oluoch (2018)

=== Commonwealth Games ===
The following Homeboyz players have represented Kenya at the Commonwealth Games:

- Michael Wanjala (2014)
- Oscar Ayodi (2018)
- Jeff Oluoch (2018)

=== Youth Olympians ===
The following Homeboyz players were part of the Kenya Under 19 team that took part in the 2014 Summer Youth Olympics:

- Brian Songoi
- Nelson Sangura
- Brian Gisemba
- John Ochar
- Keith Wasike
- Daniel Abuonji
- Lamech Kimutai
- Ian Omondi

=== Overseas players ===
Note: Flags indicate national union as has been defined under World Rugby eligibility rules.

- (Uganda) Solomon Okia: 2014–2016
- (Uganda) Eliphaz Emong: 2019–2020
