= 2014 Enterprise Cup =

- Countries: Kenya
- Tournament format(s): Knockout
- Champions: Nakuru RFC (7th title)
- Matches played: 11

The 2014 Enterprise Cup was the 76th time that the Enterprise Cup has been contested.

== Fixtures and results ==
Wild-Card; 8 March 2014
Kenya Harlequin F.C.	44
Western Bulls RFC	20
Mombasa S.C.	5
Impala R.F.C.	24
Blak Blad RFC	13
Homeboyz RFC	35
Strathmore Leos	32
Mean Machine RFC	10

Quarterfinals; 15 March 2014
K.C.B.	36
Kenya Harlequin F.C.	6
Mwamba RFC	16
Impala R.F.C.	18
Nakuru RFC	35
Homeboyz RFC	10
Nondescripts RFC	23
Strathmore Leos	18

Semifinals; 21–29 March 2014
K.C.B.	31
Impala R.F.C.	14
Nakuru RFC	38
Nondescripts RFC	10

Final; 05 April 2014
K.C.B.	13
Nakuru RFC	18
