= 2013 Enterprise Cup =

- Countries: Kenya
- Tournament format(s): Knockout
- Champions: Mwamba RFC (4th title)
- Matches played: 11

The 2013 Enterprise Cup was the 75th time that the Enterprise Cup has been contested.

== Fixtures and results ==
Wild-Card; 2 March 2013
Kenya Harlequin F.C.	74
Western Bulls RFC	18
Homeboyz RFC	14
Kisumu RFC	0
Nondescripts RFC	36
Mean Machine RFC	11
Impala R.F.C.	39
Blak Blad RFC	5

Quarterfinals; 16 March 2013
Nakuru RFC	21
Kenya Harlequin F.C.	5
K.C.B.	26
Homeboyz RFC	15
Strathmore Leos	18
Nondescripts RFC	23
Mwamba RFC	65
Impala R.F.C.	19

Semifinals; 23 March 2013
Nakuru RFC	21
K.C.B.	9
Nondescripts RFC	25
Mwamba RFC	35

Final; 06 April 2013
Nakuru RFC	10
Mwamba RFC	15
