= Kenya National Sevens Circuit =

- Current season, competition or edition: 2019 Kenya National Sevens Circuit
- Kenya National Sevens Circuit
- Sport: Rugby union
- Founded: 1998
- First season: 1999
- Country: Kenya
- Most recent champion: Kenya Commercial Bank RFC 2014
- Sponsor: Western Union

First played in 1999, the Kenya National Sevens Circuit is an annual series of rugby sevens tournaments run by the Kenya Rugby Union in conjunction with host clubs featuring teams from across the country. Teams compete for the National Sevens Circuit title by accumulating points based on their finishing position in each tournament. The season’s circuit currently comprises 6 tournaments in 6 cities and towns across Kenya.

After a two-year hiatus due to the COVID-19 pandemic, the National Sevens Circuit resumed in May 2022.

== 2019 National Sevens Circuit Dates ==
20/21 July – Kakamega Sevens, Bull Ring Kakamega

27/28 July – Kabeberi Sevens, RFUEA Ground, Nairobi

3/4 August – BREAK

10/11 August – Dala Sevens, Mamboleo Showground, Kisumu

17/18 August – Prinsloo Sevens, Nakuru Athletic Club, Nakuru

24/25 August – BREAK

31 August/1 September – Christie Sevens, RFUEA Ground, Nairobi

7/8 September – Driftwood Sevens, Mombasa Sports Club, Mombasa

	Christie Sevens	Dala Sevens	Driftwood Sevens	Kabeberi Sevens	Prinsloo Sevens
Hosts	Kenya Harlequin F.C.	Kisumu RFC	Mombasa RFC	Mwamba RFC	Nakuru RFC
Venue	RFUEA Ground; Nairobi	Kisumu Polytechnic; Kisumu	Mombasa Sports Club; Mombasa	RFUEA Ground; Nairobi	Nakuru Athletic Club; Nakuru
Notes	The tournament is named after former Kenya Harlequin Chairman, Alex Christie (also Vice President of Wasps FC in London and President of the RFUEA) and is regarded as the longest running sevens tournament in Kenya, having been played every year since 1962.	Kisumu is regarded by many Kenyans as home because many people in Nairobi either left Kisumu to find work in the capital or are descended from people who did. Dala means home in the Luo language that is spoken on the eastern shores of Lake Victoria.	The Driftwood Beach Club, Malindi, donated the trophy (appropriately, a piece of driftwood shaped by the winds, waves and currents of the Indian Ocean) and asked that their sevens tournament from the early 1970s be revived.	Named for of former Mwamba player George Mwangi Kabeberi who died in 1986.	Named after Peter Walter Prinsloo, a rugby player from South Africa who - after moving to Nakuru - reignited interest in the game in the Rift Valley during the 1980s.
2009	21–22 November	14–15 November	12–13 December	5–6 December	28–29 November
2010	14–15 November	4–5 September	25–26 September	18–19 September	27–28 August
2011	10–11 September	27–28 August	1–2 October	24–25 September	3–4 September
2012	11–12 August	18–19 August	15–16 September	8–9 September	1–2 September
2013	7–8 September	3–4 August	24–25 August	10–11 August	31 August–1 September
2014	6–7 September	9–10 August	23–24 August	2–3 August	30–31 August
2015	1–2 August	8–9 August	22–23 August	5–6 September	29–30 August

== History of seven-a-side rugby in East Africa ==
=== RAF Sevens ===
RAF Sevens Winners
Year	Winners
1937	Nondescripts RFC
1938	Nondescripts RFC
1939	Nondescripts RFC
1940-46	No tournaments during World War II
1947	Nondescripts RFC
1948	Nondescripts RFC
1949	Ruiru RFC (Ruiru)
1950	Nondescripts RFC
1951	Nondescripts RFC
1952	Mombasa RFC
1953	Mombasa RFC
1954	Nondescripts RFC
1955	Londiani RFC (Londiani)
1956	Kenya Harlequin F.C.
1957	Kenya Police RFC
1958	Nakuru RFC
1959	1st Battalion, The Cameronians
1960	Impala RFC
1961	
1962	
1963	

The first seven-a-side competition in Kenya was the 1937 RAF Sevens. The cup for this annual competition was presented by 223 Squadron, Royal Air Force and the competition was open to all clubs in East Africa (i.e. within Kenya Colony, Uganda Protectorate and Tanganyika Territory) and any other combination of players who wished to enter a team. The tournament was usually played over the August Bank Holiday weekend and was a very popular addition to the Kenya rugby and Nairobi social calendars.

Incidentally 223 Squadron (The squadron was based at RAF Eastleigh - now Moi Air Base - Nairobi) were the first RAF squadron to field a rugby team in East Africa, though they were far from the first military team as Royal Navy vessels had been playing against the colonists since, at the latest, 1922. The "Royal Air Force (Kenya) RFC" first fielded a team in 1937 captained by a Corporal Clarke with Pilot Officer Roden as vice-captain and the team owed a lot to the behind-the-scenes work of Squadron Leader Pitcairn-Hill. In about 1955 the team changed its name to "United Services Eastleigh RFC" when captained by Flight Lieutenant Frielich with Corporal Freeman as vice-captain, with the administrative assistance of Squadron Leader Warren and Flight Officer Goodwin. Players of note during the club's early years include a three-quarter called Mickelthwaite, a fly-half called Cahou and another three-quarter, Tony Hale, all three of whom were on the cusp of selection for Kenya and/or East Africa.

=== Nakuru Sevens ===
Nakuru Sevens Winners
Year	Winners
1949	not known
1950	not known
1951	Nakuru RFC
1952	Nondescripts RFC
1953	Kenya Harlequin F.C.
1954	not known
1955	Old Cambrians (Impala) RFC
1956	Nyeri Police (Nyeri)
1957	Impala RFC
1958	Nakuru RFC
1959	Nakuru RFC
1960	Impala RFC
1961	Kenya Harlequin F.C.
1962	
1963	

The first Nakuru sevens were held in approximately 1949, usually being held fairly early in the season, attracting entrants from West Kenya and Central Province. The original cup was lost within a few years of the start of the tournament so early winners are uncertain. A replacement cup was kindly presented by Mr. HO Salt and was known as the Salt Cup.

=== Nile Sevens ===
Nile Sevens) Winners
Year	Winners
1950	Uganda Police
1951	Mengo Commercials
1952	Old Cambrians (Impala) RFC
1953	Jinja Stallions
1954	Jinja 'A'
1955	Uganda Police
1956	Kampala RFC
1957	Kenya Police RFC
1958	Kenya Police RFC
1959	Kampala RFC
1960	
1961	

The first Nile Sevens were held in 1950 and were held annually for at least the next ten years. The winner is presented with a mounted silver rugby ball known as the Krell Trophy which was presented in 1951 for this purpose by Mr. Cecil Krell who had done valuable work for rugby union in East Africa in both Dar es Salaam and Mombasa.

Teams for the Nile Sevens could be entered by clubs or by any combination of players, hence the unfamiliar team names for some of the winners.

=== Jones Cup (Sevens) ===
Jones Cup (Sevens) Winners
Year	Winners
1952	Kitale RFC
1953	Combined Eldoret RFC & Kitale RFC team

The Jones Cup was named after MJU Stompie Jones, a former Eldoret player whose representative playing career spanned an astonishing 20 years. He played for Kenya against the touring Combined South African Universities team in 1930 and against the University of Stellenbosch in 1935 and finally for East Africa against the University of Cape Town in 1949-50.

Ironically, having been named for someone who had demonstrated unparalleled longevity, the Jones Cup was to have a remarkably short tenure as a seven-a-side trophy. In 1954, after just two years, it was redesignated as the trophy for the winner of the West Kenya zone of the Enterprise Cup.

== Other sevens tournaments in Kenya ==
- International Competitions
  - Safari Sevens, hosted by the Kenya Rugby Football Union.
- Club Competitions
  - Kilunda Sevens, hosted by Kilunda RFC, Machakos Golf Club, Machakos.
