= 2015 Enterprise Cup =

- Countries: Kenya
- Tournament format(s): Knockout
- Champions: Kenya Commercial Bank RFC
- Matches played: 11

The 2015 Enterprise Cup was the 77th time that the Enterprise Cup has been contested.

== Fixtures and results ==
Wild-Card; 21 March 2015
Homeboyz RFC | 45
Blak Blad RFC | 3
Strathmore Leos | 38
Mean Machine RFC | 22
Western Bulls | 19
Mwamba RFC | 12
Kenya Harlequin | 39
Kabras Sugar RFC | 30

Quarterfinals; 28 March 2015
Nakuru RFC | 11
Homeboyz RFC | 13
Nondescripts RFC | 5
Strathmore Leos | 20
Impala RFC | 37
Western Bulls | 23
K.C.B. | 13
Kenya Harlequin | 8

Semifinals; 11 April 2015
Homeboyz RFC | 15
Strathmore Leos | 13
K.C.B. | 25
Impala RFC | 12

Final; 18 April 2015
K.C.B. | 28
Homeboyz RFC | 0
