= 2010 Victoria Cup =

Rugby cap

- Countries: Kenya; Uganda; Zimbabwe
- Tournament format(s): Round-robin
- Champions: Kenya (1st title)
- Matches played: 5
- Tries scored: 26 (5.2 per match)
- Top point scorer(s): Simiyu I. (30) Kenya
- Top try scorer(s): Simiyu I. (6) Kenya

The 2010 Victoria Cup took place during June and July 2010, and was the inaugural Victoria Cup with the national teams from Zimbabwe, Kenya and Uganda competing in a round robin tournament, with both home and away fixtures. Kenya was declared the winner after winning all 4 of its matches.

== Schedule ==
Click on the date in the first column to see more details on that match.

Date	Kickoff	Home	Score	Visitor	Venue	Notes
2010-06-12	1500h EAT	Kenya	11 – 10	Zimbabwe	RFUEA Ground, Nairobi, Kenya	Zimbabwe earned a bonus point for losing by less than 8 points.
2010-06-19	1600h EAT	Uganda	24 – 15	Zimbabwe	Kyadondo Grounds, Kampala, Uganda	
2010-07-03	1600h EAT	Uganda	25 – 33	Kenya	Kyadondo Grounds, Kampala, Uganda	(Elgon Cup - Rd 1) Both teams earn bonus point for scoring 4 tries.
2010-07-10	1600h EAT	Kenya	21 – 5	Uganda	RFUEA Ground, Nairobi, Kenya	(Elgon Cup - Rd 2) Kenya retain Elgon Cup and win inaugural Victoria Cup.
2010-07-17	1600h CAT	Zimbabwe	18 – 23	Kenya	Harare Sports Club, Harare, Zimbabwe	Zimbabwe earn bonus for losing by less than 8 and Kenya for scoring 4 tries.
2010-07-24	1600h CAT	Zimbabwe	–	Uganda	Harare Sports Club, Harare, Zimbabwe	Match cancelled

== 2010 Final Table of Standings ==
Team	Played	Won	Drawn	Lost	For	Against	Difference	Points	Bonus	TOTAL
Kenya	4	4	0	0	88	58	+30	16	2	18
Uganda	3	1	0	2	54	69	-15	4	1	5
Zimbabwe	3	0	0	3	43	58	-15	0	2	2

== 2010 points scorers ==
Player		Tries	Conversions	Penalties	Drop-goals	POINTS
Abuoga	Kenya		4	4		20
Ambunya	Kenya	1				5
Amonde	Kenya	1				5
Gurumani	Zimbabwe	1				5
Kiiza	Uganda		3	2		12
Kola	Kenya	1	1	2		13
Machanjaira	Zimbabwe	1				5
Mbanje	Zimbabwe	1				5
Mhende	Zimbabwe	1				5
Mudoola	Uganda	1				5
Makwanya	Zimbabwe		1	2		8
Mutai	Kenya	1				5
Odong	Uganda	1				5
Onen	Uganda	2				10
Robertson	Zimbabwe		1	1		5
Simiyu I	Kenya	6				30
Simiyu N	Kenya	2				10
Sseguya	Uganda	3	1			17
Tondoro	Zimbabwe	2				10
Wokorach	Uganda	1				5
TOTAL		26	11	11	0	185

== Match 1: Kenya v Zimbabwe ==
The Kenya head coach Michael "Tank" Otieno is an ex-Kenyan international who had played against Zimbabwe four times in his career and lost each time (1981, 1985, 1987 and 1989). The captain, Innocent Simiyu, had previously played Zimbabwe twice and won each time (2002 and 2003). Though the last match between the two sides was won by Zimbabwe these results describe the changing relative strengths of the two sides over the past 30 years, Kenya are stronger than they were though in truth the greater part of this change is a lowering of the standard of the game in Zimbabwe.

The Kenya squad included two new caps in the youngsters from the Kenya Harlequins club, David Ambunya and Patrice "Situational" Agunda. This was the first Kenyan international match that involved a decision from a Television Match Official (TMO); early in the second half, Zimbabwe crossed the Kenyan line but the referee was unsighted and sent the decision upstairs. The TMO ruled that the Zimbabwean ball carrier had been held up so the try was not awarded. The sables were leading 3-7 at half time. This defeat ended a four-match winning run for Zimbabwe, though it was their third successive away defeat by Kenya.

2010-06-12
16:00 EAT (UTC+3)

(44th 49.68) Kenya	11 – 10	Zimbabwe (47th 46.91)
Try: I.Simiyu (1); Con: none Pen: P.Abuoga (1); M.Kola (1); Drop: none	Report 1 Report 2	Try: L.Machanjaira (1); Con: D.Robertson (1); Pen: D.Robertson (1); Drop: none

RFUEA Ground, Nairobi, Kenya
Attendance: 3000
Referee: Ramsey Olinga (Uganda)
Assistant Referee: Gilbert Kwaya (Uganda)
Assistant Referee: David Kirabira (Uganda)
Match Commissioner: Paul Sigombe (Uganda)

Team Lists

(Kenya) KENYA
		Player	Club
FB	15	Vincent Mose	Impala RFC
RW	14	Victor Sudi	Kenya Harlequins
OC	13	Innocent Simiyu (c)	Impala RFC
IC	12	Patrice Agunda	Kenya Harlequins
LW	11	Peter Abuoga	Kenya Harlequins
FH	10	Nato Simiyu	Impala RFC
SH	9	Peter Mutai	Kenya Commercial Bank RFC	(substituted off) ≈55'
LP	1	Joel Nganga	Kenya Harlequins
HK	2	Vincent Ongera	Kenya Harlequins	(substituted off) ≈55'
TP	3	Daniel Kiptoo	Kenya Harlequins
LL	4	Wilson K'Opondo	Mean Machine RFC
RL	5	Michael Aung (vc)	Nondescripts RFC
BF	6	Ben Nyambu	Nondescripts RFC
OF	7	David Mogere	Kenya Harlequins
N8	8	Paul Oimbo	Impala RFC	(substituted off) ≈55'
Substitutes:
HK	16	Edwin Alubaka	Kenya Commercial Bank RFC	(substituted on) ≈55'
N8	17	Andrew Amonde	Kenya Commercial Bank RFC	(substituted on) ≈55'
	18	Tony Mutai	Kenya Harlequins
	19	Nzioka Muema	Impala RFC
SH	20	Moses Kola	Impala RFC	(substituted on) ≈55'
	21	David Ambunya	Kenya Harlequins
	22	Naftaly Bondo	Kenya Harlequins
Management:
Head Coach:		Michael Otieno
Asst Coach:		Edward Kinyany'	Kenya Harlequins
Asst Coach:		Charles Ngovi
Manager:		Leonard Simiyu
Physio:

ZIMBABWE (Sables) (Zimbabwe)
		Player	Club
FB	15	Tafadzwa Mhende
RW	14	Wesley Mbanje
OC	13	Daniel Hondo
IC	12	Paul Staak
LW	11	Lloyd Machanjaira
FH	10	Danny Robertson
SH	9	Tapiwa Mafi
LP	1	Vakai Hove
HK	2	Justin Buchanan
TP	3	Rocky Gurumani (c)
LL	4	Fortune Chipendo
RL	5	Zacks Tondoro
BF	6	Gardner Nechironga
OF	7	Jacques Leitao
N8	8	Norman Mukondiwa
Substitutes:
	16	Denford Mutamangira
	17	Prayer Chitenderu
	18	Sanele Sibanda
	19	Njabulo Ndlovu
	20	Scott Jones
	21	Josh Rowe
	22	Paul Jessub
Management:
Head Coach:		Brendon Dawson
Asst Coach:		Cyprian Mandenge
Manager:		Noddy Kanyangarara
Doctor:
Physio:		Farai Muguwe

== Match 2: Uganda v Zimbabwe ==
Sables' coach Brandon Dawson expressed displeasure at the referees' handled of both this and the Kenya game the previous week, stating that the quality of officiating is negatively impacting the development of the game in Africa. The match generated further press coverage when the Sables’ team manager Noddy Kanyangarara was accused of slapping the Ugandan liaison officer Chris Lubanga during an incident in which the Zimbabweans had complained about being booked into sub-standard accommodation. Lubanga is reported to have opened a case of assault at the Kira road police station.

However Dawson conceded that Zimbabwe can only focus on their own game and simply need to put these events and the two defeats behind them and move on. Kanyangarara said that the Zimbabwe team had wasted the few chances they had in the game, whereas Uganda had made the most of theirs.

2010-06-19
16:00 EAT (UTC+3)

(43rd 49.72) Uganda	24 – 15	Zimbabwe (48th 46.49)
Try: M.Wokorach; T.Mudoola; B.Odong; Con: B.Kizza (2); R.Seguya; Pen: B.Kizza; Drop: None	Report 1 Report 2	Try: W.Mbanje; Z.Tondoro (2); Con: None; Pen: None; Drop: None

Kyadondo Grounds, Kampala, Uganda
Attendance: 3000

Team Lists

(Uganda) UGANDA (Rugby Cranes)
		Player	Club
FB	15	Simon Wakabi	Uganda Kobs RFC
RW	14	Allan Musoke	Uganda Kobs RFC
OC	13	Michael Wokorach (vc)	Heathens RFC
IC	12	Tim Mudoola	Uganda Kobs RFC
LW	11	Dennis Etuket	Pirates RFC
FH	10	Benon Kizza	Heathens RFC
SH	9	Faisal Gamma	Heathens RFC
LP	1	Ronald Adigasi	Mongers RFC
HK	2	Alexander Mubiru	Heathens RFC
TP	3	Brian Odong	Uganda Kobs RFC
LL	4	Victor Wadia	Uganda Kobs RFC
RL	5	Timothy Dumba	Pirates RFC
BF	6	Robert Seguya	Heathens RFC
OF	7	Mathias Ochwo (c)	Heathens RFC
N8	8	Moses Soita	Pirates RFC
Substitutes:
	16	Solomon Mawanda	Pirates RFC
	17	Oscar Echulu	Uganda Kobs RFC
	18	Andrew Olweny	Mongers RFC	Temporarily suspended
	19	Steven Ogwete	Uganda Kobs RFC
	20	Phillip Karumuna	Pirates RFC
	21	Brian Jjemba	Pirates RFC
	22	Bishop Onen	Heathens RFC
Management:
Head Coach:		Ham Onsando
Asst Coach:		Sam Ahamya
Manager:		Brian Tabaruka
Doctor:		Dr.Leonard Were
Physio:		Benjamin Temper

ZIMBABWE (Sables) (Zimbabwe)
		Player	Club
FB	15	Tafadzwa Mhende
RW	14	Wesley Mbanje
OC	13	Daniel Hondo
IC	12	Paul Staak
LW	11	Lloyd Machanjaira
FH	10	Danny Robertson
SH	9	Tapiwa Mafi
LP	1	Vakai Hove
HK	2	Justin Buchanan
TP	3	Rocky Gurumani (c)
LL	4	Fortune Chipendo
RL	5	Zacks Tondoro
BF	6	Gardner Nechironga
OF	7	Jacques Leitao
N8	8	Norman Mukondiwa
Substitutes:
	16	Peter Joubert
	17	Prayer Chitenderu
	18	Brian Makamure
	19	Njabulo Ndlovu
	20	Tichara Makwanya
	21	Josh Rowe
	22	Paul Jessub
Management:
Head Coach:		Brendon Dawson
Asst Coach:		Cyprian Mandenge
Manager:		Noddy Kanyangarara
Doctor:
Physio:		Farai Muguwe

== Match 3: Uganda v Kenya ==
Prior to this match, Kenya were 41st on the IRB World rankings and 5th in Africa with 50.10 points, just a position and 0.01 points ahead of Uganda. The Kenyan victory earned them 0.30 points and a climb of 3 places to 38th, one shy of their best ever position since the World Rankings were introduced in October 2003. Uganda dropped to 43rd with 48.79 IRB points.

In the 2009 Elgon Cup, Uganda beat Kenya by 18-13 in Kampala but lost in Nairobi by 30-22, as holders, the Kenyans retained the trophy for a third consecutive year having won the cup in 2008. Kenya selected two international debutants to the replacements bench, Kevin Umbuge (scrum-half Impala RFC) and Felix Wanjala (lock/back-row Mean Machine RFC). Uganda selected Scot Oluoch and ex-captain John Musoke in their squad; Musoke missed the Zimbabwe game through commitments with the Uganda 7's team and Oluoch had been injured. Denis Etuket and Steven Ogwete were left out as a result. The match was televised live around the world on SuperSport 9 and, at their request, kickoff was moved forward from 16:30hrs to 16:00hrs due to the possibility of failing daylight affecting the quality of their feed towards the end of the match. This television coverage allowed for the use of a Television Match Official (TMO), the first occurrence of a TMO in Uganda, though his services were not required by the referee during the match.

The match was preceded on the same ground by the women's Elgon Cup match between Uganda and Kenya, Uganda winning 8 - 5.

2010-07-03
16:00 EAT (UTC+3)

(42nd 50.09) Uganda	25 – 33	Kenya (41st 50.10)
Try: Onen (1); R.Sseguya (3); Con: Kiiza (1); Pen: Kiiza (1); Drop: None	Report 1 Report 2	Try: I.Simuyu (2); T.Mutai(1); Amonde(1); Con: P.Abuoga (2); Pen: P.Abuoga (3); Drop: None

Kyadondo Grounds, Kampala, Uganda
Referee: Andrew Roberts (Zimbabwe)
Assistant referee: Nsikelelo Sibanda (Zimbabwe)
Assistant referee: Gabriel Masenda (Zimbabwe)
Television match official: Denis Odongkara (Uganda)
Assessor: David Kirabira (Uganda)

Team Lists

(Uganda) UGANDA
		Player	Club
FB	15	Benon Kiiza	Heathens RFC
RW	14	Philip Karumuna	Pirates RFC
OC	13	Faisal Gamma	Heathens RFC
IC	12	Andrew Olweny	Mongers RFC
LW	11	Mathias Ochwo (c)	Heathens RFC
FH	10	Robert Sseguya	Heathens RFC
SH	9	Romano Ogwal	Impis RFC
LP	1	Ronald Adigasi	Mongers RFC
HK	2	Alexander Mubiru	Heathens RFC
TP	3	Solomon Mawanda	Pirates RFC
LL	4	Brian Odong	Uganda Kobs RFC
RL	5	Oscar Echulu	Uganda Kobs RFC
BF	6	Victor Wadia	Uganda Kobs RFC
OF	7	Moses Soita	Pirates RFC
N8	8	Scott Oluoch	Heathens RFC
Substitutes:
	16	Brian Jjemba	Pirates RFC
	17	John Musoke	Rhinos RFC
	18	Tim Mudoola	Uganda Kobs RFC
	19	Bishop Onen	Heathens RFC
	20	Michael Wokorach	Heathens RFC
	21	Allan Musoke	Uganda Kobs RFC
	22	Simon Wakabi	Uganda Kobs RFC
Management:
Head Coach:		Ham Osando
Asst Coach:		Sam Ahamya
Manager:
Doctor:
Physio:

KENYA (Kenya)
		Player	Club
FB	15	Innocent Simiyu (c)	Impala RFC
RW	14	Peter Abuoga	Kenya Harlequins
OC	13	David Ambunya	Kenya Harlequins
IC	12	Patrice Agunda	Kenya Harlequins
LW	11	Victor Sudi	Kenya Harlequins
FH	10	Nato Simiyu	Impala RFC
SH	9	Moses Kola	Impala RFC
LP	1	Daniel Kiptoo	Kenya Harlequins
HK	2	Edwin Alubaka	Kenya Commercial Bank RFC
TP	3	Nzioka Muema	Impala RFC
LL	4	Anthony Mutai	Kenya Harlequins
RL	5	Michael Aung	Nondescripts RFC
BF	6	Andrew Amonde	Kenya Commercial Bank RFC
OF	7	Oscar Ouma	Nakuru RFC
N8	8	Lawrence Buyachi	Impala RFC
Substitutes:
	16	Vincent Ongera	Kenya Harlequins
	17	Joel Nganga	Kenya Harlequins
	18	Ronnie Mwenesi	Kenya Commercial Bank RFC
	19	Kevin Umbuge	Impala RFC
	20	David Mogere	Kenya Harlequins
	21	Felix Wanjala	Mean Machine RFC
	22	Kelvin Omiyo	Impala RFC
Management:
Head Coach:		Michael Otieno
Asst Coach:		Edward Kinyany'	Kenya Harlequins
Asst Coach:		Charles Ngovi
Manager:		Wangila Simiyu
Physio:		Chris Makachia

== Match 4: Kenya v Uganda ==
By winning this match Kenya retained the Elgon Cup and secured the inaugural Victoria Cup for themselves; even if Zimbabwe were to earn the maximum ten points from their remaining two fixtures they could not overtake Kenya. Kenya rose three places in the IRB rankings to 35th (51.40 points) whilst Uganda dropped to 44th with 48.79 points. This match was preceded by a women's match between the two countries; Kenya women beat Uganda's Lady Cranes by 16 points to 8 meaning that they also secured the women's Elgon Cup.

This match took place in Nairobi on the day before the July 2010 Kampala attacks which killed and injured many people at Uganda's home ground. There were no reported deaths from the rugby team (as of 15 July 2010); some of the players that had returned from the trip were at the club but preferred to sit upstairs in the members bar and escaped the full force of the explosion.

2010-07-10
16:00 EAT (UTC+3)

(38th 51.40) Kenya	21 – 5	Uganda (43rd 48.79)
Try: Simiyu N. (2); Simiyu I. (1); Con: Abuoga (2); Kola (1); Pen: none Drop: none	Report	Try: Onen (1); Con: none Pen: none Drop: none

RFUEA Ground, Nairobi, Kenya
Referee: Mark Lawrence (South Africa)
Assistant referee: Simbarashe Dangah (Zimbabwe)
Assistant referee: Gilbert Masenda (Zimbabwe)
Television match official: Nicholas Gachoya
Assessor: Oscar Oyowo

Team Lists

(Kenya) KENYA
		Player	Club
FB	15	Peter Abuoga	Kenya Harlequins
RW	14	David Ambunya	Kenya Harlequins
OC	13	Victor Sudi	Kenya Harlequins
IC	12	Gray Cullen	Nondescripts RFC
LW	11	Kelvin Omiyo	Impala RFC
FH	10	Innocent Simiyu	Impala RFC
SH	9	Felix Wanjala	Mean Machine RFC
LP	1	Edwin Alubaka	Kenya Commercial Bank RFC
HK	2	Vincent Ongera	Kenya Harlequins
TP	3	Nzioka Muema	Impala RFC
LL	4	Kevin Umbuge	Impala RFC
RL	5	Ronnie Mwenesi	Kenya Commercial Bank RFC
BF	6	Lawrence Buyachi	Impala RFC
OF	7	David Mogere	Kenya Harlequins
N8	8	Oscar Ouma	Nakuru RFC
Substitutes:
	16	Daniel Kiptoo	Kenya Harlequins
	17	Joel Ng’ang’a	Kenya Harlequins
	18	Anthony Mutai	Kenya Harlequins
	19	Andrew Amonde	Kenya Commercial Bank RFC
	20	Moses Kola	Impala RFC
	21	Nato Simiyu	Impala RFC
	22	Patrice Agunda	Kenya Harlequins
Management:
Head Coach:		Michael Otieno
Asst Coach:		Edward Kinyany'
Manager:		Simiyu Wangila
Asst Coach:		Charles Ngovi
Physio:		Christopher Makachia

UGANDA (Rugby Cranes) (Uganda)
		Player	Club
FB	15	Simon Wakabi	Uganda Kobs RFC
RW	14	Denis Etuket	Pirates RFC
OC	13	Michael Wokorach	Heathens RFC
IC	12	Timothy Mudoola	Uganda Kobs RFC
LW	11	Bishop Onen	Heathens RFC
FH	10	Benon Kizza	Heathens RFC
SH	9	Philip Karumuna	Pirates RFC
LP	1	Ronald Adigas	Mongers RFC
HK	2	Alex Mubiru	Heathens RFC
TP	3	Brian Odong	Uganda Kobs RFC
LL	4	Victor Wadia	Uganda Kobs RFC
RL	5	Moses Soita	Pirates RFC
BF	6	Robert Sseguya	Heathens RFC
OF	7	Mathias Ochwo	Heathens RFC
N8	8	Scott Oluoch	Heathens RFC
Substitutes:
	16	Solomon Mawanda	Pirates RFC
	17	Oscar Ochulu	Uganda Kobs RFC
	18	Romano Ogwal	Impis RFC
	19	Timothy Dumba	Pirates RFC
	20	Jude Kermundu	Heathens RFC
	21	Brian Jemba	Pirates RFC
	22	John Musoke	Rhinos RFC
Management:
Head Coach:
Asst Coach:
Manager:
Doctor:
Physio:

== Match 5: Zimbabwe v Kenya ==
Zimbabwe were without most of their South Africa-based players due to club rugby commitments, the exceptions being Rocky Gurumani and Vakai Hove. Having lost both matches in the Victoria Cup so far, motivation is low and problems have been simmering in the Sables camp. Only 17 players turned up for the Wednesday evening training session prior to this match out of a 30 called up. There were also reports of an argument between Themba Sibanda (the Zimbabwe Rugby Union president) and head coach Brendan Dawson during a meeting between the technical team and the union’s leadership on the Wednesday prior to the match; although neither spoke publicly about the row. Union vice president Judith Chiyangwa was also reported to have walked out as tensions mounted

This was Kenya’s fourth victory against Zimbabwe in their 12 international encounters, although it the first time that Zimbabwe have lost to Kenya at home. It was Zimbabwe's third consecutive loss winning them the mkamshi (wooden spoon) in the inaugural Victoria Cup. They will have to win, or at the very least tie, their last match with Uganda to avoid the rasharasha (whitewash). Conversely Kenya, by winning all four matches secured the tulipiga makubwa (grand slam) and rose to an all-time high position of 32nd in the IRB World rankings (with 52.85 points); a rise of 12 places since the beginning of the 2010 competition.

2010-07-17
16:00 CAT (UTC+2)

(47th 46.94) Zimbabwe	18 – 23	Kenya (38th 51.04)
Try: Mhende (1); Gurumani (1); Con: Makwanya (1); Pen: Makwanya (2); Drop: none	Report	Try: Ambunya (1); Simiyu I. (2); Kola (1); Con: none Pen: Kola (1); Drop: none

Harare Sports Club, Harare, Zimbabwe
Referee: Craig Joubert (South Africa)
Assistant Referee: Gabriel Masenda (Zimbabwe)
Assistant Referee: Nonsikelelo Sibanda (Zimbabwe)
Match commissioner: Freddy Ollows (Zimbabwe)

Team Lists

(Zimbabwe) ZIMBABWE (Sables)
		Player	Club
FB	15	Danny Robertson
RW	14	Paul Jessub
OC	13	Daniel Hondo
IC	12	Paul Staak
LW	11	Lloyd Machanjaira
FH	10	Tichafara Makwanya
SH	9	Scotty Jones
LP	1	Vakai Hove
HK	2	Prayer Chitenderu
TP	3	Rocky Gurumani (captain)
LL	4	Fortune Chipendo
RL	5	Zacks Tondoro
BF	6	Shingi Mpofu
OF	7	Jacques Leitao
N8	8	Njabulo Ndlovu
Substitutes:
	16	Brian Makamure
	17	Witness Mandizha	Old Hararian RFC
	18	Dimitri Zaverdinos
	19	Tendai Takavarasha
	20	Jan Ferreira	Matabeleland Busters RFC
	21	Rangarirai Zimbowa	Harare Sports Club
	22	Bruce Chibesa
Management:
Head Coach:		Brendan Dawson
Asst Coach:
Manager:
Doctor:
Physio:

KENYA (Kenya)
		Player	Club
FB	15	Innocent Simiyu (captain)	Impala RFC
RW	14	Peter Abuoga	Kenya Harlequins
OC	13	David Ambunya	Kenya Harlequins
IC	12	Kelvin Omiyo	Impala RFC
LW	11	Calvin Biko	Kenya Commercial Bank RFC
FH	10	Nato Simiyu	Impala RFC
SH	9	Moses Kola	Impala RFC
LP	1	Nzioka Muema	Impala RFC
HK	2	Edwin Alubaka	Kenya Commercial Bank RFC
TP	3	Daniel Kiptoo	Kenya Harlequins
LL	4	Anthony Mutai	Kenya Harlequins
RL	5	Ronnie Mwenesi	Kenya Commercial Bank RFC
BF	6	Andrew Amonde	Kenya Commercial Bank RFC
OF	7	Oscar Ouma	Nakuru RFC
N8	8	Lawrence Buyachi	Impala RFC
Substitutes:
	16	Vincent Ongera	Kenya Harlequins
	17	Joel Nganga	Kenya Harlequins
	18	Kevin Umbuge	Impala RFC
	19	David Mogere	Kenya Harlequins
	20	Duncan Ekasi-	Impala RFC
	21	Felix Wanjala	Mean Machine RFC
	22	Vincent Mose	Impala RFC
Management:
Head Coach:		Michael Otieno
Asst Coach:		Edward Kinyany'
Manager:		Simiyu Wangila
Doctor:
Physio:		Christopher Makachia

== Match 6: Zimbabwe v Uganda ==
The final match of the series was due to be played at 16:00 CAT (UTC+2) on 2010-07-24 at Harare Sports Club, Harare, Zimbabwe between Zimbabwe (51st 46.15) and Uganda (44th 48.13). Following the terrorist incident at Uganda's home ground, the Kyadondo Rugby Club, in Kampala the day after their last game against Kenya in Nairobi it was decided to cancel the match.

The game would have served little purpose in the competition other than to determine second and third place as Kenya had already secured the cup. It may have affected world rankings and would have been good experience for both teams but the Uganda Rugby Union said that "a significant number of their players were at the rugby club" at the time of the blast, and as a result the Ugandans have asked that the match be cancelled.

The referee was to have been Marius Jonker (South Africa)
