= Enterprise Cup =

Annual rugby union competition in Kenya, Tanzania and Uganda

- Current season or competition: 2023 Enterprise Cup
- Sport: Rugby union
- Formerly known as: East Africa Inter-District Championship
- Instituted: 1929
- Inaugural season: 1930
- Nations: Kenya Colony(1930–1963); Kenya(1964–present)^{[e]} (Tanganyika Territory) Tanganyika(1930–1963); Tanzania(1964–2009)^{[e]} Uganda Protectorate(1930–1963); Uganda(1964–2009)^{[e]}
- Holders: (Kenya) Kabras Sugar RC (2022)
- Most titles: (Kenya) (Kenya) Nondescripts RFC (Including 1 shared, 25 titles)
- Related competition: Mwamba Cup

The Enterprise Cup is an annual rugby union competition in Kenya, Tanzania and Uganda, though the competition frequently has the appearance of being an all-Kenyan affair as the majority of rugby clubs in the African Great Lakes region are based in this one country and frequently clubs in Tanzania and Uganda are unable to take part due to financial constraints. The original cup was donated by sailors from HMS Enterprise, who had toured British East Africa in 1928. The only years in which the competition has not been played is between 1940 and 1946 due to World War II and in 1987 because an international rugby competition was held on RFUEA Ground as part of the All Africa Games.

== History ==
=== Donation of the Cup to the Rugby Football Union of Kenya (RFUK)^{[a]} ===
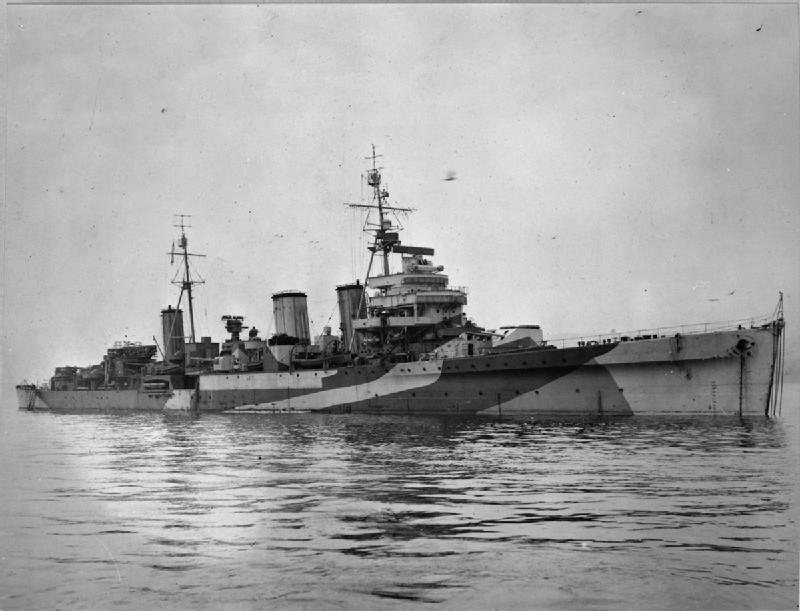
HMS Enterprise

HMS Enterprise was launched on 23 December 1919, and commissioned on 7 April 1926. At the end of her first commission with the 4th British Cruiser Squadron on the East Indies station she was ordered home via Mauritius and the main ports of East Africa. She pulled into Kilindini Harbour ten days before the arrival of Edward, Prince of Wales and his younger brother the Duke of Gloucester on SS Malda who had arrived in British East Africa to undertake a semi-official visit to Kenya, Uganda and Tanganyika, to participate in some big-game hunting and to enjoy the infamous delights of the Happy Valley set.^{[b]} A launch from Enterprise ferried the royal party ashore and over the next 36 hours the senior officers were invited to participate in various functions before the departure of the two princes for Nairobi the next evening on the overnight train.

The rugby team from HMS Enterprise, composed of 30 officers and men, then departed for a two-week tour of Kenya and Uganda playing Nakuru RFC, Kitale RFC, Kampala RFC, a combined Kericho/Londiani XV, a combined Thika/Ruiru XV, and the Mombasa Sports Club. In addition, several members of this body of men participated in a boxing tournament (Royal Navy versus Kenya) in Nairobi towards the end of the tour. Harold E. Stevens, Chaplain of HMS Enterprise and tour manager, offered to the RFUK, on behalf of the ships company, a silver trophy to be awarded annually to the winners of an Inter-district Championship. Rugby Union at this time was a fiercely amateur affair and rugby in Kenya was particularly so. Consequently, the offer was firmly but politely refused. HMS Enterprise left Mombasa and sailed to Zanzibar, Dar es Salaam and Tanga, playing a total of four more matches in these three ports, thus completing the first rugby tour of all three African Great Lakes nations by a Royal Naval vessel. She turned north and steamed for home via Aden (where her rugby team beat the local RAF XV but were defeated by the South Wales Borderers) and Port Suez.

Two hours out of Aden, however, she received orders to return to pick up the Prince of Wales from Dar es Salaam and carry him to Brindisi with all possible speed. His father, the then King George V, was seriously ill; astonishingly, this is not the only time that the heir to the British throne would receive news concerning the health of the monarch whilst they were visiting Kenya, Princess Elizabeth learned that she had become queen whilst staying at Treetops on 6 February 1952. The prince had been informed of the condition of his father while in northern Tanganyika as the guest of Baron and Baroness Blixen, Denys Finch Hatton and Alan Lascelles and had travelled to the coast on a hastily arranged express train. He boarded Enterprise on 2 December and she made a record passage of the 4,087 miles to Brindisi in eight days. The prince travelled onward to Bolougne by another special train, provided this time by the Italian government, and arrived at Buckingham Palace only nine days after leaving Dar es Salaam.

In East Africa we made rugger history by our up-country tour, being the first Naval team to venture so far into the heart of Darkest Africa. The rugger at times suffered from the effects of travelling and hospitality, but if our visit is not memorable for the number of our wins, we hope it will be remembered when the various districts come to play for the cup which we presented.

Harold E. Stevens, Chaplain of HMS Enterprise and tour manager

As this epic voyage was taking place, a parcel arrived at the headquarters of the Rugby Football Union of Kenya,^{[a]} containing a silver goblet. The officers and men of the Enterprise had made the most of the opportunity provided by their return to the African continent and had bought, inscribed and dispatched this trophy to Nairobi. The corinthian RFUK were thrown into turmoil, they wrote to thank the crew of Enterprise, yet still felt honour-bound to seek approval, in December 1928, from the Rugby Football Union in London and the South African Rugby Board of their plans to retain the trophy and to award it annually to the winners of an Inter-District championship. This cup has become central to rugby competition in the African Great Lakes and has been played for every year since with the exception of the war years (1940–1946) and 1987 when an international rugby competition was held on the RFUEA Ground as part of the All Africa Games.

=== The Annual Gymkhana ===
In 1929 the RFUK created a sub-committee to determine how best to go about initiating an Inter-district Championship, the problems of the distance between clubs and the poor transport links were, and still are, a major feature of rugby in the African Great Lakes region. They decided to make the most of a pre-existing Rugby Gymkhana (or Rugby Weekend), where once a year the clubs of Kenya came together to play some matches and to enjoy peripheral social and other activities. This weekend usually took place at Parklands Sports Club (the then home of Nondescripts RFC) in Nairobi which was both central and could guarantee more paying spectators than the smaller towns in the other districts. The proposed competition for 1929 failed to materialise, so the next year the RFUK agreed to subsidise the teams travel costs. As a result, the Enterprise Cup was first awarded to Nairobi district in 1930, coincidentally the year that HMS Enterprise made her second and final visit to Kenya.

The gymkhana had always been the highlight of the rugby calendar in the African Great Lakes, and the new Inter-District Championship further elevated its popularity. Two semi-finals were played on the Saturday and the final on Sunday with entertainment and dancing in the evenings. For this reason the halves were limited to 30 minutes (rather than the usual 40) in the semi-finals and 35 minutes in the final, with extra time in the event of a tie limited to 5 minutes each way. The trophy was presented to the winning captain immediately after the match.

=== Early competitions ===
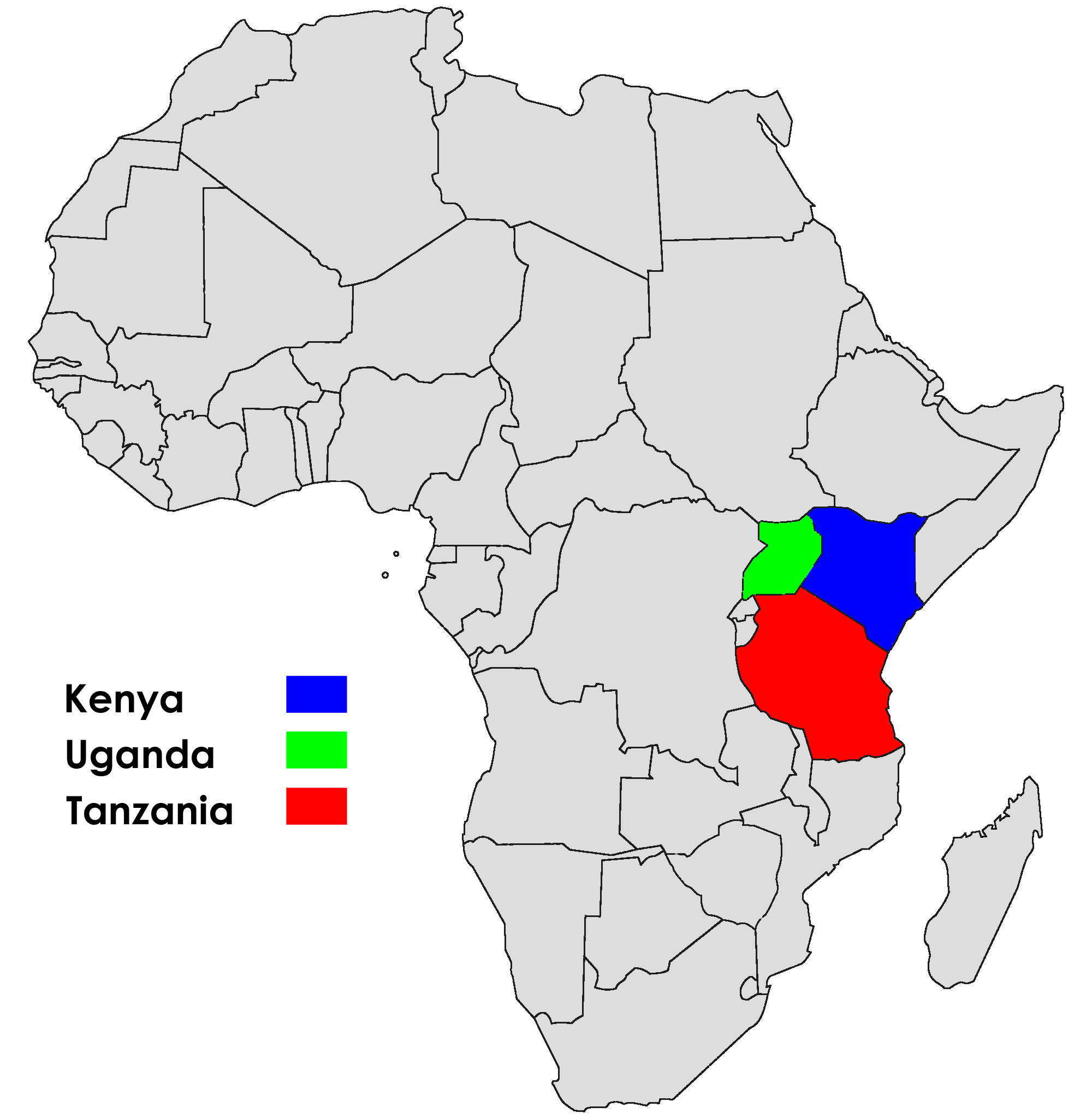
The countries from which the clubs that participate in the Enterprise Cup come

As had been requested by the crew of the ship that had presented the trophy, the competition was an inter-territorial one between four teams, Nairobi District (comprising the Nairobi clubs, Thika and Ruiru), Coast District (Mombasa Sports Club), Plateau District (Kitale and Eldoret) and Rift Valley District (Nakuru, Kericho and Londiani).

Nairobi had by far the greatest population and it seems that they were able to produce much the strongest team so it seems that the Nairobi district was divided the next year as the winners were "Nairobi North" in 1931. In 1932 Nairobi was sub-divided into three zones (Muthaiga/Kabete, Parklands and Town/Hill) and players were selected based upon where they lived. The other districts in that competition were Eldoret, Kitale, Mombasa, Ruiru and Nakuru; a total of eight. A preliminary game was played against the nearest neighbouring district and the four semi-finalists assembled in Nairobi at the annual gymkhana. 20% of the RFUK's budget (including all gate receipts from the gymkhana) were used to subsidise the travel costs that year. Additionally, the unwieldy Inter-District Championship name had become The Enterprise Cup.

Some players in Nairobi had found difficulty in putting aside their club loyalties so in 1933 the suggestion was made that the teams from Nairobi district should, as essentially was the case in every other district, be "clubs representing districts". A good suggestion that bore the test of time, though Nairobi was remarkably unsuccessful that year, the semi-finals on August 4 were Ruiru versus Mombasa and Eldoret versus Naivasha. The status quo was maintained with this same structure surviving until 1952, though discussion and debate continued.

The competition was stimulating rugby in British East Africa such that by 1937 there were 16 competing teams (Arusha, Dar es Salaam, Eldoret, Kakamega, Kitale, Muthaiga Country Club, Mombasa Sports Club, Naivasha, Nanyuki, Nakuru RFC, Nondescripts RFC, Nyeri, Old Cambrians, Ruiru, Tanga and Thika) and several hundred people watched the semi-finals (Eldoret v Nakuru and Nondescripts v Arusha) and the final, where Nondescripts defeated Eldoret. In 1938, the same four teams reached the semi-finals with the same results, though Eldoret prevailed over Nondescripts in the final. Nondescripts had beaten Muthaiga RFC during the Nairobi knockout stages, the latter club folded the next year.

In 1939, the Uganda Kobs RFC took part in the competition for the first time and were unlucky not to make the semi-finals, being beaten by the eventual winners, Eldoret, 8 points to 6. The competition was suspended for the ensuing seven years due to the war, resuming in 1947. In 1951 13 teams entered the competition; in Central Zone there was Nondescripts RFC, the Railway Club, Army, Old Cambrians and Ruiru/Thika combined, Eastern Zone consisted of Mackinnon Road, Mombasa and Northern Tanganyika (Arusha) and the Western Zone included Kitale, Eldoret, Nakuru RFC, Kericho and Uganda Kobs RFC.

In 1952 and 1953, the original district format was resurrected for two years and during this time the Enterprise Cup left the Highlands for the first time being won by Coast Province.

=== Coming of age ===
Despite this apparent leveling of the field, the competition returned to the clubs representing districts in 1954. The only difference being that West Kenya and Uganda produce a finalist between them while East Kenya, Coast and Northern Tanganyika produce the other. This system proved successful lasting eight years until it was adjusted in 1960 such that there were four geographic zones (Uganda, West Kenya, Central Province and Coast/Tanganyika) that were each responsible for producing a semi-finalist. A Western Zone finalist was produced by a semi-final between Uganda and West Kenya, while the Eastern Zone finalist was the winner of a match between Central Province and Coast/Tanganyika.

== 2015-16 Teams ==
For the 2016 tournament, twelve teams have been drawn in a knock out competition. The semi-finalists from the 2015 competition have been given byes to the quarter-final stage.

- Blak Blad RFC
- Homeboyz RFC
- Impala RFC
- Kabras Sugar
- Kenya Commercial Bank RFC
- Kenya Harlequin F.C.
- Mean Machine RFC
- Mwamba RFC
- Nakuru RFC
- Nondescripts RFC
- Strathmore University RFC
- Western Bulls RFC

=== Pre-Quarter-finals ===
Blak Blad RFC v Mean Machine RFC

Nondescripts v Top Fry Nakuru

Kabras Sugar v Kenya Harlequin

Mwamba v Western Bulls

== Winners of the Enterprise Cup^{[c]} ==
Note:^{[c]}

Year	Format	Winner	Score	Runner-up
1930	Inter-District	Nairobi District	–	
1931	Inter-District (Nairobi divided)	Nairobi North^{[d]}	–	
1932	Inter-District (Nairobi divided)	West Kenya (Eldoret RFC)	–	
1933	Clubs representing Districts	Eldoret RFC	–	Ruiru RFC
1934	Clubs representing Districts	Eldoret RFC	6-3 –	Kisumu RFC
1935	Clubs representing Districts	Eldoret RFC	9-0 –	Arusha RFC
1936	Clubs representing Districts	Eldoret RFC	14-5 –	Dar-es-Salaam
1937	Clubs representing Districts	Nondescripts RFC	11–4	Eldoret RFC
1938	Clubs representing Districts	Nondescripts RFC	19–9	Eldoret RFC
1939	Clubs representing Districts	Eldoret RFC	–	Nondescripts RFC
1940	Competition suspended due to World War II			
1941	Competition suspended due to World War II			
1942	Competition suspended due to World War II			
1943	Competition suspended due to World War II			
1944	Competition suspended due to World War II			
1945	Competition suspended due to World War II			
1946	Competition suspended due to World War II			
1947	Clubs representing Districts	Eldoret RFC	12–5	Nondescripts RFC
1948	Clubs representing Districts	Nakuru RFC	–	
1949	Clubs representing Districts	Nondescripts RFC	–	Eldoret RFC
1950	Clubs representing Districts	Nondescripts RFC	–	
1951	Clubs representing Districts	Nondescripts RFC	–	
1952	Inter-District	Coast Province	–	
1953	Inter-District	West Kenya	–	
1954	Clubs representing Districts with Zone semi-finals	Nondescripts RFC	13–6	Eldoret RFC
1955	Clubs representing Districts with Zone semi-finals	Kenya Harlequin F.C.	–	Nondescripts RFC
1956	Clubs representing Districts with Zone semi-finals	Kampala RFC	14–3	Kenya Harlequin F.C.
1957	Clubs representing Districts with Zone semi-finals	Kenya Harlequin F.C.	–	Kitale RFC
1958	Clubs representing Districts with Zone semi-finals	Nakuru RFC	–	Kenya Police RFC
1959	Clubs representing Districts with Zone semi-finals	Kenya Police RFC	–	
1960	Clubs representing Districts with Zone quarter-finals	Nakuru RFC	–	
1961	Clubs representing Districts with Zone quarter-finals	Impala RFC	8–6	Nakuru RFC
1962	Clubs representing Districts with Zone quarter-finals	Nakuru RFC	11–3	Nondescripts RFC
1963	Clubs representing Districts with Zone quarter-finals	Nakuru RFC	17–9	Impala RFC
1964	Clubs representing Districts with Zone quarter-finals	Kenya Harlequin F.C.	–	
1965	Clubs representing Districts with Zone quarter-finals	Impala RFC	16–14	Kampala RFC
1966	Clubs representing Districts with Zone quarter-finals	Nondescripts RFC	–	
1967	Clubs representing Districts with Zone quarter-finals	Kitale RFC	–	
1968	Clubs representing Districts with Zone quarter-finals	Kampala RFC	–	
1969	Clubs representing Districts with Zone quarter-finals	Kampala RFC	–	Kenya Harlequin F.C.
1970	Clubs representing Districts with Zone quarter-finals	Kampala RFC	–	
1971	Clubs representing Districts with Zone quarter-finals	Impala RFC	11–9	Nondescripts RFC
1972	Clubs representing Districts with Zone quarter-finals	Impala RFC	–	
1973	Inter-club knockout	Impala RFC	–	Nondescripts RFC
1974	Inter-club knockout	Impala RFC	50–15	Kenya Harlequin F.C.
1975	Inter-club knockout	Nondescripts RFC	–	Impala RFC
1976	Inter-club knockout	Nondescripts RFC	–	
1977	Inter-club knockout	Nondescripts RFC	–	
1978	Inter-club knockout	Nondescripts RFC	–	
1979	Inter-club knockout	Nondescripts RFC	–	
1980	Inter-club knockout	Nondescripts RFC	26–8	Mwamba RFC
1981	Inter-club knockout	Nondescripts RFC	12–0	Mwamba RFC
1982	Inter-club knockout	Nondescripts RFC	–	
1983	Inter-club knockout	Nondescripts RFC	–	
1984	Inter-club knockout	Nondescripts RFC	–	
1985	Inter-club knockout	Mwamba RFC	9–6	Barclays RFC
1986	Inter-club knockout	Mwamba RFC	–	
1987	No competition due to 1987 All Africa Games			
1988	Inter-club knockout	Kenya Harlequin F.C.	–	Mwamba RFC
1989	Inter-club knockout	Nondescripts RFC	–	
1990	Inter-club knockout	Nondescripts RFC	15–8	Barclays Bank RFC
1991	Inter-club knockout	Nondescripts RFC	–	Mwamba RFC
1992	Inter-club knockout	Nondescripts RFC	–	Mean Machine RFC
1993	Inter-club knockout	Nondescripts RFC	–	
1994	Inter-club knockout	Nondescripts RFC	–	
1995	Inter-club knockout	Kenya Harlequin F.C.	–	
1996	Inter-club knockout	shared between Kenya Harlequin F.C. and Nondescripts RFC	12–12	
1997	Inter-club knockout	Mombasa Sports Club	–	Nondescripts RFC
1998	Inter-club knockout	Nondescripts RFC	–	
1999	Inter-club knockout	Kenya Harlequin F.C.	19 - 17	Mean Machine RFC (University of Nairobi)
2000	Inter-club knockout	Impala RFC	–	Nondescripts RFC
2001	Inter-club knockout	Impala RFC	–	
2002	Inter-club knockout	Impala RFC	–	
2003	Inter-club knockout	shared between Kenya Harlequin F.C. and Impala RFC	16–16	
2004	Inter-club knockout	Kenya Commercial Bank RFC	33–5	Impala RFC
2005	Inter-club knockout	Impala RFC	24–19	Mwamba RFC
2006	Inter-club knockout	Mwamba RFC	19–17	Kenya Harlequin F.C.
2007	Inter-club knockout	Kenya Commercial Bank RFC	28–16	Mean Machine RFC
2008	Inter-club knockout	Nakuru RFC	34–24	Mwamba RFC
2009	Inter-club knockout	Kenya Harlequin F.C.	19–6	Impala RFC
2010	No competition due to restructuring of the Kenya rugby calendar			
2011	Inter-club knockout	Kenya Harlequin F.C.	10–3	Impala RFC
2012	Inter-club knockout	Kenya Commercial Bank RFC	^{[f]}	
2013	Inter-club knockout	Mwamba RFC	15–10	Nakuru RFC
2014	Inter-club knockout	Nakuru RFC	18–13	Kenya Commercial Bank RFC
2015	Inter-club knockout	Kenya Commercial Bank RFC	28–0	Homeboyz RFC
2021	Inter-club knockout	Kabras Sugar RC		
2022	inter-club knockout	Kabras Sugar RC	–	

== Notes ==
a. The RFU-K was dissolved in 1953 with the formation of the Rugby Football Union of East Africa (RFUEA); the current Kenya Rugby Football Union (KRFU) was not formed until 1970.

b. Among rich English settlers in Kenya's Happy Valley between the wars, cocaine, according to Sir Derek Erskine, was taken like snuff. While attending a dinner party with the Prince of Wales in 1928, Erskine saw another guest being physically removed from the room. When Erskine asked what had happened, he was told, "Well, there is a limit, even in Kenya, and when someone offers cocaine to the Heir to the Throne, something has to be done about it, particularly when it is between courses at the dinner table." White Mischief, book (and later film) written by James Fox.

c. Winners for all matches 1930–2005 have been collected from The Enterprise Cup 1930–2005 (seventy five years of sporting achievement) pp. 50–51, taking into account the included errata that correct mistakes in the first publication. Runners up and scores for these years have been elucidated from text in this book and in Rugby Football in East Africa 1909–1959. Other finalists and scores have individual citations.

d. There appears to be an error in The Enterprise Cup 1930–2005 (seventy five years of sporting achievement) pp. 50–51. Rugby Football in East Africa 1909–1959 and Programme of Fifth Tuskers tour of Zambia 1975 list the 1931 winners as "Nairobi North", not "Nairobi".

e. In 2009 no teams from Tanzania or Uganda have entered the competition, not because they have been excluded but due to funding problems.

f. Awarded by default when Harlequins, Impala and Nondescripts refused to play the semi-finals without their international players.
