= Kenya Cup =

Rugby union competition in Kenya

- Competition logo
- Sport: Rugby union
- Instituted: 1970
- Number of teams: 11
- Country: Kenya
- Holders: Kabras Sugar RC (2022)
- Most titles: Nondescripts RFC (17 titles)
- Website: Kenya Cup Official Website
- Related competition: Nationwide League; Eric Shirley Shield

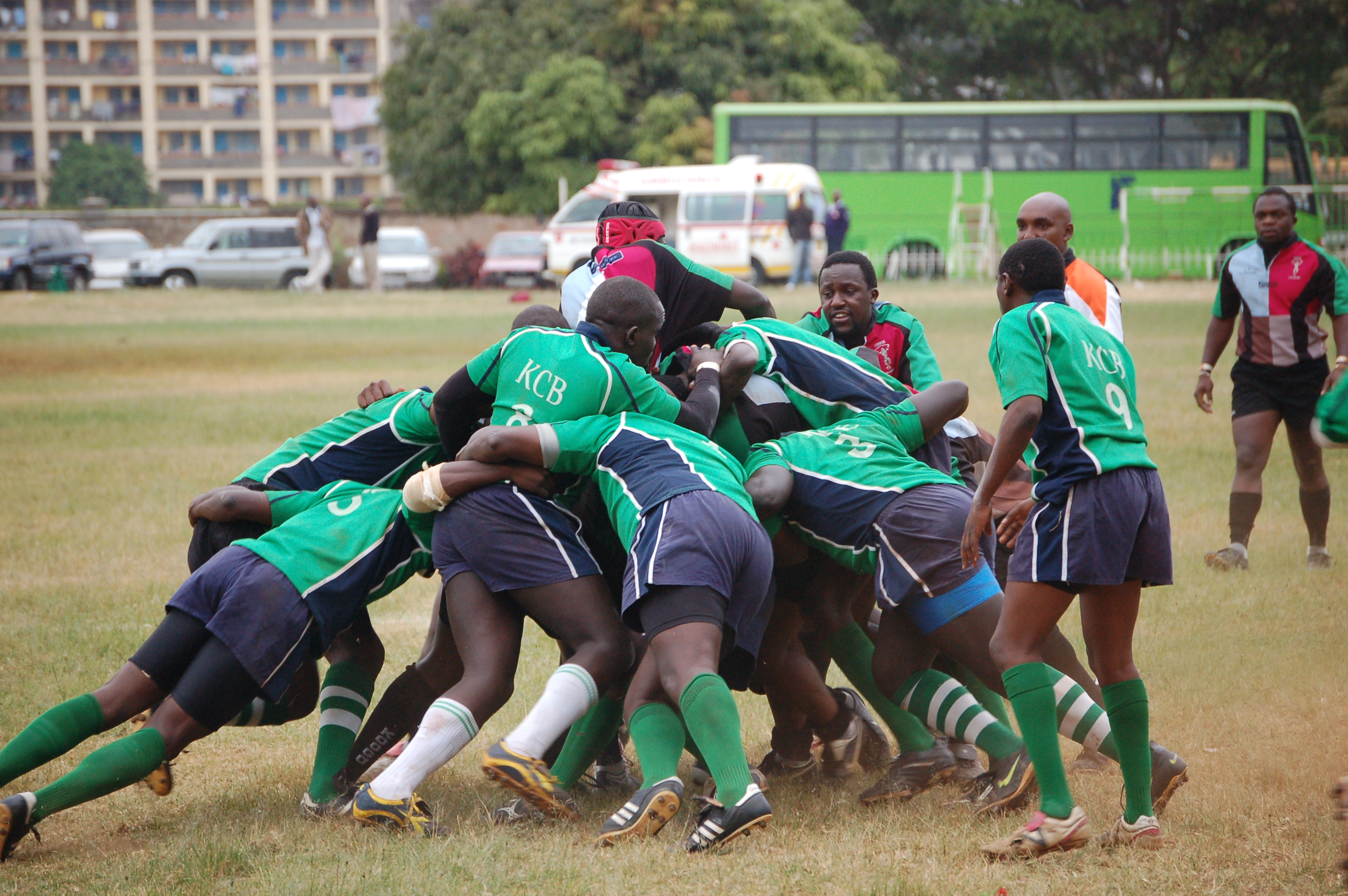
A maul during a match between KCB RFC and Quins

The Kenya Cup is the top tier club rugby union competition in Kenya organized by the Kenya Rugby Union. For the 2019-2020 season, twelve teams are divided into two pools of six, Each team plays home and away against each team in its pool and once against each team in the other pool. The top six teams in the single-table format qualify for the playoff finals: the top two teams secure a home semi-final. The other four teams are paired into two knock-out games: the winners of the two games each play one of the two top-ranked teams (that had secured an automatic semi-final berth). The winners of the two semi-final fixtures play in the final to determine the overall winner(the top-ranked team before the playoffs hosts the final).

Promotion and relegation exists between the Kenya Cup, Championship and Nationwide leagues. The two lowest placed teams in the Kenya Cup are relegated to the Championship, and the top two teams in the Championship are promoted to the Kenya Cup. Games are played on Saturday afternoons usually preceded by corresponding fixtures in the Eric Shirley Shield.

The Kenya Cup was founded in 1970 by the newly formed Kenya Rugby Football Union with the first tournament won by Impala RFC.

KCB RFC retained the Kenya Cup for a third successive time after a 23-15 victory over Kabras Sugar in the final contested on 18 May 2019 at the Kakamega Showgrounds.

== 2021 Kenya Cup teams ==
Team	Location	Stadium	Capacity
Kenya Harlequin F.C.	Nairobi	RFUEA Ground	6,000
Menengai Oilers	Nakuru City	Nakuru Showgrounds	6,000
Blak Blad RFC	Nairobi City	Kenyatta University Grounds	5,000
Kabras Sugar RFC	Kakamega City	Bull Ring Kakamega	5,000
Nondescripts RFC	Nairobi	Ngong Race Course	5,000
Impala Saracens	Nairobi City	Impala Ground	2,000
KCB RFC	Nairobi	The Den	2,000
Mwamba RFC	Nairobi	Nairobi Railways Club	2,000
Top Fry Nakuru RFC	Nakuru	Nakuru Athletic Club	2,000
MMUST RFC	Kakamega City	MMUST Grounds	1,000
Strathmore Leos	Nairobi	Strathmore University Grounds	1,000

== 2021 Kenya Cup Final Standings ==
These are the final standings of the Kenya Cup.

2021 Kenya Cup Table
	Club	Played	Won	Drawn	Lost	Points for	Points against	Points diff	Bonus Points	Points
1	Kabras Sugar RU	10	10	0	0	401	81	320	9	49
2	KCB CH	10	9	0	1	313	149	164	8	44
3	Menengari Oliers SF	10	6	1	3	215	184	28	4	30
4	Strathmore Leos SF	10	4	2	4	227	186	41	7	27
5	Kenya Harlequin	10	4	2	4	219	232	-13	5	25
6	MMUST	10	4	1	5	151	204	-53	2	20
7	Nondescripts	10	4	1	5	132	180	-48	-1	17
8	Impala Saracens	10	3	2	5	144	210	-66	1	17
9	Mwamba	10	1	3	6	108	225	-117	4	13
10	Top Fry Nakuru	10	2	0	8	148	266	-118	2	10
11	Blak Blad	10	1	2	7	111	252	-141	1	9
Green background (rows 1 to 4) are play-off places and earns a berth in the Semi-Finals of the competition. Red background (row 11) Relegation to Kenya Nationwide League. (CH) Champions. (RU) Runners-up. (SF) Losing semi-finalists. Final Standings — source:
Tiebreakers for teams tied on points: 1) Number of matches won; 2) Difference between points for and against; 3) Total number of points for; 4) Aggregate number of points scored in matches between tied teams; 5) Number of matches won excluding the first match, then the second and so on until the tie is settled

== Champions ==
The previous champions of the Kenya Cup are:

- 1970: Impala RFC
- 1971: Impala RFC
- 1972: Impala RFC
- 1973: Impala RFC
- 1974: Impala RFC
- 1975: Nondescripts RFC
- 1976: Nondescripts RFC
- 1977: Mean Machine RFC
- 1978: Nondescripts RFC
- 1979: Nondescripts RFC
- 1980: Nondescripts RFC
- 1981: Nondescripts RFC
- 1982: Nondescripts RFC
- 1983: Mwamba RFC
- 1984: Nondescripts RFC
- 1985: Nondescripts RFC
- 1986: Nondescripts RFC
- 1987: Barclays Bank RFC
- 1988: Nondescripts RFC
- 1989: Mean Machine RFC
- 1990: Mean Machine RFC
- 1991: Nondescripts RFC
- 1992: Nondescripts RFC
- 1993: Nondescripts RFC
- 1994: Nondescripts RFC
- 1995: Kenya Harlequin F.C.^{[a]}
- 1996: Kenya Harlequin F.C.
- 1997: Nondescripts RFC
- 1998: Nondescripts RFC
- 1999: Kenya Harlequin F.C.
- 2000: Impala RFC
- 2001: Impala RFC
- 2002: Impala RFC
- 2003: Kenya Harlequin F.C.
- 2004: Impala RFC
- 2005: KCB RFC
- 2006: KCB RFC
- 2007: KCB RFC
- 2008: Kenya Harlequin F.C.
- 2009: Impala RFC
- 2010: Kenya Harlequin F.C.
- 2011: Kenya Harlequin F.C.
- 2012: Kenya Harlequin F.C.
- 2013: Nakuru RFC
- 2014: Nakuru RFC
- 2015: KCB RFC
- 2016: Kabras Sugar RC
- 2017: KCB RFC
- 2018: KCB RFC
- 2019: KCB RFC
- 2021: KCB RFC
- 2022:Kabras Sugar RC
- 2023:Kabras Sugar RC
- 2024:Kabras Sugar RC
- 2025:Kabras Sugar RC

a. This webpage states that Harlequins had also had "Previous Kenya Cup victories: 1955, 1957, 1964, 1988". This is probably incorrect as these are years that Harlequins won the Enterprise Cup.The Kenya Cup was inaugurated in 1970. Before 1970 the competition which was held was called the Nairobi District Championship. However the 1995 victory seems likely as it is included in a list that also shows the Enterprise Cup win that year.

=== Titles by team ===
Team	Titles	Years won
Nondescripts RFC	17	1975, 1976, 1978, 1979, 1980, 1981, 1982, 1984, 1985, 1986, 1988, 1991, 1992, 1993, 1994, 1997, 1998
Impala RFC	10	1970, 1971, 1972, 1973, 1974, 2000, 2001, 2002, 2004, 2009
KCB RFC	8	2005, 2006, 2007, 2015, 2017, 2018, 2019, 2021
Kenya Harlequin	8	1995, 1996, 1999, 2003, 2008, 2010, 2011, 2012
Kabras Sugar	5	2016, 2022, 2023, 2024, 2025
Mean Machine RFC	3	1977, 1989, 1990
Nakuru RFC	2	2013, 2014
Mwamba RFC	1	1983
Barclays Bank RFC	1	1987
