= Oscar Ayodi =

Kenyan rugby sevens player

- Born: September 21, 1989 (age 37) Vihiga, Kenya
- Height: 1.84 m (6 ft 0 in)
- Weight: 94 kg (207 lb)

Rugby union career
- Position: Center
National sevens team
Years	Team	Comps
- Kenya 7s

Oscar Ayodi (born September 21, 1989) is a Kenyan rugby sevens player. He competed for Kenya 7s at the 2016 Summer Olympics. He was also part of the team that won the 2016 Singapore Sevens, Kenya's first tournament victory. He shared the DHL Impact Player award at the Singapore Sevens with Kitione Taliga of Fiji.
