= Leah Wambui =

Kenyan rugby sevens player

Leah Wambūi
Personal information
- Nationality: Kenyan
- Born: 21 May 1989 (age 37)

Sport
- Sport: Rugby sevens

Leah Wambūi (born 21 May 1989) is a Kenyan rugby sevens player. She competed in the women's tournament at the 2020 Summer Olympics.
