= Nakuru Athletic Club =

Kenyan sports club

Nakuru Athletic Club is a sports club located in Nakuru capital of Nakuru County, Kenya. The club also has a cricket team playing in the Rift Valley cricket league. The club ground has hosted many High-profile cricket games including a game featuring Rift Valley Cricket Association XI v Minor Counties of England.

The Nakuru Athletic Club is also home ground for Nakuru RFC, a local rugby union team.

Nakuru Athletic club has also a field hockey team playing in the National League.

Nakuru's football team, Nakuru AllStars, who play in the Nationwide Division, has their training sessions at Nakuru Athletic Ground.

FG Soccer Academy - Nakuru's premier soccer academy, a non for profit soccer school that combines football, character development and education also uses Nakuru Athletic Ground as their training complex.

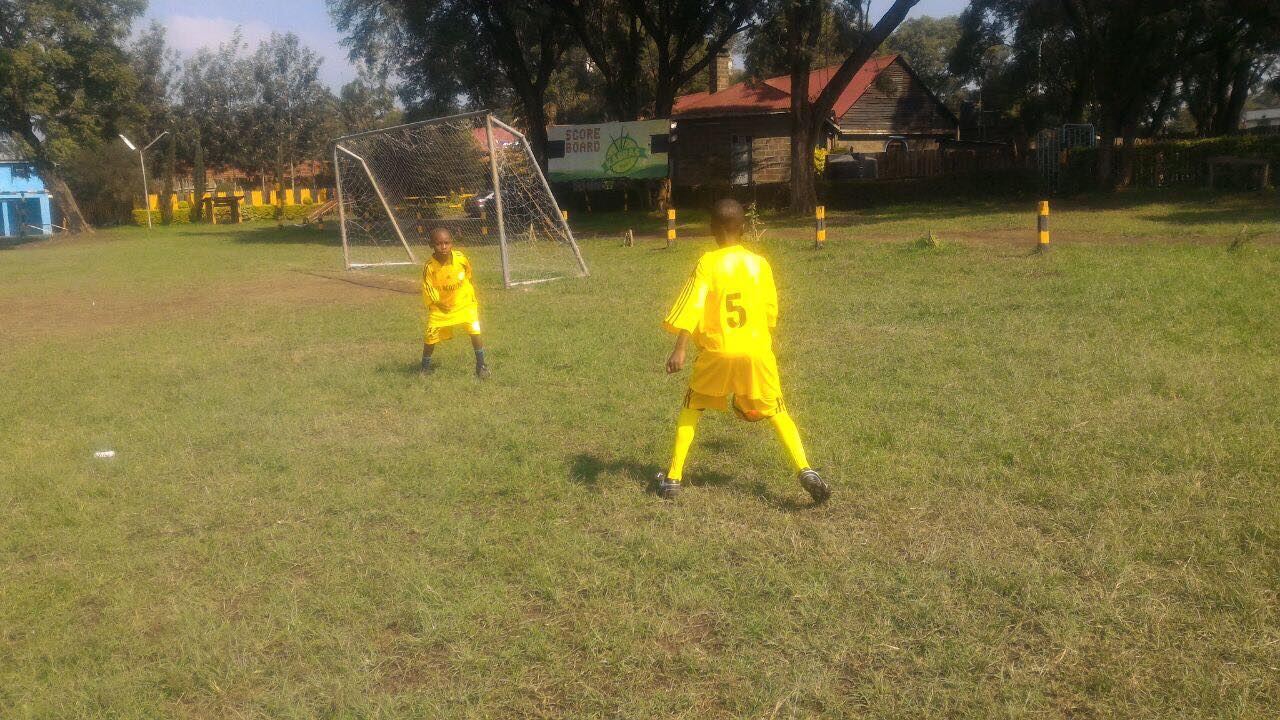

Under the colonial rule, indigenous Kenyan were barred from Nakuru Athletic Club. Thus they were using the “African Sports Stadium,” now known as Afraha Stadium.
