= Kenya Commercial Bank RFC =

Kenyan rugby union club

(Kenya) KCB RUGBY CLUB
- Full name: KCB Rugby Club
- Union: Kenya Rugby Union
- Nickname: The Lions
- Founded: 1989
- Ground(s): KCB Sports Club, Ruaraka (The Lions‘ Den) (Capacity: 2,000)
- Chairman: Sadik M. Makii
- Coach: Andrew Amonde
- Captain: Bob Muhati
- Top scorer: Festus Shiasi
- League(s): Kenya Cup, Eric Shirley Shield
- 2017-2023: 1
Team kit

KCB Rugby Club is a rugby union team based in Nairobi, Kenya. It was formed in 1989 after the disbanding of Kenya Breweries RFC when their main sponsor, Kenya Breweries, pulled out. That year they joined the Kenya Cup. Their first match was against Impala RFC, whom they beat 96–6. In 1994 the team was relegated to the Eric Shirley Shield, however by 1996 they had regained their position in Kenya's top rugby league. The club now has a 2nd XV team which has performed well, winning the Mwamba Cup, and Eric Shirley Shield several times.

== History ==
=== The beginning ===
The history of Kenya Commercial Bank Rugby Football Club cannot be told without that of Kenya Breweries Rugby Football Club, its forerunner. Kenya Breweries RFC was formed in 1983 when a few employees of the parent company Kenya Breweries Limited (KBL) who had played rugby for other clubs felt the need to start their own institutional side. Among the pioneer players were flanker Justus Mugaa M’mpwii who had featured for Mean Machine RFC and Mwamba RFC and the first captain D. Maina who had featured for Impala RFC at fly half.

The first training sessions took place in August 1983 at the Jamhuri High School in Nairobi. Many KBL employees who had never touched a rugby ball in their lives and members of Jamhuri high school rugby team enthusiastically signed up to play for the team. Kenya Breweries RFC played their first ever match, a friendly against Barclays Bank RFC at the RFUEA grounds in October of the same year and made their first competitive appearance at the Jamhuri Sevens in December.

1984 saw the team join the Eric Shirley Shield, the Kenyan second division rugby union league, earning promotion to the first division Kenya Cup in 1987. They would be relegated back to the Eric Shirley Shield in 1988 but returned to the Kenya Cup in 1989. The team received a jolt in February 1989 when the sponsor, KBL announced plans to disband a majority of its sports teams with the exception of its soccer and netball teams.

=== The aftermath ===
KBL's decision threw the team into confusion. There were crucial decisions to be made with players wondering whether they would disperse and go their separate ways. A few players ended up at Barclays Bank RFC. Some joined to Mwamba RFC, only to end up at Nondescripts RFC after a short stay. Some players held the view that the KBL players should approach Mwamba RFC where they would be accommodated amicably, while other team members felt that they had built a strong bond that could see them approach institutions for sponsorship as a rugby entity.

Talks were held with many organizations but it was a meeting between hookers Hezekiah Jerome Ougo, Sadik Makii and Patrick Odanga, a former Mwamba and Kenya player who was an employee of Kenya Commercial Bank (KCB) that bore fruit. Further talks followed leading to the formation of Kenya Commercial Bank RFC who were belatedly admitted in the 1989 Kenya Cup to take the place of the now defunct Kenya Breweries RFC.

The club constitutionally changed its name from Kenya Commercial Bank Rugby Football Club (KCB RFC) to Kenya Commercial Bank Rugby Club (KCB RC) at the beginning of the 2010–2011 rugby season. The club dropped the word "Football" from its name after Kenya Rugby Football Union, whom they are affiliated with, dropped theirs in the KRU constitution amended on 15 January 2010 and adopted on 26 February 2010.The constitution was further amended on 28 August 2023 to professionalise the playing unit and structures of the club

=== Current squad ===
As of 16 March 2019.

1st team squad

- Oscar Sorano
- Peter Kaaria
- Curtis Lilako.
- Davis Chenge
- Oliver Mang'eni.
- Brian Nyikuli
- Andrew Amonde
- Peter Waitere
- Michael Wanjala
- Ken Moseti
- Stafford Abekah
- Brian Omondi
- Peter Kilonzo
- Isaac Njoroge
- Tony Onyango
- Griffin Musila
- Moses Amusala
- Nelson Nyandat.
- Ian Indimuli
- Rocky Aguko
- Samuel Asati
- Adrian Opondo
- Billy Isabwa

2nd team squad

- Nesta Okotch
- Jerry Olola
- George Gichure
- Dan Othieno
- Brodie Kagai
- Elly Mukaizi
- James Ochieng
- Edwin Otieno
- Marlin Mukolwe
- Stephen Osumba
- Mike Kimwele
- Elphas Adunga
- George Maranga
- Bill Clinton Humwa
- Joshua Mwangi
- Godfrey Otieno
- Mannaseh Oduor
- Calvin Sule
- Ray Lilako
- Paul Ombwayo
- William Kumo
- Collins Wanjala
- Mike Wekesa

== Playing kit ==
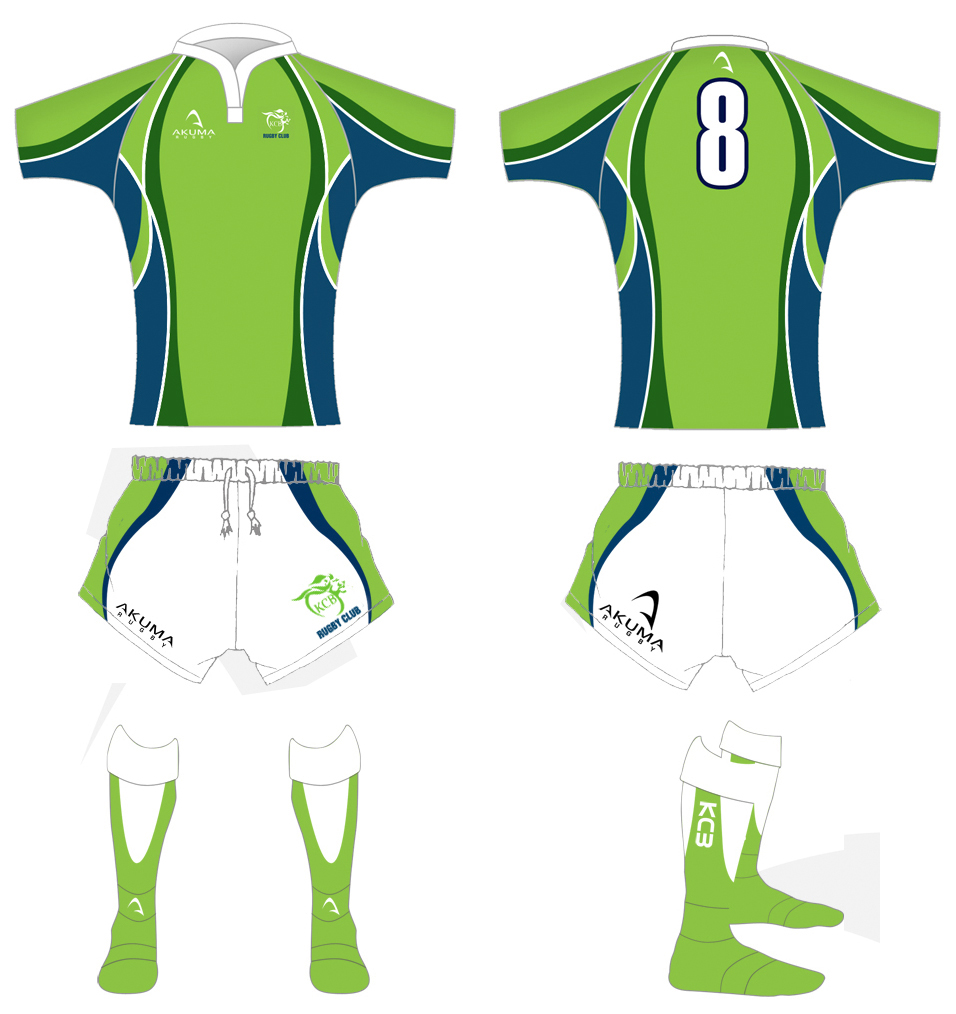
Illustration showing the current playing kit of KCB Rugby Club.

KCB Rugby club playing kit has green as its main color. It is an adaptation from their sponsor, Kenya Commercial Bank, who have light green as one of their corporate colors.

In the early days of the rugby club, the jersey had green, red and white stripes to portray the bank's corporate colors. This was revised and when the bank's corporate identity changed in both logo and color the adaptation was green as the dominant color followed by dark blue and then white.

The second-tier side usually wears kit that is blue dominant in color. They also wear either blue or black shorts unlike the white shorts of the 1st tier side. Currently there is no real distinction in kits between the 1st and 2nd tier sides but, as per club tradition, the new kit of the season is donned by the 1st tier side.

Warm-up jerseys are usually polo neck or round-neck t-shirts provided by Kenya Commercial Bank. The colors vary depending on the product being promoted by the bank's marketing department.

== Performance ==
In 2004 and 2007, they won the Enterprise Cup, they have also won the Kenya Cup 4 times, 3 of them between 2005 and 2007 and one in the 2014–15 season.

This is a summary of the club's performance over the years:

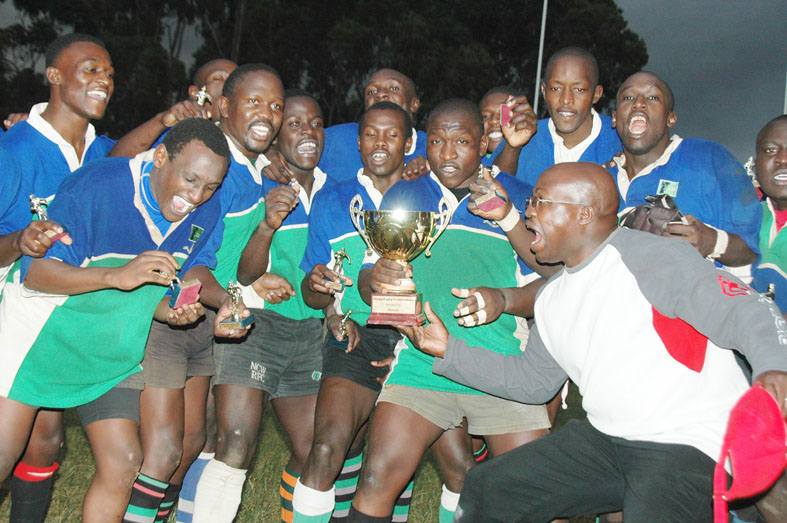
KCB Rugby Club players celebrate after clinching the Kenya Cup trophy in 2006 at The Lions Den, Ruaraka.

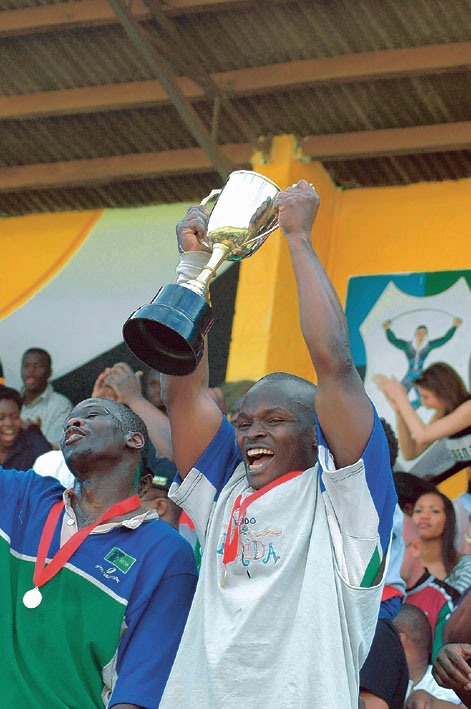
KCB Rugby Club hold aloft the Mwamba Cup trophy of 2006 after winning it at the RFUEA grounds.

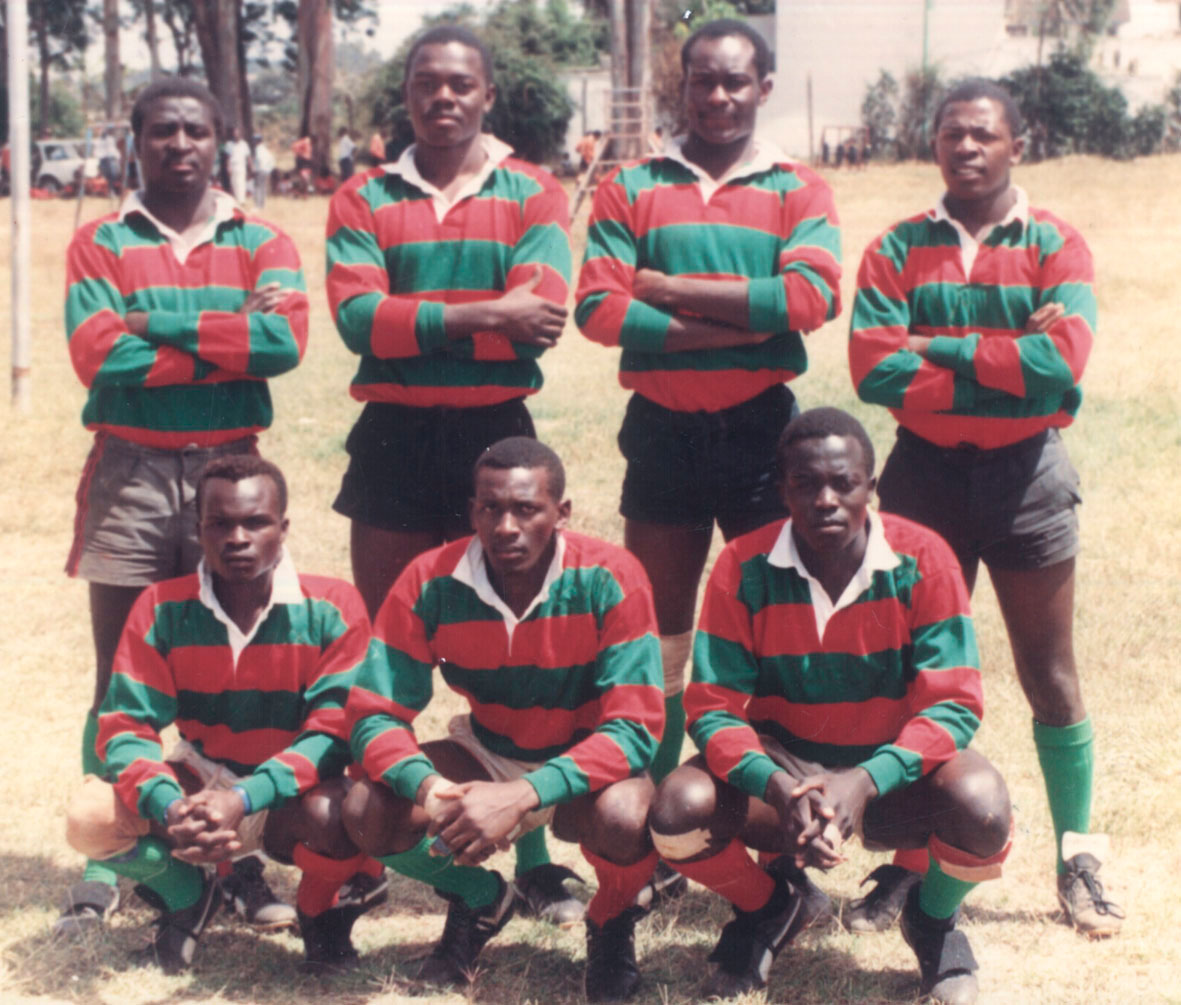
KCB Rugby Club 7-a-side squad at RFUEA Grounds. They were the 1992 winners of the Christie Sevens tournament.

1992

- Kenya Cup 3rd position
- Blackrock Winners
- Christie Sevens Winners

1994

- Relegated from Kenya Cup to Eric Shirley Shield (ESS)

1995

- Eric Shirley Shield Winners (unbeaten and promoted to Kenya Cup)

1996

- Blackrock joint winners with Impala RFC
- Impala Floodlit Runners Up

1999

- Kenya Cup 3rd position

2002

- Kenya Cup Runners Up
- KRFU Fair Play Award Winners

2003

- Kenya Cup 3rd position
- KRFU Chairman's Cup Runners Up
- Impala Floodlit 4th position

2004

- Enterprise Cup Winners
- Kenya Cup Runners Up
- Mwamba Cup Winners
- Eric Shirley Shield Winners
- National 7s Circuit Runner Up
- Participated in Safari 7s

2005

- Kenya Cup Winners
- Impala Floodlit Winners
- Mwamba Cup Winners

2006

- Kenya Cup Winners
- KRFU Chairman's Cup Winners
- Impala Floodlit 3rd position
- Mwamba Cup Winners

2007

- Kenya Cup Winners
- Enterprise Cup Winners
- Impala Floodlit Winners
- Blackrock Winners

2008

- Kenya Cup 3rd position
- KRFU Chairman's Cup Runners Up
- Impala Floodlit 3rd position
- Eric Shirley Shield Winners

2009

- Kenya Cup Runners Up
- Impala Floodlit Runners Up

2010–2011

- Kenya Cup Runners Up
- Impala Floodlit Runners Up

2011–2012

- Kenya Cup 3rd Place
- ESS 3rd Place
- Enterprise Cup Winners
- Mwamba Cup Winners
- Christie Seven's Winners

2012–2013

- Christie 7s, Driftwood 7s Winners
- "One-Night-Stand" Winners
- Chairman's Cup Winners
- Kenya Cup 3rd Place
- National 7s Circuit Runner Up

2013–2014

- Sports Personality of the Year 2014 Award (SOYA) 2nd Runner Up
- Driftwood 7s Winners
- Prinsloo 7s Winners
- Christie 7s Winners
- National 7s Circuit (Safaricom 7s Circuit) Overall Winners
- Safaricom 7s (2013) - Shield Winners
- Impala Floodlit Winners
- Great Rift 10s Winners
- Chairman's Cup Winners
- Mwamba Cup Winners
- Eric Shirley Cup (ESS) Shield Winners
- Kenya Cup Runner Up
- Enterprise Cup Runner Up

2014–2015

- Sports Personality of the Year 2014 Award (SOYA) Winners
- Dala 7s Winners
- Kabeberi 7s Winners
- Driftwood 7s Winners
- National 7s Circuit Winners
- Floodlit Winners
- Kenya Cup Winners
- Enterprise Cup Winners
- ESS Runner Up
- Mwamba Cup Runner Up
- Great Rift 10s Runner Up
- Kakamega 10s Winners

2015–2016

- National 7s Circuit - Ranked 4th
- Floodlit Winners
- Kenya Cup - Ranked 4th
- ESS - Ranked 3rd

== See also ==
- Kenya Commercial Bank S.C.
