= Mombasa Sports Club =

Kenyan football club

Mombasa Sports Club Ground
- MSC Pronounced EM-ES-CEE

Ground information
- Location: Mombasa, Kenya
- Capacity: 1,000

International information
- First ODI: 11 November 2006: Kenya v Bermuda
- Last ODI: 20 February 2012: Kenya v Ireland
- First T20I: 22 February 2012: Kenya v Ireland
- Last T20I: 24 February 2012: Kenya v Ireland

Team information
Kenya	(1986 – present)
- As of 7 January 2021; Source: Cricinfo

Mombasa Sports Club (MSC) is multi-sport club based in Mombasa, Kenya. It also owns sporting facilities. The club was established in 1896, and it is among the oldest sporting clubs in Kenya.

== Cricket ==
Mombasa Sports Club has a cricket team taking part in the Coast Cricket Association competitions.

=== Cricket ground ===
The Mombasa Sports Club ground is the only fully accredited ODI Cricket ground in Kenya outside of Nairobi. Its acquired this status prior to hosting a three match ODI series between Kenya and Bermuda as well as a triangular ODI Tournament featuring Kenya, Canada and Scotland, in 2006. Providing all the cricket for Ireland's tour of the country in 2012, this venue has hosted fifteen international fixtures (twelve ODI and three T20I), also six first-class matches (initially in 1964) and 22 List A matches.

== Hockey ==
The club has field hockey sections for men and women. In 2008, MSC ladies team plays in 1st level National league, while their men counterparts play in the premier league. In 2011, the Men's team finishes a top their National League and get promoted to the Premier League. In 2012, in their first year, they finish 9th out of 12 teams and ensure Kenya Hockey Premier League survival for the 2013 Season ahead of regulars; Mvita XI, Karate Axiom and Western Jaguars. The 2013 Season Kicks Off with the Mombasa Derby, MSC vs Mvita XI on 8 June 2013, before a flurry of four matches against: Western Jaguars, Green Sharks, Kenya Police and Strathmore

== Rugby ==
MSC Rugby team plays in the Kenya Cup league, the highest level rugby union competition in Kenya. The club started playing rugby in 1935. The MSC Rugby Grounds, most recently hosted the Confederation of African Rugby tournament that brought together Over 8 national teams to a qualifier tournament in Mombasa, among them, Zimbabwe, Namibia and Morocco

== Football ==
Their football team takes part in regional level football competitions.

== Other sports ==
Other disciplines at Mombasa Sports Club include Basketball, Squash, Snooker, Tennis, Bowling and Bridge.

== List of Centuries ==
=== One Day Internationals ===
No.	Score	Player	Team	Balls	Inns.	Opposing team	Date	Result
1	111	Steve Tikolo	Kenya	98	1	Bermuda	14 November 2006	Won
2	123*	Ryan Watson	Scotland	120	2	Canada	18 January 2007	Won
3	113	Ravindu Shah	Kenya	121	1	Scotland	21 January 2007	Won

== List of Five Wicket Hauls ==
=== One Day Internationals ===
No.	Bowler	Date	Team	Opposing team	Inn	Overs	Runs	Wkts	Econ	Batsmen	Result
11	Dwayne Leverock	14 November 2006	Bermuda	Kenya	1	10	53	5	5.3	David Obuya; Steve Tikolo; Collins Obuya; Jimmy Kamande; Nehemiah Odhiambo	Lost
