= Eric Shirley Shield =

Rugby union tournament in the Kenyan domestic league

- Current season or competition: 2017-2018
- Sport: Rugby union
- Instituted: 1962
- Number of teams: 12
- Country: Kenya
- Holders: (Kenya) KCB II (2017-2018)
- Related competition: Kenya Cup

The Eric Shirley Shield is a rugby union tournament in the Kenyan domestic league. It was founded in 1962 as a second tier competition to the Nairobi District Championship

For the 2016-2017 season, the league consists of twelve teams divided into two pools. Participating teams are reserve sides from clubs participating in the top tier Kenya Cup. There are sixteen rounds of pool games followed by a knockout competition to determine an overall winner.

== Pool A ==
- Kabras II
- KCB II
- Mean Machine II
- Mwamba II
- Nakuru II
- Western Bulls II

== Pool B ==
- Blak Blad II
- Homeboyz II
- Impala II
- Quins II
- Strathmore II
- Nondescripts II

== Champions ==
There was a major upset in 1982 when Lenana School won the shield.

- 2018: KCB II
- 2017: Impala II
- 2016: Impala II
- 2015: Impala II
- 2014: KCB II
- 2012: Quins II
- 2011: Homeboyz RFC
- 2010: Homeboyz RFC
- 2009: Quins II
- :
- 1982: Lenana School
- :
- :
- :
- 1977: Lenana School
- 1967 Nondescripts
