= Strathmore University RFC =

Strathmore Leos
- Founded: 2004
- Location: Nairobi, Kenya
- Ground: Strathmore Sports Complex
- Coach: John Mbai
- Captain(s): Dan Othieno & John Oduk
- 2012 season: 1st

Strathmore University Rugby Football Club is a rugby team based in Kenya which was formed in 2004. The team is a member of Kenya Rugby Football Union and the Kenya Universities Sports Association (KUSA). The teams is also known as the "Strathmore Leos". It was first allowed to play in events organized by Kenya Rugby Football Union 2005. The team's coach then was Mitch Ocholla, who had been serving in the position since June 2012. In August 2017, John Mbai was appointed the new head coach, taking over from Ocholla, who moved to Nakuru Rugby Club to take up a similar role.
