= Kenya Harlequin F.C. =

Kenyan rugby union club, based in Nairobi

- Full name: Kenya Harlequin Football Club
- Union: Kenya Rugby Union
- Nickname(s): Quins, Kenya Quins
- Founded: 1951; 75 years ago
- Location: Ngong Road, Nairobi, Kenya
- Region: Nairobi
- Ground: RFUEA Ground (Capacity: 6,000)
- Chairman: (Kenya) Victor Sudi
- Director of Rugby: Joel Ng'ang'a
- Coach: (Kenya) Patrice Agunda
- Captain: Jeffrey Kiragu
- League: Kenya Cup Enterprise Cup
- 2023/2024: 4th, Semis
Team kit

Kenya Harlequin Football Club, (Harlequins or Quins for short) is a Kenyan rugby union club that competes in the Kenya Cup, the top level of Kenyan rugby. The club motto "Nunquam Dormio" is Latin, meaning I never sleep.

== History ==
There was an earlier Harlequins R.F.C. in Nairobi which was formed in 1923 when the Nairobi District team decided, because it had become too powerful, to split and create two clubs, Harlequins RFC and Nondescripts RFC. It seems likely that the two names were chosen either in concert or one as a tongue-in-cheek response to the other as nondescript means lacking distinctive or interesting features or characteristics whilst harlequins are associated with bright colors and striking patterns. Nondescripts RFC is still in existence, but this first Harlequin club lasted up to 1945. Photos exist of Harlequins playing against the Prince of Wales School during the war years. The current Harlequin F.C. did not (contrary to popular belief) rise phoenix-like from the ashes of the first, though it is logical to assume that it provided the inspiration for the name.

=== Formation of the Club ===
The Kenya Harlequin F.C. was formed when, in 1951, a group of enthusiasts decided that there were enough players in and around the capital to allow the formation of another team; teams already in existence in the capital at this time included Nondescripts RFC, Old Cambrians RFC, the Nairobi Railway Club RFC, Kenya Civil Service RFC, Kenya Police RFC, Nairobi Garrison RFC and Royal Air Force RFC. The idea was put forward by Peter Barron (later to become the club's first honorary secretary) and Ben Cook. The idea was received by Mr. D. M. Goldstein (then honorary secretary to the RFU-K) and Mr. John Parry. The club was formed in 1952 and immediately sought affiliation with the London Harlequin F.C. in England. The committee contacted the London club to ask whether Harlequin badges could be sewn onto the shirts; however, due to a misunderstanding only one badge was sent, which was sewn to the captain's shirt for the first game.

=== Affiliation ===
The affiliation gives the club the right to wear the London club colors (namely: - light blue, magenta, chocolate, French grey, reversed on the back, sleeves light green and black reversed, white shorts and dark stockings with the club colors in diamonds around the tops), the honour extending not only to the playing kit, but to all uses of colors and insignia including the blazer badge, tie and honours caps. This honour had only been granted to three other clubs prior to this, Pretoria Harlequins (South Africa, founded in 1906), Melbourne Harlequins (Australia, founded in 1928, affiliated 1948 and Hamilton Harlequins (New Zealand founded in 1938).

Though the Hobart Harlequins (Tasmania, Australia) were formed in 1934 they did not seek affiliation until much later, making them the fifth member of the group. The sixth sister club was the Dallas Harlequins (Texas, United States) who were formed in 1971 but not granted affiliation until 1983. In 2004 the Future Hope Harlequins RFC of Kolkata, India were welcomed into the family and the latest club that has been brought into the fold is the Abu Dhabi Harlequins in 2008; Etihad being the mutual sponsor of this and the London club, were instrumental in bringing about the latter connection.

=== Beginnings ===
The Kenya Harlequins won their very first match which was played in April 1952 against the Nairobi Railway Club RFC; they completed their first full competitive season that same year and by 1953 there were enough playing members for the club to field two teams. The club won the Nakuru Sevens in 1953 and its first Nairobi District Championship (NDC) in 1954; by the 1954 season the club had defeated at least once every club they had met and had traveled a total of 2,130 miles that year to fulfill their fixtures. The club's record for the 1954 season is as follows:

Team	Played	Won	Drawn	Lost	For	Against
First XV	13	9	3	1	251	42
'A' XV	9	7	0	2	151	48
TOTAL	22	16	3	3	402	90

The club shared the NDC title in 1955, 1956 and 1958 they won the Enterprise Cup in 1955 and 1957 and were runners up the intervening year. By 1960 they had made two visits to Dar es Salaam in Tanzania and had toured Uganda. Much of this early success was due to Hugh Steel, John Tanner and Owen Wheeler (a Scottish trialist with two English county caps).

In 1961, Harlequin FC of London undertook a tour of East Africa in conjunction with Pretoria Harlequins from South Africa, as guests of the Kenya Harlequin F.C. and the Rugby Football Union of East Africa; winning five games and drawing one. This was the first time that three sister clubs of the Harlequin family all played each other in a coordinated series of matches and at 19 days it was the longest overseas tour undertaken by a British club up to that time.

=== Recent Outgoing Tours ===
Kenya Harlequin undertook a tour of the UK and Ireland in 1986 and three tours to South Africa in 1996, 1999 and 2001 as guests of Pretoria Harlequins. Zimbabwe and Uganda were the destinations in 2003 while the under 21 side has visited Tanzania on an annual basis since 2002, hosted by the Dar es Salaam Leopards RFC.

== Honors ==
- 1953 – Nakuru Sevens Cup
- 1954 – Nairobi District Championship
- 1955 – Enterprise Cup & Nairobi District Championship (Shared)
- 1957 – Enterprise Cup & Nairobi District Championship (Shared)
- 1959 – Nairobi District Championship (Shared)
- –
- 1964 – Enterprise Cup
- –
- 1995 – Kenya Cup & Enterprise Cup
- 1996 – Kenya Cup, Enterprise Cup (Shared with Nondescripts RFC), Eric Shirley Shield & Nakuru Tens Cup
- 1997 – Kenya Cup & Impala Floodlit Tournament Cup
- 1999 – Kenya Cup, Enterprise Cup & Kenya National Sevens Circuit Champions
- 2003 – Kenya Cup, Enterprise Cup (Shared with Impala RFC), Christie Sevens Cup, Nakuru Tens Cup & Driftwood Sevens Cup
- 2004 – Driftwood Sevens Cup
- 2008 – Kenya Cup
- 2009 – Enterprise Cup, Eric Shirley Shield (Second XV)
- 2010 – Kenya Cup
- 2011 – Kenya Cup & Enterprise Cup
- 2012 – Kenya Cup

== Current squad ==
Name	15's Honors	7's Honors
Peter Abuoga	Kenya	Shujaa
Edwin Achayo	Kenya
Isaac Adimo	Kenya
Eden Agero	Kenya	Shujaa
Leon Adongo		Kenya
Patrice Agunda	Kenya	Shujaa
David Ambunya	Kenya
Willy Ambaka		Kenya
Sidney Ashioya	Kenya	Kenya
Felix Ayange		Kenya
Naftali Bondo		Shujaa
James Kangethe	Kenya
Joe Kangethe	Kenya
Daniel Kiptoo	Kenya
Wilson Kopondo	Kenya	Kenya
David Mogere	Kenya
Tony Mutai	Kenya
Joel Nganga	Kenya
Vincent Ongera	Kenya
Allan Onyango	Kenya	Shujaa
Chris Oduor	Kenya 'A'
Victor Oduor		Kenya
Jared Owinyo	Kenya
Kevin Okeyo
Leroy Anyembe
Max Theuri		Kenya
Victor Sudi	Kenya	Kenya
Allan Omuka	Kenya
