= Nakuru RFC =

Kenyan rugby union club, based in Nakuru

(Kenya) Nakuru
- Full name: Nakuru Rugby Football Club
- Location: Nakuru, Kenya
- Ground: Nakuru Athletic Club (Capacity: 2,000)
- Captain: Edwin Anunda
- League(s): Kenya Cup, Eric Shirley Shield

Nakuru Rugby Football Club (RFC), also known as Wanyore, is a Kenyan rugby club based in Nakuru. It has played for several years in the Kenya Cup and Eric Shirley Shield leagues run by the Kenya Rugby Football Union. Nakuru RFC operates and trains at the Nakuru Athletic Club Grounds in Nakuru. They play at the 2,000-capacity Nakuru Stadium.

Nakuru RFC participates in Kenya Cup (the league) alongside Kisumu, Eldoret, Western Bulls, Kabras and Mombasa. In addition to the senior team, Nakuru RFC has a second team, Nakuru II which participates in the Eric Shirley Shield. The club also runs a "mini rugby program", a development women's team, and a scholarship program for talented underprivileged players. The management committee consists of the chairman and a nine-man sitting committee who run the affairs of the club.

The team finished second in the 2012 Kenya Cup (Premier Rugby League in Kenya) before being crowned champions in 2013. In 2014, the team is in the hunt for double honours yet again, qualifying for the finals of both the Kenya Cup, and Enterprise Cup.

The Team also boast of an elaborate youth development system, with Under 12, Under 14 and Under 16 sides.

Nakuru RFC is host to the two international tournaments in the Kenya Rugby Union Calendar: The Great Rift 10-A-Side and The Prinsloo Sevens (named after a late supporter and member) part of the National Sevens Circuit.

In 2008, the club won its first major trophy for decades after winning the Enterprise Cup (the national cup competition). The club also won the Enterprise Cup in 1948, 1958, 1960, 1962 and 1963.

Nakuru RFC are joint winners of their own Great Rift 10-A-Side Tournament 2011 edition with Strathmore Leos. This came after a long dry spell of trophies in the 10-A-Side version of the game.

== Notable players ==
- Dallo Chituyi
- Davis Yangah
- Edwin Anunda
- Edwin Shimenga
- Edwins Makori
- Gibson Weru
- Isaiah Nyariki
- Joseph Maina
- Martin Mwita
- Martin Owillah
- Mike Okombe
- Monate Akuei
- Nick Lang'o
- Oscar Ouma
- Phillip Kwame
- Sammy Warui
- Shem Ndeithi
- Simon Wariuki
