= Impala Saracens =

Kenyan rugby union club, based in Nairobi

(Kenya) Impala
- Full name: Impala Saracens
- Union: Kenya Rugby Football Union
- Founded: 1956
- Location: Nairobi, Kenya
- Region: Nairobi Province
- Ground(s): Impala Ground, 2,000 capacity
- League: Kenya Cup
Team kit

Official website
- impalasaracens.com

Impala Saracens is a Kenyan rugby club based at the Impala Club (a sporting/country club in Nairobi, Kenya). The club competes in the Kenya Cup as well as the Enterprise Cup. The club is based and trains at their ground on Ngong Road, adjacent to the RFUEA Ground, and also has an association football division.

== History ==
The origin of the present Rugby Section of the Impala Club dates back to 1930 when an old boy of the Prince of Wales School (now Nairobi School), Gregory Comninos, started raising teams of old boys to play regular mid-week matches against the School. These matches proved to be a very popular and the possibility of starting an official club was put forward. A meeting was held at the Prince of Wales School and the Old Cambrians Club was launched. It was decided at this time that the club would wear the Welsh colours as their kit. The club initially prospered however, shortly after the acquisition of their Ngong Road ground in 1949, the club went through extremely tough times, the low-point being the 1953 season when no rugby was played. A decision was made to re-launch the club under the name Impala RFC, with many of the old players and coaching staff staying on. This led to a return in strength of the club, and in 1959 they enjoyed an unbeaten season (though ironically this powerful team were not allowed to enter the Enterprise Cup competition due to vagaries in the then qualification process which required them to have finished in the top three of the previous year's Nairobi District Championship). Impala continued to prosper into the Sixties, winning the Enterprise Cup in 1961 & 1965.

They won the Enterprise Cup consecutively for four years from 1971 to 1974 and several seven-a-side tournaments during the same period. Between 1980 and 1995 the quality of rugby at Impala went into decline however since then they have returned to take their place as one of the top three rugby clubs in the capital. Impala has since then performed well in the two major 15-a-side competitions in Kenya rugby, the Kenya Cup and Enterprise Cup. They won both these titles in 2000, 2001, 2002, 2003 (shared with Harlequins) and 2005. They also won the Kenya Cup and Supremacy Cup (a one-off match at the end of each season between the Enterprise Cup winners and the Kenya Cup winners) in 2009 beating Harlequins in both instances.

== Notable players ==
- Moses Kola
- Israel Soi
- Nato Simiyu
- Vincent Mose
- Paul Oimbo
- James Rautta
- Felix Makori
- Frank Ndong
- Anthony Nyandigisi
- Xavier kipnegitch
- Kelvins Karani
- Lameck Dunde
- Sammy Oliech
- Robert Aringo
- Richard Sidindi (Jadhah - now deceased)
- Harritone Munai
- Duncan Ekasi
- Edgar Obino
- David Moenga
- Joel Omer
- Tyson Okoth
- Antony Odhiambo
- Brian Nyikuli
- Steve Shammah

=== Kenya Simbas ===
- Samson Onsomu
- Linus Nato Simiyu
- Dennis Karani
- Simon Muniafu
- Xavier Kipngetich
- Vincent Mose

Brian Nyikuli

== Historical Honours for Impala Players ==
=== East Africa / Tuskers ===
- Adams, H.A.
- Andrews. Mike
- Barnes, Mike
- Booyse, L.
- Brown, D.G.D.
- Brown, Tom
- Cobb, Andy
- Chubb, J.A.
- Davies, Gareth
- Hiley, Peter.
- Isherwood, B.
- Leask, Roy
- Lillis, Kevin
- Mason, Joe
- Mills, Peter
- Mitchell, Arnold
- Muhato, John
- Onsotti, Chris
- Parker, Dave
- Parsons, David
- Rowland, Rob
- Tory, T.A.
