= Mwamba RFC =

Kenyan rugby union club

(Kenya) Mwamba Rugby Football Club
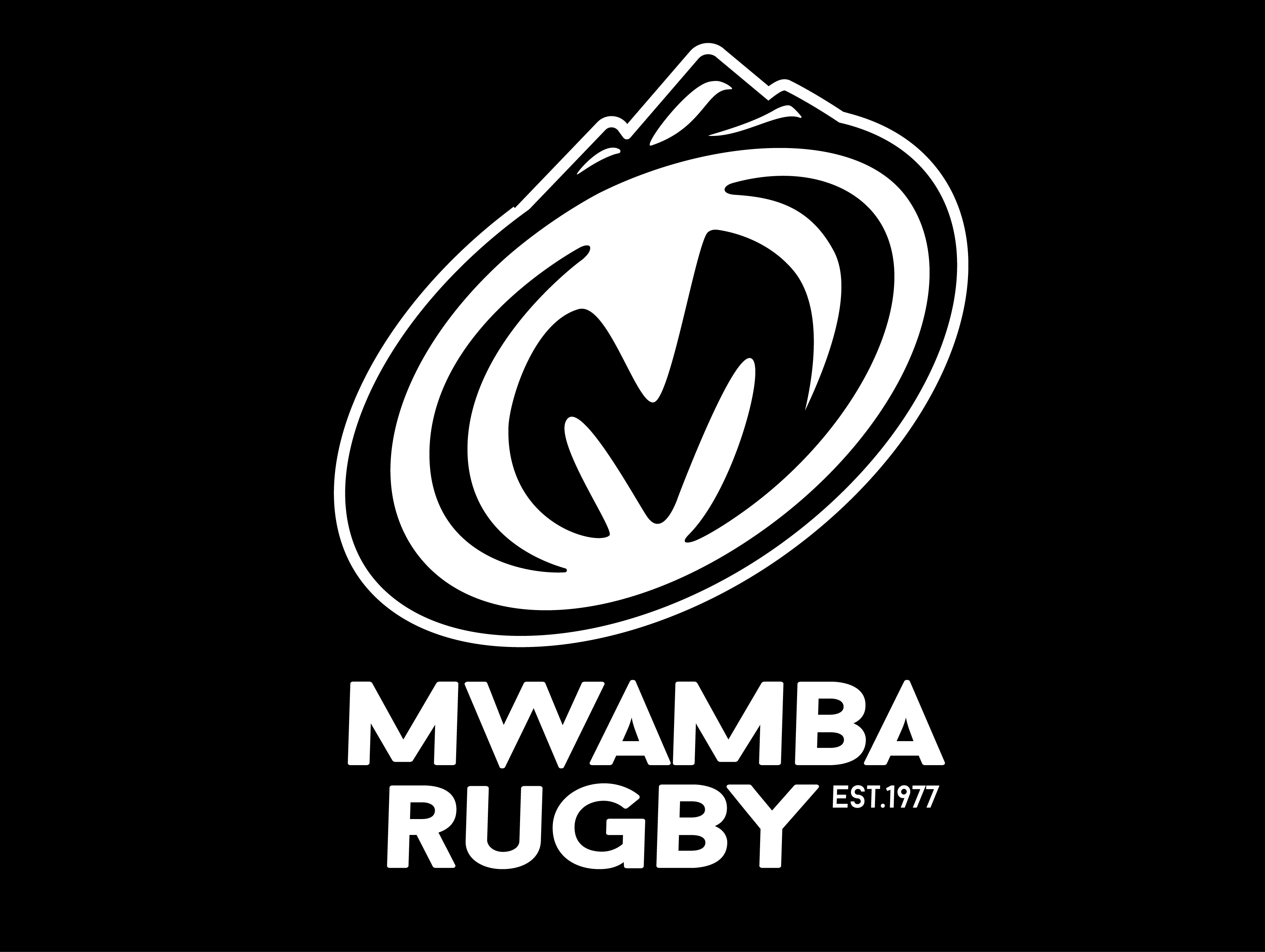
- Full name: Mwamba Rugby Football Club
- Union: Kenya Rugby Football Union
- Founded: 1977
- Location: Nairobi, Kenya
- Region: Nairobi Province
- Ground(s): 2,000-capacity Nairobi Railway Club Stadium
- Chairman: George Mbaye
- Coach(es): Kevin Wambua (Kenya)
- Captain(s): Felix Otieno (Kenya)
- League(s): Kenya Cup
Team kit

Official website
- www.mwambarugby.com

Mwamba Rugby Football Club, (Known as Stanbic Mwamba RFC for sponsorship purposes), is a Kenyan rugby union club based in Nairobi. The club was founded in 1977 with the aim of promoting rugby union among indigenous Kenyans at a time when the sport of rugby was still de facto a preserve of whites in Kenya.

The word “Mwamba” is Swahili for “rock" or "boulder”, which signifies stability in performances in the local leagues, firmness in the desire to nurture local talent, and consistency in the tenacious commitment to keeping alive the dreams of its founders.

Since formation the club has played at the Nairobi Railway Club next to Uhuru Park. Mwamba RFC competes in the Kenya Cup, the highest-level rugby competition in Kenya.

== Notable players ==
- Edward Rombo
- Collins Injera
- Humphrey Kayange
- Dennis Ombachi
