= Nondescripts RFC =

Kenyan rugby union team

(Kenya) Nondescripts
- Full name: Nondescripts Rugby Football Club
- Union: Kenya Rugby Football Union
- Nickname: Nondies
- Founded: 1923; 103 years ago
- Location: Nairobi, Kenya
- Region: Nairobi Province
- Ground(s): Ngong Race Course, Jockey Club Kenya, 5,000 capacity
- Chairman: (Kenya) Auka Gecheo
- Coach: (Kenya) Callum Oliver
- Captain: (Kenya) Fidel Oloo "Baboon"
- League: Kenya Cup
Team kit

Official website
- nondies.co.ke

Nondescripts Rugby Football Club (also known as Nondies) is a Kenyan rugby club based in Nairobi. The club is the oldest in Kenya, and was founded in 1923 after the splitting of the Nairobi rugby club. The club 1st XV compete in the Kenya Cup, while the 2nd XV compete in the Eric Shirley Shield. At the end of the now-defunct Nairobi District Championship, they had the most wins with 19. The Nondescripts have a long-lasting history with the social rugby team Les Gaulois, a French-initiated team.

== Notable players ==
=== Kenya 7's ===
- Biko Adema
- Benedict Nyambu
- Oscar Dennis
- Ken Moseti
- Gray Cullen
- Charles Kanyi
- Alvin Marube
- Fidens Tony
- Benson Salem adoyo

=== Kenya XV ===
- Charles Kanyi
- Mike Aung
- Jay Williams
- Bobby Oyugi
- Gray Cullen
- Ronnie Mwenesi
- Sospeter Nyagwa

==== Other key 1st XV players ====
- Gray Cullen
- Moses Wanyaga
- Kanyi Gitonga
- Charles Kanyi
- Anthony Shihemi
- Alan Hicks
- Mike Aung
- Michael Kimani
- Auka Gecheo
- Shaka Kwach
- Wesley Odhiambo
- Thomas Opiyo
- Joseph Wachira
- Clive Akello
- George Kanyi
- Madi Jimba Yahya
- Cedric Odera
- kelvin sheunda
- francis Mutuku
- Ombachi E Ondari
- Daniel Okito
- Alvyn Marube
- Nyaenya Moseti
