= Kenya Rugby Union =

Governing body for rugby union in Kenya

- Sport: Rugby union
- Founded: 1970
- Rugby Afrique affiliation: 1986 (founder member)
- President: Alexander Mutai
- CEO: Thomas Odundo
- Men's coach: Jerome Paarwater
- Women's coach: Dennis "Ironman" Mwanja Kolia
- Sevens coach: Kevin "Bling" Wambua
- Website: www.kru.co.ke

Kenya Rugby Union (KRU) is the governing body for rugby union in Kenya. It was founded in 1970 and is affiliated to Rugby Africa and the international governing body World Rugby.

KRU is responsible for the running of the Kenya national rugby union team, domestic club and school rugby competitions. The union shares a home ground, the RFUEA Ground in Nairobi, with Kenya Harlequin.

== Origins ==
The Rugby Football Union of Kenya (RFU-K) was initially founded in August 1921 and became operational in 1923 with the formation of the first Nairobi clubs, Nondescripts RFC and Harlequin RFC. In 1953 RFU-K was joined by the rugby unions of Tanganyika and Uganda to form the Rugby Football Union of East Africa (RFUEA) in representing the colonies of British East Africa. RFU-K was dissolved in 1956, with already existing district unions dealing directly with RFUEA.

In 1970, the decision was made to merge the district unions and form the Kenya Rugby Football Union (KRFU) under the umbrella of the RFUEA.
