= East Africa rugby union team =

East Africa
- Unions: Rugby Football Union of East Africa; Kenya Rugby Football Union; Tanzania Rugby Football Union; Uganda Rugby Football Union
- Nickname: Tuskers (on tour only)
- Founded: 7 January 1950
Team kit

First international
- East Africa 12 – 39 British Lions (28 September 1955)

Largest win
- Zambian Clubs XV 4 – 31 East Africa (2 September 1975)

Largest defeat
- (East Africa Protectorate) East Africa 0 – 50 British Lions (28 August 1962)

Established in 1950, the East Africa rugby union team is a multi-national rugby union team drawing players from Kenya, Uganda and Tanzania; however, the vast majority of these came from Kenya, which has traditionally been the strongest rugby playing nation in the region. The team has played against incoming international, representative and club touring sides and it conducted seven tours between 1954 and 1982.

Though East Africa do play under the Tuskers nickname, it is used exclusively when they are on tour; for all matches played at home they are referred to as East Africa. This tradition has come into being because the team had existed for five years by the time of the first external tour in 1954 when the touring side adopted the Tuskers moniker, as have all subsequent tours.

For 30 years, the team lay dormant, though the Rugby Football Union of East Africa (RFUEA) continued to exist as the governing body of rugby within the three countries, until (on 9 July 2011 at an event at the RFUEA Ground) the team was re-launched by Mwangi Muthee (Chairman of the Kenya Rugby Football Union), William Blick (President of the Uganda Rugby Union), George Kariuki (Rugby Football Union of East Africa) and John Lloyd (Rugby Patrons Society). The team played its first fixture in almost exactly 30 years against England Counties XV at the RFUEA grounds in early June 2012.

== Early history ==
The first union in British East Africa was the Rugby Football Union of Kenya (RFU-K), founded in August 1921; it was responsible for the administration of the game throughout Kenya, Uganda and Tanganyika which it carried out through various district sub-unions throughout the region. Several universities and Royal Navy ships sent teams to tour East Africa during this period. The Combined South African Universities toured in 1929. In 1935, Danie Craven captained Stellenbosch University on a tour of the region; though none of these encounters included a match against a representative East Africa team.

The first representative team called East Africa are recorded facing the Cape Town University team that toured the region in late 1949 early 1950. Three matches were played in January 1950, East Africa losing each encounter. At this time, the East Africa team represented the colonies of British East Africa (Kenya Colony, Tanganyika and Uganda Protectorate) and the players were predominantly white settlers. (it was not until the 1960s that rugby's popularity spread and indigenous players started to take up the game; with time the East African team has seen a commensurate increase in the numbers of black players being selected).

In 1953, the Rugby Football Union of East Africa (RFUEA) was created in order to take over the mantle as the umbrella organisation for rugby in the region. The creation of the RFUEA allowed for the formation of the Tanganyika Rugby Football Union (TRFU) in 1954 and Uganda Rugby Football Union (URFU) in 1955. Each of these were essentially a sub-union of the RFUEA much as the district unions in Kenya were, so the RFU-K was dissolved in 1956 allowing the already existing district unions to deal directly with the RFUEA.

The formation of the RFUEA was just in time for the East Africa representative side's first tour, the First Tuskers Tour of the Copperbelt in 1954. It also gave the team slightly more official status though little, if anything, had changed with regard to the management of the team. Tuskers tours to the Copperbelt became somewhat of a tradition, six of the eight Tuskers tours have been to this rugby stronghold in southern Africa; a region that can provide an appropriate level of opposition and at a distance that does not strain the purse-strings of the players and unions alike. The only Tuskers tours not to the Copperbelt were to England (1966) and Ireland (1972).

A year after the first tour, East Africa faced the British Lions in the first game played at the recently constructed headquarters of East African rugby, the RFUEA Ground and during the next six years welcomed other touring sides from the United Kingdom and South Africa including the Barbarians and South Africa and several prestigious university and military teams.

The Second Tuskers Tour took place in 1962 and again East Africa's first game at home after returning from a tour was against the British Lions. Between 1963 and 1966 several clubs and universities toured East Africa and played against the full representative side including, in 1964, Wales. Tours from South Africa were no longer welcomed as Kenya, Tanzania and Uganda were participating in the boycott protesting the apartheid regime in that country.

In the six years between the Third (1966) and Fourth (1972) Tuskers tours, 15 high-profile clubs from the United Kingdom and the Irish Republic toured the region and played matches against East Africa, including Richmond FC, Blackheath FC, Harlequins FC and Blackrock College RFC, several touring twice in those year.

After the fifth Tuskers tour, there was only one more British club to visit East Africa because the Rugby Football Union refused to participate in the anti-apartheid boycott of South Africa; as a result clubs administered by the RFU were no longer welcome. It is during this period that East Africa saw an increase in touring sides from France (including ACBB, Club Sportif Municipal (CSM) Clamart and ASCO ONERA), Italy (Including Rugby Roma Olimpic), Argentina (Old Georgians and various islands in the Indian Ocean (Réunion and Mauritius).

== Major Internationals ==
When the British Lions went to South Africa for their 1955 and 1962 tours, they played East Africa in Nairobi on the return legs of their journeys. The Lions won both of these games, 39–12 and 50–0 respectively. The 1955 game was East Africa's first international and also saw the official opening of the team's home stadium, the RFUEA Ground, then called the Ngong Road Ground.

In 1958, East Africa hosted the Barbarians on their first tour of Africa. The Barbarians, managed by Brigadier Glyn Hughes and captained by Scotland's Jim Greenwood, took in six matches, the first five all played in South Africa, but the final match of the tour was against East Africa. The game was played on 28 May, with the Barbarians winning 58–12, Tony O'Reilly scoring seven tries.

East Africa would also play against South Africa in 1961 (losing 39–0), and Wales on their 1964 tour of Africa. Wales' game, held at the RFUEA Ground, Nairobi, on 12 May 1964, was the first time that they had played a match outside of Europe and therefore also their first in the Southern Hemisphere, albeit a mere hundred miles from the Equator. Wales won the match, 26–8.

Prior to the introduction of standard numbering systems, many teams would wear numbers (or in the case of Bristol RFC and Leicester FC, letters) in a different order to that known today. The first set of East African jerseys was numbered from fullback (1) to scrum-half (7) followed by loosehead prop (8) to Number-8 (15). It must also be remembered that prior to the innovation, by Sherborne School,^{[a]} in the 1960s of using the hooker to throw the ball into the line-out, this was the job of the winger. Thus there are photos of East African matches with the unusual combination of a winger, numbered 2 or 5, throwing in to a line of eight forwards, numbered 8 to 15.

=== British Lions 1955 ===
Five and a half years after their first match against the University of Cape Town, East Africa played their first international match against the British Lions, as they returned home from their 1955 tour of South Africa.

The Rugby Football Union of East Africa (RFUEA) took the opportunity of the 1955 match to invite the Lions manager (J.A.E. Siggins) to officially open their newly built national stadium, the RFUEA Ground (then called the Ngong Road Ground) prior to kick-off. The capacity crowd of 6000 was treated to a magnificent display of running handling rugby that had characterised the tourists' games in South Africa.

According to the match programme, East Africa fielded seven players who were winning their first cap, Brodziak, Chambers, Darroch, MacLean, Meintjes, Tippett and Wheeler. In addition East Africa selected two reserves and the Lions one; although substitutions were not allowed it was usual to select reserves at this time in case a player did not arrive on time or was unable to start the match. The match programme also states that Frank Sykes (Northampton & England), Robin Roe (Lansdowne & Ireland) and Tom Reid (Garryowen & Ireland) had been selected to play this match, but the Lions' archives suggest that ultimately they did not. It appears that the reserve Bryn Meredith and Billy Williams (who had been assigned as the Lions touch-judge) were called upon to start in place of Roe and R.H. Williams while D.G.S. Baker was required to fill in for Sykes. East Africa took the field as advertised in the programme.

One of the contemporary match reports was written by Tony Coxall, a 13-year-old pupil from Arusha School in Tanzania who attended the match as part of a school trip in which twenty boys undertook the five-and-a-half-hour, 170 miles (270 km) journey to Nairobi in a 1.5 ton lorry. In this report it is stated that the Lions scored two tries before East Africa answered with a penalty and that at half time the score was 6–19. It also states that the seats cost 1 shilling each and that the crowd were entertained by the band of the Royal Irish Fusiliers at half-time.

As was usual for touring teams visiting East Africa during the 1950s, 1960s and 1970s, the Lions were given private hospitality as opposed to staying in hotels. Cliff Morgan, Haydn Morris and Gareth Griffiths (all players with Cardiff RFC) stayed with Mr. and Mrs. Arthur "Pat" Bryant, who had played for Cardiff prior to World War I, and who was an official of the East African Rugby Union. He had refereed for the RFUEA (in his blue and black Cardiff jersey) until his retirement at about 63 years of age. The tourists also encountered another former Cardiff player from the 1940s, Captain Howell Loveluck who was in Kenya as chaplain to the British Forces stationed there at the time of the Mau Mau Uprising.

There is a frequently repeated urban legend that Idi Amin (later to become the infamous military dictator of Uganda) was selected as a replacement by East Africa for their match against the 1955 British Lions. The story is entirely unfounded, he does not appear on the team list or in the team photograph and replacements were first introduced into international rugby 13 years after this event is supposed to have taken place. Mike Gibson of Ireland is generally recognised as being the first ever replacement in a rugby union match (he came on for the injured Barry John during the first test in Pretoria on the 1968 British Lions tour to South Africa). The first replacement for East Africa was Douglas "Dougie" Hamilton who came on in the 1968 match versus Queen's University (Belfast) R.F.C.

Wednesday 28 September 1955
EAT (UTC+3)

East Africa	12–39	British Lions
Try: None; Con: None; Pen: R. Chambers (3); Drop: R. Chambers (1)		Try: A. Smith (5), C. Pedlow (2), E. Michie (1), P. Quinn (1), C. Morgan (1), G. Griffiths (1); Con: Pedlow (3); Pen: None; Drop: None

Ngong Road Ground, Nairobi, Kenya
Attendance: 6000
Referee: Andrew G. Clark
Touch judge:
Touch judge: A.K. "Ken" Fyfe

Teams

Pos.	No.	Player	Club	Home union
FB	1	V. Fieros	Arusha RFC	Tanganyika Territory
LW	2	D. Darroch	Nondescripts RFC	Kenya Colony
LC	3	D. Brodziak	Nakuru RFC	Kenya Colony
RC	4	G.P. Meintjes	Eldoret RFC and Kenya Regiment	Kenya Colony
RW	5	E.A. Bristow	Nondescripts RFC	Kenya Colony
FH	6	R.H. Chambers	Tanga RFC	Tanganyika Territory
SH	7	C. Kimmins	Gloucestershire Regiment	Kenya Colony
Forwards:
	8	W.W. Ingram	Londiani RFC	Kenya Colony
	9	J.D. Humphreys	Nondescripts RFC and Kenya Regiment	Kenya Colony
	10	R.J. Kavanagh	Dar-es-Salaam RFC	Tanganyika Territory
	11	E. Evans	Londiani RFC	Kenya Colony
	12	A.I. McLean	Nondescripts RFC	Kenya Colony
	13	D.S. Reynolds	Uganda Kobs RFC and Kenya Regiment	Uganda Protectorate
	14	A.M. Tippett	Rifle Brigade	Kenya Colony
	15	P.J.F. Wheeler (c)	Cambridge and Londiani RFC	Kenya Colony
Reserves:
	16	H.C. Plough	Kenya Regiment and Mombasa RFC	Kenya Colony
	17	A. Thorpe	Kenya Police RFC and Eldoret RFC	Kenya Colony

Pos.	No.	Player	Club	Home union
FB	1	Doug G.S. Baker	Old Merchant Taylors' FC	England
LW	23	Arthur R. Smith	Cambridge University	Scotland
LC	19	James Patrick Quinn	New Brighton FC	England
RC	34	Gareth M. Griffiths	Cardiff RFC	Wales
RW	18	A. Cecil Pedlow	Queen's University RFC	Ireland
FH	15	Cliff I. Morgan	Cardiff RFC	Wales
SH	9	Trevor Lloyd	Maesteg RFC	Wales
Forwards:
	28	W.O.G. "Billy" Williams	Swansea RFC	Wales
	11	B.V. "Bryn" Meredith	Newport RFC	Wales
	5	Tom Elliot	Gala RFC	Scotland
	30	Rhys H. Williams	Llanelli RFC	Wales
	14	Ernie J.S. Michie	Aberdeen University RFC	Scotland
	31	D.S. "Tug" Wilson	Metropolitan Police RFC	England
	26	R.C.C. "Clem" Thomas	Swansea RFC	Wales
	27	Robin H. Thompson (c)	Instonians RFC	Ireland

=== Barbarian F.C. 1958 ===
The Barbarians, managed by Brigadier HL Glyn-Hughes and H Waddell, had just completed a successful tour of South Africa and stopped off in Nairobi on their way home. Members of this team who had previously visited Nairobi with the 1955 Lions were RH Williams, AJF O'Reilly, REG Jeeps, HF McLeod, JT Greenwood, CI Morgan, AR Smith and AC Pedlow. RH Davies had previously toured with the 1957 Combined (Oxford and Cambridge) Universities side.

The match was played before a capacity crowd in the late afternoon to early evening on a Wednesday; the papers reported that the colony's Legislative Council (Legco.) had adjourned early that day before cryptically referring to the Barbarian game later in the same paragraph by way of an oblique explanation. The visitors playing champagne rugby in the highest traditions of their club. Tony O'Reilly scored seven tries, no doubt making up for the fact that he had been injured and unable to play when he had come to Nairobi with the Lions three years earlier. East Africa's first try was scored by RN Angus of Kenya Harlequins, the first scored by East Africa on their Ngong Road ground.

Wednesday 28 May 1958
EAT (UTC+3)

East Africa	12–52	Barbarian F.C.
Try: Angus; Marshall; Con: None; Pen: Kennedy; Drop: Tory		Try: O'Reilly (7); McLeod; Jones (3); Waddell; Thomas; Pedlow; Con: McLeod; Jones (2); Thomas (2); Pen: None; Drop: None

Ngong Road Ground, Nairobi, Kenya
Attendance: 6000
Referee: A.K. Fyfe

Team Lists

EAST AFRICA
Pos.	^{[c]}	Player	Club	Home Union
FB	1	R.L. Morgan	Kenya Police RFC	Tanganyika Territory
RW	2	H.A. Adams	Impala RFC	Kenya Colony
OC	3	D.W. Marshall	Kenya Police RFC	Kenya Colony
IC	4	G.P. Meintjes	Eldoret RFC	Kenya Colony
LW	5	D. Darroch	Nakuru RFC	Kenya Colony
FH	6	T.A. Tory	Impala RFC	Kenya Colony
SH	7	L.P Murray	Moshi RFC	Tanganyika Territory
LP	8	K. Duncan	Kenya Harlequins	Kenya Colony
HK	9	R.N. Angus	Kenya Harlequins	Kenya Colony
TP	10	J.J. Steel	Arusha RFC	Tanganyika Territory
LL	11	K.V. Oulton	Nakuru RFC	Kenya Colony
RL	12	A.I. McLean (c)	Nondescripts RFC	Kenya Colony
OF	13	H.B. Isherwood	Impala RFC	Kenya Colony
BF	14	D.B. Kennedy	Nakuru RFC	Kenya Colony
N8	15	E. Evans	Kitale RFC	Kenya Colony

BARBARIANS
		Player	Club	Home Union
FB	15	Robin W.T. Chisholm		Scotland
RW	14	A.J.F. Tony O'Reilly		Ireland
OC	13	Brian J. Jones		Newport RFC
IC	12	Malcolm Thomas		Wales
LW	11	A. Cecil Pedlow		Ireland
FH	10	Cliff I. Morgan		Wales
SH	9	Gordon H. Waddell		Scotland
LP	1	Hugh F. McLeod		Scotland
HK	2	Norman Bruce		Scotland
TP	3	Ron Jacobs		England
LL	4	W.R.D. Roddy Evans		Wales
RL	5	Rhys H. Williams		Wales
BF	6	Haydn Morgan		Wales
OF	7	Stephen H. Wilcock		Oxford University RFC
N8	8	Jim T. Greenwood (c)		Scotland

=== Springboks 1961 ===
In 1960–1961, the Springboks undertook a four-month tour of the United Kingdom and France, winning all their 43 matches except for a 0–0 draw against France and a 6–0 defeat by the Barbarians at Cardiff in what is often inaccurately listed as the final match of that tour. They left London on Wednesday 22 February by air, landing in Nairobi for a four-day stopover in Kenya on their way back to Johannesburg and, on Saturday 25 February 1961, they played East Africa. This was the only meeting between these teams, quite possibly the first match between South Africa and another African "nation", but unequivocally the true last match of the tour.

The final score was 39–0, the half-time score having been 15–0 with South Africa piling on a further 21 points within a quarter of an hour of the beginning of the second half, though the flood gates were closed for the rest of the match with the Springboks then only scoring once more. Johannes "Hannes" Botha (a flanker) and Gideon "Giepie" Wentzel (a full-back) played out of position.

25 February 1961
EAT (UTC+3)

East Africa	0–39	South Africa

Ngong Road Ground, Nairobi, Kenya
Referee: Mr W S Thomas (KRRS)

Team Lists

EAST AFRICA
	^{[c]}	Player	Club	Home Union
FB	1	R Sudbury
RW	2	Chris C. Young (c)	Nakuru RFC	Kenya Colony
OC	3	B T Wigley
IC	4	A R Ward
LW	5	Nick G Patterson	Kericho RFC	Kenya Colony
FH	6	J R Rowland
SH	7	T I N "Tiny" Thomas
LP	8	G Thom Thorpe	Eldoret RFC	Kenya Colony
HK	9	F A Rob Bwye	Impala RFC	Kenya Colony
TP	10	W S Baird
LL	11	D S "Lofty" Reynolds	Uganda Kobs RFC and Kenya Regiment	Uganda Protectorate
RL	12	C H Elphick
OF	13	B R Granville-Ross	Nondscripts RFC	Kenya Colony
BF	14	F S Hewitt
N8	15	H Kruger	Eldoret RFC	Kenya Colony

SOUTH AFRICA
		Player	Province	Home Union
FB	15	Johannes P F Botha	Northern Transvaal	South Africa
RW	14	Jan P Engelbrecht	Western Province	South Africa
OC	13	Gideon J Wentzel	Eastern Province	South Africa
IC	12	Alexander I Kirkpatrick	Free State	South Africa
LW	11	Ben-Piet van Zyl	Western Province	South Africa
FH	10	Keith Oxlee	Natal	South Africa
SH	9	Pieter-de-Waal Uys	Northern Transvaal	South Africa
LP	1	Stephanus P Kuhn	Transvaal	South Africa
HK	2	Robert Johns	Western Province	South Africa
TP	3	Johannes L Myburgh	Northern Transvaal	South Africa
LL	4	Avril S Malan (c)	Transvaal	South Africa
RL	5	Hendrik S van der Merwe	Northern Transvaal	South Africa
BF	6	Pieter J van Zyl	Boland	South Africa
OF	7	Douglas J Hopwood	Western Province	South Africa
N8	8	Frederic C H du Preez	Northern Transvaal	South Africa

=== British Lions 1962 ===
Almost exactly seven years after hosting the 1955 Lions, East Africa faced the Lions again on the same ground, this time as they were returning from their 1962 tour to South Africa. At half time the score was 0 – 29

Tuesday 28 August 1962
17:15 EAT (UTC+3)

East Africa	0–50	British Lions
Try: None; Con: None; Pen: None; Drop: None		Try: McBride (1); Kiernan (1); Jones (2); Brophy (3); Hunter (2); Sharp (1); Dee (1); Con: Kiernan (1); Hunter (2); Sharp (4); Pen: Sharp (1); Drop: None

Ngong Road Ground, Nairobi, Kenya
Attendance: 4000
Referee: D.G. Withey

Team Lists

EAST AFRICA
	^{[c]}	Player	Club	Home Union
FB	1	K. McGuinness	Kenya Harlequins	Kenya Colony
RW	2	W.R. Millar	Kericho RFC	Kenya Colony
OC	3	D. Atkinson
IC	4	J. Anderson
LW	5	G.N. Paterson	Kericho RFC	Kenya Colony
FH	6	Chris C. Young (c)	Nakuru RFC	Kenya Colony
SH	7	K O'Byrne	Kenya Harlequins	Kenya Colony
LP	8	M. Watson	Nondescripts RFC	Kenya Colony
HK	9	R Bwye	Impala RFC	Kenya Colony
TP	10	K Duncan	Kenya Harlequins	Kenya Colony
LL	11	Frank Lawson	Impala RFC	Kenya Colony
RL	12	R.B. Laing	Kenya Harlequins	Kenya Colony
OF	13	D. Young	Nakuru RFC	Kenya Colony
BF	14	Mike Andrews	Impala RFC	Kenya Colony
N8	15	D.S. Reynolds	Uganda Kobs RFC and Kenya Regiment	Uganda Protectorate

BRITISH LIONS
		Player	Club	Home Union
FB	15	Tom Kiernan		Ireland
RW	14	Niall Brophy		Ireland
OC	13	Ken Jones		Wales
IC	12	John Dee		England
LW	11	Dewi Bebb		Wales
FH	10	Richard Sharp		England
SH	9	Tony O'Conner		Wales
LP	1	Kingsley Jones		Wales
HK	2	Hal Godwin		England
TP	3	David Rollo		Scotland
LL	4	Willie John McBride		Ireland
RL	5	Keith Rowlands		Wales
BF	6	Haydn Morgan		Wales
OF	7	Raymond Hunter		Ireland
N8	8	Mike Campbell-Lamerton (c)		Scotland

=== Wales 1964 ===
In 1964, the Welsh national team undertook their first overseas tour, a five-match tour of Africa. They left London on Sunday 10 May flying to Nairobi, arriving on Monday morning. They played their first ever match outside Europe (and thus their first match in the Southern Hemisphere) against East Africa on Tuesday 12 May, winning 26–8, before flying to Cape Town on Wednesday.

Welsh captain Clive Rowlands dictated the patterns of play and orchestrated many of the Welsh moves. Dewi Bebb snatched his try at a chance from a lineout three yards from the line and dived over before the opposition could lay a finger on him. The East African team fought valiantly and often caused the visitors defence problems with strong surging runs; their star player was Eric Weaver a Welshman serving in Nairobi with the RAF, he had previously played professional football with Swindon Town. The Welsh fly-half in this match (Marsden Young) had not been – and was not subsequently – capped by Wales. As this match was not regarded as a full test by the Welsh Rugby Union, so this player does not appear on the List of Wales national rugby union players.

The remaining four matches of the tour were in South Africa, who were celebrating the 75th anniversary of the South African Rugby Board. The first of these was played on 19 May against Boland at Wellington which they won 17–6. The test-match against South Africa, played at King's Park, Durban on 23 May, was lost 3–24. The final two games were played on 27 May and 30 May against Northern Transvaal at Pretoria (lost 9–22) and the Orange Free State at Bloemfontein (won 14–6).

It was the lack of success experienced by the team on this tour that is credited with sparking the Welsh Rugby Union into action, appointing their first national coach and reaping the rewards with their fabled teams of the 1970s.

Tuesday 12 May 1964
17:00 EAT (UTC+3)

East Africa	8–26	Wales
Try: Andrews(1); Con: Young (1); Pen: Young (1)		Try: Bebb (1); Dawes (1); Jones (2); Gale (1); Con: Bradshaw (4); Pen: Bradshaw (1)

Ngong Road Ground, Nairobi, Kenya
Attendance: 6000
Referee: G.E. Neville (Kenya R.R.S)
Touch Judge M.I. Parker

Team Lists

EAST AFRICA
	^{[c]}	Player	Club	Home Union
FB	1	W. Kennedy	Kenya Police RFC	Kenya
RW	2	T. Tory	Nondescripts RFC	Kenya
OC	3	C.J.C. Irvine	Kenya Harlequins	Kenya
IC	4	C.C. Young	Nakuru RFC	Kenya
LW	5	E. Weaver	RAF	Kenya
FH	6	B.K. McGuinness	Kenya Harlequins	Kenya
SH	7	K.F. O'Byrne	Kenya Harlequins	Kenya
LP	8	K.I. Duncan	Kenya Harlequins	Kenya
HK	9	F.A.R. Bwye	Impala RFC	Kenya
TP	10	B. Shorter	Impala RFC	Kenya
LL	11	D.S. Reynolds	Nakuru RFC	Kenya
RL	12	A. Russell	Dar es Salaam	Tanzania
OF	13	G. Barbour	Kitale RFC	Kenya
BF	14	R.B. Laing (c)	Kenya Harlequins	Kenya
N8	15	Mike Andrews	Impala RFC	Kenya

WALES
		Player	Club	Home Union
FB	8	G. T. R. Hodgson	Neath RFC	Wales
RW	1	D. I. Bebb	Swansea RFC	Wales
OC	2	Keith Bradshaw	Bridgend RFC	Wales
IC	5	S. J. Dawes	London Welsh	Wales
LW	10	D. K. Jones	London Welsh	Wales
FH	24	J. M. Young	Bridgend RFC	Wales
SH	18	D. C. T. Rowlands (c)	Pontypool RFC	Wales
LP	23	D. Williams	Ebbw Vale RFC	Wales
HK	6	Norman R. Gale	Llanelli RFC	Wales
TP	3	Len Cunningham	Aberavon RFC	Wales
LL	15	B. E. V. Price	Newport RFC	Wales
RL	19	Brian E. Thomas	Neath RFC	Wales
BF	16	G. J. Prothero	Bridgend RFC	Wales
OF	12	J. Mantle	Loughborough and Newport RFC	Wales
N8	7	David John Hayward	Cardiff RFC	Wales

== Tuskers tours ==
Emblem used by the East Africa rugby union team when on tour as the Tuskers

The Tuskers is the nickname of the East Africa rugby union team but it is used exclusively when they are on tour. In all matches played at home they are referred to as East Africa. By the time of the first Tuskers tour in 1954, East Africa had played three matches, all against the touring University of Cape Town team from South Africa, and the RFUEA badge had been adopted. When their first tour was being organised a few uncharitable nicknames were suggested for the team and thus the Tuskers moniker was quickly adopted and an appropriate emblem designed.

=== First Tuskers Copperbelt Tour 1954 ===
The idea of an East African rugby touring team was first broached while the Kenya athletics team was visiting the Northern Rhodesia (now Zambia) in 1953. The manager of that team was Archie Evans, a member of the Nondescripts RFC in Nairobi and he was able to communicate this proposal to the fledgling Rugby Football Union of East Africa (RFUEA). The tour took several months to organise, the process being hindered by the postal delays between the RFUEA, the Northern Rhodesian Rugby Union and its subsidiary, the Northern Rhodesian Congo Border Rugby Union. It was eventually decided that the latter of these would host the tour and permissions were sought from the respective governing bodies (the South African Rugby Board for Rhodesia and the Rugby Football Union in London for East Africa).

The delays during the planning meant that there was no time to stage trials. Instead the recently played first ever match between Kenya and Tanganyika was used to select the majority of the players that were to go on the tour. Arrangements were finalised just two weeks before departure; unfortunately one of the best players East Africa ever produced, A.I. McLean, was unable to take part as the hastily arranged tour coincided with his wedding. Most of the organisational work had been carried out by C.F. Schermbrucker (acting President of the RFUEA), Owen Wheeler (Hon Secretary RFUEA) and Mr. R.E. Luyt who had previously lived and played rugby in the Copperbelt.

The team, managed by A.K. Fyfe and Andrew G. Clark, left by air from Nairobi West on 17 August 1954. Played 8 matches, won 7 and lost 1 (to the Copperbelt XV).

First Tuskers Squad

Player		Position	Home union	Club	Notes
Fieros, Vic	15	Fullback	Tanganyika Territory	Arusha RFC	Played for Prince of Wales School, Natal University, Tanganyika (1954) and East Africa (1951)
Mabbs, M.R.	14	Wing	Kenya Colony	Kenya Harlequins	Played for Christ's Hospital, Public School Wanderers and Old Blues RFC
Notley, Nigel D.	14	Wing	Kenya Colony	Army	Played for Blackheath F.C. and Devon
Bristow, Eddie A.	11	Wing	Kenya Colony	Nondescripts RFC	Played for King's Bruton, Durham University and Rosslyn Park F.C.
Millar, W.R.	11	Wing	Kenya Colony	Kenya Regiment	Also played for the Duke of York School
Grassie, D.M.	13	Outside centre	Kenya Colony	Army	Played for Perthshire Academicals
Walker, Des	12	Inside centre	Kenya Colony	Army	Also played for Durham University, Northumberland (1952) and Kenya (1954)
Todd, J.R. Jimmy (c)	10	Fly-half	Kenya Colony	Londiani RFC	Played for Queen's University (Belfast) R.F.C., Cambridge University LX Club, London Irish, East Africa (1950–51), and Kenya (1954)
Wheeler, O.G.	9	Scrum-half	Kenya Colony	Kenya Harlequins	Played for Nuneaton RFC, Warwickshire County and captained Kenya (1954)
Valentine, R. John H.	9	Scrum-half	Kenya Colony	Army	Played for London Scottish and captained Scottish Public Schools (1952)
Kavanagh, R.	1	Prop	Tanganyika Territory	Dar es Salaam RFC	Played for Birmingham RFC, Midland Counties XV, captained Coast Province (1953) and Tanganyika (1954)
Pollastri, R.	3	Prop	Kenya Colony	Nakuru	Played for West Kenya Province and Kenya (1954)
Richardson, T.E.	2	Hooker	Uganda Protectorate	Nile RFC	Captained Queens' College, Cambridge and capped for Army versus Royal Navy and France
Tanner, John W.	2	Hooker	Kenya Colony	Kenya Harlequins	Played for Clifton RFC, Waterloo R.F.C., Lancashire County XV and Kenya (1954)
Reynolds, D.S. Lofty	4	Lock	Kenya Colony	Kenya Regiment	Played for Cheltenham College
Edgecombe, G.J.B.	4	Lock	Kenya Colony	Army	Played for English Public Schools, London Irish, Barbarians and captained RMA Sandhurst
Coughlan, Charles J. (vc)	5	Lock	Kenya Colony	Kenya Harlequins	Played for University College Dublin, Truro RFC, and Kenya (1954)
Evans, Eddie	6	Flanker	Kenya Colony	Kitale RFC	Played for Keswick RFC, Manchester University, Loughborough College, Combined English Universities, Bedford RFC and the County of Cumberland
Fletcher, H.	6	Flanker	Kenya Colony	Kitale	Captained Kitale (1953–54), played for East Africa (1950–51) and Kenya (1954)
Thomas, W.K.L.	7	Flanker	Kenya Colony	Dodoma RFC	Was a Welsh Schools trialist whilst at Gowerton Grammar School, played for the University of London and Eastern Command
Kirk, J.	8	Number eight	Kenya Colony	Kenya Harlequins	Played for Prince of Wales School, Railway Club, Paignton RFC and Kenya (1954)
Humphreys, J.	8	Number eight	Kenya Colony	Kenya Regiment	Played for Nondescripts RFC, East Africa Command, Queen's College, Taunton

=== Second Tuskers Copperbelt Tour 1962 ===
In 1962, the Tuskers, captained By Chris Young, toured the Copperbelt region of Northern Rhodesia (now Zambia) for the second time. They played seven matches winning two; those played against Ndola and Mufulira.

Second Tuskers Squad

Player		Position	Home union	Club	Notes
Mike Andrews	8	Number eight	Kenya Colony	Impala RFC	
Gordon Bell			Kenya Colony	Impala RFC	
Peter Blunt			Kenya Colony	Impala RFC	
Rob Bwye	2	Hooker	Kenya Colony	Impala RFC	
Ted Darrell			Kenya Colony	Kenya Harlequins	
Ken Duncan			Kenya Colony	Kenya Harlequins	
Brian Granville-Ross	6, 7	Flanker	Kenya Colony	Nondescripts RFC	
Dirk Klynsmith			Uganda Protectorate	Kampala RFC	
Martin Konstant			Kenya Colony	Impala RFC	
Nan Kruger	4, 5	Lock	Kenya Colony	Eldoret RFC	
Balfour Laing			Kenya Colony	Kenya Harlequins	
Willie Law			Kenya Colony	Nakuru RFC	
Frank Lawson			Tanganyika Territory	Dar es Salaam RFC	
Keith McGuinness			Kenya Colony	Kenya Harlequins	
Kevin O'Byrne	9	Scrum-half	Kenya Colony	Kenya Harlequins	
Nick Patterson	11, 14	Wing	Kenya Colony	Kericho RFC	
Trevor Peregrine			Tanganyika Territory	Arusha RFC	
Simon Lofty Reynolds	4, 5	Lock	Kenya Colony	Nakuru RFC	
A.C. Freddie Schwentafsky	11, 14	Wing	Kenya Colony	Prince of Wales School	Had been on tour with Combined Kenya Schools XV in the Copperbelt and stayed behind to join the Tuskers.
Andrew Tainsh	6, 7	Flanker	Kenya Colony	Nandi Bears RFC	
Terry Tory			Kenya Colony	Nondescripts RFC	
Chris Young (c)	10, 11, 14	Fly-half, Wing	Kenya Colony	Nakuru RFC	
Joe Taylor		Tour Manager	Kenya Colony	Nondescripts RFC	

=== Third Tuskers England tour 1966 ===
In September 1966, the Third Tuskers toured England. Their captain was Brian Granville-Ross, their manager was Balf Laing, and their assistant manager was Peter Griffiths.

Played against Richmond F.C., Blackheath F.C., Anti-Assassins, Wilmslow RUFC, Vale of Lune RUFC, Harlequin F.C. and Fylde. All matches were lost.

=== Fourth Tuskers Ireland Tour 1972 ===
This tour took place in September 1972. The team played eight matches, winning three.

=== Fifth Tuskers Zambia Tour 1975 ===
Fifth Tuskers Squad

Player		Position	Home union	Club	Notes
Hamilton, Douglas "Dougie" (Tour Manager)	6	Flanker	Kenya	Kenya Harlequins F.C.	Played for RAF Coastal Command, Scorpions RFC, Kenya, East Africa and Sherborne RFC
Rowlands, Rob (Asst. Manager)	10	Fly-half	Kenya	Impala RFC	Played for Camborne RFC, Scorpions RFC, Kenya, Uganda and East Africa
Evans, Dicky (Captain)	12	Inside centre	Kenya	Nondescripts RFC	Played for Penzance and Newlyn RFC, Richmond F.C., Cornwall, Scorpions RFC, Kenya, Uganda and East Africa
Tarbit, John (Vice Captain)	8	Number eight	Tanzania	Dar es Salaam	Played for Gosforth RFC, Northumberland, Malawi and Scorpions RFC
Allison, John	1	Prop	Kenya	Kenya Harlequins F.C.	Also played for Scorpions RFC and Kenya
Brown, Tom	3	Prop	Kenya	Impala RFC	Played for Lusaka Sports Club and Jordanhill
Cashin, John	4	Lock	Kenya	Kenya Harlequins F.C.	Also played for Sussex University, Rosslyn Park F.C. and Scorpions RFC
Cobb, Andy	1	Prop	Kenya	Impala RFC	Played for Scorpions RFC, Kenya and East Africa
Davies, Gareth	2	Hooker	Kenya	Impala RFC	Played for Bangor University, Widnes RUFC North Wales and Bahamas
Evans, David	9	Scrum-half	Kenya	Nondescripts RFC	Played for Fettes College and Keswick RFC. David is the son of Eddie Evans who captained East Africa in 1957–58
Evans, Mike	7	Flanker	Kenya	Nondescripts RFC	Played for Madeley College RFC, Keswick RFC Scorpions RFC, Kenya and East Africa. Mike is David's brother.
Evans, Rod	8	Number eight	Kenya	Nondescripts RFC	Played for Carnegie College, Headingley RFC, Keswick RFC and Cumberland. Rod is cousin to David and Mike, and follows his father Archie and brother Pete by representing East Africa.
Granger-Brown, Kevin	11	Wing	Kenya	Nondescripts RFC	Also played for Scorpions RFC, Kenya and East Africa
Harrington, Peter	9	Scrum-half	Kenya	Kenya Harlequins F.C.	Played for London Irish and Scorpions
Hughes, David	13	Outside centre	Kenya	Thika Sports Club	Played for Scorpions RFC and Central Province (Kenya).
Hunter, Craig	4	Lock	Kenya	Kenya Harlequins F.C.	At 17, he is the youngest player ever to represent East Africa
Kabetu, Ted	14	Wing	Kenya	Mombasa Sports Club	Also played for Scorpions RFC, Kenya and East Africa. First black player to represent East Africa, touring Ireland with Fourth Tuskers.
Larsen, Lau	5	Lock	Kenya	Nondescripts RFC	Played for Dar es Salaam RFC, Scorpions RFC and Tanzania.
Leask, Roy	9	Scrum-half	Kenya	Impala RFC	Also played for Lusaka Sports Club and Scorpions RFC
Muhato, John	15	Fullback	Kenya	Impala RFC	Professional hunter, represented Kenya in the Munich Olympics (1972) at shooting. Played for Scorpions RFC, Kenya and East Africa
Omaido, Jackson	13	Outside centre	Kenya	Nondescripts RFC	First season in senior rugby, Played for Scorpions RFC and West Kenya.
Omaido, Walter	10	Fly-half/Inside centre	Kenya	Nondescripts RFC	First season in senior rugby, Walter is Jackson's younger brother.
Onsotti, Chris	3	Prop	Kenya	Impala RFC	Chris' second tusker tour; he also toured Ireland. He is the only black player yet to have played for East Africa in the pack.
Partington, Derek	6	Flanker	Kenya	Nondescripts RFC	Played for Liverpool RFC, playing his second season in Kenya.
Riley, John	8	Number eight	Kenya	Nondescripts RFC	First season in Kenya, played for Streatham-Croydon RFC and S.E. Police (U.K.)
Rune, Palle	5	Lock	Kenya	Thika Sports Club	Played for Scorpions RFC
Smith, Rod	2	Hooker	Kenya	Kenya Harlequins	Played for Scots Guards and Scorpions RFC. Toured Texas with Impala RFC (1973)
Walsh, Mike			Kenya	Nondescripts RFC	Tour Secretary Played for Nondescripts RFC, touring Malawi and Zambia. Secretary of Scorpions RFC.

==== Zambia v East Africa 1975 ====
Sunday 31 August 1975

Zambia	18–15	East Africa
		Try: Kabetu (1)

Diggers RFC, Kitwe, Zambia

Team Lists

ZAMBIA
		Player	Club	Home Union
FB	15	L. Roger	Ndola Wanderers RFC	(Zambia)
RW	14	D. Eastcroft	Lusaka RFC	(Zambia)
OC	13	D. Holt	Nchanga RFC	(Zambia)
IC	12	C. Plaisted	Mufulira RFC	(Zambia)
LW	11	G. Redlinghys	Nchanga RFC	(Zambia)
FH	10	B. Brindley	Ndola Wanderers RFC	(Zambia)
SH	9	P. Ellis	Lusaka RFC	(Zambia)
LP	1	P. Duffy	Roan Antelope RFC	(Zambia)
HK	2	G. Charalambides	Diggers RFC	(Zambia)
TP	3	M. Smith	Nchanga RFC	(Zambia)
LL	4	G. Wadey	Lusaka RFC	(Zambia)
RL	5	Peter Stagg	Ndola Wanderers RFC	(Scotland) and (Zambia)
OF	6	C. Raleigh	Diggers RFC	(Zambia)
BF	7	S. Clarke	Nchanga RFC	(Zambia)
N8	8	G. Patterson (c)	Lusaka RFC	(Zambia)
Substitutes:
	16	C.McVeigh	Lusaka RFC	(Zambia)
	17	J.Archer	Lusaka RFC	(Zambia)
	18	Stucki	Lusaka RFC	(Zambia)
	19	R.Taylor	Ndola Wanderers RFC	(Zambia)
	20	G.Murray	Ndola Wanderers RFC	(Zambia)
Manager:		J. Wesson		(Zambia)

EAST AFRICA
		Player	Club	Home Union
FB	15	J. Muhato	Impala RFC	(Kenya)
RW	14	T. Kabetu	Mombasa Sports Club	(Kenya)
OC	13	P. Evans (c)	Nondescripts RFC	(Kenya)
IC	12	D. Hughes	Thika Sports Club	(Kenya)
LW	11	K. Granger-Brown	Nondescripts RFC	(Kenya)
FH	10	R. Rowland	Impala RFC	(Kenya)
SH	9	R. Leask	Impala RFC	(Kenya)
LP	1	A. Cobb	Impala RFC	(Kenya)
HK	2	R. Smith	Kenya Harlequins	(Kenya)
TP	3	J. Allison	Kenya Harlequins	(Kenya)
LL	4	J. Cashin	Kenya Harlequins	(Kenya)
RL	5	L. Larsen	Nondescripts RFC	(Kenya)
BF	6	J. Riley	Nondescripts RFC	(Kenya)
OF	7	M. Evans	Nondescripts RFC	(Kenya)
N8	8	R. Evans	Nondescripts RFC	(Kenya)
Substitutes:
	16	D. Evans	Nondescripts RFC	(Kenya)
	17	J. Omaido	Nondescripts RFC	(Kenya)
	18	J. Tarbit	Dar es Salaam RFC	(Tanzania)
	19	G. Davies	Impala RFC	(Kenya)
	20	C. Onsotti	Impala RFC	(Kenya)
Manager:		Douglas "Dougie" Hamilton		(Kenya)

=== Sixth Tuskers Zambia Tour 1979 ===
At the culmination of the 1978 tour to Zambia by Kenya an invitation was issued to the Tuskers to tour Zambia in 1979 to celebrate the 25th anniversary of the First Tuskers Tour. The second ever match between East Africa and Zambia took place on this tour with East Africa winning 21–13, thus evening up the record. Jackson Omaido (Mean Machine) was tour Captain.

=== Seventh Tuskers Zambia and Zimbabwe Tour 1982 ===
The entire squad consisted of Kenyan players with the exception of David Nsubuga of Uganda. Rob Bertram, then chairman of Nondescripts RFC, was the tour manager and Jackson Omaido (Harlequins) was the Captain. Rodney Evans (Nondescripts) was player-coach and took over the captain's role with Omaido injured ahead of the test against Zimbabwe.

== List of Matches ==
All matches played at RFUEA Ground (Nairobi, Kenya) except for those on a Tuskers tour (indicated by a grey background).

Date	Opposition	Opposition players with, or subsequently awarded, caps	Score	Result	East Africa Captain
1950-01-07	University of Cape Town	South Africa (3), England (1), Scotland (1)	5–33	Lost	W.B. Young
1950-01-21	University of Cape Town	South Africa (3), England (1), Scotland (1)	0–16	Lost	W.B. Young
1950-01-28	University of Cape Town	South Africa (3), England (1), Scotland (1)	9–27	Lost	W.B. Young
1954	First Tuskers Copperbelt Tour				J. Todd
1954-08-21	Ndola Wanderers RFC at Ndola		5–13	Won	
1954-08-22	Combined Diggers/Pirates XV at Nkana		18–24	Won	
1954-08-25	Combined Nchanga/Mufulira XV at Mufulira		6–35	Won	
1954-08-28	Combined Mufulira/Nchanga XV at Chingola		3–11	Won	
1954-08-29	Copperbelt XV at Luanshya		29–11	Lost	
1954-09-1	Roan Antelope RFC at Luanshya		15–21	Won	
1954-09-4	Broken Hill RFC at Broken Hill		6–16	Won	
1954-09-5	Lusaka RFC at Lusaka		8–13	Won	
1955-09-28	British Lions	Wales (7), England (3), Scotland (3), Ireland (2)	12–39	Lost	P.J.F. Wheeler
1956-01-	Rhodes University Invitation XV		9–18	Lost	A.I. McLean
1956-01-	Rhodes University Invitation XV		0–41	Lost	R. Kavanagh
1956-01-	Rhodes University Invitation XV		8–16	Lost	A.M. Tippett
1956-02-	Rhodes University Invitation XV		6–25	Lost	
1957-07-20	Combined (Oxford and Cambridge) Universities	England (6), Scotland (2), Ireland (1), Wales (1); Including 2 British Lions	9–44	Lost	D.F. Rees
1957-08-17	Combined (Oxford and Cambridge) Universities	England (6), Scotland (2), Ireland (1), Wales (1); Including 2 British Lions	6–47	Lost	E.R. Evans
1957	Salisbury Sports Club (Rhodesia)	(Federation of Rhodesia and Nyasaland) Rhodesia (2)	9–22	Lost	
1958-05-28	Barbarian F.C.	Wales (5), Scotland (4), Ireland (2); Including 10 British Lions	12–52	Lost	A.I. McLean
1958–12	University of Cape Town	South Africa (1)	12–24	Lost	R.H. Chambers
1959–01	University of Cape Town	South Africa (1)	3–54	Lost	W.W. Law
1959–01	University of Cape Town	South Africa (1)	0–54	Lost	E.R. Evans
1961	South Africa	Full South African International Team	0–39	Lost	C.C. Young
1962-05-05	British Combined Services	Scotland (1), Wales (1) and one Barbarian	17–36	Lost	R.B. Laing
1962	Second Tuskers Copperbelt Tour				C.C. Young
1962	Ndola Wanderers RFC		–	Won	
1962	Mufulira		–	Won	
1962			–	Lost	
1962			–	Lost	
1962			–	Lost	
1962			–	Lost	
1962			–	Lost	
1962-08-28	British Lions	Wales (6), Ireland (4), England (3), Scotland (2)	0–55	Lost	C.C. Young
1963	Richmond F.C.		11–8	Won	C.C. Young
1963	Combined (Oxford and Cambridge) Universities		0–19	Lost	C.C. Young
1964	Wales	Full Welsh International Team	8–26	Lost	R.B. Laing
1965	Anti-Assassins		0–13	Lost	D.S. Reynolds
1966	Blackheath F.C.		5–44	Lost	P.J. Spark
1966	Third Tuskers England Tour				B.G. Granville-Ross
1966	Richmond F.C.		–	Lost	
1966	Anti-Assassins (at Bury)		–	Lost	
1966	Blackheath F.C.		–	Lost	
1966	Wilmslow		–	Lost	
1966	Vale of Lune		–	Lost	
1966	Harlequins		–	Lost	
1966	Fylde		–	Lost	
1967	British Middle East Command		5–15	Lost	
1968	Queen's University (Belfast) R.F.C.		5–29	Lost	D.S. Reynolds
1968-07-20	Middlesex County XV		0–28	Lost	D.S. Reynolds
1969	Anti-Assassins		8–40	Lost	A. Evans
1971	Cork Constitution RFC		6–9	Lost	G. Barbour
1971	Blackrock College RFC		24–8	Won	K. Lillis
1972-04-29	Rosslyn Park F.C.		9–26	Lost	D. Parker
1972	Richmond F.C.		9–19	Lost	G. Barbour
1972	Fourth Tuskers Ireland Tour				G. Barbour
1972			–	Won	
1972			–	Won	
1972			–	Won	
1972			–	Lost	
1972			–	Lost	
1972			–	Lost	
1972			–	Lost	
1972			–	Lost	
1973-08-04	Wasps RFC		13–31	Lost	K. Lillis
1973	Harlequin F.C.		15–20	Lost	K. Lillis
1975	Fifth Tuskers Zambia Tour				R. Dicky Evans^{[b]}
1975-08-23	Zambia club champions 1975 (Ndola Wanderers RFC) at Ndola	Peter Stagg Scotland and British Lions	–	Won	
1975-08-26	Combined (Roan/Ndola/Mufulira/Chibuluma) XV at Mufulira		–	Won	
1975-08-28	Combined (Chingola/Diggers/Kitwe) XV at Nchanga		–	Won	
1975-08-31	Zambia at Kitwe	Full Zambian International Team (including Peter Stagg Scotland and British Lions)	18–15	Lost	P.D. Evans
1975-09-02	Combined Zambian Clubs XV (Lechwe RFC) at Luanshya (under floodlights)		4–31	Won	
1975-09-06	Midlands at Lusaka		–	Won	
1976	Rugby Roma Olimpic		6–9	Lost	R.G.R. Evans
1976	Rugby Roma Olimpic		9–9	Drawn	R.G.R. Evans
1976	Combined Zambian Clubs XV (Lechwe RFC)		6–23	Lost	R.F. Rowland
1979-05-26	Blackheath F.C.		–		
1979	Sixth Tuskers Zambia Tour				
1979	Zambia	Full Zambian International Team	13–21	Won	
			–		
1982	Seventh Tuskers Zambia and Zimbabwe Tour				R.G.R. Evans
1982	Copperbelt XV at Roan Antelope RFC, Luanshya		6–25	Won	
1982	Ndola Wanderers RFC at Ndola		3–20	Won	
1982	Matabeleland XV at Hartsfield Ground, Bulawayo		40–19	Lost	
1982	Midlands XV at Que-Que		16–35	Won	
1982-03-20	Zimbabwe at Salisbury	Full Zimbabwean International Team	15–12	Lost	

== Notable personalities ==
The first black player to represent East Africa was J.K. "Ted" Kabetu (Mombasa Sports Club), who played on the wing against Richmond F.C. in 1972: he was also the first black rugby player at Mombasa Sports Club and, in 1974, the first black player to captain a rugby club in East Africa. Another Nairobi School former pupil, Chris Onsotti (then of Impala R.F.C., later of Mwamba R.F.C.) was the first black player to represent East Africa as a forward, playing prop on the Fourth Tuskers tour of Ireland 1972.

There is a frequently repeated urban myth that Idi Amin was selected as a replacement by the team for their 1955 match against the British Lions, while still a sergeant in the King's African Rifles. While Amin did play club rugby at the time, he does not appear in the team photograph or on the official team list.

== Playing record ==
=== Test Matches ===
Against	Played	Won	Lost	Drawn	% Won
British Lions	2	0	2	0	0%
South Africa	1	0	1	0	0%
Wales	1	0	1	0	0%
Zambia	3	2	1	0	67%
Zimbabwe	1	0	1	0	0%
Total	8	2	6	0	25%

=== Non-test Matches ===
Against	Played	Won	Lost	Drawn	% Won
University of Cape Town	7	0	7	0	0%
Copperbelt XV	2	1	1	0	50%
Rhodes University Invitation XV	4	0	4	0	0%
Combined (Oxford and Cambridge) Universities	3	0	3	0	0%
Salisbury Sports Club	1	0	1	0	0%
Barbarian F.C.	1	0	1	0	0%
British Combined Services	1	0	1	0	0%
Richmond F.C.	2	1	1	0	50%
Anti-Assassins	2	0	2	0	0%
Blackheath F.C.	1	0	1	0	0%
British Middle East Command	1	0	1	0	0%
Queen's University (Belfast) R.F.C.	1	0	1	0	0%
Middlesex County XV	1	0	1	0	0%
Cork Constitution RFC	1	0	1	0	0%
Blackrock College RFC	1	0	1	0	0%
Rosslyn Park F.C.	1	0	1	0	0%
Wasps RFC	1	0	1	0	0%
Harlequin F.C.	1	0	1	0	0%
Total	32	2	30	0	6.4%

== Participating unions ==
The members of this team are drawn from players who qualify to be selected for:

- Kenya national rugby union team
- Tanzania national rugby union team
- Uganda national rugby union team

== See also ==
- East Africa cricket team

== Notes ==
a. In the 1960s, rugby teams started separating backs and forwards in practice as the game had evolved such that their functions and tactics became increasingly disconnected. The Sherborne School team (under their coaches M.M. Walford and H.F.W. Holmes) began to use the hooker to throw the ball in to line-outs at practice rather than disrupt the rehearsal of moves by the backs. It followed logically that having practiced the technique the hooker should throw in the ball during matches, particularly as the opposition would be required to reduce their line-out to seven players in order to match the throwing teams numbers. This tactic was taken to Oxford University by the Sherborne hooker, D.M. Barry, from where it has spread to become accepted practise throughout the world.

b. The Evans family has had a great influence on the development of rugby in East Africa, but Dicky Evans, though he shares the same surname and was, like them, a member of Nondescripts RFC, is not part of this family. Dicky was later to become owner and then president of the Cornish Pirates rugby team in the United Kingdom.

c. East Africa's original jerseys from the 1950s and early 1960s were numbered from fullback (1) to scrum-half (7) followed by looshead prop (8) to Number-8 (15).

== Sources ==
- East Africa vs Combined Services 5 May 1962
