= 1964 Wales rugby union tour of Africa =

Summary
P	W	D	L
Total
5	3	0	2
Test match
1	0	0	1
Opponent
P	W	D	L
South Africa
1	0	0	1

Tour chronology
- 1968 Argentina →

The 1964 Wales rugby union tour of Africa was a collection of friendly rugby union games undertaken by the Wales national rugby union team to Africa. The tour took in five matches against African regional and invitational teams with one test against South Africa. This was the first official Wales tour to the southern hemisphere; Wales' first match outside Europe (and thus their first match in the Southern Hemisphere) was played against East Africa on Tuesday May 12, 1964.

The tour was not a success for Wales. Under the leadership of Clive Rowlands, Wales won the opening two games, but were unconvincing in the second match against Boland. The South African test at Durban saw Wales lose by the largest margin in forty years.

== Results ==
Scores and results list Wales' points tally first.

Opponent	For	Against	Date	Venue	Status
East Africa	26	8	12 May 1964	RFUEA Ground, Nairobi	Tour match
Boland	17	6	19 May 1964	Wellington	Tour match
South Africa	3	24	23 May 1964	Kings Park, Durban	Test Match
Northern Transvaal	9	22	27 May 1964	Pretoria	Tour match
Orange Free State	14	6	30 May 1964	Bloemfontein	Tour match

== Touring party ==
- Manager: David J. Phillips

=== Full backs ===
- Grahame Hodgson (Neath)
- Haydn Davies (London Welsh)

=== Three-quarters ===
- Dewi Bebb (Swansea)
- Keith Bradshaw (Bridgend)
- John Dawes (London Welsh)
- Ken Jones (Llanelli)
- Stuart Watkins (Newport)

=== Half backs ===
- Clive Rowlands (Pontypool) (captain)
- Allan Lewis (Abertillery)
- David Watkins (Newport)
- M. Young (Bridgend RFC)

=== Forwards ===
- Len Cunningham (Aberavon)
- Norman Gale (Llanelli)
- David Hayward (Cardiff)
- J. Isaacs (Swansea)
- John Mantle (Newport)
- Haydn Morgan (Abertillery)
- Alun Pask (Abertillery)
- Brian Price (Newport)
- Gareth Prothero (Bridgend)
- Brian Thomas (Neath)
- Ron Waldron (Neath)
- Denzil Williams (Ebbw Vale)

== Matches ==
=== East Africa ===
12 May 1964
17:00 EAT (UTC+3)

East Africa	8–26	Wales
Try: Andrews; Con: Young; Pen: Young		Try: Bebb; Dawes; Jones (2); Gale; Con: Bradshaw (4); Pen: Bradshaw

Ngong Road Ground, Nairobi, Kenya
Attendance: 6,000
Referee: G. E. Neville (Kenya R.R.S)

FB	1	(Kenya) W. Kennedy
RW	2	(Kenya) T. Tory
OC	3	(Kenya) C. J. C. Irvine
IC	4	(Kenya) C. C. Young
LW	5	(Kenya) E. Weaver
FH	6	(Kenya) B. K. McGuinness
SH	7	(Kenya) K. F. O'Byrne
LP	8	(Kenya) K. I. Duncan
HK	9	(Kenya) F. A. R. Bwye
TP	10	(Kenya) B. Shorter
LL	11	(Kenya) D. S. Reynolds
RL	12	(Tanzania) A. Russell
OF	13	(Kenya) G. Barbour
BF	14	(Kenya) R. B. Laing (c)
N8	15	(Kenya) Mike Andrews

FB	8	Grahame Hodgson
RW	1	Dewi Bebb
OC	2	Keith Bradshaw
IC	5	John Dawes
LW	10	Ken Jones
FH	24	J. M. Young
SH	18	Clive Rowlands (c)
LP	23	Denzil Williams
HK	6	Norman Gale
TP	3	Len Cunningham
LL	15	Brian Price
RL	19	Brian Thomas
BF	16	Gareth Prothero
OF	12	John Mantle
N8	7	David John Hayward

=== South Africa ===
23 May 1964

South Africa	24–3	Wales
Try: Hopwood; Marais; Smith; Con: Oxlee (3); Pen: Oxlee (2); Drop: Wilson		Pen: Bradshaw

Kings Park Stadium, Durban, South Africa
Attendance: 35,000
Referee: G. K. Engelbrecht (South Africa)

FB	15	Lionel Wilson
RW	14	Jannie Engelbrecht
OC	13	John Gainsford
IC	12	Dave Stewart
LW	11	Corra Dirksen
FH	10	Keith Oxlee
SH	9	Nelie Smith
N8	8	Doug Hopwood
OF	7	Tommy Bedford
BF	6	Frik du Preez
RL	5	Avril Malan
LL	4	Gawie Carelse
TP	3	Hannes Marais
HK	2	Abie Malan (c)
LP	1	Mof Myburgh

FB	15	Grahame Hodgson
RW	11	Dewi Bebb
OC	13	John Dawes
IC	12	Keith Bradshaw
LW	14	Ken Jones
FH	10	David Watkins
SH	9	Clive Rowlands (c)
N8	8	John Mantle
FL	7	David John Hayward
FL	6	Alun Pask
LK	5	Brian Thomas
LK	4	Brian Price
PR	3	Denzil Williams
HK	2	Norman Gale
PR	1	Len Cunningham

== Bibliography ==
- Billot, John (1974). Springboks in Wales. Ferndale: Ron Jones Publications.
- Smith, David; Williams, Gareth (1980). Fields of Praise: The Official History of The Welsh Rugby Union. Cardiff: University of Wales Press. ISBN 0-7083-0766-3.
