= Scorpions RFC =

East African invitational rugby union team

Scorpions
- Unions: Rugby Football Union of East Africa; Kenya Rugby Football Union; Tanzania Rugby Football Union; Uganda Rugby Football Union
- Founded: 1959
Team kit

First match
- Nondescripts RFC - Scorpions (1959)

The Scorpions RFC is an invitation rugby team in East Africa that was established upon principles that have many parallels with the Barbarian F.C. in terms of values, playing style, selection policy and the lack of a home ground. The team wears black shirts and white shorts and, like the original Barbarians and the French Barbarians, players wear socks of their choice provided that they have played for the team that the socks represent (the socks shown to the right are the original Harlequins socks which were also worn by Kenya Harlequins in the 1950s and 1960s).

== Foundation ==
The club was founded in 1959 in Dodoma, central Tanganyika (now Tanzania) to function as an invitation touring side. The idea was first put forward by W.K.L. Ken Thomas who also became the club's first captain and chairman. With marginal rainfall, rocky outcrops, thorny scrub and dry sandy soil, Dodoma is an ideal habitat for the scorpions after which the club is named, but a less suitable place to play rugby is hard to imagine. The touring element drifted almost immediately into obscurity and the club eventually became based in Kenya as rugby in Tanzania dwindled during the 1970s.

== Aims and Principles ==
The over-riding principle behind the team is to play and foster the playing of rugby football of the best possible type and to insist upon the highest standards of discipline and behaviour, both on and off the field.

to play and foster the playing of rugby football of the best possible type and to insist upon the highest standards of discipline and behaviour, both on and off the field.

'Scorpions Constitution (1959)'

The vast distances and primitive transport networks of Colonial East Africa made the playing of rugby difficult, particularly so in Tanganyika. The intention behind the founding of the Scorpions was to allow players in Tanganyika to play high quality rugby that would otherwise be unavailable to them, thus membership (which is by invitation only), would be available to any player in Tanganyika. With time the net was thrown wider to include any player in East Africa (Kenya, Uganda and Tanzania). The Scorpions are able to introduce younger players to a higher level of rugby and to experiment by trying players in unusual positions, something that representative selectors are unable to attempt for fear of criticism.

The club has no club-house, they usually play their matches at the RFUEA Ground and, in order to stimulate interest in rugby to as wide an audience as possible, they never take a gate allowing spectators from all financial backgrounds to watch them play.

== Match List ==
The Scorpions have built up a sporting tradition of encounters with famous clubs on tour. The majority of these games have been lost but the Scorpions have endeavoured to live up to their principles and have scored notable victories over Anti-Assassins (1964) and London Wasps (1973) and also earned a draw with Blackheath F.C. in 1979.

Blackrock College RFC is a club originally formed by old-boys of Blackrock College, an institution founded by the Congregation of the Holy Ghost in 1860. In 1939, the same order set up St. Mary's School, Nairobi to be run under the same Spiritian ethos, an ethos that embraces the benefits of sport in general and rugby union in particular. This has begun a long connection between the order and the East African rugby community; St. Mary's School hosts an annual schools rugby festival and (along with Lenana School, Rift Valley Academy and Strathmore School) it is one of the major producers of rugby players in Kenya. In addition, Blackrock College RFC toured East Africa in 1971 and the Fourth Tuskers played a return fixture during their tour of Ireland the next year.

When, in 1973, the Scorpions played the Old Georgian Club from Argentina, the former England captain Dick Greenwood was in Kenya on a coaching assignment for the RFU. He was selected to play in the second row by Scorpions who lost by one point after a non-stop display of running attacking rugby that ranks among the most thrilling matches ever played on the RFUEA Ground. Dick then travelled to Italy to become the Coach of Rugby Roma Olimpic (1973–1976) and, using the contacts that he had made in Kenya, an East African tour was arranged for the Italian club in 1976 during which they too played against the Scorpions.

Date	Opponent	From	Location	Result	Score
1959-08-04	Nondescripts RFC	Kenya	Parklands Sports Club, Nairobi	Won	25-9
1959-08-06	Kitale Rugby Club	Kenya	Kitale Sports Club, Kitale	Lost	8-26
1959-08-08	Nakuru RFC	Kenya	Nakuru Athletic Club, Nakuru	Lost	3-9
1959-08-10	Kenya Harlequins	Kenya	RFUEA Ground, Nairobi	Lost	11-15
1960-10-08	Kampala RFC	Uganda	Nakivubo Stadium, Kampala		
1961-05-	Pretoria Harlequins	South Africa	Nakuru	Lost	0 - 14
1964-	Anti-Assassins	England	RFUEA Ground, Nairobi	Won	-
1966-04-24	Blackheath F.C.	England	RFUEA Ground, Nairobi		
1968-03-23	Queens University RFC	Ireland	RFUEA Ground, Nairobi		
1968-07-14	Middlesex	England	RFUEA Ground, Nairobi	Lost	0 - 47
1969-	Anti-Assassins	England	RFUEA Ground, Nairobi	Lost	14 - 48
1971-03-28	9 Parachute Squadron RE, British Army	United Kingdom	RFUEA Ground, Nairobi		-
1971-07-04	Blackrock College RFC	Ireland	RFUEA Ground, Nairobi	Lost	13 - 16
1972-04-	Rosslyn Park F.C.	England	RFUEA Ground, Nairobi		-
1972-07-30	Richmond F.C.	England	RFUEA Ground, Nairobi	Lost	12 - 18
1973-05-05	London Harlequins FC	England	RFUEA Ground, Nairobi	Lost	6 - 41
1973-07-29	Wasps FC	England	RFUEA Ground, Nairobi	Won	-
1973-	Old Georgians	Argentina	RFUEA Ground, Nairobi	Lost	21 - 22
1976-06-05	Rugby Roma Olimpic	Italy	RFUEA Ground, Nairobi	Lost	13 - 16
1979-05-12	Blackheath F.C.	England	RFUEA Ground, Nairobi	Drawn	17 - 17
1982-05-22	Anti-Assassins	England	RFUEA Ground, Nairobi		-
1984-05-16	Suttonians RFC	Ireland	Impala Ground, Nairobi	Lost	10 - 19
1988-08	Sherborne RFC / RC Granvillais	England / France	RFUEA Ground, Nairobi	Won	-
01-06-2023	Bryncethin RFC	Wales	Mae Zedong Stadium, Zanzibar	Won	38 - 5

== Match details ==
=== Blackheath 1979 ===
Saturday 12 May 1979
1630 EAT (UTC+3)

Scorpions RFC	17 – 17	Blackheath F.C.
Try: Hadman (1); Omaido (1); Evans, M. (1); Con: Roy (1); Pen: None; Drop: Roy (1)		Try: FORWARDS (1); Purchase (1); Con: None; Pen: Kelsey-Fry (3); Drop: None

Ngong Road Ground, Nairobi, Kenya
Referee: G. Fenn (London R.R.S.)

Touch-judge: R.G.R. Evans (Kenya R.R.S.)

Touch-judge: P. Piper

Team Lists

SCORPIONS
		Player	Club	Honours
FB	15	P.D. Evans	Nondescripts RFC	Kenya and East Africa
RW	14	B. Omolo	Blak Blad RFC
OC	13	J. Omaido	Mean Machine RFC	Kenya and East Africa
IC	12	A. Scutt	West Kenya RFC
LW	11	S.L. Rigby	Nondescripts RFC	Kenya
FH	10	G. Roy	Impala RFC
SH	9	R.G Leask (c)	Impala RFC	Kenya and East Africa
LP	1	D. Wallace	Nondescripts RFC
HK	2	J. Ellis	Kenya Harlequins	Kenya and East Africa
TP	3	C.J. Onsotti	Kenya Harlequins	Kenya and East Africa
LL	4	M.A. Riley	Nondescripts RFC
RL	5	W.J. Okwirry	Impala RFC
OF	6	M. Evans	Nondescripts RFC	Kenya and East Africa
BF	7	G. Chief Edebe	Mean Machine RFC	Kenya and East Africa
N8	8	W.G. Hadman	Nondescripts RFC
Substitutes:
	16	E. Kabetu	Mombasa Sports Club	Kenya and East Africa
	17	C.J.S Taylor	Nondescripts RFC
	18	E. Ayodo	Impala RFC
	19	D. Awimbo	Mwamba RFC
	20	T. Ollerhead	Nondescripts RFC
	21	J. Omany	Impala RFC
Coach:		None

BLACKHEATH F.C.
		Player	Club	Honours
FB	15	B. Kelsey-Fry	Blackheath F.C.	Kent County
RW	14	K. Purchase	Blackheath F.C.	Kent and England U19
OC	13	J. Kelly	Ebbw Vale RFC and Cross Keys RFC
IC	12	N Walker	Sevenoaks RFC	Kent U21
LW	11	J Percival	Blackheath F.C.	Hampshire County
FH	10	R. Whiteman	Blackheath F.C.	Oxford University RFC
SH	9	P. McFarland	King's College Hospital RFC	Staffordshire U19
LP	1	C. Bailward	Blackheath F.C.	England Trialist and Eastern Counties
HK	2	J. Murphy	Blackheath F.C.	Kent County
TP	3	K. Cairns	Saracens RFC	England Trialist
LL	4	R. Hill (c)	Blackheath F.C.	England Trialist and Kent
RL	5	N. Joyce	Leicester F.C.	England Trialist
BF	6	C. Hooker	Blackheath F.C.	South v Australia
OF	7	R. Naish	Blackheath F.C.	Surrey and London Counties
N8	8	G.J Adey	Leicester F.C.	Barbarians and England
Substitutes:
SH	16	I. Tharby	Blackheath F.C.	Kent Schoolboys
H	17	A. Johns	Blackheath F.C.
L	18	P Lovett	Blackheath F.C.	Notts/Lincs/Derby U23
P	19	J. Montgomery	Blackheath F.C.	Kent County and Ulster U21
	20	D. Blacklocks	Blackheath F.C.
	21
Manager:		John Legge		Kent County Coach

== Members ==
=== Past Administrators ===
- W.K.L. Ken Thomas (Founder member, Chairman and Captain)
- Dennie O'Loghlen (Founder member and Chairman)
- Charles Hodgson (Chairman)
- Rex Chamberlain (Secretary / Treasurer)
- Alex M Christie (Vice president of Wasps FC in London and President of the RFUEA)
- Edwin Eddie Bristow
- Brian Granville-Ross
- Peter Williams
- Frank Lawson
- Bob Shephard
- Tony Parfitt
- D.P. Dougie Hamilton
- M.J.A. Mike Walsh
- David Round-Turner
- Mark Riley
- Chris Everard

=== Past Captains ===
- Rob Rowland
- D.P. Dougie Hamilton
- Mike Andrews
- Peter D. Evans
- Roy Leask
- Kevin Lillis

=== Notable players ===
- Dick Greenwood (former England captain)
- E. Ted Kabetu (first black player to be selected by Scorpions and to represent East Africa)

=== Other Players ===
- A. Cobb
- R.T. Harris
- M.C. Barnes
- R. Gillett
- J. McFie
- C.J. Maile
- M.G. Lumsdaine
- J. Maynard
- R.N. Shephard
- Oluf Jorgensen
- J.W. Eaton
- J. Setchell
- R. Benyon
- Hugh McGarry
- A. Glover
- G.T. Tom Thorpe
- G. Clode
- R.M. Watson
- R. Richards
- B.Patrick N. Plumbe
- K.A.G. Parfitt
- P. Ilsley
- A.M. Dale
- A.L. Mitchell
- R.T. Hughes
- George Barbour
- Lau Larsen
- R. Jones
- Ronnie Andrews
- Mike Evans
- J.C.D. Parsons
- A. Rees
- A. Cure
- Richard Mercer
- George McKnight
- M.J.Hebert
- Dicky Evans
- R. Smith
- J.A. Allison
- B. Omolo
- Jackson Omaido
- A. Scutt
- S.L. Rigby
- George Roy
- Dave Wallace
- J. Ellis
- Chris J. Onsotti
- Mark A. Riley
- W.J. Okwirry
- Mike Evans
- C.G. Sullivan
- G. Chief Edebe
- W.G. Hadman
- C.J.S Taylor
- E. Ayodo
- D. Awimbo
- C. Fraser
- Tom Ollerhead
- J. Omany
- P. Coventry
- R.S. Sembi
- J.P. Scott

P.E L'Estrange
