= Maurice Daly (rugby union) =

English rugby union footballer

Maurice John P. Daly (born August 1914, died 3 November 1994, Mount Eliza, Victoria, Australia) was an English player of rugby union football, who played internationally for both Ireland and East Africa. Along with W.B. Young of Scotland he is one of only two people to have been capped by a major rugby playing nation and by East Africa.

== Prior to World War II ==
At his senior school, Maurice was a keen rugby player, cricketer, track athlete and Rugby fives player. After leaving school he played for Old Haberdashers RFC (1932–37) and the Harlequin F.C. (1938–39), scoring tries prolifically in both the 15-a-side and 7-a-side versions of the game. He was capped once for Ireland on 12 February 1938 playing on the right-wing against England at Lansdowne Road. England led 23–0 at half-time but Ireland improved during the second half managing to score four tries (the last of which was scored by Daly), though Ireland were unable to completely overcome the opposition, eventually losing 36–14.

== During the war ==
He was commissioned in the 35th (First Surrey Rifles) Anti-Aircraft Battalion, T.A. in January 1939 and was called up in September of that year. It is believed that Maurice played for Clifton RFC during the 1939–40 season; an Army posting may explain his presence in Bristol at this time. He saw action in Italy, France, Belgium and Germany. The war caused much disruption to regular rugby in the United Kingdom though he continued to play some rugby during this time, turning out for various military units and also for several invitation sides for various charitable causes.

Date	Year	Played for	Played against	Venue	Notes
16 December	1939	combined Scotland and Ireland	combined England and Wales	Richmond	In aid of The Red Cross
21 September	1940	Rev. P. W. P. Brook's West of England XV	a British Empire XV	Clifton College	In aid of The Red Cross. The Empire XV won 23–21. The attendance was 4,000.
19 October	1940	a British Empire XV	L.J. Corbett's West of England XV	Bath	
2 November	1940	Rev. P. W. P. Brook's West of England XV	a Welsh Army XV	Clifton College	
23 November	1940	Voyce's XV	Wakefield's XV	Gloucester	
14 December	1940	L.J. Corbett's West of England XV	Police of South Wales XV	Taunton	
1 March	1941	Anti-Aircraft Command XV	Aldershot Services XV	Aldershot	
22 March	1941	L.J. Corbett's XV	a Police XV	Taunton	
22 January	1944	Anti-Aircraft Command XV	Scottish Services XV	Inverleith, Edinburgh	

After being wounded he became Air Liaison Officer, North West Europe in December 1944 with the rank of major and was awarded the M.B.E.

== After the war ==
After the war he returned to play with Harlequins (1945–48); he captained the Harlequins VII that lost the final of the 1947–48 Middlesex 7's to Wasps 14–5. He was also selected to represent Middlesex County consistently between 1946 and 1949, captaining the side that lost the 1946/47 semi-final with Gloucestershire.

Sometime in 1949–50, he moved to Kenya where he continued to play rugby for the Ruiru R.F.C. and was awarded a cap by East Africa for a match that he played in 1951. Though the Rugby Football Union of East Africa (RFUEA) did not exist until 1953, Maurice played for Kenya Colony (the precursor of the Kenya national rugby union team) against the "Oxford and Cambridge Universities" touring team in September 1951 at Mitchell Park (now Jamhuri Park), Nairobi. All players on the Kenyan team in that match were awarded backdated East Africa caps after the formation of the RFUEA. Oxford and Cambridge were returning by air from a successful tour of South Africa and they stopped off to play one final match on the continent. The visitors fielded six international players (Ian J. Botting (England), John V. Smith(England), Laurie G. Gloag (Scotland), Lewis B. Cannell(England), John MacG. Kendall-Carpenter (England) and George C. Rittson-Thomas (England)) and three players who were to achieve international status on their return (Chris E. Winn (England), Ricky M. Bartlett (England) and Mike Walker (Scotland)) and proved too strong for their hosts, winning 44–5.

He met his wife in Kenya and they were married in 1952. They left Kenya during the Mau Mau Uprising moving to Sussex, where they lived for 15 years until they finally emigrated to Australia.
