= Anti-Assassins =

English invitational rugby union team

(England) Anti-Assassins
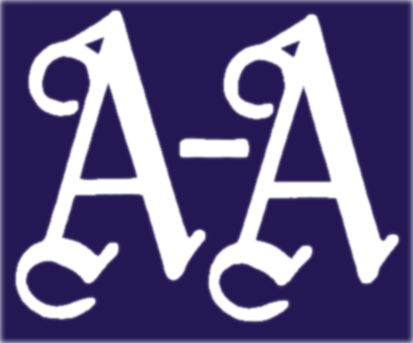
- Unions: Lancashire RFU
- Founded: 1950; 76 years ago
Team kit

The Anti-Assassins Rugby Union Football team (A-As) was an invitation team that selected players from the northern counties of England to play friendly charitable matches locally and to go on tour. The team was remodelled in 2004, teaming up with the Wooden Spoon Society (another charitable rugby organisation) to become the Spoon AAs.

The Spoon AAs rugby team continues to play a mixture of traditional fixtures with matches against the Old Boys teams from Sedbergh, Kirkham, Giggleswick and Stonyhurst. Special matches against clubs in the North and other parts of the country are arranged to celebrate Anniversaries and openings etc. The team has recently travelled to Cambridge University, Richmond and Taunton, they have played against the Royal Navy and a British Army team based in Germany, as well as a variety of Sevens tournaments.

Semper Mores Boni, Latin for "good behaviour always", is the motto of the club.

== History ==
The Anti-Assassins was founded in 1950 when three Old Sedberghians, Stewart Faulds, Geoff and Arthur Kenyon, were invited to pick a Northern team to play against the masters and Old Boys (The Assassins) of Sedbergh School, Cumbria. This invitation team carried on playing a variety of fixtures, mainly in the North, raising money for established charities, celebrating special club occasions and helping to develop rugby football at leading schools.

== Opponents ==
The A-As have played many clubs locally in the north of England, they have conducted tours within Europe (to Galway, Isle of Man, Jersey, Ulster, France, the Netherlands, Italy and Spain) and have been further afield to play matches and 7's tournaments in Australia, Canada, Dubai, East Africa, South Africa, USA and the Caribbean. The A-As were a regular fixture at the Glengarth Sevens at Davenport Rugby Club (now Stockport R.U.F.C) and won the Davenport plate in 1978.

=== East Africa tours ===
==== 1964 ====
The first tour to East Africa by the Anti-Assassins took place in 1964 (one source states 1965^{[a]}).

1964 Tour Matches and Results
Date	Opposition	Location	Result	Score
1964- -	Scorpions RFC	RFUEA ground, Nairobi	lost	-
1964- - ^{[a]}	East Africa	RFUEA ground, Nairobi	won	0 - 13

==== 1969 ====
The second Anti-Assassins tour to East Africa occurred five years later. (In the intervening years East Africa had played against the Anti-Assassins on their "Third Tuskers Tour" to England in 1966; on this tour East Africa had also played against Richmond F.C., Blackheath F.C., Wilmslow RUFC, Vale of Lune RUFC, Harlequin F.C. and Fylde, losing all their matches).

Stewart Faulds, the founder of the Anti-Assassins, was the 1969 tour manager and in an interview for Rugby World magazine he stated that despite the scorelines, the matches were not as one sided as they may appear on paper; it was not until the end of the second half in many of the matches that the visitors took control. He also stated that the RFUEA's administration and organisation could not be bettered anywhere and suggested that any club that could undertake a similar tour would be ensured a trip of a lifetime.

The matches were very popular attracting crowds never fewer than 1,500 spectators and the last match of the tour against East Africa was watched by nearly 4,000 people.

The player of the tour was the Rugby School former pupil Bill Hartley (Headingley and Yorkshire) who scored 22 tries in seven matches playing on the wing. Another standout player was the flanker Stan Purdy (Warwickshire and England). The team was captained by WM (Bill) Patterson (Sale FC, Cheshire, England and Lions) who suffered a concussion in the last game and was replaced by Malcolm Philips (Oxford University and England).

1969 Tour Matches and Results
Date	Opposition	Location	Result	Score
1969- -	Uganda	Kampala	won	14 - 37
1969- -	West Kenya Province	Kitale	won	18 - 60
1969- -	Kenya Clubs	Nakuru	won	3 - 28
1969- -	Central Province (Kenya)	Nairobi	won	15 - 25
1969- -	Scorpions RFC	RFUEA ground, Nairobi	won	14 - 48
1969- -	Tanzania	Dar es Salaam	won	8 - 30
1969- -	Coast Province	Mombasa	won	6 - 50
1969- -	East Africa	RFUEA ground, Nairobi	won	8 - 40

==== 1982 ====
The third East Africa tour was conducted in 1982, though strictly it was a tour of Kenya rather than the whole of East Africa. By playing Kenya on this tour they achieved feat perhaps unrivalled by any club, that of having played all three East African nations (Kenya, Tanzania and Uganda) and the East African multinational side.

1982 Tour Matches and Results
Date	Opposition	Location	Result	Score
1982-05-22	Scorpions RFC	RFUEA ground, Nairobi		-
1982-05-25	West Kenya Province	Nakuru		-
1982-05-27	Nondescripts RFC	Parklands Sports Club, Nairobi	won	22 - 6
1982-05-29	Chairman's XV	RFUEA ground, Nairobi		-
1982-06-02	Mombasa RFC	Mombasa Sports Club, Mombasa		-
1982-06-05	Kenya	RFUEA ground, Nairobi		-

1982 Tour party

- J Fisher - Tour manager (Fylde and Cambridge University)
- B Fryer - Baggage master (Belfast RFC, Bury RFC and Lancashire)
- J Gardiner - Captain (Wilmslow RUFC, Sale FC and Cheshire)
- F MacLoughlin (Northern RFC, Connacht, Northumberland, Ireland and Lions)
- R Birtwistle (Fylde and Yorkshire)
- M Featherstone (Waterloo R.F.C.)
- J Webster (Wilmslow RUFC and Cheshire)
- L Aspden (Orrell R.U.F.C.)
- J Heaton (Orrell R.U.F.C., Wigan RUFC and Chester RUFC)
- P Philpot (Headingley FC and Yorkshire 'B')
- K Garnett (Fylde and Cumbria)
- R Samuels (Waterloo R.F.C. and Surrey)
- M Weir (Fylde and Lancashire)
- G Smith (Headingley FC and Yorkshire)
- D Fisher (Fylde and Scottish Universities)
- N Leeming (Fylde)
- P Southern (Wasps FC)
- A Machell (Headingley FC and Yorkshire)
- S Hartley (Broughton Park RUFC and Staffordshire)
- D Cleary (Orrell R.U.F.C.)
- S Christopherson (Waterloo R.F.C. and Lancashire)
- M Wright (Otley R.U.F.C. and Yorkshire)
- M Leach (Waterloo R.F.C. and Wales 'B'
- D Williams (Orrell R.U.F.C.)
- P Simpson (Gosforth RFC, Northumberland and Barbarian FC)
- G Stewart (Manchester RFC)
- N Spaven (Sale FC and Lancashire)
- S Bernard
- A Laycock (Cambridge University and Headingley FC)
- A Moran
- S Burgess

== Notable players ==
An invitation to represent the A-As has been extended to many players, be they just club level players or international players, over the last six decades. Amongst the players to wear the jersey are:

- Stuart Lancaster
- Bill Calcraft Australia
- Mark Ella Australia
- Ian McGeechan Scotland
- John O'Driscoll Ireland
- John Spencer England
- Peter Stagg Scotland
- David Strettle England
- Peter Winterbottom England
- Feidlim MacLoughlin Ireland and British Lions
- Paul Simpson Barbarian FC
- Martin Whitcombe
- Paul Turner

== Members ==
The Wooden Spoon Anti-Assassins’ membership includes over 100 internationals and four Past Presidents of the RFU. Bill Beaumont, the Lions Manager in New Zealand in 2005 and recently appointed Vice Chairman of the iRB was one of its members. Malcolm Phillips, President of the RFU in 2005-2006 is the new Wooden Spoon A-As’ President.

== Notes ==
a. One source claims that Anti-Assassins beat East Africa 13 -0 in 1965 whilst another claims that Anti-Assassins toured East Africa in 1964. It is assumed that the 1964 date is correct and that the 13- 0 defeat of East Africa took place on that tour.
