= Haydn Davies =

Haydn Davies may refer to:

- Haydn Davies (politician) (1905–1976), British MP for St Pancras South West
- Haydn Davies (cricketer) (1912–1993), Welsh cricketer
- Haydn Davies (rugby union) (1935–2017), Welsh rugby player
- Haydn Llewellyn Davies (1921–2008), Canadian sculptor
