= 2016–17 Kenya Cup =

- Countries: Kenya
- Date: 5 November 2016 – 22 April 2017

The 2016–17 Kenya Cup is the 47th edition of the top flight of Kenyan domestic rugby union competition.

Reduced in size from fourteen teams in the previous season to twelve, the league consists of each team playing sixteen matches followed by the top six clubs qualifying for the playoffs.

The reigning champions entering the tournament are Kabras Sugar RFC who defeated Impala Saracens 22–5 in the final the previous year.

Thika RFC and Kenya Sharks were relegated following the 2015–16 season. No teams were promoted.

== Pools ==
The twelve teams of the Kenya Cup are divided into two pools of six. Each team plays each team in the same pool twice, then plays each team in the opposite pool once.

Pool A
Kabras Sugar RFC
Kenya Commercial Bank RFC
Nakuru RFC
Mwamba RFC
Western Bulls RFC
Mean Machine RFC

Pool B
Impala Saracens
Kenya Harlequin F.C.
Homeboyz RFC
Strathmore University RFC
Blak Blad RFC
Nondescripts RFC

== Standings ==
Qualified for the Semi-Finals
Qualified for the Top Six Playoffs
Relegated

Place	Club	Games				Points			Bonus points	Table points
Place	Club	played	won	drawn	lost	for	against	diff	Bonus points	Table points
1	Homeboyz RFC	16	12	1	3	532	312	+220	17	67
2	KCB RFC	16	13	1	2	514	209	+305	12	66
3	Harlequins	16	13	0	3	485	245	+240	13	65
4	Impala Saracens	16	11	0	5	476	363	+113	14	58
5	Kabras Sugar RFC	16	11	1	4	396	262	+134	11	56
6	Mwamba RFC	16	8	1	7	400	285	+115	13	47
7	Nakuru RFC	16	10	1	5	326	263	+63	11	47
8	Nondescripts RFC	16	4	1	11	300	384	-84	5	27
9	Strathmore Leos	16	3	0	13	265	504	-239	5	17
10	Blak Blad RFC	16	3	0	13	255	485	-240	4	16
11	Western Bulls RFC	16	2	0	14	259	461	-202	6	14
12	Mean Machine RFC	16	2	0	14	157	530	-373	3	11

Table updated through 25 March 2017

== Regular season ==
=== Week 1 ===
5 November 2016	Homeboyz	48–17	Strathmore

5 November 2016	Kabras	14–13	Machine

5 November 2016	Bulls	0–31	KCB

5 November 2016	Nakuru	26–11	Mwamba

5 November 2016	Harlequins	47–8	Blak Blad

5 November 2016	Impala	37–22	Nondescripts

=== Week 2 ===
12 November 2016	Blak Blad	18–33	Impala

12 November 2016	Machine	7–41	Nakuru

12 November 2016	Mwamba	24–27	KCB

12 November 2016	Nondescripts	5–17	Homeboyz

12 November 2016	Bulls	8–17	Kabras

12 November 2016	Strathmore	22–39	Harlequins

=== Week 3 ===
19 November 2016	Bulls	23–5	Machine

19 November 2016	KCB	33–3	Nakuru

19 November 2016	Harlequins	31–24	Homeboyz

19 November 2016	Blak Blad	11–29	Nondescripts

19 November 2016	Impala	24–12	Strathmore

19 November 2016	Kabras	20–11	Mwamba

=== Week 4 ===
26 November 2016	Homeboyz	39–42	Impala

26 November 2016	Nakuru	15–19	Kabras

26 November 2016	Machine	8–49	KCB

26 November 2016	Mwamba	55–10	Bulls

26 November 2016	Nondescripts	10–24	Harlequins

26 November 2016	Strathmore 22	22–27	Blak Blad

=== Week 5 ===
3 December 2016	Bulls	10–41	Nakuru

3 December 2016	Mwamba	51–8	Machine

3 December 2016	Impala	10–28	Harlequins

3 December 2016	Blak Blad	11–43	Homeboyz

3 December 2016	Strathmore	43–10	Nondescripts

3 December 2016	Kabras	15–15	KCB

=== Week 6 ===
10 December 2016	Strathmore	33–32	Homeboyz

10 December 2016	Blak Blad	20–37	Harlequins

25 February 2017 (rescheduled)	Nondescripts	7-24	Impala

10 December 2016	KCB	41–8	Bulls

10 December 2016	Machine	3–43	Kabras

10 December 2016	Mwamba	10–10	Nakuru

=== Week 7 ===
14 January 2017	Nondescripts	30–12	Blak Blad

14 January 2017	Strathmore	14–29	Impala

14 January 2017	Nakuru	10–28	KCB

14 January 2017	Mwamba	32–37	Kabras

14 January 2017	Homeboyz	15–10	Harlequins

14 January 2017	Machine	19–29	Bulls

=== Week 8 ===
21 January 2017	KCB	70–0	Machine

21 January 2017	Kabras	17–29	Nakuru

21 January 2017	Bulls	13–26	Mwamba

21 January 2017	Impala	13–41	Homeboyz

21 January 2017	Harlequins	38–22	Nondescripts

21 January 2017	Blak Blad	23–7	Strathmore

=== Week 9 ===
25 February 2017 (postponed)	Homeboyz	32-16	Blak Blad	Jamhuri Park
14:00

28 January 2017	KCB	22-17	Kabras	KCB Sports Club
16:00		report

28 January 2017	Nakuru	33-20	Bulls	Nakuru Athletic Club
16:00

28 January 2017	Machine	7-24	Mwamba	UoN Grounds
16:00

28 January 2017	Harlequins	36-22	Impala	RFUEA Grounds
16:00		report

28 January 2017	Nondescripts	32-12	Strathmore	RFUEA Grounds
16:15		report

=== Week 10 ===
4 February 2017	Impala	46-6	Machina	RFUEA Grounds
14:00

4 February 2017	Kabras	31-15	Nondescripts	Kakamega Showground
16:00

4 February 2017	KCB	47-0	Blak Blad	KCB Sports Club
16:00

4 February 2017	Nakuru	16-3	Strathmore	Nakuru Athletic Club
16:00

4 February 2017	Homeboyz	28-17	Mwamba	Jamhuri Park
16:00

4 February 2017	Harlequins	31-16	Bulls	RFUEA Grounds
16:15

=== Week 11 ===
11 February 2017	Bulls	15-17	Impala	Kakamega High School
16:00

11 February 2017	Mwamba	15-7	Harlequins	Railway Club
16:00

11 February 2017	Machine	0-38	Homeboyz	UoN Grounds
16:00

11 February 2017	Blak Blad	14-42	Kabras	Kenyatta University
16:00

11 February 2017	Strathmore	15-50	KCB	Madaraka
16:00

11 February 2017	Nondescripts	12-20	Nakuru	Jamhuri Park
16:00

=== Week 12 ===
18 February 2017	Kabras	35-17	Strathmore	Kakamega Showground
16:00

18 February 2017	KCB	24-33	Homeboyz	KCB Sports Club
16:00

18 February 2017	Bulls	30-18	Nondescripts	Kakamega High School
16:00

18 February 2017	Impala	40-33	Mwamba	Impala Club
16:00

18 February 2017	Harlequins	33-14	Nakuru	RFUEA Grounds
16:00

18 February 2017	Machine	16-10	Blak Blad	UoN Grounds
16:00

=== Week 13 ===
4 March 2017	KCB	27-8	Nondescripts	KCB Sports Park
14:00

4 March 2017	Nakuru	21-17	Impala	Nakuru Athletic Club
16:00

4 March 2017	Machine	15-17	Harlequins	UoN Grounds
16:00

4 March 2017	Mwamba	22-16	Blak Blad	Railway Club
16:00

4 March 2017	Strathmore	27-24	Bulls	Madaraka
16:00

4 March 2017	Homeboyz	34-22	Kabras	Jamhuri Park
16:15

=== Week 14 ===
11 March 2017	Kabras	13-19	Harlequins	Kakamega Showground
16:00

11 March 2017	Bulls	26-36	Homeboyz	Kakamega High School
16:00

11 March 2017	Mwamba	33-0	Nondescripts	Railway Club
16:00

11 March 2017	Impala	27-24	KCB	Impala Club
16:00

11 March 2017	Blak Blad	11-29	Nakuru	Kenyatta University
16:00

11 March 2017	Strathmore	5-26	Machine	Madaraka
16:15

=== Week 15 ===
18 March 2017	Kabras	29-26	Impala	Kakamega Showground
16:00

18 March 2017	Harlequins	26-29	KCB	RFUEA Ground
16:00

18 March 2017	Nakuru	17-44	Homeboyz	Nakuru Athletic Club
16:00

18 March 2017	Strathmore	5-18	Mwamba	Madaraka
16:00

18 March 2017	Bulls	15-22	Blak Blad	Kakamega High School
16:00

18 March 2017	Nondescripts	39-12	Machine	Jamhuri Park
16:0

=== Week 16 ===
25 March 2017	Harlequins	72-5	Strathmore
16:00

25 March 2017	Kabras	30-14	Bulls
16:00

25 March 2017	Nakuru	21-14	Machine
16:00		report

25 March 2017	Impala	57-18	Blak Blad
16:00

25 March 2017	Homeboyz	28-28	Nondescripts
16:00

25 March 2017	KCB	25-18	Mwamba
		report

== Playoffs ==
=== Top Six Playoffs ===
1 April 2017

Harlequins	32-31	Mwamba

1 April 2017

Impala	12-18	Kabras

=== Semi-finals ===
8 April 2017

Homeboyz	17-22	Kabras

8 April 2017

KCB	19-12	Harlequins

=== Final ===
22 April 2017

KCB	36-8	Kabras

== Attendances ==
The average attendance was 157.

#	Rugby union club	Average attendance
1	Homeboyz RFC	205
2	KCB RFC	196
3	Kenya Harlequin	185
4	Impala Saracens	177
5	Kabras Sugar RFC	169
6	Mwamba RFC	160
7	Nakuru RFC	151
8	Nondescripts RFC	143
9	Strathmore University RFC	135
10	Blak Blad RFC	128
11	Western Bulls RFC	120
12	Mean Machine RFC	113
