= Rugby union in East Africa =

Rugby union in East Africa is almost entirely an amateur sport. It has been played in the three East African nations (Kenya, Tanzania and Uganda) for more than a century; the first recorded match taking place in 1909, though it was almost certainly being played for several years prior to this. There are many club and school teams, the oldest of which were established in Colonial times.

There are three national teams within East Africa (Kenya, Tanzania and Uganda) and also a multinational team (East Africa) that draws its players from these three nations. This team plays games at home against incoming touring sides and also conducts tours to other rugby playing nations (during which they play under the Tuskers moniker).

== Early history ==
Several universities and Royal Navy ships sent teams to tour East Africa prior to the Second World War.

The first was H.M.S. Southampton (1922), closely followed by H.M.S. Colombo (1923) and then (frequently more than once over the next decade) His Majesty's Ships Cairo, Chatham, Effingham and Enterprise. This latter vessel was to provide a lasting memento of its visits by presenting the Enterprise Cup to the union in 1928; a trophy that has been the object of competition between clubs in the region ever since.

The Combined South African Universities toured in 1929 and in 1935 Danie Craven captained Stellenbosch University on a tour of the region.

== The Unions ==
The first union in British East Africa was the Rugby Football Union of Kenya (RFU-K), founded in August 1921 (although it did not become effective until 1923 with the formation of the first two Nairobi clubs - Nondescripts R.F.C. and Harlequins R.F.C.); it was responsible for the administration of the game throughout Kenya, Uganda and Tanganyika which it carried out through various district sub-unions throughout the region.

In 1953 the Rugby Football Union of East Africa (RFUEA) was created in order to take over the mantle as the umbrella organisation for rugby in the region. The creation of the RFUEA allowed for the formation of the Tanganyika Rugby Football Union (T.R.F.U.) in 1954 and Uganda Rugby Football Union (U.R.F.U.) in 1955. Each of these were essentially a sub-union of the RFUEA much as the district unions in Kenya were, so the RFU-K was dissolved in 1956 allowing the already existing district unions to deal directly with the RFUEA.

== The clubs and the rugby playing schools ==
Among the rugby clubs in Uganda is Kampala Old Boys (KOBS), founded in 1963. The club plays its home matches at Kampala Rugby Union Football Club and competes in national rugby competitions, including seven-a-side, ten-a-side, and fifteen-a-side tournaments. As of 2014, KOBS had won nearly 50 titles. The club was coached by Fred Mudoola, captained by Brian Odongo, and won the 2013–14 National League championship. The club's chairman was Adrian Bukenya.

The club has always associated itself with Namilyango College and other rugby playing secondary schools from where it picks talented students who are nurtured to become club and national stalwarts. The club has in the past produced greats such as Yayiro Kasasa, Allan Musoke, Timothy Mudoola, Fred Mudoola, Mike Wandera, Tony Luggya, Victor Kalimugogo, Victor Wadia.

Biggest wins/losses
Biggest win KOBS 152 - LIRA BULLS 00
Biggest loss KOBS 05 - HEATHENS 42

KOBS Captains
Early 1980s David Nsubuga (RIP)
Mid 1980s Edward Kitaka Kizito (RIP)
1990 Yayiro Kasasa
1992 Arthur Mugweri
1997 Simon Olok
1998 Martin Kasasira
1999 Michael Wandera
2000-2001 Victor Kalimugogo
2002 Michael Wandera
2003 Nathan Wasolo
2004-2005 Fred Mudoola
2006 Timothy Mudoola
2007-2008 Adrian Bukenya
2009 Timothy Mudoola
2010-Todate Brian Odong

Club Chairmen
1990's Edward Kitaka Kizito
2003 Philip Karugaba
2005 Martin Kasasira
2006-2007 Nathan Wasolo
2008-2009 Arthur Mugweri
2010-2011 Martin Kasasira
2012 Nathan Wasolo
2013-To date Adrian Bukenya

Other notable clubs in Uganda are Heathens, the second most successful club, Makerere Impis, Black Pirates and Rhinos.
