= Rugby Roma Olimpic =

Italian rugby union team

(Italy) Rugby Roma Olimpic Club 1930
- Full name: Rugby Roma Olimpic Club 1930 ar.l.
- Union: FIR
- Founded: 1930; 96 years ago
- Location: Rome, Italy
- Ground: Stadio Tre Fontane (Capacity: 4,000)
- President: Alberto Emett
- League: Serie B
| Team kit | 2nd kit |

Official website
- www.rugbyroma.it

The Rugby Roma Olimpic Club 1930 is an Italian rugby union team, based in Rome. The club won 5 Italian titles, in 1935, 1937, 1948, 1949 and 2000, the Coppa Italia in 1998 and 2011 and competed in 58 editions of the Italian top tier championship (now, the Top12) from his foundation in 1930 as Rugby Roma.

From 1969 to 2011 Rugby Roma's home ground was the Stadio Tre Fontane, located in the Roman South-western suburb of EUR.

In the last 2010–11 Excellence season Rugby Roma Olimpic's head coaches were Danie de Villiers and Jaco Stoumann led the team to conquer the Excellence Trophy.

In 2011 the club is disbanded. In the same year the name is changed to Rugby Roma Olimpic 1930, but without participating in any league. In 2015 the new Rugby Roma Olimpic Club 1930 compete in 2015–16 Serie C season, conquering the promotion to Serie B. The club currently plays in Serie B.

== History ==
The Rugby Roma was founded on 21 October 1930, from the ashes of A.S. Roma Rugby (1929) and S.S. Lazio Rugby (1927), clubs associated with the football clubs of the Italian capital, when, after two seasons bankruptcy, under the management of the football clubs the decision was taken to form a separate organisation devoted to rugby. The colours adopted were those of the Club Atlético San Isidro: black and white.

The new team were soon successful, winning the Italian championship in the 1934–35 season and again in 1936–37, before financial difficulties restricted ambitions during the war years. In 1937 the team is incorporated into A.S. Roma and reconstituted in 1940 like Amatori Rugby Roma.

In 1945 the club returns to the name of Rugby Roma for a year before merging with the Olympic '44 (a rugby club based in Rome) and become Rugby Roma Olimpic. This resurgent post war team were champions again in 1947–48 and 1948–49, before further lean years throughout the 1950s and 1960s, during which the team were relegated.

The subsequent years saw the arrival of a new coach Dick Greenwood during the 1970s. The club also toured East Africa in 1976, playing games against teams like East Africa and Scorpions RFC. Rugby Roma Olimpic qualified for the Italian playoffs in 1985, before further difficulties resulted in another relegation.

The next boom period led to All Blacks imports, victory in the Coppa Italia in 1998 and a fifth Italian championship in 2000 before yet another financial crisis resulted in relegation once more.

In the last 2010–11 Excellence season Rugby Roma Olimpic's head coaches were Danie de Villiers and Jaco Stoumann led the team to conquer the Excellence Trophy. In 2011 the club is disbanded. In the same year the name is changed to Rugby Roma Olimpic 1930, but without participating in any league.

In 2015 the new Rugby Roma Olimpic Club 1930 compete in 2015–16 Serie C season, conquering the promotion to Serie B. The club currently plays in Serie B.

== Honours ==
- Italian championship
  - Champions (5): 1934–35, 1936–37, 1947–48, 1948–49, 1999–2000
  - Runners-up (2): 1930–31, 1945–46
- Coppa Italia
  - Champions (1): 1998/99
  - Runners-up (1): 1970–71
- Excellence Trophy
  - Champions (1): 2010–11
