= Dick Greenwood =

England international rugby union player (born 1940)

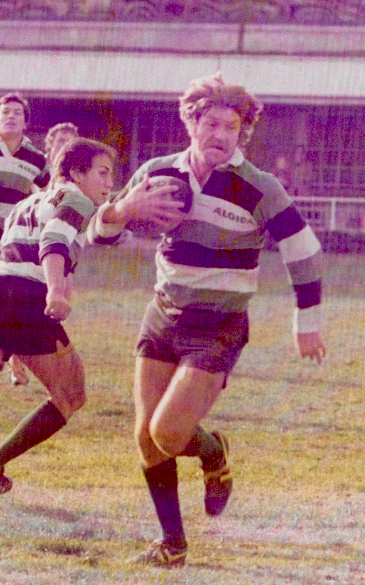
- Born: John Richard Heaton Greenwood; 11 September 1940 (age 86) Chorley, Lancashire, England
- School: Merchant Taylors' School, Crosby
- University: Emmanuel College, Cambridge University
- Notable relative: Will Greenwood (son)

Rugby union career
- Position: Flanker
Amateur team(s)
Years	Team	Apps	(Points)
1958–1972	Waterloo		
1962–1963	Cambridge University		
1973	Scorpions RFC		
1973–1976	Rugby Roma		
- Lancashire
International career
Years	Team	Apps	(Points)
1966–1969	England	5	(3)
- Correct as of 26 March 2020
Coaching career
- Years: Team
- 1983–1985: England

John Richard Heaton Greenwood OBE (born 11 September 1940) is an English former rugby union player and coach. A flanker, he played for Waterloo, Cambridge University, Lancashire and England. He later coached Preston Grasshoppers and England.

== Biography ==
Greenwood was born in Chorley in Lancashire. He was educated at Merchant Taylors' School, Crosby and at Emmanuel College, Cambridge.

He played for Waterloo, Cambridge University and Lancashire.

In 1966 he made his debut for England against Ireland at Twickenham. In total he won five international caps until 1969, serving as captain in his last game, again against Ireland. He never won a game for England, drawing one and losing four.

In 1973 he was sent to Kenya by the Rugby Football Union on a coaching assignment, and while there was selected to play for The Scorpions, an East African invitation team. After this assignment he moved to Italy to play for Rugby Roma from 1973 to 1976, becoming the Italian Championship's best try scorer in 1974 and 1975. So enamoured had he been by his time in Kenya that he persuaded his Italian club to tour East Africa in 1976.

After retiring from playing he coached Preston Grasshoppers. He was coach of England from 1983 to 1985, an unsuccessful period for the national team.

He remained president of Waterloo after his retirement. He is also involved in rugby league, serving as chairman and coaching the junior sides of Prestatyn and Rhyl Panthers since 2011, and is (as of 2015) on the board of directors of Wales Rugby League.

Greenwood was appointed Officer of the Order of the British Empire (OBE) in the 2017 Birthday Honours for services to rugby.

== Personal life ==
Outside rugby, Greenwood was the Assistant Bursar and a geography teacher and head of rugby at Stonyhurst College.

Greenwood and his wife Sue have three children: one daughter and two sons, one of whom is Will Greenwood, who also played rugby for England. Sue is a retired teacher who taught mathematics at Stonyhurst St Mary's Hall for over two decades.

Greenwood caused embarrassment for Preston Grasshoppers Rugby Club in November 2021 when he arranged for Nigel Farage to speak at a sportsmen's dinner at the club. When the club found out that Farage was speaking, they cancelled the event. However, the story was covered widely by the national press after members tweeted that they were cutting up their membership cards in protest at the club being associated with Farage.

Sporting positions
Preceded by Mike Weston	English National Rugby Union Captain; 1969	Succeeded by Budge Rogers
