= Glengarth Sevens =

English annual rugby sevens tournament

The Glengarth Sevens, also written as Glengarth 7s, was an annual rugby sevens tournament held by Stockport R.U.F.C, then called the Davenport Rugby Club, in Stockport, United Kingdom. The first Glengarth Sevens was held in 1967 at the Memorial Ground, their rugby field located on Headlands Road in Bramhall. It celebrated its 21st anniversary in 1988, which was to be the last Glengarth Sevens held at Davenport Rugby Club.

== History ==
In June 1966 the North East Cheshire Society for Mentally Handicapped Children opened their day care centre Glengarth House in Station Road, Marple, Stockport. As a number of the children who attended lived in Bramhall, a Bramhall sub-committee of the society was formed with one of its main objectives being fundraising. At the time, a member of the Bramhall sub-committee, Michael Hodgson, was Captain of Davenport Rugby Club.

The club was approached through then President Norman Harris, by George Jackson and Michael Hodgson with the preposition of organising an annual seven-a-side rugby competition. Jackson promised that he could get David Watkins, then of Newport RFC and the 'Prince of all Sevens Players' to bring a side for the first tournament. It was decided to form a joint committee to organise the event and so the 'Glengarth Sevens' were born.

Eric Evans of England Rugby International was invited to become president and remained until the disbandment of the club. The England players of his era rated Eric as "the finest Captain they had played under" and the team went on to win the Grand Slam in 1957 and Triple Crown in 1958.

The tournament had a number of sponsors, having Davenport Rugby Club be responsible for most of their budget. The members of the club worked to make the Glengarth Sevens a national success and a respected seven-a-side rugby tournament. The 21 years of the Glengarth Sevens raised more than £60,000.

A number of teams and players entered the Glengarth Sevens. Players like David Watkins, Andy Irvine, Les Cusworth, Phil Bennett, Peter Winterbottom, Steve Smith, Fran Cotton and many others; teams like Orrell, who won the competition eight times, and guest sides such as the Public School Wanderers, who won it four times.

One time British and Irish Lions Captain, Willie John McBride ran onto the Davenport's 1st XV pitch with a lion cub from Longleat.

Stockport Rugby Club "recreated" the Glengarth Sevens in June 2012 with the 'Stockport 7s'.

== Previous winners of the Glengarth Sevens ==
Main Event
1967 - David Watkins Seven
1968 - Loughborough University
1969 - Croeso '69
1970 - Loughborough University
1971 - Orrell
1972 - Orrell
1973 - Public School Wanderers
1974 - Orrell
1975 - Orrell
1976 - Orrell
1977 - Sale
1978 - Welsh Select Seven
1979 - Public School Wanderers
1980 - Orrell
1981 - Orrell
1982 - Blackheath
1983 - Public School Wanderers
1984 - Public School Wanderers
1985 - Orrell
1986 - Waterloo

Davenport Plate
1967 - St. Helens
1968 - Sale
1969 - Wilmslow
1970 - Wilmslow
1971 - Middlesbrough
1972 - St. Helens
1973 - Lymm
1974 - Manchester
1975 - Wakefield
1976 - Fylde
1977 - Wilmslow
1978 - Anti-Assassins
1979 - Orrell
1980 - Public School Wanderers
1981 - Public School Wanderers
1982 - Public School Wanderers
1983 - Blackheath
1984 - Selkirk
1985 - Sale
1986 - Harlequins
