= Charles Burton (journalist) =

English journalist and sportswriter

Charles Burton was an English journalist and sportswriter. He was the founder of the Public School Wanderers Club and also of the National Schools Sevens (hosted by Rosslyn Park F.C.), which were inaugurated in 1939. This is the biggest seven-a-side tournament in the world, attracting more than 300 school teams and over 3,500 schoolchildren from all over the world.
