= Peter Stagg =

Zambia, British Lions & Scotland international rugby union player (born 1941)

- Born: Peter Kidner Stagg; 22 November 1941 (age 84) Twickenham, England
- Height: 6 ft 10 in (2.08 m)

Rugby union career
- Position: Lock
Amateur team(s)
Years	Team	Apps	(Points)
- Sale
International career
Years	Team	Apps	(Points)
1965-1970	Scotland	28	(0)
1968	British Lions	3	(0)
1975	Zambia		

Peter Kidner Stagg (born 22 November 1941) is a Scottish former international rugby union player and the son of James Stagg, the senior meteorologist adviser for Operation Overlord, the D-Day landings in Normandy. Peter Stagg was capped twenty-eight times as a lock for Scotland between 1965 and 1970, including one cap as a replacement.

Stagg was selected for the 1968 British Lions tour to South Africa and played in three of the four internationals against South Africa.

He played club rugby for Sale and was also invited to play with the Anti-Assassins rugby team, a side based in Cumbria in the north of England that played charity and friendly matches at home and abroad.

In 1975 he was living in Zambia and playing rugby for the Ndola Wanderers RFC when the East African touring side the Tuskers visited. He played for Zambia in their first ever international on 31 August 1975 at Kitwe.

Although billed as 6 ft 7.5 in (2.019 m) tall, there was a suggestion that Stagg was nearly six inches (15 cm) taller than his usual partner in the Scotland second row, Mike Campbell-Lamerton, who was himself about 6 ft 4.5 in (1.943 m).
