= Denzil Williams =

British Lions & Wales international rugby union footballer

- Born: Denzil Williams; 17 October 1938 (age 88) Trefil, Blaenau Gwent, Wales
- Occupation(s): steelworker, brewery rep.

Rugby union career
- Position: Prop
Amateur team(s)
Years	Team	Apps	(Points)
- Tredegar RFC
–	Ebbw Vale RFC		
–	Vichy		
–	Barbarian F.C.		
International career
Years	Team	Apps	(Points)
1963–1971	Wales	36	(3)
1966	British Lions	5	(0)

Denzil Williams (born 17 October 1938) is a former Wales international rugby union player. He was capped 36 times for Wales between 1963 and 1971, including Wales' first overseas tour in 1964. He played in the Welsh rugby team's first match outside Europe and its first in the Southern Hemisphere; played against East Africa in Nairobi on 12 May 1964, Wales winning 8-26. He was also selected fives times for the British & Irish Lions in 1966. His first international match was in the Five Nations tournament on 19 January 1963. Williams also played club rugby for Ebbw Vale.
