= W. B. Young =

Scotland & East Africa international rugby union player

William Young
- Born: William Brewitt Young; 7 May 1916 Ardrossan, Scotland
- Died: 25 April 2013 (aged 96) Sevenoaks, England

Rugby union career
- Position: No. 8
Amateur team(s)
Years	Team	Apps	(Points)
- King's College Hospital
–	London Scottish		
Provincial / State sides
Years	Team	Apps	(Points)
1938	Scotland Probables		
International career
Years	Team	Apps	(Points)
1937-48	Scotland	10	(3)
1949-50	East Africa	3	

William Brewitt Young (7 May 1916 – 25 April 2013) was a Scotland national rugby union team player. He later played for the representative East Africa multi-national side.

== Rugby Union career ==
=== Amateur career ===
Young played rugby union for King's College Hospital before then playing for London Scottish.

=== Provincial career ===
He was supposed to play for the Scotland Probables in the first trial match of season 1937-38. The match due on 18 December 1937 was called off due to frost despite the contingency of straw being placed on The Greenyards pitch at Melrose. He did however turn out for the Scotland Probables side for the second and final trial match of that season, on 15 January 1938.

=== International career ===
He was capped ten times for Scotland between 1937–48 and three times for East Africa between 1949 and 1950. Along with Maurice Daly of Ireland, he is one of only two people to have been capped by a major rugby playing nation and by East Africa.

Along with W.C.W. Murdoch, he was one of only two Scottish players to be capped on either side of World War II, giving him one of the longest international careers on record. John "Jack" Heaton and Thomas Arthur "Tommy" Kemp also achieved this feat for England.

== Medical career ==
He attended City of London School and studied medicine at St Catharine's College, Cambridge. and became a doctor after he finished playing rugby.

== Family ==
Young was the son of Alexander Robert Young (born c1885 Govan, Lanarkshire Scotland) and Christina Leiper (born c1883 Lanark, Lanarkshire).
