= RFUEA Ground =

Rugby union stadium in Kenya

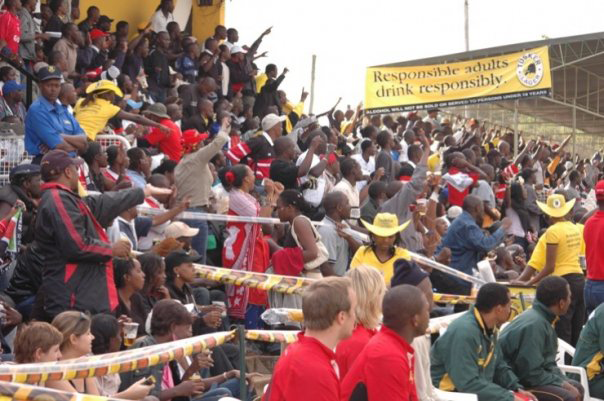
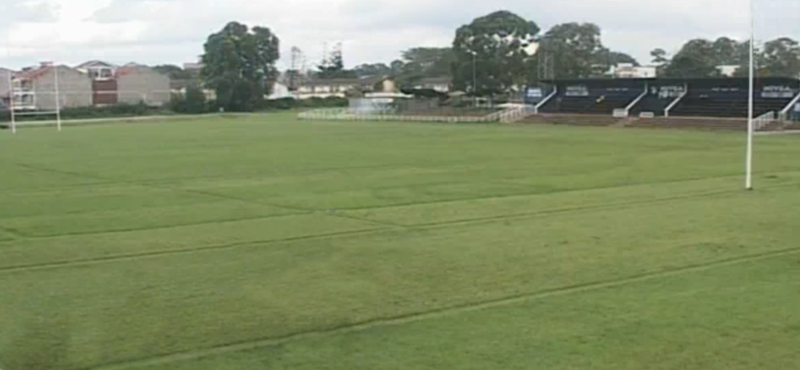
- Spectators at the annual Safari Sevens View from the north end of the ground
- Interactive map of RFUEA Ground
- Location: Ngong Road, Nairobi, Kenya
- Coordinates: 1°18′05″S 36°46′17″E
- Owner: Rugby Football Union of East Africa (RFUEA)
- Operator: Kenya Rugby Football Union (KRFU)
- Capacity: 6,000; Expandable to 15,000
- Surface: Grass
- Field size: 130×69 m

Construction
- Groundbreaking: 1953
- Built: 1954–1955
- Opened: 28 September 1955
- Architect: John Tanner

Tenants
- Kenya national rugby union team Kenya Harlequins

The RFUEA Ground is a rugby union stadium located on the Ngong Road in Nairobi, Kenya. It was purpose built to be the home of the national team and to serve as the headquarters of the Rugby Football Union of Kenya (RFUK).^{[a]} Coincidentally, the RFUEA ground has another parallel with Twickenham Stadium in the United Kingdom in that it also serves as the home ground for the Kenya Harlequin Football Club, just as their sister club the London Harlequins once played at Twickenham.

Many internationally renowned teams have played here including the British Lions (1955 & 1962), the Barbarians (1958), the Springboks(1961) and Wales (1964). The 2009 IRB Junior World Rugby Trophy took place on this site (with some games also being played on the neighbouring Impala RFC ground). As the site for one of the largest and most prestigious annual sevens tournaments in Africa, the Safari Sevens, the RFUEA ground has hosted matches between such diverse teams as Samoa, Emerging Springboks, Zimbabwe, British Army, Public School Wanderers, Bristol University and Université de Grenoble.

At an altitude of 1,650 metres (5,410 ft) above sea-level, it is higher than three of the four vaunted stadia of South Africa's highveld; Loftus Versfeld Stadium Pretoria at 1,214 metres (3,983 ft), the Free State Stadium Bloemfontein 1,400 metres (4,600 ft) and Royal Bafokeng Stadium Rustenburg 1,500 metres (4,900 ft). Only Ellis Park in Johannesburg at 1,750 metres (5,740 ft) is higher.

== Planning ==
In the early days of rugby in East Africa, when major games were to be staged and larger than normal crowds were expected, Parklands Sports Club (the then home of Nondescripts RFC) served as the venue. But by 1949 attendance for these events had swelled and other venues had to be rented by the Union to facilitate them. The African Stadium (now Nairobi City Stadium) was most frequently used, though Mitchell Park Stadium (now Jamhuri Park Stadium) was the venue for the match against the Combined (Oxford and Cambridge) Universities touring team of 1951.

It had been apparent to the RFUEA, that renting facilities was not ideal and, in the long term, would cost more money and provide fewer options than would ownership of a dedicated facility. Indeed, the idea that East African rugby should have its own ground and headquarters was first put forward in 1930 and these early plans even went as far as identifying and inspecting a parcel of land in the Westlands area of Nairobi. Records do not indicate why this plan did not ultimately see the light of day.

By the beginning of the 1950s however, the required motivation, determination, expertise and good fortune were in conjunction and the Union was able to construct the stadium, and within ten years, RFUEA had saved enough money that it was able that it was able to begin loaning money to member clubs for the upgrading of their own grounds.

== Funding ==
In 1951 the Kenya government granted the union the 10-acre (40,000 m^{2}) plot of bundu (rough ground) adjacent to the Ngong Road. Individuals and clubs donated money and sweepstakes and dances were held by the member clubs in order to raise further funds. Life seats were also sold that entitle the holders to free entry to all rugby union matches at the ground, and a seat in the central section of the main stand, for life. Additionally a 10-year loan of £7,500 stg. was obtained from the Rugby Football Union (RFU) after 40 members of the Rugby Patrons Society provided personal guarantees; ten guarantors provided surety for £300 and a further 30 for £100 each which, in 1951 when £300 was equivalent to average annual earnings in the UK, was a considerable statement of support.

This loan had been secured by D.M. Goldstein (then President of both the RFUEA and Kenya Harlequins) whilst on leave in the United Kingdom. It was the first loan ever made by the RFU to an overseas union. There is an apocryphal story that it was paid off in three years by the simple expedient of taking out rain insurance with some London based companies; if more than an inch of rain fell in each year the policies would pay out. Not so much buying insurance as placing a bet, and in betting terms this would be a racing certainty. Unfortunately the story is not true, insurance companies have never been so naïve concerning weather conditions in tropical climes. In fact the loan and its interest was repaid entirely from the annual subscriptions of the members of the Rugby Patrons Society.

Kenya Harlequins, the tenant club, and Impala RFC, on the neighbouring ground, between them paid for the drilling of a bore-hole on the Impala grounds, the water from this well being used to irrigate the pitches on both grounds.

== Design and construction ==
The grading of the ground (carried out primarily by John Webster who donated hours of his time to driving the bulldozer) was carried out towards the end of 1953 but the grass planted for the short rains that year failed. The grass was re-planted in time for the long rains of 1954 and that crop was successful. The next step was to erect the 60 foot (18 m) goal-posts, in order to serve as a visual advertisement that something was happening, and to fence in the ground to prevent damage by livestock and casual pedestrians across the pitch. Bougainvillia shrubs were laid along the fence, four rows of trees were planted on the Eastern side of the ground to act as a windbreak and the car-park was levelled.

The Stadium was designed by John Tanner (Kenya Harlequins and East Africa) and the building works were carried out by a firm belonging to a member of the Rugby Patrons Society at a very reasonable cost. The stadium and the majority of the seating was placed on the western side of the ground such that in the early evening (when matches are normally played in East Africa) the spectators are not looking into the sun. The pavilion was designed for easy expansion; it consisted originally of two changing-rooms, showers, toilets, a small bar, seating for 200 and housing for the family of the custodian/bar-man. Within ten years it had been expanded to include a full-sized bar, committee-room, kitchen, seating for 3,000 and a camera-tower/broadcasting-box on the roof of the main stand. In recent years the changing facilities have been further expanded.

On the eastern side of the ground an earthen mound runs along the length of the touch-line and there is a tier of five rows of simple stepped seats constructed from breeze-block material and concrete. This simple form of seating is replicated on the western touch-line and it is above this that the main stadium sits. The pavilion consists of three sections, the northern and southern sections, each approximately 30m wide, are larger than the central life-members' section which is approximately 10m wide. All three of these sections have seven rows of seating on wooden staging and are covered by corrugated asbestos roofing. Either side of the main pavilion are a further six rows of concrete benches which in recent years have been covered with a mabati (corrugated metal) roof.

== Opening ==
The first match played at the ground was East Africa versus the British Lions on 28 September 1955. It attracted a gate (with borrowed seating) of 6,000 and J.A.E. Siggins, the manager of the Lions, was given the honour of opening the ground in the presence of His Excellency Sir Evelyn Baring, the Governor of Kenya.

== Upgrading ==
In October 2009 the Rugby Patrons Society donated KSh.1.2 million/= (equal to £10,600 stg., €11,800 or US$16,000) to the KRFU thus providing 60% of the funds required to sink a borehole in order to ensure that the pitch can be maintained in excellent condition. Then on 29 May 2010, the Safaricom foundation gave KSh.13.2 million/= (equal to £123,000 stg., €143,000 or US$177,000) to the KRFU for the rehabilitation and expansion of the ground to seat an additional 1,500 people on a brand new terrace on the Ngong Road side of the ground. The Kenya Rugby Football Union plans to purchase an adjacent plot, the Unga grounds, so that the stadium can be expanded to accommodate 20,000 people with state-of-the-art facilities. It is the intention of the Ground Development Committee to create a venue that will enable Kenya to host a major International Rugby Board event in the near future.

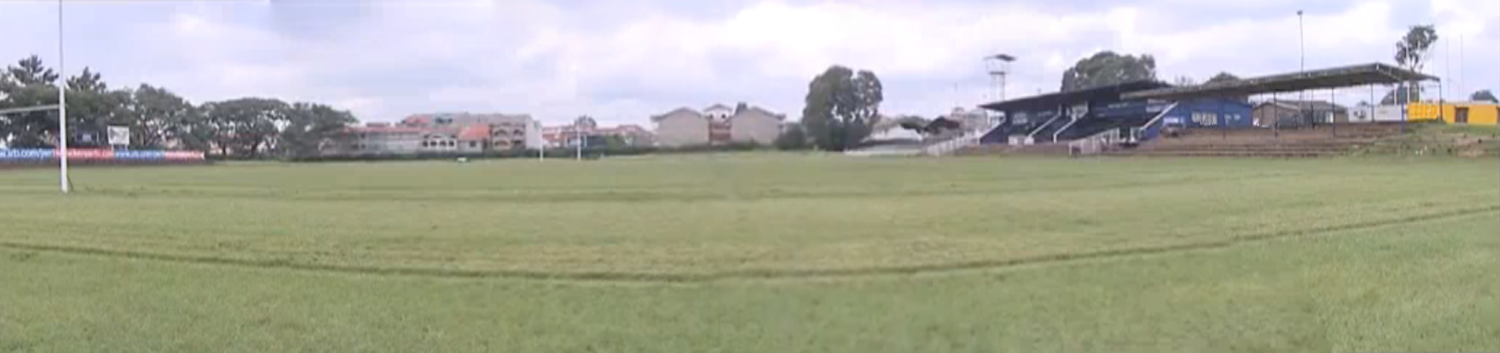
Panorama of the RFUEA Ground facing south.

== Notes ==
a. The RFUK was dissolved in 1953 with the formation of the Rugby Football Union of East Africa (RFUEA); the current Kenya Rugby Football Union (KRFU) was not formed until 1970.
