= Kenya Regiment =

Territorial Army unit in British Kenya

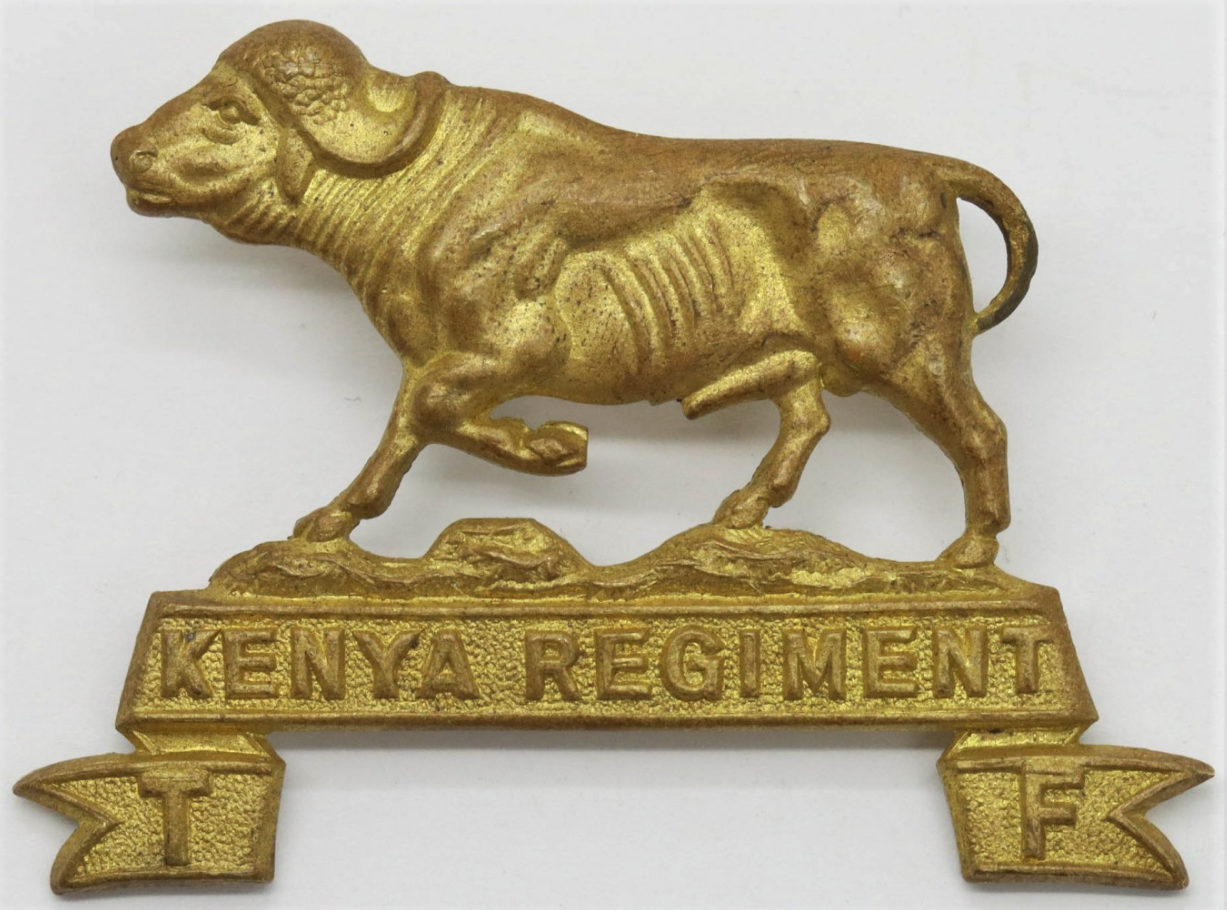
- Regimental badge, showing a charging cape buffalo
- Active: 1937–1939; 1950–1963
- Country: Kenya Colony; Uganda Protectorate
- Allegiance: British Empire
- Branch: Territorial Army
- Colours: Brown, red and green
- Engagements: Mau Mau Uprising

The Kenya Regiment was a unit of the British Army recruited primarily among white settlers in Kenya and to a lesser extent Uganda. Formed in 1937, it was disbanded at the outbreak of World War II in 1939. It was reformed in 1950 and participated in the suppression of the Mau Mau uprising (1952–56). It was finally disbanded on Kenyan independence in May 1963.

== History ==
The British colonial administrations in East Africa relied throughout their existence predominantly on military units recruited among Africans and commanded by Europeans. The various units were consolidated into the King's African Rifles in 1902. In 1907 the idea of a white settler defence force was discussed. The "Kenya Defence Force" was eventually established under the Defence Force Ordinance 1928. The Ordinance "made provision for the compulsory registration of all European males of British nationality in the Colony up to the age of fifty years and for their division into three classes according to age. However, those over fifty could also enrol in a fourth class." After questions were raised about control of weapons and potential settler threats to the Kenya Government in 1936, the Force was disbanded and replaced by the Kenya Regiment, formed 1 June 1937. Its creation was partly intended as a means to control settlers' political aspirations.

The Kenya Regiment was formed in the aftermath of the Abyssinia Crisis (1935). Fearing an Italian threat to the British colonies in East Africa, the Colonial Office ordered the reform of the military units in Kenya Colony. A section of the Territorial Army was established for white settlers to complement the long-established King's African Rifles (KAR) which comprised black soldiers under white officers. It was originally designated Kenya Regiment (Territorial Force) and subsequently expanded, also recruiting white settlers in Uganda Protectorate. At the outbreak of World War II in 1939, the unit's personnel were re-allocated to the KAR and Northern Rhodesia Regiment. Kenya Regiment soldiers also formed the basis for the creation of the Kenya Armoured Car Regiment.

The regiment was recalled in 1950 and participated in the suppression of the Mau Mau Uprising (1952–56). 1,800 men served with the Kenya Regiment of whom about 300 served in the KAR. According to the historian Huw Bennett, "the army high command only partially managed to impose discipline on the Kenya Regiment, and relied upon them for local knowledge". 31 of its members were killed during the conflict. The regiment was disbanded with the independence of Kenya in 1963.

== Notable personnel ==
- Roger Whittaker, singer and songwriter, national service, 1954–56.

== Regimental Colours ==
King's Colour of the Kenya Regiment prior to disbandment

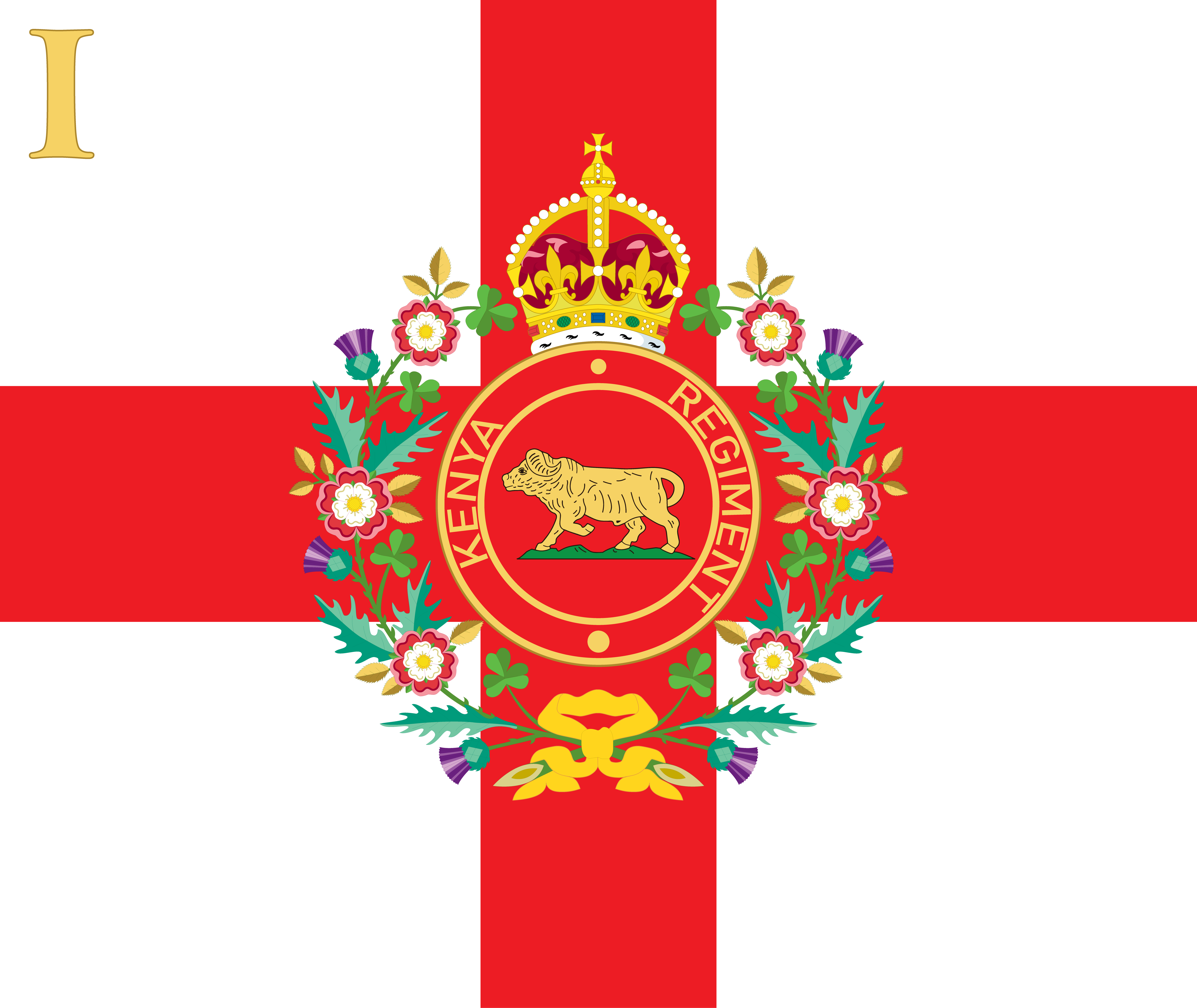
Regimental Colour of the Kenya Regiment prior to disbandment

== Bibliography ==
- Bennett, Huw (2013). Fighting the Mau Mau: The British Army and Counter-Insurgency in the Kenya Emergency. Cambridge University Press. ISBN 978-1-107-02970-5.
- Guy Campbell The Charging Buffalo: A History of the Kenya Regiment 1937–1963 (London: Leo Cooper, 1986) ISBN 0-436-08290-X
- Leonard Gill, Military Musings (Victoria, BC: Trafford, 2003)
- Leonard Gill, More Military Musings (Victoria, BC: Trafford, 2004)
- Leonard Gill, Remembering the Regiment (Victoria, BC: Trafford, 2004)
- Ian Parker, The Last Colonial Regiment. History of Kenya Regiment (T.F.) ISBN 190677515X
- Duder, C. J. D. (1991). "An Army of One's Own: The Politics of the Kenya Defence Force". Canadian Journal of African Studies. 25 (2): 207–225. doi:10.2307/485217. ISSN 0008-3968. JSTOR 485217.
