= Old Georgian Club =

- Full name: Old Georgian Club
- Nicknames: Dragón
- Headquarters: Palermo, Buenos Aires
- Ground: Quilmes, Greater Buenos Aires
- Founded: 28 April 1908; 117 years ago
- Club colors: (White, Red, Navy Blue)
- Activities: Basketball; Field hockey Football; Rugby union
- President: Ann Foster
- Website: oldgeorgianclub.com.ar

Old Georgian Club is an Argentine sports club. Although headquartered in Buenos Aires, most of Old Georgian's facilities and venue are located on Quilmes. Founded in 1908 by alumni of St. George's College of Quilmes, the club sees itself as a pillar of Buenos Aires' British community.

The rugby union team currently competes in Primera C, the fourth division of the URBA league system, while its field hockey teams are affiliated to the Buenos Aires Hockey Association. Other sections of the club are basketball, and football.

In cricket, Old Georgian was member of the Argentine Cricket Association and played in the national league. Many old Georgians have played for the Argentina national team.

== History ==
Rugby kit

On April 28, 1908, the headmaster of St. George's college Joseph Stevenson, and sixteen alumni established Old Georgian Club. The rugby team entered the River Plate Rugby Union Championship (current Argentine Rugby Union) in 1935, winning the 1937, 1938 and 1939 championships.

Rugby was incorporated as sport into the St. George's College of Quilmes, Buenos Aires, in 1921. Two years later, the first match between the St. George's students and former alumni (self-named "Old Georgian") was played.

The team was affiliated with the Argentine Rugby Union in 1935, and due to its high performances Old Georgian was invited to play in first division in 1936. The first match at the top level was played on May 11, 1936 against Pacific Club (today San Martín) winning 11-5.

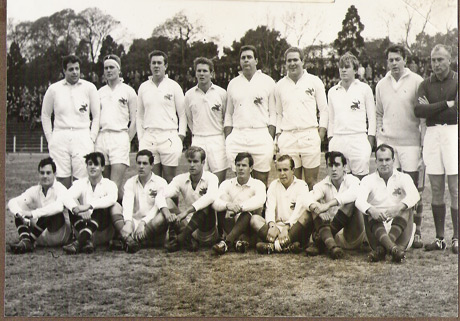
Old Georgian rugby union team in 1965.

The Rugby team was especially successful during the 1930s, winning three Torneo de la URBA consecutive championships between 1937 (remaining unbeaten) and 1939, which would be the club's only titles. Argentine newspaper La Prensa published about those achievements: "With this victory, Old Georgian has established as the best rugby academy of our country"

When the World War II began, many players departed from the club to fight for Great Britain. From 1936 to 1954 many Old Georgian players were called to play for the national team.

By the 1970s it became increasingly difficult to find enough players to field competitive teams, although the club was able to tour Kenya in 1973, playing against several teams including Scorpions RFC. By 1978 the practice of rugby had been abandoned and the club disaffiliated from the Union in 1979.

Efforts were made in 1995 to resume playing but this revival was short-lived and ended in 1997. Since 2011 the club has rebuilt its rugby team, initially with alumni from St George's College. In 2012 the Dragón came back to competition when an Old Georgian team was registered again in the URBA. The senior squad was promoted to the second division after beating Club San Miguel.

In 2015, OG had two teams competing in URBA junior tournaments. By 2016, the number had increased to four, a First Division team, an "Intermedia" division team, and M17 and M15 teams.

== Honours ==
=== Rugby union ===
- Torneo de la Unión Argentina (3): 1937, 1938, 1939

== See also ==
- St. George's College, Quilmes
