= Dewi Bebb =

British Lions & Wales international rugby union player

- Born: Dewi Iorwerth Ellis Bebb; 7 August 1938 Bangor, Wales
- Died: 14 March 1996 (aged 57) Pontypridd, Wales
- Height: 1.76 m (5 ft 9 in)
- Weight: 72 kg (11 st 5 lb)
- School: Friars School, Bangor
- University: Trinity College, Carmarthen
- Occupation(s): Teacher; Broadcaster

Rugby union career
- Position: wing
Amateur team(s)
Years	Team	Apps	(Points)
- Bangor RFC
–	Colwyn Bay RFC		
–	United Services Portsmouth RFC		
–	Royal Navy Rugby Union		
–	Swansea RFC		
–	Barbarian F.C.		
International career
Years	Team	Apps	(Points)
1959–1967	Wales	34	(33)
1962–1966	British Lions	8	(3)

Dewi Iorwerth Ellis Bebb (7 August 1938 – 14 March 1996) was a Welsh rugby union player who won thirty-four caps for Wales as a wing. He later worked in television.

He made his debut for Swansea in a game against Llanelli in 1958. He remained with Swansea throughout his playing career, making 221 appearances, scoring 87 tries and captaining the team in the 1963–4 and 1964–5 seasons.

== Early life ==
Dewi Bebb was the son of the Welsh historian Ambrose Bebb. After attending Friars School, Bangor he was conscripted into the Royal Navy. After the navy he studied at Trinity College, Carmarthen, and Cardiff Teacher Training College.

== Rugby career ==
He made his first appearance for Wales against England in 1959, eventually winning thirty four caps between 1959 and 1967 and scoring eleven tries. He was selected for Wales' first overseas tour in 1964 and played in the Welsh rugby team's first match outside of Europe and its first in the Southern Hemisphere; played against East Africa in Nairobi on 12 May 1964, Wales winning 8–26. He toured with the British and Irish Lions to South Africa in 1962, playing in two of the four tests, and to Australia, New Zealand and Canada in 1966, playing in all six tests. He was joint top try scorer on the 1966 tour.

== Television ==
Bebb was originally a teacher by profession. In 1964 he joined the television company TWW, where he presented the Welsh-language news programme y Dydd. He worked for the successor television franchise HTV, and moved to sports commentary and production work. He edited HTV's Sports Arena programme and was involved in covering the 1987 and 1991 Rugby World Cups and two Olympic Games.

His son Sion is a professional golfer who has played on the European Tour.

== Notes ==
Rugby Union Captain
Preceded by John Faull	Swansea RFC Captain; 1963–1965	Succeeded by Morrie Evans
