= Haydn Davies (rugby union) =

Welsh rugby union player

Hayden Davies
- Full name: Hayden John Davies
- Born: 21 November 1935 Cowbridge, Wales
- Died: 22 December 2017 (aged 82) Hertfordshire, England
- School: Cowbridge Grammar School
- University: University of Cambridge
- Occupation: Chartered accountant

Rugby union career
- Position: Centre
International career
Years	Team	Apps	(Points)
1959	Wales	2	(0)

Hayden John Davies (21 November 1935 — 22 December 2017) was a Welsh international rugby union player.

== Early life ==
Raised in Cowbridge, Davies attended Cowbridge Grammar School, where his abilities in cricket and rugby union earned him Welsh Schools representative honours for both sports. He read law and economics at the University of Cambridge.

== Rugby career ==
Davies played for Aberavon and was a centre partner to Geoff Windsor-Lewis in the Cambridge University XV, winning a blue in the 1958 Varsity match. He was capped twice by Wales in 1959, against England at Arms Park and Scotland at Murrayfield. After graduating from Cambridge, Davies was based in London and competed with the London Welsh club. He won an international recall for the 1964 Wales rugby union tour of Africa, but didn't add to his caps.

== Personal life ==
A chartered accountant, Davies worked for Clive Lewis and Co, surveyors.

== See also ==
- List of Wales national rugby union players
