= Public School Wanderers =

Sports club in the United Kingdom

(England) Public School Wanderers
- Full name: Public School Wanderers Rugby and Cricket Club
- Union: Rugby Football Union
- Nickname(s): PSW, Wanderers
- Founded: 1940

Official website
- www.wix.com/lwrfc1/publicschoolwanderers/

The Public School Wanderers Club is a sports club in the United Kingdom that was formed in 1940 by Charles Burton, a Fleet Street journalist. It was formed to provide cricket and rugby for public schoolboys during their school holidays, but with difficulties arising from World War II the Club started to provide games for servicemen as well. During the period of hostilities the Club provided over a thousand games of cricket and rugby for servicemen from all parts of the British Commonwealth.

== Founding principles ==
=== Ethos ===
After the war the Club became open, though still by invitation only; a player is invited to become a Wanderer because they are a credit to their sport (be it cricket or rugby) and will enter into the spirit of maintaining the high standards of play and conduct achieved by generations of preceding club members.

=== Colours, crest and motto ===
The club colours are red (representing the morning sky), green (for the playing field) and pink (of the setting sun).

The club crest contains five charges, a book (representing scholarship and the schools from which the original players were drawn), the lion of Cambridge University RFC, the crown of Oxford University RFC, the Rod of Asclepius representing the United Hospitals RFC and an escallop which has connotations of pilgrimage in heraldry. There is also a Bishop's Mitre for the church affiliated public schools.

The club motto is In concordia floreamus which is Latin for In friendship we flourish.

== Rugby ==
=== History ===
The rugby team play regional fixtures, celebration games, provide teams to play in developing rugby countries and engage in other rugby missionary activities. They play the 15-a-side version of the game though it is in 7-a-side rugby tournaments that the Wanderers have made their reputation. Since its inception, over 2000 players have represented the Wanderers in over 5,000 matches.

The Wanderers have played "international" fixtures against Belgium, Germany, Netherlands, Italy, Kenya and New Zealand, they have also toured Bermuda, Canada, East Africa, South Africa, Uruguay, United States, Sri Lanka in 2005 on a 4-match tour and most European countries. They even took over the British Lions' cancelled fixtures in Zimbabwe in 1982. They have been finalists on two occasions at the Middlesex Sevens, represented England at the Monte Carlo Sevens in 1987, 1988 and winning in 1989. They were finalists at the 1988 Hong Kong Sevens and won the London Sevens as well as the 1996 Safari Sevens in Nairobi, Kenya.

A notable event in the history of the Wanderers occurred in the 1988 – 89 season when it fielded a team comprising 15 internationals against a Bath XV consisting of a full complement of Internationals also. Bath was the first non-invitation club to have been able to field a fully international side since Newport RFC did so in 1902.

The modern era has required the Wanderers to refocus their fixture list to reflect the realities of modern professional rugby, taking into account the contractual obligations that players now have with their clubs. Clubs still benefit from the more relaxed games that the Wanderers offer and use them to test players returning from injury or to allow younger players to demonstrate their talents.

Nomadic by tradition, the club continues to play representative matches and to tour developing rugby countries, true to their roots – a combination of youth and experience. Though the club has evolved to match the developments in the sport, it still measures its success not by victories but by its established tradition of playing entertaining rugby. Any club wishing to invite the Wanderers to participate in a commemorative game or tournament either at home or abroad should contact the club through its website.

=== Matches, tours and tournament results ===
==== Seven-a-side tournaments ====
- Aberayron Sevens - Winners
- Amsterdam Sevens - Winners
- Bridgend Sevens - Winners
- Cheltenham Sevens - Winners
- Cwmtawe Sevens - Winners
- Glengarth Sevens - Winners (4 times)
- Hawick Centenary Sevens - Winners
- Harrogate Sevens - Winners
- Headingly Sevens - Winners
- Hong Kong Sevens - Finalists, 1985
- Kelso Sevens - Winners 1985, Runners up 1986
- London Sevens - Winners
- London Welsh Centenary Sevens - Winners
- Lords Taverners Sevens - Winners
- Melrose Sevens in 1975
- Middlesex Sevens - Finalists (twice), once on 27 April 1963
- Midland Sevens at Coventry – Winners 2001, beating Ebbw Vale RFC 16-6
- Monte Carlo Sevens - Winners
- Murrayfield Sevens - Winners
- Northern Sevens - Winners
- Oxford Sevens - Winners
- Punta Del Este Sevens tournament in Uruguay 1994 - Semi Finalists
- Safari Sevens - Winners (twice), Colin Charvis Captained the side and they won the tournament in 1996, won Plate 1997, won tournament 1999
- Scarborough Festival - Winners
- Selkirk Sevens - Winners 1972

Streatham sevens 1969 - Winners

==== Fifteen-a-side matches and tours ====
Date	Notes
1971	Team toured Italy
28 February 1973	played against Belgrano Athletic Club from Buenos Aires, Argentina at Kingsholm
1973	Match v Newton Abbot RFC
1973	Match v Brussels Barbarians RFC
May 1974	Reports of a tour to Rhodesia, contrary to the spirit of sanctions imposed by the United Nations Security Council upon that country at that time.
27 March 1974	Match v Gloucester RFC won 21 – 35 Peter Butler scored 3 penalty goals for Gloucester
October 1976	Toured the United States, lost to Miami RFC 10-16
1980	Toured Zimbabwe
13 December 1987	played South Korea at Old Deer Park
Tuesday 2 January 1990	Played v Bridgend RFC at the Brewery Field
2005	Tour to Sri Lanka, played against Western Province Rugby Union on June 14 at CR & FC Grounds, Longdon Place – Colombo 7 (winning 58 points (four goals, four tries, 1 penalty try and 1 penalty) to 13 (1 goal, 2 penalties)), June 16 against Sri Lanka RFU President's XV at Maitland Crescent (see), June 19 versus Central Province Invitation XV at Nittawela (either Nittawela Stadium, Kandy or Nittawela village, original documents do not make clear) and June 22 against the Combined Defence Services Rugby team at Army Grounds, Galle Face.
