= Len Cunningham =

- Full name: Leonard John Cunningham
- Born: 3 January 1931 Port Talbot, Wales
- Died: 20 July 1998 (aged 67) Bridgend, Wales
- Occupation: Steelworker / Licensee

Rugby union career
- Position: Prop
International career
Years	Team	Apps	(Points)
1960–64	Wales	14	(0)

Leonard John Cunningham (3 January 1931 — 20 July 1998) was a Welsh international rugby union player.

Born in Port Talbot, Cunningham was a prop and played for Cheltenham while based at RAF Innsworth during the 1950s, but spent most of his career with Aberavon. He played 12 seasons for Aberavon, including two as captain.

Cunningham competed for Wales from 1960 to 1964, gaining 14 caps. He featured in three Five Nations campaigns and made his last appearance during the 1964 tour of South Africa in a one-off Test against the Springboks in Durban.

== See also ==
- List of Wales national rugby union players
