= Grahame Hodgson =

Wales international rugby union footballer

- Born: Grahame Thornton Ridgeway Hodgson; 1 December 1936 Ogmore Vale, Wales
- Died: 23 January 2016 (aged 79)
- Height: 178 cm (5 ft 10 in)
- Weight: 78 kg (12 st 4 lb)
- School: Ogmore Vale Grammar
- University: St Luke's College, Exeter
- Occupation: schoolmaster

Rugby union career
- Position: Fullback
Amateur team(s)
Years	Team	Apps	(Points)
- Ogmore Vale RFC
–	Bridgend RFC		
–	Exeter Saracens RFC		
–	Exeter RFC		
–	Torquay RFC		
–	Teignmouth RFC		
–	Aberavon RFC		
–	Llanelli RFC		
–	Neath RFC		
–	Glamorgan		
–	Devon		
–	Barbarian F.C.		
International career
Years	Team	Apps	(Points)
1962–1967	Wales	15	(12)

Grahame Thornton Ridgeway Hodgson (1 December 1936 – 23 January 2016) was a Welsh international rugby union player.

Hodgson was born in Ogmore Vale, and played club rugby for Ogmore Vale RFC, Aberavon RFC, Bridgend RFC, Exeter RFC, Exeter Saracens RFC, Teignmouth RFC, Torquay RFC and Neath RFC. He played 15 tests for Wales between 1962 and 1967. His position was full back. He died on 23 January 2016 after a short illness, aged 79.
