= David John Hayward =

David Hayward
- Born: David John Hayward; 1 March 1934 Crumlin, Wales
- Died: 12 November 2003 (aged 69)
- School: Newbridge Grammar School
- University: Loughborough University
- Occupation: interior designer

Rugby union career
- Position: Flanker
Senior career
Years	Team	Apps	(Points)
- Loughborough Colleges
–	Crumlin		
–	Newbridge		
–	Cardiff		
–	Leicestershire		
International career
Years	Team	Apps	(Points)
1963-1964	Wales	6	(3)

David John Hayward (1 March 1934 – 12 November 2003) was a Wales international rugby union player. Hayward played club rugby for Crumlin, Newbridge and first-class team Cardiff. He was chairman of Cardiff RFC from 1985 to 1986.
