= Mean Machine RFC =

Kenyan rugby union club, based in Nairobi

(Kenya) Mean Machine
- Nickname: Machine (Eschuma).
- Founded: 1977; 49 years ago
- Location: Nairobi, Kenya
- Ground(s): University of Nairobi Grounds, 2,000 capacity
- Chairman: Paul Ekirapa
- Coach(es): Elli Mukaizi, Nick Abok
- Captain(s): Emmanuel Carlton, Victor Mwangi, Zack Ondijo, Kevin Daniel Ouma, Marvin Karungii, Festus Safari, Shaddon Munoko, Isaac Waweru, Rene Inyanga, Wayne Orwa, Stanley Lunani, George Mutuku, Cedric Odera,
- League(s): Kenya Cup, Eric Shirley Shield, Enterprise Cup, Chairman's Cup, Championship
Team kit

Mean Machine RFC is a Rugby union club based in Nairobi, Kenya. It is the representative side of the University of Nairobi and was founded in 1977 during the time when rugby union in Kenya was predominantly played by white settlers and expats. The club features the best students in Kenya who join the university and they come from various University campuses i.e. Main Campus, Chiromo Campus, Parklands Campus, Lower Kabete Campus, Upper Kabete Campus, Kenya Science Campus as well as Mombasa Campus. In their inaugural year, they won the Kenya Cup. Mean Machine has also won the KRU championship twice, in 2018 and 2022 and also won the inaugural Varsity Cup League. During the 1980s the club was forced to close due to political pressure after the 1982 coup d'état attempt, and many players would have to play for other clubs.

== See also ==
- Rugby union in Kenya
