= Rugby Football Union of East Africa =

Umbrella group of East African football organizations

R.F.U.E.A.
- Sport: Rugby union
- Founded: 1953
- CAR affiliation: 1986 (founder member)
- President: George Kariuki

The Rugby Football Union of East Africa (RFUEA) is an umbrella union for the Kenya Rugby Football Union, Tanzania Rugby Football Union and Uganda Rugby Football Union. It owes its existence to the fact that, prior to independence, Kenya, Tanzania (previously Tanganyika) and Uganda were either a protectorate or mandate of the British Empire. It now has little to do with the direct administration of the modern game but it continues to exist in order (in conjunction with the Rugby Patrons Society) to promote and support the game in the three countries, to facilitate club competition between the three unions and to administer the RFUEA Ground and the East Africa rugby union team.

At a recent meeting, the International Rugby Board (IRB) president, Bernard Lepasset has expressed support for taking the RFUEA out of mothballs so that it can be charged with running events like the Victoria Cup and the East African Super Series.

== Rugby in East Africa before the RFUEA ==
To fully understand the history of rugby in the three East African nations of Kenya, Uganda and Tanzania, it must first be understood that at the time the sport was introduced to the region these three countries were part of the British Empire. East Africa had been divided between the British and German colonial empires until the end of the First World War when the vast majority of German influence was handed to the British. Kenya, Uganda and Zanzibar had been under British influence since the late 19th and early 20th centuries, whilst Tanganyika was transferred to British control in 1919.

The Colony and Protectorate of Kenya, Tanganyika Territory the Protectorate of Uganda and the Protectorate of Zanzibar were regarded by the Empire as territories or provinces in much the same was as the colonies of the Cape, Natal, Transvaal and the Orange River Colony.

=== Club and inter territorial rugby ===
The first union in British East Africa was the Rugby Football Union of Kenya (RFU-K), founded in August 1921 (although it did not become effective until 1923 with the formation of the first two Nairobi clubs - Nondescripts RFC and Harlequins R.F.C.); it was responsible for the administration of the game throughout Kenya, Uganda and Tanganyika which it carried out through various district sub-unions throughout the region.

=== Incoming tours ===
Several universities and Royal Navy ships sent teams to tour East Africa prior to the Second World War. The first was H.M.S. Southampton (1922), closely followed by H.M.S. Colombo (1923) and then (frequently more than once over the next decade) His Majesty's Ships Cairo, Chatham, Effingham and Enterprise. This latter vessel was to provide a lasting memento of its visits by presenting the Enterprise Cup to the union in 1928; a trophy that has been the object of competition between clubs in the region ever since. The Combined South African Universities toured in 1929 and in 1935 Danie Craven captained Stellenbosch University on a tour of the region; though none of these encounters included a match against a representative East Africa team. The first representative team called East Africa, are recorded facing Cape Town University in 1949.

== The formation of the RFUEA ==
In 1953 the Rugby Football Union of East Africa (RFUEA) was created in order to take over the mantle as the umbrella organisation for rugby in the region. The creation of the RFUEA allowed for the formation of the Tanganyika Rugby Football Union (T.R.F.U.) in 1954 and Uganda Rugby Football Union (U.R.F.U.) in 1955. Each of these were essentially a sub-union of the RFUEA much as the district unions in Kenya were, so the RFU-K was dissolved in 1956 allowing the already existing district unions to deal directly with the RFUEA.
