= List of schools in Kenya =

This is a list of notable schools in Kenya.

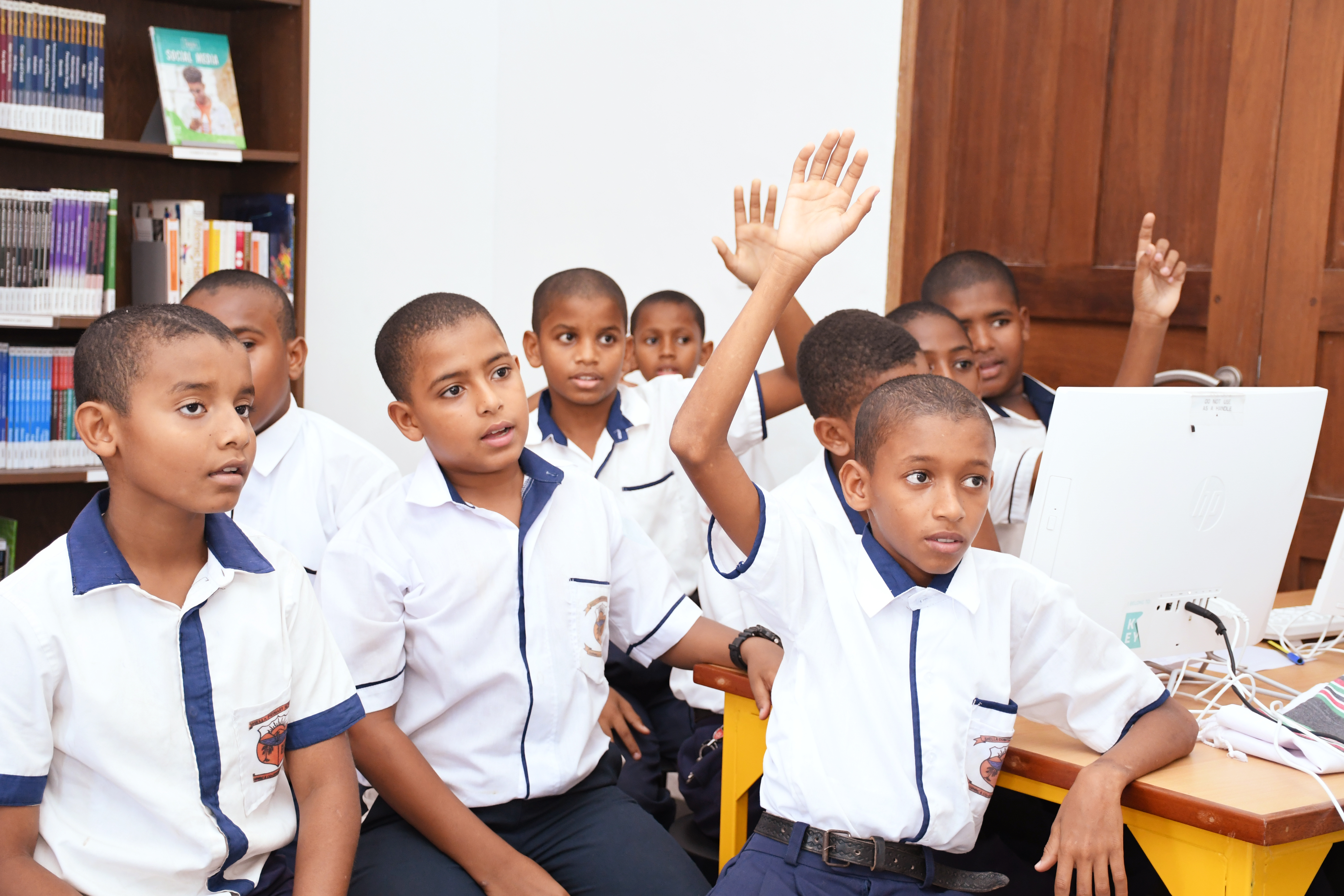
Male Kenyan students at Shela Primary School - Lamu county.

== Primary schools ==
Primary schools in Kenya may be designated as follows:

- DEB, indicating that they were founded by the now abolished District Education Boards, hence were public schools from the start.
- RC, indicating that they were founded and sponsored by the Roman Catholic Church as it was known then
- AC, indicating that they were founded and sponsored initially by the Anglican Church
- Others may have no designation, meaning they were founded well after independence or they have dropped their sponsor designation from their official name.

=== Kiambu ===
- The Green Garden Schools
- Kiambu High School

=== Embu ===
- Kangaru High School

=== Mombasa ===
- Mombasa Academy
- Oshwal Academy
- Aga Khan Academy

=== Murang'a ===
- Murang'a High School

=== Nairobi County ===
- The Green Garden Schools, Rongai
- Humble Hearts School
- Kenya Muslim Academy
- Malezi School
- Rosslyn Academy, Nairobi
- Serare School
- Strathmore School, Lavington

=== Nakuru ===
- Mountain Park Academy

== Secondary and high schools ==
Qualifications required
| School | City or Town | County | Former Province |
|---|---|---|---|
| St. Ruth School - Boys Boarding Gilgil | Gilgil | Nakuru County | Nakuru |
| Kionjoine Secondary School (St Vincent) | Murang'a | Murang'a | Central |
| St. Mary's Kibabii Boys High School | Kibabii | Bungoma County | Western |
| Aga Khan Academy, Mombasa | Mombasa | Mombasa County | Coast |
| Aga Khan Academy, Nairobi | Parklands | Nairobi County | Nairobi Province |
| St. Joseph's Nyalula Mixed Secondary School | Siaya | Siaya County | Nyanza |
| St. Paul Obambo Mixed Secondary School | Siaya | Siaya County | Nyanza |
| Boro Secondary School | Siaya | Siaya County | Nyanza |
| Bar Olengo Secondary School | Siaya | Siaya County | Nyanza |
| Barding Boys High School | Siaya | Siaya County | Nyanza |
| Maranda Boys High School. | Siaya | Siaya County | Nyanza |
| Hawinga Girls secondary school | Siaya | Siaya County | Nyanza |
| Ngíya Girls High School | Siaya | Siaya County | Nyanza Province |
| Agoro Sare High School (Est. 1958) | Oyugis | Homa Bay County | Nyanza Province |
| Alliance High School (established 1926) | Kikuyu | Kiambu County | Central |
| Bishop Gatimu Ngandu Girls High School | Nyeri | Nyeri County | Central Province |
| Bukhakunga Secondary School | Kakamega | Kakamega County | Western |
| Chania High School (split in 2000 into Chania Boys High School and Chania Girls High School) | Thika | Kiambu County | Central Province |
| City High School, Nairobi (established 1952; closed 1995) | Nairobi | Nairobi County | Nairobi Province |
| Dago Thim Mixed Secondary School | Nyahera, Kisumu Town West | Kisumu County | Nyanza Province |
| Dagoretti High School | Nairobi | Nairobi County | Nairobi Province |
| Daraja Academy | Nanyuki | Laikipia County | Rift Valley |
| The Highway Secondary School | South B | Nairobi County | Nairobi Province |
| Jomo Kenyatta High School | Kakamega | Nakuru County | Rift Valley Province |
| Kabaa High School | Machakos | Machakos County | Eastern |
| Kangaru High School | Kangaru | Embu County | Eastern Province |
| Kagumo High School | Kagumo | Nyeri County | Central Province |
| Kakamega School | Kakamega | Kakamega County | Western Province |
| Kalulini Boys High School | Kibwezi | Makueni County | Eastern Province |
| Kapsabet High School (Established 1925) | Nandi North | Nandi County | Rift Valley Province |
| Kenya High School | Nairobi | Nairobi County | Nairobi Province |
| Kianda School (established 1977) | Nairobi | Nairobi County | Nairobi Province |
| Kiereni Secondary School | Chuka | Tharaka Nithi County | |
| Kisii School | Kisii, Kenya | Kisii County | Nyanza |
| Kitengela Mixed Secondary School | Milimani | | |
| Lenana School | Nairobi | Nairobi County | Nairobi Province |
| Mang'u High School (established 1925) | Thika | Kiambu County | Central Province |
| Maraba Secondary School | | Nandi County | Rift Valley Province |
| Maranda High School | Bondo | Siaya County | Nyanza Province |
| Maseno School (established 1906) | Maseno | Kisumu County | Nyanza Province |
| Light Academy Secondary School Mombasa | Nyali | Mombasa County | Coast |
| Mosocho Academy | Kisii, Kenya | Kisii County | Nyanza Province |
| Mumbuni High School | Machakos | Machakos County | Eastern Province |
| Nairobi School (established 1929) | Nairobi | Nairobi County | Nairobi Province |
| Nakuru Boys High School | Nakuru | Nakuru County | Rift Valley Province |
| Namachanja High School | | Bungoma County | Western |
| Ngara Girls' High School | Nairobi | Nairobi County | Nairobi Province |
| Ng'iya Girls High School | Ngiya | Siaya County | Nyanza Province |
| Nyakach Girls High School | Sondu | Kisumu County | Nyanza |
| Nyandarua High School | Ol Kalou | Nyandarua County | Central Province |
| Nyang'ori High School | Vihiga | Vihiga County | Western Province |
| Nyeri High School | Nyeri | Nyeri County | Central Province |
| Ondati Girls Secondary School | Ondati | | Nyanza Province |
| Oriwo Boy's High School | Kandiege, Karachuonyo Constituency | Homa Bay County | Nyanza Province |
| Oshwal High School | Nairobi | Nairobi County | Nairobi Province |
| Our Lady of Lourdes Nyabururu Girls National School | Central Kisii | Kisii County | Nyanza |
| PCEA Silanga High School | Kibera | Nairobi County | Nairobi Province |
| St. Joseph's Rapogi Secondary School | Migori | Migori County | Nyanza Province |
| Sawagongo High School | | Siaya County | Nyanza Province |
| SDA Schools | Watamu | Kilifi County | Coast Province |
| Senior Chief Koinange High School | Kiambaa | Kiambu County | Central Province |
| St. Stephen's Menara Boys High School | Muhoroni | Kisumu County | Nyanza |
| Kijabe Boys High School | Lari | Kiambu County | Central Province |
| Serare School | Nairobi | Nairobi County | Nairobi Province |
| Strathmore School | Lavington | Nairobi County | |
| Utumishi academy | Nakuru, gilgil | Nakuru county | |
| Litein High School | Litein | Kericho County | |
| Kipsigis Girls High School | Kericho | Kericho County | |
| cardinal otunga girls national school kanduyi,Bungoma Bungoma county | | | |

== International schools in Kenya ==
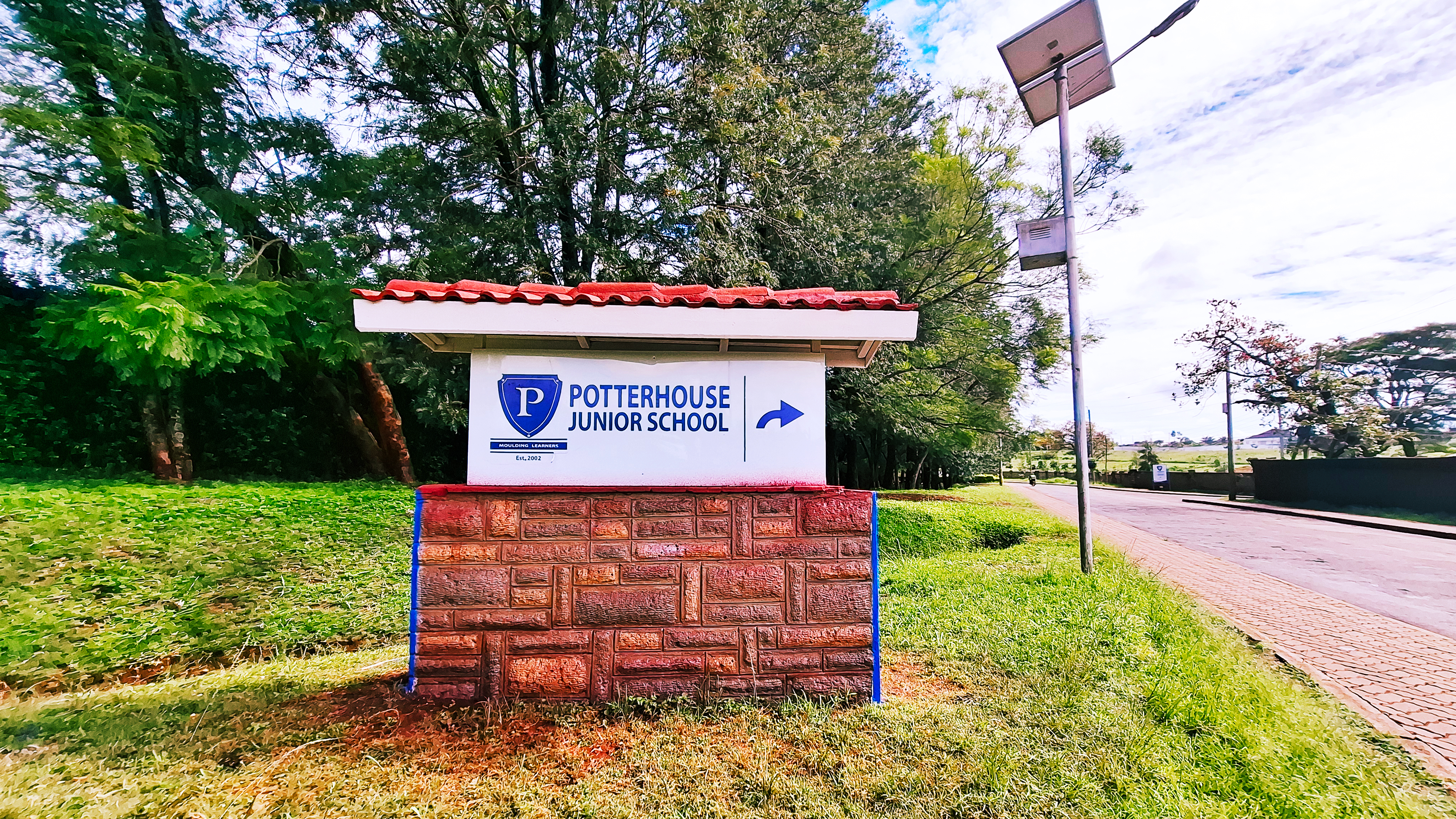
Potterhouse School-Runda

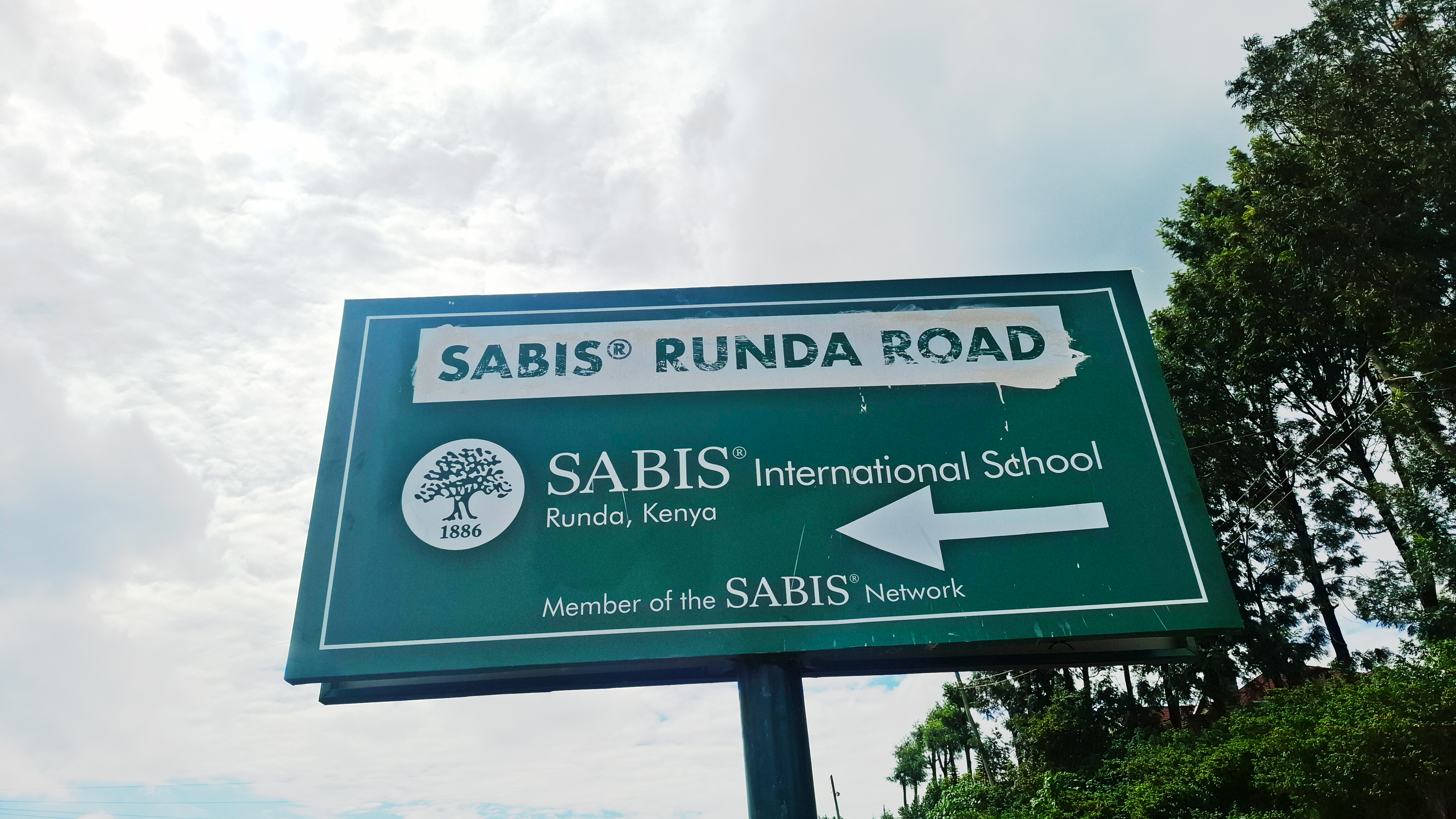
Sabis International School-Runda

- Brookhouse School, Nairobi
- German School Nairobi
- Greensteds School, Nakuru
- Hillcrest School, Nairobi
- International School of Kenya, Nairobi
- Millennium Global International School, Nairobi
- Nairobi Academy
- Nairobi Japanese School
- Rift Valley Academy, Kijabe
- Rosslyn Academy, Nairobi
- St. Andrews School, Turi, near Nakuru
- Smartious Homeschool and eSchool, Nairobi
