= Kisumu RFC =

Kenyan rugby union football team

(Kenya) Kisumu RFC
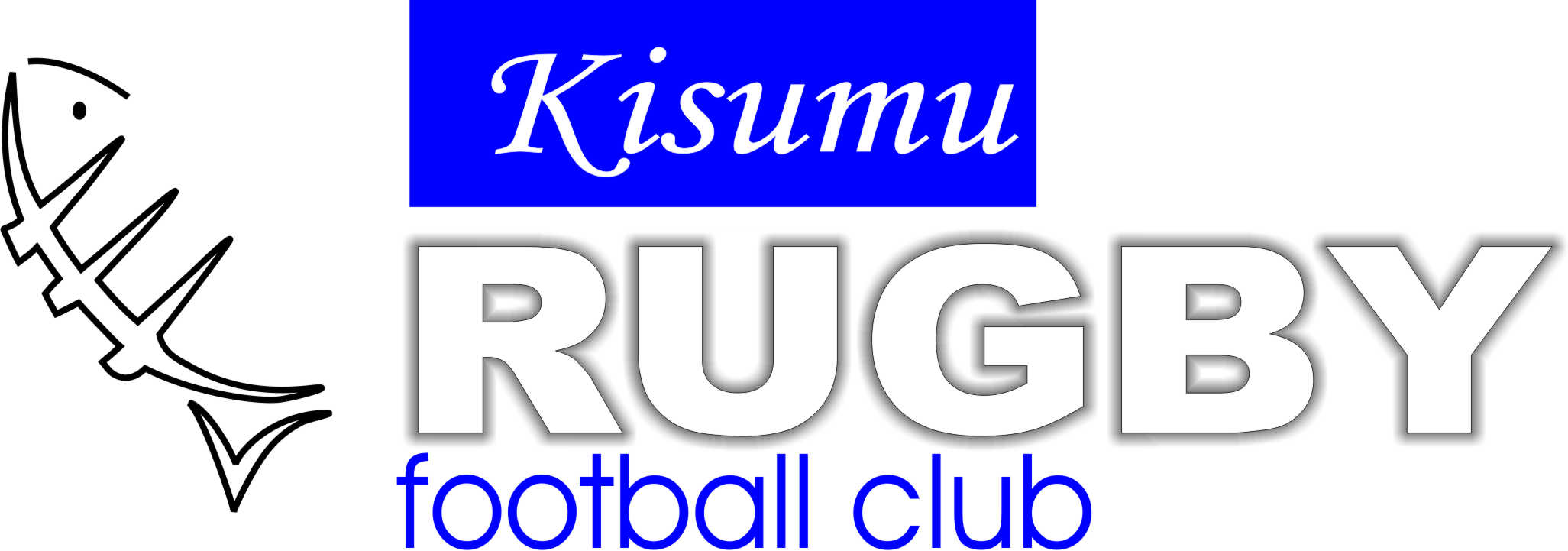
- Full name: Kisumu Rugby Football Club
- Union: Kenya Rugby Football Union
- Nickname: Dala / Lakeside RFC
- Founded: 1982; 44 years ago
- Location: Kisumu, Kenya
- Region: Nyanza Province
- Ground(s): Kisumu Polytechnic – Makasembo, Grounds
- League: Nationwide League

Kisumu Rugby Football Club is a Kenyan rugby union club based in Kisumu. Also known as Lakeside RFC, for the 2015–16 season the club competes in the Nationwide League.

== History and origins ==
=== Kisumu Rugby Football Club, Kisumu ===
Kisumu was founded in 1982, by David Mshila, Dennis Awori, Job Owino, Jack Ogal, Jim Owino, and Jos Odaga. They were originally based at the Kisumu Railway Club and the Jomo Kenyatta Sports Ground in Kisumu. Kisumu Boys High School also served as a training venue for years. Kisumu Technical High School (later called Kisumu Polytechnic – Makasembo) (1997) was used as a venue for games because of the good grass facility. In 1983 Kisumu combined with Kakamega, Kitale and Eldoret to form KITUSUMU: an acronym for Kitale and Kisumu.J.B Nyamwange, Jack and Walter Omaido came in from Kitale. Reg 'Pape" Sembi of Kakamega, a Canadian member of the Peace Corps Johnson Travis and Paul Scott of Eldoret. Records indicate that Barclays bank RFC travelled to Kakamega in 1985 playing Kisumu in the Enterprise Cup match. Barclays won the game 47–4. Kisumu and Kitusumu played mainly as a Western Kenya touring side but folded up in 1988.

It is host to the Dala Sevens tournaments in the Kenya Rugby Football Union Calendar, one part of the Kenya National Sevens Circuit, today Safaricom Sevens series.

== Notable players and officials ==
- Fred Jura
- Andrew Amonde
- Dennis Awori
- Jimmy Ayoki
- Paul Okong'o
- Elvin Okong'o
- Peter Okong'o
- Nasser Midamba
- Andrew Okwaro
- David Akelola
- Susan Nyaribo
- Tolbert Achayo
- Newman Opiyo
- Issa Mohamed Issa
- Silas Namale Amunga
- Bella Maguys
- Teddy Omondi San
- Clifford Mabeya Mayaka
- Brian Waswala Olewe
- Charles Okuthe
- Lutta Kasamani
- Paul Okullu
- Felix Okech
- Richard Nyakwaka
- Joseph Musiga
- Karyna Okwaro
- Gordon Raila
- Gwada Ogot
- Benjamin Opondo
- David Mshila
- Job Owino
- Jack Ogal
- Jimmy Owino
- Fidel Odinga
- Felix Owili
- Ted Edward Ahono
- Antony Okeyo
- Richard Sidindi Jaadha
- Martin Owilla
- Amos Amos
- Bruce Ger
- Amos Odhiambo
- Shem Odhiambo

== Revival ==
Kisumu RFC was revived in late 1990 by rugby enthusiasts led by Mike Omondi, Bella Maguys, Gordon Raila, Peter Openda, Jim Owino, Dennis Otti, Joseph Owino, Eric Ogot, Sammy Ogot, Susan Nyaribo, Bob Bengo, Paul Okong’o, Nasser Midamba, Trevor Mugwanga, John Mark Magana, Oyunga Pala, Felix Okech and Issa Mohamed Issa amongst others. After the initial positive response to training, Jimmy Owino was appointed club coach. His initial task was to build a team with more commitment and solidarity, and to weed out the complacent 'feel good attitude' that had led to the dissipation of the original Kisumu RFC.

Jimmy's approach bore rapid results, but the next major obstacle became finance. At a team, Kamukunji it was unanimously agreed that Charles Lutta Kasamani be appointed Club patron, should he agree. He agreed. He donated playing kit, rugby balls and a first aid box. Some of the Kisumu-based personalities who raised funds tirelessly at the infamous Club Night at the Kisumu Hotel(Hotel Royale) pool side included Nilmar Darbar, Widar Krogsund, Ogweno Omwaga, Franz Bonn, Noel Okoth, Mike Humphreys, Morris Odhiambo, Jacko Omino, Peter Odaga, Paul Okullu, Peter Openda, Jos Odaga Charles Okuthe and many more whose names we cannot include here. An interim office of Charles Okuthe (chairman) and Bella Maguys (Secretary) organized the first ever rugby tournament in Kisumu which was 'not too good not too bad 'in October 1991. The same office later organized Kisumu RFC elections which saw a new office of Peter Openda (chairman) and Paul Okullu (Hon- Secretary) take over, with most of the interim office bearers not seeking re-election.

From 1991 to 1996, Kisumu steadily concentrated on building a strong foundation by taking part in tournaments such as the Great Rift Valley 10-aside in Nakuru and Mombasa's Driftwood Sevens. This was by choice because of a small player base and financial limitations. At the same time, the Club hosted the Kisumu Ten-aside event held between 1991 and 1994. With a rich hinterland of players from Maseno School, St. Mary's School Yala, Nyang'ori High School, Moi University and Maseno University there was light at the end of the tunnel. Mombasa businessman Edwin Yinda donated playing kit to the team after the Driftwood finals contested between Mean Machine RFC and Kisumu.

== Kabeberi 7s 1997 ==
Kisumu RFC first came to the fore when they reached the Driftwood 7s in Mombasa in 1994 losing in sudden death to Mean Machine RFC. Come 1997, Kisumu again reached the Finals of the Driftwood 7s in 1997 losing to the United States International University Africa.

It is a Sunday in June 1997 and the George Mwangi Kabeberi Memorial 7s is on at the Nairobi Railway Club. Kenya is playing, using the one-day event as preparation for the Tusker Safari 7s in a couple of week's time. The squad is composed of Sammy Khakame, Paul Murunga, Tolbert Onyango, Ken Thimba, Gordon Anampiu, Felix 'Toti' Ochieng', Manuel Okoth, Steve Gichuki & Co. Kisumu RFC are also present and the players on show are Andrew Okwaro, Fred Jura, Frank Ndong' Steve Oloo, Issa Matan Issa, Moses Kola, Tony Lamba, Job Odonde and Dan Alego, Gordon Raila, Felix Oketch, Bob Bengo. Two weeks before at the driftwood sevens in Mombasa the lakeside outfit finished runners -up losing 19–7 to USIU-Africa.

Kisumu had moved away from mere participation to competition and the rugby fraternity had taken notice. Expectations from both the playing unit and fanatics were high. Mean Machine RFC arrived and in the side was Eric 'Shaggy' Mwangi, Biko Ambesta, Ted Okinda, Ken Aswani, Kanyi Gitonga, Eric Musuva, Oyunga Pala, Kevin Matabutu, Sundiya Halwenge and Paul Okong'o. And the event kicked off and the usual winners and losers and it looked like a kawa event, till Kenya met Kisumu and there was fireworks. Kenya despite her constellation of international players with exposure in Selkirkshire, Dubai, Spain and Singapore struggled to beat Kisumu, but that was just round one. To the semis of the Main Cup and Kisumu again met Kenya while Mean Machine RFC played Nakuru RFC. Nakuru with Ben 'Benways' Otieno, Caleb Langat and the hard hitting and sometimes illegal play were too strong for Machine and that was the end for Machine.

Kisumu and Kenya faced off in the second semi-final; it was a fiercely contested battle. Spectators at the Railway Club were vocal in their support for Kisumu. Having played for the ‘Ninjas’ for a long time, Tony Lamba seemed to have found a new lease on life—he was in excellent form in his new team’s jersey.He kept creating one opportunity after another for Jura, Okwaro, Kola, and their teammates. However, Kenya quickly regrouped, took control of the match, and secured a spot in the final, where they were set to face the Rift Valley side, Nakuru.

It was not a good day for Kenya; Nakuru’s new winger, Caleb Langat, completely outplayed the Kenyan wingers by scoring a series of ‘tries.’ In the end, Nakuru RFC emerged victorious. By the following Monday, Andrew Okwaro and Fred Jura received call-ups to play for the Kenyan national team.

== Tour to Uganda ==
A tour to Uganda in October saw them leave a mark with their trademark after hard running, tackling and skill levels in a country which just began to pick the game after 20 years. The visitor's led 13–7 at halftime before the hosts recovered to win 47–13 in the second-half. This was a 'test' versus Uganda. 1997 marked the turning point for Kisumu Rugby. They did not look back and Kisumu became a fertile rugby nursery nurturing young players just out of school into mature club and national team material.

== Eric Shirley Shield ==
Kisumu joined the Second division ESS in 1998 after winning the Bowl league in 1997. The ESS would prove tricky for Kisumu. The challenge came from two quarters, one depth in terms of players and two finances to honor 11 away games with most teams based in Nairobi. The league would be honored on and off between 1998 and 2002.

Away from that the management board of Kisumu actively engaged the Union in trying to secure a future. In behind the scenes talks the Kisumu management Board asked the Union for one leg of the National Sevens Circuit. At talks in Moshi, Tanzania in December 2002 a hush-hush deal was done with the Hon-Secretary of the Union Richard Omwela who was scheduled to contest for the Chairmanship in a number of months.

With Mount Kilimanjaro providing a spectacular backdrop, to the conversation he proposed a deal. In exchange for support from the Lakeside team at the election he agreed to give Kisumu one leg of the National Sevens circuit. Present at the talks were Omwela, Aggrey Chabeda, John Akelola, Andrew Okwaro and Paul Okong'o. Kisumu also actively engaged Max Muniafu who was then Director for Development at the Union and argued for the same. Prior to Moshi talks were held with Max, David Akelola, Phillip Ocholla, Andrew Okwaro and Paul Okong'o at the Junction Inn restaurant in Kisumu to push for the same.

Surely enough one of the first acts by Omwela & Chabeda on their election as chair and Secretary of the Kenya Rugby Football Union was to award Kisumu one leg of the National Sevens circuit in early 2003 by 'Executive order'.

Honors List

- 1994= Driftwood 7s Runners Up. Bowl winners Nakuru 10's
- 1997= Bowl League. Driftwood 7s Runners Up
- 1999= West Kenya Shield
- 2001= Kisumu 100 years Cup, Shell Victoria 10s
- 2002= Nakuru 10s Bowl. Christie 7s Bowl. Mwamba Cup Runners Up.
- 2003= Kabeberi 7s Fair Play. Driftwood 7s Shield
- 2004= Dala 7s Shield. Christie 7s Fair Play
- 2005= West Kenya Shield, Dala 7s Shield
- 2006= Driftwood 7s Shield
- 2009= Dala 7s Bowl
- 2010= Nile International 7s Runners Up, Eric Shirley Shield Runners Up
- 2011= Kabeberi 7s Bowl. Nile International 7s Runners Up: Eric Shirley Shield Plate
- 2012= Nile International 7s. Spirit of the National 7s Circuit
- 2013= Nile International 7s. Safaricom Dala 7s Bowl. Kabras Sugar 10s Runner Up. Nakuru 10s Bowl Div II

== Dala Sevens ==
"Dala" means home in Dholuo, the language of the Luo who inhabit Kisumu and its environs. Dala Sevens is about returning rugby home and is hosted by Kisumu RFC. Kisumu Dala Sevens was first hosted in May 2003, with defunct Kenya army side Ulinzi winning that event. The Kenya Rugby Football Union Seven aside competition which was hosted by Kenya Rugby Football Union was awarded to Kisumu RFC and they renamed it 'Dala'. At that inaugural event Saint Mary's School Yala became the first school side to qualify for the Main Cup Competition with school-boy wonder-boy Teddy Omondi in imperious form.

In 2004 Kakamega High School defied all the odds to defeat 1st division sides Nakuru RFC and Nondescripts RFC. The event was dropped from the National Sevens Circuit in 2007 due to dire financial straits on the part of hosts Kisumu RFC before making its return in 2009. 32 teams participate in Dala, making it the biggest event in Kenya, East Africa and probably Africa. Anyway, that was before, Kabeberi, Driftwood, Prinsloo, and Christie's followed suit and expanded their tournament's to 32 teams. The Dala Sevens is the primary fundraising event for Kisumu RFC. Kisumu Polytechnic is the venue of the sevens.

== Dala Sevens Honors List ==
| Year | Winners | Runners up | Most Valuable Player |
|---|---|---|---|
| 2003 | Ulinzi | Kenya Harlequin | Geoff Amuhaya (Quins) |
| 2004 | Impala | Usiu-Africa | Amos Agiro (Usiu) |
| 2005 | Kenya Harlequin | Impala | Teddy Omondi (Quins) |
| 2006 | Kcb | Mwamba | Dennis Mwanja (Kcb) |
| 2007 | Not Played | Not Played | Not Played |
| 2008 | Not Played | Not Played | Not Played |
| 2009 | Nakuru | Kenya Harlequin | Davis Yanga (Nakuru) |
| 2010 | Mwamba | Kenya Harlequin | Horace Otieno (Mwamba) |
| 2011 | Mwamba | Kenya Harlequin | Mike Agevi (Mwamba) |
| 2012 | Kenya | Harlequin Mwamba | Collins Injera (Mwamba) |
| 2013 | Strathmore | Mwamba | Billy Odhiambo(Strathmore) |
| 2014 | KCB | Homeboyz | Ken Moseti (KCB) |
| 2015 | Nakuru | Homeboyz | David Kivuti (Nakuru) |
| 2016 | Homeboyz | Kenya Harlequin | Charles Omondi (Homeboyz) |
| 2017 | Homeboyz | KCB | Charles Omondi (Homeboyz) |
| 2018 | Mwamba | Homeboyz | Eliakim Kichoi (Mwamba) |
| 2019 | KCB | Homeboyz | Vincent Onyala (KCB) |

== Kisumu Rugby Football Club Officers ==
  - Despite its formation in 1982, Kisumu RFC first held elections in late 1990.

KENYA CUP CHALLENGE 2011-

Kisumu RFC finally got into Kenya Cup in a round about way. In 2010 Kisumu had reached the Eric Shirley Shield Final but the deejays from Nairobi in the name of debutants Homeboyz RFC took them to the cleaners in the final played on 17 April 2010 at the University of Nairobi Grounds. Homeboyz also failed to secure promotion on a technicality. They had not been affiliated to the Kenya Rugby Union despite participating and winning the ESS. Kisumu would also not be promoted. Bottom of the table teams Mean Machine RFC and Nondescripts RFC would thus survive in Kenya Cup for another season.

At the KRU Annual General Meeting in March 2011 Michael Mwangi Muthee defeated the incumbent Richard Andwati Omwela garnering 15 votes to Omwela's 9 votes. The other challenger Max Maina Muniafu received 6 votes in one of the hottest elections in recent years. Muthee came to Office with a program called More rugby better rugby. This program or blueprint was aimed at expanding Kenya Cup and two of the beneficiaries included Kisumu RFC and Homeboys RFC. Thus Kisumu were finally in Kenya Cup.

Some of the big names to emerge from Kisumu in recent years are Teddy Omondi(Kenya & Racing Club of Paris), Andrew Amonde(Kenya & KCB), Benjamin Ayimba (Kenya & Nondies), Derrick Wamalwa(Kenya & Racing Club of Paris), Moses Kola(Kenya & Impala), Curtis Olago(Kenya & KCB), Paul Oimbo(Kenya & Impala), Frank Ndong'(Kenya & Impala) and Victor Oduor 'Opong' (Kenya & Quins).

Kisumu Honours Cup.

Kisumu introduced an honours cup to award long serving players and officials in 2019.This was awarded at the Dala 7s on 10/8/2019 at Mamboleo Showground.The first two recipients were Paul Okong'o and David Akelola.KRU Chairman Oduor Gangla and Club Patron Louis Ogingo presented the Cup's
