= Serare School =

Location
- Nairobi Province, Kenya; 1°19′42″S 36°40′19″E

Information
- Type: Private day and boarding school
- Motto: Inyuat (Maa for "Looking Beyond")
- Established: 11 January 1988 (38 years ago)
- Gender: Co-educational (primary school); Girls only (high school)
- Website: serare.ac.ke

Serare School is a privately owned co-educational day and boarding school located about 20 kilometres (12 miles) from the center of Nairobi, Kenya.

It is situated in the peri-urban area between the Karen shopping centre and Ngong township.

== History and operations ==
The school started on 11 January 1988.

It follows the Kenyan 8-4-4 curriculum, which is offered to students from kindergarten to high school level.

The school has three sections – kindergarten, primary school and high school. The kindergarten and primary are co-educational with a firm Christian foundation, whilst the high school section is only for girls. Boarding facilities are available for both the primary and high school sections.

== See also ==
- Christianity in Africa
- Education in Kenya
- List of boarding schools
- List of schools in Kenya
- Religion in Kenya
