= The Green Garden Schools =

Group of private Christian schools in Kenya

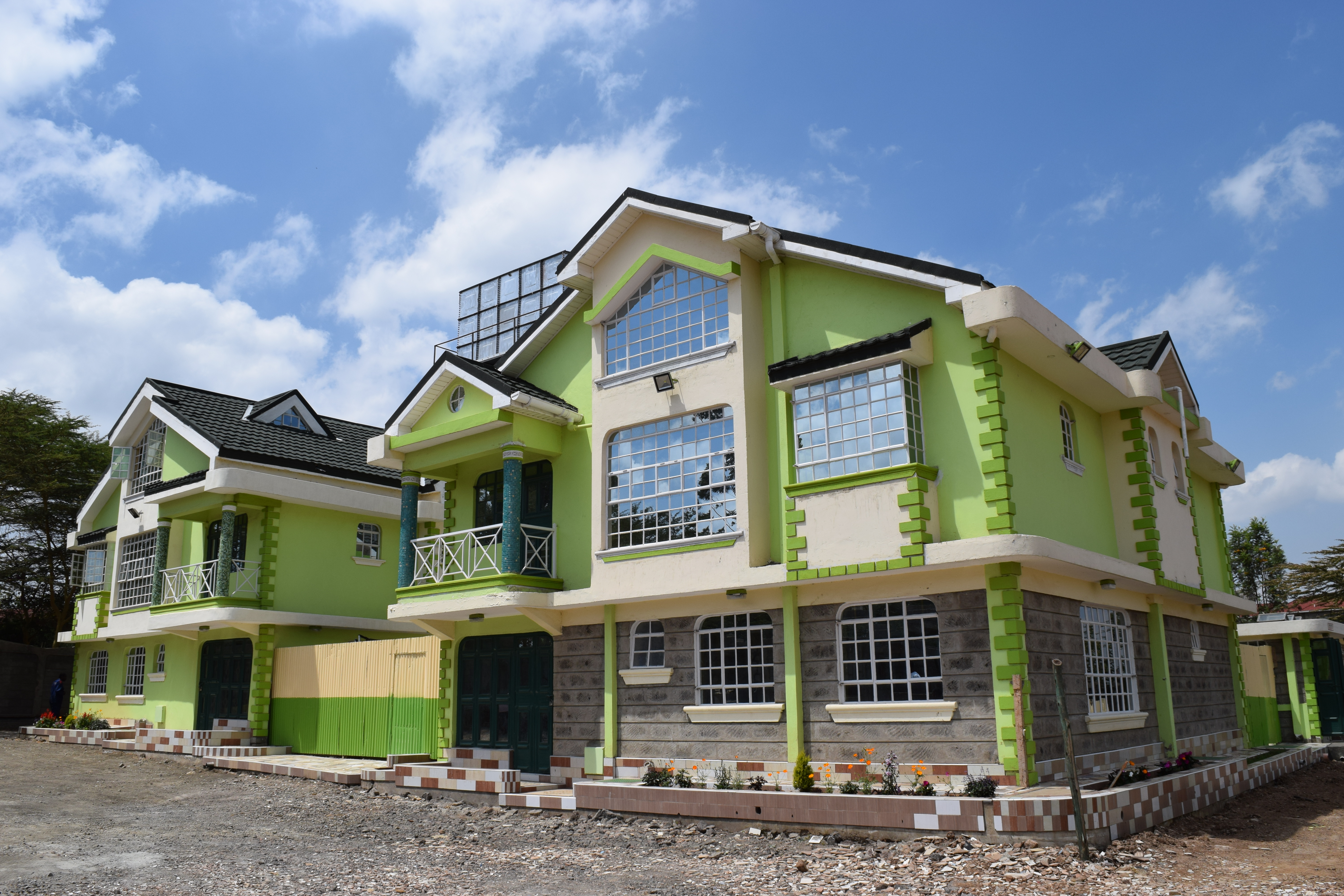
- Rongai Primary Day School, one of the Green Garden Schools
- Kikuyu, Rongai, Nairobi, Central Province; Kenya

Information
- Type: Private schools
- Motto: For the Service of God and Humanity
- Religious affiliation: Christianity
- Established: 1991 (35 years ago)
- Director: Peter N. Keiyoro
- Grades: Nursery to Form 4
- Gender: Co-educational (primary schools); Girls (high school)
- Enrollment: 1,117 (approx)
- Campus: Urban
- Colors: Green and cream
- Publication: The Garden Mirror
- Website: thegreengardenschools.org

The Green Garden Schools are a group of Kenyan private schools located in Kikuyu, Kiambu County, and Rongai just outside Nairobi, Kenya. The schools were founded by Prof. Peter Keiyoro and Esther Njenga in 1991. The schools are independent 8-4-4 curriculum co-educational day and boarding schools offering nursery, primary and secondary schooling.

The Green Garden Schools have been ranked in the top 5 for private school education in Kenya by the Kenya Private Schools Association.

== History and operations ==
Established in 1991, the Christian-based private schools cater for students from preschool through secondary school.

The schools consist of:

- The Green Garden Boarding School – Primary Boarding
- The Green Garden Educational Centre – Primary Day School
- The Green Garden Girls High School – Girls' Boarding School
- The Green Garden Rongai Purple Campus – Primary Day School
- The Green Garden U.S. Office – United States Offices

== Academics ==
The Green Garden Schools follows the Kenyan National Education System structured on an 8-4-4 model with eight years of basic education (2 years of nursery and 6 years of primary school), four years of secondary education and a four years of college education. Students take the KCPE and KCSE at the eighth year of primary school and forth year of secondary school, respectively. The schools have also fully integrated extra-curricular activities into their academic schedule.

== Admission ==
The academic year begins in early January for Term 1, May for Term 2 and September for Term 3. However, entry to the school is on a rolling basis and students may be accepted at any time in the year. Acceptance follows an evaluation of the child's previous academic record, entry assessment tests and placement fit to the schools.

Students come from 15 different countries.

== See also ==
- Christianity in Africa
- Education in Kenya
- List of schools in Kenya
- Religion in Kenya
