= St. Joseph's Rapogi Secondary School =

St. Joseph's School, Rapogi.
- Sare, Migori County; Kenya

Information
- Type: National, public
- Motto: Sharpening for the Future
- Established: 1961 (65 years ago)
- Head teacher: Mr. Erastus Nyagua(2023-present)
- Staff: 86
- Gender: Boys
- Enrollment: 2300 (2023)
- Campus: Rapogi, Migori County
- Website: https://rapogi.mobirisesite.com

St. Joseph's School Rapogi is a county high school for boys situated in Sare in the Nyanza Province of Western Kenya. It is in Migori County.

== History and administration ==
The school was founded in 1961 by Roman Catholic missionaries before it was state-owned public school. 800–900 students attend the school each year and it has a teaching staff of 46. The former school director was Mr. Maurice Ndolo, who succeeded Mr. Thomas KOgolla. Principal Kogolla took over from Mr.Awiti, who also succeeded Hon John Pesa, an accomplished educator turned politician who after his term as Migori Teachers College, was elected as an MP of the Migori Constituency. The school director is Mr. Maurice Otunga, who was the former principal of Ringa boys High School. In 2010, the school population was 902 students but by 2015, the population had risen to around 1500.

== Student life ==
The student body is headed by the school captain (head boy), together with councillors. In 2010, the school introduced a student council body. There is an Old Boys Association "Rapogi Old Students Association (ROSA)" which is a social gathering of old boys.

== School facilities ==
The school has 17 dorms with a capacity of 90 students per dorm. The latest development is the completion of a four-storey dormitory that has greatly eased congestion in the school.

The school is a seven-streamed school in form one to three, the current form fours have a five-streamed class, a total of 26 classes. With the Ministry's stipulated enrollment of 45 students per class, the total student population should therefore be 1035. However, the present population is slightly higher due to high demand. The school admits children from various religious and ethnic groups after an eight-year primary cycle ending with the Kenya Certificate of Primary Education (KCPE) examination.

== Academic performance ==
The school is among the larger educational institutions in southern Nyanza and the former Nyanza Province. In 2004, its graduating class ranked first in Nyanza Province, ahead of Maseno School, Maranda High School, Kanga High School and St. Mary's School Yala. John O. Awiti was identified as the school's principal. In the 2011 examination results, the school ranked second in Nyanza, behind Maranda High School, and 19th nationally.

== See also ==
- Education in Kenya
- List of schools in Kenya
