= Cecilia Wangechi Mwathi =

Kenyan mathematician

- Born: Cecilia Wangechi Mwathi; 15 May 1963
- Died: 17 August 2011 (aged 48); Nanyuki, Kenya
- Citizenship: Kenyan
- Known for: First woman in Kenya to become a mathematics professor
- Scientific career
- Fields: Mathematician, union activist

Cecilia Wangechi Mwathi (15 May 1963 – 17 August 2011) was a Kenyan mathematician and union activist. She was the first woman in Kenya to become a mathematics professor, and was known both for her activism for higher education and for inspiring Kenyan girls to study science, technology, and mathematics.

== Early life and education ==
Mwathi was born on 15 May 1963 in Kaigonde, a village in Kenya near Gichira, as the fifth of eight children in a poor family. She was educated in Gichira, having to walk 5km barefoot to reach the school. She then went to Mugoiri Girls High School and Chania High School before studying mathematics education at Kenyatta University, where she was awarded a bachelor's degree in 1987. In the next years, she worked as a high school teacher at Garissa High School and then Kenya High School. Returning to Kenyatta University in 1991, she earned a master's degree in mathematics in 1992.

From 1995 through 1998, she was a doctoral student at the University of Zimbabwe, while working as a mathematics instructor in Kenya. She completed her Ph.D. at the University of Zimbabwe in 1998; her dissertation was Groups of Units in Algebraic Number Fields of Fourth and Eighth Degrees, and concerned algebraic number theory.

== Academic career and later life ==
Mwathi joined the faculty of the Jomo Kenyatta University of Agriculture and Technology (JKUAT) as an assistant lecturer in 1992. She became a lecturer in 1995 and senior lecturer in 2000.

In 2005 she became secretary general of the UASU-JKUAT faculty union chapter. In 2006, the university became embroiled in a crisis over its failure to pay its faculty in a timely manner, and Mwathi was a leading representative for the faculty in this issue. After the faculty went on strike in October 2006, Mwathi and another union leader, Moses Muchina, were fired from their faculty positions, and in 2008 the Kenyan courts upheld their firing. However, later in 2008, when Mabel Imbuga became vice-chancellor of JKUAT, she announced an amnesty on the issue and reinstated Mwathi to her professorship, conditioned on not pursuing further legal action. Mwathi was named associate professor in 2010.

Mwathi was the hosting chair and convener of the Second Africa Regional Congress of the International Commission on Mathematics Instruction, held at JKUAT in 2007. She also served as editor in chief of the Journal of Agriculture, Science, and Technology, published by JKUAT.

She died on 17 August 2011, in Nairobi Hospital, after a long illness, survived by three daughters and two foster children. JKUAT held a requiem mass in her honor on 24 August 2011.
