= Mountain Park =

Mountain Park may refer to:

== Places ==
=== United States ===
- Mountain Park, Fulton County, Georgia, a small city
- Mountain Park, Gwinnett County, Georgia, a census-designated place
- Mountain Park (Holyoke, Massachusetts), a defunct amusement park
- Mountain Park, New Mexico
- Mountain Park, North Carolina
- Mountain Park, Oklahoma

=== Canada ===
- Mountain Park, Alberta, a ghost town in western Alberta

== Schools ==
- Mountain Park Elementary, New Jersey, an elementary school in Berkeley Heights, New Jersey
- Mountain Park Elementary, Georgia (U.S. State), an elementary school in Roswell, Georgia
- Mountain Park Academy a private school in Nakuru, Kenya
