= Zacharia Mwangi Njeru =

Kenyan politician

Zacharia Mwangi Njeru is a Kenyan politician born in 1966 at Bondeni, a slum in Nakuru.

== Early life and education ==
Zacharia went to Bondeni primary school in Nakuru, and later to Nakuru day secondary school and he finished in Nyandarua High School. In 2015, he enrolled in the Masters of Public Administration program at Mount Kenya University after completing his BSc in Information Science at Moi University. Additionally, he has taken classes at the Kenya School of Government.

== Career ==
Njeru began his career in 1995 as a sales administrator at DT Dobbie before turning to peddling insurance plans. Prior to joining Blueshield as branch manager in Meru, he worked as an executive with Madison Insurance in Eldoret from 1998 to 2000. He was then appointed to the position of regional manager for the company's Rift Valley region (2003–2007), before engaging in politics.

=== Political career ===
Between 2008 and 2013, Njeru was a candidate for the Nakuru City Council and chaired the Finance and Multi-Purpose Committee. In 2010, he was elected chairman of the council's Public Health and AIDS Committee. In his capacity as public health chairman, he was able to start the construction of three clinics and one maternity facility, procure a new ambulance for the division, and start the purchase of a new disposal site.

Since 2015, he had been a sub-county administrator in Nakuru county. He is now the first full cabinet minister from Nakuru county. In 2022 he was nominated as the new Cabinet Secretary of Lands Housing and Urban Development. In early October 2023 Mr Njeru gets reshuffled to the Ministry of Water, Sanitation & Irrigation where he served as Cabinet Secretary until July 2024 when he was dismissed.
