= George Ooro =

Kenyan rugby sevens player

- Born: 3 March 2000 (age 26)
- Height: 186 cm (6 ft 1 in)
- Weight: 82 kg (181 lb; 12 st 13 lb)

Rugby union career
National sevens team
Years	Team	Comps
2023–Present	Kenya	

George Ooro Angeyo (born 3 March 2000) is a Kenyan rugby sevens player. He represented Kenya at the 2024 Summer Olympics in Paris.

He began his rugby career at Chianda High School, where he was noticed by Strathmore University scouts and awarded a scholarship to join the institution.
