= Ogallo Laban =

Professor of Meteorology at Nairobi University, Kenya

Prof Laban Ogallo
- Born: Laban Ayieko Ogallo; 20 January 1950; Kenya
- Died: 20 November 2020 (aged 70); Kenya
- Burial place: Nyahera, Kisumu, Kenya

Academic background
- Education: University of Nairobi.

Academic work
- Institutions: East African Meterelogy Services; University of Nairobi Kenya

Laban Ayieko Ogallo (born 20 January 1950) was a professor of Meteorology at Nairobi University, Kenya. He was one of the pioneers of climate science and meteorology in Africa. He was a former director of the IGAD Climate Prediction and Applications Center, He was a Chairman of the Department of Meteorology, a founding Member of the Kenya Meteorological Society (KMS), African Meteorological Society (AMS), a member of African Academy of Sciences and The World Academy of Sciences. He was also a member of the IPCC team that received the Nobel Peace Prize in 2007

== Early life and education ==
Prof. Ogallo was born in Kenya on 20 January 1950. He obtained his B.Sc. Hons (Maths, Physics and Meteorology) in 1975, M.Sc. (Meteorology) in 1977 and PHD (Meteorology) in 1980 from University of Nairobi.

== Career ==
Prof. Ogallo began his career in 1975 at East African Meteorology Services. In 1976 he was a Tutorial Fellow, Department of Meteorology, University of Nairobi. In 1979 he became a lecturer, senior lecturer in 1986, chairman department of Meteorology in 1988, Chief executive officer (CEO/ Secretary) to Kenya National Council for Science and Technology in 1995, Coordinator of World Meteorological Organisation Climate Applications CLIPS Programme in 1996, Director of IGAD Climate Perdition and Applications Centre in 2000, Coordinator of IGAD and UNDP Disaster resilience capacity building Project and in 1995 he became a full professor.

== Fellowship and membership ==
He was a member of World Academy of Sciences (TWAS), African Academy of Sciences (AAS), Kenya Academy of sciences, Kenya Met Society and was a fellow of the Royal Met Society.

== Death ==
Prof Ogallo died in Aga Khan hospital on 20 November 2020 after a brief illness and was buried on the 5 December 2020 in Nyahera, Kisumu, Kenya.
