= PCEA Silanga High School =

School in Nairobi, Kenya

PCEA Silanga High School is a Christian-foundation based mixed secondary school in Kibera, Nairobi, Kenya. Established in January 2007 by the Presbyterian Church of East Africa, Kibera Parish, under the leadership of the Rev. Samuel Machugu Kamau and Evangelist Isaac Irungu Mwangi, it caters for the educational needs of the Kibera community.

It offers a four-year course of secondary education, Form One to Form Four, leading to a Kenya Certificate of Secondary Education.

It is registered by the Ministry of Education as a formal school, as well as the Kenya National Examinations Council as an Examination Centre.

The school has about 150 students and eight full-time teachers, and offers the 8-4-4 system of education (British Curriculum).

The school partners with the Barrhead Bourock Parish Churches, which is supporting ten students on full scholarships.

The principal is Daniel Misiko Lukorito.

== History ==
The school came into being after an initial meeting in 2006 by members of the Barrhead Bourock Parish Churches, who saw the need and encouraged the local leaders to establish such an institution. This came into being in January 2007 when the then Rev. Samuel Kamau Machugu, Evangelist Isaac Irungu Mwangi, Patrick Gikonyo and Daniel Misiko Lukorito came together and shared the vision with the other leaders, who accepted to start the school.

The school is one of the many projects helping the community, run by the PCEA Kibera Parish. PCEA was formally called the Church of Scotland. The congregations of Bourock Parish and Barhead churches have been in the forefront in supporting the growth of the school through funding projects and structures in the school, as well as sponsoring students.

== Management structure ==
The school has a Board of Governors, who oversee its running. It meets once a month to review the progress of the school. The board comprises the members of the local community, local government representatives, the principal, who is the secretary, members of the church and the local elected peoples' representatives. There are ten board members, who are elected into office every three years.

It also has a Parents/Teachers association, commonly known as the PTA. This team works in coordination with the BOG to see that the right content is covered. The PTA is made of six parents and four teachers who include the principal and the deputy principal.
