= Kenya Muslim Academy =

- Motto: IQRA (Power to read)
- Established: 1993
- Chair: Dr. Ali Hassan
- Head: Mr. Abdirazak Masiga & Mr. Peter Cleveenson
- Location: Huruma, Nairobi, Kenya
- Website: kenyamuslimacademy.co.ke

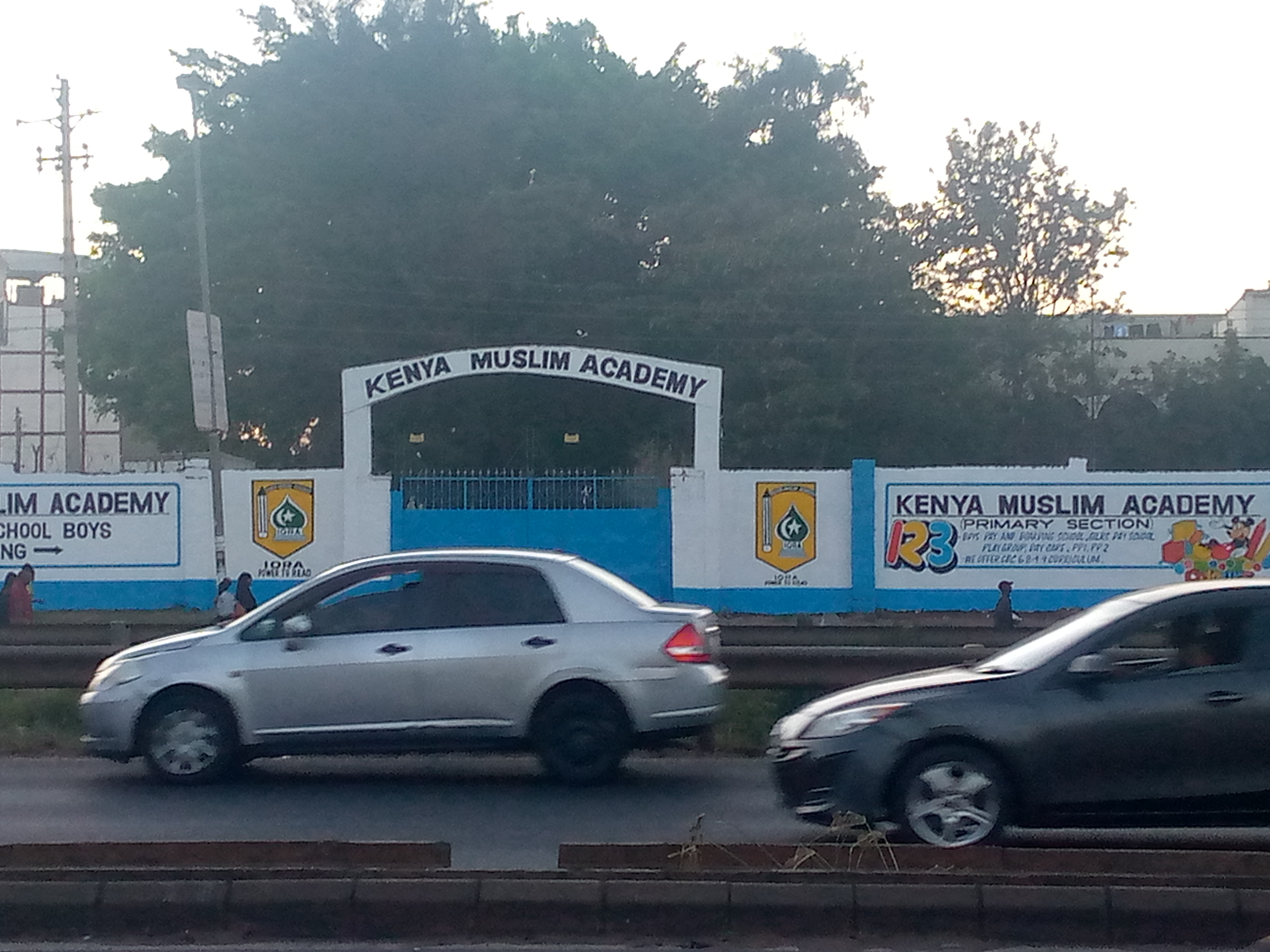
Main gate of Kenya Muslim Academy taken from Kariobangi side

Kenya Muslim Academy is a private primary and secondary school located in Kariobangi, Nairobi, Kenya, admitting both Muslims and non-Muslims. The school was established in 1993 by SUPKEM.

The school is running both primary and secondary levels of education with a good academic performance record. The primary section is fully Islamically integrated; teaching both secular and Islamic subjects such as Quran, Tawhid, Fiqh, Sira, Hadith, Arabic, Tafsir and Tajwid fully taught in Arabic and following the ICDC syllabus.

The secondary section is also integrated offering Arabic language and IRE (Islamic Religious Education) together with secular subjects. There are good boarding facilities for both the secondary and primary sections.

The school has also been under fire due to excessive violence both mental and physical against students (including sexual harassment by teachers, whippings and random misogynistic violence) which has left many students with childhood trauma and illnessest.

Currently, the school is directed by Sheikh Abdukadir and managed by Mr. Aden Abdukadir under a board of management composed of experts from different fields. The board's chairperson is Mr. Ali Hassan.

The head of Islamic department which manages the integrated program is Dr. Hajj Maulid Makokha a graduate from the Islamic University of Madinah, Saudi Arabia.

The school has good educational facilities such as spacious classrooms, science laboratories, a mosque, a library and several playgrounds.

== See also ==
- List of schools in Kenya
