= Malezi School =

Private boarding school in Nairobi, Kenya

Location
- Civil Servants Estate Off Kitengela Road; Lang'ata; Nairobi, 51736, 00200; Kenya
- Coordinates: 1.321700336°S 36.789701615°E

Information
- Type: Private school, Day school, Boarding school,
- Motto: Huduma na Mazinduo
- Sister school: St. Andrew's School, Kisumu
- Principal: Elizabeth Odera
- Head teacher: Margaret Masime
- Gender: Mixed
- Language: English, Swahili, French KCSE; Form 1–4 IGCSE (O-levels); Year 8–11
- Colors: Navy Blue and White
- Sports: Tennis, Basketball, Rugby,
- Team name: Hawks
- Alumni: Joab Odera, Aziza Butoyi, Amadi Kagoma, Teresa Odera, Zack Okong'o, Rahab Mbugua
- Website: www.malezi.org

Malezi School is a private educational institution based in Nairobi, Kenya.

== History ==
Malezi was established in 1989 by Elizabeth and James Odera and began as a nursery school. Since then the school has grown to include primary and high school as well as helping with the formation of its sister school St. Andrews, Kisumu. Malezi has catered to over 5000 students in the last 24 years with alumni landing scholarships to universities such as Vanguard University and Winston-Salem State University The school offers both the 8-4-4 system and more recently the International General Certificate of Secondary Education (IGCSE) system.

== Present Day ==
In late 2013 Malezi decided to offer IGCSE in both high school and elementary school. They are also an SAT and TOEFL test center. The school has partially merged with Sadili Oval to form Sadili Africa Talent Training Academy. A talent school that will develop their students various abilities in sports and the Arts.

== Sports ==
Malezi has a long history in sports and is well known for two sports in Kenya: tennis and basketball. Malezi's tennis team has held the national title for the last nine years and has partnered with schools and Universities both locally and broad such as Haileybury, Repton and Strathmore University to further develop their students abilities though exposure.

The school's basketball team, known as the Hawks, was formed in 2009 and has made it to the provincial semi-finals three times since its formation their latest time in 2013.
