= Nairobi Academy =

Preparatory and secondary school in Karen, Nairobi

Location
- Karen, Nairobi; Kenya

Information
- Established: 1976; 49 years ago
- Founder: Frank Bentley
- Gender: Mixed
- Age: 2 to 19
- Language: English

Nairobi Academy is a preparatory and secondary school located in the Karen suburb of Nairobi, Kenya.

== Establishment ==
The school was founded by educationist Frank Bentley in 1976.

== Operations ==
The school caters to ages 2–19, accommodating both boys and girls, and follows the English National Curriculum. It leads students to take the International General Certificate of Secondary Education at 16+ and A-Levels at 18+. Students undertake examinations through both the Cambridge International Examinations and the Edexcel Boards.

== See also ==
- Education in Kenya
- List of schools in Kenya
