= The Millennium School, Nairobi =

- Nairobi; Kenya

Information
- Age: 2 to 18
- Website: https://www.millenniumglobalnbi.com/

Millennium Global International School is a private, mixed day school located on Peponi Rise, off Peponi Road, in Kitusuru, Westlands, Nairobi, Kenya.

The school offers the Edexcel British Curriculum from Pre Primary, Primary and Secondary (IGCSE and A Levels).

== See also ==
- Education in Kenya
- List of schools in Kenya
