= Mumbuni High School =

School in Kenya

Coordinates: 1°29′27″S 37°15′53″E

Mumbuni Boys' School (also known as Mumbuni School) is an extra county cluster(1) school in Kenya which is located 3 kilometres (1.9 miles) from Machakos town. It is the second largest school in Machakos County, after Machakos School with over 1,200 students.

== History and operations ==
The school was started in 1965 under the sponsorship of the Africa Inland Church (AIC) at a site near Scott Theological College and shifted to the current location in 1975 to accommodate the ever growing number of students.

The school had "A" level classes for boys only during the former education system. The last A-level class sat for exams in 1989.

The school used to be a mixed school but on 7 February 2005, the girls moved across the road to their own school, Mumbuni Girls High School.

== Campus ==
The school spreads over 32 acres.

== Administration ==
The school has had seven principals: Mr. Simon Mwatu (1965–1969), Mr. Daniel K. Mulwa (1969–1986), Mr. Benedict Kavita (1986–1996), Mr. Timothy Mwove (1996–2003), Mr. Julius Kasuni (2003–2008), Mr. Timothy Mutiso Wambua (2009-2017), Mr. Peter Nzioka (2017-2024) and currently, Mr . Peter Kilonzo.

== Notable alumni ==
- Daniel Ndambuki, comedian

== Sports ==
The school is active in various sports such as basketball, football, handball, volleyball, tennis, rugby, swimming, table tennis and lawn tennis.

== See also ==
- Education in Kenya
- List of schools in Kenya
