= Nyang'ori High School =

Location
- Vihiga District; Western Province; Kenya
- Coordinates: 0°01′23″S 34°44′40″E

Information
- Denomination: Christianity
- Established: 1954 (72 years ago)
- Founder: Assemblies of God
- Principal: Mr Lunani Peter
- Staff: 60 teachers
- Gender: Male
- Average class size: 65

Nyang'ori High School is a Kenyan boys' secondary school located in the Vihiga District, Western Province – along the Kisumu Kakamega Highway (6 kilometres (3.7 miles) from Kisumu).

== History and operations ==
The school was established in 1954 under the sponsorship of the Pentecostal Assemblies of God Church, as a teacher training college.

It had a capacity of over 900 students in 2006, and is overseen by the principal, Mr. Ibrahim Kigo.

The school does well in basketball within the region. It has produced Superstars, the likes of Brian Busu, Victor Odendo, Noreh Edwin etc who have played for top premier clubs in Kenya.

Academically, it is ranked among the best performers in the province, after Kamusinga.

With the school being situated in a stony and hilly place, in the dry season it has a water shortage. To counter this problem, boreholes have been dug and underground water storage tanks constructed. Transport is fair in the school; it has two 60-seat buses, an old version and a modern one.

The school was named the most disciplined school in the Western Province in 2007. In 2009, the school was awarded best in the province.

In 2021 a student at the school was arrested for allegedly assaulting other students and killing a school guard.

== See also ==
- Education in Kenya
- List of Assemblies of God schools
- List of schools in Kenya
- Religion in Kenya
