= Kilunda RFC =

(Kenya) Masaku (Kilunda) RFC
- Full name: Kilunda Rugby Football Club
- Union: Kenya Rugby Football Union
- Founded: 1960s
- Location: Machakos, Kenya
- Region: Nairobi Province
- Ground: Machakos Golf Club

Kilunda Rugby Football Club, also known as Kilunda or Masaku RFC, is a Kenyan rugby union club based in Machakos. For the 2015-16 season, the club competed in the Nairobi region of the Nationwide League.

== History ==
The club was founded in the 1960s with the aim of promoting rugby in Machakos. However, over time, due to lack of commitment and exposure, the team fizzled away, only to re-emerge in 2012 at the Masaku Sevens. The inaugural rugby sevens tournament was held at the Machakos Golf Club.
