= Dago Thim Mixed Secondary School =

Coordinates: 0.014°S 34.724°E

Location
- Nyahera, Kisumu County; Kenya

Information
- School type: Secondary school

Dago Thim Secondary School is a Kenyan school located in the Nyahera village in the Ksumu North ward of the Kisumu Town West Constituency of Kisumu County, Nyanza Province.

== See also ==
- Education in Kenya
- List of schools in Kenya
