= Jomo Kenyatta High School =

High school in Nakuru County, Kenya

Coordinates: 0°10′10″S 36°07′50″E

Information
- Former name: Ngwataniro Secondary School
- School type: Boarding school
- Established: 1970s
- Gender: Mixed (taught separately since 2016)
- Enrollment: c.1000 (1990s)

Jomo Kenyatta High School is located in Bahati Division, Nakuru County in Kenya. From the time of inception in the 1970s, it was a Mixed Boarding School until 2016 when it was divided along gender into two separate boys’ and girls’ boarding schools.

== History and operations ==
Initially, this school was known as Ngwataniro Secondary School, but later renamed after the first president of Kenya, Jomo Kenyatta. It was pioneered by, among others, the late Kihika Kimani.

It is located facing the Menengai Crater on the rise towards the Kenyan Eastern Highlands, in the Great Rift Valley. Near a small center known as maili kumi

In the 1990s, the school was one of the largest mixed schools in the province with a population of more than 1,000 students at any given time. By that time, in national ranking it was a District School.

Previous headmasters include Mr Gill Singh, Mr Joseph Njoroge and Mr Joseph B. Gachanja, the latter having retired in 2008 after achieving the mandatory 55 years of age stipulated by the Teachers Service Commission of Kenya. The school admits students from around the country.

Nakuru County also has such schools as Lamurdiac, also established by the late Kihika Kimani.

== See also ==
- Education in Kenya
- List of schools in Kenya
