= Chania High School =

Coordinates: 1.035190°S 37.071421°E

- Thika, Central Province; Kenya

Information
- Former name: MP Shah High School (until 1967)
- School type: Boarding school
- Motto: Esse Quam Videri (To be, rather than to seem (to be))
- Founder: Meghji Pethraj Shah
- Status: Split into two schools
- Closed: 2000
- Gender: Mixed

Chania High School was a public high school located in Thika, in the Central Province of Kenya.

== History and operations ==
The school was formerly known as MP Shah High School until 1967, when it was renamed Chania High School. It used to have both girls and boys, both of whom could board at the school or commute to school every day. It was the only school in Thika that served a wide range of students from diverse cultural, racial, ethnic and religious backgrounds.

The school split in 2000 to Chania Boys' High School and Chania Girls' High School to serve boys and girls, respectively.

The school motto was Esse Quam Videri, meaning "To be, rather than to seem (to be)".

== See also ==
- Education in Kenya
- List of boarding schools
- List of schools in Kenya
