= Maranda High School =

Location
- Bondo, Siaya County; Kenya
- Coordinates: 0°05′17″S 34°13′36″E

Information
- Type: Secondary school
- Motto: Integrity in practice; Put on integrity (formerly)
- Founder: Shadrack Osewe Agot
- Principal: Edwin Namachanja
- Grades: Form 1–4
- Gender: Boys
- Colours: Dark navy blue and white

Maranda High School is a boys' boarding secondary school located in Siaya County, Kenya. The school was founded in 1919 by Shadrack Osewe Agot. It has a good performance record, especially since the inception of the 8-4-4 Curriculum in Kenya. The current principal is Edwin Wafula Namachanja who succeeded Boaz Owino.

== Description ==
The Secondary education institution is approximately 5 kilometres from Bondo and has a consistent long time record in Kenya Certificate of Secondary Education. The principal is Edwin Namachanja. The school as of 2018 had a population of about 2400. Maranda High school is considered a national school under the 8-4-4 curriculum and is one of the top performing schools in Nyanza region (formerly Nyanza Province) of Kenya as well as nationally.

== Academic record ==
The high school ranks consistently in the top 10 schools in Kenya in the Kenya Certificate of Secondary Education examinations, coming in 4th in 2010, 1st in 2011, 7th in 2012 and 2nd in 2014.

== Fires ==
The school closed on 20 September 2012, after a fire in a dormitory that was thought to be caused by an electrical fault. There was another major fire in the school in January 2013, which destroyed two dorms.
