= Kiereni Secondary School =

Kiereni High School

Address
- P O Box 419-60400; Chuka, Kenya
- Coordinates: 0.347988°S 37.643666°E

Information
- Type: Public Mixed
- Motto: "Arise and Shine"
- Established: 1987
- Principal: Muthuri Mugambi
- Website: sites.google.com/site/kierenisecondaryschool

Kiereni High School was started in 1987 by the Presbyterian Church of East Africa and the Community of Mugwe Location. The objective was to provide low cost schooling for the children from the local community and the surrounding districts. The school offers education to boys and girls from form 1 to 4, and is mixed day and boarding. Initially the school admitted up to 160 students, and it has since grown to an enrollment of 594 students.

== Curriculum ==
The school is registered by the Ministry of Education in Kenya and offers the 8-4-4 curriculum leading to the award of the Kenya Certificate of Secondary Education as the final examination at the end of 4th year. Co-curricular activities include games and sports, drama, music, science fair, swimming and many clubs. In 2015 137 candidates sat for the certificate exam and 67 attained university entry points. Staffing has improved from six government teachers in 2009 to 15 in 2016. The school infrastructure has developed from 4 classrooms to 12.

== Management ==
The school is managed by a Board of Management appointed by the Minister for Education in conjunction with the sponsor and community leaders. Parents and teachers are represented on the board by a committee elected by the parents. The school performance in the national examinations has registered positive trends in the last 4 years with 2012 attaining a mean score of 6.8557 and 55 out of 97 candidates qualified for university admission. 30 of the 55 were admitted through JAB.

In 2012 the school acquired a bus at a cost of KSh.5.7 million/=. the bus is used to ferry students to activities such as drama, music, games and educational tours. The school has a link with the Center for International Voluntary Service, which send volunteers to various parts of the world.
