= Ondati Girls Secondary School =

- Nyanza Province; Kenya

Information
- School type: Secondary school
- Established: 2009; 17 years ago
- Gender: Girls

Ondati Girls Secondary School is a community run girls' secondary school in Ondati village, Nyanza, in western Kenya. It is located 18km from Rongo. Established in 2009 the school caters to 100 girls, both day students and boarders. The school receives no government subsidy and is financed through a combination of student fees and income generated from a number of school enterprises.
