= Mountain Park Academy =

Coordinates: 0°15′40.75″S 36°11′34.19″E

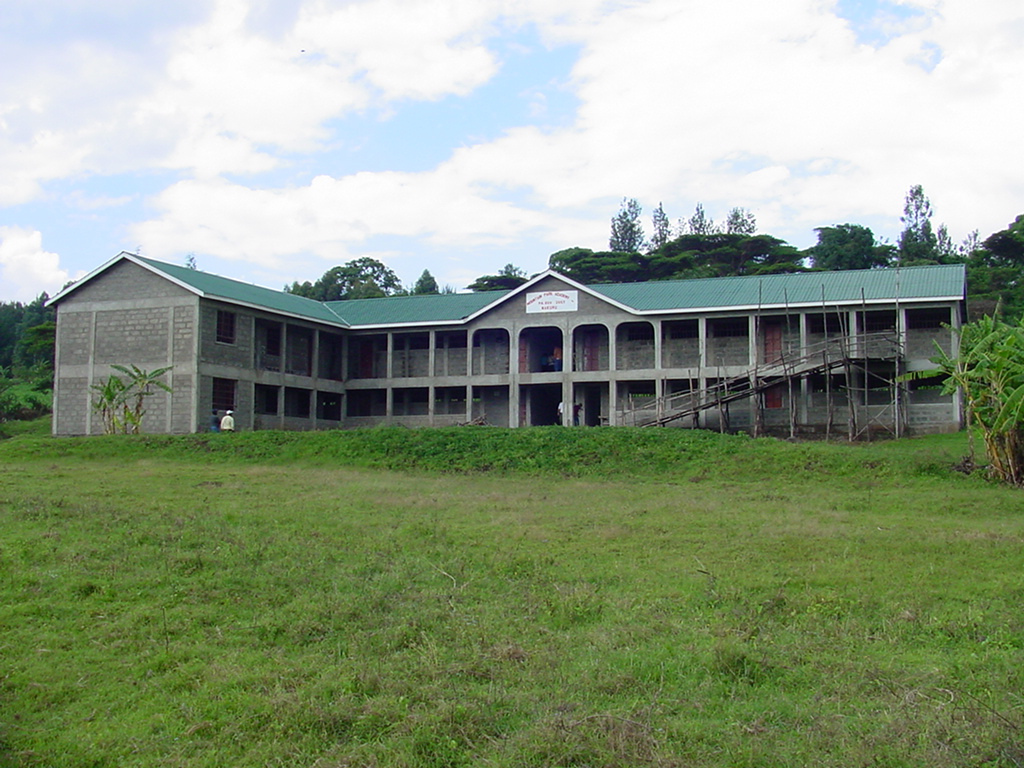

Location
- Nakuru; Kenya

Information
- Established: 2004; 21 years ago
- Capacity: 400

The Mountain Park Academy is a school located in Nakuru, Kenya.

== History and operations ==
The school opened in January 2004.

It consists of eight classrooms and a library and has a capacity of 400 students.

The name Mountain Park is the same name as a church in Stone Mountain, Georgia, United States, that established a partnership with the Robi family who owns and runs the property.

A non-profit organization, the Kenya Project for Education and Spiritual Growth, helps maintain funding for the school, as well as overseeing the sponsorships of children to ensure each student is provided with tuition and books, supplies, and medical care.

== Gallery ==
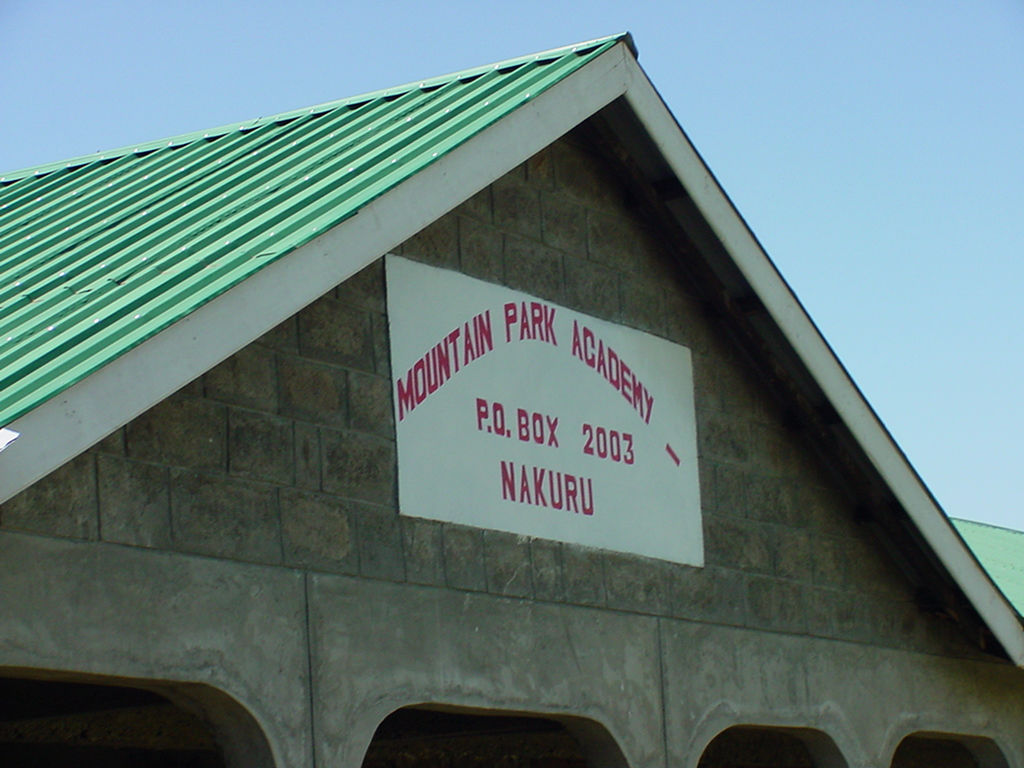
The sign on the front of the school

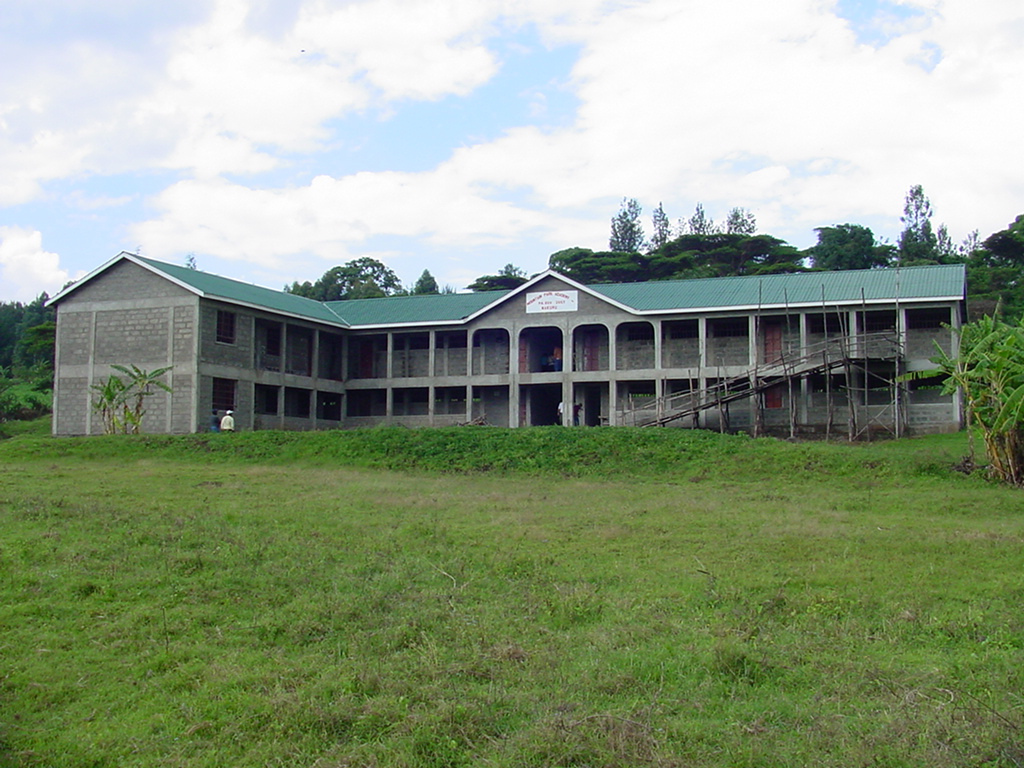
The front of the school

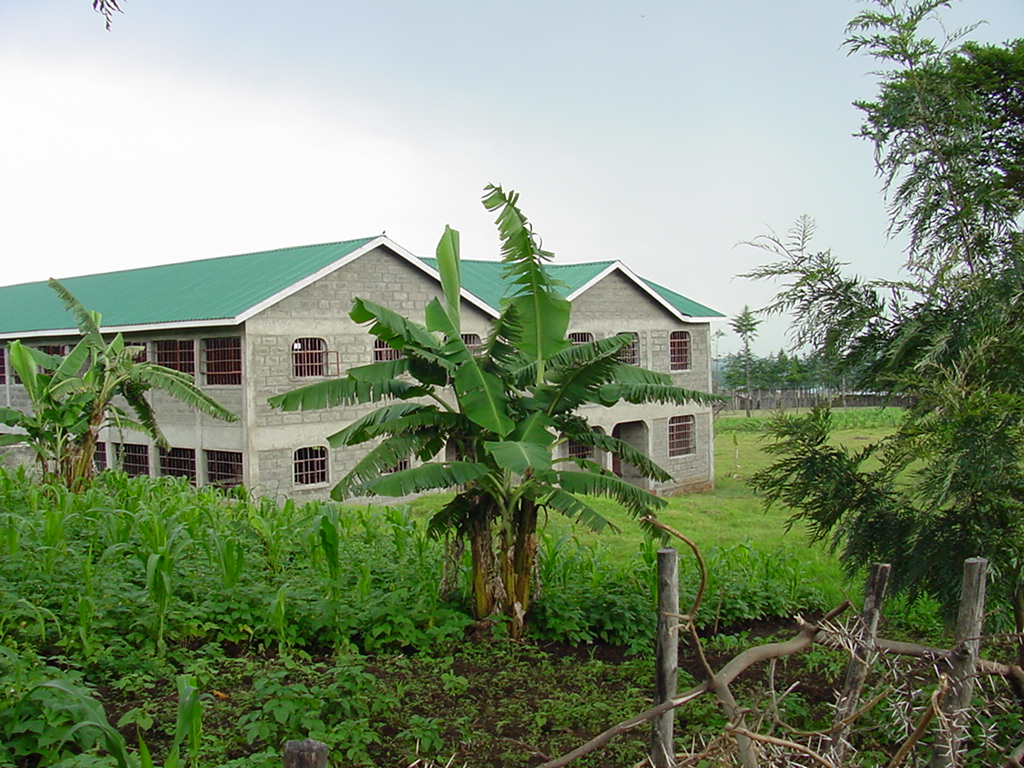
The side of the school overlooked from the road.

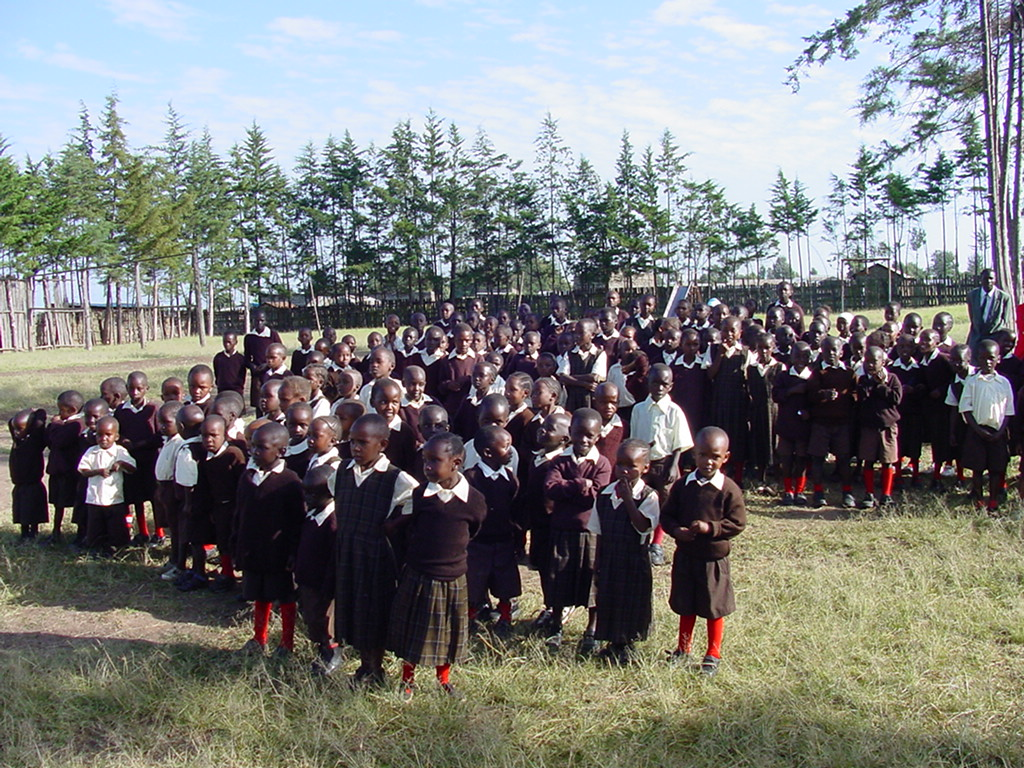
The students gathered for morning assembly.

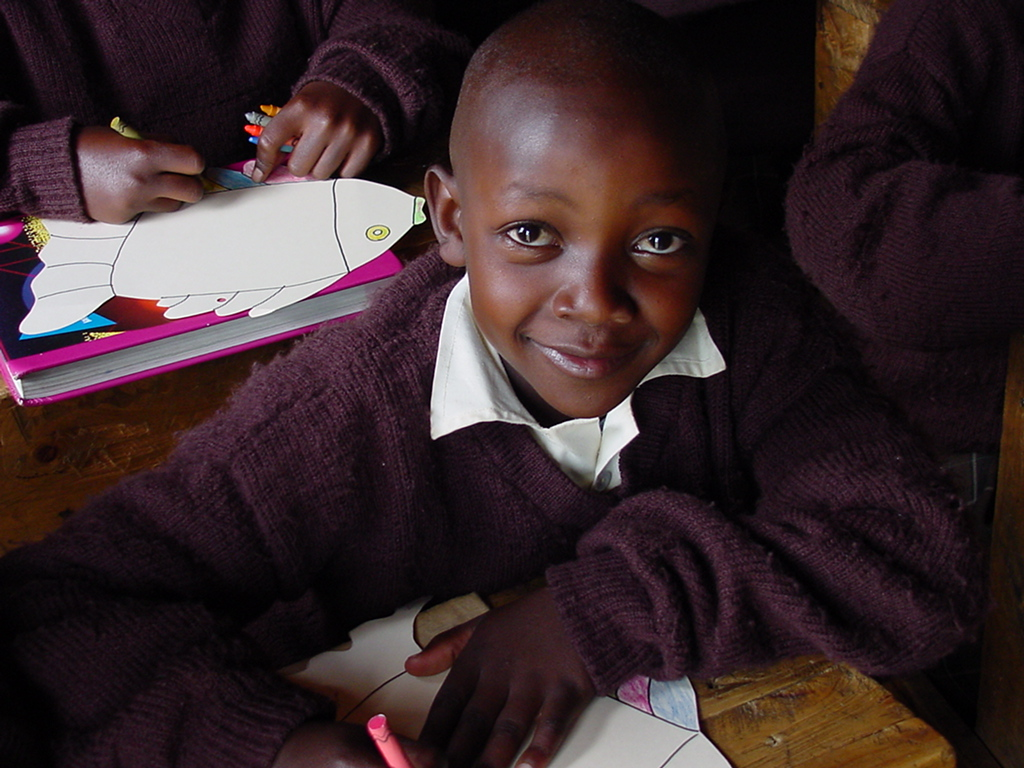
A student working on an assignment in the classroom.

== See also ==
- Education in Kenya
- List of schools in Kenya
