= Meghji Pethraj Shah =

Indian politician and businessman

Meghji Pethraj Shah (15 September 1905 in Dabsang Jamnagar – 30 July 1964) was a Gujarati Jain businessman. He immegrated to Kenya in 1919 to work in a store. He created several businesses starting in 1922 in Kenya, Tanzania and other countries in Africa. He turned philanthropist in 1948.

In Saurashtra, development of libraries owes its origin to Meghaji Pethraj Shah, who made a munificent donation of one crore of rupees. As a result, 150 libraries were started in each district of Saurashtra.

One primary government school was built on his name. M.P. Shah Primary School Nagadia, Kalyanpur, Jamnagar.

He was appointed member of Rajya Sabha from Bombay State for the term 3 April 1956 to 2 April 1962 but resigned on 26 July 1957.
