= Bukhakunga Secondary School =

Secondary school in Kenya

Location
- Kenya

Information
- Motto: Keen to Succeed
- Established: 1975; 50 years ago

St. Patrick's Secondary School, Bukhakunga is a top mixed secondary school in Kakamega North District, Kenya.

== History ==
The school was established in 1975 as a Harambee School, sponsored by the Roman Catholic Diocese of Kakamega. It became a government school in 1989. The school motto is "Keen to succeed". Bukhakunga SS has a partnership with Community Education Services (CES) Canada and CES Kenya. Since 2005 youth orphaned by HIV/Aids have received tuition scholarships to attend Bukhkunga SS. Ten students are supported each year by Canadian students in Dufferin Peel Secondary Catholic Schools located in Ontario, Canada.

== Co-curricular activities ==
In 2002, the school appeared at the Western Provincial Science Congress held in Butere Girls' High School. In 2004, the school participated in choral verses during the Kenya Secondary Secondary School Music Festival up to National level.

== National examination registration ==
The School National Examination Code is 614601.

== Student population and welfare ==
The school population is about 500 students, the ratio of girls to boys being about 1:2. Most of the students come from the nearby primary Schools, including Mutsuma, Musidi, Bukhakunga, Sawawa, Namirama, Mayuge, Burundu, and Imbiakalo. A few students are beneficiaries of Canadian Education Society Scholarships, a non-governmental organisation based in the Provincial Capital, Kakamega.

== Facilities ==
There is a bore-hole supplying the school and neighbouring homes with water. The school has some land for agriculture projects.

Some milk animals are reared to supply the staff with milk. The school has a single laboratory shared by all Science students in Physics, Chemistry and Biology. There are some books for reference donated to the school from Canada, though no formal library. The school has purchased examination preparation books. The school has a playground that hosts local football matches.

== Accessibility ==
There is road network coverage to and from the school, but the roads to the west of the school become muddy during rain seasons. There is mobile phone network coverage around the School.
