= Nationwide League (Kenya Rugby Union) =

The Nationwide League is a domestic Kenyan rugby union competition. Full members of the Kenya Rugby Union that do not participate in the top tier Kenya Cup are entitled to participate in the league. It operates in a system of promotion and relegation with the Kenya Cup. Matches are played on Saturday afternoons, usually before fixtures in the Kenya Cup.

For the 2015-16 tournament, sixty four competing teams are divided into seven regional pools in a single round-robin league with the top teams proceeding to a knock-out competition. Six teams will earn promotion to a newly formulated Kenya Cup 2 tournament

After the round of fixtures played on 6 February 2016, eight teams were withdrawn for failure to honor matches

== 2016-2017 Teams ==
=== Nairobi Region ===
==== Pool A(Universities) ====
- Technical University of Kenya
- United States University - Africa
- Africa Nazarene University
- Daystar University
- KCA University
- Mount Kenya University - Nairobi
- Multimedia University of Kenya
- Kenya Methodist University - Nairobi
- Co-operative University College Kenya
- Nairobi Aviators

==== Pool B(Clubs) ====
- Mwamba III
- Community Rugby Association(Comras)
- Masaku RFC
- Stormers RFC
- Brumbies RFC
- Machakos RFC
- Makueni RFC
- Dagoretti Bulldogs
- Ngong RFC
- Eastlanders RFC
- Northern Suburb Cubs

=== Western Region ===
==== Pool A ====
- Siaya RFC
- Maseno University
- Homa Bay RFC
- Mbale RFC
- Christ is the answer ministries - Kisumu(CITAM)

==== Pool B ====
- Bungoma RFC
- Shieywe
- Masinde Muliro University
- Webuye RFC
- Mount Kenya University - Kakamega
- Kakamega RFC
- Kakamega Welfare

=== Rift Valley Region ===
==== Pool A ====
- Kitale RFC
- Koisagat
- Eldoret RFC
- Eldoret Falcons
- KPA Eldoret

==== Pool B ====
- Molo RFC
- Egerton University
- Menengai Oilers
- Kericho RFC
- Kabarak University
- Nakuru KITI

=== Coast Region ===
- Spartans RC
- Technical University of Mombasa Marines
- Taita Taveta University
- Shepherds RFC
- Malindi RFC
- Coast Raiders
- Pwani Sharks RC
- Shoxxs RFC Taita

=== Central Region ===
- Mount Kenya University - Thika
- Kiambu RFC
- Dedan Kimathi University
- Embu RFC
- Chuka Vikings
- Murang'a RFC
- Karatina University
- Zetech Rugby
- Nanyuki Jackals

== Champions ==
Season	Champions	Runners-up
2015-16	Catholic Monks	United States University - Africa
2014-15	Thika RFC	Bungoma Sharks RFC
2013-14	Kabras Sugar RFC	Catholic Monks
