= Nyahera =

Nyahera village is one of the divisions in Kisumu west sub-county, Kisumu County in Nyanza province of Kenya.

Nyahera division has 25 registered schools (16 primary schools,8 secondary and one tertiary inst). Ogada Secondary school, and Dago Thim Mixed Secondary School are some of the schools within the location.
