= Nyandarua High School =

School in Kenya

Coordinates: 0.20130°S 36.37694°E

Nyandarua High School is a government National mixed school in Ol Kalou, Nyandarua County Kenya, with about 800 students and four streams. It was established in 1965 and officially opened as a mixed school in 1967. It is among the top county schools and top 100 in the country. The school is led by G.S Muchiri.
