= Religion in Kenya =

Religion in Kenya (2019 census)
1. Protestantism: 33.4%
2. Evangelicalism: 20.4%
3. Catholicism: 20.6%
4. African-initiated church: 7.00%
5. Other Christian: 4.10%
6. Islam: 10.9%
7. Other religion: 1.80%
8. No religion/Do not know/Did not state: 1.80%

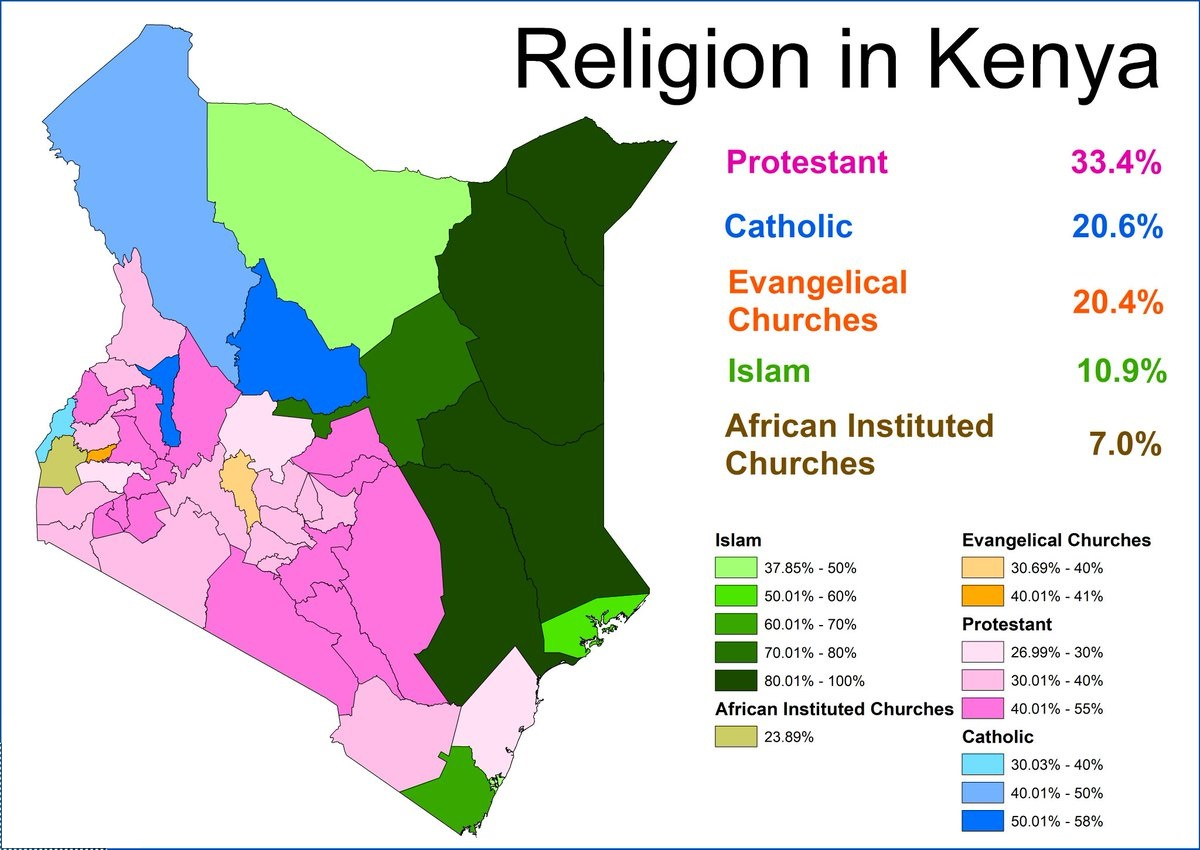
Dominant religion by district in Kenya, 2019

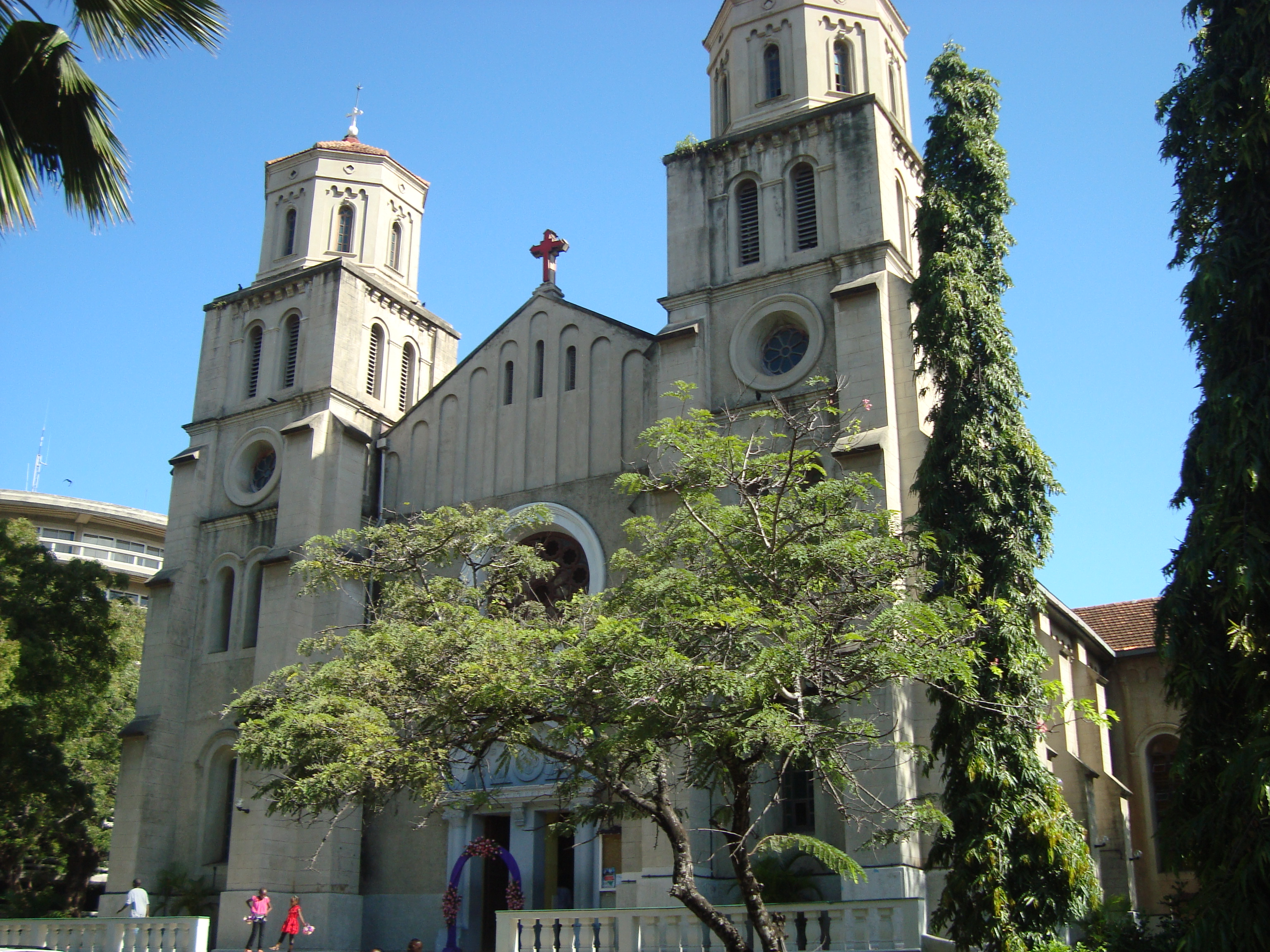
Holy Ghost Cathedral, Mombasa

Christianity is the dominant religion in Kenya, adhered to by an estimated 85.5% of the total population. Islam is the second largest religion in Kenya, practiced by 10.9 percent of Kenyans. Other faiths practiced in Kenya are Baháʼí, Buddhism, Hinduism and traditional religions.

Kenya is a secular state and freedom of religion is enshrined in the nation's constitution. Christmas and Easter are recognised as public holidays.

== Statistics ==
According to the Census figures from 2009 and 2019: Christianity grew by 2.2% whilst Islam declined by 0.35%.

=== Census figures ===
Religions in Kenya by Census
Religion	2009	2019
Protestant	48%	33.42%
Catholicism	23.46%	20.6%
Evangelicals	–	20.44%
Muslim	11.21%	10.86%
African Instituted Churches	–	6.97%
Other Christian	11.87%	3.67%
No Religion	2.4%	1.6%
Other Religions	1.45%	0.99%
Traditional	1.65%	0.68%
Orthodox	–	0.43%
Hindu	0.14%	0.13%
Buddhism	0.16%	0.16%
Total	100%	100%

== Christianity ==
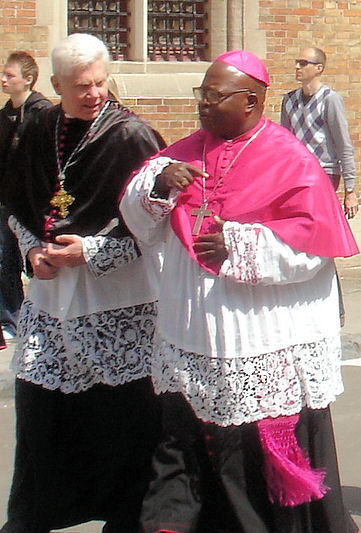
Mgr. Zacchaeus Okoth

Major Denominations	Members (millions)
Roman Catholic	10
Anglican	5
Presbyterian	4
Orthodox	0.2
Adventists	0.5
Lutheran	0.1
Methodist	0.3

Roman Catholicism is the largest single Christian denomination in Kenya. Kenya has about 10 million Roman Catholics. Roman Catholicism was first brought to Kenya in the fifteenth century by the Portuguese, and was spread rapidly during the 20th century by missionaries. In 2019, the Roman Catholic Church made up 20.6% of the population, about 9.7 million Kenyans. In the same year, over 30% of Kenyans identified as Protestant, 20% identified as Evangelical, and 7% identified as members of African instituted churches.

Protestant or Evangelical denominations include the Anglican Church of Kenya, Africa Inland Mission, Seventh-day Adventist Church, the Presbyterian Church of East Africa, Evangelical Lutheran Church in Kenya (ELCK) (and the smaller Kenya Evangelical Lutheran Church (KELC)), and the Baptist Convention of Kenya among others.

An estimated 30-35% of Kenya's population are Pentecostals.

In 2017, Kenya had the highest number of Quakers of any country in the world, with around 119,285 members.

The Eastern Orthodox Church has over 200,000 members making it the third largest Orthodox Church in Sub-Saharan Africa (after the Oriental Orthodox Ethiopian Orthodox Tewahedo Church and Eritrean Orthodox Tewahedo Church). (Note: However, according to a 2011 report by Pew Research Center: Religion & Public Life, by 2010 the Eastern Orthodox Church in Kenya had over 650,000 members.) In 2016 two new dioceses were created within the Orthodox Archdiocese of Kenya, namely the Diocese of Nyeri and Mount Kenya, as well as the Diocese of Kisumu and West Kenya, both falling under the Archdiocese of Nairobi, which has been presided over by Archbishop Makarios (Tillyrides) since 2001.

Other statistically significant non-Catholic and non-Protestant movements include the New Apostolic Church, Jehovah's Witnesses, United Pentecostal Church International, and Branhamism. The non-Protestant and non-Catholic groups make up about 11.8% of the population.

As of the end of 2019, The Church of Jesus Christ of Latter-day Saints claimed more than 14,000 members in 54 official congregations in Kenya. There are also five Family History Centers in Kenya, along with an employment resource centre in Nairobi. Joseph W. Sitati, a native of Kenya, is a general authority of the church and current president of the Africa Central Area, which oversees the church's activities in about 16 countries on the African continent. The church has announced plans to build a temple in Nairobi, with it still in the planning stages, as of early 2021. The church has two stakes in Nairobi, with other areas either having districts or branches, who are directly overseen by the missions, although the church does not yet have a presence in much of the country. The church previously had one mission based in Nairobi, although Mombasa was in the Tanzania Dar es Salaam Mission, which was organized in July 2020, while a small area along the Ugandan border was in the Uganda Kampala Mission.

Due to the proposed law of the right to worship, there has been a tremendous increase in the number of churches in the country recently.

A 2015 study estimated there to be some 70,000 Christian believers from a Muslim background in Kenya.

== Islam ==
Islam is the religion of 10.91% of the population. Most Muslims in Kenya are Sunni, mostly of the Shafii school of Islamic law. Approximately 8% are non-denominational Muslims, 7% identify themselves as Shia and about 4% identify themselves as Ahmadi Muslims, as well as a small proportion of Ibadism practitioners. Muslims are concentrated mainly in the Coastal and North Eastern Regions. Nairobi has several mosques and a notable Muslim population. There are large and historically significant populations of Somali and Swahili Muslims on the coast (most notably in Mombasa, Lamu and Malindi), in the Western Provinces, and smaller numbers of Arab and South Asian Muslims.

Religious Shari'ah courts, called Kadhi courts, are given jurisdiction over certain civil matters such as divorce and inheritance under the constitution of Kenya. Muslims have complained that they are targeted and discriminated against by the government, particularly since the 1998 United States embassy bombings in Nairobi and elsewhere.

== Traditional African religions ==
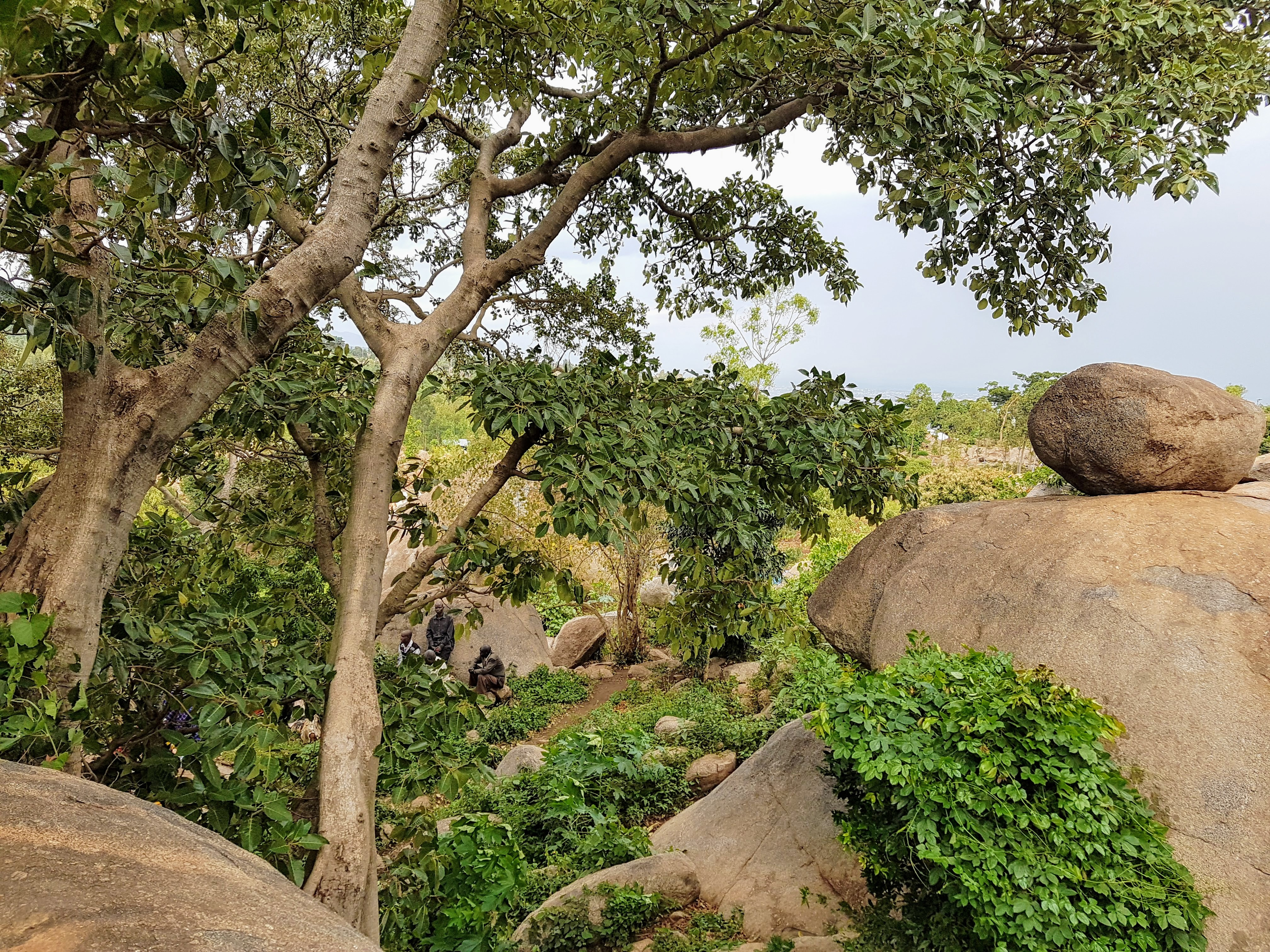
Place of worship in Kisumu County

African religions are typically based on natural phenomena and reverence to ancestors. The dead are presumed to merely transform into another state of being and capable of bringing good fortune or calamity to the living. Most religious rites are therefore centred on appeasing the dead through sacrifices and proper burial rites. The dead's wishes must also be followed to the letter.

Followers of the traditional Kikuyu religion believe Ngai resides on Mount Kenya and say their prayers facing the mountain. Followers of the traditional Mijikenda religion have their holy shrines in the forests where they offer sacrifices and pray.

The Maasai, Kisii, Turkana, Samburu, and Pokot tribes also have significant numbers of persons adhering exclusively to traditional African religions.

== Hinduism ==
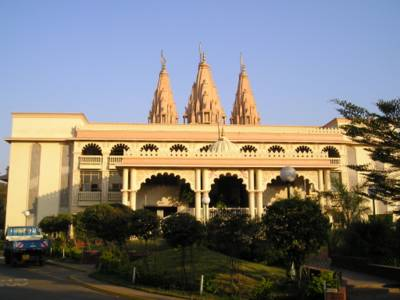
Hindu temple in Nairobi.

There are ethnically Gujarati Hindus living in Kenya. The numbers are estimated to be around 60,287 people or 0.13% of the population. They are mainly located in the capital of Kenya, Nairobi, and other urban areas such as Mombasa, Eldoret, Thika, and Kisumu.

== No religion ==
In the 2019 Census, 755,750 people reported themselves as having "no religion". This is 1.6% of the total, making this group larger than the groups reporting themselves as traditionalists, Hindus, or other religion. 73,253, 0.16%, reported that they did not know their religion. There is a stigma against people who are atheists in Kenya. A Gallup poll conducted in 2012 found that 90% of Kenyans considered themselves "a religious person", 9% considered themselves "a non religious person", while 1% define themselves as "a convinced atheist", placing Kenya in the top 10 religious populations in the world.

== Buddhism ==
Since 1999, Buddhism has grown in Kenya. There are more than 1000 Buddhists in Kenya. Buddhism is also one of the fastest growing religions in Kenya.

Nairobi Buddhist Vihara/Temple is the main centre of Buddhism in Kenya. Nairobi Vihara conducts missions and meditation programs to promote Buddhism in Kenya.

== Baháʼí Faith ==
Baháʼí Faith is present in Kenya since 1945, almost 1% of the population follows this faith. In the 1990s the Baháʼís in Kenya participated in a nationwide community health project including vaccinations, maintaining latrines, and developing clean water sources.

== Freedom of religion ==
Kenya has no state religion and freedom of religion is enshrined in the nation's constitution.

In 2023, the country scored 2 out of 4 for religious freedom; this was mainly due to Shabaab terror threats against Christians and consequential intimidation of local Muslims. Most of these incidents have taken place in the north-east of the country.

== See also ==
- Roman Catholicism in Kenya
- History of the Jews in Kenya
- 2019 Kenya Population and Housing Census
