= 8-4-4 Curriculum in Kenya =

Educational program in Kenya

The 8-4-4 System educational program is a system of education in Kenya with eight years of primary education, four years of secondary education and four years of university education. The system was introduced in 1985 to replace the 7-4-2-3 curriculum, which consisted of seven years of primary school (classes 1–7), four years of lower secondary school (form 1–4), two years of upper secondary school (form 5–6) and three years of higher education. The 7-4-2-3 system had been adopted when Kenya was part of the initial East African Community. Following the introduction of 8-4-4, CPE (Certificate of Primary Education) became KCPE (Kenya Certificate of Primary Education) while KACE (Kenya Advanced Certificate of Education) became the Kenya Certificate of Secondary Education (KCSE). Primary school was made free and mandatory, and secondary and higher education were subsidized by the government.

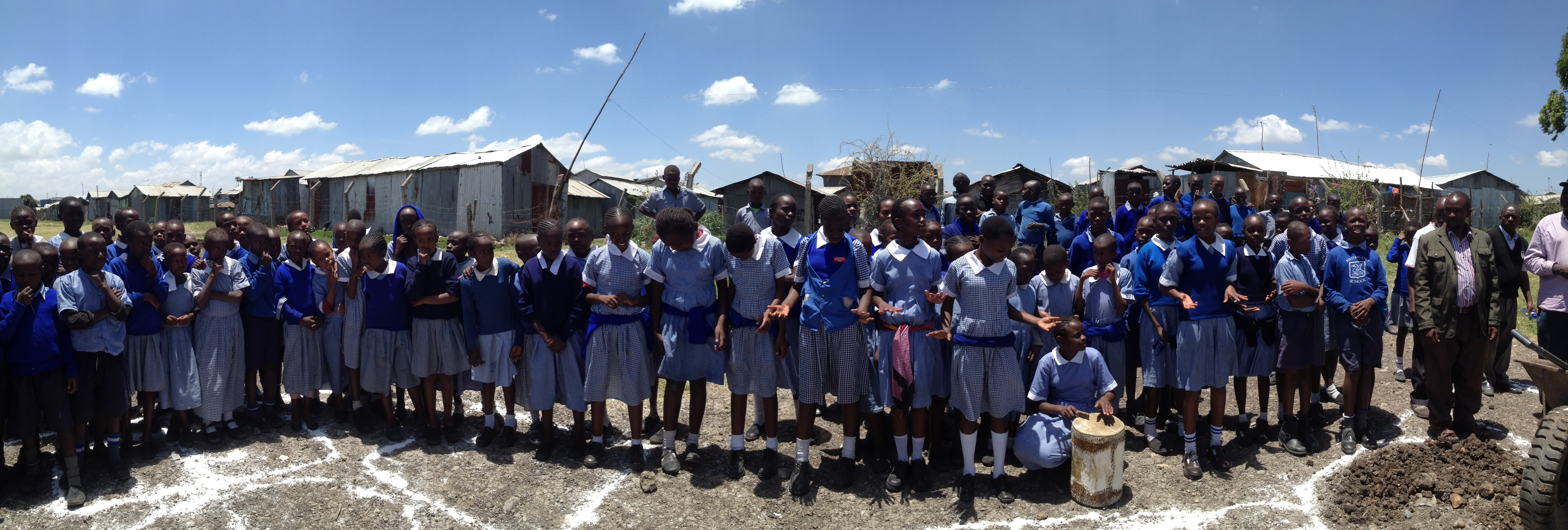
Kenyan Students gather outdoors around the ground breaking ceremony. As part of the project, new toilets will turn human waste into enough energy to power the school.

== History ==
Since 1985, public education in Kenya has been based on an 8-4-4 system, with eight years of primary education followed by four years of secondary school and four years of college or university. Prior to the 8-4-4 model, Kenya's education system was structured as 7-4-2-3 curriculum.

=== The 7-4-2-3 System ===
During the end of colonization, many African countries were going through changes as they gained their independence. Before Kenya was its own country, education was divided by racial lines. This created three separate education systems, African education, Asian education, and European education. Each was structured based on the colonial ideology of the levels of intelligence each race was believed to have. According to them,Africans were as intelligent as the average 7-8 year old European boy, therefore they mostly incorporated the European education into the African education system. Independence triggered changes brought upon by difference in content of history and geography among single nations. Kenyan Identity was a priority while the nation was learning how to be unified with the other two East African countries; Uganda and Tanzania. These three countries joined to form the East African Community in 1967 and adopted the 7-4-2-3 system of education.

Ten years later (1977), the East African Community disintegrated, however, Kenya went on to use this system for 8 years. In the year 1985, Kenya's former President Daniel arap Moi established the 8-4-4 system of education. This system replaced the 7-4-2-3 system and it is made up of 8 years of primary education (classes 1–8), 4 years of secondary education (form1-4), and 4 years of university education.

=== The 8-4-4 System ===
The 8-4-4 system that consists of 8 years of primary education, 4 years of secondary education, and 4 years of university education is attended by students who have completed two years of pre-school education (aged 3–6 years old). The system's main purpose was to improve the development of self-expression, self-discipline and independence. With the change in the education system, came the change in the primary national test from CPE(Certificate of Education) to KCPE(Kenya Certificate of Primary Education) and the secondary national test from KCE(Kenya Certificate of Education) to KCSE(Kenya Certificate of Secondary Education).

Comparisons of Education Systems in Kenya
7-4-2-3 System	8-4-4 System
Once shared by the 3 East African Countries (Kenya, Uganda, and Tanzania)	Implemented in Kenya Only
7 years of primary school education	8 years of primary school education
4+ and additional 2 years of upper secondary education	Only 4 years of secondary school education
3 years of university education	4 years of university education
CPE (Certificate of Education)	KCPE (Kenya Certificate of Primary Education)
KCE (Kenya Certificate of Education)	KCSE (Kenya Certificate of Secondary Education)

The 8-4-4 curriculum offers Science, Social Studies, Kiswahili, English, Math, Religious education, Creative arts, Physical Education (PE), and life skills studies at the Primary level. The system offers an estimate of thirty subjects grouped in 6 categories (Languages, Science, Applied Sciences, Humanities, Creative Arts, and Technical Subjects). Students are then tested in four of the subjects groups in their KCSE examination. A grade of C+ is the minimum required for admissions into Kenyan Universities.

Subjects groups offered in Secondary Schools
Learning Areas	Subjects
Languages	English, Kiswahili, Arabic, German, French
Science	Mathematics, Chemistry, Physics, Biology
Applied Sciences	Home Science, Agriculture, Computer Studies
Humanities	History, Geography, Religious Education, Life Skills, Business Studies
Creative Arts	Music, Art and Design
Technical Subjects	Drawing and design, Building/Construction, Power and Mechanics, Metal work, Aviation, Woodwork, Electronics

In 2027 the last class of the 8-4-4 curriculum is to do their national examination (K.C.S.E) making them the last class to do the 8-4-4 system.

== Curriculum availability ==
Kenyan independence triggered a lot of changes as time went by. The country experienced a significant growth in school enrollments as well as population growth. The country was at a risk of experiencing deteriorating quality of education. This pushed the government to alter their educational system by adjusting the length of the education cycles and the curriculum content. The then president Daniel Arap Moi, acknowledged that Kenya needed the appropriate educational system that will be sufficient quantitatively and qualitatively. The emphasis on this meant that the country was depending on education to be a vehicle for socio-economic development and social justice for all citizens, and the eradication of poverty.

Due to the increasing public demand for more schools, the government called to the citizens and banks to fund the expansion of educational facilities especially in regions that were disadvantaged during the period before independence. Young teenage girls were significantly affected during the period before the 8-4-4 system. Due to the fact that the primary education in the previous educational system ended at year 7 and the high school level was not viewed as mandatory, most females lacked the opportunity to advance to the high school level of education and a high percentage of them ended up pregnant or married.

One way the system sought to reduce teenage fertility was to directly improve girls’ knowledge about family planning; another was to give them alternative opportunities via schooling. The majority of programs are of the first kind: they are aimed at enhancing young people's ability to avoid early childbearing and directly influence the process of decision making by adolescent girls at the time of choice. The 8-4-4 system allowed for an additional year in primary school to aide in enhancing their decision-making skills needed to make important lifestyle choices. The 8-4-4 system made primary school available and free in order to keep up with the demand and also give quality education that essentially was to help the economy. Study shows that higher levels of education decrease by at least 10 percentage points the probability of giving birth when still a teenager. Knowing that the probability of having one's first child before age 20 when having at least completed primary education is about 65%, this entails a reduction of about 15% of teenage fertility rates (for those having at least completed the KCPE). One additional year of school curbs the probability of becoming a mother each year by respectively 7.3 and 5.6% for women with at least a primary and at least a secondary degree.

The system allowed women to gain significant access to schooling. The proportion of girls attending primary school dramatically rose from 341 in 1963 to near-parity in 1986; at secondary school, the proportion has rose from 32% to over 40% over the period.

=== Cost ===
In January 2003 President Mwai Kibaki re-introduced free education which even allowed the oldest person to enroll in primary school to attend his primary schooling. Kimani Maruge, decided to attend primary school at the age of 84 and was able to live out his dreams of becoming a head boy at the age of 86.

At the secondary level, the well performed students enjoy the privilege of attending national schools and receiving full funding for their tuition. The under performed students get a chance to attend district schools but the downside to that is that they have to pay for the tuition out of pocket.

Unfortunately, even with the 8-4-4 system, the percentage of students who go on to attend university is still low. One reason is because the wealthy or well off families are able to send their children to foreign Universities. Another reason is that the cost is not affordable to many yet. Statistics on education show that regional disparities still exist despite the excellent national record. The semi-arid areas, the parastatic areas and areas where the Muslim religion is predominant had lagged behind other areas in education. Due to that and more, the system experiences constant changes to be more accommodative. Changes to the 8-4-4 system were as recent as the year 2020.

=== 2-6-6-3 Educational system ===
Kenya introduced the new Competency Based Curriculum (CBC) in 2017 to replace the 8-4-4 system. The new curriculum was implemented in the primary level from classes 1–5. With its gradual introduction, the government's vision is to organize the curriculum as follows: Basic Education will be divided into three levels: Early education, middle school education and senior school education. The Competency-Based Curriculum consists of a 2-6-3-3-3 system that is divided as follows:

- 2 years in pre-primary education
- 6 years in primary education
- 6 years in junior and senior secondary education
- 3 years(minimum) in university education

Furthermore, lessons taught will only last 30 minutes, 10 minutes lesser than the 8-4-4 system. There shall be five lessons in a day for pre-primary school pupils and seven for their lower primary counterparts. Across the first term, pre-primary school will have five lessons on language activities, five on mathematics activities, five on environmental activities, eight on psychomotor and creative activities, one on religious activities and another on Pastoral Programme of Instruction (PPI).

The first cohort of students under the Competency Based Curriculum to transition from Upper primary to junior High School joined in early 2023. The government has been constructing more classrooms in existing secondary schools across the country to accommodate the junior high learners.

==== Early Years Education ====
Early education includes pre-primary and lower primary education that will take five years. The five years will consist of two years of pre-primary and three years of lower primary school education. In the two years of primary educations, schools will offer language, mathematical, environmental, psychomotor and creative, and religious education activities. When it comes to lower primary education, schools will offer subjects such as Literacy, Kiswahili Language including the Kenya Sign Language in order to be inclusive of deaf students, English Language, Indigenous Language, Mathematical, Environmental, Hygiene and Nutrition, Religious Education and Movement and creative Activities.

==== Middle School Education ====
The middle school level on this new system is made up of three years of upper primary school education and three years of lower secondary education to total six years of middle school education. The first three years of the upper primary school education will offer

- English
- Kiswahili
- Sign language
- Home science
- Agriculture
- Science and technology,
- Mathematics
- Religious Education (CRE/IRE/HRE),
- Creative Arts
- Physical and Health Education,
- Social Studies.

At this level, schools will offer an optional foreign languages (Arabic, French, German, Mandarin). The next three years of lower secondary education, grades 7, 8, and 9 and grades 10, 11 and 12, will allow graduates of primary school Grade 6 to join lower secondary at Grade 7. Lower secondary will expose the learner to a broad based curriculum to enable them to explore their own abilities, personality and potential as a basis for choosing subjects according to career paths of interest at the senior school.

In Grade 4 learners will be introduced to the optional subjects offered at upper primary so as to make informed choices at Grade 7. Learners in lower secondary will undergo a rigorous career guidance program and be exposed to the related subjects to enable them to make informed choices as they transit to senior school.

Subjects for Lower Secondary School are divided in two categories; core and optional subjects. At this level, a broad based curriculum is offered to enable the learner to explore their own interests and potential as a basis for choosing subjects according to career paths of interest at senior level.

Core Subjects

Learners will be required to take the 12 core subjects provided.

1. English

2. Kiswahili or Kenyan Sign Language for learners who are deaf

3. Mathematics

4. Integrated Science

5. Health Education

6. Pre-Technical and Pre-Career Education

7. Social Studies

8. Religious Education – learners choose one of the following:

i. Christian Religious Education

ii. Islamic Religious Education

iii. Hindu Religious Education

9. Business Studies

10. Agriculture

11. Life Skills Education

12. Sports and Physical Education

Optional Subjects

Learners are provided with an opportunity to choose a minimum of one and a maximum of two subjects according to personality, abilities, interests and career choices from the list provided.

1. Visual Arts

2. Performing Arts

3. Home Science

4. Computer Science

5. Foreign Languages:

i. German

ii. French

iii. Mandarin

iv. Arabic

6. Kenyan Sign Language

7. Indigenous Languages

==== Senior school Education ====
Senior School will consist of three years of education targeted at learners in the age bracket of 15 to 17 years and lays the foundation for further education and training at the tertiary level and the world of work. It will marks the end of Basic Education as defined in the Education Act, 2013.

Learners exiting this level are expected to be “empowered, engaged and ethical citizens” ready to participate in the socio-economic development of the nation.

The learner entering this level shall have had opportunities at lower secondary to explore their own potential, interests and personality and is therefore ready to begin specialization in a career path of choice. The specialization entails choosing to pursue studies in one of the three pathways available in senior school. He or she can choose the Arts and Sports Science, Social Sciences or Science Technical Engineering and Mathematics (STEM) pathway.

Schools will be specialized institutions that will provide opportunities for learners to focus in a field of their choice as well as form a foundation for further education and training and gaining employable skills. Senior schools will be required to therefore organize open days to enable learners and parents to glean the information necessary for effective decision- making. Additionally, a robust parental empowerment and engagement programme will be necessary to strengthen the involvement of parents in this process.

The new system will also include an expanded curriculum for Learners with Special Educational Needs. Learners with special educational needs who may follow the regular curriculum may include those with:

- Visual Impairment
- Hearing Impairment
- Physical Handicap
- Mild Cerebral Palsy
- Learning Disabilities
- Autism
- Emotional and Behavioral Difficulties
- Communication Disorders and the
- Gifted and Talented

Learners with Special Needs Who May Not have their needs met from just following the Regular Curriculum

Learners with special needs who may not have their needs met from just following the regular curriculum may include those with:

- Mental Handicap
- Deaf blindness
- Severe Autism
- Severe Cerebral Palsy
- Multiple Handicaps
- Profound Disabilities.

=== The End of 8-4-4 Educational System ===
In the 21st century, transitions in the way of life in Kenya has proved that the educational system has reached its end and can no longer be used to meet the demands of the country. The country is moving towards an inclusive and more innovative direction. The expansion is purposed to increase performance that will be compared at a national level.

== See also ==
- Development of Education System in Kenya since IndependenceTamara Daisy Ochieng kisomu junior Academy 5 Michigan.
