= List of energy regulatory bodies =

This is a list of energy regulating bodies that administer energy law in their respective jurisdictions.

== Africa ==
- Botswana: Botswana Energy Regulatory Authority (BERA) is the energy regulator and a government parastatal of the Botswana government.
- Egypt: Egyptian Electric Utility and Consumer Protection Regulatory Agency
- Malawi: Malawi Energy Regulatory Authority (MERA)
- Kenya: Energy and Petroleum Regulatory Authority (EPRA)
- South Africa: National Energy Regulator (NERSA)
- Zimbabwe: Zimbabwe Energy Regulatory Authority (ZERA)

== Americas ==
- Barbados: Fair Trading Commission (FTC) is the national government body regulate electricity utility service and rates.
- Canada: The Canada Energy Regulator (CER) is the government agency empowered to regulate inter-provincial/territorial aspects of oil, gas and electric utilities, while nuclear power is regulated by the Canadian Nuclear Safety Commission (CNSC).
- United States: Federal Energy Regulatory Commission (FERC) has jurisdiction over interstate electricity sales, wholesale electric rates, hydroelectric licensing, natural gas and oil pipeline transportation rates, while the Nuclear Regulatory Commission (NRC) regulates nuclear energy.

== Asia ==
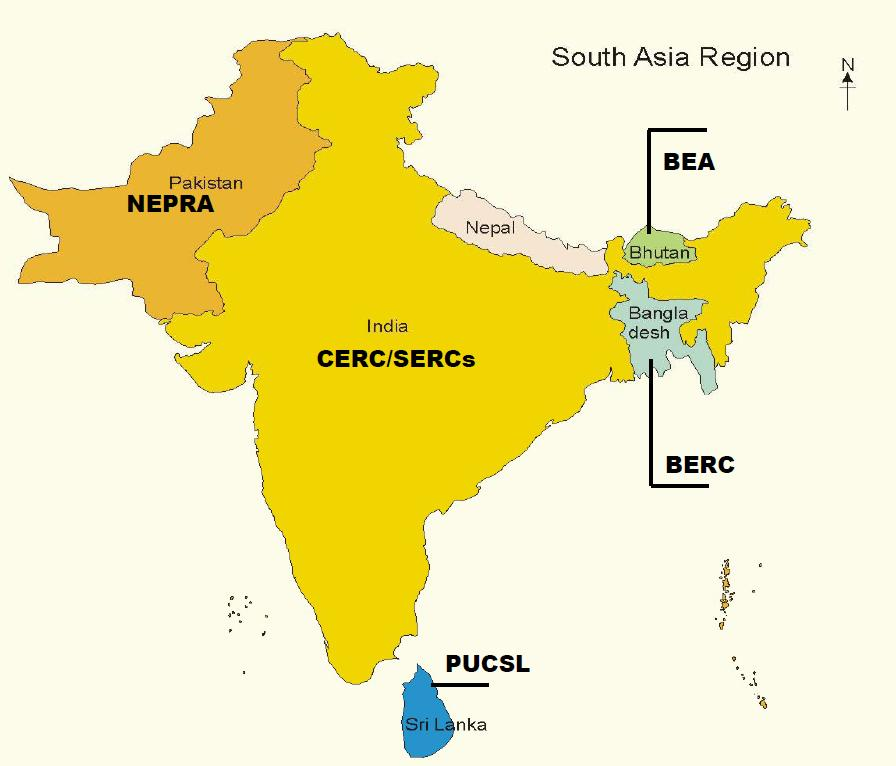
Electric utility regulators in South Asia

- Bangladesh: Bangladesh Energy Regulatory Commission (BERC) was established on March 13, 2003, through a legislative Act of the Government of Bangladesh to regulate gas, electricity and petroleum products for the whole of Bangladesh.
- Bhutan: Bhutan Electricity Authority (BEA) was established as a functional autonomous agency under Electricity Act of Bhutan, 2001. BEA was granted full autonomy by the Royal Government of Bhutan to regulate the electricity supply industry of Bhutan.
- India: Central Electricity Regulatory Commission (CERC) is the autonomous regulator for electric power utilities in India, excluding nuclear power which comes under the jurisdiction of the Atomic Energy Regulatory Board (AERB)
- Malaysia: The Energy Commission of Malaysia (Suruhanjaya Tenaga) was instituted under the Energy Commission Act 2001, is the regulator of the Malaysian electricity and gas supply industry.
- Nepal: Electricity Regulatory Commission (ERC) is an independent regulatory body for electricity sector in Nepal established pursuant to Electricity Regulatory Commission Act, 2017 and Electricity Regulatory Commission Regulations, 2018. It came into operation on May 8, 2019. ERC is responsible for setting generation tariff for electricity generation licensees, consumer electricity tariff of distribution licensees, determining transmission and wheeling charge of transmission licensees as well as taking steps to promote competition in electricity sector in Nepal and protecting rights of electricity consumers.
- Oman: Authority for Electricity Regulation (AER) of Oman was established by Article (19) of the law for the regulation and privatization of the electricity and related water sector. The Sector Law was promulgated by Royal Decree 78/2004 on 1 August 2004.
- Pakistan: Oil & Gas Regulatory Authority (OGRA) is the primary Oil & Gas Regulator Established under the OGRA Ordinance, 2002 for regulating the midstream and downstream Oil & Gas Sector in the country for regulated activities pertaining to issuance of Licences, Revenue Requirements and Tariff Determination for Oil & Gas molecules sold by the licencees. National Electric Power Regulatory Authority (NEPRA) is the electricity regulator of Pakistan established under the Electric Power Act, 1997 for tariff determination, issuance of license & system operation of generation, transmission and distribution of electric power in Pakistan, excluding nuclear power, which comes under the jurisdiction of the Pakistan Nuclear Regulatory Authority (PNRA).
- People's Republic of China: State Electricity Regulatory Commission (SERC) of the People's Republic of China is empowered by the State Council to perform administrative and regulatory duties with respect to the China's power sector, excluding nuclear power, which comes under the jurisdiction of the China Atomic Energy Authority (CAEA).
- Philippines: Energy Regulatory Commission (ERC) is an independent, quasi-judicial regulatory body established to regulate electric power service in the Philippines.
- Singapore: Energy Market Authority (EMA) is a statutory board operating under the Ministry of Trade and Industry of Singapore established for energy sector market regulation, system operation, industry development and promotion of Singapore.
- Sri Lanka: Public Utilities Commission of Sri Lanka (PUCSL) was established by the Act No 35 of 2002. Initially the PUCSL Act provided for regulation of the electricity and water service industries. In March 2006 the petroleum industry was also added to the list of industries to be regulated by the PUCSL.
- Thailand: Energy Regulatory Commission (ERC) of Thailand is appointed by His Majesty King Bhumibol Adulyadej as the independent regulatory agency. The foundation of all functions and responsibilities follows the enactment of the ENERGY INDUSTRY ACT B.E. 2550 (2007).

== Energy Regulators Regional Association ==
The Energy Regulators Regional Association (ERRA) is a voluntary organization of independent energy regulatory bodies primarily from the Central European and Eurasian region, with Affiliates from Asia the Middle East and the US. ERRA began as a cooperative exchange among 12 energy regulatory bodies to improve national energy regulation in member countries.

1. Albania: Energy Regulatory Authority
2. Armenia: Public Services Regulatory Commission of Armenia
3. Azerbaijan: Tariff (Price) Council of the Republic of Azerbaijan and Azerbaijan Energy Regulatory Agency (since 2018)
4. Bosnia and Herzegovina: State Electricity Regulatory Commission
5. Bulgaria: State Energy and Water Regulatory Commission
6. Croatia: Croatian Energy Regulatory Agency
7. Egypt: Egyptian Electric Utility&Consumer Protection Regulatory Agency
8. Estonia: Energy Regulatory Division of the Estonian Competition Authority
9. Georgia: Georgian National Energy and Water Supply Regulatory Commission
10. Hungary: Hungarian Energy Office
11. Kazakhstan: Agency of the Republic of Kazakhstan for Regulation of Natural Monopolies
12. Kyrgyz Republic: State Department of Fuel & Energy Regulation, Energy and Fuel Resources of Kyrgyz Republic
13. Latvia: Public Utilities Commission
14. Lithuania: National Control Commission for Prices and Energy in Lithuania
15. Macedonia: Energy Regulatory Commission of the Republic of Macedonia
16. Moldova: National Energy Regulatory Agency
17. Mongolia: Energy Regulatory Authority
18. Montenegro: Energy Regulatory Agency of the Republic Montenegro
19. Poland: Energy Regulatory Office
20. Romania: Romanian Energy Regulatory Authority
21. Russian Federation: Federal Tariff Service
22. Serbia: Energy Agency of the Republic of Serbia
23. Slovakia: Regulatory Office for Network Industries
24. Turkey: Energy Market Regulatory Authority
25. Ukraine: National Electricity Regulatory Commission of Ukraine

Associated members:

1. Romania: National Regulatory Authority for Municipal Services (Associate Members)
2. UNMIK: Energy Regulatory Office of UNMIK Kosovo (Associate Members)
3. Jordan: Electricity Regulatory Commission (Affiliated Members)
4. Nigeria: Nigerian Electricity Regulatory Commission (Affiliated Members)
5. Saudi Arabia: Water and Electricity Regulatory Authority - WERA (Affiliated Members)
6. United Arab Emirates: Regulation and Supervision Bureau of United Arab Emirates (Affiliated Members)
7. US: National Association of Regulatory Utility Commissioners - NARUC (Affiliated Members)

== Council of European Energy Regulators ==
The Council of European Energy Regulators (CEER) is a not-for-profit organisation in which Europe's national regulators of electricity and gas voluntarily cooperate to protect consumers' interests and to facilitate the creation of a single, competitive and sustainable internal market for gas and electricity in Europe.

CEER currently has 29 members - the national energy regulators from the 27 EU-Member States, plus Iceland and Norway.

== ASEAN Energy Regulators' Network (AERN) ==
The first formal meeting on 3 March 2012 in Bangkok, Thailand, formally established the ASEAN Energy Regulators' Network (AERN) among the ASEAN energy regulators. The objective of AERN is to forge closer cooperation among ASEAN Energy Regulators with a view to promoting sustainability and economic development of the region in support of the vision of the ASEAN Economic Community 2015.

== Energy Regulators Association of East Africa ==
The Energy Regulators Association of East Africa (EREA) is a non-profit organisation mandated to spearhead harmonisation of energy regulatory frameworks, sustainable capacity building and information sharing among the regulators in the East African Community. The key objective is to promote the independence of national regulators and support the establishment of a robust East African energy union. EREA currently has 9 members-the national energy regulators from the 5 East African Community member States.

1. Kenya: Energy and Petroleum Regulatory Authority
2. Tanzania: Energy and Water Utilities Regulatory Authority
3. Zanzibar: Zanzibar Utilities Regulatory Authority
4. Uganda:Electricity Regulatory Authority
5. Uganda: Petroleum Authority of Uganda
6. Rwanda: Rwanda Utilities Regulatory Authority
7. Burundi: Autorité de Régulation des secteurs de l’Eau potable et de l’Energie / Authority for Regulation of Water and Energy Sectors
8. Tanzania: Petroleum Upstream Regulatory Authority
9. Democratic Republic of the Congo: L’Autorité de Régulation du secteur de l’Electricité

== See also ==
- Energy law
