= Regional Association of Energy Regulators for Eastern and Southern Africa =

Intergovernmental institution in Africa dedicated to energy cooperation

- Regional Association of Energy Regulators for Eastern and Southern Africa (Zambia)
- Abbreviation: RAERESA
- Formation: 2009
- Legal status: Intergovernmental Institution
- Location: COMESA Centre, Ben Bell Road, Lusaka – ZAMBIA
- Region served: Common Market for Eastern and Southern Africa
- Members: 16 full members and 5 associate members
- Chief Executive Officer: Geoffrey Aori Mabea
- Main organ: The Plenary and Executive Committee
- Affiliations: COMESA, 21 member states
- Website: raeresa.org

The Regional Association of Energy Regulators for Eastern and Southern Africa (RAERESA) is a specialized agency of the Common Market for Eastern and Southern Africa. It was established to promote regional integration and investment in the energy sector by harmonizing regulatory frameworks among member states. The organization operates under the legal framework of the COMESA Treaty, particularly Articles 106 to 109, which mandate cooperation in energy development and regulation.

== Foundation and mission ==
RAERESA was officially launched on March 16, 2009, after the signing of its Constitution by seven founding national energy regulators: Egypt, Ethiopia, Kenya, Madagascar, Malawi, Rwanda, and Sudan. The organization was created to address regional disparities in energy regulation and encourage the development of a sustainable and competitive energy market in the region.

== Objectives and functions ==
RAERESA’s primary objectives include:

- Harmonizing energy policies, legislation, and regulations across member states.
- Facilitating capacity-building programs for regulators and stakeholders.
- Promoting cooperation in energy trade and investment within the region, especially power pools.
- Encouraging the development and adoption of renewable energy sources.

== Structure ==
The governance structure of RAERESA consists of:

The Plenary: The highest decision-making body comprising representatives from member states.

The Executive Committee: Responsible for overseeing the implementation of strategic initiatives.

Portfolio Committees: Focused on specific areas such as legal harmonization and capacity building.

The Secretariat: Led by the Chief Executive Officer, it handles daily operations and coordination.

== Members and Governance ==
As of 2022, RAERESA includes 16 full members and 5 associate members. Full members are energy regulatory authorities from countries including Egypt, Kenya, Uganda, and Zambia, among others. Associate members include Comoros, Eritrea, and Tunisia.

=== Full Members of RAERESA ===
Full Members of RAERESA
Country	Regulatory Authority	CEO/Director General	Website
Burundi	Authority of Regulation of Water and Energy Sectors (AREEN)	Gabriel Hakizimana	areen.bi
Egypt	Egyptian Electric Utility and Consumer Protection Regulatory Agency (EgyptERA)	Ali Mohamed Abdelfattah	egyptera.org
Ethiopia	Energy Regulatory Authority	Destaw Mequanint	ethioenergyauthority.gov.et
Kenya	Energy and Petroleum Regulatory Authority (EPRA)	Joseph OketchChairperson	epra.go.ke
Madagascar	Electricity Regulation Office (ORE)	Rasolojaona Rivoharilala	ore.mg
Malawi	Malawi Energy Regulatory Authority (MERA)	Henry Kachaje	meramalawi.mw
Mauritius	Utility Regulatory Authority (URA)	Yohane Mukabe	uramauritius.mu
Rwanda	Rwanda Utilities Regulatory Authority (RURA)	Rugigana Evariste	rura.rw
Seychelles	Seychelles Energy Commission (SEC)	Bernice Charles	sec.sc
Sudan	Electricity Regulatory Authority (ERA)	Abdulrahman Haggag Adam Abumusa	era.gov.sd
Uganda	Electricity Regulatory Authority (ERA)	Ziria Tibalwa Waako	era.go.ug
Zambia	Energy Regulation Board (ERB)	Elijah Sichone	erb.org.zm</
Zimbabwe	Zimbabwe Energy Regulatory Authority (ZERA)	Eddington Mazambani	zera.co.zw
Democratic Republic of Congo	Autorité de Régulation du secteur de l'Electricité (ARE)	Soraya Aziz Souleymane Moto	are.gouv.cd
Djibouti	Autorité de Régulation Multisectorielle de Djibouti (ARMD)	Abdi Elmi Achkir	armd.dj

=== Associate Members of RAERESA ===
Associate Members of RAERESA
Country	Ministry	Website
Djibouti	Ministry of Energy in charge of Natural Resources	energie.dj
Eritrea	Ministry of Energy and Mines	shabait.com
Somalia	Ministry of Energy and Water Resources	moewr.gov.so
Tunisia	Ministry of Industry, Energy and Mines	industrie.gov.tn

== Activities ==
RAERESA undertakes various initiatives to strengthen regional energy cooperation. Its key activities include:

- Providing technical support and training for member states.
- Advocating for environmental sustainability and energy efficiency.
- Promoting the use of renewable energy technologies.
- Implementing the Enhancement of a Sustainable Regional Energy Market in Eastern and Southern Africa (ESREM) project under the European Development Fund.

== International Cooperation ==
RAERESA collaborates with international organizations such as the International Confederation of Energy Regulators (ICER) and to share best practices and improve energy regulation globally. In 2022, a delegation of 13 officials from the organization visited the Norwegian Water Resources and Energy Directorate (NVE), to learn about development of power in Norway, and Norway's energy law.

== Funding ==
The association receives financial support from development partners, including the African Development Bank. In 2022, the AfDB provided a $1.5 million grant to enhance the harmonization of electricity regulations and facilitate cross-border power trading within the COMESA region.

== See also ==
- Common Market for Eastern and Southern Africa (COMESA-RAERESA)
- Energy Regulators Regional Association (ERRA)
- Eastern Africa Power Pool (EAPP-IRB)
- Energy law
- Energy Regulators Association of East Africa (EREA)
- Energy Regulation Centre of Excellence (ERCE)
