= Daniel Kiptoo Bargoria =

Kenyan lawyer and energy practitioner (born 1984)

Director General of the Energy and Petroleum Regulatory Authority
- In office 30th June 2021 – 3rd April 2026
- Preceded by: Pavel Oimeke
- Succeeded by: Joseph Oketch (Acting)

Personal details
- Born: Daniel Kiptoo Bargoria; 17 February 1984 (age 42) Kenya
- Education: University of Nairobi, LL.B; University of Dundee, LL.M; University of Cumbria, MBA
- Profession: Energy practitioner
- Website: https://www.epra.go.ke/

Daniel Kiptoo Bargoria (born 17 February 1984) is a Kenyan lawyer and an energy practitioner who served as Director General of the Energy and Petroleum Regulatory Authority (EPRA) from June 2021 until his resignation in April 2026.

== Early life and education ==
Bargoria was born on 17 February 1984 in Nairobi. He did his primary and secondary education in the same city at the then Nairobi Primary School and Mang'u High School respectively. Bargoria holds a Bachelor of Laws (LL.B) from the University of Nairobi, Master of Laws (LLM) specialising in Petroleum Law and Policy from the University of Dundee, and Master of Business Administration from the University of Cumbria. He has completed several executive courses such as Executive Certificate in Public Policy, Infrastructure in a Market Economy and Strategic Management of Regulatory and Enforcement Agencies from the Harvard Kennedy School.

== Career ==
Bargoria became the acting director general of the Energy and Petroleum Regulatory Authority before assuming the office as a substantive director general.

Prior to this, he worked as the Chairman of the Government's First Oil Committee, which was responsible for delivering Kenya's First Oil, and as a legal advisor at the Ministry of Energy and State Department of Petroleum. He also served a recognisable position in the drafting of the Energy Act, 2019 and Petroleum Act, 2019. One of the key achievements during his tenure has been the successful implementation of the fuel marking program. The program aimed at curbing fuel adulteration and to enhance revenue collection.

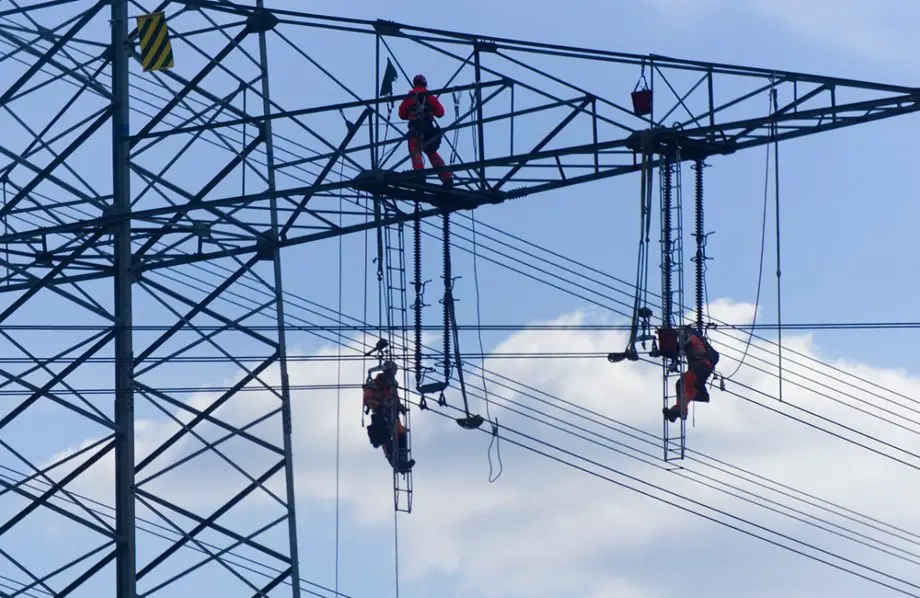
Construction of Olkaria-Narok line in 2021

His administration by the ending of 2022 saw to the commissioning of the 500kV Sodo–Moyale–Suswa High Voltage Power Line (HVDC) transmission line providing an additional 200 MW to the national grid. Other transmission projects commissioned during the period include the Olkaria – Narok 132kV line and 220/66kV Athi-River substation.

Another significant highlight includes the commissioning of the 40 MW Alten solar photovoltaic plant. The plant increased the utility scale installed Solar PV capacity from 170 MW to 210 MW. On January 5, 2023, he spearheaded 4.5 million litres of fuel products landing at Entebbe, Uganda ending about five years of waiting since the Kenya Pipeline Company (KPC) owned facility was completed in 2018.

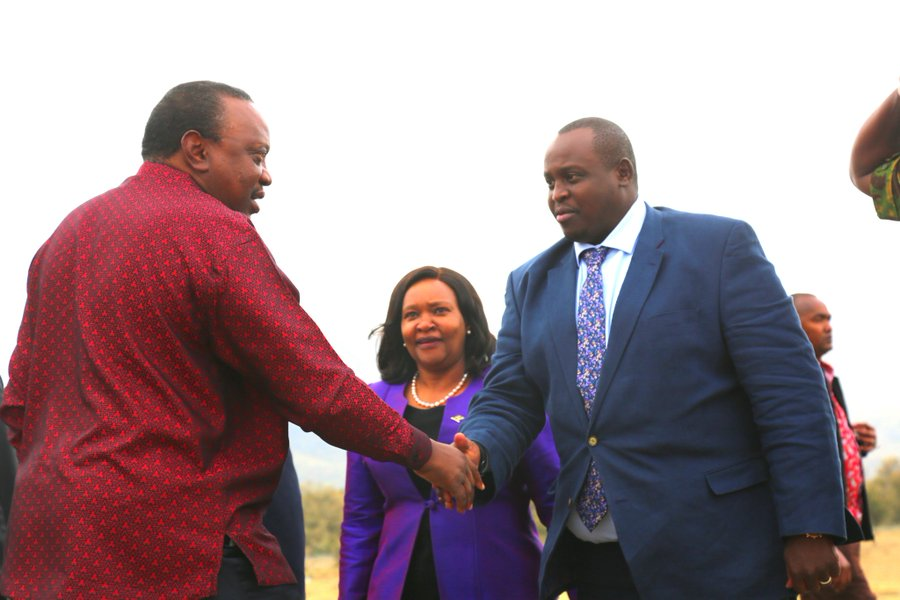
Kiptoo with Uhuru Kenyatta during commissioning of the 86MW Olkaria I Additional Unit (AU) in 2022

He has been instrumental in supporting the connection 8.6 million households to electricity in Kenya. Kiptoo is a qualified lawyer with experience in the Energy and Petroleum sectors with a specific focus in policy formulation, regulation and project & structured financing. Kiptoo is Certified Public Secretary in Kenya (CPS), Chartered Secretary of the Chartered Governance Institute and a member of the Association of International Petroleum Negotiators (AIPN).

=== Fuel subsidy suspension in Kenya ===
Kiptoo was among the technocrats behind the saving of Kenya country's saving of Sh9.4 billion from scrapped fuel subsidy. However, the country experienced a surge in fuel prices leading to unprecedented increase in the cost of transport in general. He was instrumental in designing the Gulf fuel import deal which aimed temporarily replacing the Open Tender System (OTS) system of fuel procurement with bid to strengthen Kenyan shilling that is weakened by the dollar.

== Rugby career ==
Kiptoo was a professional rugby player, who has led an amazing career for club and country during his thirteen-year playing career, winning the Kenya Cup with Kenya Harlequin in 2003, 2008,2010,2011 and 2012, three Enterprise Cups in 2003, 2009 and 2011. He has also won the Bamburi Rugby Super Series in 2003, 2007, 2009, 2010, 2011 and 2012 with the Rhinos. Daniel was part of the Kenya 15s rugby team under coach Michael Otieno. He also was a permanent fixture for the Simbas between 2003 and 2013, winning the Africa Cup in 2011, six Elgon Cups in 2004, 2007, 2008, 2009, 2010 and 2011 as well the 2010 Victoria Cup.

=== International tries ===
Try	Opposing team	Location	Venue	Competition	Date	Result	Score
1	Brazil	Dubai	Dubai Exiles 2	2011 Cup of Nations	10 December 2011	won	27-25
1	Zimbabwe	Zimbabwe	Harare Sports Club	2011 Victoria Cup	25 June 2011	lost	24-42

He has also played several international matches including the famous Kenya versus Brazil on 11 December 2011 in which Kenya Won.

== Awards ==
On 8 July 2022, Kiptoo was awarded the coveted Order of the Grand Warrior (OGW) for his outstanding contribution in the energy sector in Kenya. The State commendation awards are given by the head of States during special occasions and to individuals who have done beyond expectations in leaving a lasting image on their fellow countrymen.

== Other considerations ==
Bargoria is a member of the Executive Council of the Energy Regulators Association of East Africa and the current Chairperson of the Regional Association of Energy Regulators for Eastern and Southern Africa (RAERESA)- a specialised institution of Common Market for Eastern and Southern Africa (COMESA). He is also one of the Steering Committee Members of the International Confederation of Energy Regulators (ICER)-a voluntary framework for cooperation between energy regulators from around the globe, African Forum for Utility Regulators (AFUR) and the Regulatory Energy Transition Accelerator (RETA). Recently, he also joined the Independent Regulatory Board (IRB)-a specialised institution of the Common Market for Eastern and Southern Africa (COMESA) that regulates the Eastern Africa Power Pool (EAPP).

Preceded by Pavel Oimeke	List of Director Generals of the Energy and Petroleum Regulatory Authority; 30 June 2021–present	Incumbent
