= Energy Regulators Association of East Africa =

Non-profit organisation

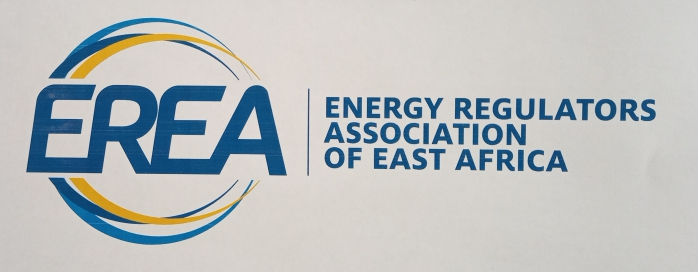
- Abbreviation: EREA
- Formation: 2008
- Legal status: Not for profit organisation
- Purpose: Energy market regulation in East Africa
- Location: 8th Floor, NSSF Mafao House, Old Moshi Road, P.O. Box 1669, Arusha, Tanzania
- Region served: East African Community
- Members: 10 national energy regulatory authorities
- Executive Secretary: Askwar Hamanjida Hilonga
- Main organ: General Assembly and Executive Council
- Affiliations: EAC, East African Community
- Website: EREA

The Energy Regulators Association of East Africa (EREA) is a non-profit organisation mandated to spearhead harmonisation of energy regulatory frameworks, sustainable capacity building and information sharing among the List of energy regulatory bodies in the East African Community. Its key objective is to promote the independence of national regulators and support the establishment of a robust East African energy union.

== Foundation and mission ==
On 28 May 2008, four national energy regulatory authorities voluntarily signed a "Memorandum of Understanding" for the establishment of the Energy Regulators Association of East Africa (EREA). Subsequently, it was recognized by the 8th Sectoral Council on Energy of East African Community (EAC) as a forum of energy regulators in the EAC on 21 June 2013. It was registered by the United Republic of Tanzania on 23 May 2019 into a company limited by guarantees and without share capital under the Companies Act, 2002, and the Memorandum of Association. The EREA represents seven members – the national energy regulators from the EAC Member States.

The EREA works closely with the EAC, African Union Eastern Africa Power Pool (EAPP)-Independent Regulatory Board (IRB), National Association of Regulatory Utility Commissioners and The Regional Association of Energy Regulators for Eastern and Southern Africa (RAERESA). EREA's seat is in Arusha, Tanzania.

== Objectives and functions ==
EREA is composed of nine Key Result Areas and the objectives are summarised as follows:

- Facilitating the harmonization of NRI’s policies, tariff structures and legislation in the Member States;
- Sustainable Capacity Building through the establishment of the Energy Regulation Centre of Excellence (ERCE) to support regional member institutions
- contribute to the advancement of research on regulatory issues
- Promoting regional co-operation in the planning and development of an integrated energy market and infrastructure.
- Promoting independent regulation in the East African Community.

EREA was established to also, amongst other objectives; strengthen economic, commercial, social, cultural, political, technological and other ties for fast balanced and sustainable development within the East African region.

== Members and Governance ==
EREA members include Energy and Water Utilities Regulatory Authority (EWURA) of Tanzania, Energy Petroleum Regulatory Authority (EPRA) of Kenya, Zanzibar Utility Regulatory Authority (ZURA) of Zanzibar, and Petroleum Authority of Uganda (PAU) of Uganda. Others include Electricity Regulatory Authority (ERA) of Uganda, Rwanda Utilities Regulatory Authority (RURA) of Rwanda and Autorité de Régulation des secteurs de l’Eau potable et de l’Energie (AREEN) of Burundi. EREA is also supporting the Government of the Republic of South Sudan to establish an independent regulatory authority which will eventually be integrated within the regional regulatory association. The Association has four organs and applies the principle of rotating leadership of the organs among its members. These organs are: (a) The General Assembly (G.A.) – the supreme organ, is currently chaired by AREEN-Burundi. The GA is the meeting of chairpersons and chief executive officers of the national regulatory authorities in EAC. (b) The Executive Council – is currently chaired by EWURA-Tanzania. This a meeting of Chief Executive Officers/Director Generals of the national regulatory authorities in EAC. (c) The Secretariat - is headed by the Executive Secretary-Dr. Geoffrey Aori Mabea, appointed for a three-year term, and the position is on a rotational basis among the countries of East African Community. (d) Three Specialized Portfolio Committees for handling Economic, Legal, and Technical matters of the Association.

Country	Authority	Short Name	Director General
Kenya	Energy and Petroleum Regulatory Authority	EPRA	Daniel Kiptoo Bargoria
Tanzania	Energy and Water Utilities Regulatory Authority	EWURA	James Andilile
Zanzibar	Zanzibar Utilities Regulatory Authority	ZURA	Omar Ali Yusuf
Uganda	Electricity Regulatory Authority	ERA	Ziria Tibalwa Waako
Uganda	Petroleum Authority of Uganda	PAU	Ernest Rubondo
Rwanda	Rwanda Utilities Regulatory Authority	RURA	Rugigana Evariste
Burundi	Autorité de Régulation des secteurs de l’Eau potable et de l’Energie (Authority for Regulation of Water and Energy Sectors)	AREEN	Gabriel Hakizamana
Tanzania	Petroleum Upstream Regulatory Authority	PURA	Charles Sangweni
Democratic Republic of the Congo	Autorité de Régulation du secteur de l'Electricité	ARE	Ngalula Mubenga
Somalia	National Electricity Authority	NEA	Maareye Abdullahi

== EAC Electricity Markets ==
=== The East African Community's Electricity Regulatory Index(ERI) ===
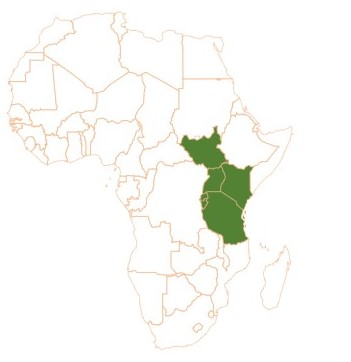
The Energy Regulators Association of East Africa members are drawn from the East African Community member states; Kenya, Tanzania, Rwanda, South Sudan, Uganda and Burundi.

The African Development Bank carried out a third electricity regulatory index for Africa to assess the three main pillars of regulation. They included: the Regulatory Governance Index (RGI); the Regulatory Substance Index (RSI); and the Regulatory Outcome Index (ROI). In the report, the East African Community members states shows a significant improvement in the key regulatory index. According to the African Development Bank, Uganda has maintained the top position for two consecutive years.

No.	Country	2020-ERI
1.	Burundi	0.434
2.	Kenya	0.633
3.	Rwanda	0.580
4.	South Sudan	-
5.	Tanzania	0.721
6.	Uganda	0.801

=== End User Electricity Tariff ===
EAC Electricity Tariff
Category	Kenya	Rwanda	Tanzania	Uganda	Burundi
Domestic Lifeline	12.7	9.9	4.38	6.7	4.7
	US¢/kWh	US¢/kWh	US¢/kWh	US¢/kWh	US¢/kWh
Domestic Other	18.7	20.3	15.33	20.0	23.8
Small Commercial	18.5	21.4	12.79	17.7	17.3
Medium Industries	14.0	10.9	6.66	9.7	12.4
Large Industries	-	-	-	8.1	-
Street Lighting	10.2	20.6	12.79	9.9	N/A

=== Electricity Statistics for EAC ===
EAC Demand And Supply (Saidi & Saifi, Losses, Connectivity Rate)
Performance indicator (Parameter)	Kenya	Rwanda	Tanzania	Uganda	Burundi
Installed capacity(MW)	2819	207.5	1732.2	1254.2	72.75
Electricity access rate (%)	79.31	53	67.5	50	6
System load factor (%)	69.56	56	72.92	70	56.1
System losses (%) (annually). Transmission and distribution	24.02	19	14.72	19	20
Number of connected customers in Millions	7.263	0.95	2.23	1.5	0.12
Consumption per capita (kWh/year)	155.4	55.64	138.55	101.18	23

== See also ==
- Common Market for Eastern and Southern Africa (COMESA)
- Energy Regulators Regional Association (ERRA)
- Eastern Africa Power Pool (EAPP-IRB)
- Energy Regulation Centre of Excellence (ERCE)
- Regional Association of Energy Regulators for Eastern and Southern Africa RAERESA
