= Mabea =

Mabea may refer to:

- Mabea (plant) a genus of the spurge family (Euphorbiaceae) of flowering plants;
- Mabea ethnic groups of Cameroon
- Geoffrey Aori Mabea, Kenyan economist
- Kouya Mabea (born 1998), Ivorian footballer
