= Erce =

Erce may refer to:

- Ercé, a commune in southwestern France
- Æcerbot, an Anglo-Saxon metrical charm meant to magically heal dormant fields
- Energy Regulation Centre of Excellence
- Erce Kardeşler, a Turkish footballer
