= Victoria Cup =

Victoria Cup may refer to:

== Horse racing ==
- Victoria Cup (harness race), an annual harness horse race in Australia
- Victoria Cup (horse race), a British horse race
- Victoria Cup (Japan), now the Queen Elizabeth II Cup, an annual race for fillies and mares

== Other sports ==
- Victoria Cup (ice hockey), a 2008 and 2009 challenge cup ice hockey match held in Europe
- Victoria Cup (rugby union), an Africa rugby series
