= Zanzibar Utilities Regulatory Authority =

Multisectoral regulator of the Government of Zanzibar

- ZURA
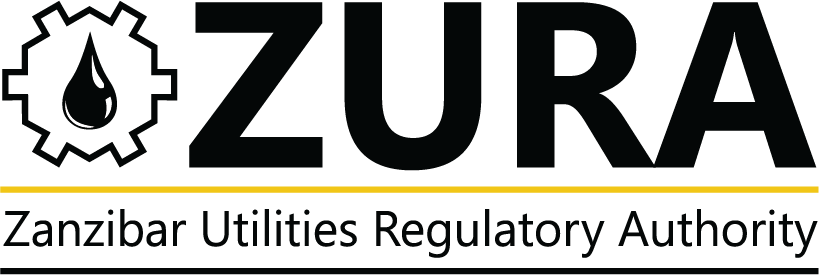

Agency overview
- Formed: 2015
- Jurisdiction: Zanzibar
- Headquarters: ZURA House; Maisara; Zanzibar, Tanzania
- Agency executives: Chairperson, Asha Ali Abdulla; Chief executive officer, Bihindi Nassor Khatib
- Parent agency: Ministry of Energy and Water (Zanzibar)
- Website: www.zanzibar-energy.com

Map
- Zanzibar Utilities Regulatory Authority (Tanzania)

The Zanzibar Utilities Regulatory Authority (ZURA) is a multisectoral government agency established under Act No. 7/2013 of the Laws of Zanzibar to provide technical and economic regulation in both electricity, petroleum and water sectors in Zanzibar, autonomous part of Zanzibar Archipelago, Tanzania, East Africa.

== History ==
Zanzibar Utilities Regulatory Authority was established in 2015 in accordance with Act No. 7/2013 of the Laws of Zanzibar. The agency is governed by the board of directors while the day-to-day affairs are governed by the director general. ZURA regulates the utilities in various islands in Zanzibar. The man two Islands are Pemba Island and Unguja. To provide efficient and reliable services in the islands, a bill to regulate the energy and water sectors was drafted and enacted into law on 19 August 2013, creating a multi-sectoral independent regulatory authority to regulate electricity, petroleum, LPG, and water utility services. The electricity utility's main source of electricity is through a 39-kilometer of 100-megawatt submarine capacity cable originating from the mainland (Dar es Salaam to Ras Fumba) to Unguja. The Unguja highland is served by a 75-kilometre of 25-megawatt subsea capacity cable from the Tanzania mainland. In 2017 ZURA established a program to import petroleum in bulk to the islands.

== Location ==
The foundation for a new headquarters building for ZURA was laid in Maisara, Zanzibar, Tanzania in January 2019. The building opened in June 2020.

== Governance ==
ZURA is composed of seven board of directors including the director general who is an ex officio member. The Minister of Lands, Water, Energy and Environment appoints five members while the director general and the chairperson of the board are presidential appointees. The board of directors is chaired by Asha Ali Abdula, who is also a member of the Energy Regulators Association of East Africa General Assembly. The director general of the authority is Bihindi Nassor Khatib.

== Electricity and water markets ==
The Zanzibar's Island water coverage is 65% at an average of daily service of 12 hours and is managed by the Zanzibar Water Authority. The electricity access rate is 82% and the power supply is managed by the Zanzibar Electricity Corporation. The two utilities are regulated by the Zanzibar Utilities Regulatory Authority and the following electricity and water tariffs are applicable:

=== End User Electricity Tariff ===
Zanzibar Electricity Tariff
Tariff Name	Category	Unit ranges	Price per Kwh	Price perKVA	service charge
			TZs/kWh	TZs/kWh	TZs/kWh
Z0	Life Line	1 to 500	79		2,100
Z0	Life Line	501 to ALL	480		2,100
Z1	General Services	1 to 1,500	266		2,100
Z1	General Services	1,500 to ALL	288		2,100
Z2	Small Industries	1 to ALL	206	16,000	10,500
Z3	Large Industries	1 to ALL	169	16,000	150,500
Z4	Street Lighting	ALL units	266	16,000	150,500

=== End User Water Tariff ===
Zanzibar Water Tariff
Tariff Code	Description	Band	Start Unit	End Unit	Rate
					TZs
P-A2013		1	0.00	50.00	718.80
P-A2013		2	50.00	200.00	872.83
P-A2013		3	200.00	0.00	1026.85
P-C2013		1	0.00	15.00	821.48
P-C2013		2	15.00	30.00	924.17
P-C2013		3	30.00	50.00	1026.85
P-C2013		4	50.00	100.00	1232.22
P-C2013		5	100.00	0.00	1437.60
P-D2013		1	0.00	8.00	667.45
P-D2013	Domestic	2	8.00	12.00	821.48
P-D2013		3	12.00	15.00	1026.85
P-D2013		4	15.00	17.00	1232.22
P-D2013		5	17.00	0.00	1540.28
P-H2013		1	0.00	15.00	1129.54
P-H2013		2	15.00	30.00	1437.60
P-H2013		3	30.00	50.00	1848.34
P-H2013		4	50.00	100.00	3080.56
P-H2013		5	100.00	250.00	4107.42
P-H2013		6	250.00	500.00	5647.70
P-H2013		7	500.00	1000.00	6161.12
P-H2013		8	1000.00	0.00	7167.98
P-I2013		1	0.00	15.00	924.17
P-I2013		2	15.00	30.00	1026.85
P-I2013	Institution	3	30.00	50.00	1129.54
P-I2013		4	50.00	100.00	1232.22
P-I2013		5	100.00	250.00	1437.60
P-I2013		6	250.00	500.00	1642.97
P-I2013		7	500.00	1000.00	1951.02
P-I2013		8	1000.00	0.00	2259.08
P-K2013		1	0.00	0.00	750.00
P-W2013		1	0.00	0.00	750.00

== Auxiliary institutions and allied agencies ==
- Tanzania Electric Supply Company Limited
- Zanzibar Electricity Corporation
- TANESCO

== See also ==
- Energy Regulators Association of East Africa
- 2008 Zanzibar power blackout
