= Energy Regulatory Commission =

Energy Regulatory Commission may refer to:

- Bangladesh Energy Regulatory Commission
- Energy Regulatory Commission (Philippines)
- Energy Regulatory Commission (Thailand)
- Federal Energy Regulatory Commission, United States
