= 2012 Victoria Cup =

India

- Countries: Kenya; Uganda; Zimbabwe
- Tournament format(s): Round-robin
- Matches played: 6

The 2012 Victoria Cup was a cancelled rugby tournament, originally scheduled to be played in June and July 2012 as the third Victoria Cup involving the national teams from Zimbabwe, Kenya and Uganda.

The tournament was cancelled after Uganda withdrew due to financial difficulties, and was not revived until 2019. The only fixtures played in 2012 were the home and away Elgon Cup matches between Kenya and Uganda. All fixtures involving Zimbabwe were cancelled.

== Schedule ==
The original schedule was for home and away fixtures in a double round-robin involving all three teams.

Date	Home	Score	Visitor	Venue	Notes
2012-04-21	Uganda	19–5	Kenya	Kyadondo RFC, Uganda	Elgon Cup opener
2012-04-28	Kenya	12–0	Uganda	RFUEA Grounds, Kenya	Uganda wins Elgon cup 19-17 on agg
2012-07-21	Zimbabwe	cancelled	Uganda	All matches from July onwards cancelled	
2012-07-28	Kenya	cancelled	Zimbabwe	All matches from July onwards cancelled	
2012-08-04	Uganda	cancelled	Zimbabwe	All matches from July onwards cancelled	
2012-08-11	Zimbabwe	cancelled	Kenya	All matches from July onwards cancelled	
