= Geoffrey Aori Mabea =

Kenyan Energy economist

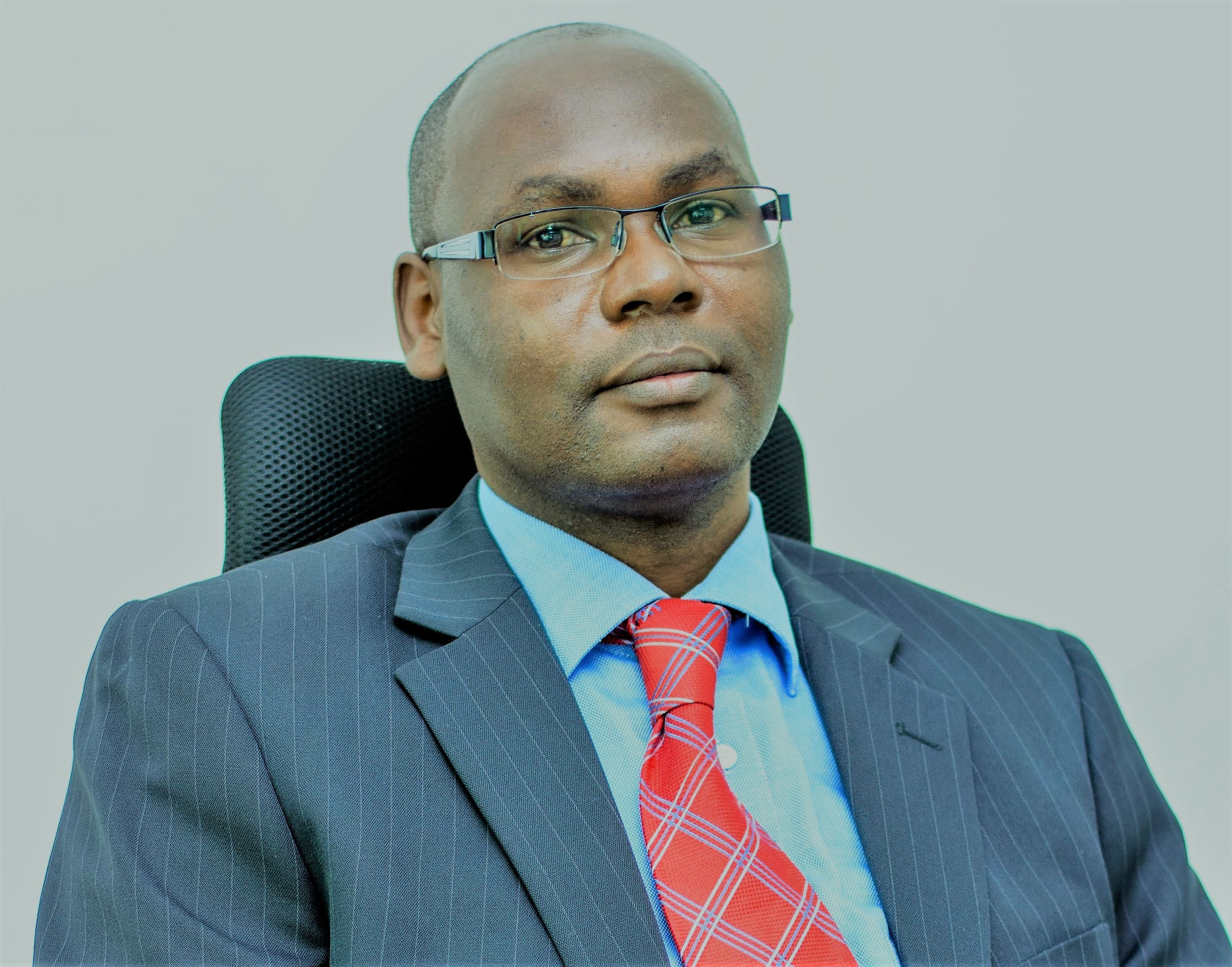
- Mabea in 2021

2nd Chief Executive Officer of the Regional Association of Energy Regulators for Eastern and Southern Africa
- Incumbent
- Assumed office 1 July 2025

Personal details
- Education: Jomo Kenyatta University of Agriculture and Technology; University of Surrey; University of Dundee
- Known for: Energy economics,Diplomat
- Website: raeresa.org

Geoffrey Aori Mabea is an energy economist, professor, and corporate executive and the current Chief Executive Officer of the Regional Association of Energy Regulators for Eastern and Southern Africa. He is the immediate former Executive Secretary of the Energy Regulators Association of East Africa. He Served that position from 2020 as the first Executive Secretary of the regional Organisation with the mandate of spearheading establishment of the East African Community Energy Union. Prior to joining EREA, he was a researcher at the University of Dundee. He also served as a capital projects advisor with PwC.

== Education ==
Mabea holds a bachelor's degree in Geomatics and a Master of Business Administration both obtained from Jomo Kenyatta University of Agriculture and Technology. He also has a Master of Science in energy economics and policy from the University of Surrey on a Chevening Scholarship. Later, he pursued a Doctor of Philosophy degree in Energy economics from the University of Dundee Scotland on a Centre for Energy, Petroleum and Mineral Law and Policy Scholarship.

== Career ==
Mabea started his career as a port surveyor with the Kenya Ports Authority before switching his career into the Energy market. He worked in various senior positions with Kenya Electricity Generating Company in Kenya and Geothermal Development Company. He was appointed to the national committees for energy planning and Feed-in tariff for Kenya between 2010 and 2012. While at Geothermal Development Company, he managed the delivery of over US$400million of Geothermal energy projects at Menengai and Olkaria fields. He was later appointed to the capacity building cluster committee of the Northern Corridor Integration Projects as representative from Geothermal Development Company under the Ministry of Energy, Kenya. In 2014, he joined PriceWaterHouseCoopers first, as capital projects advisor for the East Market and later as a senior consultant.

== Diplomatic career ==
=== Energy Regulators Association of East African Community ===
In 2020, the General Assembly of Energy Regulators Association of East Africa, appointed him as its first Executive Secretary to work closely with the East African Community Secretariat and the national regulatory authorities to achieve the Energy Union. He was instrumental in establishing the East African Community Energy Union and the realisation of the Africa Single Electricity Market and the Eastern Africa Power Pool. He pioneered the development of the Energy Regulation Centre of Excellence (ERCE).

=== Regional Association of Energy Regulators for Eastern and Southern Africa ===
In 2025, Mabea joined the Regional Association of Energy Regulators for Eastern and Southern Africa, an agency of the Common Market for Eastern and Southern Africa as the Chief Executive Officer. He is actively involved in issues relating to regional integration and regional trade. He plays a key role in development and adoption of policies that promotes energy trade deals and Energy diplomacy.

== Books ==
- Primer on Energy Economics and Policy:Electricity, Petroleum and Institutional Realities (2026) ISBN 978-9-91435-720-2.

== Other activities ==
Mabea sits on the Advisory board of Nalule Energy and Mineral Consultants . He was the director general of the Energy Regulation Centre of Excellence(ERCE). He also sits on the advisory board of Quarser Ranges. He is member of the International Association for Energy Economics and Professor at the University of Zambia. His main areas of interest are energy policy harmonisation, energy markets integration, economic welfare, economic governance and sustainable capacity building.

== See also ==
- List of books about the energy industry

Diplomatic posts
Preceded by Mohamedain Seif Elnasr	List of Chief Executive Officer of the Regional Association of Energy Regulators for Eastern and Southern Africa; 01 July 2025–present	Incumbent
