= Energy Regulation Centre of Excellence =

Energy Training Centre

- Abbreviation: ERCE
- Formation: 2022
- Purpose: To offer an opportunity for advancement of learning through teaching, exchange of ideas and experiences and research to fulfil East African Community's potential to transform the energy market
- Location: 8th Floor, NSSF Mafao House, Old Moshi Road, P.O. Box 1669, Arusha, Tanzania
- Region served: East African Community
- Website: ERCE

The Energy Regulation Centre of Excellence (ERCE) is a specialised Eastern African regional institution for energy research and training in energy regulation, electricity market studies, energy law, petroleum studies, transmission network studies, market clearing, energy transition and energy economics.

== History ==
The Centre of Excellence was established in 2022 by the Energy Regulators Association of East Africa (EREA) to provide sustainable capacity building. It was founded by Geoffrey Aori Mabea. The centre currently offers short term courses at the association's secretariat office but, has now officially been allocated land to build the institution in Arusha Tanzania.

== Description ==
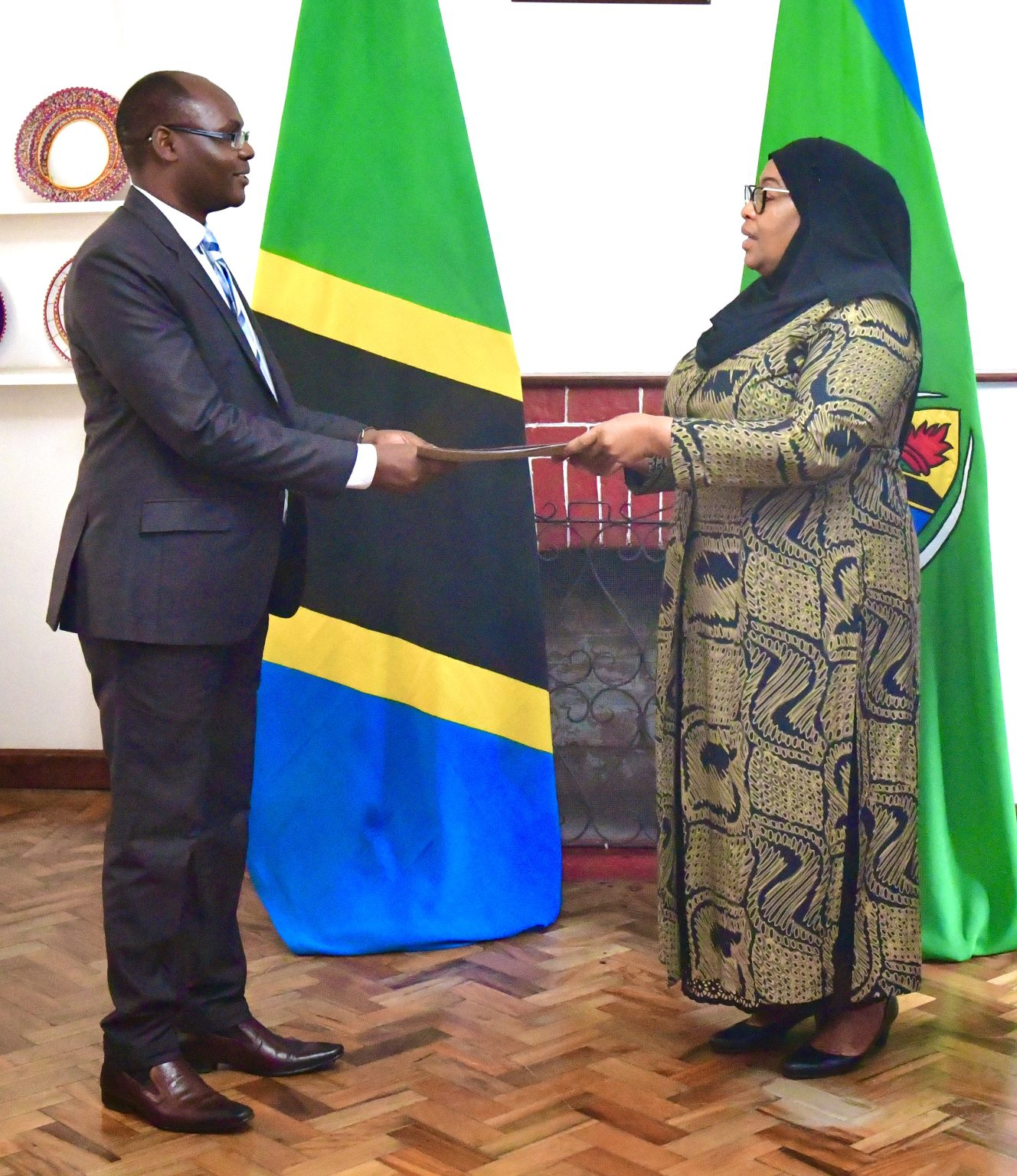
EREA Executive Secretary- Geoffrey Aori Mabea receives land Title deed from President Samia Suluhu Hassan to build Centre of Excellence

The East African Community energy sector has been lagging behind in meeting its energy adequacy, security and efficient supply. The constraints are occasioned by poor infrastructure and robust policies to attract investment in the sector. Also, inadequate skilled workforce is vital in boosting productivity in the Electric power industry and Petroleum industry.

The Centre of Excellence has therefore been established to address these challenges related to Tariff (regulation), reliability, crossborder energy trade and quality of electricity. It provides trainings to policymakers, Eastern Africa Power Pool, Public utility, energy traders, regulators, utility staff, ministries' staff and other stakeholders.

== Strategic objective ==
The centre is established as a research powerhouse to provide student educational experiences for an East African energy union.

== Notable staff ==
Staff included:

- Askwar Hamanjida Hilonga, interim director general
- Ziria Tibalwa Waako, board member
- Ngalula Mubenga, board member
- Ernest Rubondo, board member
- Daniel Kiptoo Bargoria, board member
