= 2011 Victoria Cup =

- Countries: Kenya; Uganda; Zimbabwe
- Tournament format(s): Round-robin
- Matches played: 6

The 2011 Victoria Cup was scheduled to take place in June and July 2011; it will be the second Victoria Cup with the national teams from Zimbabwe, Kenya and Uganda competing in a round robin tournament, with both home and away fixtures. Kenya are the reigning champions after winning all 4 of their matches in 2010.

== Schedule ==
Click on the date in the first column to see more details on that match.

Date	Kickoff	Home	Score	Visitor	Venue	Notes
2011-06-12	EAT	Uganda	15 – 25	Zimbabwe	Kyadondo Ground, Kampala, Uganda	This match doubled as the opening game of both the Victoria Cup and of the Confederation of African Rugby (CAR) Division 1B playoffs
2011-06-25	CAT	Zimbabwe	42 - 24	Kenya	Harare Sports Club, Harare, Zimbabwe	
2011-07-02	CAT	Zimbabwe	49 – 21	Uganda	Hartsfeild, Bulawayo, Zimbabwe	
2011-07-09	EAT	Kenya	27–10	Uganda	RFUEA Ground, Kenya	Doubles as first match of the 2011 Elgon Cup
2011-07-16	EAT	Uganda	32– 18	Kenya	Kyadondo Rugby Ground, Uganda	Doubles as second match of the 2011 Elgon Cup
2011-07-23	EAT	Kenya	21–26	Zimbabwe	Nyayo National sports Stadium, Nairobi, Kenya	

== 2011 Final Table of Standings ==
Team	Played	Won	Drawn	Lost	For	Against	Difference	Points	Bonus	TOTAL
Zimbabwe	4	4	0	0	142	81	+61	16	2	18
Kenya	4	1	0	3	90	110	-20	4	1	5
Uganda	4	1	0	3	78	119	-41	4	0	4

== 2011 points scorers ==
Player		Tries	Conversions	Penalties	Drop-goals	POINTS
	Kenya					0
	Uganda					0
	Zimbabwe					0
TOTAL		0	0	0	0	0

== Match 1 ==
Tangai Nemadire put the Sables 5-0 up eight minutes into the game. Justin Kimono, top try scorer at the recently concluded Bamburi Rugby Super Series restored parity for the home side on thirty minutes. The diminutive Kimono, making his national team debut scored again two minutes later. Tichafara Makwanya's thirty fifth-minute penalty narrowed the deficit to 10-8 just before half-time. Prop forward Denford Mutamangira scored a try on forty eight minutes with Makwanya's conversion putting Zimbabwe 15-10 ahead. Gardner Nechironga scored a try and Makwanya's conversion put Zimbabwe 22-10 ahead on fifty minutes. Makwanya scored a drop goal with an hour gone before Robert Seguya scored a late pushover try for Uganda. Final score 25-15 to Zimbabwe.

Defending champions Kenya played a series of friendlies against the Mpumalanga Pumas from South Africa. Kenya coach Michael Otieno is expected to name his travelling party on Tuesday 21 June to play Zimbabwe in Bulawayo on 25 June.

2011-06-12
EAT (UTC+3)

Uganda	15 – 25	Zimbabwe
Try: Kimono (2); Seguya		Try: Nemadire; Mutamangira; Nechironga; Con: Makwanya (2); Pen: Makwanya; Drop: Makwanya

Team Lists

Player	Club
FB	15
RW	14
OC	13
IC	12
LW	11
FH	10
SH	9
LP	1
HK	2
TP	3
LL	4
RL	5
BF	6
OF	7
N8	8
Substitutes:
16
17
18
19
20
22
Management:
Head Coach:
Asst Coach:
Asst Coach:
Manager:
Physio:

ZIMBABWE (Sables) (Zimbabwe)
Player	Club
FB	15
RW	14
OC	13
IC	12
LW	11
FH	10
SH	9
LP	1
HK	2
TP	3
LL	4
RL	5
BF	6
OF	7
N8	8
Substitutes:
16
17
18
19
20
21
22
Management:
Head Coach:
Asst Coach:
Manager:
Doctor:
Physio:
