= Botswana Energy Regulatory Authority =

- Industry: Electricity
- Founded: 1 September 2017
- Headquarters: Lobatse, Botswana
- Key people: Rose Nunu Seretse (Chief Executive Officer)
- Parent: Government of Botswana
- Website: www.bera.co.bw

Botswana Energy Regulatory Authority (BERA) is the energy regulator and a government parastatal of the Botswana government. The parastatal was founded after the Botswana Energy Regulatory Act was put in place in 2016 and started its operations on the 1st September, 2017.

== See also ==
- List of energy regulatory bodies
- Botswana Power Corporation
- Botswana Railways
- Companies and Intellectual Property Authority
- Energy Regulatory Authority (Albania)
- Electricity distribution companies by country
