= Authority for Regulation of Water and Energy Sectors =

National energy regulatory authority of Burundi

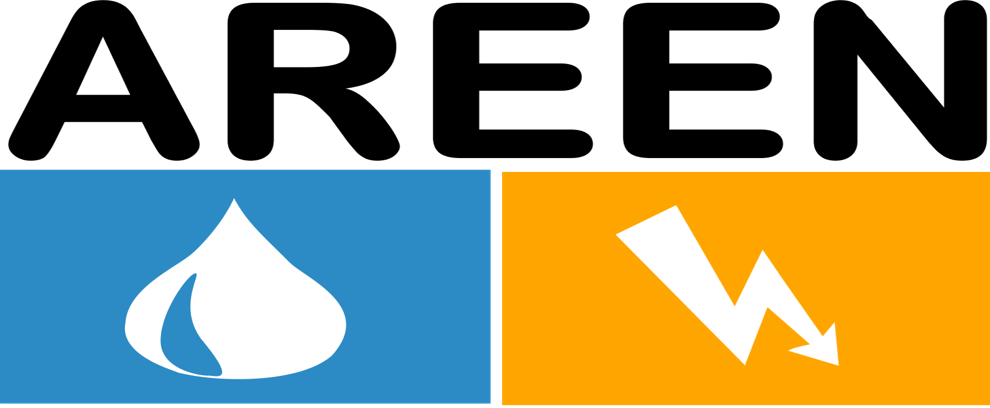

Agency overview
- Formed: 2018
- Jurisdiction: Burundi
- Headquarters: Commune Mukaza, Zone Rohero, Ave. de la JRR House 17, Immeuble le savonnier, Rez-de-chaussee; Bujumbura, Burundi
- Agency executives: Gaëthan NICAYENZI, Chairperson; Balthazar NGANIKIYE, Director general
- Parent agency: Burundi Ministry of Energy and Mines (Burundi)
- Website: Homepage/

Map
- Authority for Regulation of Water and Energy Sectors (Burundi)

The Authority for Regulation of Water and Energy Sectors (French: Autorité de Régulation des secteurs de l'Eau potable et de l’Energie (AREEN)) is an independent regulatory authority of Burundi mandated to provide for technical and economic regulation of electricity and water utilities.

== History ==
The government of Burundi, through the presidential decree number 100/320 of 2011, established a national energy regulator called the Agency for controlling and regulating potable water and electricity sector in the Republic of Burundi (French: de l’Agence de Contrôle et de Régulation du secteur de l’eau potable et de l’électricité en République du Burundi (ACR)) on 22 November 2011. ACR was later renamed the Regulatory Agency for the Drinking Water, Electricity and Mining Sectors (French: de l’Agence de Régulation des secteurs de l’Eau potable, de l’Electricité et des Mines (AREEM)) on 11 December 2015 with an expanded mandate of regulating the mining sectors. Later, the government of Burundi adopted the Authority for Regulation of Water and Energy Sectors through a Presidencial Decree No. 100/159 of 2018 with a narrowed mandate to regulate water and energy sectors.

== Location ==
The offices of the Authority for Regulation of Water and Energy Sectors are located at the, Commune Mukaza, Zone Rohero, Ave. de la JRR House 17, Immeuble le savonnier, Rez-de-chaussee, Bujumbura.

== Authority ==
AREEN regulates portable water, energy, basic sanitation, petroleum and petroleum subsectors. The agency is responsible for issuance of electricity generation licenses, approval of water and electricity tariffs and other permits. It also undertakes displinary measures against entities that violate the terms and conditions of the permits issued. It is also a full member of the Energy Regulators Association of East Africa and of the Regional Association of Energy Regulators for Eastern and Southern Africa

=== Electric utilities ===
AREEN regulates REGIDESO Burundi (French: Régie de Production et de Distribution d’eau et d’électricité du Burundi), mini-grid operators and Independent Power Producers.

== Governance ==
The agency is supervised by a board of directors, chaired by eng. Gaëthan Nicayenzi. The director general of the authority is Balthazar Nganikiye.
