= Samerjai Suksumek =

Thai energy regulator

Samerjai Suksumek (Thai: เสมอใจ ศุขสุเมฆ, RTGS: Samoechai Suksumet) is a Thai energy-sector executive and senior government official who is serving as Chairman of the Energy Regulatory Commission of Thailand (ERC) since September 2018. He previously held senior roles in the Ministry of Energy, the Energy Policy and Planning Office (EPPO), and the Energy Fund Administration Institute (EFAI).

His chairmanship was officially confirmed by Royal Command published in the Royal Thai Government Gazette (Vol. 138, Special Section 261 ง, 29 October 2021).

== Early life and education ==
Publicly available information about Samerjai Suksumek’s early life is limited. He is a Thai national and career civil servant. His education is in the field of energy or engineering, though the exact degree and institution are not publicly disclosed.

== Career ==
=== Early Service ===
Samerjai began his career within Thailand’s Ministry of Energy. He served in the Energy Policy and Planning Office (EPPO), working on national energy-planning and security initiatives.

=== Director-General, EPPO (2013–2014) ===
From 2013 to 2014, Samerjai served as director-general of EPPO, where he oversaw Thailand’s energy-demand forecasts and policy planning. He was responsible for the country’s fuel strategy and electricity-market reform framework.

=== Deputy Permanent Secretary, Ministry of Energy (2014) ===
He was appointed Deputy Permanent Secretary of the Ministry of Energy in 2014, coordinating national policy between state-owned utilities and private-sector operators.

=== Director, Energy Fund Administration Institute (EFAI) (2015–2018) ===
Between 2015 and 2018, he served as Director of the Energy Fund Administration Institute (EFAI), responsible for managing Thailand’s fuel-stabilisation fund and energy efficiency programmes.

=== Chairman, Energy Regulatory Commission of Thailand (2018–2024) ===
Samerjai was appointed Chairman of the ERC by Royal Command on 14 September 2018, with his appointment formally published in the Royal Thai Government Gazette in October 2021.

As Chairman, he presided over tariff reviews, renewable-energy procurement programmes and regulatory reform efforts aimed at consumer protection and energy security. He represented Thailand in ASEAN and international energy forums through the Energy Regulators Regional Association (ERRA).

=== Adviser to the Minister of Energy (2024–present) ===
Following his ERC term, Samerjai was appointed adviser to the minister of energy and continues to represent Thailand in regional and global energy policy discussions.

== See also ==
- Energy Regulatory Commission (Thailand)
- Ministry of Energy (Thailand)
