= Energy Regulatory Office (Poland) =

- Urząd Regulacji Energetyki
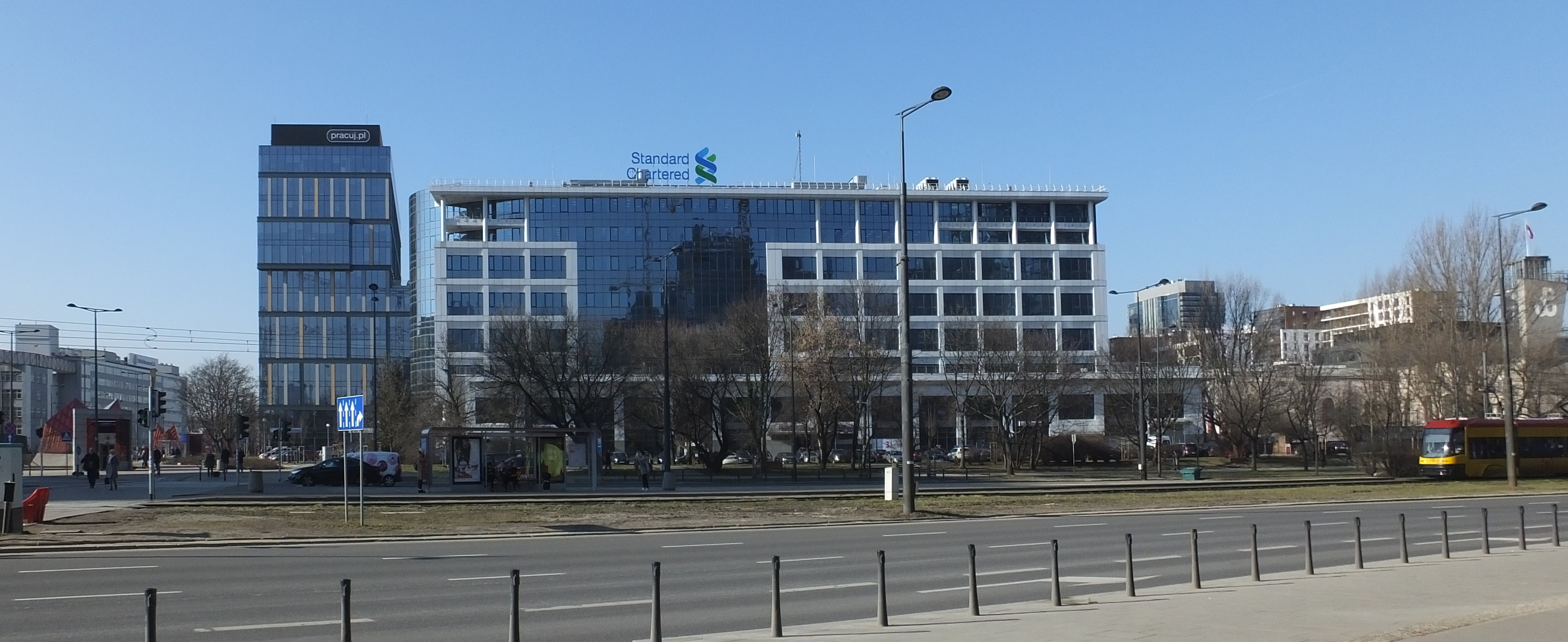

Agency overview
- Formed: June 23, 1997; 29 years ago
- Jurisdiction: Government of Poland
- Headquarters: Warsaw; 52°13′58″N 20°58′53″E
- Employees: 423
- Annual budget: 89.8 mln Zloty (2024)
- Website: ure.gov.pl

Energy Regulatory Office (Polish: Urząd Regulacji Energetyki) a Polish office serving the President of the Energy Regulatory Office, which is the central government authority operating under the Energy Law of April 10, 1997. It carries out tasks related to promoting competition and regulating the economy, including in the electricity, fuel, and gas markets. The Office's organization is defined by its statute, which is issued by order of the Prime Minister of Poland.

== History ==
Before the appointment of the President of the Energy Regulatory Office by the Energy Law of April 10, 1997, the central authority for energy management was the Chief Inspector of Energy Economy, whose bodies were local energy management inspectorates. At that time, energy companies were state-owned enterprises. Official prices, i.e., prices set by state administration bodies based on macroeconomic analysis, applied. For the energy sector, tariffs and price lists were established by the Minister of Finance based on the provisions of the Act of February 26, 1982, on Prices. Energy was understood as a common good, not a product.

The regulatory body, the President of the Energy Regulatory Office (URE), was established to implement and regulate the process of liberalizing energy markets to counteract the negative effects of natural monopolies and in the interest of ensuring sustainable energy security, improving the competitiveness of the economy, and protecting the environment from the negative effects of energy processes, in accordance with the government's economic policy priorities.

In the first half of 1998, seven regional offices of the URE were established in Gdańsk, Katowice, Kraków, Łódź, Poznań, Wrocław, and Warsaw, followed by two additional regional offices in Szczecin and Lublin.

The President of the URE issued the first heat generation license on July 31, 1998, for the Lublin-Wrotków Combined Heat and Power Plant in Lublin. The President of the Energy Regulatory Office approved the first electricity tariff on February 15, 1999, for Zielonogórskie Zakłady Energetyczne S.A.

The President of the Energy Regulatory Office granted the first ex officio license in the country on March 12, 1999, at the request of Vattenfall Poland Sp. z o.o.

== Structure ==
The President of the Energy Regulatory Office is the central government administration body established under the Energy Law of April 10, 1997, to achieve the goals set by the legislature.

The President of the Energy Regulatory Office regulates the activities of energy companies in accordance with the Act and the national energy policy, aiming to balance the interests of energy companies and fuel and energy consumers. Specific goals include:

- Creating conditions for sustainable development of the country;
- Ensuring energy security and the economical and rational use of fuels and energy;
- Developing competition;
- Counteracting the negative effects of natural monopolies;
- Taking into account environmental protection requirements and obligations arising from international agreements;
- Balancing the interests of energy companies and fuel and energy consumers.

The President of the Energy Regulatory Office is appointed for a five-year term by the Prime Minister from among candidates selected through an open and competitive recruitment process. The President of the Energy Regulatory Office may be reappointed only once.

The basic authority-based provision defining the responsibilities of the President of the Energy Regulatory Office is Article 133 of the Energy Regulatory Office. Article 23 of the Energy Law. This provision, following numerous amendments, contains an extensive catalog of this body's powers, determined by the growing scope of responsibilities of energy companies. The legislator's intensive legislative actions have a significant impact on the scope of duties performed by the President of the Energy Regulatory Office, which has been continually expanding in recent years.

The President of the Energy Regulatory Office also carries out tasks arising from EU regulations, the issuance of which was intended to accelerate the process of building a common electricity market and a common gas market.

The President of the Energy Regulatory Office (URE) exercises its powers with the assistance of the Energy Regulatory Office, which currently consists of a central office and eight regional offices.

== Chairmen ==
- Leszek Juchniewicz (from June 23, 1997, to August 1, 2007)
- Adam Szafrański (from August 1 to November 13, 2007)
- Mariusz Swora (from November 13, 2007, to December 21, 2010)
- Marek Woszczyk (from June 1, 2011, to December 13, 2013; from December 21, 2010, to June 1, 2011, as acting)
- Maciej Bando (from June 2, 2014, to June 2019; from December 13, 2013, to June 2, 2014, as acting)
- Rafał Gawin (from July 24, 2019, to August 11, 2025)
- Renata Mroczek (from August 11, 2025)
