= Egyptian Electric Utility and Consumer Protection Regulatory Agency =

- Industry: Electricity
- Headquarters: Nasr City, Egypt
- Key people: Dr.Ali Mohamed Abd Elfattah (Chairman)
- Parent: Government of Egypt
- Website: www.egyptera.org/en/

The Electricity Regulatory Authority and Consumer Protection (EgyptERA) is a public body independent of the parties to the electricity utility with a legal personality and headquartered in Cairo. It was established by virtue of Republican Decree No. 326 of 1997, amended by Decree No. 339 of 2000, reorganizing the Electricity Regulatory Authority and Consumer Protection, Electricity Law No. 87 of 2015, and Decision of the Minister of Electricity and Renewable Energy No. 230 of 2016 issuing the executive regulations of the Electricity Law issued by Law No. 87 of 2015.

== See also ==
- List of energy regulatory bodies
- Electricity distribution companies by country
- Electricity sector in Egypt
