= Zanzibar Electricity Corporation =

State owned utility firm

- Company type: Public utility
- Industry: Energy
- Predecessor: The State Fuel and Power Corporation (1964-2006)
- Founded: 2006
- Headquarters: ZECO HQ, Gulioni Street, Zanzibar, Tanzania
- Area served: Zanzibar Archipelago
- Key people: Haji Mohamed Haji(General Manager)
- Products: Electricity
- Services: Electricity Transmission, Electricity Distribution
- Owner: Government of Zanzibar (100%)
- Website: zeco.co.tz

Zanzibar Electricity Corporation is a state owned utility firm that provides transmission and distribution service of electricity in the Zanzibar Archipelago. The firm was incorporated in 2006 as the successor of the State Fuel and Power Corporation and is wholly owned by the Revolutionary Government of Zanzibar.

== History ==
=== Background ===
==== Electricity in Zanzibar ====
Electricity in Zanzibar dates back to the early 1870s. In 1875, the first coal fired generator was installed on the island to power Stone Town. In 1954 the coal plants were abandoned and new diesel generators were installed by the British East Africa Company. In 1980 the main island of Unguja was connected to the Tanzanian National Grid via a 132kV, 45MW sub-marine cable and the diesel generators were decommissioned.

==== Electricity in Pemba ====
The first power plant on the island of Pemba was commissioned in 1958 and was called the Tibirinzi power station. Over the years the government continued to build small diesel generators to meet the growing demand. However, in 1985 the government replaced the Tibirinzi power station and inaugurated the Wesha Power station. The power station had three diesel generators with a total capacity of 4.5 MW. Pemba was also connected to the national grid through a submarine cable from Pangani. The 33kV, 20 MW cable runs from Pangani, to Tanga to Ras Mkumbuu.

== Corporate affairs ==
=== Ownership ===
The corporation is 100% wholly owned by the Revolutionary Government of Zanzibar, under the umbrella of the Ministry of Land, Housing, Water and Energy of Zanzibar. The Union government or mainland government do not have any ownership or executive control in the company. The company is controlled by a board of directors directly appointed by the ministry.

== See also ==
- 2008 Zanzibar power blackout
- Tanzania Electric Supply Company Limited
