= Energy Regulatory Commission (Thailand) =

Electricity industry regulator in Thailand

The Energy Regulatory Commission of Thailand (ERC) is the independent state regulator for Thailand's electricity industry, natural-gas industry and energy-network systems. It was created by the Energy Industry Act B.E. 2550 (2007), which took effect on 11 December 2007; the first board assumed office in February 2008.

== Primary duties ==
The ERC's principal functions under the Act and subsidiary regulations include:

- issuing licences, regulations and binding notifications for electricity and gas operations (generation, transmission, distribution, LNG and pipelines); setting tariff methodologies and service standards; and enforcing compliance;
- regulating tariffs and non-discriminatory network access; supervising reliability/quality of supply; and protecting consumers via complaint mechanisms and minimum service standards;
- overseeing procurement frameworks (e.g., PPAs) and programmes for independent, small and very-small power producers, including renewable-energy schemes.

== Jurisdiction and authorities ==
The commission's jurisdiction covers the electricity industry, the natural-gas industry (pipeline and LNG), and energy-network systems nationwide. Commissioners are appointed by His Majesty the King on the Cabinet's recommendation to a single six-year term without immediate reappointment. The ERC may issue regulations and administrative orders, approve and monitor power-purchase agreements, and suspend or revoke licences for non-compliance. The Office of the Energy Regulatory Commission (OERC) serves as the secretariat and operates regional offices nationwide.

== Commissioners ==
=== Current board (term beginning 2021) ===
As listed by the ERC:

Samerjai Suksumek — Chairman.

Buntoon Srethasirote — Commissioner.

Narin Opamuratawongse — Commissioner.

Pitak Janyapong — Commissioner.

Worawit Srianunraksa — Commissioner.

=== Past commissioners ===
Prof Emeritus Dr Direk Lavansiri — founding Chairman (appointed February 2008 by Royal Command).

Assoc Prof Sudharma Yoonaidharma — Commissioner (first ERC term; energy-sector academic and former telecoms regulator).

Duangmanee Komaratat — Commissioner.

Kraisi Karnasuta — Commissioner.

== Chairperson ==
Chairman: Samerjai Suksumek (since 2018).

Founding chairman: Prof Emeritus Dr Direk Lavansiri (2008).

== History ==
Before 2007, electricity and gas regulation in Thailand was dispersed across ministries and state utilities. The Energy Industry Act B.E. 2550 (2007) separated policy (National Energy Policy Council), regulation (ERC), and operations (e.g., EGAT, MEA, PEA), and the first ERC board took office on 1 February 2008.

Since establishment the ERC has issued grid codes and supply-quality standards, run competitive procurement for small producers, and expanded renewable-energy programmes (including very-small power producer procurement). In 2025, the ERC announced a strategic roadmap emphasising tariff stability and clean-energy transition.

== See also ==
- Electricity Generating Authority of Thailand
- Provincial Electricity Authority
- Metropolitan Electricity Authority
- List of energy regulatory bodies
