= Victoria Cup (rugby union) =

Africa rugby series

- Sport: Rugby union
- Founded: 2010
- Country: Kenya; Uganda; Zambia; Zimbabwe
- Most recent champion: Zimbabwe (2019)
- Broadcaster: (Zimbabwe) Kwese sports
- Related competitions: Elgon Cup

The Victoria Cup is a rugby union tournament contested by the four African nations of Kenya, Uganda, Zambia and Zimbabwe as of 2019. After a seven-year hiatus, the competition was revived following Rugby Africa's cancellation of the Africa Gold Cup in 2019 due to sponsorship loss.

In 2010 and 2011, the Victoria Cup was played as a tri-nations tournament between Kenya, Zimbabwe and Uganda on a double round-robin basis, with the teams playing home-and-away. The competition was discontinued in 2012 after Uganda and Zimbabwe withdrew due to financial difficulties.

The cup is named after Lake Victoria in Kenya and Victoria Falls, which were named in honour the reigning queen Victoria and her great-grandmother.

== Champions ==
The Victoria Cup winners and runners-up from the inaugural tri-nations tournament of 2010 onward are listed below:

Year	Teams	Winner	Runner-up	Ref
2019	4	Zimbabwe	Kenya	
2013–2018	Not contested			
2012	Cancelled			
2011	3	Zimbabwe	Kenya	
2010	3	Kenya	Zimbabwe	

== Precursor: 1958–2009 ==
The results of matches involving Kenya, Zimbabwe and Uganda from 1958–2009 are listed below:

Date	Home	Score	Visitor	Venue	Notes
2009-08-29	Uganda	18 – 13	Kenya	Kyadondo Grounds, Kampala, Uganda	Elgon Cup 2009 Round 2.
2009-08-15	Kenya	30 – 22	Uganda	RFUEA Ground, Nairobi, Kenya	Elgon Cup 2009 Round 1.
2008-08-16	Kenya	39 – 20	Uganda	RFUEA Ground, Nairobi, Kenya	Elgon Cup 2008 Round 2.
2008-05-24	Uganda	20 – 3	Kenya	Kyadondo Grounds, Kampala, Uganda	Elgon Cup 2008 Round 1.
2007-09-26	Uganda	24 – 12	Kenya	Mahamasina Municipal Stadium, Antananarivo, Madagascar	Semi final of the Africa Cup
2007-08-11	Kenya	33 – 15	Uganda	RFUEA Ground, Nairobi, Kenya	Elgon Cup 2007 Round 2.
2007-05-26	Uganda	29 – 10	Kenya	Kyadondo Grounds, Kampala, Uganda	Elgon Cup 2007 Round 1.
2006-08-12	Kenya	20 – 22	Uganda	RFUEA Ground, Nairobi, Kenya	Elgon Cup 2006 Round 2.
2006-05-13	Uganda	7 – 7	Kenya	Kyadondo Grounds, Kampala, Uganda	Elgon Cup 2006 Round 1.
2005-08-27	Uganda	5 – 13	Zimbabwe	Kampala	Confederation of African Rugby (CAR) Championship, Division 1, Pool A
2005-08-20	Uganda	20 – 9	Zimbabwe	Kampala	RWC Qualifier, Africa, Round 1B, Playoff 2nd leg
2005-08-06	Zimbabwe	22 – 16	Uganda	Harare Sports Club, Harare, Zimbabwe	RWC Qualifier, Africa, Round 1B, Playoff 1st leg
2005-06-25	Uganda	5 – 8	Kenya		
2004-09-11	Zimbabwe	17 – 0	Uganda	Harare Sports Club, Harare, Zimbabwe	African CAR Championship, Division 1 South, Pool 1
2004-07-31	Kenya	18 – 8	Uganda	RFUEA Ground, Nairobi, Kenya	
2004-07-24	Zimbabwe	24 – 15	Kenya	Hartsfield Ground, Bulawayo, Zimbabwe	Friendly, Kenya Tour
2003-07-05	Uganda	25 – 3	Zimbabwe	Kampala	African CAR Championship, Division 1, Pool B
2003-06-14	Uganda	21 – 22	Kenya	Kampala	
2003-05-25	Kenya	32 – 24	Zimbabwe	RFUEA Ground, Nairobi, Kenya	Friendly, Zimbabwe tour
2002-10-05	Kenya	22 – 31	Uganda	RFUEA Ground, Nairobi, Kenya	
2002-09-28	Kenya	19 – 12	Zimbabwe	RFUEA Ground, Nairobi, Kenya	Kenya Airways Cup
2002-07-21	Uganda	8 – 12	Kenya		
2002-05-18	Zimbabwe	43 – 0	Uganda	Harare Sports Club, Harare, Zimbabwe	Friendly, Uganda tour. First match between these two nations. Used by Zimbabwe as warm up for RWC qualifying.
2001-09-29	Kenya	44 – 17	Uganda	RFUEA Ground, Nairobi, Kenya	
2001-07-28	Kenya	12 – 9	Uganda	RFUEA Ground, Nairobi, Kenya	
1997-08-23	Kenya	65 – 8	Uganda	RFUEA Ground, Nairobi, Kenya	
1993-07-03	Kenya	7 – 42	Zimbabwe	RFUEA Ground, Nairobi, Kenya	RWC Qualifier, Africa, Round 1, Group 2. Match Report
1989-08-13	Kenya	9 – 56	Zimbabwe	Harare Sports Club, Harare, Zimbabwe	Friendly, Kenya Tour. Score was 6 – 22 at half-time.
1987-08-07	Kenya	12 – 44	Zimbabwe	Nairobi	Confederation of African Rugby (CAR) Championship. Score was 3 – 26 at half-time.
1985-05-01	Zimbabwe	15 – 13	Kenya	RFUEA Ground, Nairobi, Kenya	Friendly, Zimbabwe tour.
1982-03-27	Zimbabwe	15 – 12	East Africa	Sailsbury Sports Club, Sailsbury, Zimbabwe	Match was between Zimbabwe and East Africa (not Kenya) on their Seventh Tuskers Tour to Zambia and Zimbabwe. See Note^{[c]} Sailsbury had not yet been renamed as Harare.
1981-05-23	Kenya	24 – 34	Zimbabwe	RFUEA Ground, Nairobi, Kenya	Friendly, Zimbabwe tour. First match between these two nations.
	Kenya; Uganda; Uganda; Kenya	–	Uganda; Kenya; Kenya; Uganda		Between 1960 and 1980 there were frequent but irregular matches between Kenya and Uganda; records of the results of these matches may not have survived.
1958-05-24	Uganda	11 – 21	Kenya	Kampala	First official match between these 'nations' although at the time they were regarded as 'districts' within the British Empire.

== Notes ==
a. Lake Victoria and the Victoria Falls are not connected contrary to some reports. The only major river that flows out of Lake Victoria is the River Nile which flows north to the Mediterranean Sea. The Victoria Falls are on the Zambezi River which begins in Zambia and runs south and east to empty into the Indian Ocean.

b. Lake Victoria is Africa’s largest lake it is also the largest tropical lake and the second largest freshwater lake in the world. While the Victoria Falls are neither the highest nor the widest waterfall in the world, it is claimed to be the largest sheet of falling water in the world measuring some 184,500 sq meters.

c. The 1982 match between the Zimbabwe and East Africa is often listed in popular online databases as being Zimbabwe v Kenya. In fact it was played by East Africa on the Seventh Tuskers Tour to Zambia and Zimbabwe. Though this team was almost exclusively (if not entirely) made up of Kenyan players, it is not technically a Kenya v Zimbabwe result. As the Lions is made up of players from England, Ireland, Scotland and Wales, so the East Africa team selects players from Kenya, Uganda and Tanzania.
