= Energy and Petroleum Regulatory Authority =

Energy regulator in Kenya

- EPRA
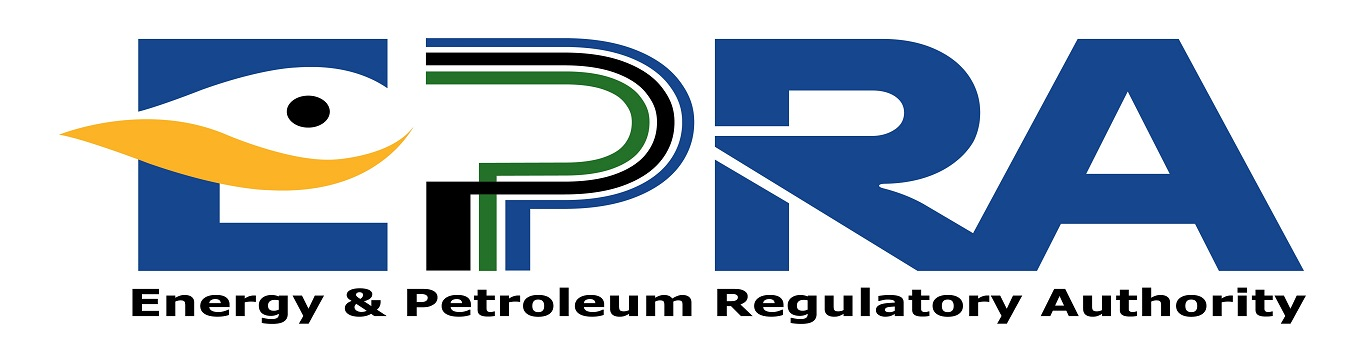

Agency overview
- Formed: 2019
- Jurisdiction: Kenya
- Headquarters: Eagle Africa Centre Longonot Road, Upperhill Nairobi, Kenya
- Agency executives: Chairperson, Moses Wekesa Mwambu Mabonga; Ag.Director general, Joseph Oketch
- Parent agency: Ministry of Energy (Kenya); Ministry of Petroleum and Mining
- Website: https://www.epra.go.ke/

Map
- Energy and Petroleum Regulatory Authority (Kenya)

The Energy and Petroleum Regulatory Authority (EPRA), formerly the Energy Regulatory Commission (ERC) is an independent regulatory authority responsible for technical and economic regulation of electricity, petroleum (upstream, midstream and downstream) and renewable energy subsectors in Kenya.

== History ==
The Electric Power Act of 1997 created the Electricity Regulatory Board (ERB) whose mandate was to regulate the electricity subsector in Kenya. Subsequent reforms in the energy sector informed the creation of the Energy Regulatory Commission through the promulgation of Energy Act No 12 of 2006 and revised in 2012. The Energy Act No 1 of 2019 repealed the Energy Act no 12 of 2006 allowing for the establishment of the Energy and Petroleum Regulatory Authority(EPRA) with and expanded mandate to regulate the entire energy sector.

== Location ==
The offices of the Energy and Petroleum Regulatory Authority are located at the Eagle Africa Centre, Longonot Road, Upper Hill, Nairobi city.

== Authority ==
The Energy and Petroleum Regulatory Authority regulates the electric utilities, Petroleum industry and Coal development in Kenya through the Energy Act of 2019. It carries out Licensing, Economic regulation, enforcement and compliance and complaints and dispute resolution.

=== Electric utilities ===
EPRA regulates several electric utilities; Kenya Electricity Generating Company, Geothermal Development Company, Kenya Electricity Transmission Company, Kenya Power and Lighting Company, Rural Electrification and Renewable Energy Corporation, mini-grid operators and Independent Power Producers.

=== Petroleum utilities ===
EPRA regulates several Petroleum utilities;Kenya Pipeline Company, the National Oil Corporation of Kenya and Oil Marketing Companies. It also regulates the upstream petroleum and the Coal development.

== Members ==
The board of directors are appointed by the Cabinet secretary of Energy while the chairperson is appointed by the President of the Republic of Kenya for a term of three years except the chairperson of the board whose term is four years. The contract is subject to renewal for one more term. The 2022 chairperson is Jackton Boma Ojwang. The current board members are; Gordon .O. Kihalangwa, Andrew N. Kamau, Albert Mwenda, Mercy Muthoni Wambugu, Barnabas Ngeno, Daniel Ndonye, James Mbugua, Moses Mutuli, George Mwakule and Masini J. Ichwara.

== Auxiliary institutions and allied agencies ==
- Kenya Electricity Generating Company
- Geothermal Development Company
- Kenya Electricity Transmission Company
- Kenya Power and Lighting Company
- Rural Electrification and Renewable Energy Corporation
- Nuclear Power and Energy Agency
- Kenya Pipeline Company
- National Oil Corporation of Kenya

== See also ==
- Energy Regulators Association of East Africa
- Regional Association of Energy Regulators for Eastern and Southern Africa
