= 2008 Zanzibar power blackout =

Power outage in Zanzibar, Tanzania

The 2008 Zanzibar Power blackout was an extensive power outage on Zanzibar, Tanzania.

During May and June 2008, Zanzibar suffered a period of almost one month without mains electricity due to a grid failure which left the entire island dependent on alternative methods of electricity generation (mainly diesel generators). The power outage occurred on 21 May 2008 causing a wide-area grid failure across the Tanzanian network followed by a power surge which damaged the submarine interconnector cable that links the Tanzanian mainland and Zanzibar.

The power was eventually restored on 19 June 2008, however, concerns remained about the fragility of the island's transmission infrastructure, its near total dependence on the mainland for its electricity generation, and the capacity and condition of the ageing interconnector that links the mainland electricity network and the island grid.

A similar but longer event happened in Zanzibar in 2009. During this occurrence, the island was without power for more than three months.

== Effects ==
Tourism in Zanzibar, the main income generating activity on the islands, was seriously disrupted by the outage. Other important industries, including the Zanzibar Electricity Corporation and independent small businesses were "severely hit" by the blackout. The island's semi-autonomous government was criticized for its lack of preparedness and dependence on power from mainland Tanzania.

== Recurrence in 2009 ==
On 10 December 2009, Zanzibar was again plunged into darkness because of failure of the undersea cable. On 23 December 2009, the Isles Minister of Energy and Construction, Mansour Yussuf Himid, was quoted in the Daily News newspaper published in Dar es Salaam as saying that the blackout would last until the end of February while a critical spare part known as a "splitter" was being sourced from overseas. He was also quoted as saying that the undersea cable was dilapidated and needed to be replaced entirely.

The undersea cable had a projected working life of 25 years when laid in 1976. It had then served for almost 35 years, ten years after it was due to be replaced.

The power in Zanzibar was restored in March, 2010.
