= Ngalula Mubenga =

Congolese engineer and academic

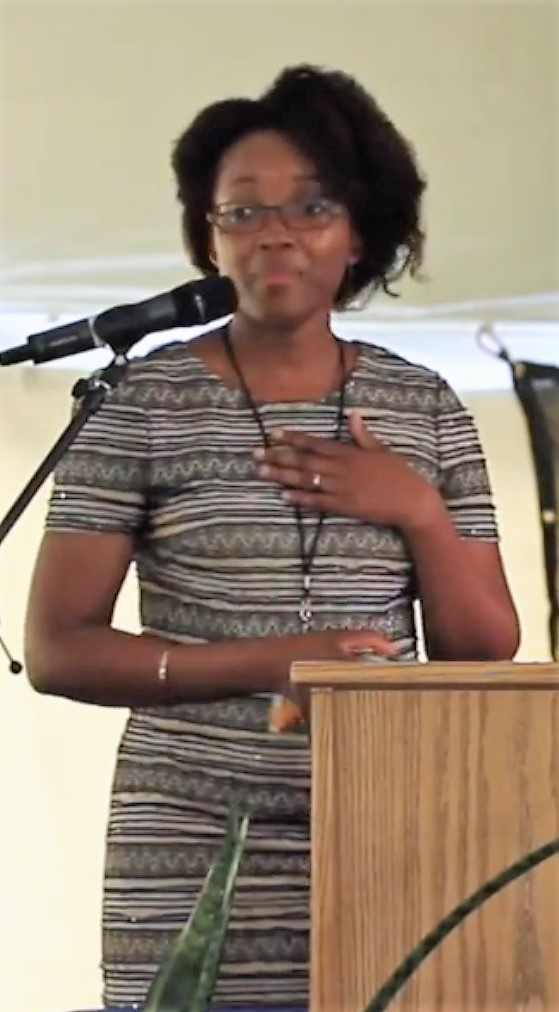
- Mubenga in 2016
- Born: Ngalula Sandrine Mubenga; Kinshasa
- Education: University of Toledo (PhD)
- Scientific career
- Workplaces: University of Toledo
- Thesis: A Lithium-Ion Battery Management System with Bilevel Equalization. (2017)
- Website: sminpowergroup.com drmubenga.com stemdrc.org

Ngalula Sandrine Mubenga is a Congolese engineer, professor of electrical engineering technology, entrepreneur, philanthropist, and government official leading electrification initiatives in the Democratic Republic of the Congo.

== Early life and education ==
Mubenga was born in Kinshasa and is the daughter of a United Nations diplomat. She grew up in the Democratic Republic of the Congo, France, Senegal and the United States. At age 17, she was hospitalized with appendicitis, and needed surgery, but the city had run out of power, nearly causing her death. Mubenga studied electronic engineering at the University of Toledo and graduated in 2005. She has three kids and a husband. Her master's research considered hybrid vehicles that included hydrogen fuel cells. In 2011, she became a licensed engineer. Her doctoral research, also at the University of Toledo, involved the development of a bilevel equaliser, and was the first to combine an active and low-cost passive equaliser. The equaliser could be used to extend the battery life of lithium-ion batteries.

== Research and career ==
Her research considers sustainable energy. After earning her doctorate she was appointed as an assistant professor at the University of Toledo.

Mubenga founded the SMIN Power Group in 2011, which develops renewable energy solutions for people in Africa. Alongside their work in engineering, SMIN provides financial support to African students who study science and work on initiatives to tackle climate change. Mubenga launched the STEM DRC initiative, which looks to encourage African young people to become inspired by science and engineering.

=== Awards and honors ===
Her awards and honors include:

- 2009 Democratic Republic of the Congo Nkyoi Mérite
- 2010 Institute of Electrical and Electronics Engineers Toledo Young Engineer of the Year Award
- 2017 Africa's Most Influential Woman in Business
- 2017 Appointed to Board of Directors of Société Nationale d'Électricité (SNEL)
- 2018 DesignNews Most Important Black Women Engineers
- 2018 Institute of Electrical and Electronics Engineers Engineer of the Year
- 2020 Appointed Director General of the Electricity Regulatory Agency in the DRC
