= Geothermal Development Company =

Kenyan state-owned company

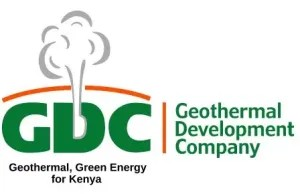

Agency overview
- Formed: 2008
- Jurisdiction: Kenya
- Headquarters: Kawi House, South C Bellevue, Popo Lane, Off Red Cross Road, Nairobi
- Motto: Geothermal, Green Energy for Kenya
- Agency executives: Hon. Walter Osebe Nyambati, Chairman of the Board of Directors; Mr. Stephen Busieney, Acting Managing Director & Chief Executive Officer
- Parent department: Ministry of Energy
- Website: www.gdc.co.ke

The Geothermal Development Company (GDC) is a wholly owned parastatal of the Government of Kenya. It is mandated to execute surface geothermal development, including prospecting for, drilling, harnessing and selling geothermal energy to electricity-generating companies for energy production and sale to the national grid.

== Location ==
The headquarters of GDC are located in the capital city of Nairobi, at Kawi House, in the neighborhood known as South C.

== Overview ==
The country was heavily dependent on hydroelectric energy from the time of independence until the early 2000s. Due to unpredictable rainfall patterns, the levels of the country's rivers fell and Kenya underwent a marked reduction in electricity output in the 2003 - 2006 time frame. In an attempt to reduce the over-reliance on hydroelectric energy and its susceptibility to weather changes, GDC was formed in 2008 as a Special Purpose Vehicle to carry out rapid geothermal exploration and drilling in the country to enable the Kenya Electricity Generating Company and Independent Power Producers (IPPs) to build power stations and not only diversify the national electricity grid, but also to fulfil a pledge to install 5,000 MW of electricity in the country by the year 2030.

Outside development partners have offered help. GDC has plans to develop academic courses in geothermal energy at Kenyan universities, starting with courses at Dedan Kimathi University of Technology.

== Recent developments ==
In 2023, a new CEO was appointed to head the organisation.

== See also ==
- List of power stations in Kenya
- Kenya Electricity Generating Company
- Kenya Power and Lighting Company
- Geothermal power in Kenya
