= Elgon Cup =

Men's rugby union tournament

- Sport: Rugby union
- Founded: 2004
- No. of teams: 2 (Men's); 2 (Women's)
- Country: Kenya; Uganda
- Most recent champions: Kenya (2024) Men's; Kenya (2023) Women's
- Broadcaster: (South Africa) Supersport
- Related competitions: Victoria Cup

The Elgon Cup is contested between the rugby union teams of Kenya and Uganda. The men's and women's teams of these countries each compete annually for their respective cups on a Home-and-Away basis. The competition and the cups are named after Mount Elgon, a mountain on the border of the two countries.

The men's competition started in 2004 while the women's Elgon Cup followed it a few years later, starting in 2006. The Elgon cup has now been subsumed into the recently instituted Victoria Cup; just as the Bledisloe Cup (Australia and New Zealand), Freedom Cup (New Zealand and South Africa) and Mandela Challenge Plate (Australia and South Africa) have been subsumed into the Tri Nations and as the Calcutta Cup (England and Scotland) is now part of the Six Nations.

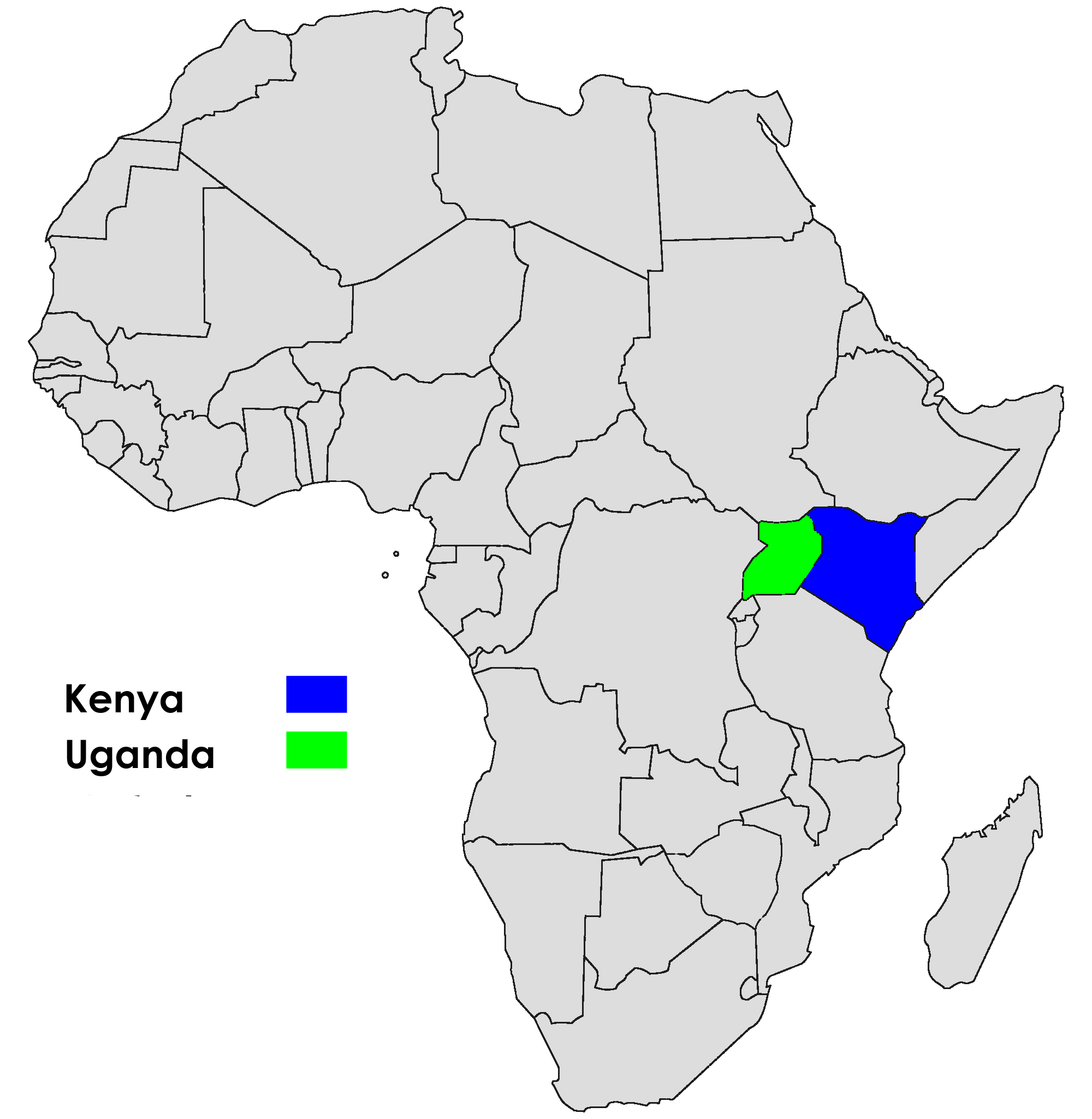
The countries that play in the Elgon Cup

Home matches for Kenya are usually played at the RFUEA Ground, Nairobi, Kenya, whilst Uganda usually play their home matches at the Kyadondo Grounds, Kampala, Uganda. The women's games generally serve as a curtain raiser to the men's games.

== History ==
=== Earliest encounters ===
Kenya and Uganda have a long history of rugby matches going back even before the first official match in 1958. Prior to the formation of the Rugby Football Union of Kenya (RFUK)^{[a]} in 1921 and the Uganda Rugby Football Union (URFU) in 1955, these two territories put out representative sides though, without a governing union, they could not award caps. Games were frequently played in the early days by representative sides from Kenya and Uganda (and also Tanganyika) against each other and against touring sides most notably from Royal Naval vessels and British and South African Universities (the University of Stellenbosch, University of Cape Town, Rhodes University and the Universities of Oxford and Cambridge).

The very first match between Kenya and Uganda involved an incident that may well be unique in international rugby history. In the early 1930s there was only one rugby club in Uganda (the Uganda RFC, later to become "Uganda Kobs RFC" and then "Kampala Kobs RFC") and a number of Ugandan players (including Percy Minns) persuaded the Kenya clubs to send a Kenya XV to play against them in Entebbe. Unfortunately, both teams arrived with a set of white jerseys. According to long established tradition in rugby, it is the duty of the home side to change shirts in the event of a clash; about 10 miles from the clubhouse in Kampala, Uganda resorted to dying their shirts in the water-bucket on the sideline using the iodine from the medical kit. The shirts were worn wet and, according to contemporary reports, the spectators and referee had greater and greater difficulty telling the sides apart as the game progressed. Rugby is a game rooted deeply in tradition and, as a result of this incident, Ugandan representative sides wore black shirts for almost 100 years in memory of this incident. It is only recently that they have started wearing shirts that include red and orange, the other two colours present in the Ugandan flag, though the predominant colour still tends to be black.

=== The first official matches ===
The three African Great Lakes countries of Kenya, Tanzania and Uganda have a long shared history of rugby. For much of their history, they have relied on each other for club, inter-district, inter-territorial and international matches, as well as combining their resources to create a regional squad. This has all been aided by their membership in the Rugby Football Union of East Africa (RFUEA), an umbrella union for the three nations both before and after they each achieved independence in the early 1960s. Until independence, each was regarded as a colonial possession of the British Empire rather than an independent nation.

The first interterritorial match for Kenya took place in 1954 at Arusha against Tanganyika (as Tanzania was known at the time). It was held shortly before the First Tuskers Copperbelt tour later that year and served as a selection trial for the tour. This match was won by Kenya though the exact score is not known. This fixture was repeated in 1955 and 1956. With the URFU having recently been formed, it was decided to attempt a three-way competition in 1957; Uganda were to travel play Tanganyika in Arusha and Kenya were to visit Uganda in Kampala. Uganda, who were chiefly responsible for the initiative, fulfilled their commitment though the score or winner is not known. Kenya were unable to travel to play Uganda as organised due to commitments raised by the Combined Oxford and Cambridge Universities tour that year.

The first official match between Uganda and Kenya took place in 1958, when Kenya (then Kenya Colony) travelled to play Uganda (then Uganda Protectorate) in Kampala. Kenya beat Uganda by three goals and two tries to one goal, one penalty goal and one try. In 1958, a try was worth three points, so the final score was 11 – 21.

1958

Uganda	11 – 21	Kenya
Try: (2); Con: (1); Pen: (1); Drop: None		Try: (5); Con: (3); Pen: None; Drop: None

Kampala, Uganda

Team Lists

(Uganda) UGANDA
		Player	Club
FB	15	P.F.H. Williams	Kampala RFC
RW	14	N.B. Hooper	Kampala RFC
OC	13	M. Forster	Kampala RFC
IC	12	E.R. McKay	Nile RFC
LW	11	J. Henderson	Nile RFC
FH	10	J. O'Neill	Kampala RFC
SH	9	A. Knott	Kampala RFC
LP	1	A.P. Constable	Uganda Police RFC
HK	2	R. Yeates	Uganda Police RFC
TP	3	B.S. Bennie	Kampala RFC
LL	4	C.A.G. Hogg	Uganda Police RFC
RL	5	G. Williams	Kampala RFC
BF	6	H. Klynsmith	Kampala RFC
OF	7	I.J. Pook	Elgon RFC
N8	8	S. Golledge	Nile RFC

KENYA (Kenya)
		Player	Club
FB	15	G.D. Brown	Impala RFC
RW	14	B. Granville-Ross	Nondescripts RFC
OC	13	D.F. Rees	Kenya Harlequins
IC	12	G.P. Meintjes	Eldoret RFC
LW	11	W.R. Millar	Nakuru RFC
FH	10	D. Opie	Nakuru RFC
SH	9	W. Law	Nakuru RFC
LP	1	L. Tucker	Nakuru RFC
HK	2	R. Pollastri	Nakuru RFC
TP	3	B. Hatfield	Kitale RFC
LL	4	K.V. Oulton	Nakuru RFC
RL	5	D.S. Reynolds	Nakuru RFC
BF	6	D. Kennedy	Nakuru RFC
OF	7	E. Evans	Kericho RFC
N8	8	S. Luow	Impala RFC

=== Post Colonial Rugby ===
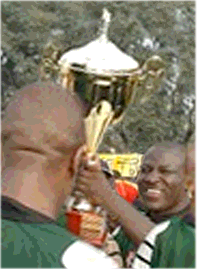
Photo of Kenya players holding the Elgon Cup

Kenya's relatively smooth transition to independence and trouble free ensuing years under President Jomo Kenyatta saw rugby continue to thrive in this country. Despite the fact that Idi Amin was a keen rugby player himself, the expulsion of expatriates from - and the general political instability in - Uganda under his reign disrupted the playing of domestic and international fixtures in Uganda. As a result, Kenya have generally had the upper-hand in this East African derby. However, in recent years the success of the Kenya 7's team has had a negative effect on the 15-a-side game as resources and focus has shifted toward the shortened version of the game. This and the recent resurgence in the Ugandan rugby club scene has seen the balance of power shift westwards.

=== Victoria Cup ===
The most recent innovation has been the Victoria Cup. This is slated to be an annual three-way competition between Kenya, Uganda and Zimbabwe played on a home-and-away basis. Rather than duplicate the fixture it has been decided that the pre-existing Elgon Cup games between Kenya and Uganda will take place within this new tournament. The Victoria Cup was first played in June and July 2010.

== Matches between Kenya and Uganda with Elgon Cup winners ==
Results for men's and women's international rugby matches played between Kenya and Uganda are presented in the table below.

Results

MEN
Year	Date	Home	Score	Away	Elgon Cup Winner
2024	16 Nov	Uganda	5 – 21	Kenya	Won by Kenya
2024	9 Nov	Kenya	27 – 25	Uganda	Won by Kenya
2023	11 Nov	Kenya	20 – 13	Uganda	Won by Kenya
2023	9 Nov	Uganda	21 – 20	Kenya	Won by Kenya
2020–2022: Edition was not held
2019	13 July	Uganda	5 – 16	Kenya	Won by Kenya
2019	22 Jun	Kenya	13 – 16	Uganda	Won by Kenya
2018	7 Jun	Kenya	38 – 22	Uganda	Won by Kenya
2018	26 May	Uganda	16 – 34	Kenya	Won by Kenya
2017	24 Jun	Kenya	33 – 33	Uganda	Won by Kenya
2017	10 Jun	Uganda	15 – 23	Kenya	Won by Kenya
2016	30 Jul	Kenya	45 – 24	Uganda	Won by Kenya
2016	4 Jun	Uganda	10 – 48	Kenya	Won by Kenya
2014–2015: Edition was not held
2013	10 Jul	Uganda	11 – 51	Kenya	Non-Elgon Cup match.
2013	22 Jun	Uganda	13 – 19	Kenya	Won on aggregate by Kenya
2013	15 Jun	Kenya	16 – 17	Uganda	Won on aggregate by Kenya
2012	10 Jul	Kenya	19 – 20	Uganda	Non-Elgon Cup match.
2012	28 Apr	Kenya	12 – 0	Uganda	Won on aggregate by Uganda
2012	21 Apr	Uganda	19 – 5	Kenya	Won on aggregate by Uganda
2011	16 Jul	Uganda	32 – 18	Kenya	Won on aggregate by Kenya
2011	9 Jul	Kenya	27 – 10	Uganda	Won on aggregate by Kenya
2010	10 Jul	Kenya	21 – 5	Uganda	Won on aggregate by Kenya
2010	3 Jul	Uganda	25 – 33	Kenya	Won on aggregate by Kenya
2009	29 Aug	Uganda	18 – 13	Kenya	Won on aggregate by Kenya
2009	15 Aug	Kenya	30 – 22	Uganda	Won on aggregate by Kenya
2008	16 Aug	Kenya	39 – 20	Uganda	Won on aggregate by Kenya
2008	24 May	Uganda	20 – 3	Kenya	Won on aggregate by Kenya
2007	26 Sep	Uganda	24 – 12	Kenya	Non-Elgon Cup match.
2007	11 Aug	Kenya	35 – 15	Uganda	Won on aggregate by Kenya
2007	26 May	Uganda	29 – 10	Kenya	Won on aggregate by Kenya
2006	12 Aug	Kenya	20 – 22	Uganda	Won on aggregate by Uganda
2006	13 May	Uganda	7 – 7	Kenya	Won on aggregate by Uganda
2005	Edition cancelled – World Cup qualifiers took precedence.
2005	25 Jun	Uganda	5 – 8	Kenya
2004	31 Jul	Kenya	18 – 8	Uganda
2003	14 Jun	Uganda	21 – 22	Kenya
2002	5 Oct	Kenya	22 – 31	Uganda
2002	21 Jul	Uganda	8 – 12	Kenya
2001	29 Sep	Kenya	44 – 17	Uganda
2001	28 Jul	Kenya	12 – 9	Uganda
2000			–
1999			–
1998			–
1997			–
1997	23 Aug	Kenya	65 – 8	Uganda
1996			–
1995			–
			–
1958	24 May	Uganda	11 – 21	Kenya

WOMEN
Year	Date	Home	Score	Away	Elgon Cup Winner
2023	11 Nov	Kenya	87 – 3	Uganda	Won by Kenya
2020-2022 Edition was not held
2019	13 Jul	Uganda	5 – 35	Kenya	Won by Kenya
2019	22 Jun	Kenya	44 – 13	Uganda	Won by Kenya
2016-2018 Edition was not held
2015	20 Jun	Uganda	6 – 7	Kenya	Won by Kenya
2015	13 Jun	Kenya	5 – 5	Uganda	Won by Kenya
2014	19 Jul	Kenya	39 – 10	Uganda	Won by Kenya
2014	12 Jul	Uganda	15 – 33	Kenya	Won by Kenya
2013	22 Jun	Uganda	13 – 8	Kenya	Won by Uganda
2013	15 Jun	Kenya	18 – 17	Uganda	Won by Uganda
2012	28 April	Kenya	15 – 3	Uganda	Won by Kenya
2012	21 April	Uganda	15 – 6	Kenya	Won by Kenya
2011	16 Jul	Uganda	29 – 10	Kenya	Won on aggregate by Kenya
2011	9 Jul	Kenya	22 – 10	Uganda	Won on aggregate by Kenya
2010	10 Jul	Kenya	16 – 8	Uganda	Won on aggregate by Kenya
2010	3 Jul	Uganda	8 – 5	Kenya	Won on aggregate by Kenya
2010	22 May	Uganda	0 – 10	Kenya	Non-Elgon Cup match.
2010	22 May	Kenya	8 – 0	Uganda	Non-Elgon Cup match.
2009	29 Aug	Uganda	12 – 5	Kenya	Won on aggregate by Kenya
2009	15 Aug	Kenya	38 – 5	Uganda	Won on aggregate by Kenya
2008	16 Aug	Kenya	15 – 13	Uganda	Shared, retained by Uganda
2008	24 May	Uganda	18 – 17	Kenya	Shared, retained by Uganda
2007	Tournament cancelled
2006	12 Aug	Kenya	0 – 3	Uganda	First won by Uganda
2006	13 May	Uganda	24 – 0	Kenya	First won by Uganda
2005			–
2004			–
2003			–
2002			–
2001			–
2000			–
1999			–
1998			–
1997			–
1996			–
1995			–

== Notes ==
a. The RFUK was dissolved in 1953 with the formation of the Rugby Football Union of East Africa (RFUEA); the current Kenya Rugby Football Union (KRFU) was not formed until 1970.
