= Rugigana Evariste =

Rwandan economist and politician

- Born: 17 April 1982 (age 44); Mbarara, Uganda
- Education: Makerere University (Bachelor's degree in economics); National Graduate Institute for Policy Studies (Master's degree in economics)
- Occupations: Economist, project planning and management
- Title: Director General RURA
- Predecessor: Pascal Emile Baganizi

Rugigana Evariste (born April 17, 1982) is a Rwandan economist and politician.

Since September 3, 2023, Evariste is the Director General of Rwanda Utilities Regulatory Authority (RURA).

Mandated by Rwandan Law N° 09/2013 of 01/03/2013 he oversees the regulation of public utilities. This involves establishing guidelines for implementing existing laws and regulations and ensuring compliance by public utilities with the provisions of law and regulations governing the regulated sectors in an objective, transparent and non-discriminatory manner.

Before his current role, he served as Director of Rwanda Cabinet at the Office of the Prime Minister under Edouard Ngirente from April 2018 to September 2023.

== Early life and education ==
Evariste was born April 17, 1982 in Mbarara, Western region of Uganda.

After attending primary school locally, Evariste joined and attained High School Diploma from Makerere High school, Kampala. He was then admitted to Makerere University, Uganda in 2003 and graduated 3 years later in 2006 with a bachelor's degree in Economics.

In 2011, Evariste enrolled for a post graduate diploma in Project Planning and Management from Maastricht School of Management, Netherlands, and graduated in same year.

In 2013, he further attained a master's degree in economics from National Graduate Institute for Policy Studies, Tokyo, Japan. A research graduate school located in Minato, Tokyo; an international premier policy school and one of Asia's leading think tanks of policy scholars and social scientists focused on policy studies.

== Career ==
Evariste commenced his career as an assistant lecturer at University of Rwanda in 2007. In 2009 he transitioned to the role of a tax revenue officer at Rwanda Revenue Authority until 2010.

Subsequently in 2010, Evariste assumed the position of Economic Policy Analyst in Rwandan office of the Prime Minister under Bernard Makuza until October 2013.

He was later appointed by Rwanda Cabinet meeting in 2014 to work as an economic advisor to the Prime Minister initially under Pierre Damien Habumuremyi and later under Anastase Murekezi until June 2016.

From June 2016 to May 2017, Evariste assumed the role of Rwanda’s Country Representative for East Africa Trade and Investment Hub, a US government flagship project (2014–2019) under the presidential Trade Africa initiative. This initiative aimed to increase U.S-Africa trade and investment, regional integration, and competitiveness.

In 2017, Evariste returned to the Office of Prime Minister, where he served as a senior Economic Advisor. Subsequently in April 2018, President Paul Kagame appointed him as Director of Rwanda Cabinet Affairs in the Office of the Prime Minister under Edouard Ngirente, a position he held until September 2023.

On September 3, 2023, President Paul Kagame appointed Evariste as the Director General of Rwanda Utilities Regulatory Authority (RURA), a widely recognized Rwandan government's regulatory agency overseeing ICT, Postal services, Energy, Water, Sanitation, Transport, and Radiation Protection.
