= Energy Regulators Regional Association =

Logo of the Energy Regulators Regional Association

The Energy Regulators Regional Association (ERRA) is a voluntary organization of independent energy regulatory bodies primarily from the Central European and Eurasian region, with Affiliates from Africa, Asia the Middle East and the US.

== Purpose and objectives ==
The purpose and objectives of the association are:

- To improve national energy regulation in member countries;
- To foster development of stable energy regulators with autonomy and authority;
- To improve cooperation among energy regulators;
- To facilitate the exchange of information, research, training and experience among members and other regulators around the world.

== History ==
The first energy regulatory bodies of the ERRA region were established in the mid-1990s as an essential part of restructuring and reforms taking place in these countries. ERRA began as a cooperative initiative of 12 energy regulatory bodies. They were then supported from 1999 to 2008 by the US National Association of Regulatory Utility Commissioners (NARUC), which, with the participation of USAID, arranged technical forums, meetings and study tours for mutual training and development. As a consequence, fifteen energy regulators established ERRA on 11 December 2000 in Bucharest. The association was registered in Hungary in April 2001 and its secretariat is based in Budapest. To date ERRA lists 23 full and 14 associate members.

== Members ==
=== Current full members ===
- Albanian Energy Regulator *
- Public Services Regulatory Commission of Armenia *
- Tariff (Price) Council of Azerbaijan (joined in 2007)
- State Electricity Regulatory Commission of Bosnia and Herzegovina (joined in 2004)
- Energy and Water Regulatory Commission of Bulgaria *
- Croatian Energy Regulatory Agency (joined in 2002)
- Estonian Competition Authority *
- Georgian National Energy and Water Supply Regulatory Commission *
- Hungarian Energy and Public Utility Regulatory Authority *
- Committee for Regulation of Natural Monopolies and Protection of Competition at the Ministry of National Economy of Kazakhstan *
- State Agency for Fuel and Energy Complex Regulation under the Government of the Kyrgyz Republic *
- Public Utilities Commission of Latvia *
- National Commission for Energy Control and Prices of Lithuania *
- Nigerian Electricity Regulatory Commission (NERC)
- Energy Regulatory Commission of Macedonia (joined in 2004)
- National Energy Regulatory Agency of Moldova *
- Energy Regulatory Commission of Mongolia (joined in 2001)
- Energy Regulatory Office of Poland *
- Romanian Energy Regulatory Authority *
- Federal Tariff Service of the Russian Federation *
- Energy Agency of Serbia (joined in 2006)
- Regulatory Office for Network Industries of Slovakia *
- Energy Market Regulatory Authority of Turkey (joined in 2002)
- National Energy and Utilities Regulatory Commission of Ukraine *

(Founding Members are marked with * above.)

=== Current associate members ===
- Regulatory Commission for Energy in Federation of Bosnia and Herzegovina (joined in 2010)
- Regulatory Commission for Energy of Republika Srpska, Bosnia and Herzegovina (joined in 2010)
- Electricity Sector Regulatory Agency of Cameroon (joined in 2013)
- ERERA: ECOWAS (Economic Community of West African States) Regional Electricity Regulatory Authority (joined in 2011)
- Public Utilities Regulatory Commission of Ghana (joined in 2015)
- Energy and Mineral Regulatory Commission of Jordan (joined in 2007)
- Nigerian Electricity Regulatory Commission (joined in 2010)
- Authority for Electricity Regulation of Oman (joined in 2015)
- National Electric Power Regulatory Authority of Pakistan (joined in 2015)
- Regional Energy Commission of Moscow City, Russian Federation (joined in 2013)
- Electricity and Co-Generation Regulatory Authority of Saudi Arabia (joined in 2008)
- Regulatory and Supervisory Bureau for Electricity and Water of Dubai, UAE (joined in 2015)
- Energy Regulatory Office of UNMIK (joined in 2005)
- National Association of Regulatory Utility Commissioners, USA (joined in 2001)

== Languages ==
ERRA activities are conducted in both English and Russian.
