= Rugby World Cup qualification =

Process for determining teams who qualify

Rugby World Cup qualification is a process that determines which nations will compete at the Rugby World Cup, a men's rugby union competition.

Unlike previous tournaments (where eight teams, the quarter-finalists from the preceding World Cup, qualified automatically and twelve places were available through qualification) the 2011 World Cup would be the first to be contested by twelve automatic qualifiers / seeds (the teams who finished in the top three of the groups at the 2007 World Cup) and eight qualifiers; this format has been retained for future tournaments.

The qualification system for the remaining eight places will be region-based with Europe and the Americas allocated two qualifying places, Africa, Asia and Oceania one place each, with the last place determined by a play-off.

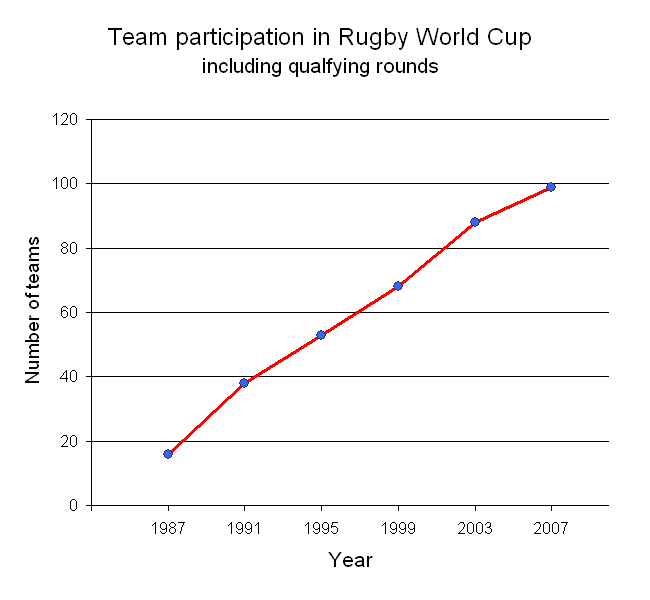
Team participation in Rugby World Cup (including qualifying rounds)

== History ==
The first Rugby World Cup, the tournament of 1987 held no qualifying tournament. Instead, all the then members of the International Rugby Board (then, IFRB) were automatically included in the competition. These members accounted for seven of the 16 available positions. The remaining positions were filled by invitation.

The next tournament, the 1991 Rugby World Cup implemented a qualifying process. Eight of the 16 available positions were filled by nations automatically, however, the remaining positions would be determined by a 25 nation qualifying tournament. The following tournament, the 1995 Rugby World Cup, increased the qualifying tournament to 43 nations. In addition to the eight previous quarterfinalists, hosts South Africa were granted automatic entry.

The approach changed again for the 1999 Rugby World Cup, as only the hosts and the defending champions, the runners-up, the third place play-off winners from the 1995 cup were to gain automatic entry, as opposed to the elite eight nations. The 1999 world cup also saw the introduction of a repechage, a second chance for teams that had finished runners-up in each qualifying zone. Again, the number of nations participating in the qualifying events increased, from 43 to 63.

81 teams entered qualifying for the 2003 Rugby World Cup. The eight quarter-finalists from the previous world cup gained automatic qualification with another twelve berths open to qualifiers. Teams from five continents, Africa, Asia, Oceania, Europe and the Americas gained entry to the competition. Qualification came through a mixture of round robin tournaments, knockout and repechage.

A similar mixture of round robin tournaments, knockout and repechage was used for the qualification for the 2007 Rugby World Cup involving 86 teams, which together with the 8 teams which have qualified automatically brought to 94 the total number of teams participating in the 2007 tournament.

In addition to the eight quarterfinalists at the 2007 Rugby World Cup, the four teams finishing in third place in their respective pools qualified automatically for the 2011 Rugby World Cup. Various existing regional tournaments were incorporated into the qualification process for the remaining eight berths. Including teams that failed to qualify for official qualifying tournaments, 88 teams participated in the qualification process, bringing the total number of teams participating in the 2011 tournament to 100.

A total of nine teams to go through qualifying have done so with a 100% records. Of these four (Scotland, England, Australia and Wales) only faced qualifying once, and one (Ireland) had to qualify twice. Three of the others (Japan, Argentina and Italy) all held regional dominance. The ninth of the teams with 100% records, Samoa, has had more challenging routes to maintain their 100% qualifying record.

== Qualification competition entrants over time ==
Number of teams entering qualification (including automatic qualifiers)
Continental zone	1987 (Australia) (New Zealand)	1991 (United Kingdom) (Republic of Ireland) (France)	1995 (South Africa)	1999 (Wales)	2003 (Australia)	2007 (France)	2011 (New Zealand)	2015 (England)	2019 (Japan)	2023 (France)	2027 (Australia)
Total berths in the World Cup	16	16	16	20	20	20	20	20	20	20	24
Africa	1	4	12	11	13	15	15	14	15	14	16
Americas	3	3	7	12	18	19	19	19	21	7	8
Asia	1	7	8	8	11	13	11	17	12	4	8
Oceania	4	7	5	8	11	11	9	9	7	10	4
Europe	7	19	24	32	36	36	37	37	38	12	8
Total entrants	16^{1}	33	56	71	89	94	91	96	93	47	44

- ^{1} There was no qualifying process to the 1987 World Cup. The at the time eight IRFB members (minus South Africa boycotted because of apartheid) were joined by nine invited nations.

== Qualification berths by continent ==
berths allocated by continent (not including automatic qualifiers)
Continental zone	1987 (Australia) (New Zealand)	1991 (United Kingdom) (Republic of Ireland) (France)	1995 (South Africa)	1999 (Wales)	2003 (Australia)	2007 (France)	2011 (New Zealand)	2015 (England)	2019 (Japan)	2023 (France)	2027 (Australia)
Total berths in the World Cup	16	16	16	20	20	20	20	20	20	20	24
Africa	0	1	1	1	1	1	1	1	1	1	1
Americas	0	3	1	3+R^{3}	2+R	3	2	2+R	2+R	2	1+P
Asia	0	2	1	1	1	1	1	1	0	0	1
Oceania	0	2	1	3+R	2+R	2+R	1	1	2+P^{4}	1+P^{4}	3+R
Europe	0	2	3	6	4	3+R	2+R	2	1	2+R	4
Total excluding automatic qualifiers	0^{2}	8	7	16	12	12	8	8	8	8	12

- ^{2} There was no qualifying process to the 1987 World Cup; all teams were invited, and, therefore, automatically qualified.
- ^{3} A+R indicates that one of the teams of this continent qualified to the World Cup through the repechage (called Final Qualification Tournament for the 2023 Rugby World Cup).
- ^{4} A+P indicates that one of the teams of this continent qualified to the World Cup through the 2019 Rugby World Cup – play-off qualifications or through the 2023 Rugby World Cup – Asia/Pacific play-off.

== First appearance in qualification by team ==
World Cup	Africa	Americas	Asia	Europe	Oceania	Total
1991 (United Kingdom) (Republic of Ireland) (France)	Ivory Coast^{13} Morocco; Tunisia; Zimbabwe^{13}	Argentina^{13} Canada^{13} United States^{13}	Japan^{13} South Korea	Belgium; Czechoslovakia; Denmark; Israel; Italy^{13} Netherlands; Poland; Portugal^{13} Romania^{13} Spain^{13} Sweden; Switzerland; West Germany; Yugoslavia	Samoa^{13} Tonga^{13}	25
1995 (South Africa)	Kenya; Namibia^{13}	Bermuda; Chile^{13} Paraguay; Uruguay^{13}	Arabian Gulf^{4} Hong Kong^{13} Malaysia; Singapore; Sri Lanka; Taiwan; Thailand	Andorra; Czech Republic^{5} Georgia^{13} Germany^{6} Hungary; Latvia; Lithuania; Luxembourg; Russia^{13} Wales^{13}	Fiji^{13}	24
1999 (Wales)	Botswana; Zambia	Bahamas; Barbados; Brazil; Guyana^{7} Trinidad and Tobago	Chinese Taipei^{8}	Austria; Bulgaria; Croatia; England^{13} Ireland^{13} Moldova; Norway; Scotland^{13} Ukraine; FR Yugoslavia^{9}	Australia^{13} Cook Islands; Papua New Guinea; Tahiti	22
2003 (Australia)	Cameroon; Madagascar; Swaziland; Uganda	Cayman Islands; Colombia; Jamaica; Peru; Saint Lucia; Venezuela	Kazakhstan	Bosnia and Herzegovina; Malta; Monaco; Slovenia	Niue; Solomon Islands; Vanuatu	18
2007 (France)	Nigeria; Senegal	Saint Vincent and the Grenadines	Guam	Finland; Serbia^{10}	none	6
2011 (New Zealand)	none	Mexico	India; Pakistan	Armenia; Greece	none	5
2015 (England)	Mauritius	none	China; Indonesia; Iran; Philippines; United Arab Emirates^{11}	Cyprus^{12}	none	7
2019 (Japan)	none	Ecuador; Guatemala	Uzbekistan	Estonia	none	4
2023 (France)	Algeria; Burkina Faso; Burundi; Ghana	none	none	none	none	4
2027 (Australia)	none	Costa Rica	none	none	none	1
Total	19	23	20	44	10	116

Teams marked in italics had appeared in a previous world cup (by invitation in 1987 and automatically thereafter). France, New Zealand, and South Africa have never needed to take part in the qualifying tournaments, having been invited to their first tournament and always qualifying automatically thereafter.

- ^{4} Took part in the African qualifying tournament.
- ^{5} First appearance as Czech Republic; previous appearance as Czechoslovakia.
- ^{6} First appearance as Germany; previous appearance as West Germany.
- ^{7} Withdrew prior to the competition. Actually took part in the 2003 qualifying tournament.
- ^{8} First appearance as Chinese Taipei; previous appearance as Taiwan.
- ^{9} First appearance as Federal Republic of Yugoslavia; previous appearances as Socialist Federal Republic of Yugoslavia.
- ^{10} First appearance as Serbia; previous appearances as Federal Republic of Yugoslavia and Socialist Federal Republic of Yugoslavia.
- ^{11} First appearance as United Arab Emirates. Previously competed as part of Arabian Gulf
- ^{12} Although Cyprus were originally included in the qualifying process, they were later removed as they were not full member of the IRB.
- ^{13} Team who qualified for a Rugby World Cup.

== Qualification by continent ==
=== Africa ===
Tournament	Automatically qualified	Qualified via competition	Eliminated in repechage
1987	Zimbabwe	–	–
1991	–	Zimbabwe	–
1995	South Africa	Ivory Coast	–
1999	South Africa	Namibia	Morocco
2003	South Africa	Namibia	Tunisia
2007	South Africa	Namibia	Morocco
2011	South Africa	Namibia	Tunisia
2015	South Africa	Namibia	Zimbabwe
2019	South Africa	Namibia	Kenya
2023	South Africa	Namibia	Kenya
2027	South Africa	Zimbabwe	Namibia

=== Americas ===
Tournament	Automatically qualified	Qualified via competition	Eliminated in repechage
1987	Argentina; Canada; United States	–	–
1991	–	Argentina; Canada; United States	–
1995	Canada	Argentina	–
1999	–	Argentina; Canada; United States; Uruguay	–
2003	Argentina	Canada; United States; Uruguay	–
2007	–	Argentina; Canada; United States	Uruguay
2011	Argentina	Canada; United States	Uruguay
2015	Argentina	Canada; United States; Uruguay	–
2019	Argentina	Canada; United States; Uruguay	–
2023	Argentina	Chile; Uruguay	United States
2027	Argentina	Chile; Uruguay	Brazil

=== Asia ===
Tournament	Automatically qualified	Qualified via competition	Eliminated in repechage
1987	Japan	–	–
1991	–	Japan	–
1995	–	Japan	–
1999	–	Japan	South Korea
2003	–	Japan	South Korea
2007	–	Japan	South Korea
2011	–	Japan	Kazakhstan
2015	–	Japan	Hong Kong
2019	Japan	–	Hong Kong
2023	Japan	–	Hong Kong
2027	Japan	Hong Kong	United Arab Emirates

=== Europe ===
Tournament	Automatically qualified	Qualified via competition	Eliminated in repechage
1987	England; France; Ireland; Italy; Romania; Scotland; Wales	–	–
1991	England; France; Ireland; Scotland; Wales	Italy; Romania	–
1995	England; France; Ireland; Scotland	Italy; Romania; Wales	–
1999	France; Wales	England; Ireland; Italy; Romania; Scotland; Spain	Georgia; Netherlands; Portugal
2003	England; France; Scotland; Wales	Georgia; Ireland; Italy; Romania	Spain
2007	England; France; Ireland; Scotland; Wales	Georgia; Italy; Portugal; Romania	–
2011	England; France; Ireland; Italy; Scotland; Wales	Georgia; Romania; Russia	–
2015	England; France; Ireland; Italy; Scotland; Wales	Georgia; Romania	Russia
2019	England; France; Georgia; Ireland; Italy; Scotland; Wales	Russia	Germany
2023	England; France; Ireland; Italy; Scotland; Wales	Georgia; Portugal; Romania	–
2027	England; France; Ireland; Italy; Scotland; Wales	Georgia; Portugal; Romania; Spain	Belgium

=== Oceania ===
Tournament	Automatically qualified	Qualified via competition	Eliminated in repechage
1987	Australia; Fiji; New Zealand; Tonga	–	–
1991	Australia; Fiji; New Zealand	Western Samoa	–
1995	Australia; New Zealand; Western Samoa	Tonga	–
1999	New Zealand	Australia; Fiji; Samoa; Tonga	–
2003	Australia; New Zealand	Fiji; Samoa; Tonga	–
2007	Australia; New Zealand	Fiji; Samoa; Tonga	–
2011	Australia; Fiji; New Zealand; Tonga	Samoa	–
2015	Australia; New Zealand; Samoa; Tonga	Fiji	–
2019	Australia; New Zealand	Fiji; Samoa; Tonga	Cook Islands
2023	Australia; Fiji; New Zealand	Samoa; Tonga	–
2027	Australia; Fiji; New Zealand	Canada; Tonga; United States; Samoa	

== Repechage results ==
The repechage, a second chance for teams that had finished runners-up in each qualifying zone, has been a feature of qualifying since it was introduced during qualifying for the 1999 Rugby World Cup. The following table shows which teams have participated in the repechage – both the teams that have qualified via the repechage, and the teams that have failed to qualify via the repechage.

Repechage results by country
RWC Qualifying	Qualified through repechage	Score	Eliminated at final stage of repechage	Eliminated at preliminary stage of repechage
1999	Tonga	140–41*	South Korea	Georgia; Portugal; Netherlands
1999	Uruguay	36–24*	Morocco	Georgia; Portugal; Netherlands
2003	United States	120–26*	Spain	Tunisia
2003	Tonga	194–0*	South Korea	Tunisia
2007	Portugal	24–23*	Uruguay	Morocco
2007	Tonga	85–3	South Korea	Morocco
2011	Romania	60–33*	Uruguay	Kazakhstan; Tunisia
2015	Uruguay	57–49*	Russia	Hong Kong; Zimbabwe
2019	Canada	round robin	Germany	Cook Islands
2019	Canada	round robin	Hong Kong	Cook Islands
2019	Canada	round robin	Kenya	Cook Islands
2023	Portugal	round robin	United States	–
2023	Portugal	round robin	Hong Kong	–
2023	Portugal	round robin	Kenya	–
2027	Samoa	round robin	Belgium	United Arab Emirates
2027	Samoa	round robin	Brazil	United Arab Emirates
2027	Samoa	round robin	Namibia	United Arab Emirates

Note: All scores marked with an asterisk (*) are aggregate scores over two legs.

Repechage results by continent
RWC Qualifying	Oceania	Americas	Europe	Asia	Africa
1999	1–0	1–0	0–3	0–1	0–1
2003	1–0	1–0	0–1	0–1	0–1
2007	1–0	0–1	1–0	0–1	0–1
2011	–	0–1	1–0	0–1	0–1
2015	–	1–0	0–1	0–1	0–1
2019	0–1	1–0	0–1	0–1	0–1
2023	–	0–1	1–0	0–1	0–1
2027	1–0	–	0–1	0–1	0–1
Total: 1999–2027	4–1 (80%)	4–3 (57%)	3–7 (30%)	0–8 (0%)	0–8 (0%)

== See also ==
- National team appearances in the Rugby World Cup
