= 2005 Oceania Cup =

- Date: 2 June– 26 October 2005
- Countries: Cook Islands; Niue; Tahiti; Papua New Guinea; Solomon Islands; Vanuatu

Final positions
- Champions: Cook Islands
- Runner-up: Papua New Guinea

Tournament statistics
- Matches played: 8

The 2005 Oceania Cup was an international rugby union competition for countries and territories from Oceania with national teams in the developmental band. It was run by the Federation of Oceania Rugby Unions, which is the administrative body for rugby in the Oceania region.

The tournament, won by the Cook Islands, also served as the first two rounds of the Oceania qualification for 2007 Rugby World Cup.

== First round ==
=== Pool A ===
Rank	Team	W	D	L	PF	PA	PD	Pts	
1	Papua New Guinea	2	0	0	142	10	+132	6	Qualified for final
2	Solomon Islands	1	0	1	27	57	–30	4	
3	Vanuatu	0	0	2	15	117	–102	0	

29 July 2005

Vanuatu	12 - 20	Solomon Islands

Port Vila

13 August 2005

Solomon Islands	7 - 45	Papua New Guinea

Honiara

20 August 2005

Papua New Guinea	97 - 3	Vanuatu

Port Moresby

=== Pool B ===
Rank	Team	W	D	L	PF	PA	PD	Pts	
1	Cook Islands	2	0	0	71	27	+44	6	Qualified for final
2	Niue	1	0	1	60	32	+28	5	
3	Tahiti	0	0	2	30	102	–72	0	

23 July 2005

Niue	55 - 8	Tahiti

Alofi

30 July 2005

Tahiti	22 - 47	Cook Islands

Papeete

6 August 2005

Cook Islands	24 - 5	Niue

Rarotonga

== Finals ==
3 September 2005

Cook Islands	37 - 12	Papua New Guinea

Rarotonga

10 September 2005

Papua New Guinea	20 - 11	Cook Islands

Port Moresby

Cook Islands won on aggregate (48-32) and was also admitted to Round four of Oceania qualification for 2007 RWC.

== See also ==
- FORU Oceania Cup
