= 2007 FORU Oceania Cup =

2007 Oceania Cup
- Date: 8 December 2007– 22 April 2008
- Countries: Niue; Tahiti; Papua New Guinea; Solomon Islands; Vanuatu

Final positions
- Champions: Papua New Guinea
- Runner-up: Niue

Tournament statistics
- Matches played: 5

The 2007 FORU Oceania Cup was a rugby union competition for countries and territories in Oceania with national teams in the developmental band.

The tournament was won by Papua New Guinea.

== First round ==
=== Western Zone ===
8 December 2007

Vanuatu	18 - 5	Solomon Islands

Port Vila

12 December 2007

Papua New Guinea	49 - 9	Solomon Islands

Port Vila

12 December 2007

Papua New Guinea	46 - 0	Vanuatu

Port Vila

Ranking:

- 1. Papua New Guinea qualified for final
- 2. Vanuatu
- 3. Solomon Islands

=== Eastern Zone ===
11 October 2007

Tahiti	14 - 51	Niue

Papeete

Ranking:

- 1. Niue qualified for final
- 2. Tahiti

== Final ==
22 April 2008

Niue	27 - 46	Papua New Guinea

Paliati

== See also ==
- FORU Oceania Cup
