= 2021 Oceania Rugby Cup =

Rugby Tournament

2021 Oceania Cup
Tournament details
- Host: Papua New Guinea
- Date: Cancelled
- Countries: Cook Islands; Niue; Papua New Guinea; Solomon Islands; Tahiti

Tournament statistics
- Matches played: 0

The 2021 Oceania Rugby Cup for national rugby union teams in the Oceania region was set to be held in Papua New Guinea in June 2021.

The event was cancelled on 30 April 2021 as a result of the coronavirus pandemic in Papua New Guinea. Since the outcome would have determined which side would move on to the third round of Oceania qualification for the 2023 Rugby World Cup, Cook Islands was chosen to progress due to their higher position in the World Rugby Rankings at the time.

== Standings ==
Pos	Team	Pld	W	D	L	PF	PA	+/–	Pts
1	Cook Islands	0	0	0	0	0	0	0	0
2	Niue	0	0	0	0	0	0	0	0
3	Papua New Guinea	0	0	0	0	0	0	0	0
4	Solomon Islands	0	0	0	0	0	0	0	0
5	Tahiti	0	0	0	0	0	0	0	0

Points breakdown:
4 points for a win
2 points for a draw

== See also ==
- Oceania Rugby Cup
