= 2006 FORU Oceania Cup =

2006 FORU Cup
- Date: 14 October 2006– 21 October 2006
- Countries: Cook Islands; New Caledonia; Niue; Tahiti; Vanuatu

Tournament statistics
- Matches played: 4

The 2006 FORU Cup was an international rugby union competition for countries and territories from Oceania with national teams in the developmental band. It was run by the Federation of Oceania Rugby Unions, which is the administrative body for rugby in the Oceania region.

Teams competing included Niue, Tahiti, Cook Islands, and Vanuatu. The final was never played.

== First round ==
=== Western Zone ===
14 October 2006

Vanuatu	22 - 0	New Caledonia
	Result

Port Vila

Ranking

- 1. Vanuatu Qualified for final
- 2. New Caledonia

=== Eastern Zone ===
14 October 2006

Niue	41-6	Tahiti
	Result

Growers Stadium Pukekohe

18 October 2006

Cook Islands	87–18	Tahiti
	Result

Growers Stadium Pukekohe

21 October 2006

Cook Islands	41–15	Niue
	Result

Growers Stadium Pukekohe

Ranking:

- 1. Cook Islands
- 2. Niue Qualified for final?
- 3. Tahiti

== See also ==
- FORU Oceania Cup
