= Rugby union at the 1983 South Pacific Games =

- Venue: Apia, Western Samoa
- Dates: September
- Nations: 11

Rugby union at the 1983 South Pacific Games, currently known as the Pacific Games, was hosted at Apia, the capital of Western Samoa in September 1983. Fiji beat the host nation Western Samoa by 18–10 in the final to win the gold medal.

== Medal summary ==
Event	Gold	Silver	Bronze
Men's rugby 15s	Fiji	Western Samoa	Tonga

== Teams ==
Competing teams were:

Pool A

- American Samoa
- Cook Islands
- Papua New Guinea
- Western Samoa
- Tonga
- Tokelau

Pool B

- Fiji
- New Caledonia
- Niue
- Solomon Islands
- Tahiti

== Group matches ==
=== Group A ===
Group A	September 1983	Western Samoa	55–0	American Samoa	Apia, Western Samoa

Group A	September 1983	Western Samoa	55–4	Cook Islands	Apia, Western Samoa

Group A	September 1983	Western Samoa	def.	Papua New Guinea	Apia, Western Samoa

Group A	September 1983	Western Samoa	def.	Tokelau	Apia, Western Samoa

Group A	September 1983	Western Samoa	def.	Tonga	Apia, Western Samoa

Group A	September 1983	Tonga	def.	American Samoa	Apia, Western Samoa

Group A	September 1983	Tonga	45–3	Cook Islands	Apia, Western Samoa

Group A	September 1983	Tonga	def.	Papua New Guinea	Apia, Western Samoa

Group A	September 1983	Tonga	def.	Tokelau	Apia, Western Samoa

Group A	September 1983	Papua New Guinea	28–15	Tokelau	Apia, Western Samoa

Note: Records for this tournament are incomplete.

Western Samoa and Tonga qualified for the finals.

=== Group B ===
Group B	September 1983	Fiji	104–6	New Caledonia	Apia, Western Samoa

Group B	September 1983	Fiji	124–4	Niue	Apia, Western Samoa
			Report

Group B	September 1983	Fiji	86–0	Solomon Islands	Apia, Western Samoa

Group B	September 1983	Fiji	102–9	Tahiti	Apia, Western Samoa

Group B	September 1983	Solomon Islands	19–12	Niue	Apia, Western Samoa

Note: Records for this tournament are incomplete.

Fiji and New Caledonia qualified for the finals.

=== Play-offs ===
Semifinal	September 1983	Fiji	38–10	Tonga	Apia, Western Samoa

Semifinal	September 1983	Western Samoa	def.	New Caledonia	Apia, Western Samoa

3rd-place	September 1983	Tonga	70–0	New Caledonia	Apia, Western Samoa

Final	September 1983	Fiji	18–10	Western Samoa	Apia, Western Samoa

== See also ==
- Rugby union at the Pacific Games
