= 2007 Rugby World Cup – Oceania qualification =

In qualification for the 2007 Rugby World Cup, there were two places available for Oceania teams, and one place in the repechage. In the group rounds, there were three points awarded for a win, two for a draw, and one for a loss. There were no bonus points awarded.

== Qualification process ==
=== Round 1 and 2 ===
These rounds corresponded to the 2005 FORU Oceania Cup, played by the six lowest tier teams of Oceania. Teames were divided in two pools: Pool A, with three teams from the Oceania East region, and Pool B with three teams from the Oceania West region. The winner of each group qualified for the finals (Round 2), a playoff home and away. The winner advanced to Round 4.

=== Round 3 ===
A round robin league between Tonga, Samoa and Fiji. Winner qualified directly to RWC 2007 as Oceania 1, Runner Up as Oceania 2, and third place advanced to Round 4.

=== Round 4 ===
Winner of Round 2 vs 3rd placed team from Round 3. Winner progressed to Repechage round as "Oceania 3", to meet "Asia 2".

== Round 1 ==
=== Pool A ===
Papua New Guinea won the pool and advanced to Round 2.

Final Standings

Country	GP	W	D	L	+/-	Pts
Papua New Guinea	2	2	0	0	132	6
Vanuatu	2	1	0	1	-86	4
Solomon Islands	2	0	0	2	-46	2

Date	Match	Venue	Result
29-Jul-2005	Vanuatu - Solomon Islands	Solomon Islands	20–12
13-Aug-2005	Solomon Islands - Papua New Guinea	Solomon Islands	7-45
20-Aug-2005	Papua New Guinea - Vanuatu	Papua New Guinea	97–3

=== Pool B ===
Cook Islands won the pool and advanced to Round 2.

Final Standings

Country	GP	W	D	L	+/-	Pts
Cook Islands	2	2	0	0	44	6
Niue	2	1	0	1	28	4
Tahiti	2	0	0	2	-72	2

Date	Match	Venue	Result
22-Jul-2005	Niue - Tahiti	Niue	55–8
30-Jul-2005	Tahiti - Cook Islands	Tahiti	22–47
06-Aug-2005	Cook Islands - Niue	Cook Islands	24–5

== Round 2 ==
The teams split the series, with Cook Islands winning on aggregate score to advance to Round 4.

Date	Match	Venue	Result
03-Sep-2005	Cook Islands - Papua New Guinea	Cook Islands	37–12
10-Sep-2005	Papua New Guinea - Cook Islands	Papua New Guinea	20–11

Cook Islands won 48–32 on aggregate

== Round 3 ==
Samoa and Fiji qualified for RWC 2007 as Oceania 1 & 2, Tonga progressed to Round 4.

Final Standings

Country	GP	W	D	L	+/-	Pts
Samoa	4	3	0	1	55	10
Fiji	4	3	0	1	-9	10
Tonga	4	0	0	4	-46	4

Date	Match	Venue	Result
25-Jun-2005	Fiji - Tonga	Fiji	19–11
02-Jul-2005	Samoa - Tonga	Samoa	50–28
09-Jul-2005	Fiji - Samoa	Fiji	10–38
16-Jul-2005	Tonga - Fiji	Tonga	19–24
23-Jul-2005	Tonga - Samoa	Tonga	19–30
30-Jul-2005	Fiji - Samoa	Fiji	21–15

== Round 4 ==
Tonga swept the series and advanced to Repechage Round as Oceania 3, to meet Asia 2, South Korea.

Date	Match	Venue	Result
23-Jun-2006	Cook Islands - Tonga	Rarotonga, Cook Islands	10–77
8-Jul-2006	Tonga - Cook Islands	Tonga	90–0

Tonga won 167–10 on aggregate
