= 2015 Rugby World Cup – Oceania qualification =

Rugby Union

The Federation of Oceania Rugby Unions (FORU) section of the 2015 Rugby World Cup qualification involved five teams competing for one spot in the final tournament in England.

== Format ==
In addition to four automatically qualified teams, Oceania was allocated one direct qualifying place (Oceania 1) for the 2015 Rugby World Cup to be held in England. It was the last region to begin its qualification process for 2015. The 2013 FORU Oceania Cup was the regional qualification tournament, with the winner playing Fiji in a one-off match for the qualifying place. The winner of this play-off qualified directly for Pool A of the 2015 Rugby World Cup as Oceania 1.

== Entrants ==
The 2015 Rugby World Cup qualifying teams that competed for the 2015 Rugby World Cup – Oceania qualification. (World rankings, shown in brackets, are those immediately prior to first Oceania qualification match on 6 July 2012)

- Cook Islands (54)
- Fiji (14)
- Papua New Guinea (49)
- Solomon Islands (70)
- Tahiti (86)

=== Qualified nations ===
- Australia (Automatic qualifier)
- New Zealand (Automatic qualifier)
- Samoa (Automatic qualifier)
- Tonga (Automatic qualifier)
- Fiji (Oceania 1)

== Round 1: Oceania Cup ==
The first round consisted of six home-and-away matches. The winner of the series proceeded to the second round. The FORU Oceania Cup took place in Papua New Guinea at the Lloyd Robson Oval in Port Moresby from 6 to 13 July.

Pos	Team	Pld	W	D	L	PF	PA	+/–	BP	Pts
1	Cook Islands	3	3	0	0	114	48	+66	3	15
2	Papua New Guinea	3	2	0	1	99	91	+8	4	12
3	Solomon Islands	3	1	0	2	57	90	–33	1	5
4	Tahiti	3	0	0	3	59	100	–41	3	3
Updated: 13 July 2013; Source: oceaniarugby.com • The top team (Green background) advanced to Round 2

Matches

6 July 2013
13:00 AEST (UTC+10)

(1 BP) Cook Islands	38–5	Tahiti
	Stats

Lloyd Robson Oval, Port Moresby
Attendance: 4,000
Referee: Sam Tuidraki (Fiji)

6 July 2013
15:15 AEST (UTC+10)

(1 BP) Papua New Guinea	29–22	Solomon Islands (1 BP)
	Stats

Lloyd Robson Oval, Port Moresby
Attendance: 6,000
Referee: Kaveni Talemaivalagi (Fiji)

9 July 2013
13:00 AEST (UTC+10)

Solomon Islands	12–39	Cook Islands (1 BP)
	Stats

Lloyd Robson Oval, Port Moresby
Attendance: 1,000
Referee: Kaveni Talemaivalagi (Fiji)

9 July 2013
15:15 AEST (UTC+10)

(1 BP) Papua New Guinea	39–32	Tahiti (2 BP)
	Stats

Lloyd Robson Oval, Port Moresby
Attendance: 3,000
Referee: James Bolabiu (Fiji)

13 July 2013
13:00 AEST (UTC+10)

Solomon Islands	23–22	Tahiti (1 BP)
	Stats

Lloyd Robson Oval, Port Moresby
Attendance: 3,000
Referee: James Bolabiu (Fiji)

13 July 2013
15:15 AEST (UTC+10)

(2 BP) Papua New Guinea	31–37	Cook Islands (1 BP)
	Stats

Lloyd Robson Oval, Port Moresby
Attendance: 7,000
Referee: Sam Tuidraki (Fiji)

Overall Points Scorers
Player	Team	Total	Details			
Player	Team	Total	Tries	Conversions	Penalties	Drop Goals
Greg Mullany	Cook Islands	30	1	8	3	0
Marc Richmond	Tahiti	25	5	0	0	0
Alexandre Fournier	Tahiti	19	0	5	3	0
Ralph Susuve	Papua New Guinea	18	1	5	1	0
Leslie Puia	Solomon Islands	17	0	4	3	0
Ioane Ioane	Cook Islands	15	3	0	0	0
Louis Makuare	Cook Islands	15	3	0	0	0
Henry Liliket	Papua New Guinea	15	3	0	0	0
Fredson Pukefenua	Solomon Islands	15	3	0	0	0
Samuel Vaevae	Cook Islands	14	1	3	1	0
Francis Smith	Cook Islands	10	2	0	0	0
Douglas Guise	Papua New Guinea	10	2	0	0	0
Tisa Kautu	Papua New Guinea	10	2	0	0	0
Buttler Morris	Papua New Guinea	10	2	0	0	0
Hubert Tseraha	Papua New Guinea	10	2	0	0	0
Jonah Kautu Junior	Papua New Guinea	6	0	3	0	0
Brook Cowan	Cook Islands	5	1	0	0	0
Jacob Marsters	Cook Islands	5	1	0	0	0
Junior Napara	Cook Islands	5	1	0	0	0
Chay Raui	Cook Islands	5	1	0	0	0
Nathan Robinson	Cook Islands	5	1	0	0	0
Royce Teinakore	Cook Islands	5	1	0	0	0
Robert Bulumaris	Papua New Guinea	5	1	0	0	0
Kapua Kapua	Papua New Guinea	5	1	0	0	0
Aaron Miai	Papua New Guinea	5	1	0	0	0
Jackson Pato Junior	Papua New Guinea	5	1	0	0	0
John Bakila	Solomon Islands	5	1	0	0	0
Corey Chapman	Solomon Islands	5	1	0	0	0
Viv Kelesi	Solomon Islands	5	1	0	0	0
Jimmy Maebata	Solomon Islands	5	1	0	0	0
Trevor Puia	Solomon Islands	5	1	0	0	0
Andoni Jimenez	Tahiti	5	1	0	0	0
Martin Taeae	Tahiti	5	1	0	0	0
Noel Teihoarii	Tahiti	5	1	0	0	0

Updated: 13 July 2013

== Round 2: Oceania final ==
Fiji defeated the first round winner, Cook Islands, in a one-off match to determine who qualified for the 2015 Rugby World Cup.

28 June 2014
15:00 FJT (UTC+12)

Fiji	108–6	Cook Islands
Try: Talebula (2) 1' m, 72' c Kenatale 28' c Tikoirotuma 30' c Nadolo (3) 32' m, 42' c, 52' c Votu 37' m Qera 49' m Delai (2) 60' c, 77' m Atalifo 65' c Matawalu (2) 68' c, 79' m Nagusa (2) 70' c, 80+4' m Waqaniburotu 75' c Con: Nadolo (3/6) 29', 31', 53'; Ralulu (7/10) 43', 61', 66', 69', 71', 73', 76'; Naikatini (0/1); Drop: Talebula (1/1) 63'	Stats	Pen: Vaevae (2/2) 5', 21'

Churchill Park, Lautoka
Attendance: 2760
Referee: Nick Briant (New Zealand)

Team details

FB	15	Metuisela Talebula
RW	14	Waisea Nayacalevu
OC	13	Asaeli Tikoirotuma	(substituted off) 66'
IC	12	Nemani Nadolo	(substituted off) 53'
LW	11	Watisoni Votu
FH	10	Jonetani Ralulu
SH	9	Nemia Kenatale	(substituted off) 40'
N8	8	Akapusi Qera (c)
OF	7	Malakai Ravulo	(substituted off) 70'
BF	6	Dominiko Waqaniburotu
RL	5	Apisai Naikatini
LL	4	Apisalome Ratuniyarawa	(substituted off) 40'
TP	3	Manasa Saulo	(substituted off) 56'
HK	2	Sunia Koto	(substituted off) 45'
LP	1	Campese Ma'afu	(substituted off) 45'
Replacements:
HK	16	Viliame Veikoso	(substituted in) 45'
PR	17	Jerry Yanuyanutawa	(substituted in) 45'
PR	18	Leroy Atalifo	(substituted in) 56'
LK	19	Rupeni Nasiga	(substituted in) 40'
LK	20	Leone Nakarawa	(substituted in) 70'
SH	21	Nikola Matawalu	(substituted in) 40'
CE	22	Adriu Delai	(substituted in) 53'
FB	23	Timoci Nagusa	(substituted in) 66'
Coach:
(New Zealand) John McKee

FB	15	Chay Raui	(substituted off) 61'
RW	14	James Iopu-Johnson
OC	13	Joel Rapana
IC	12	James Raea
LW	11	Ioane Ioane	(substituted off) 70'
FH	10	Sam Vaevae	(substituted off) 57'
SH	9	Daniel Devereaux	(substituted off) 50'
N8	8	Stephen Setephano
OF	7	Nick Connal
BF	6	Kima Iosua
RL	5	Simon Marcel
LL	4	Bon Maui	(substituted off) 69'
TP	3	Stan Wright (c)	(substituted off) 73'
HK	2	Francis Smith	(substituted off) 71'
LP	1	AJ Campbell	(substituted off) 53'
Replacements:
HK	16	Jacob Marsters	(substituted in) 69'
PR	17	Chris Iosua	(substituted in) 53'
PR	18	Mathew Mullany	(substituted in) 73'
LK	19	Iro Teariki	(substituted in) 71'
N8	20	Mark Ioane	(substituted in) 61'
SH	21	Andrew Putairi	(substituted in) 50'
FH	22	Reece Joyce	(substituted in) 57'
WG	23	Louis Makere	(substituted in) 70'
Coach:
(New Zealand) Barry George

Touch judges:
Shane McDermott (New Zealand)
Ed Martin (Australia)
