= Tuvalu national rugby union team =

Tuvalu
- Union: Tuvalu Rugby Union
- Most caps: Multiple players (3)
Team kit

First international
- Papua New Guinea 89 – 5 Nauru (Port Moresby, Papua New Guinea; 23 August 2019)

Largest win
- None

Largest defeat
- Papua New Guinea 89 – 5 Nauru (Port Moresby, Papua New Guinea; 23 August 2019); Niue 89 – 5 Nauru (Port Moresby, Papua New Guinea; 30 August 2019)

The Tuvalu national rugby union team is the national team of the third tier rugby union playing nation of Tuvalu. The team made its full international debut in the 2019 Oceania Cup. Rugby union in Tuvalu is administered by the Tuvalu Rugby Union.

Tuvalu has yet to qualify for the Rugby World Cup.

== Results ==
Note the winning team is given first.

=== 2019 Oceania Cup ===
- Papua New Guinea 89–5 Nauru
- Solomon Islands 61–7 Nauru
- Niue 89–5 Nauru

== Current squad ==
2019 Oceania Cup

- 1. Sherlock Denuga – Prop
- 2. Ashly Scott Dagan Kaierua – Hooker
- 3. Jake Debao – Prop
- 4. Abraham Eroni Itsimaera – Lock
- 5. Dunstall Harris – Lock
- 6. Johnson Scotty – Flanker
- 7. Fulton Hogan Amram – Flanker
- 8. Damon Ivorab Adeang – Number 8
- 9. Zacharias Detenamo – Scrum-half
- 10. Kristidas Merike -Fly-half
- 11. Elkodawn Dagiaro – Wing
- 12. Lloyd Mark Dero Vunipola – Centre
- 13. Romanus Hartman – Centre
- 14. Junior Agiangang – Wing
- 15. Rasmussen Dowabobo – Fullback
- 16. Dean Kepae – Substitute
- 17. Felix Kepae – Substitute
- 18. Zechariah Temaki – Substitute
- 19. Kane Solomon – Substitute
- 20. Denuga Vito – Substitute
- 21. Lockett Mau – Substitute
- 22. Myer Temaki – Substitute
- 23. Otto Adam – Substitute

== Sponsors ==
- (Australia) Team Spirit (technical sponsor)
- Nauru Airlines
- (Jamaica) Digicel
- (Australia) Australian Aid

== See also ==
- Rugby union in Tuvalu
