= 2019 Oceania Rugby Cup =

Copa Oceanía 2019

2019 Oceania Cup
Tournament details
- Host: Papua New Guinea
- Date: August 2019
- Countries: American Samoa; Papua New Guinea; Solomon Islands; Tahiti

Final positions
- Champions: Papua New Guinea
- Runner-up: Niue

Tournament statistics
- Matches played: 6

The 2019 Oceania Rugby Cup for national rugby union teams in the Oceania region was held in Papua New Guinea in August 2019. Papua New Guinea won the title by finishing on top of the table after completing the round-robin tournament undefeated.

== Standings ==
Pos	Team	Pld	W	D	L	PF	PA	+/–	Pts
1	Papua New Guinea	3	3	0	0	133	28	+105	12
2	Niue	3	2	0	1	118	51	+67	8
3	Solomon Islands	3	1	0	2	91	41	+50	4
4	Nauru	3	0	0	3	17	239	-225	0
Updated: 6 March 2021; Source:
Points breakdown: 4 points for a win 2 points for a draw

== Matches ==
23 August 2019	Papua New Guinea	89 - 5	Nauru	Port Moresby
12:00	Try: Wesley Vali (6); Freddy Rova (3); Tony Sipa (2); Ahulo Ottio; Lewis Modudula; Max Vali; Emil Latumahina; Con: Tisa Kautu (7)	Report	Try: Tyler Temaki

23 August 2019	Solomon Islands	17 - 19	Niue	Port Moresby
12:00	Try: Timo Sanga (2); Paul Tema; Con: Eddie Moeava (1)	Report	Try: Luke Gibb; Nicholas Laufoli; Shaun Atamu; Con: Shaun Atamu (2)

27 August 2019	Niue	10 - 29	Papua New Guinea	Port Moresby
12:00	Try: Randy Freddie; Con: David Pamatatau; Pen: Shaun Atamu	Report	Try: Emil Latumahina (2); Monty Diave; Wesley Vali; Arthur Clement; Con: Joanh Kautu Jnr (2)

27 August 2019	Nauru	7 - 61	Solomon Islands	Port Moresby
12:00	Try: Fulton Amran; Con: Rassmusen Dowabobo	Report	Try: Moses Singamoana (4); David Sa'omatangi; Paul Tema; Chris Saru; Timo Sanga; Jordie Tepuke; Moana Tepuke; Charlie Tenge; Con: Chris Saru; Timo Sanga; Moana Tepuke

31 August 2019	Niue	89 - 5	Nauru	Port Moresby
12:00	Try: Kegan Tuhega (3); Quinton Strickland (2); Shaun Atamu (2); Luke Gibb; George Pamatatau; Randy Freddie; Tonga Tongotongo; Lepau Feau; Tui Leatigaga; Togatule Kose; David Pamatatau; Con: Gavin Patuki (4); Shaun Atamu (3)	Report	Try: Dagan Kaierua

31 August 2019	Papua New Guinea	15 - 13	Solomon Islands	Port Moresby
12:00	Try: Freddy Rova; Emil Latumahina; Geti Raka	Report	Try: Jimmy Wysna; Eddie Moeava; Pen: Chris Saru

== See also ==
- Oceania Rugby Cup
