= List of international rugby union teams =

The following is a list of international rugby union teams:

== National teams – band classification ==
Starting in 2008, in addition to the existing tier system, the IRB introduced a four-band system of classification in which unions are classified based on "their development status and record on the international stage". The details of tiers and bands are in the next sections of this article.

== Rugby union national teams ==
=== High Performance ===
==== Tier 1 ====
- Argentina
- Australia
- England
- Fiji
- France
- Ireland
- Italy
- Japan
- New Zealand
- South Africa
- Scotland
- Wales

==== Tier 2 ====
- Canada
- Chile
- Georgia
- Namibia
- Portugal
- Romania
- Samoa
- Spain
- Tonga
- Uruguay
- United States

=== Developmental ===
==== Development One ====
- Belgium
- Brazil
- Germany
- Hong Kong
- Ivory Coast
- Kenya
- Netherlands
- Paraguay
- Russia
- Zimbabwe

==== Developmental — by region ====
European countries

- Andorra
- Austria
- Bosnia and Herzegovina
- Bulgaria
- Croatia
- Cyprus
- Czech Republic
- Denmark
- Finland
- Greece
- Hungary
- Latvia
- Lithuania
- Luxembourg
- Malta
- Moldova
- Monaco
- Montenegro
- Norway
- Poland
- Serbia
- Slovakia
- Slovenia
- Sweden
- Switzerland
- Ukraine
- Vatican City

North & South American countries

- Bahamas
- Barbados
- Bermuda
- British Virgin Islands
- Cayman Islands
- Colombia
- Costa Rica
- Guatemala
- Guyana
- Jamaica
- Mexico
- Panama
- Peru
- Saint Lucia
- Saint Vincent and the Grenadines
- Trinidad and Tobago
- Venezuela

African countries

- Algeria
- Botswana
- Burundi
- Burkina Faso
- Cameroon
- DR Congo
- Egypt
- Eswatini
- Ghana
- Lesotho
- Madagascar
- Mali
- Mauritius
- Morocco
- Nigeria
- Rwanda
- Senegal
- Tanzania
- Togo
- Tunisia
- Uganda
- Zambia

Asian countries

- Azerbaijan
- China
- Chinese Taipei
- India
- Iran
- Israel
- Jordan
- Kazakhstan
- Kyrgyzstan
- South Korea
- Laos
- Lebanon
- Mongolia
- Nepal
- Pakistan
- Qatar
- Syria
- Sri Lanka
- Thailand
- Turkey
- United Arab Emirates
- Uzbekistan

Oceanian countries

- American Samoa
- Brunei
- Cook Islands
- Guam
- Indonesia
- Malaysia
- Niue
- Papua New Guinea
- Philippines
- Singapore
- Solomon Islands
- Vanuatu
- Note: World Rugby associates in italics.

=== Other teams ===
==== Not affiliated to World Rugby ====
Rugby Africa teams

- Benin
- Central African Republic
- Chad
- Congo
- Gabon
- Guinea
- Malawi
- Mozambique
- Niger
- Seychelles
- Sierra Leone

Asia Rugby teams

- Afghanistan
- Bangladesh
- Iraq
- Macau
- Oman
- Palestine
- Saudi Arabia

Rugby Europe teams

- Belarus
- Estonia
- Iceland
- Kosovo
- Liechtenstein
- San Marino

Rugby Americas North teams

- Belize
- Curaçao
- Dominican Republic
- French Guiana
- Guadeloupe
- Martinique
- Turks and Caicos Islands

Oceania Rugby teams

- Nauru
- New Caledonia
- Tahiti ‡
- Tuvalu
- Wallis and Futuna ‡

‡ Associate member of Oceania Rugby

Sudamerica Rugby teams

- Bolivia
- Ecuador
- El Salvador
- Honduras
- Nicaragua

Teams with affiliation suspended or without affiliation

- Albania
- Armenia
- Cambodia
- Comoros
- Gibraltar
- Mauritania
- Saint Kitts and Nevis
- Sudan
- Tokelau

==== Multinational teams ====
- The British and Irish Lions:
  - England
  - Ireland
  - Scotland
  - Wales
- East Africa (est. 1950) — conducted seven tours between 1954 and 1982; played against incoming international, representative, and club touring sides, including twice against the British Lions, and also against the Barbarians. Perhaps the only example of representative (as opposed to invitational) multinational teams playing against each other:
  - Kenya
  - Tanzania (formerly Tanganyika)
  - Uganda
- Pacific Islanders (est. 2004):
  - Fiji
  - Samoa
  - Tonga
- The South American Jaguars — a combination team who played South Africa during the early 1980s:
  - Argentina
  - Chile
  - Uruguay
- The African Leopards — a development side drawn from across Africa; have played representative rugby union against South African students.
- The Arabian Gulf rugby union team — combined teams from Arab countries in the Persian Gulf and competed in World Cup qualification. The Arabian Gulf Rugby Union has since been dismantled and responsibility devolved to member nations, though the team may be revived in the future:
- Bahrain
- Egypt
- Jordan
- Kuwait
- Lebanon
- Oman
- Qatar
- Saudi Arabia
- United Arab Emirates
- The West Indies side — the Caribbean Rugby Union first toured England in 1976 (managed by Gavin Clark); their last tour was also to England in October–November 2000.
- The Commonwealth of Independent States — played during the early 1990s:
- Armenia
- Azerbaijan
- Belarus
- Kazakhstan
- Kyrgyzstan
- Moldova
- Russia
- Tajikistan
- Turkmenistan
- Uzbekistan
- Ukraine
- The Black Sea Thunder — a newly established combined team of countries with Black Sea coastlines:
  - Bulgaria
  - Georgia
  - Romania
  - Turkey

==== Defunct national sides ====
Various national sides have ceased to exist for political reasons. In the case of the Soviet Union, Czechoslovakia, and Yugoslavia, there is more than one successor team. Catalonia's side ended due to the Spanish Civil War and Franco's crackdown. East and West Germany's sides merged into a single German side upon reunification.

Team	Notes
Arabian Gulf*	Dissolved by end of 2010; replaced by separate unions and national teams
Catalonia	
(Commonwealth of Independent States) CIS*	
Czechoslovakia	
East Africa*	Combination of Kenya, Tanzania/Tanganyika, and Uganda. Has not played since 1982; the Rugby Football Union of East Africa (RFUEA) still exists and there have been recent talks to resurrect the team.
East Germany	
Soviet Union	
Yugoslavia	

* For more information on these teams see above.

== Women's rugby ==
- Australia
- Austria
- Bahamas
- Barbados
- Belgium
- Bosnia and Herzegovina
- Botswana
- Brazil
- Burkina Faso
- Cameroon
- Canada
- Cayman Islands
- China
- Colombia
- Czech Republic
- Denmark
- England
- Fiji
- Finland
- France
- Germany
- Guyana
- Hong Kong
- India
- Ireland
- Italy
- Ivory Coast
- Jamaica
- Japan
- Kazakhstan
- Kenya
- Kyrgyzstan
- Luxembourg
- Madagascar
- Malaysia
- Namibia
- Netherlands
- New Zealand
- Norway
- Papua New Guinea
- Philippines
- Portugal
- Romania
- Russia
- Rwanda
- Saint Vincent and the Grenadines
- Samoa
- Scotland
- Senegal
- Serbia
- Singapore
- South Africa
- Spain
- Sweden
- Switzerland
- Thailand
- Tonga
- Trinidad and Tobago
- Tunisia
- Turkey
- Uganda
- United States
- Uzbekistan
- Wales
- Zambia
- Zimbabwe

=== Defunct women's national sides ===
- Catalonia
- Great Britain
- Soviet Union
