= 2013 FORU Oceania Cup =

2013 Oceania Cup
- Date: 6–13 July 2013
- Countries: Cook Islands; Papua New Guinea; Solomon Islands; Tahiti

Final positions
- Champions: Cook Islands
- Runner-up: Papua New Guinea

Tournament statistics
- Matches played: 6

The 2013 FORU Oceania Cup for national rugby union teams in the Oceania region was held in Papua New Guinea at the Lloyd Robson Oval in Port Moresby from 6 to 13 July.

The Cook Islands won the cup, by winning the round-robin tournament over Papua New Guinea, Solomon Islands, and Tahiti, to progress to the second stage of the Oceania qualifiers for the 2015 Rugby World Cup and a play-off against Fiji. Fiji and the other Band 1 teams from Oceania teams (Australia, New Zealand, Samoa, and Tonga) do not participate in the Oceania Cup.

== Standings ==
Pos	Team	Pld	W	D	L	PF	PA	+/–	BP	Pts
1	Cook Islands	3	3	0	0	116	48	+68	3	15
2	Papua New Guinea	3	2	0	1	99	93	+6	4	12
3	Solomon Islands	3	1	0	2	57	90	–33	1	5
4	Tahiti	3	0	0	3	59	100	–41	3	3
Updated: 13 July 2013; Source: oceaniarugby.com • The top team (Green background) advances to the 2015 RWC Oceania Qualifying Final.
Points breakdown: 4 points for a win 2 points for a draw 1 bonus point for a loss by seven points or less 1 bonus point for scoring four or more tries in a match

== Matches ==
6 July 2013
13:00

(1 BP) Cook Islands	38–5	Tahiti
	Summary

Lloyd Robson Oval, Port Moresby
Attendance: 4,000
Referee: Sam Tuidraki (Fiji)

6 July 2013
15:15

(1 BP) Papua New Guinea	29–22	Solomon Islands (1 BP)
	Summary

Lloyd Robson Oval, Port Moresby
Attendance: 6,000
Referee: Kaveni Talemaivalagi (Fiji)

9 July 2013
13:00

Solomon Islands	12–39	Cook Islands (1 BP)
	Summary

Lloyd Robson Oval, Port Moresby
Attendance: 1,000
Referee: Kaveni Talemaivalagi (Fiji)

9 July 2013
15:15

(1 BP) Papua New Guinea	39–32	Tahiti (2 BP)
	Summary

Lloyd Robson Oval, Port Moresby
Attendance: 3,000
Referee: James Bolabiu (Fiji)

13 July 2013
13:00

Solomon Islands	23–22	Tahiti (1 BP)
	Summary

Lloyd Robson Oval, Port Moresby
Attendance: 3,000
Referee: James Bolabiu (Fiji)

13 July 2013
15:15

(2 BP) Papua New Guinea	31–37	Cook Islands (1 BP)
	Summary

Lloyd Robson Oval, Port Moresby
Attendance: 7,000
Referee: Sam Tuidraki (Fiji)

== See also ==
- FORU Oceania Cup
