= 2003 FORU Oceania Cup =

2003 FORU Oceania Cup was an international rugby union tournament organised by the Federation of Oceania Rugby Unions (FORU). It was contested by four teams: the Cook Islands, New Caledonia, Niue and Tahiti.

The tournament was played as a round-robin competition, with each team playing the other three teams once. Niue won all three of its matches and finished as tournament champions.

== Teams ==
Four teams participated in the tournament:

- Cook Islands
- New Caledonia
- Niue
- (French Polynesia) Tahiti

== Matches ==
Date	Team	Result	Team	Venue
29 August 2003	Niue	38–14	New Caledonia	Auckland, New Zealand
29 August 2003	Cook Islands	56–18	(French Polynesia) Tahiti	Auckland, New Zealand
3 September 2003	Niue	78–8	(French Polynesia) Tahiti	Auckland, New Zealand
3 September 2003	Cook Islands	55–5	New Caledonia	Auckland, New Zealand
6 September 2003	Niue	17–14	Cook Islands	Auckland, New Zealand
6 September 2003	(French Polynesia) Tahiti	18–17	New Caledonia	Auckland, New Zealand

All six matches are recorded in the 2003 results archive of Rugby International, which identifies them as part of the Oceania Cup, Eastern Zone and gives Auckland as the venue for each match.

== Final standings ==
Pos.	Team	P	W	D	L	PF	PA	PD	Pts
1	Niue	3	3	0	0	133	36	+97	6
2	Cook Islands	3	2	0	1	125	40	+85	4
3	(French Polynesia) Tahiti	3	1	0	2	44	151	−107	2
4	New Caledonia	3	0	0	3	36	111	−75	0

The final standings are calculated from the six recorded match results.

== See also ==
- Oceania Rugby Men's Championship
- Cook Islands national rugby union team
- New Caledonia national rugby union team
- Niue national rugby union team
- Tahiti national rugby union team
