= 2008 FORU Oceania Cup =

2008 Oceania Cup
- Date: 16 August 2008– 30 April 2008
- Countries: Cook Islands; Niue; New Caledonia; Vanuatu

Final positions
- Champions: Niue
- Runner-up: New Caledonia

Tournament statistics
- Matches played: 3

The 2008 FORU Oceania Cup was a rugby union competition for countries and territories in Oceania with national teams in the developmental band.

The tournament was played as a straight knockout, which was won by Niue. The Band 1 teams from Oceania teams (Australia, New Zealand, Fiji, Samoa, and Tonga) do not participate in the Oceania Cup.

== First round ==
=== Western Zone ===
16 August 2008

New Caledonia	29–20^{[A]}	Vanuatu
	Report

Rivière Salée Stadium, Noumea
Referee: Mikea Rokodrakia (Fiji)

- 1. New Caledonia qualified for final
- 2. Vanuatu

=== Eastern Zone ===
16 August 2008

Cook Islands	7–18	Niue
	Report

Tereora National Stadium, Rarotonga, Cook Islands

Ranking:

- 1. Niue qualified for final
- 2. Cook Islands

== Final ==
30 August 2008

New Caledonia	5–27	Niue
	Report

Rivière Salée Stadium, Noumea
Referee: Sione Tanoa (Fiji)

== See also ==
- FORU Oceania Cup

Notes

^{[A]} The score on the Rugby International match report was 29–20 to New Caledonia, but the FORU web site originally recorded it as 32–20 to New Caledonia (since corrected).
