= 2011 FORU Oceania Cup =

2011 Oceania Cup
- Date: 29 November 2011– 3 December 2011
- Countries: Niue; Papua New Guinea; Solomon Islands; Vanuatu

Final positions
- Champions: Papua New Guinea
- Runner-up: Solomon Islands

Tournament statistics
- Matches played: 6

The 2011 FORU Oceania Cup for national rugby union teams in the Oceania region was held in Papua New Guinea at the Lloyd Robson Oval in Port Moresby from 29 November to 3 December.

Papua New Guinea won the cup, retaining their title from 2009, by winning the round-robin tournament over Vanuatu, Solomon Islands, and Niue.

== Round-robin tournament ==
Rank	Teams	P	W	D	L	PF	PA
1st place, gold medalist(s)	Papua New Guinea	3	3	0	0	147	43
2nd place, silver medalist(s)	Solomon Islands	3	2	0	1	85	72
3rd place, bronze medalist(s)	Niue	3	1	0	2	58	73
4	Vanuatu	3	0	0	3	38	158

29 November 2011

Niue	19 - 22	Solomon Islands
	Report

Lloyd Robson Oval

29 November 2011

Papua New Guinea	78 - 3	Vanuatu
	Report

Lloyd Robson Oval

1 December 2011

Vanuatu	15 - 32	Niue
	Report

Lloyd Robson Oval

1 December 2011

Solomon Islands	15 - 33	Papua New Guinea
	Report

Lloyd Robson Oval

3 December 2011

Vanuatu	20 - 48	Solomon Islands
	Report

Lloyd Robson Oval

3 December 2011

Papua New Guinea	36 - 7	Niue
	Report

Lloyd Robson Oval

== See also ==
- FORU Oceania Cup
