= 2015 Oceania Rugby Cup =

2015 Oceania Cup
- Date: August 2015
- Countries: American Samoa; Papua New Guinea; Solomon Islands; Tahiti

Final positions
- Champions: Papua New Guinea
- Runner-up: Tahiti

The 2015 Oceania Rugby Cup for national rugby union teams in the Oceania region was held in Papua New Guinea at the Lloyd Robson Oval in Port Moresby in August 2015. Papua New Guinea won the title by finishing on top of the table after completing the round-robin tournament undefeated.

== Teams ==
Participating nations for the 2015 tournament were:

- American Samoa
- Papua New Guinea
- Solomon Islands
- Tahiti

== Standings ==
Pos	Team	Pld	W	D	L	PF	PA	+/–	BP	Pts
1	Papua New Guinea	3	3	0	0	126	51	+75	3	15
2	Tahiti	3	2	0	1	66	52	+14	1	9
3	American Samoa	3	1	0	2	60	71	-11	1	5
4	Solomon Islands	3	0	0	3	46	124	-78	0	0
Updated: 30 August 2015; Source: espnscrum.com
Points breakdown: 4 points for a win 2 points for a draw 1 bonus point for a loss by seven points or less 1 bonus point for scoring four or more tries in a match

== Matches ==
=== Round 1 ===
22 August 2015

(1BP) American Samoa	30–15	Solomon Islands
	Report

Lloyd Robson Oval, Port Moresby

22 August 2015

(1 BP) Papua New Guinea	32–10	Tahiti
	Report

Lloyd Robson Oval, Port Moresby

=== Round 2 ===
26 August 2015

Solomon Islands	12–36	Tahiti (1BP)
	Report

Lloyd Robson Oval, Port Moresby

26 August 2015

(1 BP) Papua New Guinea	36–22	American Samoa
	Report

Lloyd Robson Oval, Port Moresby

=== Round 3 ===
30 August 2015

American Samoa	8–20	Tahiti
	Report

Lloyd Robson Oval, Port Moresby

30 August 2015

(1 BP) Papua New Guinea	58–19	Solomon Islands
	Report

Lloyd Robson Oval, Port Moresby

== See also ==
- Oceania Rugby Cup
