= 2009 FORU Oceania Cup =

2009 Oceania Cup
- Date: 27 June to 4 July 2009
- Countries: Niue; Papua New Guinea; Cook Islands; Vanuatu

Final positions
- Champions: Papua New Guinea
- Runner-up: Cook Islands

Tournament statistics
- Matches played: 3

The 2009 Oceania Nations Cup doubled as the first round of Oceania's qualifying tournament for the 2011 Rugby World Cup. By winning the Oceania Nations Cup, Papua New Guinea advanced to face Samoa in the Oceania qualification final.

Tahiti and New Caledonia were originally slated to participate, but withdrew.

== Play-offs ==
Semi-finals
June 27, 2009
Papua New Guinea	86
Vanuatu	12
June 27, 2009
Cook Islands	29
Niue	7

Final
July 4, 2009
Papua New Guinea	29
Cook Islands	21

=== Semi-finals ===
27 June 2009

Papua New Guinea	86–12	Vanuatu

Lloyd Robson Oval, Port Moresby, Papua New Guinea

27 June 2009

Cook Islands	29–7	Niue

Lloyd Robson Oval, Port Moresby, Papua New Guinea

=== Final ===
4 July 2009

Papua New Guinea	29–21	Cook Islands

Lloyd Robson Oval, Port Moresby, Papua New Guinea
