= Tahiti Rugby Union =

- Sport: Rugby union
- Founded: 1989
- World Rugby affiliation: 1994
- Oceania Rugby affiliation: ??
- President: Charles Tauziet

The Tahiti Rugby Union (French: Fédération Tahitienne de Rugby de Polynésie Française) is the governing body for rugby union in Tahiti. It was founded in 1989 and became affiliated to the International Rugby Board (now World Rugby) in 1994.

It is also a full member of Oceania Rugby, which is the governing body for rugby union in Oceania.

== National teams ==
The Tahiti 15-a-side team has competed at the South Pacific Games in the 1970s and 80s, and more recently has won the FORU Oceania Cup in 2017 against rivals Cook Islands. Tahiti fields teams in 7s competitions as well as 15s. The national women's 7s team has also competed at the Pacific Games.

== See also ==
- Rugby union in Tahiti
- Tahiti national rugby union team
- Tahiti national rugby union team (sevens)
- Tahiti women's national rugby union team (sevens)
