= 2011 Rugby World Cup – Oceania qualification =

Qualifiers for Oceania

There was one qualifier for Rugby World Cup 2011 from the Oceania region. The qualifying process began with the 2009 Oceania Nations Cup, with the winner going on to play Samoa.

The first stage was the four team Oceania Nations Cup. The Cup was played as a straight knock-out. The winner then advanced to the final qualifier against Samoa, a two legged playoff to decide the Oceania Qualifier who faced South Africa, Wales, Fiji, and the African qualifier (Namibia) in Pool D

Oceania was the only region not to send a team to the 20th place playoff.

== Round 1: Oceania Cup ==
Papua New Guinea won the 2009 Oceania Cup and advanced to Round 2.

Semi-finals
June 27, 2009
Papua New Guinea	86
Vanuatu	12
June 27, 2009
Cook Islands	29
Niue	7

Final
July 4, 2009
Papua New Guinea	29
Cook Islands	21

=== Semi-finals ===
27 June 2009

Papua New Guinea	86–12	Vanuatu

Lloyd Robson Oval, Port Moresby, Papua New Guinea

27 June 2009

Cook Islands	29–7	Niue

Lloyd Robson Oval, Port Moresby, Papua New Guinea

=== Final ===
4 July 2009

Papua New Guinea	29–21	Cook Islands

Lloyd Robson Oval, Port Moresby, Papua New Guinea

== Round 2: Oceania final ==
Samoa won 188–19 on aggregate and progressed to the 2011 Rugby World Cup finals as Oceania 1.

=== Home and away ===
11 July 2009

Samoa	115–7	Papua New Guinea

Apia Park, Apia

18 July 2009

Papua New Guinea	12–73	Samoa

Lloyd Robson Oval, Port Moresby
