= Rugby union in Nauru =

Sport

- Country: Nauru
- Governing body: Nauru Rugby Union
- National team: Nauru

Rugby union in Nauru is a minor but growing sport. The national team have competed in various international competitions, including the Pacific Games.

== Governing body ==
In 2011, the Nauru Rugby Union was founded with the aim of re-establishing rugby union in the country. Through gradual development of the sport, rugby eventually became the second most popular sport in Nauru behind Australian rules football. The Naru Rugby Union is an associate member of Oceania Rugby (formerly FORU), and has applied to become an associate member of World Rugby.

== History ==
Rugby was first introduced into Nauru, by its connection with Australia and the British Empire in the 1890s. However with Australian rules football in Nauru booming in popularity from the 1910s and by 1954, local rugby and association football leagues were all wound up without sufficient players. The newly formed South Pacific Rugby Union formed in 1969 and extended an invitation for Nauru to join, however there was no organised competition at the time.

Rugby Union was reintroduced in 2012 sports grants from the Australian Sports Outreach Program funded by Australian government AusAID and the Nauru national rugby sevens team debuted at the 2015 Pacific Games. In 2019, the Nauru national rugby union team made their international debut in the Oceania Rugby Cup against the Papua New Guinea national rugby union team (PNG). In 2021, the Australian government started a campaign to invest in the development of rugby in Nauru and PNG. Due to a lack of facilities, Nauru's junior rugby teams often have to play in rugby tournaments abroad.

== See also ==
- Nauru national rugby union team
- Nauru national rugby union team (sevens)
