= 2003 Rugby World Cup – Oceania qualification =

Rugby World Cup

In qualification for the 2003 Rugby World Cup, a number of positions were available to Oceania nations. Fiji and Samoa qualified, joining automatic qualifiers Australia and New Zealand, while Tonga progressed to the repechage, where they faced South Korea.

== Round 1 ==
The six teams in the "Small Islands" group were divided into Western and Eastern pools, comprising three teams each. The teams in each pool played each other in a single round robin, with the top team in each pool qualifying for round 3.

=== Pool A (Eastern Zone) ===
| Pos | Team | Pld | W | D | L | PF | PA | PD | Pts |
|---|---|---|---|---|---|---|---|---|---|
| 1 | Cook Islands | 2 | 2 | 0 | 0 | 114 | 8 | +106 | 6 |
| 2 | Tahiti | 2 | 1 | 0 | 1 | 41 | 92 | −51 | 4 |
| 3 | Niue | 2 | 0 | 0 | 2 | 14 | 69 | −55 | 2 |

| Date | Home team | Score | Away team | Venue |
|---|---|---|---|---|
| 2 June 2001 | Cook Islands | 86–0 | Tahiti | Rarotonga, Cook Islands |
| 9 June 2001 | Niue | 8–28 | Cook Islands | Alofi, Niue |
| 16 June 2001 | Tahiti | 41–6 | Niue | Papeete, Tahiti |

=== Pool B (Western Zone) ===
| Pos | Team | Pld | W | D | L | PF | PA | PD | Pts |
|---|---|---|---|---|---|---|---|---|---|
| 1 | Papua New Guinea | 2 | 2 | 0 | 0 | 64 | 20 | +44 | 6 |
| 2 | Solomon Islands | 2 | 1 | 0 | 1 | 21 | 35 | −14 | 4 |
| 3 | Vanuatu | 2 | 0 | 0 | 2 | 13 | 43 | −30 | 2 |

| Date | Home team | Score | Away team | Venue |
|---|---|---|---|---|
| 2 June 2001 | Papua New Guinea | 32–10 | Solomon Islands | Port Moresby, Papua New Guinea |
| 9 June 2001 | Vanuatu | 10–32 | Papua New Guinea | Port Vila, Vanuatu |
| 16 June 2001 | Solomon Islands | 11–3 | Vanuatu | Honiara, Solomon Islands |

== Round 2 ==
In Round 2, the traditional three biggest Pacific Island nations played a single round-robin tournament. The top two qualified directly for the Rugby World Cup as Oceania 1 and 2 respectively, while the bottom-placed team went to Round 4 of qualifying. Fiji finished top and qualified for Pool B as Oceania 1, while Samoa finished second and were placed in Pool C as Oceania 2.

| Pos | Team | Pld | W | D | L | PF | PA | PD | Pts |
|---|---|---|---|---|---|---|---|---|---|
| 1 | Fiji | 4 | 3 | 0 | 1 | 123 | 80 | +43 | 10 |
| 2 | Samoa | 4 | 3 | 0 | 1 | 96 | 58 | +38 | 10 |
| 3 | Tonga | 4 | 0 | 0 | 4 | 71 | 152 | −81 | 4 |

| Date | Home team | Score | Away team | Venue |
|---|---|---|---|---|
| 1 June 2002 | Samoa | 16–17 | Fiji | Apia, Samoa |
| 7 June 2002 | Tonga | 22–47 | Fiji | Nukuʻalofa Tonga |
| 15 June 2002 | Tonga | 16–27 | Samoa | Nukuʻalofa, Tonga |
| 22 June 2002 | Fiji | 12–22 | Samoa | Suva Fiji |
| 28 June 2002 | Samoa | 31–13 | Tonga | Apia, Samoa |
| 6 July 2002 | Fiji | 47–20 | Tonga | Suva Fiji |

== Round 3 ==
Round 3 saw the winners of the two pools in round 1 play home and away to qualify for round 4.

| Date | Home team | Score | Away team | Venue |
|---|---|---|---|---|
| 19 October 2002 | Papua New Guinea | 29–14 | Cook Islands | Port Moresby, Papua New Guinea |
| 26 October 2002 | Cook Islands | 21–13 | Papua New Guinea | Rarotonga, Cook Islands |

== Round 4 ==
Round 4 saw Papua New Guinea, the winners from round 3, take on Tonga, the third-placed team from round 2. The winners would qualify for the repechage. Tonga won 131–26 on aggregate to progress.

| Date | Home team | Score | Away team | Venue |
|---|---|---|---|---|
| 30 November 2002 | Papua New Guinea | 14–47 | Tonga | Port Moresby, Papua New Guinea |
| 6 December 2002 | Tonga | 84–12 | Papua New Guinea | Nukuʻalofa, Tonga |
