= 2022 Oceania Rugby Men's Championship =

Rugby union tournament

2022 Oceania Cup
Tournament details
- Host: Papua New Guinea
- Date: 2–10 November
- Countries: Papua New Guinea; Solomon Islands; Vanuatu

Final positions
- Champions: Papua New Guinea
- Runner-up: Vanuatu

Tournament statistics
- Matches played: 3

The 2022 Oceania Rugby Men's Championship was a tournament for national rugby union teams in the Oceania region. The tournament was initially expected to be held in Papua New Guinea on 19 October but was postponed to 2 November. It was held at the Sir Hubert Murray Stadium in Port Moresby.

The Papua New Guinea Pukpuks retained the Oceania Rugby Championship trophy after going undefeated in the competition.

== Standings ==
Pos	Team	Pld	W	D	L	PF	PA	+/–	Pts
1	Papua New Guinea	2	2	0	0	61	31	+30	8
2	Vanuatu	2	1	0	1	40	54	–14	4
3	Solomon Islands	2	0	0	2	33	49	–16	0

Points breakdown:
4 points for a win
2 points for a draw

== Matches ==
=== Round 1 ===
2 November 2022	Papua New Guinea	39–13	Vanuatu	Sir Hubert Murray Stadium
5:00 PM	Try: Minpipi 81'; Yenmoro 72'; Joe 54'; Kalas 44'; Tekiong 36'; Uro 18'; Piten 11'; Con: Butler (2/7) 19', 37'	Report	Try: Taiwia 42'; Con: David 43'; Pen: David 16', 30'

=== Round 2 ===
6 November 2022	Papua New Guinea	22–18	Solomon Islands	Sir Hubert Murray Stadium
5:00 PM	Try: Butler 71'; Piten 65'; Toklong 18'; Con: Butler (2/3) 19', 72'; Pen: Butler 58'	Report	Try: Faalimae 54'; Lakoa 36'; Con: Tongaka (1/2) 37'; Pen: Nasiu 60'; Sade 16'

=== Round 3 ===
10 November 2022	Vanuatu	27–15	Solomon Islands	Sir Hubert Murray Stadium
5:00 PM	Try: Tesuatai 55'; Penalty Try 44'; Kativerata 17'; Beuka 2'; Con: Sade (1/4) 3'; Pen: Sade 33'	Report	Try: Kalsal (2) 10', 25'; Con: Ruben (1/2) 11'; Pen: Ruben 35'

== Broadcast ==
All matches were broadcast on EMTV.
