= Nemani Nadolo =

Fiji international rugby union player

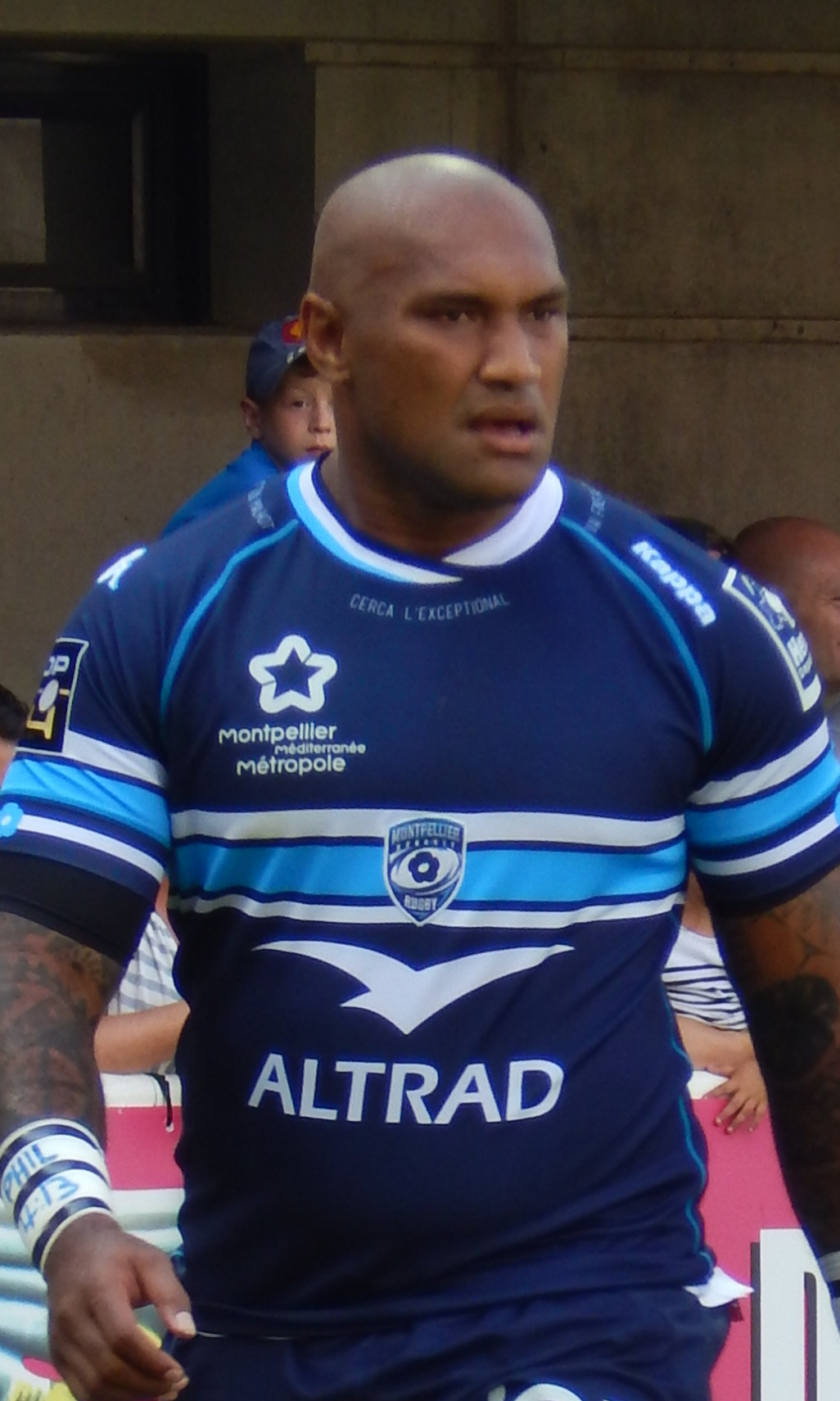
- Nadolo with Montpellier
- Full name: Ratu Nemani Driu Nasiganiyavi
- Born: 31 January 1988 (age 38) Sigatoka, Fiji
- Height: 195 cm (6 ft 5 in)
- Weight: 137 kg (21 st 8 lb; 302 lb)
- School: St Joseph's College, Nudgee

Rugby union career
- Position: Centre / Wing
Amateur team(s)
Years	Team	Apps	(Points)
2007	Perth Spirit		
2008	Manly		
2008–2009	Randwick		
Senior career
Years	Team	Apps	(Points)
2010	Bourgoin	16	(25)
2011	Exeter Chiefs	5	(0)
2011–2015	NEC Green Rockets	51	(286)
2016–2020	Montpellier	69	(265)
2020–2022	Leicester Tigers	43	(95)
- Correct as of 27 November 2022
Super Rugby
Years	Team	Apps	(Points)
2014–2016	Crusaders	39	(143)
2023	Waratahs	4	(5)
- Correct as of 1 April 2023
International career
Years	Team	Apps	(Points)
2008	Australia U20	5	(35)
2010-2019	Fiji	30	(206)
- Correct as of 5 December 2021

Nemani Nadolo (formerly Ratu Nasiganiyavi; born 31 January 1988) is a Fijian-Australian former rugby union player. He most recently played for the New South Wales Waratahs in Super Rugby, usually as a wing or centre, and the Fiji national team.

Nadolo was the overall top try scorer of the 2014 Super Rugby season competition while playing for the Crusaders, scoring a try in both the semi-final and final. He is known for his speed and size, and occasionally standing in as a goal-kicker for conversions and penalties. He won 30 caps for Fiji between 2010 and 2019. He previously played for Leicester Tigers in England's Premiership Rugby, Montpellier in France's Top 14 and NEC Green Rockets in Japan's Top League.

== Family and early life ==
Ratu Nemani Driu Nasiganiyavi was born in Sigatoka, Fiji. At three months of age he moved with his family to Brisbane, Australia. His father, Isei Nasiganiyavi, played rugby for Queensland in the 1980s.

He changed his name to Nemani Nadolo later as an adult, adopting his mother's maiden name in 2009 instead of the surname of his father who had left the family home when he was young.

Nadolo attended Nudgee College, and was selected for the Queensland Schoolboys rugby team in 2005. He is the older brother of Chris Kuridrani and Inosi Nadolo, and a cousin of Tevita Kuridrani and Lote Tuqiri.

== Rugby career ==
=== Early career ===
After featuring for Perth Spirit in the 2007 Australian Rugby Championship (as Ratu Siganiyavi), he headed east to play for Randwick in 2008. He hit the ground running for Randwick, scoring 13 tries in his first 7 matches. His club rugby season was punctuated by selection for the Australian Under 20 team for the 2008 IRB Junior World Championship, where he crossed 7 times in 5 matches to be the tournament's leading tryscorer.

Nadolo was one of the finds of the 2008 season, with his hard-running and try-scoring prowess earning the powerhouse wing a Super 14 contract with the Waratahs.

Nadolo's size, style of play and Pacific Islander background drew him comparisons to Jonah Lomu when he signed for the Waratahs in 2008. He is documented to have a sprint time under 11 seconds over 100 metres. He played his first match for the Junior Waratahs on the 2008 Development Tour of Fiji less than 200 metres from his mother's village in Nadi. After changing his name to Nemani Nadolo in November 2009, he signed to play for Manly in the Shute Shield for 2010.

=== Europe ===
Nadolo signed with French Top 14 team Bourgoin-Jallieu for the 2010–11 season, but transferred to England's Exeter Chiefs in January 2011. Nadolo's brief time at Exeter was fairly troublesome. He was registered at Exeter under his Australian passport and was mistakenly picked alongside two other non-Kolpak players. This is a breach of RFU regulations and resulted in Exeter being docked two points and fined £5,000. Also while at Exeter he was arrested by police for drink driving. He was subsequently banned from driving for 18 months and fined £950. Nadolo was immediately released from his contract with the club.

=== Japan ===
Nadolo played for the NEC Green Rockets in the Japan Top League between 2011 and 2013.

=== Super Rugby ===
In October 2013, Nadolo signed to play for Crusaders in the 2014 Super Rugby season. In March 2014, he made his Super Rugby debut off the bench against the Melbourne Rebels. He went on to play 14 Super Rugby games, including 12 starts, in his first season and was the equal top try scorer with Israel Folau, notching 12 tries. He scored a try in both the semi-final and final but it wasn't enough to win the Super Rugby title as his Crusaders team lost to his former team, the Waratahs, by 33–32.

In August 2014, Nadolo re-signed with the Crusaders for two more seasons.

On May 4 2022 the Waratahs announced the signing of Nadolo from Leicester Tigers for the 2023 season. Nadolo returns to the Waratahs 12 years after he was deemed surplus to requirements by the franchise in 2010.

=== Top 14 ===
In November 2015, Nadolo signed a three-year deal with French Top 14 side, Montpellier. He left at the end of the 2020 Super Rugby season.

=== Premiership Rugby ===
In March 2020 it was announced that Nadolo would be joining Premiership side Leicester Tigers for the 2020-21 season. Nadolo made his debut on 26 August 2020 at Welford Road in a match against London Irish, with Nadolo impressing in a 13-7 win.

On 30 October 2021, Nadolo scored two tries in the East Midlands Derby against Northampton Saints.

Nadolo left the Tigers before the conclusion of the 2022–23 season and return to Australia to rejoin the NSW Waratahs ahead of their 2023 season.

== International career ==
Nadolo made his Test debut in 2010 when selected in the 24-member Fiji team for a one-off match against Australia, followed by the 2010 IRB Pacific Nations Cup.

In June 2014, Nadolo joined Fiji for the one-off test against Italy. He was instrumental in that game playing at his preferred position of Inside centre scoring 13 points including a try. A week later in the 2014 IRB Pacific Nations Cup, he faced Tonga scoring 20 points including a try and kicking 6 conversion and a long-range penalty. A week later, against Samoa, he scored a try but it was not enough for a win as Fiji lost in a nail-biting encounter, 13–18. In his final game for Fiji in June in the 2015 Rugby World Cup – Oceania qualification match against Cook Islands. He scored a hat-trick of tries and in the process equalled the all-time record set by Christian Cullen and John Kirwan of scoring 10 tries in consecutive matches.

Nadolo returned for Fiji in 2015 and played on the wing against the Māori All Blacks in Suva but while scoring a try, he damaged his pectoral muscles which ruled him out for 6 weeks and the 2015 World Rugby Pacific Nations Cup. He was nevertheless included in the final 31-member squad for the 2015 Rugby World Cup. He returned to play for Fiji in a warm-up game against Canada on the left wing and though he didn't score a try, he kicked 5 conversions and 4 penalties with his boot ending the game with a 100% kicking percentage. He scored a try against England in the first match of the 2015 Rugby World Cup on 18 September 2015.

Along with teammate Timoci Nagusa, he retired from International rugby just months before the 2019 Rugby World Cup and remained with Montpellier as their season continued during the World Cup.

== Post-playing Career ==
At the conclusion of the 2023 Super Rugby competition, Nadolo elected not to re-sign for the Waratahs. Nadolo has since worked as an HR Manager, franchised a Jim's Mowing business in Sydney and Melbourne, and currently works as a Business Development Manager & National Growth Manager and as a commentator for the Fijian Drua.
