= John McKee (rugby union coach) =

NZ rugby union coach

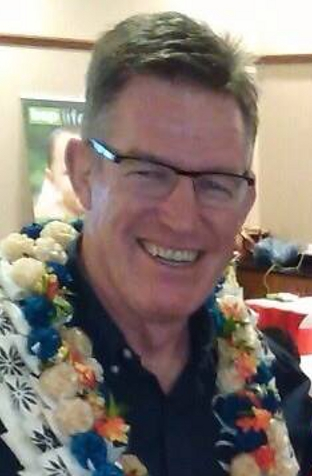
- McKee in 2015.
- Born: John Gregory McKee; 1957 (age 68–69) Wellington, New Zealand
- University: Monash University; Massey University

Rugby union career
Coaching career
- Years: Team
- 2000–2002: AS Montferrand
- 2002–2005: Connacht
- 2005–2006: Cornish Pirates
- 2006–2007: Central Coast Rays
- 2008: Pacific Islanders (Assistant coach)
- 2010–2012; 2021: Tonga (Technical adviser)
- 2012–2013: Australia U20 (Assistant coach)
- 2014–2020: Fiji
- 2020–2021: Western Force (Assistant coach)
- 2022–: Ireland women's

John Gregory McKee is a rugby union coach from New Zealand. He is a former coach of the Fiji national rugby 15s team.

== Career ==
John Mckee is a New Zealand-born rugby union coach, who was the head coach of Fiji's 15s national rugby team. John Gregory McKee was born in Wellington, New Zealand, in 1957.

McKee coached in the late 1990s in Australia and had success in 1999 leading Eastwood Rugby to the Club's first ever premiership win in the Shute Shield defeating Sydney University 34-17.

He left in 2000 to coach French side AS Montferrand (now known as ASM Clermont Auvergne). In doing so, he led the team to the final of the 2000–01 French Rugby Union Championship, but lost 34–22 to Toulouse. In 2002 he became assistant coach of Connacht under Michael Bradley. McKee and Bradley led Connacht to the Quarter Finals of the 2002–03 Celtic League and the 2002–03 European Challenge Cup, before leading the side to two consecutive Semi Finals in the European Challenge Cup; 2003–04 and 2004–05. He left Ireland in 2005 to take over Cornish Pirates in the 2005–06 National Division One, finishing third behind Bedford Blues and Harlequins.

In 2007 he returned to Australia as the head coach of Central Coast Rays in the inaugural and sole Australian Rugby Championship. The Rays finished second behind the Western Sydney Rams in the normal season, but finished on top at the final against Melbourne Rebels, winning 20–12. When the ARC became defunct, McKee travelled with the Pacific Islanders rugby union team on their 2008 European tour as a Specialist Coach. This tour included a record first-ever victory for the side, winning 25–17 against Italy. He furthered his international experience when he was named the Technical Advisor for Tonga in the year leading up to and during the 2011 Rugby World Cup.

After working with Tonga, he took up the role of Programs Coach at the Australian Rugby Union, where he was involved in developing and delivering rugby programs for 18- to 22-year-old players in the ARU National Academy Program. This also meant he was the assistant coach for the Australian Under-20's side in the 2013 IRB Junior World Championship in France, Australia finished seventh.

He is an Australian Rugby Union Level 3 coach and has a NZRU-Massey University Diploma of Management. He has an Australian Strength and Conditioning Association Level 1 Coaching certification, and has a Fitness Instructor Certification from Monash University.

=== Fiji ===
In November 2013, McKee was appointed as the Fiji Rugby Union (FRU) High Performance Unit general manager with the goal to get Fiji into the top eight of the IRB World Rankings. However, when the then head coach Inoke Male was sacked by the FRU due to financial issues, McKee expressed his desire in succeeding Male in February 2014, hoping that as head coach he could do more to help Fiji into the top eight of the World Rankings. On 2 May 2014, McKee was officially announced as the Flying Fijians head coach, cutting short his three-year contract as High Performance Unit general manager, and would lead the team into the final 2015 Rugby World Cup qualification match against the Cook Islands in June 2014.

In McKee's first match in charge, he led Fiji to a 25–14 win over Italy, Fiji's first win over a Tier 1 team since their 38–34 win over Wales in the 2007 Rugby World Cup. In addition to this, he also led Fiji to first in the Pacific Islands conference of the 2014 IRB Pacific Nations Cup. This included a 45–17 win over Tonga and a 13–18 loss to Samoa. He coached the team to a 108–6 win over the Cook Islands in the 2015 Rugby World Cup Oceania qualification process, thus qualifying for England 2015, joining Pool A. During Fiji's 2014 European tour, McKee led the team to just one victory, coming against the United States winning 20–14. They had lost before this match, losing to France 40–15 and narrowly to Wales 17–13.

In 2015, McKee led the team to victory in the 2015 World Rugby Pacific Nations Cup, where Fiji beat Tonga 30–22 and Japan 27–22, while also drawing with Samoa 30–30. The Fiji-Samoa game was repeated again in the final, which saw Fiji out score Samoa 5 tries to 3, winning 39–29. McKee later led Fiji into the 2015 Rugby World Cup, where despite only picking up one win, 47–15 win over Uruguay, Fiji was largely competitive in all 4 matches, holding Wales to a 23–13 win and Australia to 28–13. McKee was linked with the Japan post, but McKee dismissed the rumours announcing that he would seek renewal of is contract through to the 2019 Rugby World Cup.

In 2016, McKee lead Fiji to their third consecutive Pacific Nations Cup title, having beaten Tonga 23–18, after being down 15–0 at half time, and defeating Samoa 26–16. However, on 24 June, Fiji lost against Georgia for the first time, losing 14–3. During their 2016 end-of-year tour, Fiji gained a single win across 3 matches, coming in the final week against Japan 38–25. The other games saw Fiji get defeated by England, 58–15 and the Barbarians 40–7.

In June 2017, Fiji was the only Tier 2 nation to play three Tier 1 internationals; Australia, Italy and Scotland. McKee led Fiji to two victories, their homes tests against Italy, 22–19, and Scotland, 27–22. It was the first ever time that Fiji had beaten more than one Tier 1 team in a single calendar year, while also beating Scotland for the first time since 1998. The Australian test saw Fiji lose to Australia in Melbourne 37–14. On 8 July 2017, McKee helped Fiji qualify for the 2019 Rugby World Cup after beating Tonga 14–10 during the 2017 World Rugby Pacific Nations Cup. A week later with a 38–16 victory over Samoa saw Fiji retain their PNC title for a third consecutive year. Fiji continued their good form into their End-of-year European tour, narrowly losing Tier 1 sides Italy, 19–10, and Ireland 23–20. Fiji's only victory came in their final test on tour, defeating Canada 57–17, which was a record winning margin for Fiji over the Canadians.

In June 2018, McKee led Fiji to their fourth consecutive Pacific Nations title, after beating Samoa 24–22 in the opening round and newcomers Georgia 37–15 in the second round. Despite the winning the PNC title, On 23 June, Fiji lost to Tonga for the first time since 2011 27–19, in a one-off test match outside the PNC. The 2018 November test matches say Fiji win two from three games, including an historic victory over France, winning 21–14. Records continued for Fiji at the start of the 2019 International season, defeating the Māori All Blacks in Suva 27–10 in preparation for the 2019 World Rugby Pacific Nations Cup and World Cup. This was Fiji's first ever win over the Māori All Blacks in 16 matches, dating back to 1957. However the return fixture saw the Māori's win 26–17. During the 2019 PNC, Fiji not only lost their title held since 2015, but they also lost their first game in the competition since 2014; after losing to Japan 34–21 in the opening round. Victories over Canada and Samoa, meant Fiji finished runners-up to Japan.

=== Western Force ===
After leaving Fiji in January 2020, McKee took up an assistant role later in the year with Super Rugby team Western Force. McKee left the team in September 2021, and was replaced by Paul Tito.

== Honours ==
- World Rugby Pacific Nations Cup
  - Winners: 2015, 2016, 2017, 2018
  - Runners-up: 2014, 2019

Sporting positions
Preceded by (Fiji) Inoke Male	Fiji National Rugby Union Coach; 2014–2020	Succeeded by (New Zealand) Vern Cotter
