= 2017 Oceania Rugby Cup =

Rugby tournament in the Cook Islands

Tournament details
- Host: Cook Islands
- Date: 4 August 2017

Final positions
- Champions: Tahiti
- Runner-up: Cook Islands

The 2017 Oceania Rugby Cup for national rugby union teams in the Oceania region was held in Cook Islands at the National Stadium in Rarotonga on 4 August 2017. With Papua New Guinea being forced to withdraw, only two countries remained in the competition played as a straight knock-out match as part of Oceania qualification for the 2019 Rugby World Cup.

Tahiti, as the winner of the match over host nation Cook Islands, advanced to the Asia/Oceania play-off repechage, to play the winner of Round 3 of the Asian qualification process.

Because Tahiti was disqualified from moving on for fielding ineligible players, Cook Islands moved on and will now face Hong Kong.

== Match ==
4 August 2017

Cook Islands	9–13	Tahiti
Pen: Jamian Iroa (3/4) 11', 39', 41'; Cards: Mathew Mullany (yellow card) 30' to 40'; Stephen Willis (yellow card) 73' to 83'; Mana Havi (yellow card) 76' to 86'; Longo Leuta (red card) 90+4'	WR Report	Try: Vincent Perez 30'; Guillaume Brouqui 44'; Con: Andoni Jimenez (0/2); Pen: Andoni Jimenez (1/1) 2'; Cards: Martin Taeae (yellow card) 48' (red card) 59'; James Tekurio (yellow card) 67' (red card) 81'

National Stadium, Rarotonga
