= Oceania Rugby Men's Championship =

Rugby union competition

- Current season or competition: 2022 Oceania Rugby Men's Championship
- Sport: Rugby union football
- Instituted: 2005
- Number of teams: 3 (2022)
- Region: Oceania
- Holders: Papua New Guinea (2022)
- Most titles: Papua New Guinea (7 titles)

The Oceania Rugby Men's Championship (formerly known as the Oceania Cup) is an international rugby union competition for countries and territories from Oceania with national teams in the developmental band. It is administered by Oceania Rugby.

The tournament has been played under various formats depending on the number and strength of the teams entered. The first competition was held in 1996-97 as part of the qualification process for the 1999 Rugby World Cup.

The competition was officially re-launched as the FORU Oceania Cup for the 2007 season. From 2009 onward, it has been held bi-annually and it has been played under a round robin format since 2011, with the title awarded to the leading team on the ladder after all matches are completed.

The 2009 champions were Papua New Guinea, who defeated the Cook Islands 29-21 in the final. Papua New Guinea retained their title in 2011, winning the round-robin tournament over Vanuatu, Solomon Islands and Niue.

Cook Islands defeated Papua New Guinea 37-31 on the final day of the 2013 tournament, winning the tournament from the defending champions, with Solomon Islands third, and Tahiti fourth. The Cook Islands did not compete in 2015, and Papua New Guinea claimed their fourth title with Tahiti finishing as runner-up.

== Teams ==
Competing nations in the Oceania Rugby Cup are:

- American Samoa
- Cook Islands
- Nauru
- New Caledonia
- Niue
- Papua New Guinea
- Solomon Islands
- Tahiti
- Vanuatu

Note: The Tier 1 and 2 teams from Oceania (Australia, Fiji, New Zealand, Samoa, and Tonga) do not participate in the Oceania Rugby Cup.

== Summary ==
Winners and runners-up for official FORU and IRB (WR) developmental tournaments in Oceania:

Year	Winner	Score	Runner-up	Match venue	Refs
Oceania tournaments
1996*	Cook Islands	round-robin	Papua New Guinea	Rarotonga	
2002*	Papua New Guinea	29–14; 16–21	Cook Islands	Port Moresby; Rarotonga	
2003	Niue	round-robin	Cook Islands	Auckland; Rarotonga	
2004	Cook Islands	50–5	Niue	Rarotonga	
2005*	Cook Islands	37–12; 11–20	Papua New Guinea	Rarotonga; Port Moresby	
2006	The final of the 2006 FORU Cup between Vanuatu and Niue was cancelled.				
Oceania Cup
2007†	Papua New Guinea	46–27	Niue	Paliati, Alofi	
2008	Niue	27–5	New Caledonia	Noumea	
2009*	Papua New Guinea	29–21	Cook Islands	Port Moresby	
2011	Papua New Guinea	round-robin	Solomon Islands	Port Moresby	
2013*	Cook Islands	round-robin	Papua New Guinea	Port Moresby	
2015	Papua New Guinea	round-robin	Tahiti	Port Moresby	
2017*	Tahiti	13–9	Cook Islands	Rarotonga	
Oceania Championship
2019	Papua New Guinea	round-robin	Niue	Port Moresby	
2021	Cancelled due to COVID-19 pandemic				
2022	Papua New Guinea	round-robin	Solomon Islands	Port Moresby	

Notes:

* Part of the Rugby World Cup qualification process.
† The final of the 2007 tournament was not held until April 2008. Starting from 2009, the tournament has been held biennially.

=== Performance of Nations ===
Team records
Team	Title(s)	Runners-up	Championships won	Championships runner-up
Papua New Guinea	7	3	2002*, 2007, 2009, 2011, 2015, 2019, 2022	1996, 2005, 2013
Cook Islands	4	4	1996, 2004, 2005, 2013	2002, 2003, 2009, 2017
Niue	2	3	2003, 2008	2004, 2007, 2019
Tahiti	1	1	2017	2015
Solomon Islands	0	2	—	2011, 2022
New Caledonia	0	1	—	2008

== See also ==
- Pacific Nations Cup
- Pacific Rugby Challenge
- Oceania Sevens
- Oceania Women's Sevens Championship
- Oceania Under 20 Rugby Championship
