= Papua New Guinea Rugby Football Union =

Sports governing body in Papua New Guinea

Papua New Guinea Rugby Union
- Sport: Rugby union
- Founded: 1962; 64 years ago
- World Rugby affiliation: 1993
- Oceania Rugby affiliation: 2000
- Website: rugbypng.com.pg

The Papua New Guinea Rugby Football Union, or Rugby PNG is the governing body for rugby union in Papua New Guinea. It was established in 1962 and was affiliated to the International Rugby Board in 1993.

Rugby PNG is a full member of Oceania Rugby, which is the regional governing body for rugby in Oceania.

In September 6 2024 Rugby PNG membership was suspended after several failings by the PNG governing body to comply with orders imposed by the Regional Association of World Rugby.

== National teams ==
Papua New Guinea's national team, the Pukpuks, has not yet competed in a Rugby World Cup, but has won the FORU Oceania Cup Championship four times (as of November 2015). PNG fields teams in 7s competitions as well as 15s. The national women's 7s team was established in 2007, and won the Asia Pacific Women's Sevens Championships in 2011.

== See also ==
- Papua New Guinea national rugby union team
- Papua New Guinea national rugby sevens team
- Papua New Guinea national under-20 rugby union team
- Papua New Guinea women's national rugby union team
- Papua New Guinea women's national rugby sevens team
- Rugby union in Papua New Guinea
