= Solomon Islands Rugby Union Federation =

- Sport: Rugby union
- Founded: 1966; 60 years ago (est.)
- World Rugby affiliation: 1999
- Oceania Rugby affiliation: 2000
- Website: SIRUF

The Solomon Islands Rugby Union Federation, or SIRUF, is the governing body for rugby union in Solomon Islands. It was established in the 1960s, but only became fully affiliated to World Rugby in 1999.

The Solomon Islands Rugby Union Federation is a full member of Oceania Rugby (formerly Federation of Oceania Rugby Unions), which is the regional governing body for rugby in Oceania.

== Programs and affiliates ==
SIRUF programs include 15-a-side and 7-a-side rugby competitions in Honiara and the Provinces, a women’s tag rugby competition, as well as high school and junior rugby competitions. The SIRUF has eight affiliated associations or member unions:

- Honiara Rugby Union Association (HRUA)
- Bellona Rugby Union Association (BRUA)
- East Rennell Rugby Union Association (ERRUA)
- West Rennell Rugby Union Association (WRRUA)
- Malaita Rugby Union Association (MRUA)
- Rugby Union Makira Association (RUMA)
- Western Rugby Union Association (WRUA)
- Solomon Islands Rugby Referees Association (SIRRA)

== National teams ==
The Solomon Islands 15s national team, the Warriors, has not yet played in a world cup but has competed at the South Pacific Games (as it was called up to 2003), and more recently at the FORU Oceania Cup. Solomon Islands fields teams in 7s competitions as well as 15s. The national women's 7s team was established in 2012.

== See also ==
- Solomon Islands national rugby union team
- Solomon Islands national rugby union team (sevens)
- Solomon Islands women's national rugby union team (sevens)
- Rugby union in Solomon Islands
