= 1999 Rugby World Cup – Oceania qualification =

For the 1999 Rugby World Cup qualifiers, the Oceanian Federation was allocated three places in the final tournament and one place in the repechage.

Seven teams played in the Oceania qualifiers that were held over three stages from 1996 to 1998. Australia, Fiji and Western Samoa were the top three sides and secured their places as Oceania 1, Oceania 2 and Oceania 3, respectively, for RWC 99. Tonga qualified for the repechage tournament.

== Round 1 ==
Pos	Team	Pld	W	D	L	PF	PA	PD	Pts	Qualification
1	Cook Islands	2	2	0	0	62	19	+43	6	Advance to Second round
2	Papua New Guinea	2	1	0	1	111	28	+83	4	
3	Tahiti	2	0	0	2	6	132	−126	2	

Updated to match(es) played on 20 February 1997. Source: ESPNscrum

22 November 1996

Cook Islands	22–19	Papua New Guinea
	Report

Avarua Tereora Stadium, Rarotonga (Cook Islands)

8 February 1997

Papua New Guinea	92–6	Tahiti
	Report

Lloyd Robson Oval, Port Moresby (Papua New Guinea)

20 February 1997

Tahiti	0–40	Cook Islands
	Report

Stade Pater Te Hono Nui, Papeete (French Polynesia)

== Round 2 ==
Pos	Team	Pld	W	D	L	PF	PA	PD	Pts	Qualification
1	Fiji	2	2	0	0	73	17	+56	6	Advance to Third round
2	Tonga	2	1	0	1	78	32	+46	4	Advance to Third round
3	Cook Islands	2	0	0	2	19	121	−102	2	

Updated to match(es) played on 5 July 1997. Source: ESPNscrum

21 June 1997

Fiji	20–10	Tonga
Try: Lasagavibau; N. Little; Tuilevu; Con: N. Little; Pen: N. Little	Report	Try: Uhi; Con: Tonga; Drop: Afeaki

National Stadium, Suva (Fiji)
Referee: Glenn Wahlstrom (New Zealand)

27 June 1997

Cook Islands	7–53	Fiji
	Report	Try: Lasagavibau; L. Little; Mocelutu (3); Raiwalui; Tawake; Jone Waqabitu; Con: N. Little (5); Pen: N. Little

Avarua Tereora Stadium, Rarotonga (Cook Islands)
Referee: Steve Walsh (New Zealand)

5 July 1997

Tonga	68–12	Cook Islands
Try: Faka'osi'folau; Molitika; Ngauamo; Tatafu (2); Taumalolo (3); Tonga, Tu'ipulotu; Con: Tonga (9)	Report

Teufaiva Sport Stadium, Nukuʻalofa (Tonga)
Referee: Stuart Dickinson (Australia)

== Round 3 ==
Pos	Team	Pld	W	D	L	PF	PA	PD	Pts
1	Australia	3	3	0	0	165	33	+132	9
2	Fiji	3	2	0	1	78	99	−21	7
3	Western Samoa	3	1	0	2	59	71	−12	5
4	Tonga	3	0	0	3	35	134	−99	3

Date	Team #1	Score	Team #2	Venue
18 September 1998	Western Samoa	28–20	Tonga	Sydney, Australia
18 September 1998	Australia	66–20	Fiji	Sydney, Australia
22 September 1998	Fiji	26–18	Western Samoa	Canberra, Australia
22 September 1998	Australia	74–0	Tonga	Canberra, Australia
26 September 1998	Australia	25–13	Western Samoa	Brisbane, Australia
26 September 1998	Fiji	32–15	Tonga	Brisbane, Australia

Australia, Fiji, and Western Samoa qualified for RWC 1999, Tonga qualified for the repechage.
