= Tu Tamarua =

Cook Islands international rugby union player

- Born: 22 June 1974 (age 52)
- Height: 6 ft 1 in (1.85 m)
- Weight: 212 lb (96 kg)

Rugby union career
- Position: Flanker
Senior career
Years	Team	Apps	(Points)
2001–2002	Harlequins	12	(5)
2002–2003	Swansea		
2004	Henley Hawks		
2005	Rotherham		
2005	Pertemps Bees		
2006–2007	Pontypridd		
Provincial / State sides
Years	Team	Apps	(Points)
2003	Northland	12	(5)
Super Rugby
Years	Team	Apps	(Points)
1997–99	Reds		
International career
Years	Team	Apps	(Points)
- Cook Islands
National sevens team
Years	Team		Comps
2000	Australia 7s		

Tu Tamarua (born 22 June 1974) is a retired Cook Islands rugby union flanker.

== Career ==
Tamarua played for Queensland Reds, in Australia, from 1997 to 1999. He later played for NEC Harlequins, in England, for 2001/02 but missed a portion of the season due to injury. He then played for Swansea, in Wales, for 2002/03, moving to Northland, in New Zealand, in 2003. He moved again to Henley Hawks, in 2004, then to Rotherham, in January 2005. In June 2005, he was assigned for Pertemps Bees. His last season was at Pontypridd, in 2006/07.

Tamarua played for Australia Sevens, in 2000, but played instead for the Cook Islands national rugby union team. He was the first and still the only Cook Islands player to have been selected and played for the Pacific Islanders, in 2004.
