= Matt Faleuka =

- Born: Matthew Faleuka Tagelagi; 9 January 1979 (age 47)
- Height: 1.8 m (5 ft 11 in)
- Weight: 90 kg (14 st)

Rugby union career
Senior career
Years	Team	Apps	(Points)
2007	Parma	7	(0)
Provincial / State sides
Years	Team	Apps	(Points)
2004-2007	Northland	19	(10)
International career
Years	Team	Apps	(Points)
2011	Niue 7's	5	(5)

Matthew Faleuka Tagelagi (born 9 January 1979), known as Matt Faleuka, is a Niuean rugby union footballer. He plays as a wing and as a fullback.

== Career ==
Faleuka is one of the best players of the small island nation of Niue and is currently the capitan of Niue national rugby union team.

He played for the New Zealand Universities team in 2002 before representing Niue at the 2002 Commonwealth Games in Manchester in both Rugby Sevens and athletics. From 2003 he played for Northland. before moving to Overmach Rugby Parma in 2007
