= Tahiti national rugby union team =

Tahiti
- Nicknames: Tahiti Nui XV, Aito
- Union: Fédération Tahitienne de Rugby de Polynésie Française
- Head coach: Romi Ropati
- Captain: Tunui Anania
- Top scorer: Manuarii Richmond
- Top try scorer: Manuarii Richmond
- Home stadium: Stade Pater Te Hono Nui
First colours	Second colours

World Rugby ranking
- Current: 96 (as of 23 November 2020)

First international
- Tahiti 0–3 Wallis and Futuna (1 September 1971)

Biggest win
- Tahiti 36–12 Solomon Islands (26 August 2015)

Biggest defeat
- Tahiti 9–102 Fiji (12 September 1983)
Medal record
Pacific Games
Silver medal – second place	1995 Papeete
Bronze medal – third place	1971 Papeete
Bronze medal – third place	1987 Noumea
Pacific Mini Games
Bronze medal – third place	1985 Rarotonga

The Tahiti national rugby union team is a third tier rugby union team, representing the island of Tahiti in French Polynesia, an overseas collectivity of France. They first played in 1971 and have played numerous games to date, most against rivals Cook Islands and several against Niue. Other games have been played against Samoa, Wallis and Futuna, Papua New Guinea and Tonga. France played a match against Tahiti at the end of their 1979 tour and won 92–12. Plans to have annual "test" match series against Pacific island neighbours, New Caledonia have been put on hold, due to time, availability, finances, and coaching and refereeing resources. They have yet to qualify for the Rugby World Cup. Rugby union in Tahiti is administered by the Fédération Tahitienne de Rugby de Polynésie Française. Currently, players who have represented or played for the Tahiti national rugby team, are eligible to represent France. However, playing at a professional level can only enable this. At present there are several Tahitian professional rugby players abroad in France's Top 14 and Pro D2 professional competition.

== History ==
Rugby is greatly growing in popularity in Tahiti, but the national sport still remains soccer.

Rugby came to Tahiti via three separate streams, firstly, through the visits of British, New Zealand and Australian sailors; secondly, through the French presence (many of the main teams are still French military); and thirdly through contact with neighbouring Pacific islands, where the game is popular.

Tahiti first played the game in 1971.

It was founded in 1989 and became affiliated to the International Rugby Board in 1994.

It is also a full member of Oceania Rugby, which is the governing body for rugby union in Oceania.

Up to 2003, Tahiti played in international rugby sevens (Pacific Games) and XV-a-side, in the qualifying rounds for the Rugby World Cup.

In 2006, there were fourteen clubs in the national championship and two divisions. There were also sevens competitions, women's rugby, and under-18 rugby competitions as well.

In 2017 Tahiti won the Oceania Rugby Cup, beating their rivals Cook Islands at BCI Stadium in Rarotonga, Cook Islands by a score of 13–9.

== Uniform and colors ==
Tahiti's kit are typically All red with white tribal, designs, etc. They also can be seen using a white jersey with red tribal, designs, etc. In the past they have used all white kits with red as their secondary color, and also Red jersey with the Tahitian flag colors and black shorts.

=== Kit providers ===
Year	Kit Manufacturer	Main Shirt Sponsor
1971–1979		—
1979–1980		—
1980–1982		—
1982–1983		—
1982–1983		—
1983–1997		—
1997–2001		—
2001–2003		—
2003–2005	(Germany) Puma	—
2005–2006		—
2006–2013		—
2013–2015		—
2015–present	(France) Sportif JRH	Air Tahiti Nui

== Home grounds ==
Tahiti have played most of their home matches at Stade Pater Te Hono Nui and Stade Fautaua.

Tahiti has also hosted matches for numerous Pacific Games and Oceania Cup. They share these venues with the Tahiti national football team and club sides from both rugby and football.

Annually Tahiti hosts the Papeete International Sevens Tournament.

== Record ==
=== Oceania Cup ===
Tahiti competes in the Oceania Cup which is played against seven other Pacific nations: American Samoa, Cook Islands, New Caledonia, Niue, Papua New Guinea, Solomon Islands and Vanuatu. Tahiti has competed in the very first Oceania Cup when it was created in 1997. Since 2015, Tahiti has played 4 matches against: Papua New Guinea, Solomon Islands, American Samoa and Cook Islands recording a record of 3 wins and 1 loss. Their only loss was to 2015 Oceania Cup Champions Papua New Guinea, and until this date, it has been their only loss since then. They placed second in the standings table and were Runner-up in the tournament. In 2017 they won the Oceania Cup beating their rival Cook Islands in the 2017 Oceania Cup Championship by a score of 9–13 in Avarua, Cook Islands.

Oceania tournaments

Year	Winner	Score	Runner-up	Match venue	Refs
1996*	Cook Islands	round-robin	Papua New Guinea	Rarotonga	
2002*	Papua New Guinea	29–14; 16–21	Cook Islands	Port Moresby; Rarotonga	
2003	Niue	round-robin	Cook Islands	Auckland; Rarotonga	
2004	Cook Islands	50–5	Niue	Rarotonga	
2005*	Cook Islands	37–12; 11–20	Papua New Guinea	Rarotonga; Port Moresby	
2006	The final of the 2006 FORU Cup between Vanuatu and Niue was cancelled.				

Oceania Cup

Year	Winner	Score	Runner-up	Match venue	Refs
2007†	Papua New Guinea	46–27	Niue	Paliati, Alofi	
2008	Niue	27–5	New Caledonia	Nouméa	
2009*	Papua New Guinea	29–21	Cook Islands	Port Moresby	
2011	Papua New Guinea	round-robin	Solomon Islands	Port Moresby	
2013*	Cook Islands	round-robin	Papua New Guinea	Port Moresby	
2015	Papua New Guinea	round-robin	Tahiti	Port Moresby	
2017*	Tahiti	13–9	Cook Islands	Rarotonga	
2019	Papua New Guinea	round-robin	Niue	Port Moresby	

Notes:

* Part of the Rugby World Cup qualification process.
† The final of the 2007 tournament was not held until April 2008. Starting from 2009, the tournament has been held biennially.

=== Rugby World Cup record ===
Rugby World Cup record
Year	Qualification status
(New Zealand) (Australia) 1987	Not Invited
(England) (France) (Ireland) (Scotland) (Wales) 1991	Did Not Qualify
(South Africa) 1995	Did Not Qualify
(Wales) 1999	Did Not Qualify
(Australia) 2003	Did Not Qualify
(France) 2007	Did Not Qualify
(New Zealand) 2011	Did Not Enter
(England) 2015	Did Not Qualify
(Japan) 2019	Disqualified
(France) 2023	Suspended
(Australia) 2027	Did Not Enter
(United States) 2031	To be determined

=== Overall ===
Below is a table of the representative rugby matches played by a Tahiti national XV at test level up until 30 August 2015, updated after match with American Samoa.

Opponent	Played	Won	Lost	Drawn	% Won
American Samoa	1	1	0	0	100%
Cook Islands	9	1	8	0	11.11%
Fiji Warriors	1	0	1	0	0%
France A	1	0	1	0	0%
Italy A	1	0	1	0	0%
New Caledonia	1	1	0	0	100%
Niue	5	0	5	0	0%
Papua New Guinea	3	0	3	0	0%
Samoa	1	0	1	0	0%
Solomon Islands	3	1	2	0	33.33%
Tonga	1	0	1	0	0%
Wallis and Futuna	2	1	1	0	50%
Total	29	5	24	0	17.24%

== Players ==
Tahiti Nui XV "Aito"

Head coach: (Samoa) Romi Ropati

Player	Position	Date of birth (age)	Club
David Lahille	Hooker	20 March 1990 (age 36)	(France) L'Isle-Jourdain
Martin Taeae	Prop	24 July 1991 (age 35)	(France) Valence-d'Agen
Patrick Tevero	Prop	2 December 1993 (age 32)	(France) La Roche-sur-Yon
Angus Chales	Prop	28 November 1993 (age 32)	(French Polynesia) Pirae
Brandon Tihata	Prop	29 April 1996 (age 30)	(France) Le Mans
Loic Tautu	Forward	13 September 1983 (age 43)	(French Polynesia) Arue
Jean Tautu	Forward	19 June 2000 (age 26)	(French Polynesia)
Torea Morou	Lock	9 August 1991 (age 35)	(France) Chartres
Lehi Tematafaarere	Lock	29 July 1989 (age 37)	(France) Chartres
Andrew Vanaa	Back Row	23 December 1989 (age 36)	(France) Isle
Haley Teuira	Flanker	16 April 1986 (age 40)	(French Polynesia) Pirae
Tunui Anania (c)	Flanker	7 April 1989 (age 37)	(France) Valence-d'Agen
Manuarii Richmond	Number 8	14 April 1988 (age 38)	(French Polynesia) Faʻaʻā
Guillaume Brouqui	Scrum-half	21 July 1985 (age 41)	(France) Trélissac
Raihau Taurei	Scrum-half	28 November 1994 (age 31)	(French Polynesia) Pirae
Andoni Jimenez	Fly-half	3 August 1989 (age 37)	(France) Nantes
Anthony Tesquet	Fly-half	17 February 1986 (age 40)	(France) La Teste-de-Buch
Ganaham Huuti	Back	3 October 1997 (age 29)	(French Polynesia)
Teariki Wong Sung	Back	24 February 1993 (age 33)	(France) Le Mans
Tamahao Opeta	Centre	29 October 1997 (age 29)	(French Polynesia)
Mathieu Taulelle	Centre	23 January 1992 (age 34)	(Belgium) La Hulpe
Taitearii Mahuru	Centre	21 December 1989 (age 36)	(French Polynesia) Pirae
Vincent Perez	Wing	17 April 1989 (age 37)	(France) Tournon-d'Agenais
James Tekurio	Wing	5 May 1984 (age 42)	(France) Muret
Makalea Foliaki	Wing	24 September 1996 (age 30)	(France) Cognac Saint-Jean-d'Angély
Jean-Teiva Jacquelain	Wing	22 April 1994 (age 32)	(France) Mont-de-Marsan
François Tardieu	Fullback	1 February 1995 (age 31)	(France) Valence-d'Agen
Cedric Martin	Fullback	29 June 1989 (age 37)	(France) FCTT

=== Notable players ===
Player	Notability
Jean-Teiva Jacquelain	Played for Toulon(Academy) and La Rochelle in Top 14 and Grenoble(Pro D2), currently playing with Mont-de-Marsan in Pro D2 and France 7s
Timi Frogier	
Richard Mapuhi	Played for French Club Pau in Pro D2 (49 caps, 1990–1994)
Tauirai Bessert	
Apolosi Foliaki	
Makalea Foliaki	Played for Toulon(Academy) in Top 14, now playing with Cognac Saint-Jean-d'Angély in Nationale, he is the son of former player Apolosi Foliaki.
Tihoti Tamarono	
François Tardieu	Played for Agen(Top 14), Colomiers(Pro D2, Now plays with Valence d’agen(Fédérale 1)

Vakatini Atuahiva (JJ) Played for Counties Manukau Steeelers NZ 1982, 1991–1995: Manawatu 1984–1990 NZ:, NZ All Black Colts 1982 & 1984:

NZ Divisional XV 1993: NZ Maori All Black 1994: Cook Island 7s and XV

=== Guest players ===
These players were capped for Tahiti in an invitational match against France to celebrate Bastille Day in Papeete on 14 July 1981:

- Enrique Rodríguez (dual international for Argentina & Australia)
- Brett Codlin (All Blacks, 1980)
- Robert Kururangi (All Blacks, 1978 & Māori All Blacks, 1982)
- Tim Twigden (All Blacks, 1979–80)

== See also ==
- Rugby union in Tahiti
