= Oceania Rugby =

Sports Federation

- Founded: 2000; 26 years ago (as FORU)
- Type: Sports federation
- Members: 14 full members and 2 associate members
- Website: oceania.rugby

Oceania Rugby, previously known as the Federation of Oceania Rugby Unions (FORU), is the regional governing body for rugby union in Oceania. It was founded in 2000 to represent the interests of Oceania rugby within World Rugby, the international governing body. It presently encompasses fourteen full members and two associate members.

== Tournaments ==
Under the umbrella of World Rugby, Oceania Rugby oversees the following competitions:

- Pacific Nations Cup
- Pacific Challenge
- Oceania Rugby Men's Championship
- Oceania Rugby Men's Sevens Championship
- Oceania Rugby Women's Championship
- Oceania Rugby Women's Sevens Championship
- Oceania Rugby Under 20 Championship

== Members ==
There are 14 full members of Oceania Rugby:

- (American Samoa) American Samoa
- Australia
- Cook Islands
- Fiji
- Nauru ^{d}
- New Zealand
- New Caledonia ^{a}
- Niue
- (Papua New Guinea) Papua New Guinea
- Samoa
- (Solomon Islands) Solomon Islands
- Tonga
- Tuvalu ^{b}
- Vanuatu

There are 2 associate members of Oceania Rugby:

- (French Polynesia) Tahiti
- (Wallis and Futuna) Wallis and Futuna

== World Rugby Rankings ==
Men's World Rugby Rankings (as of 2 January 2023)
Oceania*	World Rugby	+/-	National Team	Points
1	3	Steady	New Zealand	88.98
2	6	Steady	Australia	81.8
3	11	Steady	Samoa	76.03
4	14	Steady	Fiji	74.84
5	15	Steady	Tonga	71.21
6	53	Steady	Cook Islands	45.11
7	84	Steady	Papua New Guinea	33.68
8	98	Steady	Niue	28.63
9	103	Steady	Solomon Islands	23.97
10	108	Steady	Vanuatu	15.29
11	109	Steady	American Samoa	13.53
*Local rankings based on World Rugby ranking points

Women's World Rugby Rankings (as of 2 January 2023)
Oceania*	World Rugby	+/-	National Team	Points
1	2	Steady	New Zealand	93.19
2	6	Steady	Australia	78
3	16	Steady	Fiji	58.33
4	18	Steady	Samoa	58.01
5	29	Steady	Tonga	42.79
6	49	Steady	Papua New Guinea	36.14
*Local rankings based on World Rugby ranking points

== Notes ==
^a The French Rugby Federation is the governing body affiliated with World Rugby, with a regional section for New Caledonia.

^b The Tuvalu Rugby Union is not yet affiliated with World Rugby.

^c The French Rugby Federation is the governing body affiliated with World Rugby, with a regional section for Wallis and Futuna.

^dThe Nauru Rugby Union applied for World Rugby affiliation in 2015.
