= 2007 Rugby World Cup – repechage qualification =

During the 2007 Rugby World Cup qualification, there were two repechage positions available for the finals tournament.

== Repechage 1 ==
=== Round 1 ===
Team 1	Agg.	Team 2	1st leg	2nd leg
Morocco	20–26	Portugal	5–10	15–16

20 January 2007

Morocco	5–10	Portugal

Casablanca, Morocco

27 January 2007

Portugal	16–15	Morocco

Lisbon, Portugal

=== Round 2 ===
Team 1	Agg.	Team 2	1st leg	2nd leg
Portugal	24–23	Uruguay	12–5	12–18

10 March 2007

Portugal	12–5	Uruguay

Lisbon, Portugal

24 March 2007

Uruguay	18–12	Portugal

Montevideo, Uruguay

== Repechage 2 ==
Team 1	Score	Team 2
Tonga	85–3	South Korea

10 February 2007

Tonga	85–3	South Korea

Auckland, New Zealand
