= Nauru national rugby union team =

Nauru
- Union: Nauru Rugby Union
- Coach: Dominic Tabuna
- Captain: Damon Adeang
- Most caps: Multiple players (3)
- Top scorer: Fulton Hogan Amram; Myer Temaki (5)
Team kit

First international
- Papua New Guinea 89 – 5 Nauru (Port Moresby, Papua New Guinea; 23 August 2019)

Largest win
- None

Largest defeat
- Papua New Guinea 89 – 5 Nauru (Port Moresby, Papua New Guinea; 23 August 2019); Niue 89 – 5 Nauru (Port Moresby, Papua New Guinea; 30 August 2019)

The Nauru national rugby union team is the national team of the third tier rugby union playing nation of Nauru. The team made its full international debut in the 2019 Oceania Cup. Rugby union in Nauru is administered by the Nauru Rugby Union.

Nauru has yet to qualify for the Rugby World Cup.

== Results ==
Note the winning team is given first.

=== 2019 Oceania Cup ===
- Papua New Guinea 89–5 Nauru
- Solomon Islands 61–7 Nauru
- Niue 89–5 Nauru

== Current squad ==
2019 Oceania Cup

1. Sherlock Denuga – Prop
2. Ashly Scott Dagan Kaierua – Hooker
3. Jake Debao – Prop
4. Abraham Eroni Itsimaera – Lock
5. Dunstall Harris – Lock
6. Johnson Scotty – Flanker
7. Fulton Hogan Amram – Flanker
8. Damon Ivorab Adeang – Number 8
9. Zacharias Detenamo – Scrum-half
10. Kristidas Merike -Fly-half
11. Elkodawn Dagiaro – Wing
12. Lloyd Mark Dero Vunipola – Centre
13. Romanus Hartman – Centre
14. Junior Agiangang – Wing
15. Rasmussen Dowabobo – Fullback
16. Dean Kepae – Substitute
17. Felix Kepae – Substitute
18. Zechariah Temaki – Substitute
19. Kane Solomon – Substitute
20. Denuga Vito – Substitute
21. Lockett Mau – Substitute
22. Myer Temaki – Substitute
23. Otto Adam – Substitute

== Sponsors ==
- (Australia) Team Spirit (technical sponsor)
- Nauru Airlines
- (Jamaica) Digicel
- (Australia) Australian Aid

== See also ==
- Rugby union in Nauru
