= Wallis and Futuna national rugby union team =

Wallis and Futuna
- Union: Wallis & Futuna Rugby Union (WFRU)

First international
- Papua New Guinea 54–5 Wallis and Futuna (1 December 1966)

Biggest win
- Tahiti 0–3 Wallis and Futuna (1 September 1971)

Biggest defeat
- Papua New Guinea 54–5 Wallis and Futuna (1 December 1966)

The Wallis and Futuna national rugby union team represents Wallis and Futuna in rugby union. The team's first international match was against Papua New Guinea, who beat them 54–5 in 1966. Wallis and Futuna recorded their first, and as yet only, victory against Tahiti, winning 3–0 away from home in 1971. The team has not played since 1971 and is currently inactive.

Rugby sevens is now the preferred rugby format in Wallis and Futuna.

== See also ==
- Rugby union in Wallis and Futuna
- Wallis and Futuna Rugby Committee
