= Vanuatu national rugby union team =

Vanuatu
- Nickname: Tuskers
- Union: Vanuatu Rugby Football Union
- Head coach: Ishmael Kalsakau

World Rugby ranking
- Current: 112 (as of 4 November 2024)
- Highest: 108 (2022)
- Lowest: 112 (2024)

First international
- New Hebrides 18–18 Wallis and Futuna (1966-12-01)

Biggest win
- Vanuatu 6–0 Wallis and Futuna (1966-12-01)

Biggest defeat
- Papua New Guinea 97–3 Vanuatu (2005-08-20)
Medal record
Pacific Games
Bronze medal – third place	1966 Noumea

The Vanuatu national rugby union team represents Vanuatu in the sport of rugby union. The team is classified as a tier three nation by the International Rugby Board (IRB), and has yet to qualify for a Rugby World Cup. Its international debut was in 1966. It became affiliated with World Rugby in 1999. The team is nicknamed the Tuskers, after the pig tusks prized as currency in some parts of the country. The tusks also appear on the country's flag.

== History ==
Vanuatu was involved in the Oceania qualifying tournaments for the 2007 Rugby World Cup in France. It was a part of the Round 1a group, with the Solomon Islands and Papua New Guinea. It won its first match at home against the Solomon Islands, lost the second match away to Papua New Guinea 97 to 3, and did not proceed to the next round.

== Record ==
=== Rugby World Cup record ===
Rugby World Cup record
Year	Qualification status
(New Zealand) (Australia) 1987	Not Invited
(England) (France) (Ireland) (Scotland) (Wales) 1991	Did Not Enter
(South Africa) 1995	Did Not Enter
(Wales) 1999	Did Not Enter
(Australia) 2003	Did Not Qualify
(France) 2007	Did Not Qualify
(New Zealand) 2011	Did Not Qualify
(England) 2015	Did Not Enter
(Japan) 2019	Did Not Enter
(France) 2023	Did Not Enter
(Australia) 2027	Did Not Enter
(United States) 2031	To be determined

=== Overall ===
Below is a table of the representative rugby matches played by a Vanuatu national XV at test level up until 10 November 2022, updated after match with Solomon Islands.

Opponent	Played	Won	Lost	Drawn	% Won
New Caledonia	4	1	3	0	25%
Niue	2	0	2	0	0%
Papua New Guinea	7	0	7	0	0%
Solomon Islands	5	1	4	0	20%
Total	18	2	16	0	11.11%

In late 2012, due to management issues, the Vanuatu rugby team was suspended by the IRB for failure to report about the country's use of money and development of the sport within the country.

== See also ==
- FORU Oceania Cup
- 2007 Rugby World Cup – Oceania qualification
- Vanuatu Rugby Football Union
- Rugby union in Vanuatu
- Vanuatu national under-20 rugby union team
