= Solomon Islands national rugby union team =

Solomon Islands
- Union: Solomon Islands Rugby Union Federation
- Head coach: Corey Chapman
First colours

World Rugby ranking
- Current: 107 (as of 4 November 2024)
- Highest: 69 (2011)
- Lowest: 107 (2024)

First international
- Papua New Guinea 23–5 Solomon Islands (18 August 1969)

Biggest win
- Solomon Islands 61–7 Nauru (27 August 2019)

Biggest defeat
- Solomon Islands 3–113 Fiji (21 August 1969)
Medal record
Pacific Games
Bronze medal – third place	1969 Port Moresby
Bronze medal – third place	1991 Port Moresby

The Solomon Islands national rugby union team represent Solomon Islands in the sport of rugby union.

They played their first internationals as part of the 3rd South Pacific Games in Port Moresby, beginning with a 5–23 loss to host team Papua New Guinea on 18 August 1969. Their first wins came soon after; 36–0 over Wallis and Futuna and 28–12 against New Caledonia to win the bronze medal. Since then have played in only a small number of internationals, but did win bronze again in Port Moresby at the 9th South Pacific Games.

Solomon Islands have yet to qualify for the Rugby World Cup finals. The team did take part in the qualifying tournaments in Oceania for the 2003 Rugby World Cup in Australia, and the 2007 Rugby World Cup in France, but did not end up qualifying.

== History ==
In November and December 2011, Solomon Islands competed in the Eastern Regional Pool of the 2011 FORU Oceania Cup. All matches were played at Lloyd Robson Oval in Port Moresby. In their first match, on 29 November, Solomon Islands recorded a notable 22–19 victory over the more fancied former champions Niue. This was followed by a 33–15 loss to host nation, Papua New Guinea. In their final pool match, Solomon Islands defeated Vanuatu 48–20 to finish second in the pool, behind Papua New Guinea. This victory set a new record winning margin for the Solomon Islands, eclipsing the previous best of 11–3, also against Vanuatu, in 2001. By virtue of their wins at the tournament, Solomon Islands climbed to an all-time high of 69th position on the IRB World Rankings, overtaking Niue in the process.

== Record ==
=== Rugby World Cup record ===
Rugby World Cup record
Year	Qualification status
(New Zealand) (Australia) 1987	Not Invited
(England) (France) (Ireland) (Scotland) (Wales) 1991	Did Not Enter
(South Africa) 1995	Did Not Enter
(Wales) 1999	Did Not Enter
(Australia) 2003	Did Not Qualify
(France) 2007	Did Not Qualify
(New Zealand) 2011	Did Not Enter
(England) 2015	Did Not Qualify
(Japan) 2019	Did Not Qualify
(France) 2023	Did Not Enter
(Australia) 2027	Did Not Enter
(United States) 2031	To be determined

=== Overall ===
Below is a table of the representative rugby matches played by a Solomon Islands national XV at test level up until 10 November 2022, updated after match with Vanuatu.

Opponent	Played	Won	Lost	Drawn	% Won
American Samoa	2	0	2	0	0%
Cook Islands	1	0	1	0	0%
Fiji	2	0	2	0	0%
Nauru	1	1	0	0	100%
New Caledonia	1	0	1	0	0%
Niue	3	2	1	0	66.67%
Papua New Guinea	10	1	9	0	10%
Samoa	2	0	2	0	0%
Tahiti	4	3	1	0	75%
Tonga	1	0	1	0	0%
Vanuatu	5	4	1	0	80%
Total	32	11	21	0	34.38%

== Current squad ==
On July 30, the 31-man squad was selected for the 2019 Oceania Rugby Cup.

Player	Position	Date of birth (age)	Club
Lavern Tuhatangata	Hooker		(Solomon Islands) Matangiki Rugby Club
Rodney Kavamauri	Hooker	18 February 1983 (age 43)	(Solomon Islands) TIA Rugby Club
Kasoa Watkin	Prop	22 August 1984 (age 42)	(Solomon Islands) TIA Rugby Club
Micky Tufunga	Prop		(Solomon Islands) TIA Rugby Club
Sifina Rukia	Prop		(Solomon Islands) Islanders Rugby Club
Huddy Hou	Prop	18 April 1988 (age 38)	(Solomon Islands) Matangiki Rugby Club
Edward Tangimoana	Prop		(Solomon Islands) Matangiki Rugby Club
Ezekiel Mana	Prop		(Solomon Islands) Islanders Rugby Club
Sunigeva Nasiu	Lock		(Solomon Islands) Avaiki Rugby Club
Jack Akao	Lock		(Solomon Islands) Henderson Hammerheads
Eddie Aete'e	Lock		(Solomon Islands) Sosa Rugby Club
Kevin Muna	Lock		(Solomon Islands) TIA Rugby Club
Sonney Delaiverata	Lock		(Solomon Islands) Henderson Hammerheads
Daniel Saomatangi	Flanker		(Solomon Islands) Avaiki Rugby Club
PJ Lakoa	Flanker		(Solomon Islands) Diesel Rugby Club
Saga Sade Samani	Flanker		(Solomon Islands) Henderson Hammerheads
Vince Tohuika	Flanker		(Solomon Islands) Matangiki Rugby Club
Castro Teaheniu	Number 8		(Solomon Islands) Matangiki Rugby Club
Paul Tema	Number 8		(Australia) University of Queensland
Felix Galo	Scrum-half		(Solomon Islands) Henderson Hammerheads
Charlie Tenge	Scrum-half		(Solomon Islands) Police Rugby Club
Ronnie Saomatangi	Fly-half		(Solomon Islands) TIA Rugby Club
Edwin John	Fly-half		(Solomon Islands) Matangiki Rugby Club
Roman Tongaka	Centre		(Solomon Islands) Avaiki Rugby Club
Laban Taika	Centre		(Solomon Islands) Matangiki Rugby Club
Moana Tepuke	Centre		(Solomon Islands) Matangiki Rugby Club
Bobby Sade	Centre		(Solomon Islands) Henderson Hammerheads
Timo Sanga	Wing		(Solomon Islands) Avaiki Rugby Club
Eddie Sanga	Wing		(Solomon Islands) Avaiki Rugby Club
Chris Saru	Wing	23 June 1993 (age 33)	(Solomon Islands) Henderson Hammerheads
Mathew Qwaina	Fullback		(Solomon Islands) Henderson Hammerheads
Moses Sinugamoana	Fullback		(Solomon Islands) Avaiki Rugby Club
