= Papua New Guinea national rugby union team =

Papua New Guinea
- Nickname: The Pukpuks
- Union: Papua New Guinea Rugby Football Union
- Head coach: Sydney Wesley
First colours

World Rugby ranking
- Current: 86 (as of 4 November 2024)
- Highest: 84 (2023)

First international
- Papua New Guinea 47–3 New Hebrides (1966-12-01)

Biggest win
- Papua New Guinea 97–3 Vanuatu (20 August 2005)

Biggest defeat
- Samoa 115–7 Papua New Guinea (Apia, Samoa, 11 July 2009)
Medal record
Pacific Games
Gold medal – first place	1966 Noumea
Silver medal – second place	1969 Port Moresby

The Papua New Guinea national rugby union team, nicknamed the Pukpuks, (Tok Pisin for 'crocodiles'), played its first international in 1966, defeating Vanuatu 47–3. Papua New Guinea have not so far qualified for a Rugby World Cup. They participated in the Oceania World Cup qualifying tournaments for the 2007, 2011 and 2015 World Cups, but did not qualify.

== History ==
Papua New Guinea made their international rugby debut at the South Pacific Games in 1966. The team won all three matches against New Hebrides, New Caledonia and Wallis and Futuna to win the gold medal.

As hosts for the following games held at Port Moresby in 1969, Papua New Guinea defeated New Caledonia again and the Solomon Islands but lost to the eventual gold medalist Fiji to finish with the silver medal.

Papua New Guinea entered a qualifying tournament for the 1999 Rugby World Cup in Wales. Papua New Guinea competed in Round 1 of the Oceania qualifying tournament. Although they defeated Tahiti, they lost 22–19 against the Cook Islands. They finished second in the final standings.

They played in qualifying tournaments for the 2003 Rugby World Cup in Australia, playing in Round 1b of the Oceania tournament. Papua New Guinea defeated both the Solomon Islands and Vanuatu to advance through to Round 3. In Round 3 Papua New Guinea faced the Cook Islands to advance to Round 4. In the final round, for repechage qualification, Papua New Guinea were defeated by Tonga.

In attempting to qualify for the 2007 Rugby World Cup in France, Papua New Guinea started out in Round 1a of the tournament. Papua New Guinea defeated the Solomon Islands and Vanuatu to finish at the top of the standings to move through to Round 2. In Round 2 the Cook Islands went through to Round 4.

The Pukpuks won the inaugural Federation of Oceania Rugby Union (FORU) Cup (2007), defeating Niue in the final by a score of 46–19. In the 2009 Oceania Nations Cup, Papua New Guinea managed to beat Vanuatu 86–12 in the semifinals and in the final, beat Cook Islands 29–12. They then went on to play Samoa in the Oceania Qualification for the 2011 Rugby World Cup where they got beaten 115–7 away and 73–12 at home. They were unable to qualify for the 2011 Rugby World Cup.

Papua New Guinea hosted the 2011 edition of the FORU Oceania Cup, winning the tournament by defeating Vanuatu (78–3), Solomon Islands (33–15) and Niue (36–7).

== Rugby World Cup record ==
Rugby World Cup record
Year	Qualification status
(New Zealand) (Australia) 1987	Not Invited
(England) (France) (Ireland) (Scotland) (Wales) 1991	Did Not Enter
(South Africa) 1995	Did Not Qualify
(Wales) 1999	Did Not Qualify
(Australia) 2003	Did Not Qualify
(France) 2007	Did Not Qualify
(New Zealand) 2011	Did Not Qualify
(England) 2015	Did Not Qualify
(Japan) 2019	Withdrew
(France) 2023	Did Not Qualify
(Australia) 2027	Did Not Enter
(United States) 2031	To be determined

== Overall Records ==
Below is table of the representative rugby matches played by a Papua New Guinea national XV at test level up until 20 April 2020.

Team	Mat	Won	Lost	Draw	Win%	Last played	For	Aga	Diff
American Samoa	1	1	0	0	100%	2015	36	22	+14
Cook Islands	7	3	4	0	42.86%	2013	153	163	−10
Fiji	3	0	3	0	0%	1979	3	253	−250
Hong Kong	3	0	3	0	0%	2016	26	79	−53
Nauru	1	1	0	0	100%	2019	89	7	+82
New Caledonia	3	2	1	0	66.67%	1979	59	25	+34
New Hebrides	1	1	0	0	100%	1966	47	3	+44
Niue	3	3	0	0	100%	2019	111	44	+67
Russia	1	0	1	0	0%	2016	19	49	−30
Samoa	2	0	2	0	0%	2009	19	188	−169
Solomon Islands	8	8	0	0	100%	2019	284	97	+187
Sri Lanka	2	2	0	0	100%	1992	46	35	+11
Tahiti	3	3	0	0	100%	2015	163	48	+115
Tonga	2	0	2	0	0%	2002	26	135	−105
Vanuatu	5	5	0	0	100%	2011	339	28	+311
Wallis and Futuna	2	2	0	0	100%	1969	100	5	+95
Zimbabwe	1	0	1	0	0%	2016	11	38	−27
Total	50	32	18	0	64%	–	1564	1271	+293

== Squad ==
Squad to Oceania Rugby Men's Championship (12 October 2022):

- Aidan Toua - QRU
- Jordan Seladi (Capital Rugby Union)
- Tony Sipa (Capital Rugby Union)
- Freddy Andale (Capital Rugby Union)
- Mick Rau (Capital Rugby Union)
- Caleb Nipal (Capital Rugby Union)
- Eddie Nipal (Capital Rugby Union)
- George Wai (Capital Rugby Union)
- Barol Homerang (Capital Rugby Union)
- Jaran Pittan (Capital Rugby Union)
- Ron Butler (Capital Rugby Union)
- Kenneth Vagi (Capital Rugby Union)
- William Kalai (Capital Rugby Union)
- Anu Karai (Capital Rugby Union)
- Jonah Tokiong (Capital Rugby Union)
- Blake Mindipi (Capital Rugby Union)
- Francis Miria (Morobe)
- Cameron Wai (Morobe)
- Laho Posu (Morobe)
- Lindsay Yobone (Morobe)
- Paul Nelson (Morobe)
- Mafu Kalas (Morobe)
- Elias Patala (Morobe)
- Eddie Carl Soor (NCD Rugby Union)
- Ezekiel Dauko (NCD Rugby Union)
- Brendon Yenmoro (NCD Rugby Union)
- Jackson Waingut (NCD Rugby Union)
- Keith Frizzel (NCD Rugby Union)
- George Mark (East New Britain)
- Hosea Alfred (East New Britain)

== See also ==
- Rugby union in Papua New Guinea
