= Niue national rugby union team =

Niue
- Nickname: To'a Niue XV
- Union: Niue Rugby Football Union
- Head coach: Metric Ikitoelagi
- Captain: Luke Gibb
First colours

World Rugby ranking
- Current: 101 (as of 29 January 2024)
- Highest: 94 (23 November 2020)

First international
- Fiji 124–4 Niue (Apia, Samoa; 10 September 1983)

Biggest win
- Niue 87–0 Nauru (Port Moresby, Papua New Guinea; 31 August 2019)

Biggest defeat
- Fiji 124–4 Niue (Apia, Samoa; 10 September 1983)

The Niue Island national rugby union team is the national team of the third tier rugby union playing nation of Niue Island. The team first started playing in 1983 in mainly competes in the Oceania Cup, which it won in 2008. Rugby union in Niue Island is administered by the Niue Rugby Football Union.

== Results ==
Niue's first international match was at the 1983 South Pacific Games in Suva against hosts Fiji. The Niueans managed to score a try against the eventual tournament winners but were defeated by 124–4. The team found success in the 2008 Oceania Cup, defeating New Caledonia by 27–5 in the final on 1 September 2008.

As of 29 May 2013, Niue was ranked 71st in the IRB world rankings. The team had played 10 international matches by that time, four against the Cook Islands and three against Tahiti. Other matches have been against Fiji, New Caledonia and Vanuatu.

== Players ==
Some of Niue's best players are professionals in New Zealand. Former Niue captain Matt Faleuka played for Northland before moving to Italian club Overmach Rugby Parma in 2007.

While the Niue and the Cook Islands teams did not compete in the Pacific Tri-Nations competition, they did supply players to the squad for the Pacific Islanders' tour in 2004 (but not in 2006).

The Niue sevens team have been active in the IRB World Sevens and the Commonwealth Games.

== Record ==
=== Rugby World Cup record ===
Rugby World Cup record
Year	Qualification status
(New Zealand) (Australia) 1987	Not Invited
(England) (France) (Ireland) (Scotland) (Wales) 1991	Did Not Enter
(South Africa) 1995	Did Not Enter
(Wales) 1999	Did Not Enter
(Australia) 2003	Did Not Qualify
(France) 2007	Did Not Qualify
(New Zealand) 2011	Did Not Qualify
(England) 2015	Did Not Qualify
(Japan) 2019	Did Not Qualify
(France) 2023	Did Not Qualify
(Australia) 2027	Did Not Enter
(United States) 2031	To be determined

=== Overall ===
Below is a table of the representative rugby matches played by a Greece national XV at test level up until 31 August 2019, updated after match with Nauru.

Opponent	Played	Won	Lost	Drawn	% Won
Cook Islands	7	2	5	0	28.57%
Fiji	1	0	1	0	0%
Nauru	1	1	0	0	100%
New Caledonia	2	2	0	0	100%
Papua New Guinea	3	0	3	0	0%
Solomon Islands	3	1	2	0	33.33%
Tahiti	5	5	0	0	100%
Vanuatu	2	2	0	0	100%
Total	24	13	11	0	54.17%

== Current squad ==
The squad was selected for the 2019 Oceania Rugby Cup.

Player	Position	Club
Luke Gibb (c)	Hooker	(New Zealand) Paremata-Plimmerton RFC
Matthew Jackson	Hooker	(Australia) Krueger Crocs
Samuel Ikihega	Prop	(Australia) Moorabbin Rams
Stephen Tapuosi	Prop	(United States) Chicago Lions
Morre Tukuniu	Prop	(Niue) Southern Marlins
Maloney Taleni	Prop	(New Zealand) Otahuhu RFC
Pierce Makaola	Lock	(Australia) Northern Panthers
George Pamatatau	Lock	(Australia) North Brisbane Rugby Club
Auston Puhotau	Lock	(Australia) North Brisbane Rugby Club
Sagele Harrison	Lock	(Australia) Coomera Crushers
Quinton Strickland	Flanker	(Australia) Footscray R.U.F.C.
Togatule Kose	Flanker	(Australia) Mareeba Gladiators
Nick Laufoli	Flanker	(New Zealand) Kava Club
Randy Liuvaie	Number 8	(New Zealand) Freyberg Old Boys RFC
Khalum Halo	Scrum-half	(New Zealand) Manukau Rovers RFC
Gavin Patuki	Scrum-half	(New Zealand) Southern Cross
Shaun-Adam Atamu	Fly-half	(New Zealand) Bombay R.F.C.
David Pamatatau	Fly-half	(Australia) Coomera Crushers
Anthony Liuvaie	Centre	(New Zealand) Old Boys University RFC
Lepau Feau-Fuhiniu	Centre	(New Zealand) Old Boys University RFC
Dawson Mele	Centre	(New Zealand) Southern Cross
Cyruss Payne	Wing	(New Zealand) Marist Saints
Tui Leatigaga	Wing	(Australia) Camden Rugby
Dee Saele Nanai	Wing	(New Zealand) Manukau Rovers
Tonga Tongotongo	Wing	(New Zealand) Manukau Rovers
Kegan Tuhega	Fullback	(Australia) Pine Rivers Bears Junior League Club
Logan Norman	Fullback	(Wales) Bangor RFC

== See also ==
- Rugby union in Niue
