= Cook Islands national rugby union team =

Cook Islands
- Union: Cook Islands Rugby Union
- Head coach: Nathan Robinson
- Captain: Tupou Sopoaga
First colours

World Rugby ranking
- Current: 66 (as of 20 November 2025)

First international
- Western Samoa 24–18 Cook Islands (1 September 1971)

Biggest win
- Cook Islands 86–0 Tahiti (2 June 2001)

Biggest defeat
- Fiji 108–6 Cook Islands (28 June 2014)
Medal record
Pacific Games
| Silver medal – second place | 1971 Papeete |
| Silver medal – second place | 1987 Noumea |
Pacific Mini Games
| Gold medal – first place | 1985 Rarotonga |

The Cook Islands is a third tier rugby union playing nation. They began playing international rugby in early 1971. Thus far, the Cook Islands have not made an appearance at any of the World Cups.

== History ==
In 1924 a scratch team of Rarotongan boys, including the late Sir Albert Henry, played the All Black Invincibles on their way to the United Kingdom. The game was drawn 0–0.

The Cook Islands played their first official international on September 1, 1971 against Western Samoa, losing 24 points to 18. The Cook Islands went on to win against Wallis and Futuna the next day and then lose again to Samoa the day after.

The next time the Cook Islands played was nine years later in 1980, in a close game against a touring Italian side; the Cook Islands won by 15 – 6. Three years later they again played Samoa, again losing. The next match for the Islanders wasn't until 1996, when they played Papua New Guinea. Since then, they play regularly against them and fellow Pacific sides Niue and Tahiti.

While Niue and the Cook Islands are not members of the Pacific Tri-Nations competition, they can supply players for the Pacific Islanders'. The first and still sole player from Cook Islands to have represented the Pacific Islanders was Tu Tamarua, in 2004.

The best Cook Islands rugby players often play in New Zealand where there is a large Cook Island population.

The Cook Islands entered the play-off round 4 against Tonga for a berth at the 2007 Rugby World Cup, but suffered heavy losses by 77–10 at home and 90–0 away, in 2006, being eliminated.

The Cook Islands entered recently Oceania Cup, but were surprisingly eliminated by Niue who beat them 18–7 at Rarotonga.

The 2013 Oceania Cup hosted by Papua New Guinea saw the Cook Islands record wins over Tahiti, Solomon Islands and the final hosts Papua New Guinea. Cook Islands played and lost to Fiji in 2014 for the last spot (Oceania 1) at the 2015 Rugby World Cup.

== Overall Records ==
Below is table of the representative rugby matches played by an Cook Island's national XV at test level up until 25 July 2021.

| Team | Mat | Won | Lost | Draw | Win% | Last played | For | Aga | Diff |
|---|---|---|---|---|---|---|---|---|---|
| Fiji | 2 | 0 | 2 | 0 | 0% | 2014 | 3 | 161 | –148 |
| Hong Kong | 2 | 0 | 2 | 0 | 0% | 2018 | 3 | 77 | –74 |
| Italy | 1 | 1 | 0 | 0 | 100% | 1980 | 15 | 6 | +9 |
| New Caledonia | 2 | 2 | 0 | 0 | 100% | 2003 | 82 | 13 | +69 |
| Māori All Blacks | 1 | 0 | 1 | 0 | 0% | 1992 | 17 | 29 | –12 |
| Niue | 7 | 5 | 2 | 0 | 71.43% | 2009 | 193 | 75 | +118 |
| Papua New Guinea | 7 | 4 | 3 | 0 | 57.14% | 2013 | 163 | 153 | +10 |
| Samoa | 3 | 0 | 3 | 0 | 0% | | 31 | 102 | –71 |
| Solomon Islands | 1 | 1 | 0 | 0 | 100% | 2013 | 39 | 12 | +27 |
| Tahiti | 9 | 7 | 2 | 0 | 77.78% | 2017 | 419 | 128 | +291 |
| Tonga | 4 | 0 | 4 | 0 | 0% | 2021 | 32 | 289 | –257 |
| Wallis and Futuna | 1 | 1 | 0 | 0 | 100% | 1971 | 29 | 18 | +11 |
| Total | 40 | 21 | 19 | 0 | 52.5% | – | 1036 | 1063 | -27 |

=== Rugby World Cup record ===
Rugby World Cup record
| Year | Qualification status |
|---|---|
| (New Zealand) (Australia) 1987 | Not Invited |
| (England) (France) (Ireland) (Scotland) (Wales) 1991 | Did Not Enter |
| (South Africa) 1995 | Did Not Enter |
| (Wales) 1999 | Did Not Qualify |
| (Australia) 2003 | Did Not Qualify |
| (France) 2007 | Did Not Qualify |
| (New Zealand) 2011 | Did Not Qualify |
| (England) 2015 | Did Not Qualify |
| (Japan) 2019 | Did Not Qualify |
| (France) 2023 | Did Not Qualify |
| (Australia) 2027 | Did Not Enter |
| (United States) 2031 | To be determined |

== Current squad ==
Cook Islands squad for the 2023 Rugby World Cup Oceania qualifiers.

- Head Coach: (Cook Islands) Nathan Robinson

| Player | Position | Date of birth (age) | Caps | Club/province |
|---|---|---|---|---|
| Benjamin Tou | Hooker | 15 February 1988 (aged 31) | 1 | (New Zealand) Waipu Rugby Club |
| James Pakoti | Hooker | 8 September 2000 (age 26) | | (New Zealand) Martinborough Rugby Club |
| Ezekiel Sopoaga | Prop | 29 June 2000 (age 26) | 1 | (New Zealand) Petone |
| Alex Matapo | Prop | 26 May 1982 (aged 37) | | (New Zealand) Ponsonby |
| Antonio Ripata | Prop | 28 August 1996 (age 30) | 1 | (New Zealand) Auckland Rugby Football Club |
| Tuakana Paitai | Prop | 28 November 1998 (age 27) | 2 | (New Zealand) Morrinsville |
| Toru Katuke | Prop | 27 November 1999 (age 26) | | (Cook Islands) Avatiu Nikao Eels |
| Tahquinn Hansen | Lock | 19 October 1995 (age 31) | 1 | (New Zealand) Grammar Tech |
| James Kora | Lock | 18 April 1994 (age 32) | 4 | (New Zealand) Kerikeri Rugby Club |
| Oneal Rongo | Lock | 28 November 2000 (age 25) | 4 | (New Zealand) Kerikeri Rugby Club |
| Josh Caffrey | Flanker | 20 December 2000 (age 25) | | (Cook Islands) Avatiu Nikao Eels |
| Jardine Pumati Chung-Ching | Flanker | 28 October 1996 (age 30) | 1 | (New Zealand) Hastings Rugby Sports |
| Francis Smith | Flanker | 5 May 1985 (age 41) | | (Cook Islands) Arorangi Bears |
| Tupou Sopoaga (c) | Flanker | 5 June 1992 (age 34) | 1 | (New Zealand) Petone |
| Robert Heather | Flanker | 25 May 1992 (age 34) | 3 | (Cook Islands) Arorangi Bears |
| Leroy Henry-Jack | Number 8 | 4 April 1993 (age 33) | 1 | (New Zealand) Pakuranga United |
| Toka Sopoaga | Scrum-half | 16 August 1994 (age 32) | 1 | (New Zealand) Harbour Rugby Club Otago |
| Allan Toki | Scrum-half | 26 August 1994 (age 32) | | (New Zealand) Temuka Rugby Club |
| Te Puhi Rudolph | Fly-half | 28 November 1994 (age 31) | 1 | (New Zealand) Muriwhenua Rugby Club |
| Reece Joyce | Fly-half | 29 March 1992 (age 34) | | (New Zealand) Bombay Rugby Club |
| Leon Ellia-Niukore | Centre | 28 November 1997 (age 28) | 1 | (Australia) Souths Rugby CLub |
| Junior Taia | Centre | 16 October 2000 (age 26) | 1 | (New Zealand) Shirley Rugby Club |
| Gideon Kautai | Centre | 1 December 2000 (age 25) | 1 | (New Zealand) Hastings Rugby Sports |
| Tevita Niusama | Wing | 8 August 2001 (age 25) | 1 | (Cook Islands) Avatiu Nikao Eels |
| Materua Tupou | Wing | 28 November 1990 (age 35) | 1 | (New Zealand) Pirates Old Boys |
| Matamanea Matapakia | Fullback | 13 January 1994 (age 32) | 3 | (New Zealand) Geraldine Rugby Club |
| Mataroa Maui | Fullback | 15 April 1993 (age 33) | | (New Zealand) Excelsior Rugby Club |

== Notable players ==
- Tommy Hayes
- Albert Henry
- Koiatu Koiatu
- Paul Koteka
- Dave Rennie
- Tu Tamarua
- Stan Wright
- Mike Beckham
- Daniel Devereaux
- Roger Franklin Sharpe

== See also ==
- Rugby union in the Cook Islands
- Cook Islands national rugby sevens team
