= List of Samoa national rugby union players =

List of Samoa national rugby union players is a list of people who have played for the Samoa national rugby union team. The list only includes players who have played in a match recognized by the Samoa Rugby Union as a test match, whether it was played under the governing body's current name or the "Western Samoa Rugby Football Union" name (as it was originally established in 1924). (In rugby union, any match of a nation's senior side recognized as a test by its national governing body is included in test statistics for that nation.) Players that were first capped during the same match are listed in order of those that began in the starting line up before replacements and then in alphabetical order by surname. Note that the "position" column lists the position at which the player made his test debut and not necessarily the position for which he is best known. A position in parentheses indicates that the player debuted as a substitute.

As of April 2019, the only member of the national rugby union team to have been inducted into the World Rugby Hall of Fame is Brian Lima (inducted in 2011).

== List ==
| No. | Name | Position | Date of debut | Opposition | Competition | Venue | Ref. |
|---|---|---|---|---|---|---|---|
| 1 | Agnew | Not recorded | Aug 18, 1924 | Fiji | Test match | Apia Park; Apia | |
| 2 | Aitofele | Not recorded | Aug 18, 1924 | Fiji | Test match | Apia Park; Apia | |
| 3 | T. Allen | Fullback | Aug 18, 1924 | Fiji | Test match | Apia Park; Apia | |
| 4 | Atiga | Not recorded | Aug 18, 1924 | Fiji | Test match | Apia Park; Apia | |
| 5 | Charles Capper | Not recorded | Aug 18, 1924 | Fiji | Test match | Apia Park; Apia | |
| 6 | I. Imo | Not recorded | Aug 18, 1924 | Fiji | Test match | Apia Park; Apia | |
| 7 | Iupati | Not recorded | Aug 18, 1924 | Fiji | Test match | Apia Park; Apia | |
| 8 | A. Macdonald | Wing | Aug 18, 1924 | Fiji | Test match | Apia Park; Apia | |
| 9 | Harry Moors (c) | Flanker | Aug 18, 1924 | Fiji | Test match | Apia Park; Apia | |
| 10 | P. Papaliʻi | Not recorded | Aug 18, 1924 | Fiji | Test match | Apia Park; Apia | |
| 11 | I. Railey | Lock | Aug 18, 1924 | Fiji | Test match | Apia Park; Apia | |
| 12 | E. Saʻaga | Scrum-half | Aug 18, 1924 | Fiji | Test match | Apia Park; Apia | |
| 13 | Sinaumea | Not recorded | Aug 18, 1924 | Fiji | Test match | Apia Park; Apia | |
| 14 | Toni | Center | Aug 18, 1924 | Fiji | Test match | Apia Park; Apia | |
| 15 | Tualai | Not recorded | Aug 18, 1924 | Fiji | Test match | Apia Park; Apia | |
| 16 | Tagimanu | Not recorded | Sep 19, 1924 | Fiji | Test match | Apia Park; Apia | |
| 17 | Tufele | Scrum-half | Sep 19, 1924 | Fiji | Test match | Apia Park; Apia | |
| 18 | Ah Sue | Not recorded | Sep 21, 1928 | Fiji | Test match | Apia Park; Apia | |
| 19 | Filivaa | Not recorded | Sep 21, 1928 | Fiji | Test match | Apia Park; Apia | |
| 20 | Iese | Not recorded | Sep 21, 1928 | Fiji | Test match | Apia Park; Apia | |
| 21 | Latai | Not recorded | Sep 21, 1928 | Fiji | Test match | Apia Park; Apia | |
| 22 | Lui | Wing | Sep 21, 1928 | Fiji | Test match | Apia Park; Apia | |
| 23 | Manulua | Not recorded | Sep 21, 1928 | Fiji | Test match | Apia Park; Apia | |
| 24 | C. Meredith | Centre | Sep 21, 1928 | Fiji | Test match | Apia Park; Apia | |
| 25 | Moli | Not recorded | Sep 21, 1928 | Fiji | Test match | Apia Park; Apia | |
| 26 | Pio | Not recorded | Sep 21, 1928 | Fiji | Test match | Apia Park; Apia | |
| 27 | Poutoa | Not recorded | Sep 21, 1928 | Fiji | Test match | Apia Park; Apia | |
| 28 | Siaosi | Not recorded | Sep 21, 1928 | Fiji | Test match | Apia Park; Apia | |
| 29 | Te'o Simaile | Not recorded | Sep 21, 1928 | Fiji | Test match | Apia Park; Apia | |
| 30 | Simanu | Flanker | Sep 21, 1928 | Fiji | Test match | Apia Park; Apia | |
| 31 | Tuvale | Not recorded | Sep 21, 1928 | Fiji | Test match | Apia Park; Apia | |
| 32 | Aʻati | Hooker | Sep 16, 1932 | Tonga | Test match | Apia Park; Apia | |
| 33 | Ah Mu | Prop | Sep 16, 1932 | Tonga | Test match | Apia Park; Apia | |
| 34 | Fruean | Flanker | Sep 16, 1932 | Tonga | Test match | Apia Park; Apia | |
| 35 | Hellesoe | Prop | Sep 16, 1932 | Tonga | Test match | Apia Park; Apia | |
| 36 | Mose | No. 8 | Sep 16, 1932 | Tonga | Test match | Apia Park; Apia | |
| 37 | Panapa | Wing | Sep 16, 1932 | Tonga | Test match | Apia Park; Apia | |
| 38 | Petelo | Lock | Sep 16, 1932 | Tonga | Test match | Apia Park; Apia | |
| 39 | Sefo | Fly-half | Sep 16, 1932 | Tonga | Test match | Apia Park; Apia | |
| 40 | Tamalua | Lock | Sep 16, 1932 | Tonga | Test match | Apia Park; Apia | |
| 41 | Visesio | Fullback | Sep 16, 1932 | Tonga | Test match | Apia Park; Apia | |
| 42 | S. Ah Fook | Not recorded | Aug 9, 1947 | Tonga | Test match | Apia Park; Apia | |
| 43 | K. Ese | Not recorded | Aug 9, 1947 | Tonga | Test match | Apia Park; Apia | |
| 44 | Faʻamaile | Hooker | Aug 9, 1947 | Tonga | Test match | Apia Park; Apia | |
| 45 | F. Faʻasuaga | Fly-half | Aug 9, 1947 | Tonga | Test match | Apia Park; Apia | |
| 46 | Fatu | Prop | Aug 9, 1947 | Tonga | Test match | Apia Park; Apia | |
| 47 | S. Fretton | Centre | Aug 9, 1947 | Tonga | Test match | Apia Park; Apia | |
| 48 | S. Iuta | Wing | Aug 9, 1947 | Tonga | Test match | Apia Park; Apia | |
| 49 | M. Mataʻafa | Centre | Aug 9, 1947 | Tonga | Test match | Apia Park; Apia | |
| 50 | O. Meredith | Scrum-half | Aug 9, 1947 | Tonga | Test match | Apia Park; Apia | |
| 51 | J. Schaafhausen | Wing | Aug 9, 1947 | Tonga | Test match | Apia Park; Apia | |
| 52 | W. Schaafhausen | Lock | Aug 9, 1947 | Tonga | Test match | Apia Park; Apia | |
| 53 | A. Teo | Fullback | Aug 9, 1947 | Tonga | Test match | Apia Park; Apia | |
| 54 | T. Tuisaula | No. 8 | Aug 9, 1947 | Tonga | Test match | Apia Park; Apia | |
| 55 | T. Viliamu | Flanker | Aug 9, 1947 | Tonga | Test match | Apia Park; Apia | |
| 56 | C. Betham | Prop | Jun 4, 1955 | Fiji XV | Test match | Apia Park; Apia | |
| 57 | J. Cavanagh | No. 8 | Jun 4, 1955 | Fiji XV | Test match | Apia Park; Apia | |
| 58 | O. Crichton | Wing | Jun 4, 1955 | Fiji XV | Test match | Apia Park; Apia | |
| 59 | Silipa Fruean | Prop | Jun 4, 1955 | Fiji XV | Test match | Apia Park; Apia | |
| 60 | Tile Imo | Flanker | Jun 4, 1955 | Fiji XV | Test match | Apia Park; Apia | |
| 61 | Leavaula Kamu | Lock | Jun 4, 1955 | Fiji XV | Test match | Apia Park; Apia | |
| 62 | Potu Leavasa | Center | Jun 4, 1955 | Fiji XV | Test match | Apia Park; Apia | |
| 63 | Sosene Leavasa | Fullback | Jun 4, 1955 | Fiji XV | Test match | Apia Park; Apia | |
| 64 | O. Nelson | Wing | Jun 4, 1955 | Fiji XV | Test match | Apia Park; Apia | |
| 65 | Sione Palaʻamo | Fly-half | Jun 4, 1955 | Fiji XV | Test match | Apia Park; Apia | |
| 66 | Muka Papaliʻi | Hooker | Jun 4, 1955 | Fiji XV | Test match | Apia Park; Apia | |
| 67 | P. Paul | Lock | Jun 4, 1955 | Fiji XV | Test match | Apia Park; Apia | |
| 68 | Pelenato Solia | Center | Jun 4, 1955 | Fiji XV | Test match | Apia Park; Apia | |
| 69 | Fetu Teo | Flanker | Jun 4, 1955 | Fiji XV | Test match | Apia Park; Apia | |
| 70 | S. Wendt | Scrum-half | Jun 4, 1955 | Fiji XV | Test match | Apia Park; Apia | |
| 71 | F. Ah Long | Hooker | Jun 11, 1955 | Fiji XV | Test match | Apia Park; Apia | |
| 72 | Sioa Fale | No. 8 | Jun 11, 1955 | Fiji XV | Test match | Apia Park; Apia | |
| 73 | Mose Hewitt | Lock | Jun 11, 1955 | Fiji XV | Test match | Apia Park; Apia | |
| 74 | Kapisi Toleafoa | Prop | Jun 11, 1955 | Fiji XV | Test match | Apia Park; Apia | |
| 75 | B. Laban | Center | Jun 18, 1955 | Fiji XV | Test match | Apia Park; Apia | |
| 76 | M. Papaliʻi | Hooker | Jun 18, 1955 | Fiji XV | Test match | Apia Park; Apia | |
| 77 | L. Eves | Scrum-half | Jun 1, 1957 | Tonga | Test match | Apia Park; Apia | |
| 78 | Faʻasalele | Prop | Jun 1, 1957 | Tonga | Test match | Apia Park; Apia | |
| 79 | A. Grey | Not recorded | Jun 1, 1957 | Tonga | Test match | Apia Park; Apia | |
| 80 | J. Hunt | Not recorded | Jun 1, 1957 | Tonga | Test match | Apia Park; Apia | |
| 81 | A. Ioane | Flanker | Jun 1, 1957 | Tonga | Test match | Apia Park; Apia | |
| 82 | Mei Lome | Lock | Jun 1, 1957 | Tonga | Test match | Apia Park; Apia | |
| 83 | P. Matailina | Lock | Jun 1, 1957 | Tonga | Test match | Apia Park; Apia | |
| 84 | P. Saili | Fullback | Jun 1, 1957 | Tonga | Test match | Apia Park; Apia | |
| 85 | L. Savaiʻinaea | Not recorded | Jun 1, 1957 | Tonga | Test match | Apia Park; Apia | |
| 86 | L. Schaafhausen | Not recorded | Jun 1, 1957 | Tonga | Test match | Apia Park; Apia | |
| 87 | V. Teo | Not recorded | Jun 1, 1957 | Tonga | Test match | Apia Park; Apia | |
| 88 | M. Fepulea'i | Centre | Jun 4, 1957 | Tonga | Test match | Apia Park; Apia | |
| 89 | S. Kalapu | Not recorded | Jun 4, 1957 | Tonga | Test match | Apia Park; Apia | |
| 90 | M. McFadyen | Not recorded | Jun 4, 1957 | Tonga | Test match | Apia Park; Apia | |
| 91 | F. Nickel | Not recorded | Jun 4, 1957 | Tonga | Test match | Apia Park; Apia | |
| 92 | Nimmo | Not recorded | Jun 4, 1957 | Tonga | Test match | Apia Park; Apia | |
| 93 | Paul Swepson | Not recorded | Jun 4, 1957 | Tonga | Test match | Apia Park; Apia | |
| 94 | F. Tuatagaloa | Not recorded | Jun 4, 1957 | Tonga | Test match | Apia Park; Apia | |
| 95 | Mila Vili | Fly Half | Jun 4, 1957 | Tonga | Test match | Apia Park; Apia | |
| 96 | Faleata Asi | Flanker | Aug 30, 1963 | Fiji | 1963 South Pacific Games | National Stadium; Suva | |
| 97 | Fautai Faʻasiu | Flanker | Aug 30, 1963 | Fiji | 1963 South Pacific Games | National Stadium; Suva | |
| 98 | Salele Feagai | Prop | Aug 30, 1963 | Fiji | 1963 South Pacific Games | National Stadium; Suva | |
| 99 | Hans Kruse | Hooker | Aug 30, 1963 | Fiji | 1963 South Pacific Games | National Stadium; Suva | |
| 100 | A. Liaina | Wing | Aug 30, 1963 | Fiji | 1963 South Pacific Games | National Stadium; Suva | |
| 101 | Solomona Liaina | Lock | Aug 30, 1963 | Fiji | 1963 South Pacific Games | National Stadium; Suva | |
| 102 | Faʻaitu Mailei | Prop | Aug 30, 1963 | Fiji | 1963 South Pacific Games | National Stadium; Suva | |
| 103 | Jack Meredith | Wing | Aug 30, 1963 | Fiji | 1963 South Pacific Games | National Stadium; Suva | |
| 104 | Sio Perez | Fly-half | Aug 30, 1963 | Fiji | 1963 South Pacific Games | National Stadium; Suva | |
| 105 | L. Sagaga | Scrum-half | Aug 30, 1963 | Fiji | 1963 South Pacific Games | National Stadium; Suva | |
| 106 | Po Siu | No. 8 | Aug 30, 1963 | Fiji | 1963 South Pacific Games | National Stadium; Suva | |
| 107 | V. Stet | Lock | Aug 30, 1963 | Fiji | 1963 South Pacific Games | National Stadium; Suva | |
| 108 | I. Tualaulelei | Center | Aug 30, 1963 | Fiji | 1963 South Pacific Games | National Stadium; Suva | |
| 109 | Keli Tuatagaloa | Center | Aug 30, 1963 | Fiji | 1963 South Pacific Games | National Stadium; Suva | |
| 110 | V. Tuatagaloa | Fullback | Aug 30, 1963 | Fiji | 1963 South Pacific Games | National Stadium; Suva | |
| 111 | Efu Feagai | Not recorded | Sep 3, 1963 | Tonga | 1963 South Pacific Games | National Stadium; Suva | |
| 112 | Pito Faʻalogo | Center | Sep 5, 1963 | Fiji | 1963 South Pacific Games | National Stadium; Suva | |
| 113 | Fealofima Lima | Flanker | Sep 5, 1963 | Fiji | 1963 South Pacific Games | National Stadium; Suva | |
| 114 | Niʻo Petaia | Fullback | Sep 5, 1963 | Fiji | 1963 South Pacific Games | National Stadium; Suva | |
| 115 | H. Ekeroma | Not recorded | May 27, 1972 | Tonga | Test match | Apia Park; Apia | |
| 116 | S. Epati | Not recorded | May 27, 1972 | Tonga | Test match | Apia Park; Apia | |
| 117 | J. Fruean | Lock | May 27, 1972 | Tonga | Test match | Apia Park; Apia | |
| 118 | Siro Fuatai | Not recorded | May 27, 1972 | Tonga | Test match | Apia Park; Apia | |
| 119 | T. Galuvao | Not recorded | May 27, 1972 | Tonga | Test match | Apia Park; Apia | |
| 120 | I. Melei | Not recorded | May 27, 1972 | Tonga | Test match | Apia Park; Apia | |
| 121 | P. Momoisea | Not recorded | May 27, 1972 | Tonga | Test match | Apia Park; Apia | |
| 123 | T. Palamo | Not recorded | May 27, 1972 | Tonga | Test match | Apia Park; Apia | |
| 124 | K. Roberts | Not recorded | May 27, 1972 | Tonga | Test match | Apia Park; Apia | |
| 125 | R. Slade | Not recorded | May 27, 1972 | Tonga | Test match | Apia Park; Apia | |
| 126 | R. Tiatia | Not recorded | May 27, 1972 | Tonga | Test match | Apia Park; Apia | |
| 127 | S. Tilialo | Not recorded | May 27, 1972 | Tonga | Test match | Apia Park; Apia | |
| 128 | P. Tuʻuau | Not recorded | May 27, 1972 | Tonga | Test match | Apia Park; Apia | |
| 129 | F. Vagaia | Not recorded | May 27, 1972 | Tonga | Test match | Apia Park; Apia | |
| 130 | F. Vito | Fly-half | May 27, 1972 | Tonga | Test match | Apia Park; Apia | |
| 131 | F. Asi | Wing | Jun 13, 1975 | Tonga | Test match | Apia Park; Apia | |
| 132 | Jeffe Atoa | Centre | Jun 13, 1975 | Tonga | Test match | Apia Park; Apia | |
| 133 | S. Enari | Hooker | Jun 13, 1975 | Tonga | Test match | Apia Park; Apia | |
| 134 | Paul Grey | Wing | Jun 13, 1975 | Tonga | Test match | Apia Park; Apia | |
| 135 | T. Iona | Lock | Jun 13, 1975 | Tonga | Test match | Apia Park; Apia | |
| 136 | T. Kali | Flanker | Jun 13, 1975 | Tonga | Test match | Apia Park; Apia | |
| 137 | I. Lagaʻaia | No. 8 | Jun 13, 1975 | Tonga | Test match | Apia Park; Apia | |
| 138 | Peter Schuster | Fullback | Jun 13, 1975 | Tonga | Test match | Apia Park; Apia | |
| 139 | Asora Simanu | Lock | Jun 13, 1975 | Tonga | Test match | Apia Park; Apia | |
| 140 | Fa'apopo Siu | Hooker | Jun 13, 1975 | Tonga | Test match | Apia Park; Apia | |
| 141 | L. Utuʻutu | Wing | Jun 13, 1975 | Tonga | Test match | Apia Park; Apia | |
| 142 | M. Vili | Centre | Jun 13, 1975 | Tonga | Test match | Apia Park; Apia | |
| 143 | Susuga Alesana | Flanker | Aug 30, 1979 | Tonga | 1979 South Pacific Games | National Stadium; Suva | |
| 144 | Se Atiʻifale | Hooker | Aug 30, 1979 | Tonga | 1979 South Pacific Games | National Stadium; Suva | |
| 145 | Simaile Leaupepe | Prop | Aug 30, 1979 | Tonga | 1979 South Pacific Games | National Stadium; Suva | |
| 146 | Andy Leavasa | Lock | Aug 30, 1979 | Tonga | 1979 South Pacific Games | National Stadium; Suva | |
| 147 | Magalo Malele | Prop | Aug 30, 1979 | Tonga | 1979 South Pacific Games | National Stadium; Suva | |
| 148 | Arona Palamo | Centre | Aug 30, 1979 | Tonga | 1979 South Pacific Games | National Stadium; Suva | |
| 149 | Niko Palamo | Centre | Aug 30, 1979 | Tonga | 1979 South Pacific Games | National Stadium; Suva | |
| 150 | Tapuofaofa Patu | Fullback | Aug 30, 1979 | Tonga | 1979 South Pacific Games | National Stadium; Suva | |
| 151 | Keli Saifoloi | Lock | Aug 30, 1979 | Tonga | 1979 South Pacific Games | National Stadium; Suva | |
| 152 | Taufusi Salesa | Centre | Aug 30, 1979 | Tonga | 1979 South Pacific Games | National Stadium; Suva | |
| 153 | Ricky Schmidt | Scrum-half | Aug 30, 1979 | Tonga | 1979 South Pacific Games | National Stadium; Suva | |
| 154 | Faitala Talapusi | No. 8 | Aug 30, 1979 | Tonga | 1979 South Pacific Games | National Stadium; Suva | |
| 155 | Foua Toloa | Flanker | Aug 30, 1979 | Tonga | 1979 South Pacific Games | National Stadium; Suva | |
| 156 | A. Utuʻutu | Fullback | Aug 30, 1979 | Tonga | 1979 South Pacific Games | National Stadium; Suva | |
| 157 | Fineaso Aimaʻasu | Hooker | Sep 5, 1979 | Fiji | 1979 South Pacific Games | National Stadium; Suva | |
| 158 | Seletifuti Patu | Wing | Sep 5, 1979 | Fiji | 1979 South Pacific Games | National Stadium; Suva | |
| 159 | Mark Phillips | Lock | Sep 5, 1979 | Fiji | 1979 South Pacific Games | National Stadium; Suva | |
| 160 | Korua | (Wing) | Sep 5, 1979 | Fiji | 1979 South Pacific Games | National Stadium; Suva | |
| 161 | O. Patu | Not recorded | Jun 3, 1980 | Tonga | Test match | Apia Park; Apia | |
| 162 | P. Schmidt | Not recorded | Jun 3, 1980 | Tonga | Test match | Apia Park; Apia | |
| 163 | Feausiga Sililoto | Scrum-half | Jun 3, 1980 | Tonga | Test match | Apia Park; Apia | |
| 164 | Taei Aoese | Lock | Jun 27, 1981 | Fiji | Test match | Churchill Park; Lautoka | |
| 165 | Saipele Esera | Flanker | Jun 27, 1981 | Fiji | Test match | Churchill Park; Lautoka | |
| 166 | Falefa Lima | Fly-half | Jun 27, 1981 | Fiji | Test match | Churchill Park; Lautoka | |
| 167 | Samuela Punivalu | Prop | Jun 27, 1981 | Fiji | Test match | Churchill Park; Lautoka | |
| 168 | Tufua Seʻumanutafa | Wing | Jun 27, 1981 | Fiji | Test match | Churchill Park; Lautoka | |
| 169 | Pio Sioa | Lock | Jun 27, 1981 | Fiji | Test match | Churchill Park; Lautoka | |
| 170 | Dickie Tafua | Flanker | Jun 27, 1981 | Fiji | Test match | Churchill Park; Lautoka | |
| 171 | Ieti Solipo | Flanker | Jul 4, 1981 | Fiji | Test match | National Stadium; Suva | |
| 172 | Vaʻa Tasi | Wing | Jul 4, 1981 | Fiji | Test match | National Stadium; Suva | |
| 173 | Jack Huch | Wing | Jun 2, 1982 | Fiji | 1982 South Pacific Championship | Apia Park; Apia | |
| 174 | Maafala Lima | Flanker | Jun 2, 1982 | Fiji | 1982 South Pacific Championship | Apia Park; Apia | |
| 175 | Faʻaniniva Ropati | Fullback | Jun 2, 1982 | Fiji | 1982 South Pacific Championship | Apia Park; Apia | |
| 176 | Faʻafetai Sua | Hooker | Jun 2, 1982 | Fiji | 1982 South Pacific Championship | Apia Park; Apia | |
| 177 | Sepe Tupuola | No. 8 | Jun 2, 1982 | Fiji | 1982 South Pacific Championship | Apia Park; Apia | |
| 178 | Sanele Skelton | (Prop) | Jun 2, 1982 | Fiji | 1982 South Pacific Championship | Apia Park; Apia | |
| 179 | Filitoga Lameta | (No. 8) | Jun 12, 1982 | Fiji | Test match | Chanel College; Apia | |
| 180 | Pati Maligi | Flanker | Aug 21, 1982 | Fiji | Test match | National Stadium; Suva | |
| 181 | Lomitusi Sasi | Prop | Aug 21, 1982 | Fiji | Test match | National Stadium; Suva | |
| 182 | Kini Vaega | Center | Aug 21, 1982 | Fiji | Test match | National Stadium; Suva | |
| 183 | Toma Aleni | Scrum-half | Aug 25, 1982 | Tonga | 1982 South Pacific Championship | Teufaiva Sport Stadium; Nukuʻalofa | |
| 184 | David Schuster | Not recorded | Aug 25, 1982 | Tonga | 1982 South Pacific Championship | Teufaiva Sport Stadium; Nukuʻalofa | |
| 185 | Andrew Aiolupo | Fullback | Jun 22, 1983 | Tonga | 1983 South Pacific Championship | National Stadium; Suva | |
| 186 | Taʻi Fong | Not recorded | Jun 22, 1983 | Tonga | 1983 South Pacific Championship | National Stadium; Suva | |
| 187 | Lolani Koko | Wing | Jun 22, 1983 | Tonga | 1983 South Pacific Championship | National Stadium; Suva | |
| 188 | Marcus Krause | Hooker | Jun 25, 1983 | Fiji | 1983 South Pacific Championship | National Stadium; Suva | |
| 189 | Keith McFall | Scrum-half | Jun 25, 1983 | Fiji | 1983 South Pacific Championship | National Stadium; Suva | |
| 190 | Winston Ryan | Wing | Jun 25, 1983 | Fiji | 1983 South Pacific Championship | National Stadium; Suva | |
| 191 | Faʻauʻuga Kelemete | Lock | Jun 30, 1984 | Fiji | 1984 South Pacific Championship | National Stadium; Suva | |
| 192 | Etuale Sefo | Prop | Jun 30, 1984 | Fiji | 1984 South Pacific Championship | National Stadium; Suva | |
| 193 | T. Tavita | Scrum-half | Jun 30, 1984 | Fiji | 1984 South Pacific Championship | National Stadium; Suva | |
| 194 | S. Motoi | Not recorded | Jul 4, 1984 | Tonga | 1984 South Pacific Championship | National Stadium; Suva | |
| 195 | I. Fesuiaii | Prop | Jun 1, 1985 | Fiji | 1985 South Pacific Championship | Apia Park; Apia | |
| 196 | Iose Grey | Lock | Jun 1, 1985 | Fiji | 1985 South Pacific Championship | Apia Park; Apia | |
| 197 | Sepulona Moamanu | Hooker | Jun 1, 1985 | Fiji | 1985 South Pacific Championship | Apia Park; Apia | |
| 198 | Tovia Petelo | Center | Jun 1, 1985 | Fiji | 1985 South Pacific Championship | Apia Park; Apia | |
| 199 | John Schuster | Scrum-half | Jun 1, 1985 | Fiji | 1985 South Pacific Championship | Apia Park; Apia | |
| 200 | Iosefo Tautua | No. 8 | Jun 1, 1985 | Fiji | 1985 South Pacific Championship | Apia Park; Apia | |
| 201 | Stan Toʻomalatai | Prop | Jun 1, 1985 | Fiji | 1985 South Pacific Championship | Apia Park; Apia | |
| 202 | John Ulugia | Wing | Jun 1, 1985 | Fiji | 1985 South Pacific Championship | Apia Park; Apia | |
| 203 | M. Lautau | (Substitute) | Jun 1, 1985 | Fiji | 1985 South Pacific Championship | Apia Park; Apia | |
| 204 | J. Apelu | Not recorded | Jun 8, 1985 | Tonga | 1985 South Pacific Championship | Apia Park; Apia | |
| 205 | K. Mavaega | Not recorded | Jun 8, 1985 | Tonga | 1985 South Pacific Championship | Apia Park; Apia | |
| 206 | F. Solomona | Not recorded | Jun 22, 1985 | Tonga | Test match | Apia Park; Apia | |
| 207 | Palemia Alalafoa | Lock | Jul 2, 1986 | Fiji | 1986 South Pacific Championship | Teufaiva Sport Stadium; Nukuʻalofa | |
| 208 | Alani Fata | Flanker | Jul 2, 1986 | Fiji | 1986 South Pacific Championship | Teufaiva Sport Stadium; Nukuʻalofa | |
| 209 | Faalelei Feimanatufa | Flanker | Jul 2, 1986 | Fiji | 1986 South Pacific Championship | Teufaiva Sport Stadium; Nukuʻalofa | |
| 210 | Keneti Taylor | Wing | Jul 2, 1986 | Fiji | 1986 South Pacific Championship | Teufaiva Sport Stadium; Nukuʻalofa | |
| 211 | John Ah Kuoi | Center | Aug 22, 1987 | Fiji | 1987 South Pacific Championship | National Stadium; Suva | |
| 212 | Vaivase Faʻasua | Flanker | Aug 22, 1987 | Fiji | 1987 South Pacific Championship | National Stadium; Suva | |
| 213 | Ekeroma Luaiufi | Lock | Aug 22, 1987 | Fiji | 1987 South Pacific Championship | National Stadium; Suva | |
| 214 | Afa Leuʻu | Prop | Aug 22, 1987 | Fiji | 1987 South Pacific Championship | National Stadium; Suva | |
| 215 | Petaia Nee Nee | Fullback | Aug 22, 1987 | Fiji | 1987 South Pacific Championship | National Stadium; Suva | |
| 216 | Kitona Vai | Flanker | Aug 22, 1987 | Fiji | 1987 South Pacific Championship | National Stadium; Suva | |
| 217 | Tiny Jensen | Centre | Aug 28, 1987 | Tonga | 1987 South Pacific Championship | National Stadium; Suva | |
| 218 | Tuise Sefo | Lock | Aug 28, 1987 | Tonga | 1987 South Pacific Championship | National Stadium; Suva | |
| 219 | S. Tanuko | Flanker | Aug 28, 1987 | Tonga | 1987 South Pacific Championship | National Stadium; Suva | |
| 220 | Peleiepu Fuatai Tafua | Lock | May 28, 1988 | Tonga | 1988 South Pacific Championship | Apia Park; Apia | |
| 221 | Malaki Iupeli | Wing | May 28, 1988 | Tonga | 1988 South Pacific Championship | Apia Park; Apia | |
| 222 | T. Magele | Not registered | May 28, 1988 | Tonga | 1988 South Pacific Championship | Apia Park; Apia | |
| 223 | Filipo Saena | Fly-half | May 28, 1988 | Tonga | 1988 South Pacific Championship | Apia Park; Apia | |
| 224 | Keneti Sio | Centre | May 28, 1988 | Tonga | 1988 South Pacific Championship | Apia Park; Apia | |
| 225 | Suliveta Uati | Scrum-half | May 28, 1988 | Tonga | 1988 South Pacific Championship | Apia Park; Apia | |
| 226 | Tauveve Ugapo | Wing | May 28, 1988 | Tonga | 1988 South Pacific Championship | Apia Park; Apia | |
| 227 | Lafaele Mano | Flanker | June 4, 1988 | Fiji | 1988 South Pacific Championship | Apia Park; Apia | |
| 228 | Taumaloto Tofilau | Number 8 | June 4, 1988 | Fiji | 1988 South Pacific Championship | Apia Park; Apia | |
| 229 | Vili Alaalatoa | Prop | October 29, 1988 | Ireland | 1988 Britain and Ireland tour | Lansdowne Road, Dublin | |
| 230 | Peter Fatialofa | Prop | October 29, 1988 | Ireland | 1988 Britain and Ireland tour | Lansdowne Road, Dublin | |
| 231 | Saini Lemamea | Lock | October 29, 1988 | Ireland | 1988 Britain and Ireland tour | Lansdowne Road, Dublin | |
| 232 | Daryl Williams | Lock | October 29, 1988 | Ireland | 1988 Britain and Ireland tour | Lansdowne Road, Dublin | |
| 233 | Phineas Young | Scrum-half | October 29, 1988 | Ireland | 1988 Britain and Ireland tour | Lansdowne Road, Dublin | |
| 234 | Ollie Crichton | Flanker (substitute) | October 29, 1988 | Ireland | 1988 Britain and Ireland tour | Lansdowne Road, Dublin | |
| 235 | Tupo Fa'amasino | Centre | November 12, 1988 | Wales | 1988 Britain and Ireland tour | National Stadium, Cardiff | |
| 236 | Vincent Fepulea'i | Scrum-half | November 12, 1988 | Wales | 1988 Britain and Ireland tour | National Stadium, Cardiff | |
| 237 | P. Schmidt | not recorded | June 10, 1988 | Fiji | 1988 South Pacific Championship | Apia Park, Apia | |
| 238 | Harry Schuster | Number 8 | June 10, 1988 | Fiji | 1988 South Pacific Championship | Apia Park, Apia | |
| 239 | T. Tofaeono | not recorded | June 10, 1988 | Fiji | 1988 South Pacific Championship | Apia Park, Apia | |
| 240 | Fa'atoto Moanamu | not recorded | September 30, 1989 | West Germany | 1989 Western Samoa rugby union tour of Europe | Sportpark Höhenberg, Bonn | |
| 241 | P. Paulo | flanker | October 3, 1989 | Belgium | 1989 Western Samoa rugby union tour of Europe | Stade Fallon, Brussels | |
| 242 | S.Sauila | not recorded | October 3, 1989 | Belgium | 1989 Western Samoa rugby union tour of Europe | Stade Fallon, Brussels | |
| 243 | F. Talamaivao | not recorded | October 3, 1989 | Belgium | 1989 Western Samoa rugby union tour of Europe | Stade Fallon, Brussels | |
| 244 | S. Telea | not recorded | October 3, 1989 | Belgium | 1989 Western Samoa rugby union tour of Europe | Stade Fallon, Brussels | |
| 245 | Sila Vaifale | flanker | October 14, 1989 | Romania | 1989 Western Samoa rugby union tour of Europe | Stadionul Dinamo, Bucharest | |
| 246 | Sam Po Ching | lock | April 8, 1990 | South Korea | 1991 Rugby World Cup Asia and Oceania qualifier | Chichibunomiya Rugby Stadium, Tokyo | |
| 247 | Danny Kaleopa | flanker | April 8, 1990 | South Korea | 1991 Rugby World Cup Asia and Oceania qualifier | Chichibunomiya Rugby Stadium, Tokyo | |
| 248 | Milovale Moke | scrum-half | April 8, 1990 | South Korea | 1991 Rugby World Cup Asia and Oceania qualifier | Chichibunomiya Rugby Stadium, Tokyo | |
| 249 | Timo Tagaloa | wing | April 8, 1990 | South Korea | 1991 Rugby World Cup Asia and Oceania qualifier | Chichibunomiya Rugby Stadium, Tokyo | |
| 250 | David Sio | prop | April 11, 1990 | Tonga | 1991 Rugby World Cup Asia and Oceania qualifier | Chichibunomiya Rugby Stadium, Tokyo | |
| 251 | Peter Leavai | lock | April 15, 1990 | Japan | 1991 Rugby World Cup Asia and Oceania qualifier | Chichibunomiya Rugby Stadium, Tokyo | |
| 252 | S. Fa'aofo | not recorded | June 17, 1990 | Tonga | 1990 South Pacific Championship | Apia Park, Apia | |
| 253 | Lio Falaniko | lock | June 17, 1990 | Tonga | 1990 South Pacific Championship | Apia Park, Apia | |
| 254 | Siu Fanolua | prop | June 17, 1990 | Tonga | 1990 South Pacific Championship | Apia Park, Apia | |
| 255 | Eddie Ioane | lock | June 17, 1990 | Tonga | 1990 South Pacific Championship | Apia Park, Apia | |
| 256 | Filitoga Lameta | number 8 | June 17, 1990 | Tonga | 1990 South Pacific Championship | Apia Park, Apia | |
| 257 | Shem Tatupu | flanker | June 17, 1990 | Tonga | 1990 South Pacific Championship | Apia Park, Apia | |
| 258 | Stephen Bachop | fly-half | May 28, 1991 | Tonga | 1991 South Pacific Championship | Teufaiva Sports Stadium, Nuku'alofa | |
| 264 | Brian Lima | wing | May 28, 1991 | Tonga | 1991 South Pacific Championship | Teufaiva Sports Stadium, Nuku'alofa | |
| 265 | Junior Paramore | flanker | May 28, 1991 | Tonga | 1991 South Pacific Championship | Teufaiva Sports Stadium, Nuku'alofa | |
| 266 | Apollo Perelini | flanker | May 28, 1991 | Tonga | 1991 South Pacific Championship | Teufaiva Sports Stadium, Nuku'alofa | |
| 267 | Mathew Vaea | scrum-half | May 28, 1991 | Tonga | 1991 South Pacific Championship | Teufaiva Sports Stadium, Nuku'alofa | |
| 268 | Mark Birtwistle | lock | October 6, 1991 | Wales | 1991 Rugby World Cup | National Stadium, Cardiff | |
| 269 | Frank Bunce | centre | October 6, 1991 | Wales | 1991 Rugby World Cup | National Stadium, Cardiff | |
| 270 | Mata'afa Keenan | lock | October 6, 1991 | Wales | 1991 Rugby World Cup | National Stadium, Cardiff | |
| 271 | Pat Lam | number 8 | October 6, 1991 | Wales | 1991 Rugby World Cup | National Stadium, Cardiff | |
| 272 | Alama Ieremia | centre | June 13, 1992 | Tonga | 1992 South Pacific Championship | Apia Park, Apia | |
| 273 | Kose Seinafo | scrum-half | June 13, 1992 | Tonga | 1992 South Pacific Championship | Apia Park, Apia | |
| 274 | Freddie Tuilagi | wing | June 13, 1992 | Tonga | 1992 South Pacific Championship | Apia Park, Apia | |
| 275 | Ofisa Tonu'u | scrum-half | June 20, 1992 | Fiji | 1992 South Pacific Championship | National Stadium, Suva | |
| 276 | Darren Kellett | Fly-half | May 29, 1993 | Tonga | | Nukuʻalofa | |
| 277 | Potu Leavasa | Lock | May 29, 1993 | Tonga | | Nukuʻalofa | |
| 278 | Tala Leiasamaivao | Hooker | May 29, 1993 | Tonga | | Nukuʻalofa | |
| 279 | Palemia Lilomaiava | (Prop) | Jul 31, 1993 | New Zealand | | Auckland | |
| 280 | George Latu | Prop | Jun 4, 1994 | Tonga | | Apia | |
| 281 | Tu Nu'uali'itia | Scrum-half | Jun 4, 1994 | Tonga | | Apia | |
| 282 | Sam Kaleta | (Flanker) | Jun 4, 1994 | Tonga | | Apia | |
| 283 | Rudy Moors | (Scrum-half) | Jun 4, 1994 | Tonga | | Apia | |
| 284 | Toa Samania | Wing | Jun 25, 1994 | Wales | | Apia | |
| 285 | Va'apu'u Vitale | Scrum-half | Jun 25, 1994 | Wales | | Apia | |
| 286 | Dylan Mika | (Back-row) | Jun 25, 1994 | Wales | | Apia | |
| 287 | George Harder | Wing | Apr 13, 1995 | South Africa | | Johannesburg | |
| 288 | George Leaupepe | Centre | Apr 13, 1995 | South Africa | | Johannesburg | |
| 289 | Mike Mika | Prop | Apr 13, 1995 | South Africa | | Johannesburg | |
| 290 | Esera Puleitu | Fly-half | Apr 13, 1995 | South Africa | | Johannesburg | |
| 291 | Mike Umaga | Fullback | Apr 13, 1995 | South Africa | | Johannesburg | |
| 292 | Fata Sini | (Fly-half) | Apr 13, 1995 | South Africa | | Johannesburg | |
| 293 | Brendan Reidy | (Prop) | Jun 10, 1995 | South Africa | | Johannesburg | |
| 294 | Joe Filemu | Scrum-half | Nov 18, 1995 | Scotland | | Murrayfield Stadium | |
| 295 | Veli Patu | Fullback | Nov 18, 1995 | Scotland | | Murrayfield Stadium | |
| 296 | Alex Telea | Wing | Nov 18, 1995 | Scotland | | Murrayfield Stadium | |
| 297 | Stephen Smith | (Lock) | Nov 18, 1995 | Scotland | | Murrayfield Stadium | |
| 298 | Terry Fanolua | (Centre) | Jun 7, 1996 | New Zealand | | Napier | |
| 299 | Sene Ta'ala | Lock | Jul 13, 1996 | Tonga | | Apia | |
| 300 | Fa'avaivai Tanoa'i | Fly-half | Jul 13, 1996 | Tonga | | Apia | |
| 301 | Onehunga Matauiau | (Hooker) | Jul 13, 1996 | Tonga | | Apia | |
| 302 | Kaisa Tuigamala | (Wing) | Jul 20, 1996 | Fiji | | Suva | |
| 303 | Isaac Fe'aunati | No. 8 | Nov 12, 1996 | Ireland | | Lansdowne Road | |
| 304 | Afato So'oalo | Wing | Nov 12, 1996 | Ireland | | Lansdowne Road | |
| 305 | Inga Tuigamala | Wing | Nov 12, 1996 | Ireland | | Lansdowne Road | |
| 306 | Earl Va'a | Fly-half | Nov 12, 1996 | Ireland | | Lansdowne Road | |
| 307 | Robbie Ale | Centre | Jun 28, 1997 | Tonga | | Apia | |
| 308 | John Clarke | Fly-half | Jun 28, 1997 | Tonga | | Apia | |
| 309 | Silao Leaegailesolo | Not recorded | Jun 28, 1997 | Tonga | | Apia | |
| 310 | Trevor Leota | Not recorded | Jun 28, 1997 | Tonga | | Apia | |
| 311 | Tupae Pati | Not recorded | Jun 28, 1997 | Tonga | | Apia | |
| 312 | Richard Rasmussen | Not recorded | Jun 28, 1997 | Tonga | | Apia | |
| 313 | Kepi Faiva'ai | Prop | Sep 18, 1998 | Tonga | | Sydney | |
| 314 | Fosi Pala'amo | Prop | Sep 18, 1998 | Tonga | | Sydney | |
| 315 | Opeta Palepoi | Lock | Sep 18, 1998 | Tonga | | Sydney | |
| 316 | Steve So'oialo | Scrum-half | Sep 18, 1998 | Tonga | | Sydney | |
| 317 | Kalolo Toleafoa | Flanker | Sep 18, 1998 | Tonga | | Sydney | |
| 318 | Lama Tone | Lock | Sep 18, 1998 | Tonga | | Sydney | |
| 319 | Filipo Toala | Wing | Sep 22, 1998 | Fiji | | Canberra | |
| 320 | Malua Tipi | (Lock) | Sep 22, 1998 | Fiji | | Canberra | |
| 321 | Andrew Va'a | (Hooker) | Sep 26, 1998 | Australia | | Brisbane | |
| 322 | Craig Glendinning | No. 8 | May 22, 1999 | Japan | | Osaka | |
| 323 | Ali Koko | Wing | May 22, 1999 | Japan | | Osaka | |
| 324 | Mepi Faoagali | (Wing) | May 22, 1999 | Japan | | Osaka | |
| 325 | Mark Luafalealo | (Prop) | May 22, 1999 | Japan | | Osaka | |
| 326 | Semo Sititi | (Flanker) | May 22, 1999 | Japan | | Osaka | |
| 327 | Tanner Vili | Fullback | May 29, 1999 | Canada | | Vancouver | |
| 328 | Fa'apulou So'olefai | (Flanker) | May 29, 1999 | Canada | | Vancouver | |
| 329 | John Schuster | Centre | Jun 5, 1999 | Tonga | | Apia | |
| 330 | Tani Fuga | (Hooker) | Jun 12, 1999 | France | | Apia | |
| 331 | Polo Asi | Prop | Oct 20, 1999 | Scotland | | Murrayfield Stadium | |
| 332 | Tom Curtis | Lock | Jun 3, 2000 | Fiji | | Apia | |
| 333 | Lome Fa'atau | Wing | Jun 3, 2000 | Fiji | | Apia | |
| 334 | Kas Lealamanua | Prop | Jun 3, 2000 | Fiji | | Apia | |
| 335 | Elvis Seveali'i | Wing | Jun 3, 2000 | Fiji | | Apia | |
| 336 | Malaga Leota | (Prop) | Jun 3, 2000 | Fiji | | Apia | |
| 337 | Denning Tyrell | (Substitute) | Jun 3, 2000 | Fiji | | Apia | |
| 338 | Tim Cowley | (Flanker) | Jun 10, 2000 | Japan | | Apia | |
| 339 | Ngapaku Ngapaku | (Fly-half) | Jun 10, 2000 | Japan | | Apia | |
| 340 | Iva Motusaga | (Flanker) | Jun 24, 2000 | Tonga | | Nukuʻalofa | |
| 341 | S. Fa'asua Taua | Wing | Nov 11, 2000 | Wales | | Millennium Stadium | |
| 342 | Junior Maligi | No. 8 | Nov 11, 2000 | Wales | | Millennium Stadium | |
| 343 | Luke Mealamu | Flanker | Nov 11, 2000 | Wales | | Millennium Stadium | |
| 344 | Sika Poching | Lock | Nov 11, 2000 | Wales | | Millennium Stadium | |
| 345 | Quintan Sanft | Fly-half | Nov 11, 2000 | Wales | | Millennium Stadium | |
| 346 | Alfie Vaeluaga | Flanker | Nov 11, 2000 | Wales | | Millennium Stadium | |
| 347 | Tuaifuaina Veiru | Prop | Nov 11, 2000 | Wales | | Millennium Stadium | |
| 348 | Joe Mamea | (No. 8) | Nov 11, 2000 | Wales | | Millennium Stadium | |
| 349 | Pule Misa | (Prop) | Nov 11, 2000 | Wales | | Millennium Stadium | |
| 350 | Mahonri Schwalger | (Hooker) | Nov 11, 2000 | Wales | | Millennium Stadium | |
| 351 | Dan Tafeamalii | (Prop) | Nov 11, 2000 | Wales | | Millennium Stadium | |
| 352 | Aleki Toleafoa | (Hooker) | Nov 11, 2000 | Wales | | Millennium Stadium | |
| 353 | Fano Tone | (Lock) | Nov 11, 2000 | Wales | | Millennium Stadium | |
| 354 | Mussolini Schuster | Wing | Nov 18, 2000 | Scotland | | Murrayfield Stadium | |
| 355 | Anthony Mika | (Flanker) | Nov 18, 2000 | Scotland | | Murrayfield Stadium | |
| 356 | Leo Lafaiali'i | Lock | Jun 2, 2001 | Tonga | | Apia | |
| 357 | Patrick Segi | (Flanker) | Jun 2, 2001 | Tonga | | Apia | |
| 358 | Ace Tiatia | (Hooker) | Jun 2, 2001 | Tonga | | Apia | |
| 359 | Hery Williams | (Prop) | Jun 2, 2001 | Tonga | | Apia | |
| 360 | Tamato Leupolu | Prop | Nov 11, 2001 | Ireland | | Lansdowne Road | |
| 361 | Jonathan Meredith | Hooker | Nov 11, 2001 | Ireland | | Lansdowne Road | |
| 362 | George Stowers | No. 8 | Nov 11, 2001 | Ireland | | Lansdowne Road | |
| 363 | Jeremy Tomuli | Prop | Nov 11, 2001 | Ireland | | Lansdowne Road | |
| 364 | Siaosi Vaili | Flanker | Nov 11, 2001 | Ireland | | Lansdowne Road | |
| 365 | Kitiona Viliamu | Lock | Nov 11, 2001 | Ireland | | Lansdowne Road | |
| 366 | Fa'amaoni Lalomilo | (Prop) | Nov 11, 2001 | Ireland | | Lansdowne Road | |
| 367 | Carl Manu | (Centre) | Jun 1, 2002 | Fiji | | Apia | |
| 368 | Henry Tuilagi | (No. 8) | Jun 1, 2002 | Fiji | | Apia | |
| 369 | Alesana Tuilagi | Wing | Jun 22, 2002 | Fiji | | Nadi | |
| 370 | Maurie Fa'asavalu | Flanker | Jul 6, 2002 | South Africa | | Pretoria | |
| 371 | Ponali Tapelu | (Flanker) | Jul 6, 2002 | South Africa | | Pretoria | |
| 372 | Ron Fanuatanu | Wing | Jun 20, 2003 | Ireland | | Apia | |
| 373 | Fa'atonu Fili | Fullback | Jun 20, 2003 | Ireland | | Apia | |
| 374 | Dale Rasmussen | Centre | Jun 20, 2003 | Ireland | | Apia | |
| 375 | Gaolo Elisara | (Centre) | Jun 20, 2003 | Ireland | | Apia | |
| 376 | Des Tuiavi'i | (Flanker) | Jun 20, 2003 | Ireland | | Apia | |
| 377 | Dominic Fe'aunati | Wing | Jul 12, 2003 | Namibia | | Windhoek | |
| 378 | Sailosi Tagicakibau | Wing | Jul 12, 2003 | Namibia | | Windhoek | |
| 379 | Pama Petia | (No. 8) | Jul 12, 2003 | Namibia | | Windhoek | |
| 380 | Peter Poulos | Flanker | Oct 15, 2003 | Uruguay | | Perth | |
| 381 | Simon Lemalu | (Prop) | Oct 15, 2003 | Uruguay | | Perth | |
| 382 | Romi Ropati | Centre | Nov 1, 2003 | South Africa | | Brisbane | |
| 383 | David Lemi | Wing | May 29, 2004 | Tonga | | Apia | |
| 384 | Ulia Ulia | Flanker | May 29, 2004 | Tonga | | Apia | |
| 385 | Roger Warren | Fly-half | May 29, 2004 | Tonga | | Apia | |
| 386 | Nathan George | (Lock) | May 29, 2004 | Tonga | | Apia | |
| 387 | John Senio | (Scrum-half) | May 29, 2004 | Tonga | | Apia | |
| 388 | Loleni Tafunai | (Hooker) | May 29, 2004 | Tonga | | Apia | |
| 389 | Michael von Dincklage | (Lock) | Jun 4, 2004 | Scotland | | Wellington | |
| 390 | Ray Tuivaiti | Flanker | Jun 12, 2004 | Fiji | | Suva | |
| 391 | Lolo Lui | (Fullback) | Jun 12, 2004 | Fiji | | Suva | |
| 392 | Simaika Mikaele | (Flanker) | Jun 12, 2004 | Fiji | | Suva | |
| 393 | Census Johnston | Prop | Jun 11, 2005 | Australia | | Sydney | |
| 394 | Apoua Stewart | Fullback | Jun 11, 2005 | Australia | | Sydney | |
| 395 | Justin Va'a | Prop | Jun 11, 2005 | Australia | | Sydney | |
| 396 | Lualua Vailoaloa | Scrum-half | Jun 11, 2005 | Australia | | Sydney | |
| 397 | Dan Leo | (Back-row) | Jun 11, 2005 | Australia | | Sydney | |
| 398 | Jamie Parkinson | (Prop) | Jun 11, 2005 | Australia | | Sydney | |
| 399 | Faletoese Talapusi | (Centre) | Jun 11, 2005 | Australia | | Sydney | |
| 400 | Notise Tauafao | (Scrum-half) | Jun 11, 2005 | Australia | | Sydney | |
| 401 | Paul Tupai | (No. 8) | Jun 11, 2005 | Australia | | Sydney | |
| 402 | Filisoa Fa'aiu | No. 8 | Jul 2, 2005 | Tonga | | Apia | |
| 403 | Donald Kerslake | Prop | Jul 2, 2005 | Tonga | | Apia | |
| 404 | Muliufi Salanoa | Prop | Jul 2, 2005 | Tonga | | Apia | |
| 405 | Iosefa Taina | Flanker | Jul 2, 2005 | Tonga | | Apia | |
| 406 | Andy Tuilagi | Centre | Jul 2, 2005 | Tonga | | Apia | |
| 407 | Daniel Farani | (Back-row) | Jul 2, 2005 | Tonga | | Apia | |
| 408 | Pelu Taele | (Lock) | Jul 2, 2005 | Tonga | | Apia | |
| 409 | Garrick Cowley | Scrum-half | Nov 20, 2005 | Scotland | | Murrayfield Stadium | |
| 410 | Jonny Fa'amatuainu | Lock | Nov 20, 2005 | Scotland | | Murrayfield Stadium | |
| 411 | Eliota Fuimaono-Sapolu | Centre | Nov 20, 2005 | Scotland | | Murrayfield Stadium | |
| 412 | Aukuso Collins | (Centre) | Nov 20, 2005 | Scotland | | Murrayfield Stadium | |
| 413 | Kiri Mariner | (Centre) | Dec 3, 2005 | Argentina | | Buenos Aires | |
| 414 | Timoteo Iosua | Fullback | Jun 17, 2006 | Japan | | New Plymouth | |
| 415 | Seilala Mapusua | Centre | Jun 17, 2006 | Japan | | New Plymouth | |
| 416 | Philemon Toleafoa | Prop | Jun 17, 2006 | Japan | | New Plymouth | |
| 417 | Alafoti Fa'osiliva | (Back-row) | Jun 17, 2006 | Japan | | New Plymouth | |
| 418 | Doug Sanft | (Centre) | Jun 17, 2006 | Japan | | New Plymouth | |
| 419 | Chad Slade | (Lock) | Jun 17, 2006 | Japan | | New Plymouth | |
| 420 | Loki Crichton | Fly-half | Jun 24, 2006 | Fiji | | Suva | |
| 421 | Alapasa Cortz | Flanker | May 19, 2007 | Fiji | | Apia | |
| 422 | Filipo Levi | Lock | May 19, 2007 | Fiji | | Apia | |
| 423 | Justin Purdie | Flanker | May 19, 2007 | Fiji | | Apia | |
| 424 | Kane Thompson | Lock | May 19, 2007 | Fiji | | Apia | |
| 425 | Gavin Williams | Fullback | May 19, 2007 | Fiji | | Apia | |
| 426 | Tauvaga Fa'afou | (Wing) | May 19, 2007 | Fiji | | Apia | |
| 427 | Na'ama Leleimalefaga | (Prop) | May 19, 2007 | Fiji | | Apia | |
| 428 | Junior Poluleuligaga | (Scrum-half) | Jun 9, 2007 | South Africa | | Johannesburg | |
| 429 | Joe Tekori | (Lock) | Jun 9, 2007 | South Africa | | Johannesburg | |
| 430 | Jerry Meafou | (Centre) | Jun 23, 2007 | Tonga | | Apia | |
| 431 | Silao Vaisola-Sefo | (Hooker) | Sep 26, 2007 | United States | | Saint-Etienne | |
| 432 | Henry Fa'afili | Wing | Jun 7, 2008 | Fiji | | Lautoka | |
| 433 | Esera Lauina | Fullback | Jun 7, 2008 | Fiji | | Lautoka | |
| 434 | Samisoni Moala | Centre | Jun 7, 2008 | Fiji | | Lautoka | |
| 435 | Ray Stowers | Flanker | Jun 7, 2008 | Fiji | | Lautoka | |
| 436 | Evile Telea | Prop | Jun 7, 2008 | Fiji | | Lautoka | |
| 437 | Paletuatoa Toelupe | Centre | Jun 7, 2008 | Fiji | | Lautoka | |
| 438 | Gasolo Salima | (Wing) | Jun 7, 2008 | Fiji | | Lautoka | |
| 439 | Bell Sasalu | (Lock) | Jun 7, 2008 | Fiji | | Lautoka | |
| 440 | Hiro Tea | (Prop) | Jun 7, 2008 | Fiji | | Lautoka | |
| 441 | James Johnston | Prop | Jun 28, 2008 | Tonga | | Nukuʻalofa | |
| 442 | Uale Mai | Scrum-half | Jun 28, 2008 | Tonga | | Nukuʻalofa | |
| 443 | Egelani Fale | (Prop) | Jun 28, 2008 | Tonga | | Nukuʻalofa | |
| 444 | Ati Olive | (Flanker) | Jun 28, 2008 | Tonga | | Nukuʻalofa | |
| 445 | Rupeni Levasa | Wing | Sep 3, 2008 | New Zealand | | New Plymouth | |
| 446 | Alatasi Tupou | Fullback | Sep 3, 2008 | New Zealand | | New Plymouth | |
| 447 | Lafoga Aoelua | (Hooker) | Sep 3, 2008 | New Zealand | | New Plymouth | |
| 448 | Maselino Paulino | (Flanker) | Sep 3, 2008 | New Zealand | | New Plymouth | |
| 449 | Roysiu Tolufale | (Prop) | Sep 3, 2008 | New Zealand | | New Plymouth | |
| 450 | Will Brame | Flanker | Jun 18, 2009 | Japan | | Sigatoka | |
| 451 | Ernest Skelton | (Prop) | Jun 18, 2009 | Japan | | Sigatoka | |
| 452 | Ofisa Treviranus | (Flanker) | Jun 18, 2009 | Japan | | Sigatoka | |
| 453 | Andrew Williams | (Hooker) | Jun 18, 2009 | Japan | | Sigatoka | |
| 454 | Ki Anufe | Fly-half | Jun 23, 2009 | Tonga | | Lautoka | |
| 455 | Misioka Timoteo | Flanker | Jun 23, 2009 | Tonga | | Lautoka | |
| 456 | Titi Junior Esau | Fullback | Jul 11, 2009 | Papua New Guinea | | Apia | |
| 457 | Mikaele Pesamino | (Wing) | Jul 11, 2009 | Papua New Guinea | | Apia | |
| 458 | Afa Aiono | Flanker | Jul 18, 2009 | Papua New Guinea | | Port Moresby | |
| 459 | Nifo Nifo | Lock | Jul 18, 2009 | Papua New Guinea | | Port Moresby | |
| 460 | Pesamino Alauni | (Wing) | Jul 18, 2009 | Papua New Guinea | | Port Moresby | |
| 461 | Meki Magele | (Wing) | Jul 18, 2009 | Papua New Guinea | | Port Moresby | |
| 462 | Logovi'i Mulipola | (Prop) | Jul 18, 2009 | Papua New Guinea | | Port Moresby | |
| 463 | Sakaria Taulafo | (Prop) | Nov 13, 2009 | Wales | | Millennium Stadium | |
| 464 | Lucky Mulipola | Wing | Nov 21, 2009 | France | | Stade de France | |
| 465 | Jeremiah Fatialofa | (Prop) | Nov 21, 2009 | France | | Stade de France | |
| 466 | Semiperive Semeane | (Flanker) | Nov 28, 2009 | Italy | | Ascoli Piceno | |
| 467 | Jamie Helleur | Centre | Jun 12, 2010 | Tonga | | Apia | |
| 468 | Anthony Perenise | Prop | Jun 12, 2010 | Tonga | | Apia | |
| 469 | George Pisi | Centre | Jun 12, 2010 | Tonga | | Apia | |
| 470 | Fa'alemiga Selesele | Flanker | Jun 12, 2010 | Tonga | | Apia | |
| 471 | Paul Williams | Fullback | Jun 12, 2010 | Tonga | | Apia | |
| 472 | James Afoa | (Prop) | Jun 12, 2010 | Tonga | | Apia | |
| 473 | Fautua Otto | (Centre) | Jun 12, 2010 | Tonga | | Apia | |
| 474 | Manaia Salavea | (Lock) | Jun 12, 2010 | Tonga | | Apia | |
| 475 | Uarotafou Setu | (Wing) | Jun 12, 2010 | Tonga | | Apia | |
| 476 | Josh Keil | (Centre) | Jun 19, 2010 | Japan | | Apia | |
| 477 | Kahn Fotuali'i | Scrum-half | Oct 30, 2010 | Japan | | Tokyo | |
| 478 | Richard Muagututia | No. 8 | Oct 30, 2010 | Japan | | Tokyo | |
| 479 | Sinoti Sinoti | Wing | Oct 30, 2010 | Japan | | Tokyo | |
| 480 | Josh Tatupu | Centre | Oct 30, 2010 | Japan | | Tokyo | |
| 481 | Levi Asifa'amatala | (Lock) | Oct 30, 2010 | Japan | | Tokyo | |
| 482 | Tala Fagasoaia | (Fly-half) | Oct 30, 2010 | Japan | | Tokyo | |
| 483 | Tasesa Lavea | Fly-half | Nov 13, 2010 | Ireland | | Lansdowne Road | |
| 484 | Tiʻi Paulo | (Hooker) | Nov 20, 2010 | England | | Twickenham Stadium | |
| 485 | Tusi Pisi | Fly-half | Jul 2, 2011 | Japan | | Tokyo | |
| 486 | James So'oialo | Fullback | Jul 2, 2011 | Japan | | Tokyo | |
| 487 | Ezra Taylor | Flanker | Jul 2, 2011 | Japan | | Tokyo | |
| 488 | Taiasina Tuifu'a | No. 8 | Jul 2, 2011 | Japan | | Tokyo | |
| 489 | Ole Avei | (Hooker) | Jul 2, 2011 | Japan | | Tokyo | |
| 490 | Johnny Leota | Centre | Jul 9, 2011 | Fiji | | Suva | |
| 491 | Brenton Helleur | Scrum-half | Jul 13, 2011 | Tonga | | Lautoka | |
| 492 | Ray Ofisa | Flanker | Jul 13, 2011 | Tonga | | Lautoka | |
| 493 | Herman Porter | Centre | Jul 13, 2011 | Tonga | | Lautoka | |
| 494 | Jeremy Su'a | (Fly-half) | Sep 18, 2011 | Wales | | Hamilton | |
| 495 | Fa'atoina Autagavaia | Fullback | Jun 5, 2012 | Tonga | | Nagoya | |
| 496 | Daniel Crichton | Flanker | Jun 5, 2012 | Tonga | | Nagoya | |
| 497 | Steve Fualau | Hooker | Jun 5, 2012 | Tonga | | Nagoya | |
| 498 | Fa'atiga Lemalu | Lock | Jun 5, 2012 | Tonga | | Nagoya | |
| 499 | Ben Masoe | No. 8 | Jun 5, 2012 | Tonga | | Nagoya | |
| 500 | Ken Pisi | Wing | Jun 5, 2012 | Tonga | | Nagoya | |
| 501 | Alvin Tavana | Centre | Jun 5, 2012 | Tonga | | Nagoya | |
| 502 | Nalu Tuigamala | Scrum-half | Jun 5, 2012 | Tonga | | Nagoya | |
| 503 | Viliamu Afatia | (Prop) | Jun 5, 2012 | Tonga | | Nagoya | |
| 504 | Paul Perez | (Wing) | Jun 5, 2012 | Tonga | | Nagoya | |
| 505 | Tivaini Fomai | Flanker | Nov 9, 2012 | Canada | | Colwyn Bay | |
| 506 | Robert Lilomaiava | Wing | Nov 9, 2012 | Canada | | Colwyn Bay | |
| 507 | Filo Paulo | Lock | Nov 9, 2012 | Canada | | Colwyn Bay | |
| 508 | Setaimata Sa | Centre | Nov 9, 2012 | Canada | | Colwyn Bay | |
| 509 | Ropeti Lafo | (Substitute) | Nov 9, 2012 | Canada | | Colwyn Bay | |
| 510 | Jack Lam | Flanker | Jun 8, 2013 | Scotland | | Durban | |
| 511 | Alapati Leiua | Wing | Jun 8, 2013 | Scotland | | Durban | |
| 512 | Manu Leiataua | (Hooker) | Jun 8, 2013 | Scotland | | Durban | |
| 513 | Brando Va'aulu | (Wing) | Jun 8, 2013 | Scotland | | Durban | |
| 514 | Piula Faʻasalele | (Flanker) | Jun 15, 2013 | Italy | | Nelspruit | |
| 515 | Faifili Levave | (No. 8) | Nov 9, 2013 | Ireland | | Lansdowne Road | |
| 516 | Isaia Tuifua | (Centre) | Nov 9, 2013 | Ireland | | Lansdowne Road | |
| 517 | Vavao Afemai | Scrum-half | May 30, 2014 | Japan | | Tokyo | |
| 518 | Oneone Fa'afou Soisoi | Flanker | May 30, 2014 | Japan | | Tokyo | |
| 519 | Patrick Fa'apale | Fly-half | May 30, 2014 | Japan | | Tokyo | |
| 520 | Jake Grey | Prop | May 30, 2014 | Japan | | Tokyo | |
| 521 | Aniseko Sio | Prop | May 30, 2014 | Japan | | Tokyo | |
| 522 | Tulolo Tulolo | Fullback | May 30, 2014 | Japan | | Tokyo | |
| 523 | Sam Aiono | (Prop) | May 30, 2014 | Japan | | Tokyo | |
| 524 | Lio Lolo | (Flanker) | May 30, 2014 | Japan | | Tokyo | |
| 525 | Vaiofaga Simanu | (Fly-half) | May 30, 2014 | Japan | | Tokyo | |
| 526 | Kaino Thomsen | (Centre) | May 30, 2014 | Japan | | Tokyo | |
| 527 | Pele Cowley | (Fullback) | Nov 8, 2014 | Italy | | Ascoli Piceno | |
| 528 | Mike Stanley | (Fly-half) | Nov 8, 2014 | Italy | | Ascoli Piceno | |
| 529 | Winston Stanley | (Centre) | Nov 8, 2014 | Italy | | Ascoli Piceno | |
| 530 | Patrick Toetu | (Prop) | Nov 8, 2014 | Italy | | Ascoli Piceno | |
| 531 | Alofa Alofa | Wing | Nov 14, 2014 | Canada | | Vannes | |
| 532 | TJ Ioane | Flanker | Nov 14, 2014 | Canada | | Vannes | |
| 533 | Rey Lee-Lo | Centre | Nov 14, 2014 | Canada | | Vannes | |
| 534 | Ahsee Tuala | Fullback | Nov 14, 2014 | Canada | | Vannes | |
| 535 | Tim Nanai-Williams | Fullback | Jul 8, 2015 | New Zealand | | Apia | |
| 536 | Failaga Afamasaga | (Centre) | Jul 8, 2015 | New Zealand | | Apia | |
| 537 | Vavae Tuilagi | No. 8 | Jul 18, 2015 | United States | | San Jose | |
| 538 | Motu Matu'u | (Hooker) | Jul 18, 2015 | United States | | San Jose | |
| 539 | Faleniu Iosi | (Fullback) | Jul 24, 2015 | Fiji | | Sacramento | |
| 540 | Francis Ieremia Saufoi | (No. 8) | Jul 29, 2015 | Canada | | Toronto | |
| 541 | Jeff Lepa | No. 8 | Jun 11, 2016 | Georgia | | Apia | |
| 542 | Albert Nikoro | Fullback | Jun 11, 2016 | Georgia | | Apia | |
| 543 | Dwayne Polataivao | Scrum-half | Jun 11, 2016 | Georgia | | Apia | |
| 544 | Talaga Alofipo | (Lock) | Jun 11, 2016 | Georgia | | Apia | |
| 545 | Malu Falaniko | (Wing) | Jun 11, 2016 | Georgia | | Apia | |
| 546 | Seilala Lam | (Hooker) | Jun 11, 2016 | Georgia | | Apia | |
| 547 | Nu'uuli Lene | (Prop) | Jun 11, 2016 | Georgia | | Apia | |
| 548 | D'Angelo Leuila | (Fly-half) | Jun 11, 2016 | Georgia | | Apia | |
| 549 | Danny Tusitala | (Scrum-half) | Jun 11, 2016 | Georgia | | Apia | |
| 550 | Greg Foe | Flanker | Jun 18, 2016 | Fiji | | Suva | |
| 551 | Genesis Mamea Lemalu | No. 8 | Nov 12, 2016 | France | | Toulouse | |
| 552 | Chris Vui | Lock | Nov 12, 2016 | France | | Toulouse | |
| 553 | Elia Elia | (Hooker) | Nov 12, 2016 | France | | Toulouse | |
| 554 | Hisa Sasagi | (Prop) | Nov 19, 2016 | Georgia | | Tbilisi | |
| 555 | Nephi Leatigaga | (Prop) | Nov 25, 2016 | Canada | | Grenoble | |
| 556 | Ope Peleseuma | (Centre) | Nov 25, 2016 | Canada | | Grenoble | |
| 557 | Kieron Fonotia | Centre | Jun 16, 2017 | New Zealand | | Auckland | |
| 558 | Paul Alo-Emile | (Prop) | Jun 16, 2017 | New Zealand | | Auckland | |
| 559 | Galu Taufale | Flanker | Jun 23, 2017 | Wales | | Apia | |
| 560 | Bronson Tauakipulu | (Prop) | Jun 23, 2017 | Wales | | Apia | |
| 561 | Tila Mealoi | (Wing) | Jun 23, 2017 | Wales | | Apia | |
| 562 | Auvasa Faleali'i | (Scrum-half) | Jul 1, 2017 | Tonga | | Nukuʻalofa | |
| 563 | Jordan Lay | (Prop) | Jul 1, 2017 | Tonga | | Nukuʻalofa | |
| 564 | Henry Taefu | (Centre) | Jul 1, 2017 | Tonga | | Nukuʻalofa | |
| 565 | Masalosalo Tutaia | (Lock) | Jul 1, 2017 | Tonga | | Nukuʻalofa | |
| 566 | James Lay | (Prop) | Jul 15, 2017 | Fiji | | Apia | |
| 567 | Donald Brighouse | Prop | Nov 11, 2017 | Scotland | | Murrayfield Stadium | |
| 568 | Josh Tyrell | Lock | Nov 11, 2017 | Scotland | | Murrayfield Stadium | |
| 569 | AJ Alatimu | (Fullback) | Nov 11, 2017 | Scotland | | Murrayfield Stadium | |
| 570 | Melani Matavao | (Scrum-half) | Nov 11, 2017 | Scotland | | Murrayfield Stadium | |
| 571 | Brandon Nansen | (Lock) | Nov 18, 2017 | Romania | | Bucharest | |
| 572 | J-J Taulagi | (Wing) | Nov 25, 2017 | England | | Twickenham Stadium | |
| 573 | Ed Fidow | Wing | Jun 9, 2018 | Fiji | | Suva | |
| 574 | Mat Luamanu | No. 8 | Jun 9, 2018 | Fiji | | Suva | |
| 575 | Rodney Iona | (Fly-half) | Jun 9, 2018 | Fiji | | Suva | |
| 576 | Ionatana Tino | (Scrum-half) | Jul 14, 2018 | Germany | | Heidelberg | |
| 577 | Kane Le'aupepe | Lock | Nov 10, 2018 | United States | | San Sebastián | |
| 578 | Ben Nee-Nee | (Lock) | Nov 10, 2018 | United States | | San Sebastián | |
| 579 | Ray Niuia | (Hooker) | Nov 10, 2018 | United States | | San Sebastián | |
| 580 | Iakopo Mapu | (No. 8) | Nov 10, 2018 | United States | | San Sebastián | |
| 581 | Afa Amosa | No. 8 | Jul 27, 2019 | Tonga | | Apia | |
| 582 | UJ Seuteni | Fly-half | Jul 27, 2019 | Tonga | | Apia | |
| 583 | Belgium Tuatagaloa | Wing | Jul 27, 2019 | Tonga | | Apia | |
| 584 | Johnny Vaili | Wing | Jul 27, 2019 | Tonga | | Apia | |
| 585 | Alamanda Motuga | (Flanker) | Jul 27, 2019 | Tonga | | Apia | |
| 586 | Alofaaga Sao | (Prop) | Jul 27, 2019 | Tonga | | Apia | |
| 587 | Senio Toleafoa | (Lock) | Jul 27, 2019 | Tonga | | Apia | |
| 588 | Henry Stowers | Flanker | Aug 3, 2019 | United States | | Suva | |
| 589 | Michael Alaalatoa | Prop | Sep 7, 2019 | Australia | | Parramatta | |
| 590 | Scott Malolua | Scrum-half | Sep 7, 2019 | Australia | | Parramatta | |
| 591 | Tomasi Alosio | Wing | Jul 10, 2021 | Tonga | | Auckland | |
| 592 | Neria Fomai | Wing | Jul 10, 2021 | Tonga | | Auckland | |
| 593 | Stacey Ili | Centre | Jul 10, 2021 | Tonga | | Auckland | |
| 594 | Olajuwon Noa | Flanker | Jul 10, 2021 | Tonga | | Auckland | |
| 595 | Sam Slade | Lock | Jul 10, 2021 | Tonga | | Auckland | |
| 596 | Tietie Tuimauga | Prop | Jul 10, 2021 | Tonga | | Auckland | |
| 597 | Jonah Aoina | (Prop) | Jul 10, 2021 | Tonga | | Auckland | |
| 598 | Theo McFarland | (Lock) | Jul 10, 2021 | Tonga | | Auckland | |
| 599 | Jonathan Taumateine | (Scrum-half) | Jul 10, 2021 | Tonga | | Auckland | |
| 600 | Kalolo Tuiloma | (Prop) | Jul 10, 2021 | Tonga | | Auckland | |
| 601 | Losi Filipo | (Wing) | Jul 17, 2021 | Tonga | | Hamilton | |
| 602 | JP Sauni | (Hooker) | Jul 17, 2021 | Tonga | | Hamilton | |
| 603 | Nigel Ah Wong | | Jul 2, 2022 | Australia A | 2022 Pacific Nations Cup | ANZ National Stadium, Suva | |
| 604 | Ere Enari | | Jul 2, 2022 | Australia A | 2022 Pacific Nations Cup | ANZ National Stadium, Suva | |
| 605 | Marco Fepulea'i | | Jul 2, 2022 | Australia A | 2022 Pacific Nations Cup | ANZ National Stadium, Suva | |
| 606 | Fritz Lee | | Jul 2, 2022 | Australia A | 2022 Pacific Nations Cup | ANZ National Stadium, Suva | |
| 607 | Aki Seiuli | | Jul 2, 2022 | Australia A | 2022 Pacific Nations Cup | ANZ National Stadium, Suva | |
| 608 | Danny Toala | | Jul 2, 2022 | Australia A | 2022 Pacific Nations Cup | ANZ National Stadium, Suva | |
| 609 | Andrew Tuala | | Jul 2, 2022 | Australia A | 2022 Pacific Nations Cup | ANZ National Stadium, Suva | |
| 610 | Lolagi Visinia | | Jul 2, 2022 | Australia A | 2022 Pacific Nations Cup | ANZ National Stadium, Suva | |
| 611 | Tumua Manu | | Jul 9, 2022 | Tonga | 2022 Pacific Nations Cup | Churchill Park, Lautoka | |
| 612 | Jordan Taufua | | Jul 9, 2022 | Tonga | 2022 Pacific Nations Cup | Churchill Park, Lautoka | |
| 613 | Michael Curry | | Jul 16, 2022 | Fiji | 2022 Pacific Nations Cup | Churchill Park, Lautoka | |
| 614 | Ezekiel Lindenmuth | | Jul 16, 2022 | Fiji | 2022 Pacific Nations Cup | Churchill Park, Lautoka | |
| 616 | Brian Alainu'uese | | Nov 5, 2022 | Italy | 2022 Autumn Internationals | Stadio Plebiscito, Padua | |
| 616 | Tala Gray | | Nov 5, 2022 | Italy | 2022 Autumn Internationals | Stadio Plebiscito, Padua | |
| 617 | Duncan Paia'aua | | Nov 5, 2022 | Italy | 2022 Autumn Internationals | Stadio Plebiscito, Padua | |
| 618 | Taleni Seu | | Nov 5, 2022 | Italy | 2022 Autumn Internationals | Stadio Plebiscito, Padua | |
| 619 | Jeffery Toomaga-Allen | | Nov 5, 2022 | Italy | 2022 Autumn Internationals | Stadio Plebiscito, Padua | |
| 620 | Des Sepulona | | Nov 19, 2022 | Romania | 2022 Autumn Internationals | Stadionul Arcul de Triumf, Bucharest | |
| 621 | Joe Perez | | Nov 19, 2022 | Romania | 2022 Autumn Internationals | Stadionul Arcul de Triumf, Bucharest | |
| 622 | Luteru Tolai | | Nov 19, 2022 | Romania | 2022 Autumn Internationals | Stadionul Arcul de Triumf, Bucharest | |
| 623 | So'otala Fa'aso'o | | Jul 22, 2023 | Japan | 2023 Pacific Nations Cup | Sapporo Dome, Sapporo | |
| 624 | Christian Leali'ifano | | Jul 22, 2023 | Japan | 2023 Pacific Nations Cup | Sapporo Dome, Sapporo | |
| 625 | Charlie Faumuina | | Jul 22, 2023 | Japan | 2023 Pacific Nations Cup | Sapporo Dome, Sapporo | |
| 626 | Miracle Faiʻilagi | | Jul 22, 2023 | Japan | 2023 Pacific Nations Cup | Sapporo Dome, Sapporo | |
| 627 | Martini Talapusi | | Jul 22, 2023 | Japan | 2023 Pacific Nations Cup | Sapporo Dome, Sapporo | |
| 628 | Steve Luatua | | Jul 29, 2023 | Fiji | 2023 Pacific Nations Cup | Apia Park, Apia | |
| 629 | Sama Malolo | | Jul 29, 2023 | Fiji | 2023 Pacific Nations Cup | Apia Park, Apia | |
| 630 | Titi Lamositele | | Aug 5, 2023 | Tonga | 2023 Pacific Nations Cup | Apia Park, Apia | |
| 631 | Lima Sopoaga | | Aug 26, 2023 | Ireland | 2023 Rugby World Cup warm-up matches | Stade Jean-Dauger, Bayonne | |
| 632 | Ben Lam | | Sep 22, 2023 | Argentina | 2023 Rugby World Cup | Stade Geoffroy-Guichard, Saint-Étienne | |
