= History of rugby union matches between Fiji and Samoa =

The Fiji and the Samoa national teams have played each other fifty-seven times with Fiji holding the majority on thirty-three wins against Samoa's twenty-one. They regularly play each other in the annual Pacific Nations Cup (PNC).

During the early years of their encounters, they played each other in sporadic small tours or in the South Pacific Championship and the Pacific-Rim Championship with other Pacific nations. They would also play each other on a friendly home-and-away-away basis, but these matches would mostly be used for Rugby World Cup (RWC) qualification. These two sides have only played each other once in a Rugby World Cup fixture, in the 2011 Rugby World Cup in New Zealand, where they met at Eden Park. Samoa won the match 27–7.

== Summary ==
Note: Summary below reflects test results by both teams.

=== Overview ===
Details	Played	Won by Fiji	Won by Samoa	Drawn	Fiji points	Samoa points
In Fiji	28	19	9	0	646	414
In Samoa	21	9	10	2	313	406
Neutral venue	8	5	2	1	214	174
Overall	57	33	21	3	1,173	994

=== Records ===
Note: Date shown in brackets indicates when the record was or last set.

Record	Fiji	Samoa
Longest winning streak	6 (21 Sep 1928 – 2 Jun 1982)	5 (10 Jun 1989 – 2 Jul 1994)
Largest points for
Home	60 (20 Jul 1996)	40 (1 Jun 1991)
Away	39 (3 Aug 2015)	36 (9 Jul 2011)
Largest winning margin
Home	60 (20 Jul 1996)	26 (9 Jul 2005)
Away	22 (15 Jul 2017)	20 (25 Sep 2011)
Most aggregate points
68 (Fiji 39–29 Samoa) (3 August 2015)

== Results ==
No.	Date	Venue	Score	Winner	Competition
1	18 August 1924	Apia Park, Apia	0–6	Fiji	1924 Fiji tour of Western Samoa and Tonga
2	19 September 1924	Apia Park, Apia	9–3	Western Samoa	1924 Fiji tour of Western Samoa and Tonga
3	21 September 1928	Apia Park, Apia	8–9	Fiji	1928 Fiji tour to Western Samoa and Tonga
4	30 August 1963	Buckhurst Park, Suva	29–6	Fiji	1963 South Pacific Games
5	5 September 1963	Backhurst Park, Suva	42–3	Fiji	1963 South Pacific Games
6	8 September 1979	National Stadium, Suva	16–13	Fiji	1979 South Pacific Games
7	27 June 1981	Churchill Park, Lautoka	15–7	Fiji	1981 Western Samoa tour of Fiji
8	4 July 1981	National Stadium, Suva	18–12	Fiji	1981 Western Samoa tour of Fiji
9	2 June 1982	Apia Park, Apia	6–6	draw	1982 Fiji tour of Western Samoa
10	15 June 1982	Chanel College field, Apia	3–14	Fiji	1982 Fiji tour of Western Samoa
11	21 August 1982	National Stadium, Suva	8–10	Western Samoa	1982 Pacific Tri-Nations
12	25 June 1983	National Stadium, Suva	0–6 (Note: Western Samoa won by virtue of the game being abandoned.)	Western Samoa	1983 Pacific Tri-Nations
13	5 September 1983	Apia Park, Apia	10–18	Fiji	1983 South Pacific Games
14	30 June 1984	National Stadium, Suva	17–10	Fiji	1984 South Pacific Championship
15	1 June 1985	Apia Park, Apia	17–18	Fiji	1985 South Pacific Championship
16	2 July 1986	Teufaiva Sport Stadium, Nukuʻalofa (Tonga)	29–9	Fiji	1986 South Pacific Championship
17	22 August 1987	National Stadium, Suva	37–14	Fiji	1987 South Pacific Championship
18	4 June 1988	Apia Par, Apia	17–17	draw	1988 South Pacific Championship
19	10 June 1989	Apia Park, Apia	32–13	Western Samoa	1989 South Pacific Championship
20	23 June 1990	Ratu Cakobau Park, Nausori	17–30	Western Samoa	1990 South Pacific Championship
21	1 June 1991	Apia Park, Apia	40–23	Western Samoa	1991 South Pacific Championship
22	20 June 1992	National Stadium, Suva	16–20	Western Samoa	1992 South Pacific Championship
23	5 June 1993	Apia Park, Apia	27–3	Western Samoa	1993 South Pacific Championship
24	2 July 1994	Prince Charles Park, Nadi	20–13	Fiji	1994 South Pacific Championship
25	1 July 1995	Apia Park, Apia	35–17	Western Samoa	1995 South Pacific Championship
26	20 July 1996	National Stadium, Suva	60–0	Fiji	1996 South Pacific Championship
27	5 July 1997	Apia Park, Apia	26–17	Samoa	1997 South Pacific Championship
28	22 September 1998	Canberra Stadium, Canberra (Australia)	26–18	Fiji	1991 Rugby World Cup Qualification
29	3 July 1999	Churchill Park, Lautoka	15–27	Samoa	1999 Pacific-rim Championship
30	3 June 2000	Apia Park, Apia	31–17	Samoa	2000 Pacific-rim Championship
31	9 June 2001	National Stadium, Suva	27–36	Samoa	2001 Pacific-rim Championship
32	23 June 2001	Apia Park, Apia	19–22	Fiji	2001 Pacific-rim Championship
33	8 July 2001	Chichibunomiya Rugby Stadium, Tokyo (Japan)	28–17	Fiji	2001 Pacific-rim Championship
34	1 June 2002	Apia Park, Apia	16–17	Fiji	2002 Pacific Tri-Nations
35	22 June 2002	Prince Charles Park, Nadi	12–22	Samoa	2002 Pacific Tri-Nations
36	12 June 2004	National Stadium, Suva	29–3	Fiji	2004 Pacific Tri-Nations
37	9 July 2005	Apia Park, Apia	36–10	Samoa	2005 Pacific Tri-Nations
38	30 July 2005	National Stadium, Suva	21–15	Fiji	2005 Pacific Tri-Nations
39	24 June 2006	Albert Park, Suva	23–20	Fiji	2005 Pacific 5 Nations
40	19 May 2007	Apia Park, Apia	8–3	Samoa	2007 Pacific Nations Cup
41	7 June 2008	Churchill Park, Lautoka	34–17	Fiji	2008 Pacific Nations Cup
42	27 June 2009	Churchill Park, Lautoka	19–14	Fiji	2009 Pacific Nations Cup
43	26 June 2010	Apia Park, Apia	31–9	Samoa	2010 Pacific Nations Cup
44	9 July 2011	National Stadium, Suva	36–18	Fiji	2011 Pacific Nations Cup
45	25 September 2011	Eden Park, Auckland (New Zealand)	7–27	Samoa	2011 Rugby World Cup
46	10 June 2012	Chichibunomiya Rugby Stadium, Tokyo (Japan)	26–29	Samoa	2012 Pacific Nations Cup
47	21 June 2014	National Stadium, Suva	13–18	Samoa	2014 Pacific Nations Cup
48	24 July 2015	Bonney Field, Sacramento (United States)	30–30	draw	2015 Pacific Nations Cup
49	3 August 2015	Swangard Stadium, Burnaby (Canada)	39–29	Fiji	2015 Pacific Nations Cup
50	18 June 2016	National Stadium, Suva	26–16	Fiji	2016 Pacific Nations Cup
51	15 July 2017	Apia Park, Apia	16–38	Fiji	2017 Pacific Nations Cup
52	9 June 2018	National Stadium, Suva	24–22	Fiji	2018 Pacific Nations Cup
53	10 August 2019	National Stadium, Suva	10–3	Fiji	2019 Pacific Nations Cup
54	16 July 2022	Churchill Park, Lautoka	20–23	Samoa	2022 Pacific Nations Cup
55	29 July 2023	Apia Park, Apia	19–33	Fiji	2023 Pacific Nations Cup
56	23 August 2024	National Stadium, Suva	42–16	Fiji	2024 Pacific Nations Cup
57	6 September 2025	Rotorua International Stadium, Rotorua	15–29	Fiji	2025 Pacific Nations Cup

== XV Results ==
Below is a list of matches that Samoa has awarded matches test match status by virtue of awarding caps, but Fiji did not award caps.

Date	Venue	Score	Winner	Competition
18 June 1955	Apia Park, Apia	3–26	Fiji	1955 Fiji tour of Samoa
11 June 1955	Apia Park, Apia	6–14	Fiji	1955 Fiji tour of Samoa
4 June 1955	Apia Park, Apia	11–18	Fiji	1955 Fiji tour of Samoa
