= 1988 Western Samoa rugby union tour of Britain and Ireland =

Summary
P	W	D	L
Total
10	4	0	6
Test match
2	0	0	2
Opponent
P	W	D	L
Ireland
1	0	0	1
Wales
1	0	0	1

The 1988 Samoa rugby union tour of Britain and Ireland was a series of ten rugby union matches played in October and November 1988 in Wales and Ireland by the Samoa national rugby union team, who competed under the name of Western Samoa at the time. Samoa lost both their international matches but won four of their eight non-international games against club and regional teams.

== Touring Squad ==
- Manager: Fesalai Satini
- Coach: Richard Cook
- Assistant Coach: Peter Schuster
- Technical Advisor: Barry Taylor

=== Fullbacks ===
- Andrew Aiolupo (Note: Reported in the official tour programme as "Aneterea [sic] Aiolupo") (Moata'a)
- Tupo Fa'amasino (Vaimoso)

=== Three-quarters ===
- Lino Foai (Note: Reported in the official tour programme as "Lino Faoi[sic]") (Marist St. Joseph)
- Lolani Koko (Tuamasaga) (captain)
- Tauveve Ugapo (Vaimoso)
- Keneti Sio (SCOPA)
- John Ah Kuoi (Marist St. Joseph)

=== Half-backs ===
- Filipo Saena (Moata'a)
- Vincent Fepulea'i (Marist St. Joseph)
- Phineas Young (Apia)
- Sepe Tupuola (Iavai)
- Milovale Moke (Vaiala)
- Petaia Nee Nee (Note: Reported in the official tour programme as "Petaia Petaia") (Apia)

=== Forwards ===
- Malaki Iupeli (Vaimoso)
- Vaivase Fa'asua (Moataa)
- Tuise Sefo (Moata'a)
- Reupena Rimoni (Moata'a)
- Saini Lemamea (Lefaga)
- Lafaele Mano (Marist St. Joseph)
- Lomitusi Sasi (Iavai)
- Daryl Williams (Apia)
- Stan To'omalatai (Vaiala)
- Fineaso Aima'asu (Moata'a)
- Peter Fatialofa (Tuamasaga)

== Matches ==
Scores and results list Samoa's score first.

Opposing Team	Result	For	Against	Date	Venue
Welsh Counties Under-23	Won	19	18	11 October	Llanelli
Newbridge	Won	16	15	15 October	Newbridge
North Wales	Won	24	12	19 October	Wrexham
Bridgend	Lost	17	21	22 October	Bridgend
Aberavon	Lost	11	21	26 October	Port Talbot
IRELAND	Lost	22	49	29 October	Lansdowne Road, Dublin
Ulster	Lost	15	47	2 November	Ravenhill, Belfast
Connacht	Lost	18	25	5 November	Galway
Pontypridd	Won	23	22	8 November	Pontypridd
WALES	Lost	6	28	12 November	National Stadium, Cardiff
