= 2005 Samoa rugby union tour of Britain and Argentina =

Summary
P	W	D	L
Total
3	1	0	2
Test match
3	1	0	2
Opponent
P	W	D	L
Scotland
1	0	0	1
England
1	0	0	1
Argentina
1	1	0	0

The 2005 Samoa rugby union tour of Britain and Argentina was a series of matches played in November–December 2005 in Scotland, England and Argentina by Samoa national rugby union team. Samoa lost both match in Europe, but win against a young Argentine team (seven players made debuts).

== Results ==
19 November 2005

Scotland	18–11	Samoa
Try: Di Rollo, Hogg; Con: Paterson; Pen: Paterson 2		Try: A. Tuilagi; Pen: Warren 2

Murrayfield Stadium, Edinburgh
Attendance: 15,000
Referee: Alain Rolland (Ireland)

Scotland: 15. Chris Paterson, 14. Rory Lamont, 13. Marcus Di Rollo, 12. Andrew Henderson, 11. Sean Lamont, 10. Dan Parks, 9. Chris Cusiter, 8. Simon Taylor, 7. Ally Hogg, 6. Jason White (c), 5. Scott Murray, 4. Craig Hamilton, 3. Craig Smith, 2. Scott Lawson, 1. Allan Jacobsen – Replacements: 16. Dougie Hall, 17. Gavin Kerr, 18. Alastair Kellock, 19. Kelly Brown, 20. Mike Blair, 21. Phil Godman, 22. Hugo Southwell
Samoa: 15. Roger Warren, 14. Lome Fa'atau, 13. Andy Tuilagi, 12. Eliota Fuimaono-Sapolu, 11. Alesana Tuilagi, 10. Tanner Vili, 9. Garrick Cowley, 8. Daniel Farani, 7. Iosefa Taina (yellow card) , 6. Semo Sititi (c), 5. Jonny Fa'amatuainu, 4. Daniel Leo, 3. Census Johnston, 2. Mahonri Schwalger, 1. Justin Va'a – Replacements: 16. Loleni Tafunai, 17. Kas Lealamanua, 18. Leo Lafaiali'i, 19. Paul Tupai, 20. Notise Tauafao, 21. Aukuso Collins, 22. Sailosi Tagicakibau

26 November 2005

England	40–3	Samoa
Try: lis, Hodgson, Varndell; Voyce 2 Con: Hodgson 3 Pen: Hodgson 3		Pen: Vili

Twickenham, London
Attendance: 62,000
Referee: S. Lawrence (South Africa)

England: 15. Josh Lewsey, 14. Mark Cueto, 13. James Simpson-Daniel, 12. Mike Tindall, 11. Tom Voyce, 10. Charlie Hodgson, 9. Harry Ellis, 8. Martin Corry (c), 7. Lewis Moody (red card) , 6. Pat Sanderson, 5. Louis Deacon, 4. Steve Borthwick, 3. Matt Stevens, 2. Steve Thompson, 1. Andrew Sheridan – Replacements: 16. Lee Mears, 17. Perry Freshwater, 18. Simon Shaw, 19. James Forrester, 20. Peter Richards, 21. Olly Barkley, 22. Tom Varndell
Samoa: 15. Sailosi Tagicakibau, 14. Lome Fa'atau, 13. Elvis Seveali'i, 12. Eliota Fuimaono-Sapolu, 11. Alesana Tuilagi (red card) , 10. Tanner Vili (yellow card) , 9. Steve So'oialo, 8. Daniel Farani, 7. Semo Sititi (c), 6. Leo Lafaiali'i, 5. Pelu Taele-Pavihi, 4. Daniel Leo, 3. Census Johnston, 2. Mahonri Schwalger, 1. Justin Va'a (yellow card) – Replacements: 16. Loleni Tafunai, 17. Kas Lealamanua, 18. Paul Tupai, 19. Jonny Fa'amatuainu, 20. Garrick Cowley, 21. Andy Tuilagi, 22. Lolo Lui

3 December 2005

Argentina	12–28	Samoa
Try: Agulla, Fernández Lobbe; Con: Fernández Miranda		Try: Johnston, Sititi; Tagicakibau; Con: Warren 2 Pen: Warren 2 Drop: Warren

Stadium of B.A. C & R, Buenos Aires
Referee: Nigel Owens (Wales)

Argentina: 15. Francisco Bosch, 14. Horacio Agulla, 13. Miguel Avramovic, 12. Gonzalo Tiesi, 11. Pablo Gomez Cora, 10. Juan Fernández Miranda (c), 9. Lucio Lopez Fleming, 8. Juan Martín Fernández Lobbe (yellow card) , 7. Agustin Creevy, 6. Santiago Sanz, 5. Mariano Sambucetti, 4. Jaime Arocena Mesones, 3. Marcos Ayerza, 2. Agustin Costa Repetto, 1. Gaston de Robertis – Replacements: 16. Matias Cortese (yellow card) , 17. Sebastien Rondinelli, 20. Nicolas Vergallo – Unused: 18. Santiago Artese, 19. Álvaro Galindo, 21. Marcelo Bosch, 22. Gonzalo Sarasqueta
Samoa: 15. Lolo Lui, 14. Lome Fa'atau, 13. Andy Tuilagi, 12. Eliota Fuimaono-Sapolu, 11. Sailosi Tagicakibau, 10. Roger Warren, 9. Garrick Cowley (yellow card) , 8. Daniel Farani, 7. Semo Sititi (c), 6. Paul Tupai, 5. Pelu Taele-Pavihi, 4. Daniel Leo, 3. Census Johnston (yellow card) , 2. Mahonri Schwalger, 1. Justin Va'a – Replacements: 16. Loleni Tafunai, 17. Tamato Leupolu, 18. Jonny Fa'amatuainu, 19. Ulia Ulia, 20. Notise Tauafao, 21. Aukuso Collins, 22. Kiri Mariner
