= Quintan Sanft =

- Full name: Quintan Albert Sanft
- Born: 26 May 1977 (age 49) Apia, Samoa
- School: De La Salle College
- Notable relative: Doug Sanft (brother)

Rugby union career
Amateur team(s)
Years	Team	Apps	(Points)
2000–01, 2006–2023	Kirkcaldy	193	(1126)
2005–06	Biggar		
International career
Years	Team	Apps	(Points)
2000	Samoa	2	(6)

Quintan Sanft is a Samoan former rugby union international. He is currently the head coach of Kirkcaldy RFC in Scotland.

Sanft joined Kirkcaldy in September 2000 for the club's first season in Premiership Division One.

In November 2000, Sanft was capped twice for Samoa in their tour of Scotland and Wales, kicking a penalty in each of the test match defeats and the game against Scotland 'A'. He also later made international appearances for Samoa's rugby sevens side in 2004 at Twickenham and in 2009 at Murrayfield.

Returning to Scotland, he signed for Biggar RFC. Sanft then rejoined Kirkcaldy as player-coach ahead of the 2006–07 season, also taking on the job of development officer. Concentrating on the head coach role, he made his last appearance as a player for Kirkcaldy in 2023.

In 2018 Sanft also joined the coaching setup at St Andrews University as backs coach.

== See also ==
- List of Samoa national rugby union players
