= 2005 Pacific Tri-Nations =

Rugby competition

Tournament details
- Countries: Fiji; Samoa; Tonga
- Tournament format(s): Round-robin
- Date: 25 June - 30 July 2005

Tournament statistics
- Teams: 3
- Matches played: 6
- Tries scored: 28 (4.67 per match)
- Top point scorer(s): Roger Warren (Samoa) (74 points)
- Top try scorer(s): Alesana Tuilagi (Samoa) (5 tries)

Final
- Champions: Samoa (11th title)
- Runners-up: Fiji

The 2005 Pacific Tri-Nations was the last Pacific Tri-Nations rugby union competition held between Fiji, Samoa, Tonga before the competition was replaced by the Pacific 5 Nations. The tournament ran from 25 June to 30 July and acted as part of the Oceania qualification for the 2007 Rugby World Cup. Samoa won the tournament with Fiji coming second, meaning both qualified for the 2007 Rugby World Cup while Tonga had to enter a repechage.

== Table ==
2005 Pacific Tri-Nations
	Team	Played	Won	Drawn	Lost	Points For	Points Against	Points Difference	Tries For	Tries Against	Points
1	Samoa	4	3	0	1	131	78	+53	12	7	10
2	Fiji	4	3	0	1	74	81	-7	8	7	10
3	Tonga	4	0	0	4	77	123	-46	8	14	4

== Results ==
25 June 2005

Fiji	19 – 11	Tonga
Try: Bobo; Con: Little; Pen: Little (3); Bai		Try: Hala'ufia; Pen: Hola 'Ota'ota

National Stadium, Suva

2 July 2005

Samoa	50 – 28	Tonga
Try: Alesana Tuilagi (4); Fa'atau; Anitelea Tuilagi; Con: Warren (4); Pen: Warren (4)		Try: Filise; Va'enuku; Tonga; Con: Hola (2); Pen: Hola (3)

Apia Park, Apia

9 July 2005

Samoa	36 – 10	Fiji
Try: Sititi; Tuilagi; Tafunai; Con: Warren (3); Pen: Warren (4); Drop: Warren		Try: Ligairi; Con: Little; Pen: Little

Apia Park, Apia

16 July 2005

Tonga	19 – 24	Fiji
Try: Ma'asi; Lutui; Makasini; Con: Apikotoa (2)		Try: Nadridri; Luveitasau (2); Unknown Scorer; Con: Little, Bai

Teufaiva Stadium, Nuku'alofa

23 July 2005

Tonga	19 – 30	Samoa
Try: Va'enuku; Con: Apikotoa; Pen: Apikotoa (4)		Try: Fa'atau; Lemi; Farani; Con: Warren (3); Pen: Warren (3)

Teufaiva Stadium, Nuku'alofa

30 July 2005

Fiji	21 – 15	Samoa
Try: Bai; Kunavore; Con: Bai; Pen: Bai (3)		Pen: Warren (5)

National Stadium, Suva

== See also ==
- 2007 Rugby World Cup qualifying
- Pacific Tri-Nations
