= Doug Sanft =

- Full name: Douglas Gordon Sanft
- Born: Wellington, New Zealand
- Height: 5 ft 11 in (180 cm)
- Weight: 207 lb (94 kg)
- School: De La Salle College
- Notable relative: Quintan Sanft (brother)

Rugby union career
- Position: Fly-half / Centre
Amateur team(s)
Years	Team	Apps	(Points)
2001	Kirkcaldy	3	(2)
International career
Years	Team	Apps	(Points)
2006	Samoa	1	(2)

Douglas Gordon Sanft is a New Zealand–born Samoan former rugby union international.

Born in Wellington, Sanft spent his childhood in Samoa but finished his schooling at Auckland's De La Salle College. He is a brother of Samoa international Quintan Sanft.

Sanft, primarily a fly-half, played his provincial rugby with Counties Manukau and Poverty Bay. He had several seasons in England for clubs including Halifax and the Cornish Pirates, as well as a stint with Spanish club CRC Madrid

In 2006, Sanft was capped for Samoa in a match against Japan in New Plymouth, which they won by 44 points.

Sanft was coach of the Manukau Rovers side that won the Gallaher Shield in 2022, to end a 49-year title drought. He is director of rugby and head coach at Marist Brothers Old Boys.

== See also ==
- List of Samoa national rugby union players
