= Pama Petia =

Samoan rugby union player (born 1980)

- Full name: Pama Raymond Petia
- Born: 24 August 1980 (age 46)
- Height: 6 ft 1 in (185 cm)
- Weight: 250 lb (113 kg)
- School: St Paul's Collegiate School

Rugby union career
- Position: Flanker / No. 8
Senior career
Years	Team	Apps	(Points)
2000	Thames Valley	10	(20)
2003–09	Hawke's Bay	29	(10)
International career
Years	Team	Apps	(Points)
2003	Samoa	1	(0)

Pama Raymond Petia (born 24 August 1980) is a Samoan former international rugby union player.

Educated at St Paul's Collegiate School in Hamilton, Petia played his rugby as a loose forward and was capped once by Samoa, against Namibia in Windhoek in 2003. He played with Thames Valley and Hawke's Bay.

Petia received a three-and-a-half-year jail sentence for money laundering in 2021, after delivering $2 million in cash to a bikie as part of a West Australian drug-smuggling operation.

== See also ==
- List of Samoa national rugby union players
