= John Hunter (rugby union) =

Scotland international rugby union player

- Born: John Murray Hunter; 10 November 1920 Kirkcaldy, Scotland
- Died: 31 March 2006 (aged 85) Edinburgh, Scotland
- School: Kirkcaldy High School; Fettes College
- University: Clare College, Cambridge

Rugby union career
- Position: Lock
Amateur team(s)
Years	Team	Apps	(Points)
- Kirkcaldy
–	Cambridge University		
–	London Scottish		
Provincial / State sides
Years	Team	Apps	(Points)
1946	Whites Trial		
1946	Blues Trial		
International career
Years	Team	Apps	(Points)
1947	Scotland	1	(0)

John Hunter (10 November 1920 – 31 March 2006) was a Scotland international rugby union player.

== Rugby Union career ==
=== Amateur career ===
He gained a foundation scholarship to Fettes, after being in Kirkcaldy High School for one year. He became head of the school at Fettes, and played rugby for the school XV.

He played for Kirkcaldy, although he was more usually found in their 2nd XV.

The Fife Free Press & Kirkcaldy Guardian of Saturday 10 December 1949 explained:

Then, since the last war. there was the classic instance of J. M. Hunter, son of the former minister of Abbotshall Church, who was capped in season 1946-47. His clubs that season, were jocularly referred to locally as being Kirkcaldy 2nd XV and Cambridge and Scotland. However, the truth of the matter was that while a member of the Kirkcaldy club he was unable to turn out regularly owing to his studies. Nevertheless, when he was available he sportingly insisted that no regular player from the 1st XV should be relegated his behalf, hence his irregular appearances with the 2nd XV. As rugby enthusiasts will agree, a most sporting gesture.

Dunfermline looked for his services but Hunter instead moved south to study at Cambridge University.

Hunter then played for Cambridge University.

After university, he then played for London Scottish.

=== Provincial career ===
He played for Whites Trial in the 20 December 1946 match. He so impressed that at half time he was to replace Frank Coutts in the Blues Trial side at half-time.

He was left out of the final January trial match.

The Scotsman newspaper of Thursday 9 January 1947 noting:

J . M . Hunter, the Fettesian who has just gone down from Cambridge and now plays for London Scottish, has been left out — an omission for which there may be a reason other than his form but which at least represents a surprise after his receiving a cap against the French.

=== International career ===
Hunter was capped by Scotland just the once. The cap came in 1947 against France.

The Fifeshire Advertiser of 4 January 1947 noted:

KIRKCALDY'S RUGBY RECORD. J. M. HUNTER IS FOURTH 'CAP.' Kirkcaldy can be proud of its part international rugby. J. M. Hunter, who played for Scotland against France on Wednesday is the fourth Kirkcaldy Rugby Club player represent his country. First was D. D. Howie, who played against England, Ireland, Wales, and South Africa in 1912, and against Wales and France in 1913. G. Thom was capped in 1920 against England, Ireland, Wales and France. R. A. Howie represented Scotland in 1924 against England Ireland, Wales, and France, and in 1925 against England, Ireland, and Wales. J. M. Hunter, who is the son of the Rev. J. M. Hunter, B.D., Abbotshall Church, played several games for Kirkcaldy last season, after he was demobbed. He is at present at Cambridge University.

== Military career ==
He joined the army in 1941 in the Second World War and was rapidly promoted. He became a Lieutenant and then Acting Captain in the Rifle Brigade; and was awarded the Military Cross in 1943 for his service in North Africa.

The Fife Free Press & Kirkcaldy Guardian of Saturday 4 January 1947 noted:

RUGBY STAR'S SUCCESS. J. M Hunter, formerly of Kirkcaldy Rugby Club, who gained his college blue this season for Cambridge, was representative in the Scottish team which was defeated by France on Wednesday. For the first time the Scottish Rugby Union has recognised this game a full international and all the players who took part will be awarded caps. Last season Hunter played regularly for Kirkcaldy Ist XV, and was undoubtedly one of the leading forwards in the county. This season Dunfermline were keen procure his services, but Hunter went down South to resume his studies and since then has been a regular player in the Cambridge Varsity team. While several occasions Kirkcaldy have had representatives the Midlands trials they have not had an internationalist since Bob Howie was chosen represent Scotland and Britain twenty years ago. The new internationalist is a son of Rev. J M Hunter B.D. of Abbotshall Church, Kirkcaldy. He served with the Rifle Brigade for five years, and was awarded the Military Cross for his services in the North African campaign. He was wounded three times and was some months in hospital. He returned to Cambridge the beginning of 1946 where he has been engaged in research work. He already holds his classics degree.

== Family ==
His father was the Rev. John Mercer Hunter (1880-1968) and his mother Frances Margaret Martin (1888-1953).

He married Margaret Mary Phyllis Cursiter (1927-1997) in Edinburgh in 1948 at Murrayfield Parish Church. She was the daughter of Stanley Cursiter, director of the National Galleries of Scotland.
