= Kose Seinafo =

- Full name: Sofaro Kose Seinafo
- Born: 1 November 1963 (age 63)

Rugby union career
- Position(s): Wing, Centre
Provincial / State sides
Years	Team	Apps	(Points)
1988–93	Canterbury	33	(100)
International career
Years	Team	Apps	(Points)
1992	Samoa	1	(0)

Sofaro Kose Seinafo (born 1 November 1963) is a Samoan former rugby union international.

== Biography ==
In 1988 Seinafo made his debut in first-class rugby for Canterbury. In his first season he played three matches and scored eight points. His most prolific season was in 1992 when he scored 50 points in 20 matches.

Seinafo played internationally for Samoa. He played in one test match in 1992.

After retiring from playing he was employed as the ports director at Catholic Cathedral College. He was a co-coach and selector for the Canterbury Colts.

== See also ==
- List of Samoa national rugby union players
