= Kiri Mariner =

- Born: 26 August 1984 (age 42) Western Samoa
- Height: 6 ft 0 in (183 cm)
- Weight: 210 lb (95 kg)

Rugby union career
- Position: Centre / Wing
Senior career
Years	Team	Apps	(Points)
2006–09	RC Toulon	19	(10)
2009–10	Stade Phocéen	14	(25)
2010–17	US Montauban	85	(70)
International career
Years	Team	Apps	(Points)
2005	Samoa	1	(0)

Kiri Mariner (born 26 August 1984) is a Samoan former professional rugby union player.

A three-quarter, Mariner was a physically strong player, first capped for Samoa in 2003 in rugby sevens. He was a member of Samoa's team at the 2005 Rugby World Cup Sevens in Hong Kong and later gained his only XV cap on that year's tour of Argentina, as a centre in a win over the Pumas in Buenos Aires.

Mariner, based in France since 2006, was in the RC Toulon side that won the Pro D2 tournament in 2008. He played with Stade Phocéen in the 2009–10 season, then crossed to US Montauban, where he won a Fédérale 1 title in 2014.

== See also ==
- List of Samoa national rugby union players
