= Kirkcaldy RFC =

Scottish rugby union club, based in Kirkcaldy

Coordinates: 56.10373°N 3.17181°W

Kirkcaldy
- Full name: Kirkcaldy Rugby Football Club
- Union: Scottish Rugby Union
- Nickname: The Blues
- Founded: 1873; 153 years ago
- Location: Kirkcaldy, Scotland
- Ground: Beveridge Park
- President: George Shields
- Director of Rugby: Colin Parsons
- Coach: Quintan Sanft
- Captain: Finlay Smith
- Most appearances: Gavin McKenzie (312)
- Top scorer: John Mitchell (1,472)
- League(s): Men: Scottish National League Division Two; Women: Scottish Womens Midlands & East Two
- 2024–25: Men: Scottish National League Division Two, 4th of 9 Women: Scottish Womens Midlands & East Two, 3rd of 8
1st kit	2nd kit

Official website
- kirkcaldyrugby.co.uk

Kirkcaldy Rugby Football Club is a rugby union club from Kirkcaldy, Fife, Scotland. The men's side currently plays in Scottish National League Division Two and the women's side currently plays in Scottish Womens Midlands & East Two.

== History ==
The club was established in 1873 Home games are played at Beveridge Park.

When league rugby began in 1973, the team was initially placed in Division 4 of the Scottish League Championship. They progressed through the divisions and eventually gained promotion to Premiership Division One at the turn of the century, competing for two seasons in the top tier of Scottish club rugby.

Their head coach, former Samoan internationalist Quintan Sanft, has been with the club since 2006.

The women's team was established in the 1993–94 season. Two matches in the 1994 Women's Rugby World Cup plate competition were played at Beveridge Park.

== Kirkcaldy Sevens ==
The club host the annual Kirkcaldy Sevens tournament. First played in 1950, entrants compete for the Heggie Cup.

== Honours ==
=== Men ===
- Scottish National League Division One
  - Runners-up: 1999–00
- Scottish National League Division Two
  - Champions (4): 1988–89, 1996–97, 2008–09, 2017–18
- Scottish Rugby Shield
  - Winners: 2001–02
  - Runners-up: 2007–08
- Kirkcaldy Sevens: 1958, 1989, 1990, 1992, 1993, 1995, 1998, 1999, 2000, 2004, 2006, 2007, 2012, 2018
- Dundee HSFP Sevens: 1924
- Crieff Sevens: 2012, 2017
- Waid Academy F.P. Sevens: 1954, 1955, 1956, 1959, 1967, 1998
- Glenrothes Sevens: 1989, 1990, 1994
- Midlands District Sevens: 1927, 1956, 1970, 1993, 1995, 1996
- Howe of Fife Sevens: 1966
- Stirling Sevens: 1966, 1969, 1976
- Portobello Sevens: 2024

=== Women ===
- Scottish National League Division One
  - Champions: 2013–14
- Scottish National League
  - Champions: 2012–13
- Scottish National Plate
  - Winners: 2007–08
  - Runners-up: 2008–09
- Scottish National Bowl
  - Runners-up: 2016–17
- Kirkcaldy Sevens: 2006
- Mull Sevens: 2003, 2007

== Notable players ==
=== Scotland internationalists ===
- (Scotland) Bob Howie (also British Lions)
- (Scotland) Dave Howie
- (Scotland) John Hunter
- (Scotland) Willie Anderson

=== Samoa internationalist ===
- (Samoa) Quintan Sanft

== See also ==
- Dunfermline RFC
- Glenrothes RFC
- Howe of Fife RFC
