= 1982 Pacific Tri-Nations =

Tournament details
- Countries: Fiji; Tonga; Western Samoa
- Tournament format(s): Round-robin
- Date: 21–28 August 1982

Tournament statistics
- Teams: 3
- Matches played: 3
- Tries scored: 14 (4.67 per match)
- Top point scorer(s): Taufusi Salesa (Western Samoa); 13 points
- Top try scorer(s): Sanivalati Laulau (Fiji); 3 tries

Final
- Champions: Western Samoa (1st title)
- Runners-up: Fiji

The 1982 Pacific Tri-Nations was the first edition of the Pacific Tri-Nations tournament competed for between Fiji, Tonga and Western Samoa with each team playing the other two teams once. Western Samoa were the inaugural winners winning both of their matches.

== Table ==
	Team	Played	Won	Drawn	Lost	PF	PA	PD	TF	TA	Points
1	Western Samoa	2	2	0	0	21	11	+10	4	2	4
2	Fiji	2	1	0	1	47	14	+33	9	3	2
3	Tonga	2	0	0	2	7	50	-43	1	9	0

== Fixtures ==
21 August 1982

Fiji	8-10	Western Samoa

National Stadium, Suva

25 August 1982

Tonga	3-11	Western Samoa

28 August 1982

Fiji	37-4	Tonga

National Stadium, Suva
