= 1989 Western Samoa rugby union tour of Europe =

Summary
P	W	D	L
Total
12	8	0	4
Test match
3	2	0	1
Opponent
P	W	D	L
Germany
1	1	0	0
Belgium
1	1	0	0
Romania
1	0	0	1

The 1989 Samoa rugby union tour of Europe was a series of matches played between September and November 1989 in Europe by Samoa national rugby union team. The visit Germany, Belgium., Romania, France and England.

== Results ==
27 September 1989

Germany North West	0 - 118	Samoa XV

30 September 1989

Germany	9 - 54	Western Samoa

Bonn

3 October 1989

Belgium	8 - 37	Western Samoa

Brussels

7 October 1989

Belgium B	12 - 38	Samoa XV

Visé

11 October 1989

Romania B	15 - 10	Samoa XV

Bârlad

14 October 1989

Romania	32 - 24	Western Samoa

Bucharest

25 October 1989

France Sel.	48 - 20	Samoa XV

28 October 1989

France Sel.	16 - 15	Samoa XV

1 November 1989

French Police	25 - 35	Samoa XV

4 November 1989

Oxford University	19 - 22	Samoa XV

Oxford

8 November 1989

West Hartlepool R.F.C.	0 - 10	Samoa XV

West Hartlepool

11 November 1989

Cambridge University	13 - 33	Samoa XV

Cambridge
