= Pacific Tri-Nations =

The Pacific Tri-Nations was the traditional rugby union series between Tonga, Fiji and Samoa. It was established in 1982 with the Samoan team, then known as Western Samoa, winning the tournament. In 2006 it was replaced by the IRB Pacific 5 Nations which was then renamed the Pacific Nations Cup.

Between 1993 and 1995 the winner of the previous year's tournament played in the Super 10 competition alongside sides from Australia, New Zealand and South Africa.

In 2000, for the first time, they played a home and away Pacific tri-nations series, which instantly established itself as the number three series in the world after the Six Nations and the Tri-nations series.

In 2005, the tournament (won by Samoa) was also used to determine qualification for the Rugby World Cup 2007 (to be held in France). The top two teams (Samoa and Fiji) qualify automatically, while Tonga had to win a two-legged match, against the top team out of six small teams in Oceania (Vanuatu, Cook Islands, Solomon Islands, Tahiti, Niue and Papua New Guinea), before heading to the Repechage Round to face a nation from Asia for a spot in RWC 2007.

The first Women's Pacific Tri-Nations was held in 2006, and was won by Samoa.

== Past winners ==
- 1982 – Western Samoa
- 1983 – Fiji
- 1984 – Tonga
- 1985 – Fiji
- 1986 – Fiji
- 1987 – Western Samoa
- 1988 – Western Samoa
- 1989 – Western Samoa
- 1990 – Tonga
- 1991 – Western Samoa
- 1992 – Western Samoa
- 1993 – Western Samoa
- 1994 – Tonga
- 1995 – Fiji
- 1996 – Fiji
- 1997 – Western Samoa
- 1998 – Fiji
- 1999 – Fiji
- 2000 – Samoa
- 2001 – Samoa
- 2002 – Fiji
- 2003 – No tournament due to the 2003 Rugby World Cup
- 2004 – Fiji
- 2005 – Samoa

Women's Pacific Tri-Nations

- 2006 Samoa

== See also ==
- Fiji national rugby union team
- Samoa national rugby union team
- Tonga national rugby union team
- Pacific Islands Rugby Alliance
- Pacific Nations Cup
- Women's Pacific Tri-Nations
