= 2000 Samoa rugby union tour of Scotland and Wales =

Summary
P	W	D	L
Total
3	0	0	3
Test match
2	0	0	2
Opponent
P	W	D	L
Scotland
1	0	0	1
Wales
1	0	0	1

The Samoa national rugby union team played a series of matches in November 2000 in Scotland and Wales.

== Results ==
Scores and results list Samoa's points tally first.

Opponent	For	Against	Date	Venue	Status
Wales	6	50	11 November 2000	Millennium, Cardiff	Test match
Scotland A	24	37	14 November 2000	Murrayfield, Edinburgh	Tour match
Scotland	8	31	18 November 2000	Murrayfield, Edinburgh	Test match
