= National Stadium, Cardiff =

Former stadium at Cardiff Arms Park, Wales

National Stadium
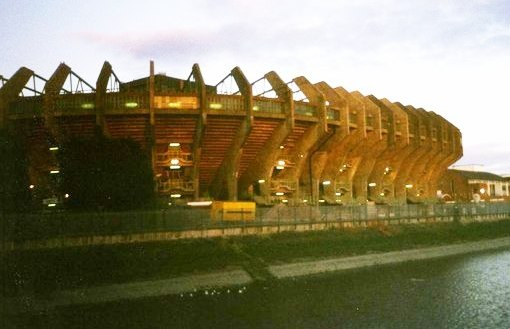
- The West Stand of the National Stadium
- Interactive map of National Stadium
- Location: Cardiff, Wales
- Coordinates: 51°28′43″N 3°10′57″W
- Owner: Welsh Rugby Union (WRU)
- Capacity: 65,000 (1984); 53,000 (1997)
- Surface: Grass

Construction
- Opened: 17 October 1970 (Note: first opening and first match with only the north stand completed); 7 April 1984 (Note: official opening of fully completed stadium)
- Closed: 27 April 1997
- Demolished: 1997
- Cost: £9 million
- Architects: Osborne V. Webb & Partners
- Main contractors: G. A. Williamson and Andrew Scott & Co

Tenants
- Wales national rugby union team (1970–97); Wales national football team (1989–97); Major sporting events hosted 1991 Rugby World Cup; 1996 Heineken Cup Final; 1997 Heineken Cup Final

The National Stadium was a rugby union and football stadium located on the Cardiff Arms Park site in Cardiff, Wales. Following plans to replace the rugby ground built in 1881, construction of the National Stadium began in 1968. The stadium served as the home of the Wales national rugby union team from 1970 and the Wales national football team from 1989. It was demolished in 1997 to make way for the construction of the Millennium Stadium.

== History ==
=== Background ===
The National Stadium, also known as the Welsh National Rugby Ground, was designed by Osborne V Webb & Partners and constructed by G. A. Williamson & Associates of Porthcawl and Andrew Scott & Company of Port Talbot.

=== Redevelopment ===
With the agreement of the Cardiff Athletic Club, the freehold of the south ground was transferred to the sole ownership of the Welsh Rugby Union (WRU) in July 1968. This allowed work to begin on the new National Stadium. Glamorgan County Cricket Club relocated to Sophia Gardens, the cricket ground to the north was demolished, and a new rugby union stadium was built for Cardiff RFC, who vacated the south ground. This enabled the National Stadium to be constructed for the exclusive use of the national rugby union team.

On 17 October 1970, the new North Stand and the Cardiff RFC ground were completed, with the North Stand costing just over £1 million. The West Stand was opened in 1977, and the new East Terrace was completed by March 1980. By the time the final South Stand had been built and the stadium was officially opened on 7 April 1984, the South Stand alone had cost £4.5 million. The initial project estimate was £2.25 million, but by completion in 1984, the total expenditure was nearly four times that figure.

=== Official opening ===
Although the stadium was not officially opened until 7 April 1984, it had been in continuous use since the WRU takeover in 1968. The opening was marked by a match between Wales and a WRU President's XV composed of players from other international teams on 17 October 1970. Wales won 27–17.

The original capacity was 65,000, later reduced to 53,000 for safety reasons. Of this, 11,000 places were on the East Terrace. Conversion to an all-seater stadium would have reduced the capacity further to 47,500. This figure was significantly lower than Twickenham and other major rugby venues, and also below the demand for tickets for major events.

A world record crowd of 56,000 for a rugby union club match attended the WRU Challenge Cup final on 7 May 1988, when Llanelli RFC defeated Neath RFC 28–13. The first evening international under floodlights was played on 4 September 1991 at 8.00 pm between Wales and France.

The last international match at the National Stadium was played on 15 March 1997, when Wales faced England. The final fixture at the stadium was held on 26 April 1997, when Cardiff defeated Swansea 33–26 in the SWALEC Cup (WRU Challenge Cup) final.

=== Demolition ===
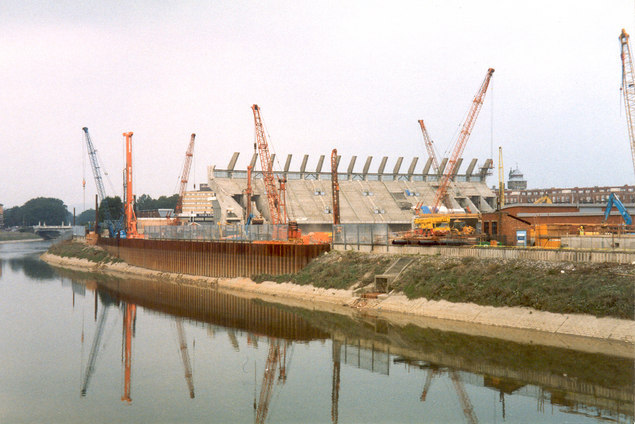
Demolition of the stadium with only the North Stand remaining. This formed part of the Millennium Stadium.

In 1995, it was decided to demolish the stadium as it no longer met the standards of other major European venues. Demolition began in 1997 to make way for the construction of the Millennium Stadium, which opened in 1999.

== Usage ==
=== Rugby union ===
The National Stadium is best known as the venue for what has been described as "the greatest try ever scored" by Gareth Edwards for the Barbarians against New Zealand in what has also been referred to as "the greatest match ever played" on 27 January 1973. The Barbarians won the match 23–11, which would equate to 27–13 under the modern scoring system.

The scorers were:

- Barbarians – Tries: Gareth Edwards, Fergus Slattery, John Bevan, J. P. R. Williams; Conversions: Phil Bennett (2); Penalty: Phil Bennett
- New Zealand – Tries: Grant Batty (2); Penalty: Joseph Karam

The stadium hosted four matches during the 1991 Rugby World Cup, including the third-place play-off. It was also the venue for the inaugural Heineken Cup Final of the 1995–96 season, when Toulouse defeated Cardiff RFC 21–18 after extra time before a crowd of 21,800. The following year’s final, in the 1996–97 season, was also staged at the stadium, when Brive defeated the Leicester Tigers 28–9 in front of 41,664 spectators.

The stadium was the regular venue for the WRU Challenge Cup final from the competition’s inception in 1972 until its closure in 1997. It also hosted the Snelling Sevens tournament from 1968 to 1982, and again between 1992 and 1995.

==== Rugby World Cup ====
The National Stadium hosted the following matches during the 1991 Rugby World Cup:

Date	Competition	Home team		Away team		Attendance	Ref.
6 October 1991	1991 Rugby World Cup Pool 3	Wales	13	Western Samoa	16	45,000	
9 October 1991	1991 Rugby World Cup Pool 3	Wales	16	Argentina	7	35,000	
12 October 1991	1991 Rugby World Cup Pool 3	Wales	3	Australia	38	54,000	
30 October 1991	1991 Rugby World Cup Third-place play-off	New Zealand	13	Scotland	6	47,000	

=== Association football ===
On 31 May 1989, the Wales national football team played its first international at the stadium, against the West Germany national football team, in a World Cup qualifying match which ended goalless. It was also the first international football match in Great Britain attended exclusively by all-seater spectators.

=== Boxing ===
On 1 October 1993, around 25,000 spectators attended a World Boxing Council (WBC) Heavyweight title bout at the stadium between Lennox Lewis and Frank Bruno. It was the first time that two British-born boxers had contested the world heavyweight title. Lewis defeated Bruno by technical knockout in the seventh round, in what was described as the "Battle of Britain".

=== Greyhound racing ===
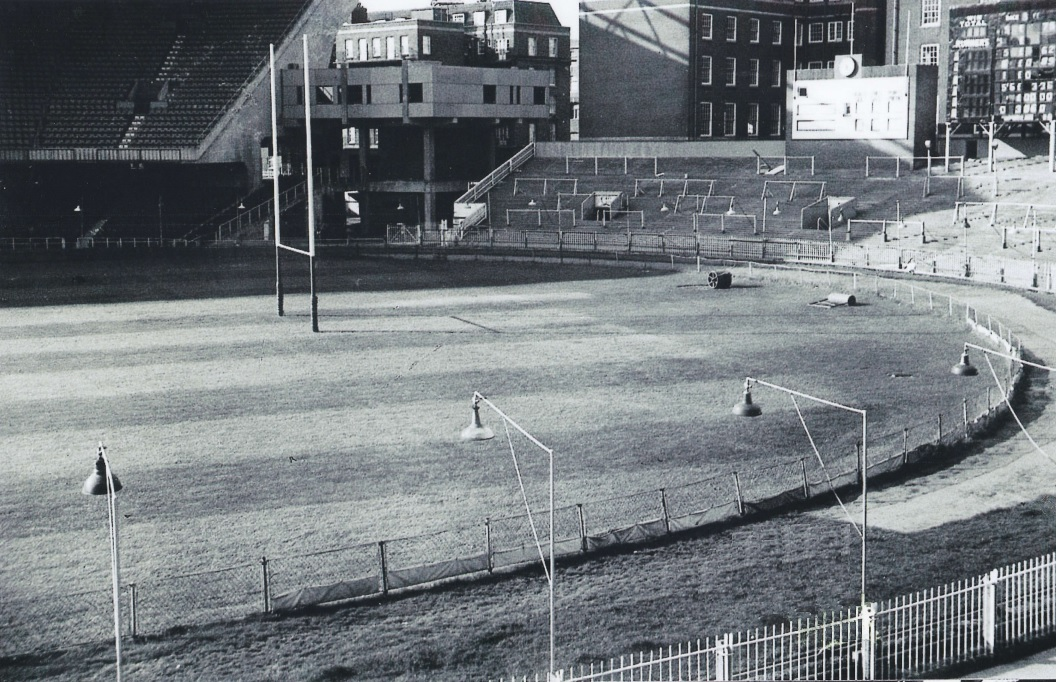
The greyhound track

Cardiff Greyhounds operated greyhound racing at the National Stadium from 1967 to 1977.

== Singing tradition ==
The National Stadium was known primarily as a venue for massed voices singing hymns such as "Cwm Rhondda", "Calon Lân", "Men of Harlech" and "Hen Wlad Fy Nhadau" ("Land of My Fathers", the national anthem of Wales). The atmosphere, including the collective singing of the crowd, was often regarded as providing the home nation with a psychological advantage. This singing tradition was later carried forward to the Millennium Stadium.

== See also ==
- Sport in Cardiff

== Notes ==
Preceded by none	Heineken Cup final venue 1995–96; 1996–97	Succeeded by Parc Lescure; Bordeaux
