= Chanel College, Moamoa =

Chanel College

Location
- Moamoa, Samoa; Samoa; 13.8700°S 171.7867°W

Information
- School type: Private, with some government subsidies, High school
- Motto: "Taofi Mau le Faatuatua" ("Cling Fast to the Faith")
- Denomination: Catholic, but open to all students
- Patron saint: St. Peter Chanel
- Status: Open
- Authority: Catholic Education (Samoa Diocese)
- Principal: Fr. 'Ekuasi Manu SM
- Grades: 9-13
- Colors: Blue and White
- Website: www.chanelcollege.org

Chanel College is a Catholic co-educational college in Moamoa, Samoa. It is near the top of Mount Vaea, at the end of Moamoa Road, which leads directly from Apia. The college has been staffed by a combination of Marist Fathers, Salasian sisters, volunteer organizations and regular employees.

== History ==
Founded in 1962 by the Marist Fathers, it was originally a boys-only boarding school (with special permission for non-boarders) that later became co-educational. The first principal was Father Bernard Doherty. The first head prefect was Lino Samoa, who later received from his family his chiefly title of "Taupa'u".

Enrollment numbers (in 2008) exceeded 400 students.

== Allegation of Abuse ==
A priest who taught for a year (1975) at Chanel College is alleged to have been a pedophile while teaching at Marist schools in New Zealand. However, there exists no credible report of sexual abuse allegation against him while he was at Chanel College.

- Father Francis A Durning, SM, MA. In 2009, the Society of Mary (Marists) in New Zealand accepted a complaint that one of its priests, Francis Durning, had sexually abused children. He was mentioned in the NZ Royal Commission of Inquiry into Abuse in Care hearings in Nov. 2020.
