= Rugby union at the 1979 South Pacific Games =

- Venue: National Stadium, Suva
- Dates: 30 August - September
- Nations: 8

Rugby union at the 1979 South Pacific Games was held in Fiji at the newly renovated National Stadium in Suva, with eight men's teams competing. Tonga beat the host nation Fiji by 6–3 in the final to win the gold medal and finish the tournament undefeated. New Caledonia defeated Western Samoa by 9–8 in the third place match to win the bronze medal.

== Medal summary ==
Event	Gold	Silver	Bronze
Men's rugby 15s	Tonga	Fiji	New Caledonia

== Men's tournament ==
=== Standings ===
Competition tables after the group stage:

Group 1
Team	Pld	W	D	L	Pts
Fiji	3	3	0	0	6
New Caledonia	3	2	0	1	4
Papua New Guinea	3	1	0	2	2
Wallis and Futuna	3	0	0	0	0
Group 2
Team	Pld	W	D	L	Pts
Tonga	3	3	0	0	6
Western Samoa	3	2	0	1	4
Solomon Islands	3	1	0	2	2
Tahiti	3	0	0	0	0

=== Group A matches ===
Group A	30 August 1979	Fiji	86–0	Papua New Guinea	National Stadium, Suva

Group A	3 September 1979	*Fiji	60–3	New Caledonia	National Stadium, Suva

Group A	September 1979	*Fiji	84–8	Wallis and Futuna	National Stadium, Suva

Group A	September 1979	New Caledonia	17–8	Papua New Guinea	National Stadium, Suva

Group A	September 1979	New Caledonia	def	Wallis and Futuna	National Stadium, Suva

Group A	September 1979	Papua New Guinea	23–5	Wallis and Futuna	National Stadium, Suva

* denotes team did not award caps for the match.

=== Group B matches ===
Group B	September 1979	Western Samoa	10–18	Tonga	National Stadium, Suva

Group B	September 1979	Solomon Islands	3–92	Tonga*	National Stadium, Suva

Group B	September 1979	Solomon Islands	35–3	Tahiti	National Stadium, Suva

Group B	September 1979	Western Samoa	def	Tahiti	National Stadium, Suva

Group B	September 1979	Tahiti	0–74	Tonga*	National Stadium, Suva

Group B	September 1979	Western Samoa	def	Solomon Islands	National Stadium, Suva

* denotes team did not award caps for the match.

=== Play-offs ===
Semifinal	September 1979	Fiji	16–13	Western Samoa	National Stadium, Suva

Semifinal	September 1979	New Caledonia	3–58	Tonga	National Stadium, Suva

3rd-place	September 1979	New Caledonia	9–8	Western Samoa	National Stadium, Suva

Final	September 1979	Fiji	3–6	Tonga	National Stadium, Suva

== See also ==
- Rugby union at the Pacific Games
