= 1991 Rugby World Cup qualifying =

Rugby qualifying competition

Tournament details
- Dates: 1987 – 1991
- No. of nations: 33

For the 1991 Rugby World Cup, 16 nations participated in the finals tournament, half of which came through qualifying matches, and the other were granted automatic entry as they were quarter-finalists at the 1987 Rugby World Cup. The 25 teams taking part in regional qualifiers together with the 8 teams which qualified automatically brings to 33 the total number of teams participating in the 1991 Rugby World Cup.

== Qualified teams ==
- Africa
  - Zimbabwe (Africa 1)
- Europe
  - England (automatic qualifier)
  - France (automatic qualifier)
  - Ireland (automatic qualifier)
  - Italy (Europe 1)
  - Romania (Europe 2)
  - Scotland (automatic qualifier)
  - Wales (automatic qualifier)
- Americas
  - Argentina (Americas 2)
  - Canada (Americas 1)
  - United States (Americas 3)
- Oceania and Asia
  - Australia (automatic qualifier)
  - Fiji (automatic qualifier)
  - Japan (Oceania/Asia 2)
  - New Zealand (automatic qualifier)
  - Western Samoa (Oceania/Asia 1)

== Automatic qualifiers ==
The five tournament hosts, as well as all quarter-finalists from the previous (1987) Rugby World Cup, automatically qualified for the final tournament.

- England (quarter-finalist and host)
- Fiji (quarter-finalist)
- Ireland (quarter-finalist and host)
- Scotland (quarter-finalist and host)
- Australia (semi-finalist)
- Wales (semi-finalist and host)
- France (finalist and host)
- New Zealand (champions)

== Regional qualifiers ==
=== Africa ===
- Zimbabwe (Africa 1)

=== Europe ===
- Italy (Europe 1)
- Romania (Europe 2)

=== Asia and Oceania ===
In qualification for the 1991 Rugby World Cup, Asia and Oceania were combined. The qualifying round-robin tournament was played in Japan in April 1990. The top two teams (Western Samoa and Japan) qualified for the finals and were allocated to Pool 3 and Pool 2, respectively.

- Western Samoa (Asia 1)
- Japan (Asia 2)

==== Standings ====
Team	Played	Won	Drawn	Lost	For	Against	Difference	Points
Western Samoa	3	3	0	0	123	21	+102	9
Japan	3	2	0	1	65	63	+2	7
Tonga	3	1	0	2	64	62	+2	5
South Korea	3	0	0	3	39	145	−106	3

==== Results ====
8 April 1990

Japan	28–16	Tonga

Prince Chichibu Memorial Rugby Ground, Tokyo

8 April 1990

South Korea	7–74	Western Samoa

Prince Chichibu Memorial Rugby Ground, Tokyo

11 April 1990

Japan	26–10	South Korea

Prince Chichibu Memorial Rugby Ground, Tokyo

11 April 1990

Tonga	3–12	Western Samoa

Prince Chichibu Memorial Rugby Ground, Tokyo

15 April 1990

Japan	11–37	Western Samoa

Prince Chichibu Memorial Rugby Ground, Tokyo

15 April 1990

South Korea	22–45	Tonga

Prince Chichibu Memorial Rugby Ground, Tokyo

=== Americas ===
Three nations from the Americas competed in qualifying matches for the 1991 Rugby World Cup. Because the Americas region had three places at the 1991 Rugby World Cup, all three participating countries from the Americas—Argentina, Canada and the United States—qualified for the finals tournament, with the qualifying tournament deciding to which pool each team would be allocated at the finals.

- Canada (Americas 1)
- Argentina (Americas 2)
- United States (Americas 3)

==== Standings ====
Team	Played	Won	Drawn	Lost	For	Against	Difference	Points
Canada	4	3	0	1	67	38	+29	10
Argentina	4	2	0	2	57	46	+11	8
United States	4	1	0	3	29	69	–40	6

==== Results ====
Date	Home	Score	Away	Venue
23 September 1989	Canada	21–3	United States	Varsity Stadium, Toronto
8 November 1989	Argentina	23–6	United States	José Amalfitani Stadium, Buenos Aires
30 March 1990	Canada	15–6	Argentina	Burnaby Lake Sports Complex, Vancouver
7 April 1990	United States	6–13	Argentina	Santa Barbara, United States
9 June 1990	United States	14–12	Canada	Chief Stealth, Seattle
16 June 1990	Argentina	15–19	Canada	José Amalfitani Stadium, Buenos Aires

Canada, Argentina and the United States qualified for the 1991 Rugby World Cup, with Canada allocated to Pool 4, Argentina to Pool 3 and the United States to Pool 2.

== See also ==
- Africa qualification
- European qualification
- Americas qualification
- Asia and Oceania qualification
