= Daryl Williams (rugby union) =

- Born: 30 September 1964 (age 62) Auckland, New Zealand
- Height: 6 ft 4 in (1.93 m)
- Weight: 201 lb (91 kg)
- School: Waitākere College

Rugby union career
- Position: Lock
Amateur team(s)
Years	Team	Apps	(Points)
1985–1986	Otahuhu		
1988–1989	Takapuna		
1996	Feilding		
Senior career
Years	Team	Apps	(Points)
1995	US Colomiers		
Provincial / State sides
Years	Team	Apps	(Points)
1985–1986	Auckland B	3	(0)
1988–1989	North Harbour	12	(4)
1996	Manawatu	7	(0)
Super Rugby
Years	Team	Apps	(Points)
1996	Wellington Hurricanes	2	(0)
International career
Years	Team	Apps	(Points)
1985	New Zealand Colts	4	(0)
1987	Maori All Blacks	1	(0)
1988–1995	Samoa	5	(0)

Daryl Richard Williams (born in Auckland, 30 September 1964) is a New Zealand-born Samoan rugby union player. He played as a lock.

He attended High School at Waitākere College.

== Career ==
Williams was selected in the New Zealand Maori side, but did not play as he was subsequently found to be ineligible. He was also a New Zealand Colts trialist in 1985.

His first international cap was against Ireland, at Lansdowne Road, on 29 October 1989. Although not being part of the 1991 Rugby World Cup roster, he played in the 1995 Rugby World Cup, playing two matches.

After returning to New Zealand from a playing career in France he was a Hurricanes injury replacement player at the end of the 1996 season, he played the final two matches against the Chiefs and the Waratahs.

He played for the Feilding club and played seven matches for Manawatu in 1996.
