= Daniel Farani =

- Full name: Daniel Seleni Farani
- Born: 14 March 1977 (age 49) Wellington, New Zealand
- Height: 6 ft 5 in (196 cm)
- Weight: 264 lb (120 kg)

Rugby union career
- Position: Back-row
International career
Years	Team	Apps	(Points)
2005–06	Samoa	9	(15)

Daniel Seleni Farani (born 14 March 1977) is a Samoan former rugby union international.

== Rugby career ==
Born in Wellington, Farani was a back-row forward, based in Europe for the majority of his career. He played his early rugby at Petone and made provincial appearances with Wellington in the late 1990s, before linking up with Stourbridge in 2001. After his sole season in Stourbridge, Farani had a season with Italian club Viadana, then had stints with the Cornish Pirates and Coventry. He competed for Durban-based team Sharks in the 2006 Super 14 season, then played in France until 2012, for SC Albi and RC Nîmes.

=== International ===
Farani played Test rugby for Samoa in 2005 and 2006, gaining nine caps.

== See also ==
- List of Samoa national rugby union players
