= Filipo Saena =

Samoa international rugby union player & coach

- Born: Filipo David Saena; June 6, 1966 (age 60) Apia, Samoa
- Height: 178 cm (5 ft 10 in)
- Weight: 79 kg (174 lb)

Rugby union career
- Position: Flyhalf
Amateur team(s)
| Years | Team | Apps | (Points) |
| 1992 | Te Atatu | | |
Senior career
| Years | Team | Apps | (Points) |
| 1988-1991 | Moata'a | | |
Provincial / State sides
| Years | Team | Apps | (Points) |
| 1992 | Auckland | 2 | (11) |
International career
| Years | Team | Apps | (Points) |
| 1988-1993 | Samoa | 17 | (14) |
Coaching career
- Years: Team
- 2001: Samoa

Fainu'ulelei Filipo David Saena (born 6 June 1966 in Apia) is a Samoan former rugby union player. He plays as a fly-half.

== Career ==
Saena first played for Western Samoa in a test match against Tonga at Apia, on May 28, 1988. He was part of the 1991 Rugby World Cup roster. His last match for the Manu Samoa was against Fiji at Apia on June 5, 1993.
