= Tauveve Ugapo =

Samoan rugby union player

- Born: circa 1965 (age 60–61) Samoa
- Height: 178 cm (5 ft 10 in)
- Weight: 72 kg (159 lb)

Rugby union career
- Position: Wing
Senior career
Years	Team	Apps	(Points)
- Vaimoso
International career
Years	Team	Apps	(Points)
1988-1989	Samoa	7	(0)

Tauveve Ugapo, sometimes misspelled as "Tauvere Ugapo" or Taueve Ugapo, (born circa 1965) is a former Samoan rugby union player who played as wing. He also took part at the 1983 South Pacific Games as a track and field athlete, where he competed in long jump and 400 metres hurdles.

== Career ==
His first international cap for Samoa was during the match against Tonga, in Apia, on 28 May 1988. He was one of the members of the Samoan squad who toured Wales and Britain in 1988. His last international cap was against Belgium, in Brussels, on 3 October 1989.
