= Vincent Fepulea'i =

- Born: c. 1965 (age 60–61) Samoa
- Height: 180 cm (5 ft 11 in)
- Weight: 76 kg (168 lb)

Rugby union career
- Position: Scrum-half
Senior career
Years	Team	Apps	(Points)
- Marist St. Joseph
International career
Years	Team	Apps	(Points)
1988-1989	Samoa	4	(0)

Faleomavaega Vincent Fepulea'i (born c. 1965) is a Samoan former rugby union player. He played as a scrum-half. Currently, as of 2015 he is Samoa Rugby Union CEO.

== Career ==
His first cap for the Manu Samoa was against Wales, at Cardiff, on November 12, 1988 and his last international cap was against Romania, at Bucharest, on October 14, 1989.
