= Rugby union at the 1963 South Pacific Games =

- Venue: National Stadium, Suva
- Dates: 30 August - 7 September
- Nations: 3

Rugby union at the 1963 South Pacific Games was played as a double round-robin with 3 men's teams competing. No finals were played and a complete set of gold, silver and bronze medals were awarded to the teams as per their finishing positions. Fiji was unbeaten in the tournament and were presented with their gold medals by the Governor of Fiji.

== Medal summary ==
Event	Gold	Silver	Bronze
Men's rugby 15s	Fiji	Tonga	Western Samoa

== Men's tournament ==
=== Standings ===
Final standings after the round robin tournament:

Team	Pld	W	D	L	PF	PA	PD	Pts
Fiji	4	4	0	0	104	23	+81	8
Tonga	4	2	0	2	59	44	+15	4
Western Samoa	4	0	0	4	20	116	-96	0

=== Matches ===
30 August 1963

Fiji	29–6	Western Samoa

National Stadium, Suva

31 August 1963

Fiji	8–5	Tonga

National Stadium, Suva

3 September 1963

Western Samoa	5–16	Tonga

National Stadium, Suva

5 September 1963

Fiji	42–3	Western Samoa

National Stadium, Suva

6 September 1963

Western Samoa	6–29	Tonga

National Stadium, Suva

7 September 1963

Fiji	25–9	Tonga

National Stadium, Suva

== See also ==
- Rugby union at the Pacific Games
