= Saini Lemamea =

Samoan rugby union player (1964–2021)

- Born: July 14, 1964 Apia, Samoa
- Died: January 2021 (aged 56)

Rugby union career
- Position: Lock
Senior career
Years	Team	Apps	(Points)
1988-19??	Lefaga		
19??-1995	SCOPA		
International career
Years	Team	Apps	(Points)
1988-1995	Samoa	13	(4)

Su'a Saini Lemamea (14 July 1964 – January 2021) was a Samoan rugby union player. He played as a lock. He was nicknamed as "Bushman" (which was given by the then-technical advisor of the Samoa national team Barry “Tizza” Taylor (who struggled with pronounce his full name), due to his long hair.

== Career ==
Lemamea was born in Apia. His first international cap was during a match against Ireland, at Lansdowne Road, on 29 October 1989. Although he was not present in the 1991 Rugby World Cup roster, he took part at the 1995 Rugby World Cup, playing two matches. His last international cap was during a match against Tonga, at Nuku'alofa, on 8 July 1995.
