= Tuilagi =

Tuilagi is a surname notably shared by a set of Samoan rugby-playing brothers and their offspring. The five oldest have all represented Samoa at international level in a World Cup while the youngest, Manu chose to represent England, also reaching a World Cup and playing for the British and Irish Lions in 2013. Posolo Tuilagi, son of Henry Tuilagi, represents France and received his first cap in 2024.

- Tuilagi Vavae (born 1945)
  - Freddie Tuilagi (born 1971) (Samoa 17 caps)
    - Fred Tuilagi (born 1997)
  - Henry Tuilagi (born 1976) (Samoa 10 caps)
    - Posolo Tuilagi (born 2004) (France 5 caps)
  - Alesana Tuilagi (born 1981) (Samoa 37 caps)
  - Anitelea Tuilagi (born 1986) (Samoa 17 caps)
  - Sanele Vavae Tuilagi (born 1988) (Samoa 9 caps)
  - Manu Tuilagi (born 1991) (England 60 caps)

The brothers also have a seventh sibling, born Olotuli, who is fa'afafine and goes by the name Julie Tuilagi.
