= Tuilagi Vavae =

Samoan politician (1945–2020)

Deputy Speaker of the Legislative Assembly of Samoa
- In office 1988–1991
- Preceded by: Leaupepe Toleafoa Faafisi

Member of the Samoa Parliament for Fa'asaleleaga No. 2
- In office 26 February 1988 – April 1991
- Preceded by: Asi Eikeni
- Succeeded by: Pa'u Sale'aula Faleatua

Personal details
- Born: 2 November 1945 Tuasivi, Samoa
- Died: 8 November 2020 (aged 75)
- Party: Human Rights Protection Party

Namulau'ulu Lauaki Tuilagi Vavae Leo II (2 November 1945 – 8 November 2020) was a Samoan politician and former Deputy Speaker of the Legislative Assembly of Samoa. He was a member of the Human Rights Protection Party.

Namulau'ulu was born in Tuasivi. He was a heavyweight boxing champion. After travelling to Australia and Fiji he worked as a Deputy Registrar of the Land and Titles Court of Samoa for 15 years, before returning to Fatausi in 1986 to become village high chief.

He was elected to the Legislative Assembly of Samoa at the 1988 election and served as Deputy Speaker. He lost his seat at the 1991 election.

== Family ==
Namulau'ulu was the father of rugby players Freddie Tuilagi, Henry Tuilagi, Alesana Tuilagi, Anitelea Tuilagi, Vavae Tuilagi and Manu Tuilagi.
