= Posolo Tuilagi =

French rugby union player (born 2004)

- Born: 28 July 2004 (age 22) Samoa
- Height: 1.94 m (6 ft 4 1/2 in)
- Weight: 149 kg (23 st 6 lb; 328 lb)
- Notable relative(s): Henry Tuilagi (father); Henry Tuilagi Jr. (older brother); Freddie Tuilagi (uncle); Alesana Tuilagi (uncle); Anitelea Tuilagi (uncle); Sanele Vavae Tuilagi (uncle); Manu Tuilagi (uncle)

Rugby union career
- Position: Lock
- Current team: Perpignan
Youth career
- 2010–2022: Perpignan
Senior career
| Years | Team | Apps | (Points) |
| 2022– | Perpignan | 43 | (20) |
- Correct as of 4 March 2025
International career
| Years | Team | Apps | (Points) |
| 2023–2024 | France U20 | 7 | (15) |
| 2024– | France | 5 | (0) |
- Correct as of 13 July 2024

Posolo Tuilagi (born 28 July 2004) is a professional rugby union player, who plays as a lock for Top 14 club Perpignan. Born in Samoa, he qualified for France through residency, having lived in Pyrénées-Orientales since the age of 3, and has played for the France national under-20 team.

He is the son of former Samoa international and Perpignan player Henry Tuilagi, as well as the brother of Club Athlétique Périgueux Dordogne player Henry Tuilagi Jr. He is the nephew of England player Manu Tuilagi and former Samoa internationals Freddie, Alesana, Anitelea and Sanele Vavae Tuilagi.

== Early life ==
Posolo Tuilagi was born on 28 July 2004 in Samoa before moving to England where his father, Henry, then played for Leicester Tigers. He arrived in Perpignan, France at the age of three with his parents when Henry signed for the city's club. Posolo grew up and was educated – he graduated from high school in 2023 – in the Perpignan area where his father settled after his professional career. He started playing rugby for French Catalonia's leading club in 2010.

== Club career ==
Having played in Perpignan youth teams, he made his professional debut for the Blood and Golds on 17 September 2022 in a home loss against La Rochelle.

== International career ==
After a few caps for the France national under-18 team, Tuilagi made his debut for France U20 on 10 March 2023 in the Six Nations Under 20s Championship match against England. A few months later, he was named in the France U20 squad for the World Rugby U20 Championship and scored a brace in a 35–14 win over New Zealand on 29 June 2023. On February 2, 2024, Posolo made his first appearance for the French Men's Senior Team, coming off the bench in the second half of France's opening game against Ireland.

== Personal life ==
Tuilagi's father is former Samoa international and Perpignan player Henry Tuilagi. He is the nephew of England centre Manu Tuilagi and former Samoa internationals Freddie, Alesana, Anitelea and Sanele Vavae Tuilagi. His brother, Henry Tuilagi Jr. is also a professional rugby union player who currently plays in the Nationale, the third tier of club competition in France.

== Honours ==
France U20

- World Rugby Under 20 Championship
  - (gold) Champion (1): 2023
- Six Nations Under 20s Championship
  - (silver) Runner-up (1): 2023
