= Fred Tuilagi =

English rugby union player (born 1997)

- Born: Frederick Tuialgi; 9 June 1997 (age 29) Halifax, England
- Height: 6 ft 3 in (191 cm)
- Weight: 18 st 12 lb (264 lb; 120 kg)
- Notable relative(s): Freddie Tuilagi (father), Brian Tuilagi (brother), Henry Tuilagi, Alesana Tuilagi, Anitelea Tuilagi and Manu Tuilagi (all uncles)

Rugby union career
- Position: Number 8
- Current team: Bedford Blues
Youth career
- 20??-2015: Hinckley RFC
Senior career
Years	Team	Apps	(Points)
2015–2016	South Leicester RFC	4	(5)
2016–2017	Coventry	11	(5)
2017–2018	Loughborough Students	2	(0)
2016–2019	Leicester Tigers	8	(5)
2019–2020	Rugby Colorno	8	(20)
2020–2021	London Scottish	0	(0)
2021–2022	Chinnor	27	(40)
2022–2024	AS Bédarrides	38	(40)
2024–	Bedford Blues	14	(15)
2015–	Total	113	(130)
- Correct as of 12 March 2025
International career
Years	Team	Apps	(Points)
2024–	Samoa	0	(0)
- Correct as of 17 June 2025

Fred Tuilagi (born 9 June 1997) is a rugby union player for Bedford Blues in the English RFU Championship. He previously played for AS Bédarrides and Leicester Tigers in Premiership Rugby. Tuilagi is the son of former Leicester and St Helens winger Freddie Tuilagi and is the second generation of the Tuilagi family to play professional rugby. He primarily plays at Number 8 but can play at Blindside flanker if required.

He is eligible for both England and Samoa but has played for neither team at any level. He was named in the Samoa squad for the 2024 July International Tests.

== Career ==
=== Youth ===
As a youth he played for Hinckley RFC, where his uncle Manu played too, and was a prop originally before being switched to the backrow when he came through the Tigers Academy. His older brother, Brian, was an academy graduate but moved to the Saracens Development team and now plays for US Dax. Tuilagi originally played prop before moving to back row in his later teens.

=== Leicester ===
He made his senior debut for the Leicester Tigers on 4 November 2016 when he came on as a substitute in the 20-21 victory over Bath at the Recreation Ground, becoming the 6th Tuilagi to play for the Tigers at senior level following dad Freddie and uncles Henry, Anitelea, Alesana and current Sale, Lions and England centre Manu.

Fred first made prominence after featuring for the Tigers in the 2016 Singha Premiership Rugby 7s Series where he was yellow carded in the 1st minute against Worcester and made his official debut later that year, although that was his single appearance that season, being used in the A League and being loaned to Coventry R.F.C. He was on his way out but new head coach Matt O'Connor convinced him to stay, stating that he has the potential to be as devastating as his uncle Henry. After a prominent appearance in preseason, Tuilagi was given his 1st senior start and Welford Road debut against Gloucester Rugby in the Anglo-Welsh Cup and went to make a further 3 more appearances in the competition.

Ahead of the 2018/19 season, Fred was promoted to the senior squad, joining his uncle Manu. He made 8 appearances so far, all of which were in the Premiership Rugby Cup. In the Derby Round fixture, Tuilagi scored his first senior try for the club and also provided a try-assist for fly-half Joe Ford in a 47-20 defeat for the Tigers. On 15 May 2019 he was announced as one of the players to leave Leicester following the end of the 2018-19 Premiership Rugby season.

=== Colorno ===
On 23 July 2019 Tuilagi was announced as a signing for newly promoted Rugby Colorno in Italy's Top 12.

=== London Scottish ===
In June 2020, London Scottish announced the signing of Tuilagi along with his brother Brian.
