= Rugby union in American Samoa =

- Country: American Samoa
- Governing body: American Samoa Rugby Union
- National team: American Samoa
- First played: 1920s
- Registered players: 394

National competitions
- Rugby World Cup; Rugby World Cup Sevens; IRB Sevens World Series

Rugby union in American Samoa is a growing sport.

== Governing body ==
The governing body is the American Samoa Rugby Union (ASRU), which is a full member of both the Federation of Oceania Rugby Unions (FORU) and the International Rugby Board (IRB).

== History ==
Rugby union has been played in American Samoa since at least 1924, but the national development of the game has been overshadowed by the popularity of American football since the 1970s. The ASRU was only established in 1990, and did not become fully affiliated to the IRB until 2012.

As such, unlike neighbouring Samoa, American Samoa has had limited international rugby competition. While Samoa, whose team calls itself "Manu Samoa" meaning the Samoan team, has reached the Rugby World Cup on a number of occasions, most of American Samoa's matches have been played at the South Pacific Games.

== National team (15s) ==
American Samoa played some international rugby matches before being affiliated to IRB, including winning the rugby 15's silver medal at the 1991 South Pacific Games in Port Moresby. The American Samoan team is known as the "Talavalu"—named after a traditional ironwood war club with eight carved diamond-shaped teeth on one edge.

== National team (7s) ==
Since 2010, the ASRU has focused more of its attention toward the seven-a-side form of the game. American Samoa competed at the Pacific Games Rugby 7s in 2011, and the Oceania Rugby 7s in 2011 and 2012.

== See also ==
- Rugby union in Samoa
