= Safotulafai =

- Village District
- Interactive map of Safotulafai
- Location within American Samoa Location within Pacific Ocean
- Coordinates: 13°40′54″S 172°11′6″W
- Country: Samoa
- District: Fa'asaleleaga
- Time zone: -11

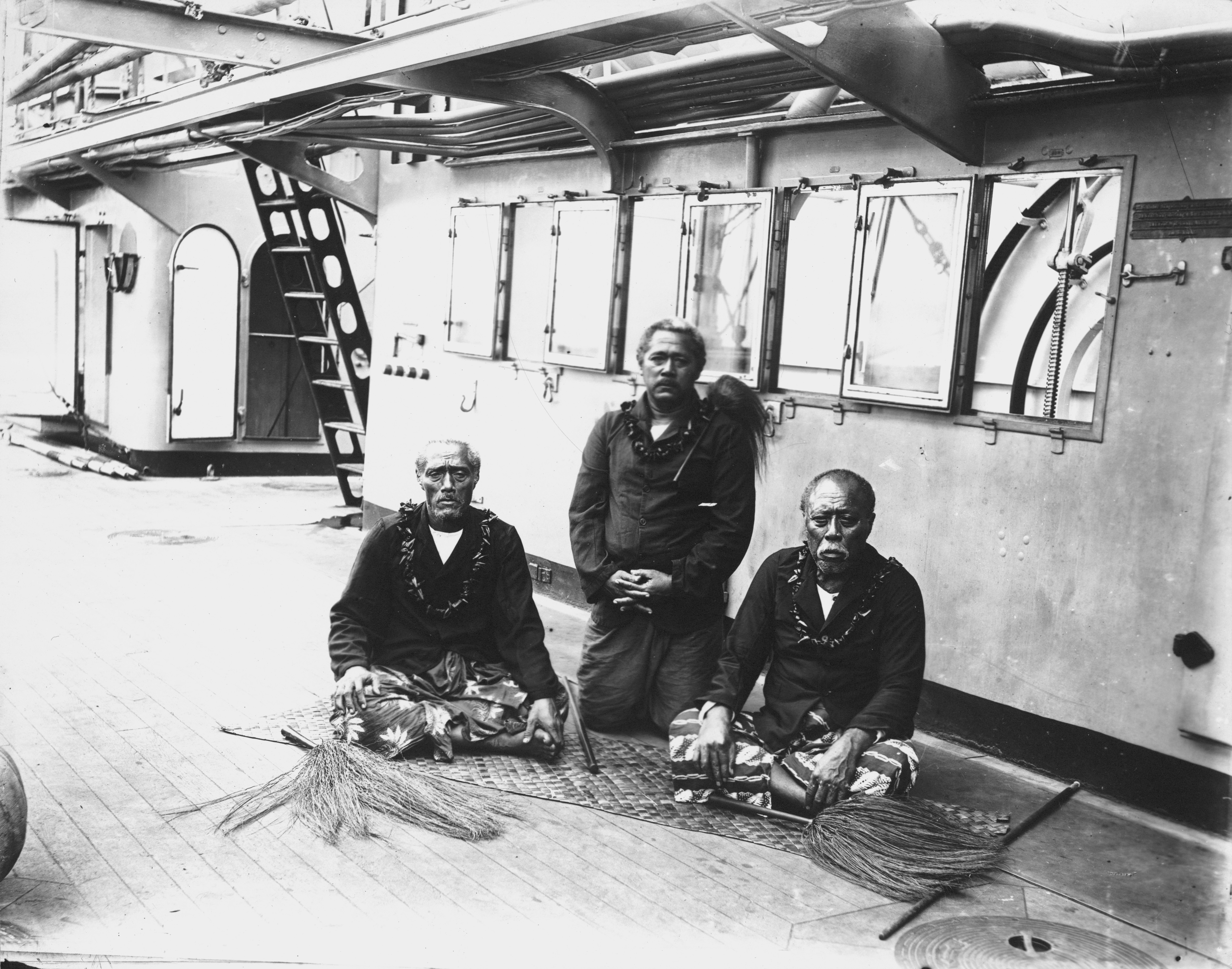
Lauaki Namulauulu Mamoe (left) and two matai chiefs aboard the German warship taking them to exile in Saipan, 1909. All three bear the symbols of orator status – the fue (fly whisk made of organic sennit rope with a wooden handle).

Safotulafai is a traditional village at the east end of Savai'i island with historical and political significance in Samoa's history. It is the traditional center of the island of Savaii, now became the center of Fa'asaleleaga political district.

Safotulafai is the original 'Pule', which is why Savaii is called 'Pule' of Samoa. Years later, Safotulafai chose to divide the 'Pule' into six while reserving the right to be the 'Matua' of 'Pule'. Today, Safotulafai remains to be one of the traditional 'Pule' (customary authority) ruling districts of Savai'i. Chief (matai) council meetings are held at Fuifatu malae. Safotulafai is the village name with its sub-villages: Tuasivi, Fogapoa, Fatausi, Fuifatu, Fusi, and Eveeve.

== History ==
In the early 1900s, during the time when the country was called German Samoa (1900 - 1914), this is also the place which saw the beginnings of the Mau, Samoa's independence movement. This initial resistance movement against German colonial rule was called the Mau a Pule. It was led by well known orator Lauaki Namulauulu Mamoe from Satotulafai. In 1909, Lauaki and other Mau a Pule supporters, including his younger brother who was also the holder of the 'Namulauulu' family chief title, bestowed by Namulauulu Lauaki at Falelatai, were trialed and exiled to Saipan by German Governor Wilhelm Solf. Some of the Mau a Pule died in exile.

By the late 1920s, the Mau movement had gathered widespread national support under the New Zealand administration which followed from colonial rule by Germany.

In 1962, the country became the first Pacific nation to gain political independence, under its former name Western Samoa which formally returned to its pre-occupation name Samoa in 1997.

== Matai chief titles ==
Safotulafai has strong traditional connections with Saleaula on the central north coast, through the paramount chiefly title (matai) of Letufuga. Safotulafai is always consulted by the village of Malie (Tuamasaga district) in conjunction with Manono Island (Aiga-i-le-Tai district), in the election of Malietoa title-holders.

== See also ==
- Samoan language
- History of Samoa
- Politics of Samoa
