= Rugby union at the 1971 South Pacific Games =

- Venue: Papeete, Tahiti
- Dates: August - September
- Nations: 5

Rugby union at the 1971 South Pacific Games was held at Papeete in Tahiti with five men's teams competing. Western Samoa won the gold medal and were undefeated in the tournament.

== Medal summary ==
| Event | Gold | Silver | Bronze |
|---|---|---|---|
| Men's rugby 15s | Western Samoa | Cook Islands | Tahiti |

== Men's tournament ==
=== Standings ===
Competition tables after the group stage:

Group 1
| Team | Pld | W | D | L | PF | PA | PD | Pts |
| Wallis and Futuna | 1 | 1 | 0 | 0 | 3 | 0 | +3 | 2 |
| Tahiti | 1 | 0 | 0 | 1 | 0 | 3 | −3 | 0 |
Group 2
| Team | Pld | W | D | L | PF | PA | PD | Pts |
| Western Samoa | 2 | 2 | 0 | 0 | 52 | 24 | +28 | 4 |
| Cook Islands | 2 | 1 | 0 | 1 | 45 | 32 | +13 | 2 |
| New Caledonia | 2 | 0 | 0 | 2 | 14 | 55 | -41 | 0 |

=== Group matches ===
| Group A | August 1971 | Tahiti | 0–3 | Wallis and Futuna | Papeete, Tahiti |

| Group B | August 1971 | Cook Islands | 27–8 | New Caledonia | Papeete, Tahiti |

| Group B | August 1971 | Cook Islands | 18–24 | Western Samoa | Papeete, Tahiti |

| Group B | August 1971 | Western Samoa | 28-6 | New Caledonia | Papeete, Tahiti |

=== Play-offs ===
| Semifinal | September 1971 | Tahiti | 11–33 | Western Samoa | Papeete, Tahiti |

| Semifinal | September 1971 | Cook Islands | 29–18 | Wallis and Futuna | Papeete, Tahiti |

| 3rd-place | September 1971 | Tahiti | 14–0 | Wallis and Futuna | Papeete, Tahiti |

| Final | September 1971 | Cook Islands | 9–23 | Western Samoa | Papeete, Tahiti |

== See also ==
- Rugby union at the Pacific Games
