= Fatausi =

- Village
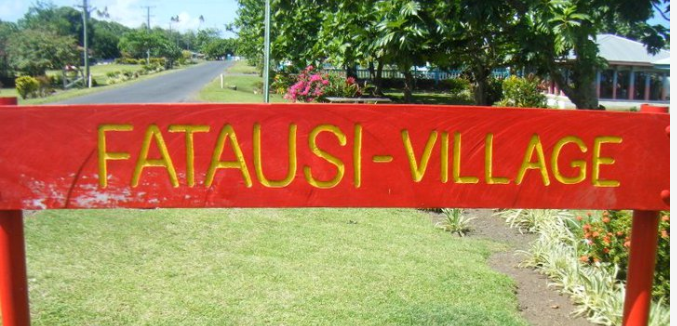
- The Fatausi sign at the south end of the village bordering Fusi
- Motto: Fa'avae ile Atua
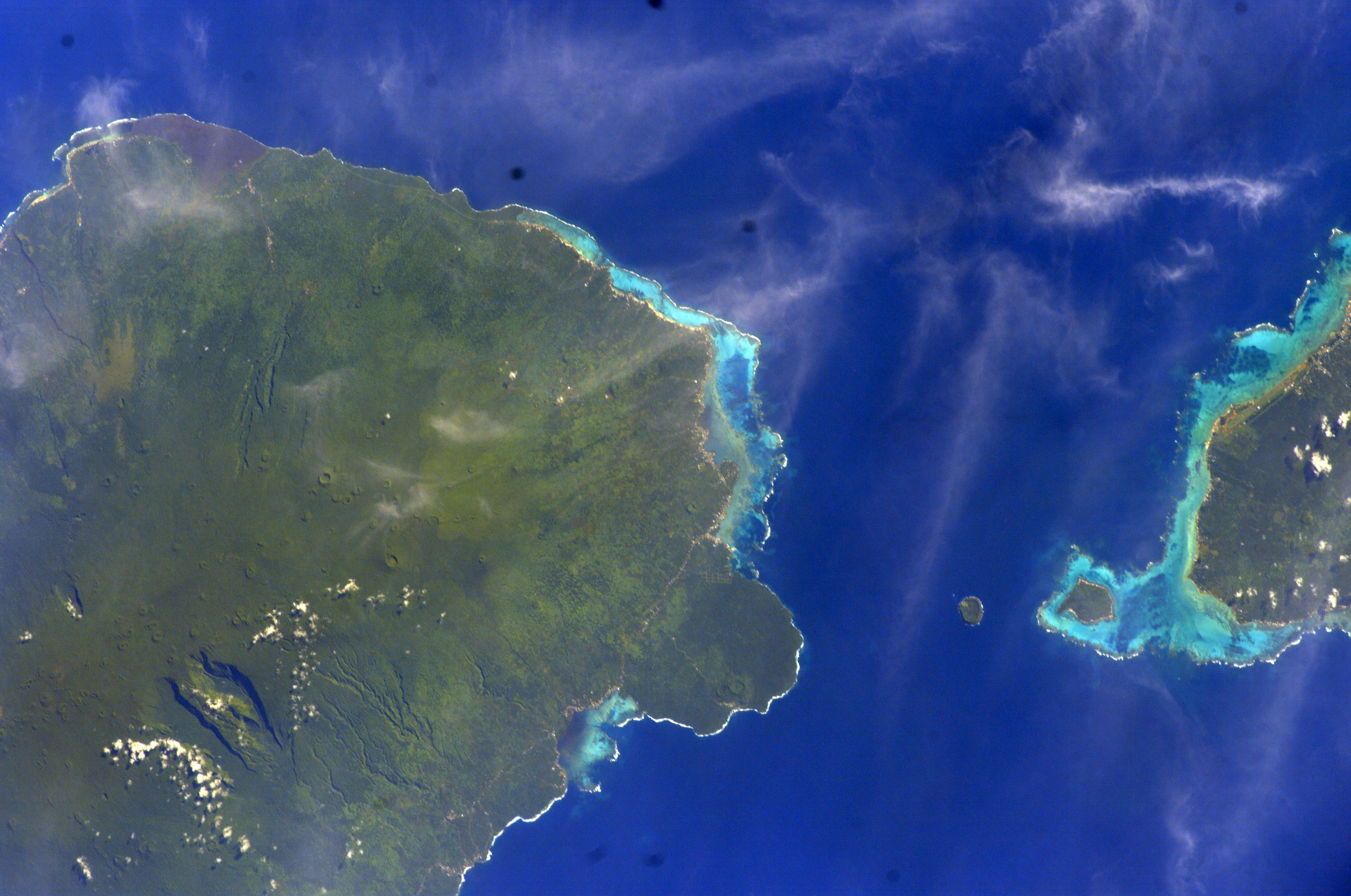
- Satellite image of eastern half of Savai'i island (left of photo) with tiny Apolima & Manono islands and the western tip of Upolu. (NASA photo, 2006)
- Coordinates: 13°50′S 171°45′W
- Country: Samoa
- District: Safotulafai
- Elevation: 2 m (6.6 ft)

Population (2016)
  - Total: 205
- Time zone: UTC+13 (SST)

Fatausi is a village on the island of Savai'i in Samoa. It is situated on the east coast of the island in the district of Fa'asaleleaga and the electoral district of Fa'asaleleaga 3. The population is 205.

This small village sits between the villages of Fogapoa to the north and the larger village of Fusi to the south. These three villages and the village of Tuasivi further north together form the traditional sub-district of Safotulafai. Tuilagi Letasi, a village orator, was part of the 'Mau a Pule' movement against German colonial rule, and was exiled along with Lauaki Namulauulu Mamoe in 1909.

Safotulafai is also the capital of the Fa'asaleleaga political district, a major Malietoa area.
