= Rugby union at the 1969 South Pacific Games =

- Venue: Port Moresby, Papua New Guinea
- Dates: 16 - 23 August
- Nations: 5

Rugby union at the 1969 South Pacific Games was hosted at Port Moresby, the capital of Papua New Guinea. Fiji were hot favourites in the tournament and delivered on that promise to comfortably win gold.

Hosts Papua New Guinea, New Caledonia, Solomon Islands and Wallis and Futuna also took part in the tournament.

== Medal summary ==
Event	Gold	Silver	Bronze	Ref
Men's rugby 15s	Fiji	Papua New Guinea	Solomon Islands	

== Men's tournament ==
Note: Records for this tournament may be incomplete.

=== Matches ===
16 August 1969	Fiji	84–8	Wallis and Futuna	Port Moresby

August 1969	Papua New Guinea	46–0	Wallis and Futuna	Port Moresby

18 August 1969	Papua New Guinea	0–79	Fiji	Port Moresby
		Report

August 1969	Papua New Guinea	23–5	Solomon Islands	Port Moresby

20 August 1969	Fiji	113–3	New Caledonia	Port Moresby
		Report

August 1969	Papua New Guinea	17–8	New Caledonia	Port Moresby

21 August 1969	Fiji	113–13	Solomon Islands	Port Moresby

22 August 1969	New Caledonia	12–11	Solomon Islands	Port Moresby

=== Final ===
23 August 1969	Fiji	88–3	Papua New Guinea	Port Moresby
		Report

== See also ==
- Rugby union at the Pacific Games

== Sources ==
- Cotton, Fran; Rhys, Chris, eds. (1984). The Book of Rugby Disasters & Bizarre Records. London: Century Publishing. ISBN 0-7126-0911-3.
