= Rugby union at the 1966 South Pacific Games =

- Venue: Nouméa, New Caledonia
- Dates: December
- Nations: 4

Rugby union at the 1966 South Pacific Games was played as a round-robin tournament with 4 men's teams competing. No finals were played and the teams finishing in the top three positions were awarded medals. Papua New Guinea, captained by Peter Emery, won the gold medal and were unbeaten in the tournament.

== Medal summary ==
Event	Gold	Silver	Bronze
Men's rugby 15s	Papua New Guinea	New Caledonia	New Hebrides

== Men's tournament ==
=== Standings ===
Final standings after the round robin tournament:

Team	Pld	W	D	L	PF	PA	PD	Pts
Papua New Guinea	3	3	0	0	135	8	127	6
New Caledonia	3	2	0	1	39	47	-8	4
New Hebrides	3	1	0	2	16	62	-46	2
Wallis and Futuna	3	0	0	3	11	84	-73	0

=== Matches ===
December 1966

New Caledonia	15–7	New Hebrides

Nouméa, New Caledonia

December 1966

New Caledonia	0–34	Papua New Guinea

Nouméa, New Caledonia

December 1966

New Caledonia	24–6	Wallis and Futuna

Nouméa, New Caledonia

December 1966

New Hebrides	3–47	Papua New Guinea

Nouméa, New Caledonia

December 1966

New Hebrides	6–0	Wallis and Futuna

Nouméa, New Caledonia

December 1966

Papua New Guinea	54–5	Wallis and Futuna

Nouméa, New Caledonia

== See also ==
- Rugby union at the Pacific Games
