= New Caledonia Rugby Committee =

Comité Régional de Rugby de Nouvelle Calédonie
- Sport: Rugby union
- Founded: 1960s (est.)
- Oceania Rugby affiliation: 2000
- Website: rugby.nc

The New Caledonia Rugby Committee (French: Comité de Rugby de Nouvelle Calédonie, —or officially: Comité Régional de Rugby de Nouvelle Calédonie) is a committee under the umbrella of the French Rugby Federation which is the governing body for rugby union within New Caledonia.

It is a full member of the Oceania Rugby, which is the governing body for rugby union in Oceania, but it is not affiliated with the International Rugby Board (IRB) in its own right.

== National teams ==
The New Caledonia 15-a-side team has competed at the South Pacific Games, winning a silver medal in 1966 and two gold medals in 1987 and 1995. More recently, the team has played for the FORU Oceania Cup. New Caledonia fields teams in 7's competitions as well as 15's. The national women's 7s team has also competed at the Pacific Games.

== See also ==
- Rugby union in New Caledonia
- New Caledonia national rugby union team
- New Caledonia national rugby union team (sevens)
- New Caledonia women's national rugby union team (sevens)
