= Rugby union in New Caledonia =

- Country: New Caledonia
- Governing body: French Rugby Federation; Comité Régional de Rugby de Nouvelle Calédonie
- National team: New Caledonia

Rugby union in New Caledonia is a minor but growing sport.

== Governing body ==
The Comité Régional de Rugby de Nouvelle Calédonie is a committee under the umbrella of the French Rugby Federation which is the governing body for rugby union within New Caledonia.

The committee is not affiliated to the IRB in its own right, but it is a full member of the Federation of Oceania Rugby Unions (FORU), which is the governing body for rugby in Oceania.

== History ==
Rugby union was first introduced into New Caledonia by the French, and has been played there for at least a century. New Caledonia is a French overseas collectivity, and this has proven a mixed blessing, as players have the prospect of "promotion" to French professionalism/semi-amateurism, but this also potentially weakens the New Caledonian system, removing players, and disallowing them to represent their own country.

Rugby Sevens has been a sport in the South Pacific Games since the late 1990s.

There is also a semi-formal league structure.

New Caledonia took part in a rugby sevens tournament in the Cook Islands in June, 2009.

== See also ==
- New Caledonia national rugby union team
- New Caledonia national rugby union team (sevens)
- New Caledonia women's national rugby union team (sevens)
- Rugby union in France
