= Rugby union at the 1991 South Pacific Games =

- Venue: Port Moresby, Papua New Guinea
- Dates: September
- Nations: 6

Rugby union at the 1991 South Pacific Games was held at Port Moresby, the capital of Papua New Guinea, during September 1991. In the absence of Fiji and Tonga from the tournament, Western Samoa won the gold medal.

== Medal summary ==
| Event | Gold | Silver | Bronze |
|---|---|---|---|
| Men's rugby 15s | Western Samoa | American Samoa | Solomon Islands |

== Teams ==
Competing teams were:

Pool A

- American Samoa
- Solomon Islands
- Papua New Guinea
- French Polynesia

Pool B

- Western Samoa
- Vanuatu

Note: Records for this tournament are incomplete.

== Matches ==
=== Pool A ===
September 1991

| Papua New Guinea | 9–7 | American Samoa |

Port Moresby, PNG

September 1991

| Solomon Islands | def. | French Polynesia |

Port Moresby, PNG

September 1991

| American Samoa | def. | Solomon Islands |

Port Moresby, PNG

September 1991

| Papua New Guinea | def. | French Polynesia |

Port Moresby, PNG

September 1991

| Solomon Islands | def. | Papua New Guinea |

Port Moresby, PNG

September 1991

| American Samoa | def. | French Polynesia |

Port Moresby, PNG

American Samoa and Solomon Islands qualify for the finals.

=== Pool B ===
Western Samoa and 2nd place Pool B qualify for finals.

=== 3rd-place ===
September 1991

| Solomon Islands | def. | 2nd place Pool B |

Port Moresby, PNG

=== Final ===
September 1991

| Western Samoa | 34-7 | American Samoa |

Port Moresby, PNG

== See also ==
- Rugby union at the Pacific Games
