= American Samoa Rugby Union =

Sports governing body in American Samoa

Amerika Samoa Rugby Union
- Sport: Rugby union
- Founded: 1990; 36 years ago
- World Rugby affiliation: 2012
- Oceania Rugby affiliation: 2004
- President: Falefata Moli Lemana
- Website: amerika-samoa-rugby-union.com

The American Samoa Rugby Union, or ASRU, is the governing body for rugby union in American Samoa. It was established in 1990, and became fully affiliated to the International Rugby Board (IRB) in 2012.

The ASRU is also a full member of the Federation of Oceania Rugby Unions (FORU), which is the regional governing body for rugby in Oceania.

It was chaired by Republican politician Te'o J. Fuavai for several decades.

== History ==
Rugby union has been played in American Samoa since the 1920s, but no governing body existed for the sport for more than 60 years thereafter. When American football was introduced to high schools in the 1970s it became the dominant game, while rugby union was only played in village competitions.

The ASRU was formally incorporated in 1990, but it took more than 20 years before the union applied for full membership of the IRB in 2011. The Executive Council of the IRB granted American Samoa full membership in 2012.

As of 2015 American Samoa's Rugby team has been ranked 102nd best team in the world, therefore making it the worst team in the world.

== National teams ==
American Samoa's national team, known as the Talavalu, has not competed in a Rugby World Cup but has competed at the South Pacific Games, including winning a silver medal for rugby 15s in 1991. American Samoa fields teams in 7s competitions as well as 15s.

== See also ==
- Rugby union in American Samoa
- American Samoa national rugby union team
- American Samoa national rugby sevens team
