= Toa Samania =

Samoan rugby union player

- Born: 20 March 1973 (age 53) Apia, Samoa
- Height: 6 ft 0 in (1.83 m)
- Weight: 196 lb (89 kg)

Rugby union career
- Position(s): Fullback, Wing
Amateur team(s)
Years	Team	Apps	(Points)
1993	Massey		
1995	Sportswood United		
2000	Waitemata		
Provincial / State sides
Years	Team	Apps	(Points)
1993	King Country	3	(11)
1995	Taranaki	5	(5)
2000	Bay of Plenty	4	(26)
International career
Years	Team	Apps	(Points)
1994-2001	Samoa	9	(22)

Toa Samania (born Apia, 4 March 1970) is a former Samoan rugby union player. He played as a fullback.

== Career ==
His first match with Samoa was in the match against Wales at Moamoa, on 25 June 1994, earning 9 caps, 22 points, 2 tries, 3 conversions and 4 penalties. He wasn't called in the Samoan team 1995 and 1999 Rugby World Cups. He retired from the international career after playing against Tonga, at Apia, on 2 June 2001. He played in the NPC for King Country, Taranaki and Bay of Plenty.
