= Rugby union at the Pacific Games =

Rugby union has been a men's medal sport at the South Pacific Games (now Pacific Games), being played at nine of the first ten competitions. The sport debuted at the inaugural 1963 games where the gold medal was won by the host nation. It was subsequently featured in the following games till the tenth games in 1995.

Prior to the late 1990s the men's tournament at the South Pacific Games, as it was then known, was contested by national rugby union teams (i.e. 15-a-side). The shorter version of the sport, rugby sevens, being better suited to multi-sports events led to the change of the games programme. The event made its debut in the Pacific Games programme at the 1997 South Pacific Mini Games.

== Results summary ==
| Year | Host | Final | | | Bronze medal match | | | Ref |
| Year | Host | Gold medal | Score | Silver medal | Bronze medal | Score | Fourth place | Ref |
|---|---|---|---|---|---|---|---|---|
| 1963 | (Fiji); Suva | Fiji | round robin | Tonga | Western Samoa | n/a | only three teams entered |
| 1966 | (New Caledonia); Nouméa | Papua New Guinea | round robin | New Caledonia | New Hebrides | round robin | Wallis and Futuna |
| 1969 | (Papua New Guinea); Port Moresby | Fiji | 88–3 | Papua New Guinea | Solomon Islands | round robin | New Caledonia |
| 1971 | (French Polynesia); Papeete | Western Samoa | 23–9 | Cook Islands | Tahiti | 14–0 | Wallis and Futuna |
| 1979 | (Fiji); Suva | Tonga | 6–3 | Fiji | New Caledonia | 9–8 | Western Samoa |
| 1983 | (Samoa); Apia | Fiji | 18–10 | Western Samoa | Tonga | 70–0 | New Caledonia |
| 1987 | (New Caledonia); Nouméa | New Caledonia | 22–9 | Cook Islands | Tahiti |
| 1991 | (Papua New Guinea); Port Moresby | Western Samoa | 34–7 | American Samoa | Solomon Islands |
| 1995 | (French Polynesia); Papeete | New Caledonia | 25–11 | Tahiti | Only two teams participated | | | (Note: As reported in Pacific Islands Monthly, Tahiti had agreed to host rugby union for the 1995 games. Initially it was decided to host 22 sports but 4 others were added (netball, squash, surfing and powerlifting).) |

== Medal table ==
The all-time medal table for rugby at the South Pacific Games, from 1963–95 is collated in the table below.

| Rank | Nation | Gold | Silver | Bronze | Total |
|---|---|---|---|---|---|
| 1 | Fiji | 3 | 1 | 0 | 4 |
| 2 | New Caledonia | 2 | 1 | 1 | 4 |
| 2 | Samoa (Note: Includes medals won as Western Samoa) | 2 | 1 | 1 | 4 |
| 4 | Tonga | 1 | 1 | 1 | 3 |
| 5 | Papua New Guinea | 1 | 1 | 0 | 2 |
| 6 | Cook Islands | 0 | 2 | 0 | 2 |
| 7 | Tahiti | 0 | 1 | 2 | 3 |
| 8 | American Samoa | 0 | 1 | 0 | 1 |
| 9 | Solomon Islands | 0 | 0 | 2 | 2 |
| 10 | Vanuatu (Note: Includes medals won as New Hebrides) | 0 | 0 | 1 | 1 |
| Totals (10 entries) | | 9 | 9 | 8 | 26 |

== Pacific Mini Games ==
| Year | Host | Final | | | Bronze medal match | | | Ref |
| Year | Host | Gold medal | Score | Silver medal | Bronze medal | Score | Fourth place | Ref |
|---|---|---|---|---|---|---|---|---|
| 1985 | (Cook Islands); Rarotonga | Cook Islands | def. | New Caledonia | Tahiti |

=== Medal table ===
All-time medal table – Pacific Mini Games Rugby
| Rank | Nation | Gold | Silver | Bronze | Total |
|---|---|---|---|---|---|
| 1 | Cook Islands | 1 | 0 | 0 | 1 |
| 2 | New Caledonia | 0 | 1 | 0 | 1 |
| 3 | Tahiti | 0 | 0 | 1 | 1 |
| Totals (3 entries) | | 1 | 1 | 1 | 3 |

== See also ==
- Rugby sevens at the Pacific Games
- Rugby union at the Summer Olympics
