= Lauaki Namulauulu Mamoe =

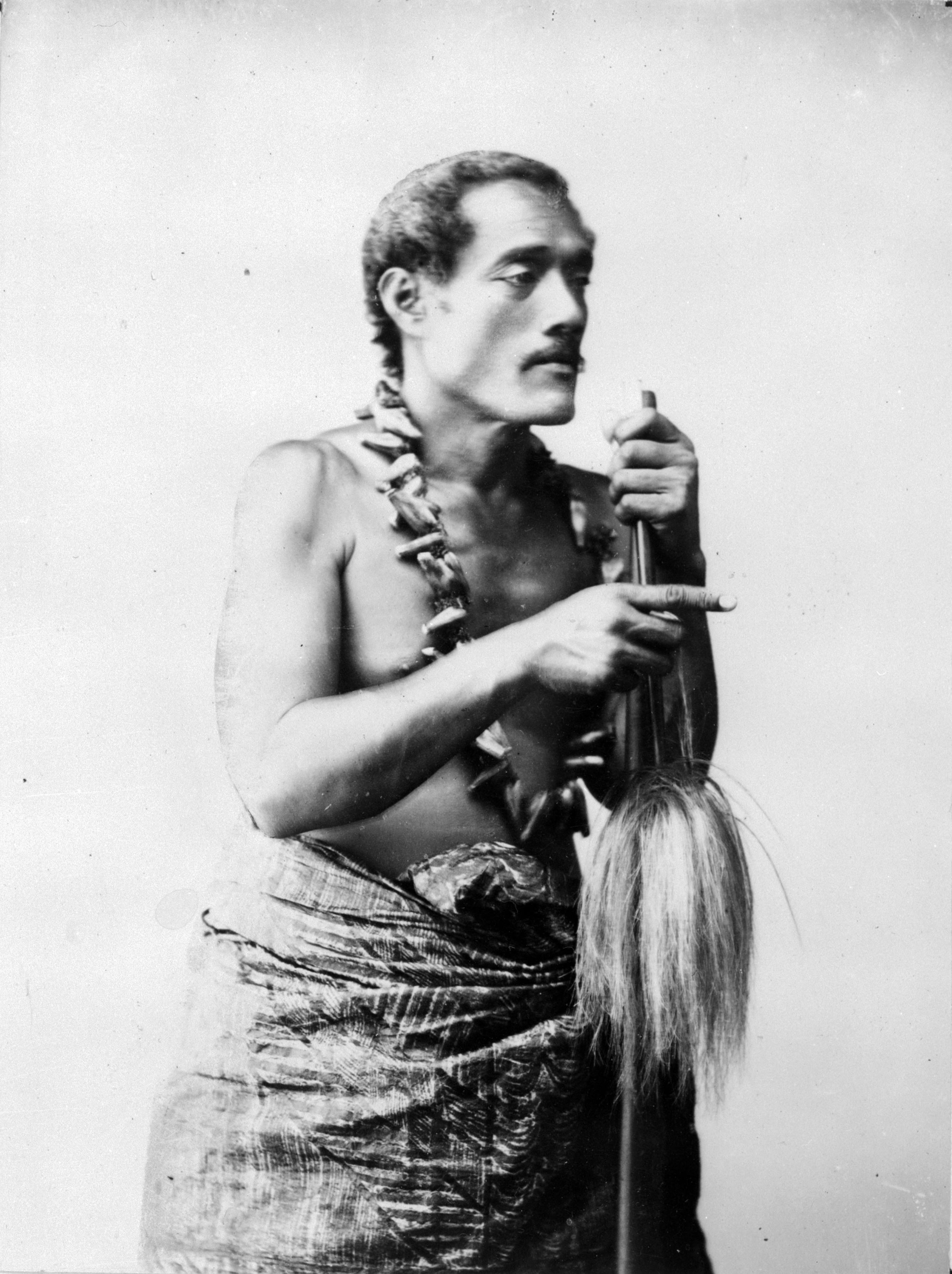
Lauaki Namulau'ulu Mamoe circa 1900

Lauaki Namulau'ulu Mamoe (died 14 December 1915) (also known as Lauati) was a renowned orator chief and the first leader of the Mau, a resistance movement in Samoa during colonialism. Mamoe was exiled to Saipan in 1909. He died in 1915 as he was taken back to Samoa.

He was from Safotulafai, the capital of Fa'asaleleaga political district on the island of Savai'i. The family matai chief title Namulau'ulu was from Safotulafai and the other chief title Lauaki came from Tonga. Mamoe was the first of his family to hold both the Namulauulu and the Lauaki titles, inherited through good service from the true heirs of the Namulauulu family. Uncertain of the outcome of his trial under German rule, he decided to bestow the title 'Namulauulu' on his younger brother, Pulali, who was also exiled and died before being allowed to return to Samoa.

== Le Mau o Pule ==
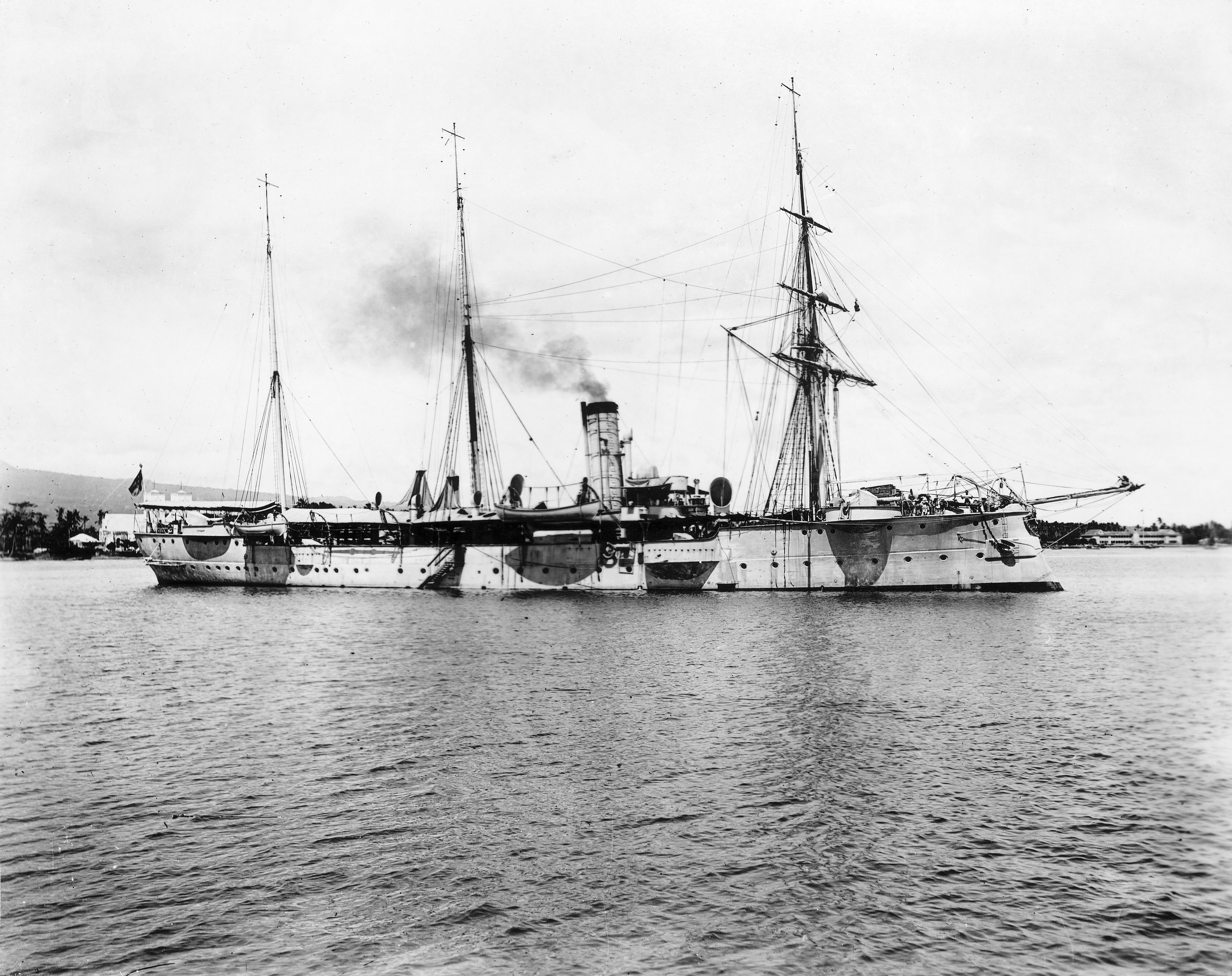
German cruiser SMS Falke in Apia harbour, 1900s.

The resistance movement led by Lauaki on Savai'i was called Mau a Pule (1908) which later grew into the national Mau movement. The Mau a Pule represented chiefs protesting against losing their traditional Samoan authority under the colonial administration headed by German Governor Wilhelm Solf. The Mau a Pule represented traditional Samoa with none or little European influence in its methods or organisation. Lauati depended on the chiefly elite of Savai'i to organise Mau a Pule support.

Pule is the traditional designation given to the Chiefs who represent the big island of Savaii and who were affiliated with the Sa Malietoa royal family. Lauaki Namulau'ulu held the position of high talking chief for Pule when the traditional power brokers of Samoa met to determine matters of national importance. Samoa's main traditional power brokers were Pule and Tumua. Tumua being the Main Chiefs who are from the island of Upolu and who supported the royal families of Tama Aiga. Upolu is the second largest island in the Samoan archipelago. The competition and rivalry between these two powerful traditional cadres of chieftains fueled the dynamics of Samoa's traditional political structure.

Lauaki and his followers were not ready to concede their authority as the decision makers for Samoa to a foreign power. This was the impetus for the Mau a Pule movement which sought to retain the authority of the Traditional political structure which was based on thousands of years of historical events, cultural designations and achievements. This indigenous structure in Lauaki's opinion, as well as many other Samoan Chiefs including Mata'afa Iosefo, who fought against foreign interference with Samoan traditional authority, was too deeply entrenched in Samoa's cultural structure, thus it was unacceptable to Lauaki for Samoans to live in a world where the Samoan way was relegated to irrelevancy.

== Exile ==
In the first months of 1909, Governor Solf called in the military to quash Lauaki and the Mau a Pule on Savai'i. Four warships and troops from the East Asia Squadron arrived. The warships cordoned off Savai'i from Upolu.

On 1 April 1909 Lauaki surrendered with other Safotulafai chiefs and Mau a Pule supporters. They were arrested and trialed. On 19 April 1909, Lauaki and 71 members of the Mau a Pule were exiled to Saipan (German colony) in the Mariana Islands aboard the ship SMS Jaguar. The other Mau a Pule leaders included I'iga Pisa, Asiata Tautoloa, Leiataua Mana, Namulauulu Pulali, Tuilagi Letasi.

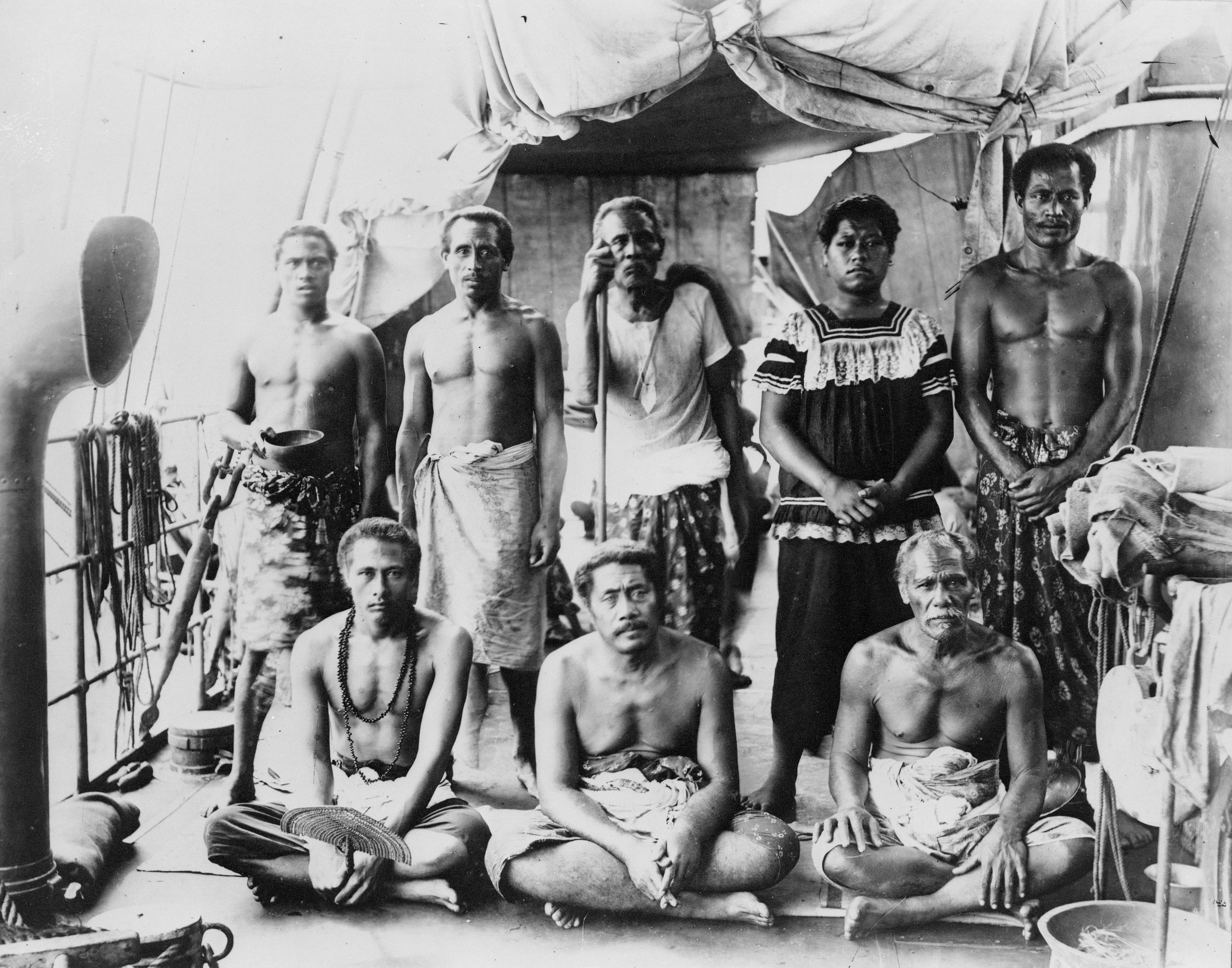
Exiled group aboard the German warship with Lauati standing 3rd from left with an orator's staff, 1909.

Among the exiles were women and children including Lauaki's wife Sivaotele and their only child, Tivoli. Lauaki never saw Samoa again and many of those banished died in exile. Years later, some of the exiles returned to Samoa.

On 18 December 1915, some of those banished returned from Saipan. They were Leiataua Mana, Taupau Pauesi, Tagaloa and Malaeulu. The bones of Asiata Taetoloa, Tevaga, Letasi, Tuilagi and members of their families who had died in Saipan were also brought back.

Lauki's younger brother died in Saipan.

While some of the exiles had returned to Samoa carrying the bones of those that had died on Saipan, Lauaki had fallen ill and had been forced to stop with his family on Tarawa island in the Gilbert Islands. Namulauulu Lauaki was the first Samoan to show nationalism, patriotic and loyal feeling for his country Samoa.

== Death ==
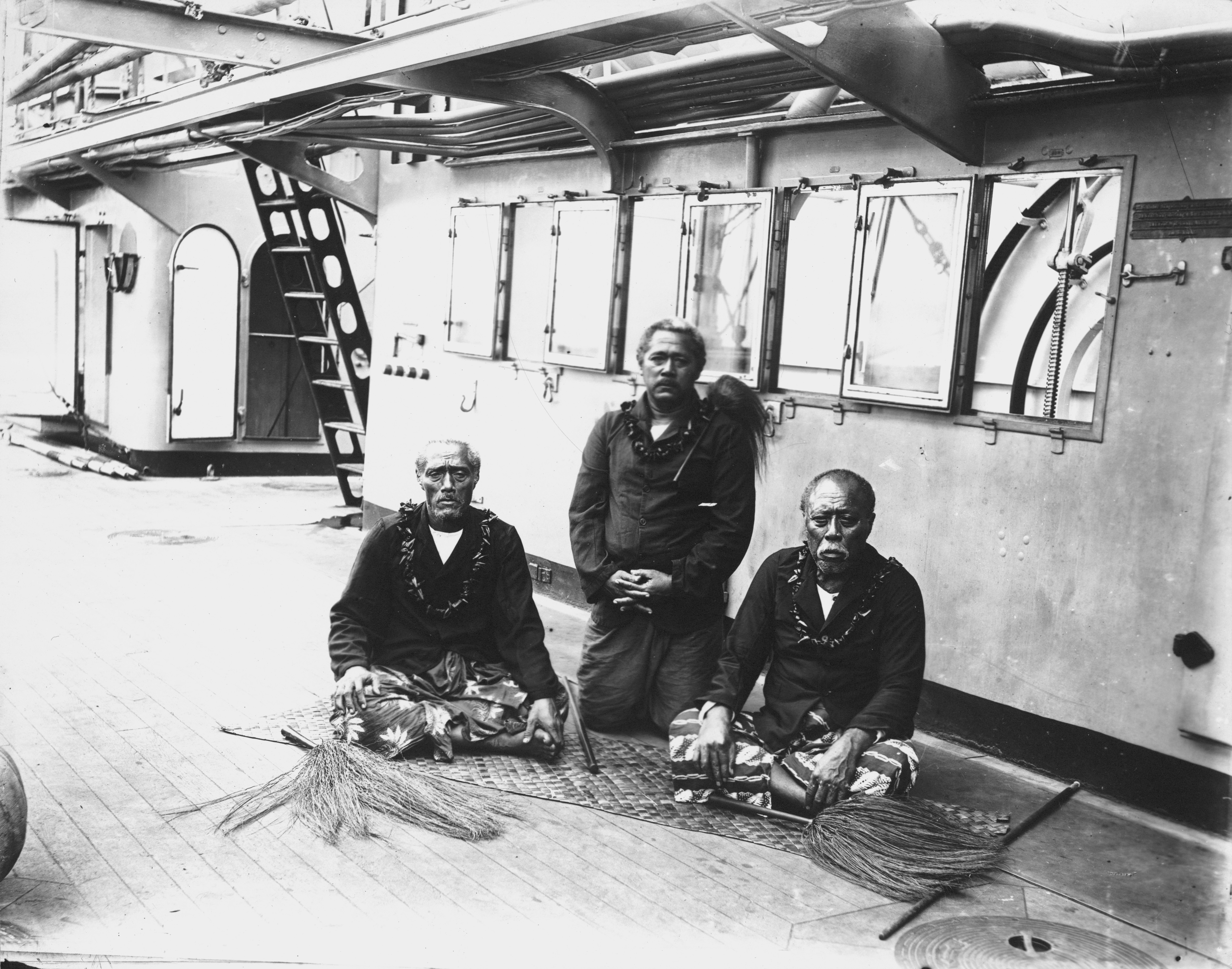
Lauati (left) and two matai chiefs aboard the German warship, 1909. All three bear the symbols of matai orator status – the fue (fly whisk made of organic sennit rope with a wooden handle).

On 15 January 1916, Sivaotele, Lauaki's wife, and their son arrived back in Samoa aboard the steamer Atua. They brought the news that Lauaki had died at 10pm on 14 December 1915 on Tarawa.

== Legacy ==
After Lauaki's death and by the late 1920s, the Mau movement had gathered widespread support in Samoa. One of the Mau leaders in the 1920s was Olaf Frederick Nelson, a merchant born in Safune to a Samoan mother and Swedish father. Nelson was also exiled from Samoa.

Samoa gained political independence in 1962.
