= American Samoa national rugby union team =

National sports team

American Samoa
- Nickname: Talavalu
- Union: American Samoa Rugby Union
- Head coach: Toma Akuino Leota
First colours

World Rugby ranking
- Current: 114 (as of 26 January 2026)
- Highest: 112
- Lowest: 114 (2026)

First international
- American Samoa 0–55 Western Samoa (September 1983)

Biggest win
- American Samoa 30–15 Solomon Islands (22 August 2015)

Biggest defeat
- American Samoa 0–55 Western Samoa (September 1983)
Medal record
Pacific Games
| Silver medal – second place | 1991 Port Moresby |

The American Samoa national rugby union team, also known as the "Talavalu", represents the American Samoa Rugby Union in international rugby union. As of January 2026, it is the lowest ranked World Rugby team.

The Talavalu is the name of a traditional Samoan war weapon, originally carved out of ironwood. As can be seen on the right side of the American Samoa Rugby Union logo, it resembles a club but has eight diamond-shaped teeth carved on one edge. Translated, "tala" is teeth, and "valu" is eight.

== History ==
National development of rugby union in American Samoa has been overshadowed by the popularity of American football since the 1970s. Unlike neighbouring Samoa, American Samoa has had limited international rugby competition. Most of American Samoa's matches have been played at the South Pacific Games.

American Samoa's first international 15's match was at the 1983 South Pacific Games in Apia, where they lost 55–0 to Western Samoa (as it was then called). They did not make the final stages of that tournament. American Samoa fared much better at the 1991 South Pacific Games in Port Moresby, notching up wins against Solomon Islands and French Polynesia. While they lost 34–7 to Western Samoa in the final, the American Samoans won the rugby 15's silver medal.

The South Pacific Games (now called the Pacific Games) subsequently switched to hosting rugby 7s in preference to rugby 15s, and the ASRU, while still eligible for the FORU Oceania Cup, turned more of its attention toward the seven-a-side form of the game. American Samoa competed at the Pacific Games Rugby 7s in 2011, and the Oceania Rugby 7s in 2011 and 2012.

In 2015 the Talavalu made their first appearance at the Oceania Rugby Cup. They won their first match against the Solomon Islands 30–15. In their second game, they lost to Papua New Guinea 36–22. Their third game against Tahiti was also a loss, 8–20. The Talavalu's finished the tournament in third place.

=== Diaspora ===
Due to limited opportunities at home, notable American Samoan players have been selected in other national teams instead of American Samoa. Frank Solomon was the pioneer, playing for New Zealand in the 1930s; and Jerome Kaino was a key member of New Zealand's Rugby World Cup-winning teams in 2011 and 2015. American Samoans that have represented United States include Mose Timoteo, Valenise Malifa, the Suniula brothers (Andrew, Roland and Shalom) and Junior Sifa.

== Record ==
=== Overall ===
Below is a table of the representative rugby matches played by an American Samoa national XV at test level up until 30 August 2015, updated after match with Tahiti.

| Opponent | Played | Won | Lost | Drawn | % Won |
|---|---|---|---|---|---|
| Papua New Guinea | 2 | 0 | 2 | 0 | 0% |
| Samoa | 2 | 0 | 2 | 0 | 0% |
| Solomon Islands | 1 | 1 | 0 | 0 | 100% |
| Tahiti | 1 | 0 | 1 | 0 | 0% |
| Total | 6 | 1 | 5 | 0 | 16.67% |

== Recent Squad ==
Squad for the 2015 Oceania Rugby Cup:

- Taeao Paaga
- Bogdaw Stewart Tuiletufuga
- Esau Tufugafale
- Tavita Collins
- Maresala Jason Tagiilima Vaeau
- Isaia Taylor
- Senio Petelo
- Jereme K. Sefuiva
- Johnny Vou
- Niki-Kata Lua
- Alesanalesili Suiaunoa
- Tauaniga Kepu
- Iopu Muliaga
- Shaun Tuiaana Salavea
- Peniata Toalepai
- Uatau Savelio Falanai
- Tiperio Finautele
- Patrick Sio Talosaga
- Tino Tapuaialupe
- Tava'e Autagavaia
- Alefaio Alefaio
- Melea Timo
- Gordon Setefano Moe
- Sonny Seti Lameta
- Faaleo Tevaga
- Lino Milo Tofailagi Iese

Management

- Toma Akuino Leota (head coach)
- Ropati Opa (assistant coach)
- Taufaiula Mavaega (team manager)
- Tommy Elisara (Assistant Manager)

== See also ==
- American Samoa national rugby sevens team
