= Eveeve =

Village on the island of Savai'i in Samoa

Coordinates: 13°40′59.02″S 172°11′7.52″W

Eveeve is a village on the island of Savai'i in Samoa. It is situated on the east coast of the island in the district of Fa'asaleleaga and the electoral district of Fa'asaleleaga 3. The population is 132.
