= Henry Tuilagi =

Samoan rugby union player (born 1976)

- Born: 12 August 1976 (age 50) Fogapoa, Samoa
- Height: 1.85 m (6 ft 1 in)
- Weight: 138 kg (21 st 10 lb) (304 lb)
- Notable relative(s): Anitelea Tuilagi (brother); Freddie Tuilagi (brother); Alesana Tuilagi (brother); Sanele Vavae Tuilagi (brother); Manu Tuilagi (brother); Posolo Tuilagi (son)

Rugby union career
- Position(s): Number 8, Flanker
Senior career
Years	Team	Apps	(Points)
2002–2003	Overmach Rugby Parma F.C.	0	(0)
2003–2007	Leicester Tigers	46	(40)
2007–2015	USA Perpignan	138	(75)
- Correct as of 3 November 2018
International career
Years	Team	Apps	(Points)
2002–2009	Samoa	10	(5)

Enele "Henry" Tuilagi (born 12 August 1976) is a Samoan former professional rugby union player who played in the 1990s, 2000s and 2010s. He appeared ten times for the Samoa national team and played club rugby in Italy, France and England.

In 2002, Tuilagi spent a year playing in the Italian Super 10 competition for Parma, where his younger brother Alesana had joined him. He appeared for Parma against London Wasps at High Wycombe in the first round of the European Challenge Cup, and then at Caerphilly in the quarter final of the same competition in January 2003. The number 8 was first included in the Samoa squad for the 2000 Pacific Rim Championship, but had to wait another two years for his test debut against Fiji in Apia, Samoa in June 2002. Both Fereti and Alesana joined him in the international team later in the month, when the three brothers played together in the World Cup qualifier against Fiji at Nadi.

Tuilagi made 24 first team appearances during his first season with the Leicester Tigers. He scored a try on his debut match against London Irish. His next season was cut short with a broken leg in the final home game against the London Wasps. He then broke his arm the next year when playing against Northampton.

The Tuilagi family have strong connections with Leicester Tigers; Henry's brother Alesana (Alex) played for Leicester before moving to play in Japan, and his brothers Fereti (Freddie), Anitelea (Andy), Manu and Sanele Vavae Tuilagi are former players.

In 2007 Tuilagi moved to France to play for Perpignan in the Top 14. His son Posolo Tuilagi (born 2004) also joined Perpignan in 2022.

In July 2020 following the death of French player Franck Lascassies, Tuilagi went public about his battle with depression.
