= Manu Tuilagi =

English rugby union player (born 1991)

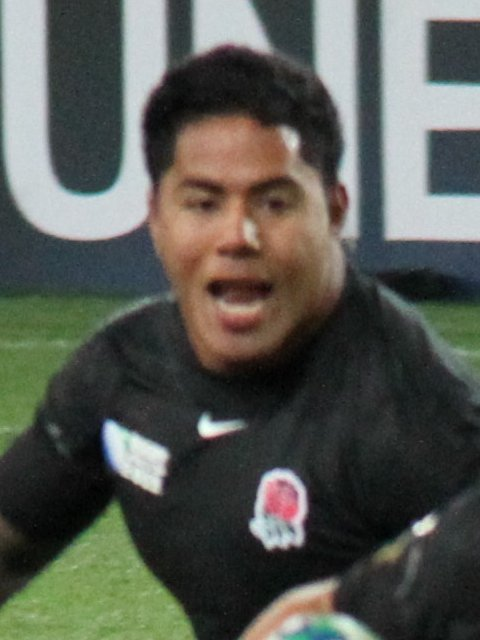
- Tuilagi representing England during the 2011 Rugby World Cup
- Full name: Etuale Manusamoa Tuilagi
- Born: 18 May 1991 (age 35) Fogapoa, Samoa
- Height: 1.85 m (6 ft 1 in)
- Weight: 112 kg (247 lb; 17 st 9 lb)
- School: John Cleveland College
- Notable relative(s): Anitelea Tuilagi (brother); Alesana Tuilagi (brother); Henry Tuilagi (brother); Sanele Vavae Tuilagi (brother); Freddie Tuilagi (brother); Posolo Tuilagi (nephew)

Rugby union career
- Position(s): Centre, Wing
- Current team: Bayonne
Senior career
| Years | Team | Apps | (Points) |
| 2009–2020 | Leicester Tigers | 128 | (205) |
| 2020–2024 | Sale Sharks | 41 | (20) |
| 2024– | Bayonne | 10 | (0) |
- Correct as of 28 August 2023
International career
| Years | Team | Apps | (Points) |
| 2009 | England U18 | 3 | (0) |
| 2011 | England A | 3 | (5) |
| 2011–2024 | England | 60 | (100) |
| 2013 | British & Irish Lions | 1 | (0) |
- Correct as of 16 March 2024

Etuale Manusamoa Tuilagi (born 18 May 1991) is a professional rugby union player who plays as a centre for Top 14 club Bayonne. Born in Samoa, he represented England at international level after qualifying on residency grounds.

== Early life ==
Tuilagi was born on 18 May 1991 in Fogapoa, Samoa. He is the younger brother of Freddie, Henry, Alesana, Anitelea and Sanele Vavae Tuilagi, all of whom are Samoan internationals and also played for Leicester. He has another sibling, Julie, who is fa'afafine. He was named Manusamoa, after the name of the Samoan national team, Manu Samoa, because his brother Freddie was selected for Samoa at the World Cup in 1991, the year Manu was born.

Tuilagi moved to the UK to join his brothers, and began playing youth rugby in 2004 with Rumney RFC while living in Cardiff, when his brother Freddie was playing for Cardiff Blues. Aged 15, he moved back to Leicester, joining the Leicester Tigers academy.

In June 2010, Tuilagi faced possible deportation from the UK after it became known that he had entered the country on a holiday visa six years earlier and had stayed on illegally. After an appeal, he was later granted indefinite leave to remain. He and his brother Alesana are both Catholic.

== Club career ==
=== Leicester Tigers ===
Tuilagi represented Leicester in the Middlesex Sevens at Twickenham in 2009. On 6 November 2009, he played for Leicester Tigers against South Africa at Welford Road. Leicester won 22–17.

Tuilagi began his first season, 2010–11, with the senior Tigers side. Tigers Director of Rugby Richard Cockerill said that he expected Tuilagi to be a first-team regular and to play for England before long. During this season he started the majority of games for Tigers and was called up for England Saxons duty. In Leicester's Premiership semi-final against Northampton Saints on 14 May 2011, Tuilagi received a yellow card for punching Chris Ashton. Tuilagi was later cited for this offence and given a 10-week ban, later reduced to five weeks.

In May 2012 Tuilagi started in the Premiership final which they lost against Harlequins to finish runners up. The following season he scored a try in the 2013 Premiership final as Leicester defeated Northampton to become league champions.

After injuring his hamstring in late 2014, Tuilagi did not play for the Tigers again until January 2016, making his comeback off the bench in the 30–27 East Midlands derby win over Northampton Saints. He played for the rest of the 2015–16 season including their European Rugby Champions Cup semi-final elimination against Racing 92 at the City Ground.

However, injury problems continued and Tuilagi was sidelined for most of the 2016–17 season with knee problems, making his comeback in the first game of the 2017–18 campaign, only to suffer a new injury to his other knee. In a bid to cure his injury problems Tuilagi visited a Samoan witch doctor in November 2017, the witch doctor claimed to have found three spirits had married Tuilagi and were causing the injuries, and massaged Tuilagi for two hours a day for four days to block the spirits.

On 10 July 2020, Tuilagi left Leicester Tigers after failing to agree a reduced wage package, amid the financial challenges caused to the club by the coronavirus pandemic.

=== Sale Sharks ===
On 13 July 2020, Tuilagi agreed to join Sale Sharks on a one-year deal until the end of the 2020–21 season. In his first season at the club he played in the 2019–20 Premiership Rugby Cup final as Sale beat Harlequins to lift the trophy. The following year saw Tuilagi sign a contract extension.

In May 2022 Tuilagi scored a try in their European quarter-final elimination against Racing 92. He started the 2023 Premiership final which Sale lost against Saracens to finish league runners up.

=== Bayonne ===
On 19 March 2024, Tuilagi agreed to join Top 14 club Bayonne on a two-year deal until the end of the 2025–26 season.

== International career ==
Tuilagi said he would prefer to play internationally for England, where he had grown up and played all of his rugby. He represented England under-18. Tuilagi had been involved with the England Sevens squad and in May 2010 played for the team which won the London Floodlit Sevens, playing under the name 'Dig Deep England'. In January 2011 he was selected to start for England 'A' against Italy and scored a second-half try in a match which England won 45–17.

In June 2011 Tuilagi was named in England's training squad for the 2011 Rugby World Cup. On 6 August 2011, he made his England Test debut in the World Cup warm-up match against Wales at Twickenham. As one of the starting XV, he scored a try in the 44th minute underneath the posts after an inside pass from Jonny Wilkinson. He then played in the third warm-up game, a victory over Ireland, and scored again. Tuilagi was included in the squad for the tournament and scored tries in pool stage victories over Georgia and Romania. He also started in their quarter-final elimination against France.

Tuilagi scored tries against Fiji and Australia during the 2012 autumn internationals. In their last fixture of that calendar year he produced one of his strongest international performances, against World champions New Zealand. England won 38–21 in what is their largest ever winning margin over the All Blacks. Tuilagi featured in all three of England's tries.

Tuilagi was named in the British & Irish Lions squad by coach Warren Gatland for their 2013 tour to Australia. He started tour fixtures against Western Force, Queensland Reds and Melbourne Rebels. He played in the third and last test against the Wallabies, coming on as a substitute in the 69th minute as the Lions won to complete a series win.

Tuilagi returned to the England squad for the 2016 Six Nations Championship having not played for the national side due to injury and disciplinary reasons since June 2014 including missing the 2015 Rugby World Cup. During the 2016 Six Nations tournament he appeared as a substitute in the penultimate round against Wales as England went on to complete their first Grand Slam for over a decade. Later that year Tuilagi was ruled out of their tour of Australia due to an injury suffered in a Premiership semi-final loss against Saracens. After not playing for England since the 2016 Six Nations he returned in November 2018 coming off the bench against Australia to win his twenty-seventh cap.

After a string of strong performances for club team Leicester Tigers, Tuilagi was selected for the 2019 Six Nations Championship. He scored two tries in the penultimate round against Italy as England ultimately finished runners up to Grand Slam winners Wales. Later that year he was included in their squad for the 2019 Rugby World Cup and scored a try in a warm-up fixture against Ireland. He produced their opening try of the tournament against Tonga and also scored their only try in the semi-final victory over New Zealand. He started in the final as England were defeated by South Africa to finish runners up.

Tuilagi scored a try and received a red card against Wales during the penultimate round of the 2020 Six Nations Championship. England ultimately won the tournament. Tuilagi was named in the squad for the 2022 autumn internationals, and played in all four games earning his fiftieth cap in a 27–13 loss to South Africa.

Tuilagi was selected for the 2023 Rugby World Cup. He started three of their four pool fixtures and broke his hand in the last pool match against Samoa. In the knockout phase he scored his twentieth and last international try in the quarter-final victory over Fiji and started the semi-final elimination against champions South Africa. He also started in their last fixture of the tournament as England defeated Argentina to finish third and claim a bronze medal.

Tuilagi made his last appearance for England in the final game of the 2024 Six Nations Championship. After the tournament he signed for Bayonne and under the RFU's current international selection policy, this would make him ineligible to represent England again and likely brings his international career to an end. He finished with twenty tries in sixty appearances for England.

== Disciplinary issues ==
Tuilagi has been involved in a number of incidents that have affected his playing career. In 2011, he was banned for five weeks for repeatedly punching Chris Ashton in the Premiership semi-final between Leicester and Northampton.

During the 2011 World Cup, Tuilagi was fined £4,800 after wearing a sponsored mouthguard, breaking the tournament's rules. In the aftermath of England's exit from the World Cup after losing to France, he was arrested by New Zealand Police for jumping into Auckland harbour from a ferry, and was subsequently fined £3,000 by the Rugby Football Union.

In September 2013, Tuilagi issued an apology to Prime Minister David Cameron after making a "bunny ears" sign behind his back during a visit by the British and Irish Lions squad to Downing Street.

In May 2015, Tuilagi was convicted of assaulting two female police officers and a taxi driver, and fined £6,205. England coach Stuart Lancaster subsequently announced that Tuilagi would not be considered for selection until January 2016, thus missing the 2015 Rugby World Cup.

In August 2017, after rejoining the England squad after a series of injuries, he returned to the team hotel drunk with teammate Denny Solomona, and they were sent home by coach Eddie Jones. Tuilagi was not selected in England's initial squad for the 2018 Six Nations.

In March 2020, Tuilagi was sent off in a Six Nations Championship match against Wales at Twickenham, which England won 33–30, after it was deemed by the Referee, Ben O'Keeffe of New Zealand, that he had committed a no-arms tackle on the Welsh winger, George North. A disciplinary panel subsequently banned Tuilagi from playing for four weeks, but he did not subsequently miss any games, owing to the coronavirus lockdown.

On 18 February 2023, Tuilagi was red carded while playing for Sale Sharks against Northampton Saints in a Premiership Rugby match. In the 13th minute he was judged to have used his non-ball carrying elbow to target the throat of opposition player Tommy Freeman. He subsequently received a four week ban.

== Career statistics ==
=== List of international tries ===
As of 15 October 2023

| Try | Opposing team | Location | Venue | Competition | Date | Result | Score |
|---|---|---|---|---|---|---|---|
| 1 | Wales | London, England | Twickenham Stadium | 2011 Rugby World Cup Warm-Up | 6 August 2011 | Win | 23 – 19 |
| 2 | Ireland | Dublin, Ireland | Aviva Stadium | 2011 Rugby World Cup Warm-Up | 27 August 2011 | Win | 20 – 9 |
| 3 | Georgia | Dunedin, New Zealand | Forsyth Barr Stadium | 2011 Rugby World Cup | 18 September 2011 | Win | 41 – 10 |
| 4 | Romania | Dunedin, New Zealand | Forsyth Barr Stadium | 2011 Rugby World Cup | 24 September 2011 | Win | 67 – 3 |
| 5 | France | Paris, France | Stade de France | 2012 Six Nations | 11 March 2012 | Win | 24 – 22 |
| 6 | Fiji | London, England | Twickenham Stadium | 2012 Autumn Internationals | 10 November 2012 | Win | 54 – 12 |
| 7 | Fiji | London, England | Twickenham Stadium | 2012 Autumn Internationals | 10 November 2012 | Win | 54 – 12 |
| 8 | Australia | London, England | Twickenham Stadium | 2012 Autumn Internationals | 17 November 2012 | Loss | 14 – 20 |
| 9 | New Zealand | London, England | Twickenham Stadium | 2012 Autumn Internationals | 1 December 2012 | Win | 38 – 21 |
| 10 | France | London, England | Twickenham Stadium | 2013 Six Nations | 23 February 2013 | Win | 23 – 13 |
| 11 | Italy | Rome, Italy | Stadio Olimpico | 2014 Six Nations | 15 March 2014 | Win | 52 – 11 |
| 12 | Italy | London, England | Twickenham Stadium | 2019 Six Nations | 9 March 2019 | Win | 57 – 14 |
| 13 | Italy | London, England | Twickenham Stadium | 2019 Six Nations | 9 March 2019 | Win | 57 – 14 |
| 14 | Ireland | London, England | Twickenham Stadium | 2019 Rugby World Cup Warm-Up | 24 August 2019 | Win | 57 – 15 |
| 15 | Tonga | Sapporo, Japan | Sapporo Dome | 2019 Rugby World Cup | 22 September 2019 | Win | 35 – 3 |
| 16 | Tonga | Sapporo, Japan | Sapporo Dome | 2019 Rugby World Cup | 22 September 2019 | Win | 35 – 3 |
| 17 | New Zealand | Yokohama, Japan | International stadium | 2019 Rugby World Cup | 26 October 2019 | Win | 19 – 7 |
| 18 | Wales | London, England | Twickenham Stadium | 2020 Six Nations | 7 March 2020 | Win | 33 – 30 |
| 19 | South Africa | London, England | Twickenham Stadium | 2021 Autumn Internationals | 20 November 2021 | Win | 27 – 26 |
| 20 | Fiji | Marseille, France | Stade de Marseille | 2023 Rugby World Cup | 15 October 2023 | Win | 30 – 24 |

== Honours ==
Leicester Tigers

- 2× Premiership Rugby: 2009–10, 2012–2013
- 2× Anglo-Welsh Cup: 2012, 2017

Sale Sharks

- 1× Premiership Rugby Cup: 2019–20
- 1× Premiership Rugby runner-up: 2022–2023

England

- 2× Six Nations: 2016, 2020
- 2× Triple Crown: 2016, 2020
- 1× Rugby World Cup runner-up: 2019

British & Irish Lions

- 1× British & Irish Lions series: 2013
