= Sanele Vavae Tuilagi =

Samoan rugby union player (born 1988)

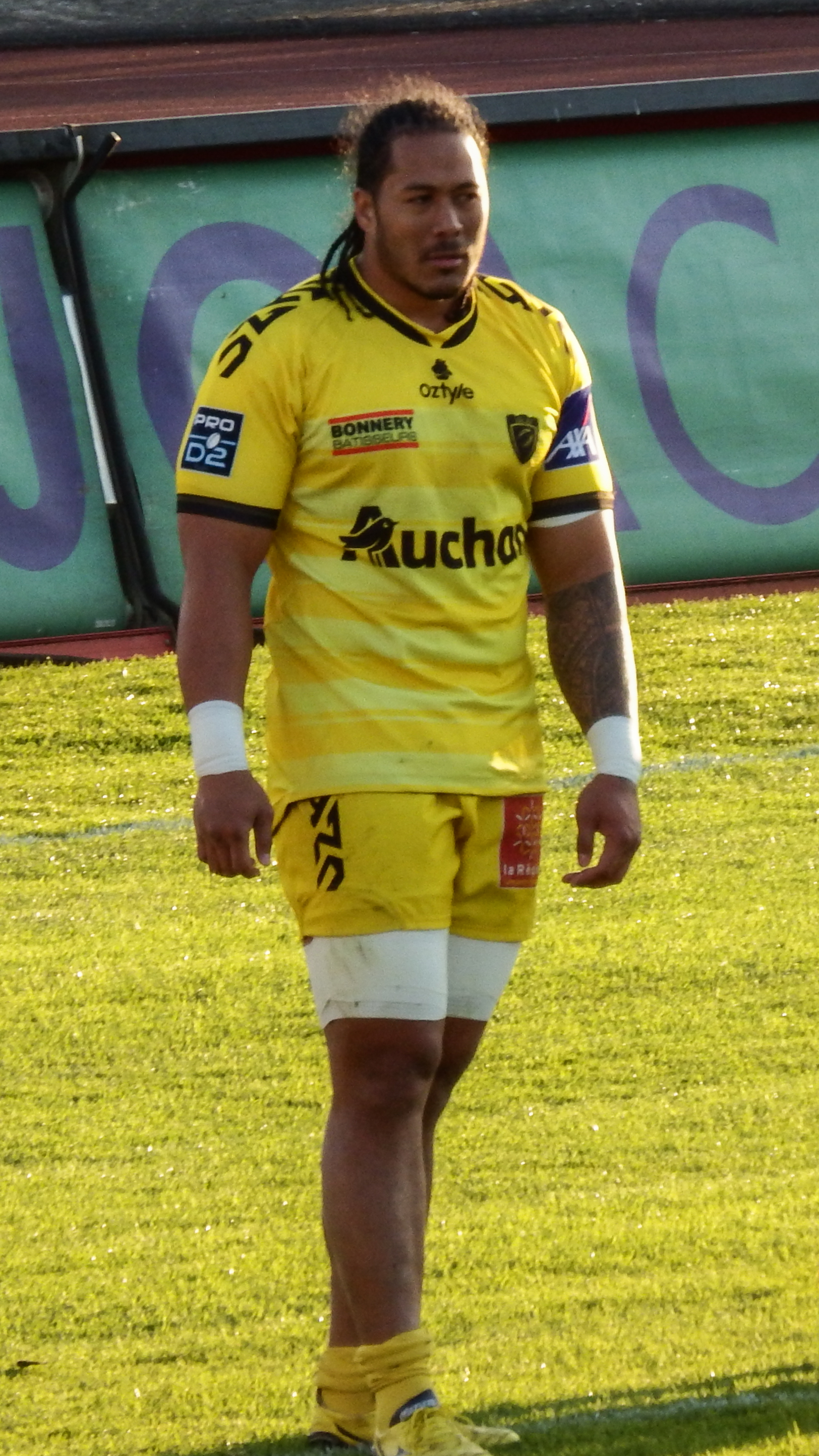
- Tuilagi during the 2015–16 Rugby Pro D2 season

Personal information
- Full name: Sanele Vavae Tuilagi
- Born: 15 June 1988 (age 37) Fogapoa, Samoa
- Height: 6 ft 2 in (1.87 m)
- Weight: 254 lb; 18 st 2 lb (115 kg)

Playing information

Rugby union
- Position: Number 8
Club
Years	Team	Pld	T	G	FG	P
2007–09	Leicester Tigers	3	0	0	0	0
2011–13	RC Narbonne	32	5	0	0	25
2013	US Carcassonne					85
	Total	35	5	0	0	110
Representative
Years	Team	Pld	T	G	FG	P
2015	Samoa	9	0	0	0	0
2008	Samoa U20	>5	3	0	0	15

Rugby league
Club
Years	Team	Pld	T	G	FG	P
	AS Carcassonne

Sanele Vavae Tuilagi (born 15 June 1988) is a Samoan professional rugby player. Sanele is the younger brother of former and current Samoan internationals Henry, Freddie, Alesana, Anitelea Tuilagi and the older brother of England international Manu Tuilagi.

Tuilagi played for the Samoan National U-20 team in the 2008 IRB Junior World Championship. He also represented Savaii Samoa in the 2010 IRB Pacific Rugby Cup. In 2015, he represented the Samoan national side, making his debut in the opening round of the 2015 World Rugby Pacific Nations Cup against the United States.

Tuilagi played for French club Narbonne in the Rugby Pro D2. He now plays for US Carcassonne and is also playing rugby league for AS Carcassonne in the Elite One Championship.
