= Freddie Tuilagi =

Samoan rugby player (born 1971)

- Born: Fereti Tuilagi; 9 June 1971 (age 55) Apia, Samoa
- Height: 1.80 m (5 ft 11 in)
- Weight: 102 kg (225 lb; 16 st 1 lb)
- Notable relative(s): Anitelea Tuilagi (brother); Alesana Tuilagi (brother); Henry Tuilagi (brother); Sanele Vavae Tuilagi (brother); Manu Tuilagi (brother)
- Occupation: Director of Rugby for Kesteven Rugby Football Club

Rugby union career
- Position: Centre
Senior career
Years	Team	Apps	(Points)
2000–2004	Leicester	76	(75)
2004–2005	Cardiff	7	(5)
2005–2006	Castres	12	(0)
International career
Years	Team	Apps	(Points)
1992–2002	Samoa	17	(10)

Official website
- https://www.tuilagirugbyskills.com/
- Rugby league career

Playing information
- Position: centre
Club
Years	Team	Pld	T	G	FG	P
1995–1998	Halifax	91				140
1999–2000	St. Helens	62	21	0	0	84
	Total	153	21	0	0	224

Fereti Tuilagi (born 9 June 1971) is a Samoan former professional rugby footballer of the 1990s and 2000s. After playing rugby union at international level, he turned professional and played rugby league for English clubs Halifax Blue Sox and St. Helens. He played as a wing or centre and is now retired. His first name is often anglicised to Freddie.

Tuilagi is the oldest of seven brothers: Henry, Olotuli, Alesana, Anitelea, Vavae and Manu. All but Olotuli have played for Leicester Tigers. In a 2015 preseason friendly, his son Fred Tuilagi also made an appearance for Leicester Tigers and became the 8th Tuilagi to get his senior cap for the Tigers coming off the bench in the Anglo-Welsh Cup 21–20 victory over Bath Rugby. Tuilagi currently coaches children at his own rugby skills course named 'Tuilagi Rugby Skills Courses'.

== International career ==
Tuilagi was born 9 June 1971 in Apia, Samoa, and gained his first international experience playing for Samoa on the 1991 tour to New Zealand. He was also selected for Samoa's 1991 Rugby World Cup squad but did not play in any of the matches.

Between 1992 and 1995, he toured with Samoa to Australia and South Africa, and was included in their 1995 Rugby World Cup squad. He played against South Africa in the quarter final.

== Rugby league ==
After the 1995 world cup, Tuilagi turned professional for the Halifax Rugby League team, making 57 Super League appearances for them in two years, scoring an impressive 26 tries. In 1999, he joined St Helens. Tuilagi played for St. Helens at second-row in their 1999 Super League Grand Final victory over Bradford Bulls. Having won the 1999 Championship, St. Helens contested in the 2000 World Club Challenge against National Rugby League Premiers the Melbourne Storm, with Tuilagi playing from the interchange bench in the loss. He also played for St Helens from the interchange bench, scoring a try in their 2000 Super League Grand Final victory over Wigan Warriors. He'd made 35 appearances, scoring eleven tries.

== Northern hemisphere rugby union ==
He left St. Helens in June 2000 and signed for Leicester Tigers, also making his return to the Samoa national side. He toured with them in the summer of 2002. He was also selected to tour New Zealand, but was prevented from doing so by an injury, which also denied him a place in national side's world cup squad. Tuilagi started the victorious 2002 Heineken Cup Final for Leicester. In the 2003–4 season his younger brother Henry also signed for Leicester, and his younger brother Alesana joined the following season. In 2004–5 season Tuilagi signed for Cardiff Blues. Unfortunately injury limited the number of times he was able to play for Cardiff and was released early. In 2005–6 season Tuilagi played for Castres Olympique in the French Top 14.

== Post-playing career ==
Since retiring from playing, Tuilagi has acted as an agent for several players – mainly Samoans playing abroad through his company Global Bro Sports. Tuilagi also had a spell playing American football for the Leicester Falcons during the 2008 and 2009 seasons. Tuilagi stood down as Director of Rugby & head coach for Kesteven Rugby Football Club on 6 May 2022 and is now head coach for Market Rasen & Louth RUFC .
