= Alesana Tuilagi =

Samoa international rugby union player

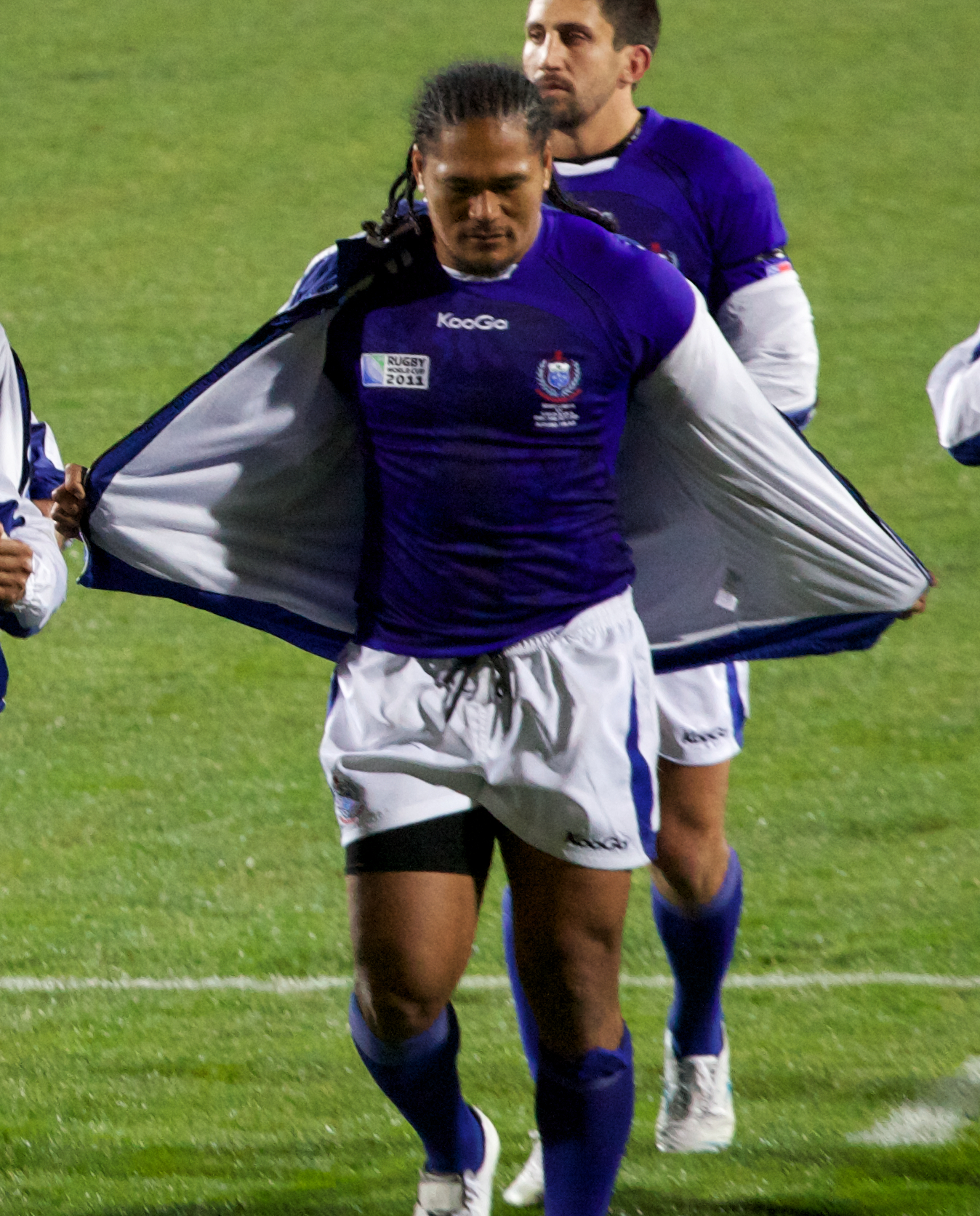
- Tuilagi at 2011 Rugby World Cup during South Africa vs Samoa match
- Born: Alesana Tuilagi; 24 February 1981 (age 45) Fogapoa, Samoa
- Height: 1.92 m (6 ft 3 1/2 in)
- Weight: 124 kg (273 lb; 19 st 7 lb)
- School: John Cleveland College
- Notable relative(s): Anitelea, Freddie, Henry, Sanele Vavae & Manu (brothers)

Rugby union career
- Position: Wing
- Current team: RC Toulonnais
Senior career
Years	Team	Apps	(Points)
2002–04	Parma	0	(0)
2004–12	Leicester Tigers	162	(315)
2012–14	NTT Communications Shining Arcs	18	(15)
2014–2016	Newcastle Falcons	14	(10)
2016–2017	RC Toulonnais	2	(0)
- Correct as of 2 November 2018
International career
Years	Team	Apps	(Points)
2002–13, 2015–	Samoa	37	(90)
2006	Pacific Islanders	1	(0)
- Correct as of 3 October 2015
National sevens team
Years	Team		Comps
- Samoa

Alesana "Alex" Tuilagi (born 24 February 1981) is a former Samoan rugby player. He is a retired rugby player, currently residing in Fogapoa Savaii and has appeared numerous times for his national team Samoa. He previously played for Parma in Italy and for Leicester Tigers in the Aviva Premiership and more recently Newcastle Falcons.

== Career ==
The Tuilagi family has strong connections with Leicester Tigers; Alesana's brothers Henry, Anitelea (Andy), and Fereti (Freddie) are all former players and two younger brothers, Vavae and Manu Tuilagi both played in a game for Leicester Tigers against the Classic All Blacks, on 25 May 2008.

Whilst at Parma, whom Tuilagi played with for two seasons, he was equal second top try scorer of the league for the 2003–04 season, with 12 tries in total for the season. He helped them get to the semi-finals of both the domestic competition, and the Parker Pen Shield. He made his debut for Samoa in a 2003 Rugby World Cup qualifier against Fiji in June 2002. In 2004 Tuilagi's illegal tackle on Mark Cueto began a scuffle that led to the yellow carding of Semo Sititi, and red cards for Tuilagi and, Tigers team mate, Lewis Moody who became the first England player to be sent off at Twickenham.

Tuilagi was included in the Pacific Islanders rugby union team tour to Europe in late 2006 and played a significant part in the Samoan national teams' successes in the Rugby World Cup in 2007.

Tuilagi enjoyed his best-ever season in 2010/11, finishing the season as the club's top try-scorer and as Aviva Premiership top scorer for the first time. The big Samoan collected 17 tries in all competitions, with 13 in the Premiership, including the match-winner in the semi-final against Northampton Saints and a hat-trick against Gloucester at Welford Road.

Playing alongside younger brother Manu, Alesana lined up against older sibling Henry during the Heineken Cup in 2010/11 and has also played against Anitelea in the Premiership. Tuilagi has started eight of Tigers' nine finals since 2006/07, missing out only on the Guinness Premiership Final against London Irish in 2009 due to suspension. He was Man of the Match in the 2006/07 Premiership Final win over Gloucester, scoring two tries, and started the 2010 final when Leicester defeated Saracens. He was also named Supporters' Player of the Year in same season.

Tuilagi was again included in Samoa's squad to the 2011 Rugby World Cup in New Zealand. He started in all 4 pool games and scored a hat trick against Namibia. After the eight years with Leicester, Tuilagi left following the 2011–12 Aviva Premiership season to join NTT Communications Shining Arcs of the Japanese Top League. On 8 May 2014, Tuilagi returned to England to compete in the Aviva Premiership with Newcastle Falcons on a two-year contract, rejoining with his brother Anitelea Tuilagi.

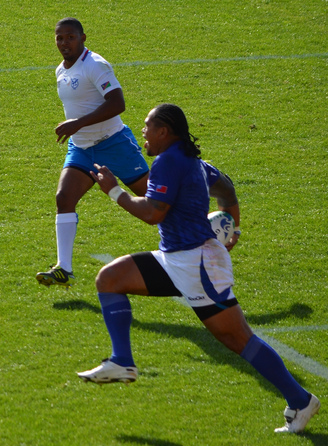
Tuilagi making a break for Samoa vs Namibia in the 2011 Rugby World Cup

=== Historic win ===
Tuilagi was part of the Samoan squad that beat Australia 32 – 23 on 17 July 2011 at Sydney in a test match. Tuilagi made the opening try as Samoa ran in 4 tries to Australia's two.

On 25 June 2013 Tuilagi was called up to the Samoan squad for the SA tour and the 2013 Pacific Cup

== Personal life ==
Tuilagi has five brothers Henry, Anitelea (Andy), Fereti (Freddie), Vavae and Manu Tuilagi who are all rugby players. He and Manu are both Catholic.

Tuilagi was arrested on 26 August 2014 in Dublin after presenting himself at Dublin Airport. A European arrest warrant had been issued relating to an assault in a Dublin night club a number of years previously.

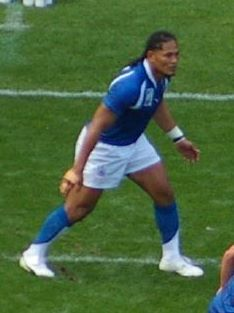
Tuilagi playing for Samoa in the 2007 Rugby World Cup against South Africa
