= New Caledonia national rugby union team =

New Caledonia
- Union: Comité Régional de Rugby de Nouvelle Calédonie

First international
- New Caledonia 0–34 Papua New Guinea (Nouméa, December 1966)

Biggest win
- New Caledonia 36–5 Wallis and Futuna (Nouméa, 29 October 2001)

Biggest defeat
- New Caledonia 3–113 Fiji (Port Moresby, 20 August 1969)
Medal record
Pacific Games
Gold medal – first place	1987 Noumea
Gold medal – first place	1995 Papeete
Silver medal – second place	1966 Noumea
Bronze medal – third place	1979 Suva
Pacific Mini Games
Silver medal – second place	1985 Rarotonga

The New Caledonia national rugby union team represents New Caledonia in rugby union. The team has been playing international rugby since the 1960s. All their matches have been against other teams from Oceania.

New Caledonia has competed at the South Pacific Games, winning a silver medal in 1966 before finishing out of the medals at the 1969 games. The team won the gold medal in 1987, defeating Cook Islands in the final in Nouméa, and won gold again at the boycott-affected games in Papeete in 1995 where Tahiti was the only other competing team.

More recently, the team has played for the FORU Oceania Cup. In 2008, their win over fellow Pacific rivals Vanuatu in Nouméa, 32–20, paved their way to the final of the competition, but New Caledonia lost the match to Niue, 5–27.

== Record ==
Below is a table of the representative rugby matches played by a New Caledonia national XV at test level up until 30 August 2008, updated after match with Niue.

Opponent	Played	Won	Lost	Drawn	% Won
Cook Islands	2	0	2	0	0%
Fiji	2	0	2	0	0%
Fiji Warriors	1	0	1	0	0%
Niue	2	0	2	0	0%
Papua New Guinea	3	1	2	0	33.33%
Samoa	1	0	1	0	0%
Solomon Islands	1	1	0	0	100%
Tahiti	1	0	1	0	0%
Tonga	2	0	2	0	0%
Vanuatu	4	3	1	0	75%
Wallis and Futuna	1	1	0	0	100%
Total	20	6	14	0	30%

== See also ==
- French Rugby Federation
- Comité Régional de Rugby de Nouvelle Calédonie
- Rugby union in New Caledonia
