= Anitelea Tuilagi =

Samoan rugby union player (born 1986)

Andy Tuilagi
- Born: Anitele'a Faivai Tuilagi; 5 June 1986 (age 40) Apia, Samoa
- Height: 185 cm (6 ft 1 in)
- Weight: 118 kg (18 st 8 lb; 260 lb)
- School: Tuasivi College
- Notable relative(s): Freddie Tuilagi (brother); Henry Tuilagi (brother); Alesana Tuilagi (brother); Vavae Tuilagi (brother); Manu Tuilagi (brother)

Rugby union career
- Position(s): Centre, Wing
Senior career
Years	Team	Apps	(Points)
2005–2006	Leicester Tigers	0	(0)
2006–2008	Yorkshire Carnegie	18	(10)
2008-2011	Sale Sharks	29	(15)
2011-2013	Newport Gwent Dragons	42	(25)
2014-2016	Newcastle Falcons	10	(5)
2016-2017	Tarbes Pyrénées Rugby	2	(0)
- Correct as of 3 November 2018
International career
Years	Team	Apps	(Points)
2005–2014	Samoa	17	(25)
- Correct as of 3 January 2015

Anitelea "Andy" Tuilagi (born 5 June 1986) is a Samoan international rugby union player. His position is either centre or wing. He is part of the famous Tuilagi rugby family, with his older brothers Henry, Freddie, Alesana, and younger brothers Vavae and Manu all also having played international rugby.

He has played club rugby for Leicester Tigers, in the Aviva Premiership, and a season loan at Leeds Tykes, now Yorkshire Carnegie, in National Division One. Tuilagi made his Leicester début at Welford Road against Gloucester as a replacement.

Following a loan period at Leeds, Tuilagi ended his contract with Leicester Tigers to join Yorkshire Carnegie full-time.

On 19 August 2008 Tuilagi was confirmed as the last signing that would be joining Guinness Premiership side Sale Sharks on a four-year contract.

On 13 June 2011 Sale Sharks announced that Tuilagi had been released from his contract after three years and on 29 November 2011 he joined Newport Gwent Dragons. He made his debut against Glasgow Warriors on 4 December 2011. He left Newport Gwent Dragons at the end of the 2012-13 season after turning down a new contract. On 8 May 2014, Antielea returned to England as signed for Newcastle Falcons in the Aviva Premiership on a two-year contract from the 2014-15 season, where he will join with his brother, Alesana Tuilagi.

== International career ==
Tuilagi became the youngest player to play for Samoa at aged 19 years and 27 days when he made his debut in July 2005 against Tonga, where he scored a try to also become the youngest player ever to score for Samoa.

He was named in the 2007 Rugby World Cup squad, but was forced out of the tournament through injury. Since then he has been dropped out of favour in international rugby, his last call up coming in 2014 after 5 years out of the side.
