= Fogapoa =

Village on the island of Savai'i in Samoa

Coordinates: 13°40′S 172°11′W

Fogapoa is a village on the north east coast of Savai'i island in Samoa. The village is part of the electoral constituency (Faipule District) Fa'asaleleaga 3 which is within the larger political district (Itumalo) of Fa'asaleleaga.

The population is 309. Fogapoa is also part of the sub-district Safotulafai, the traditional centre of Fa'asaleleaga District.
