= Samoa national rugby union team =

National rugby union team of Samoa

Samoa
- Nickname: Manu Sāmoa
- Emblem: Southern cross
- Union: Rugby Samoa
- Head coach: Tusi Pisi
- Captain: Theo McFarland
- Most caps: Brian Lima (67)
- Top scorer: Tusi Pisi (245)
- Top try scorer: Brian Lima (29)
- Home stadium: Apia Park
First colours	Second colours

World Rugby ranking
- Current: 18 (as of 6 July 2026)
- Highest: 7 (2012, 2013)
- Lowest: 20 (2026)

First international
- Western Samoa 0–6 Fiji (Apia, Samoa; 18 August 1924)

Biggest win
- Samoa 115–7 Papua New Guinea (Apia, Samoa; 11 July 2009)

Biggest defeat
- New Zealand 101–14 Samoa (New Plymouth, New Zealand; 3 September 2008)

World Cup
- Appearances: 9 (first in 1991)
- Best result: Quarterfinals (1991, 1995)
Medal record
Pacific Games
Gold medal – first place	1971 Papeete
Gold medal – first place	1991 Port Moresby
Silver medal – second place	1983 Apia
Bronze medal – third place	1963 Suva
- Website: http://www.lakapisamoa.com

The Samoa national rugby union team (Samoan: ʻau lakapī o Sāmoa) represents Samoa in international men's rugby union competitions. They are governed by Samoa Rugby Union and also known as Manu Sāmoa (Samoan: [ˈmanʉ saːˈmoːa]), which is thought to derive from the name of a Samoan warrior. They perform a traditional Samoan challenge called the siva tau before each game. Samoa Rugby Union were formerly members of the Pacific Islands Rugby Alliance (PIRA) along with Fiji and Tonga.

Rugby was introduced to Samoa in the 1890s but a governing body was not formed for some years, and neither was a club competition organised until after World War I. The first international was played as Western Samoa against Fiji in August 1924. Along with Tonga, these nations would meet regularly and eventually contest competitions such as the Pacific Tri-Nations – with Western Samoa winning the first of these. From 1924 to 1997 Samoa was known as Western Samoa.

Samoa have been to every Rugby World Cup since the 1991 tournament. That tournament, along with the 1995 competition, saw them make the quarterfinals. Under their new coach, former New Zealand and Samoan international player Michael Jones, Samoa competed in the 2007 Rugby World Cup. However, Samoa had a dismal World Cup campaign, winning only one match and finishing fourth in their group. Samoa showed an improved performance at the 2011 Rugby World Cup, winning two matches by comfortable margins, and losing close matches to South Africa and Wales.

== History ==
The Marist Brothers brought rugby to Western Samoa in 1924 and The Western Samoa Rugby Football Union was formed in 1924. Another is that a large tree was growing in the middle of the Apia Park pitch when Samoa played its first test in 1924.

The man who brought rugby to Samoa was a New Zealand surveyor, Norman Macdonald, who arrived in the country in 1892. He organised games on an ad-hoc basis, often against crews from visiting ships. Native Samoans were encouraged to play right from the start, and did so. During the German colonial era these games still happened on an irregular basis, but the arrival of New Zealand troops in the early stages of World War I meant rugby wasn't far behind.

The first match for which a score has been preserved was played in 1918 between the Garrison and a Home XV, which the soldiers won 13-6. Club rugby began in 1923 when four clubs - Barbarians, Nomads, Rovers and United - contested the first championship. Matches were played at Pilot Point, and that ground did have a tree inside the playing area; the newspaper reports often mentioned it. By the end of that season development work was beginning at Apia Park; the ground was levelled and a football pitch was prepared, cleared of all weeds and made up to international size.

On 18 August 1924, Western Samoa played its first international against Fiji in the capital Apia, the visitors winning 6–0. The match was played at 7 am to allow the Samoans time to get to work afterwards and the ship taking the Fijian team to Tonga to make its sailing time. The return match, a month later, was won 9–3 by Samoa.

The Apia Rugby Union was formed in 1927, with eight clubs, and affiliated to the New Zealand Rugby Union that year. The Western Samoa Rugby Union wasn't formed as the governing body until 1958.

Club rugby changed formats in 1936, becoming a mercantile competition with business house teams replacing the village sides. This carried on until 1940, when the game closed down during World War II. It was resumed in 1946 and had another brief hiatus until a full club competition was played in 1953; this has run uninterrupted since.

In 1956 Western Samoa visited both Pacific Island neighbors Fiji and Tonga, but had to wait a further 20 years before a tour of New Zealand took place. The Samoans won one of eight matches on that 1956 tour.

The traditional tri-series between Tonga, Fiji and Western Samoa was established in 1982 with Western Samoa winning the first tournament. Wales visited Western Samoa and won the test 32–16 at Apia. The tour led to a return visit to Wales which brought Western Samoa out of International limbo, although Western Samoa were not invited to the first Rugby World Cup in 1987.

The following year a 14-match tour of Europe took place before a World Cup elimination series in Tokyo, which gave Western Samoa a place in the 1991 Rugby World Cup in Britain. They made a huge impact. After sweeping aside Wales 16–13 in Cardiff and defeating Argentina 35–12, and narrowly losing 3–9 to eventual champions Australia in their pool match, Western Samoa, a country with a population of 160,000, found itself in the quarterfinals against Scotland at Murrayfield. The Scots won comfortably 28–6, but the Samoans were clearly the personality team of the tournament. One Welsh fan ruefully remarked after Wales's defeat, "It's a good job we weren't playing all of Samoa."

Over the next two years, the side had a number of notable wins. The most outstanding achievements were in Sevens where it won the 1993 Hong Kong and 1992 Middlesex Sevens. The 1995 Rugby World Cup in South Africa proved that the team belonged in top company. They again reached the quarterfinals after wins over Argentina and Italy, but were beaten 42–14 by the eventual winners South Africa. After the Cup, Manu Samoa made a 13-match tour of England and Scotland, drawing 15–15 with the Scots and going down 27–9 to England.

With the advent of professional rugby in 1995 it was vital for Manu Samoa to develop a new administrative structure. This was made possible with Fay Richwhite and the Western Samoan Rugby Union joining forces to form Manu Samoa Rugby Limited. Fay Richwhite invested $5 million from 1995 to 2004 into Samoan rugby.

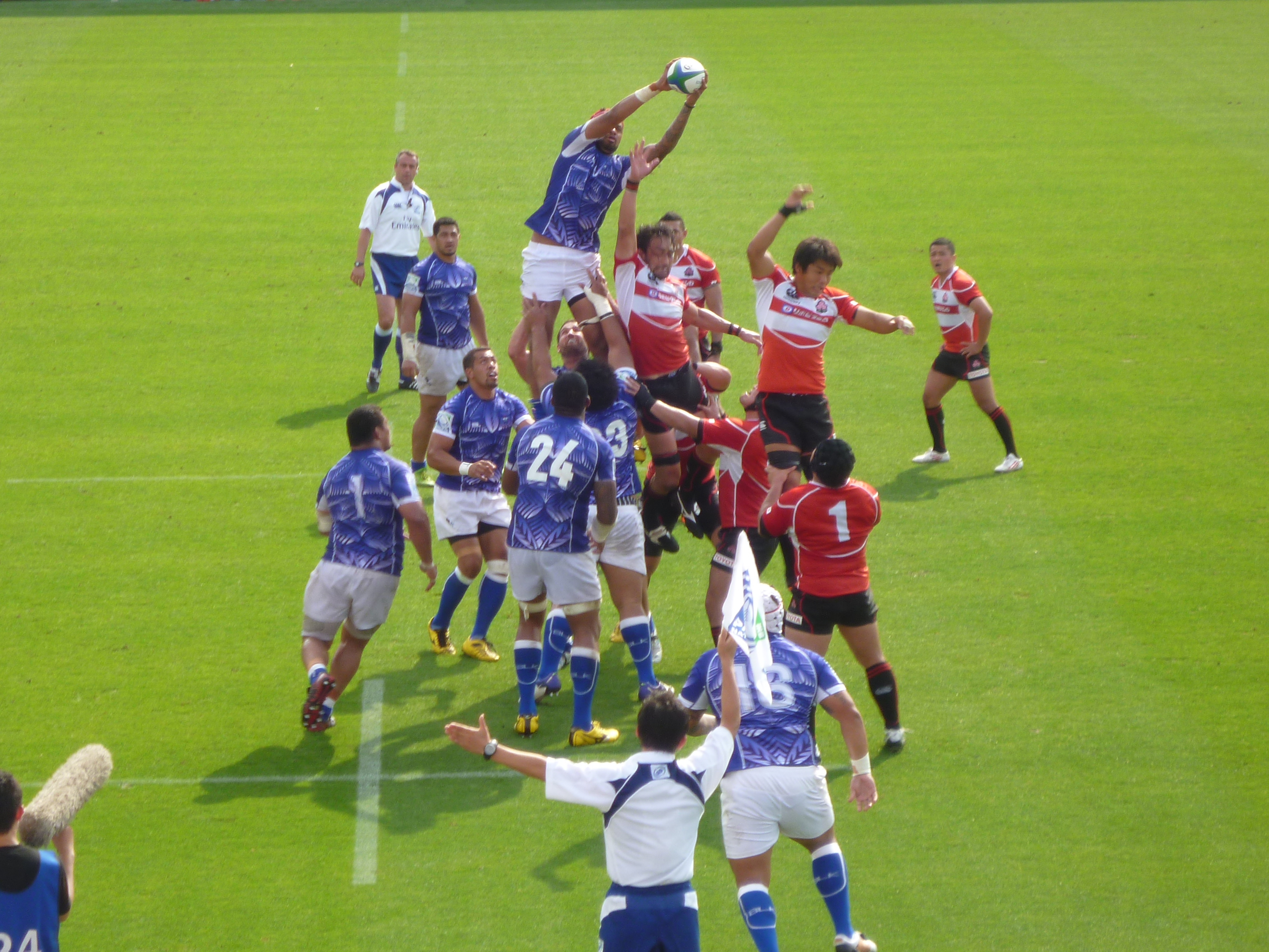
Japan vs Samoa Rugby Match at Chichibunomiya Stadium on 17 June 2012, which was won by Samoa 27–26

Samoa emerged from the 1999 World Cup with its honor intact after another shock 38–31 victory over host nation Wales in the pool stages. They again lost out to Scotland in the quarterfinal play-off.

Manu Samoa qualified for the 2003 World Cup with a 17–16 loss against Fiji, Earl Va'a missing an injury-time penalty. They recovered to beat Tonga both home and away and avenged that Fijian defeat with a 22–12 win in Nadi. They ultimately had to settle for second place in the round robin, behind Fiji on points difference, and a place in the tougher of the two Rugby World Cup 2003 pools alongside automatic qualifiers England and South Africa. In one of the games of the tournament, they led eventual champions England for most of the game before losing 35–22.

Samoa qualified for the 2011 World Cup after beating Papua New Guinea 73–12 in Port Moresby on 18 July 2009. They won 188–19 on aggregate over two matches against Papua New Guinea, having won 115–7 at Apia Park the previous week.

Samoa began their 2011 World Cup campaign preparation with a flying start, after registering an upset against No.2 ranked Australia with a four-try-to-two win of 32–23.

In November 2017, Samoa's prime minister and SRU chairman Tuila'epa Sa'ilele Malielegaoi announced that the organisation was bankrupt, although those claims were denied by world governing body World Rugby.

== Overall record ==
Men's World Rugby Rankings Top 20 as of 16 November 2026
Rank	Change (Note: Change from the previous week)	Team	Points
1	Steady	South Africa	91.53
2	Steady	New Zealand	90.65
3	▲1	France	89.05
4	▼1	Ireland	88.70
5	Steady	England	86.99
6	Steady	Scotland	85.28
7	Steady	Australia	82.24
8	Steady	Argentina	82.09
9	▲1	Wales	79.37
10	▼1	Fiji	77.79
11	Steady	Italy	75.84
12	Steady	Japan	75.25
13	Steady	Georgia	74.23
14	▲1	United States	68.39
15	▼1	Portugal	68.24
16	▲3	Samoa	67.60
17	▲1	Chile	67.00
18	▼2	Spain	66.53
19	▼2	Tonga	65.58
20	Steady	Uruguay	65.17

Samoa's historical rankings

Source: World Rugby
Graph updated to 16 November 2026

Below is a table of the representative rugby matches played by a Samoa national XV at test level up until 21 November 2026, updated after match with Spain.

Opponent	Played	Won	Lost	Drawn	Win %	For	Aga	Diff
Argentina	5	3	2	0	60%	121	101	+20
Australia	6	1	5	0	16.67%	73	238	−165
Australia A	1	1	0	0	100%	31	26	+5
Barbarians	1	0	1	0	0%	24	27	−3
Belgium	2	1	0	1	50%	50	21	+29
Brazil	1	1	0	0	100%	48	10	+38
Canada	6	6	0	0	100%	169	103	+66
Chile	3	1	1	1	33.33%	87	73	+14
Cook Islands	3	3	0	0	100%	102	31	+71
England	9	0	9	0	0%	131	310	−179
Fiji	57	21	33	3	36.84%	994	1,173	−179
Fiji Warriors	3	0	3	0	0%	20	58	−38
France	4	0	4	0	0%	49	156	−107
Georgia	7	2	4	1	28.57%	147	143	+4
Germany	2	2	0	0	100%	108	43	+65
Hong Kong	1	1	0	0	100%	66	19	+47
Ireland	8	1	7	0	12.5%	121	273	−152
Italy	9	6	3	0	66.67%	225	183	+42
Japan	19	12	7	0	63.16%	574	410	+164
South Korea	1	1	0	0	100%	74	7	+67
Namibia	3	3	0	0	100%	115	33	+82
New Caledonia	1	1	0	0	100%	28	6	+22
New Zealand	7	0	7	0	0%	72	411	−339
Papua New Guinea	2	2	0	0	100%	188	19	+169
Portugal	1	1	0	0	100%	36	5	+31
Romania	4	1	3	0	25%	96	87	+9
Russia	1	1	0	0	100%	34	9	+25
Scotland	13	1	11	1	7.69%	205	373	−168
South Africa	9	0	9	0	0%	99	431	−332
Spain	3	3	0	0	100%	152	62	+92
Tahiti	1	1	0	0	100%	33	11	+22
Tonga	71	39	28	4	54.93%	1,350	1,075	+275
United States	9	6	3	0	66.67%	187	170	+17
Uruguay	1	1	0	0	100%	60	13	+47
Wales	10	4	6	0	40%	180	235	−55
West Germany	1	1	0	0	100%	54	9	+45
Zimbabwe	1	1	0	0	100%	43	7	+36
Total	286	129	146	11	45.1%	6,146	6,361	−215

=== World Cup record ===
Rugby World Cup record									Qualification						
Year	Round	Pld	W	D	L	PF	PA	Squad	Pos	Pld	W	D	L	PF	PA
(New Zealand) (Australia) 1987	Not invited								Not invited						
(England) (France) (Ireland) (Scotland) (Wales) 1991	Quarter-finals	4	2	0	2	60	72	Squad	1st	3	3	0	0	123	21
(South Africa) 1995	Quarter-finals	4	2	0	2	110	130	Squad	Automatically qualified						
(Wales) 1999	QF play-offs	4	2	0	2	117	107	Squad	3rd	3	1	0	2	59	71
(Australia) 2003	Pool stage	4	2	0	2	138	117	Squad	2nd	4	3	0	1	96	58
(France) 2007	Pool stage	4	2	0	2	69	143	Squad	1st	4	3	0	1	133	78
(New Zealand) 2011	Pool stage	4	2	0	2	91	49	Squad	P/O	2	2	0	0	188	19
(England) 2015	Pool stage	4	1	0	3	69	124	Squad	Automatically qualified						
(Japan) 2019	Pool stage	4	1	0	3	58	128	Squad	P/O	6	3	0	3	167	132
(France) 2023	Pool stage	4	1	0	3	92	75	Squad	P/O	2	2	0	0	79	28
(Australia) 2027	Qualified								P/O	8	2	2	4	175	182
(United States) 2031	To be determined														
Total	—	36	15	0	21	804	977	—	—	32	19	2	11	990	572
Champions; Runners–up; Third place; Fourth place; Home venue

In one of the scenes of the feature film, Invictus, Western Samoa can be seen playing South Africa in the 1995 Rugby World Cup.

=== Pacific Nations Cup ===
Samoa previously competed in the Pacific Tri-Nations winning 11 tournaments. The Pacific Nations Cup replaced the Tri-Nations tournament in 2006. Samoa have won four tournaments.

Tournament	Won	Drawn	Lost	Samoa finish
2006	2	0	2	2nd / 5
2007	3	0	2	3rd / 6
2008	2	0	3	3rd / 6
2009	2	0	2	3rd / 5
2010	2	0	1	1st / 4
2011	1	0	2	3rd / 4
2012	3	0	0	1st / 4
2013	—N/a	—N/a	—N/a	DNP
2014	1	1	0	1st / 3
2015	2	1	1	2nd / 6
2016	1	0	1	2nd / 3
2017	0	0	2	3rd / 3
2018	0	0	2	4th / 4
2019	1	0	2	4th / 6
2022	3	0	0	1st / 4
2024	2	0	2	3rd / 6
2025	0	0	3	6th / 6
Total	25	2	24	4 titles

=== Wins against Tier 1 nations ===
Samoa have recorded 17 wins against tier 1 nations. In addition, Samoa drew with Scotland 15–15 on the 18 November 1995 at Murrayfield Stadium, Edinburgh, Scotland.

6 October 1991	Wales	13–16	Samoa	(Wales) Cardiff Arms Park, Cardiff
	Try: I Evans; Emyr; Con: Ring; Pen: Ring	Report	Try: Vaega; Vaifale; Con: Vaea; Pen: Vaea (2)	Attendance: 45,000; Referee: Patrick Robin (France)

13 October 1991	Argentina	12–35	Samoa	(Wales) Sardis Road, Pontypridd
	Try: Teran Nougues; Con: Arbizu; Pen: Arbizu; Laborde	Report	Try: Bachop; Bunce; Lima (2); Tagaloa (2); Con: Vaea (4); Pen: Vaea	Attendance: 8,500

25 June 1994	Samoa	34–9	Wales	(Samoa) Moamoa
	Try: Lam; Lima (2); Con: Kellett (2); Pen: Kellett (5)	Report	Pen: N Jenkins (3)	Referee: Barry Leask (Australia)

27 May 1995	Italy	18–42	Samoa	(South Africa) ABSA Stadium, East London
	Try: Cuttitta; Vaccari; Con: Domínguez; Pen: Domínguez; Drop: Domínguez	Report	Try: Harder (2); Kellett; Lima (2); Tatupu; Con: Kellett (3); Pen: Kellett (2)	Attendance: 12,000; Referee: Joel Dume (France)

30 May 1995	Argentina	26–32	Samoa	(South Africa) ABSA Stadium, East London
	Try: Crexell; Penalty Try; Con: Cilley (2); Pen: Cilley (4)	Report	Try: Harder; Lam; Leaupepe; Con: Kellett; Pen: Kellett (5)	Attendance: 15,000; Referee: Dave Bishop (New Zealand)

12 November 1996	Ireland	25–40	Samoa	(Ireland) Lansdowne Road, Dublin
	Try: Wallace; Con: Mason; Pen: Mason (6)	Report	Try: Leaupepe; Patu; So'oalo; Vaega (2); Con: Va'a (3); Pen: Va'a (3)	Referee: Santiago Borsani (Argentina)

14 October 1999	Wales	31–38	Samoa	(Wales) Millennium Stadium, Cardiff
	Try: Thomas; Penalty Try (2); Con: N Jenkins (2); Pen: N Jenkins (4)	Report	Try: Bachop (2); Falaniko; Lam; Leaega; Con: Leaega (5); Pen: Leaega	Attendance: 72,500; Referee: Ed Morrison (England)

8 July 2000	Samoa	43–24	Italy	(Samoa) Apia Park, Apia
	Try: Lima; Samania; So'oalo; Vaega; Vili; Con: Samania (3); Pen: Samania (4)	Report	Try: Checchinato; Moscardi; Stoica; Con: Pez (3); Drop: Pez	Attendance: 7,500; Referee: Tappe Henning (South Africa)

24 November 2001	Italy	9–17	Samoa	(Italy) Stadio Tommaso Fattori, L'Aquila
	Pen: Domínguez (3)	Report	Try: Fa'atau; Pen: Leaega (2); Vili (2)	Attendance: 8,000; Referee: Robert G. Davies (Wales)

3 December 2005	Argentina	12–28	Samoa	(Argentina) Buenos Aires
	Try: Agulla; Fernández Lobbe; Con: Fernández Miranda	Report	Try: Johnston; Sititi; Tagicakibau; Con: Warren (2); Pen: Warren (2); Drop: Warren	Referee: Nigel Owens (Wales)

17 July 2011	Australia	23–32	Samoa	Stadium Australia, Sydney
	Try: Ioane 37'; Giteau 70'; Con: Giteau (38', 71'); Pen: Giteau (40', 41', 57')	Report	Try: Tuilagi 11'; Williams 28'; Thompson 45'; G Pisi 54'; Con: T Pisi (13', 29', 55'); Pen: T Pisi (3', 65')	Attendance: 29,908; Referee: Marius Jonker (South Africa)

16 November 2012	Wales	19–26	Samoa	(Wales) Millennium Stadium, Cardiff
	Try: Beck 32'; Con: Halfpenny (1/1) 33'; Pen: Halfpenny (4/5) 15', 28', 49', 61'	Report	Try: Autagavaia 1' c G Pisi 46' m Leota 77' m Con: T Pisi (1/3) 2'; Pen: T Pisi (3/6) 40', 56', 65'	Attendance: 44,329; Referee: Pascal Gauzère (France)

8 June 2013	Samoa	27–17	Scotland	(South Africa) Mr Price Kings Park, Durban
	Try: So'oialo 6' c Tuilagi (2) 11' c, 62' c Con: So'oialo (3/3) 8', 13', 64'; Pen: So'oialo (2/3) 53', 69'		Try: Lamont 49' m Pen: Laidlaw (4/5) 10', 18', 31', 41'	Attendance: 9,753; Referee: John Lacey (Ireland)

15 June 2013	Samoa	39–10	Italy	(South Africa) Mbombela Stadium, Nelspruit
	Try: Williams 20' c Leiua 41' m Leota 53' c Tuifu'a 63' c Va'aulu 72' c Con: Williams (3/4) 21', 53', 64'; Anufe (1/1) 73'; Pen: Williams (2/3) 30', 51'		Try: Penalty try 70' c Con: di Bernardo (1/1) 70'; Pen: Orquera (1/3) 27'	Referee: Craig Joubert (South Africa)

14 June 2014	Samoa	15–0	Italy	(Samoa) Apia Park, Apia
14:00 WST (UTC+13)	Pen: T. Pisi (5/7) 10', 24', 30', 47', 69'	Report (In Italian)		Attendance: 7,000; Referee: George Clancy (Ireland)

22 July 2023	Japan	22–24	Samoa	(Japan) Sapporo Dome, Sapporo
14:50 JST (UTC+09)	Try: Fakatava 6' c Con: Lee Seung-sin (1/1) 7'; Pen: Lee Seung-sin (5/5) 19', 42', 47', 57', 61'		Try: Motuga 37' c Taumateine 48' c Manu 63' c Con: Leali'ifano (3/3) 38', 50', 64'; Pen: Leali'ifano (1/1) 25'	Attendance: 22,063; Referee: Mathieu Raynal (France)

5 July 2024	Samoa	33–25	Italy	(Samoa) Apia Park, Apia
17:00 AST (UTC+13)	Try: Taramai 9' c Ah Wong 30' m Toala 58' c Moleli 77' m Con: Leuila (2/3) 10', 59'; Pen: Leuila (3/3) 43', 50', 69'		Try: Ioane 16' m Lynagh 20' c Garbisi 45' c Con: Garbisi (2/3) 21', 46'; Pen: Garbisi (2/3) 14', 36'	Referee: Paul Williams (New Zealand)

== Players ==
=== Current squad ===
On 8 October, Samoa named a 30-player squad ahead of the 2026 World Rugby Nations Cup European-African-Asian Series.

- Caps updated: 14 November 2026 (after Portugal v Samoa)

Head coach: Tusi Pisi

Note: Flags indicate national union for the club/province as defined by World Rugby.

Player	Position	Date of birth (age)	Caps	Club/province
Richie Asiata	Hooker	3 May 1996 (age 30)	4	(England) Leicester Tigers
Sama Malolo	Hooker	19 February 1998 (age 28)	17	(France) Perpignan
Mills Sanerivi	Hooker	31 August 1999 (age 27)	3	(France) Vannes
Michael Alaalatoa	Prop	28 August 1991 (age 35)	29	(Ireland) Munster
Marco Fepulea'i	Prop	25 April 1995 (age 31)	11	(England) Gloucester
Aki Seiuli	Prop	22 December 1992 (age 33)	19	(New Zealand) Otago
Scott Sio	Prop	16 October 1991 (age 35)	4	(Wales) Cardiff
Tietie Tuimauga	Prop	5 August 1993 (age 33)	13	(England) Saracens
Chris Gabriel	Lock	22 February 2000 (age 26)	1	(France) Castres Olympique
Theo McFarland	Lock	16 October 1995 (age 31)	27	(England) Saracens
Ben Nee-Nee	Lock	12 May 1993 (age 33)	24	(Japan) Kamaishi Seawaves
Sam Slade	Lock	28 August 1997 (age 29)	20	(Japan) Sayama Secom Rugguts
Miracle Faiʻilagi	Back row	31 August 1999 (age 27)	11	(Japan) JR East Green Warriors Tokatsu
Akira Ioane	Back row	16 June 1995 (age 31)	1	(Japan) Hanazono Kintetsu Liners
Niko Jones	Back row	22 July 2000 (age 26)	7	(New Zealand) Waitemata
Alamanda Motuga	Back row	11 September 1994 (age 32)	19	(New Zealand) Counties Manukau
Abraham Papali'i	Back row	20 June 1993 (age 33)	9	(France) Castres Olympique
Joel Lam	Scrum-half	17 May 2002 (age 24)	7	(New Zealand) Otago
Efeso Tavita	Scrum-half		0	(Samoa) Laumoso’oi Siumu
Connor Tupai	Scrum-half	8 December 1999 (age 26)	12	(Australia) Eastern Suburbs
Josh Ioane	Fly-half	11 July 1995 (age 31)	2	(Ireland) Connacht
Jacob Umaga	Fly-half	8 July 1998 (age 28)	7	(Italy) Benetton
Lalomilo Lalomilo	Centre	12 February 1999 (age 27)	9	(France) Grenoble
Irae Simone	Centre	10 July 1995 (age 31)	0	(Japan) Maruwa
Duncan Paia'aua	Centre	20 January 1995 (age 31)	17	(France) Biarritz Olympique
Peter Umaga-Jensen	Centre	31 December 1997 (age 28)	5	(Japan) Hanazono Kintetsu Liners
Latrell Smiler-Ah Kiong	Wing		11	(Australia) Two Blues
AJ Lam	Wing	29 July 1998 (age 28)	2	(France) Clermont Auvergne
Etene Nanai-Seturo	Wing	20 August 1999 (age 27)	0	(France) Clermont Auvergne
Shaun Stevenson	Fullback	14 November 1996 (age 30)	2	(Japan) Kubota Spears

== Player records ==
=== Most caps ===
#	Player	Pos	Span	Mat	Start	Sub	Won	Lost	Draw	%
1	Brian Lima	Wing	1991–2007	65	62	3	32	31	2	50.76
2	To'o Vaega	Centre	1986–2001	61	56	5	35	25	1	58.19
3	Semo Sititi	Flanker	1999–2009	59	50	9	33	26	0	55.93
4	Census Johnston	Prop	2005–2017	57	43	14	25	31	1	44.73
5	David Lemi	Wing	2004–2017	54	46	8	21	31	2	40.74
6	Jack Lam	Flanker	2013-2022	44	39	5	14	28	2	41.66
6	Zak Taulafo	Prop	2009–2016	44	39	5	20	22	2	47.72
8	Opeta Palepoi	Lock	1998–2005	43	30	13	24	19	0	55.81
9	Tusi Pisi	Fly-half	2011–2019	42	38	4	15	26	1	36.90
9	Ofisa Treviranus	Flanker	2009–2018	42	32	15	17	24	1	41.66

Last updated: United States vs Samoa, 21 September 2024. Statistics include officially capped matches only.

=== Most tries ===
#	Player	Pos	Span	Mat	Start	Sub	Pts	Tries
1	Brian Lima	Wing	1991–2007	65	62	3	140	29
2	Alesana Tuilagi	Wing	2002–2015	37	35	2	90	18
3	Semo Sititi	Flanker	1999–2009	59	50	9	85	17
4	Afato So'oalo	Wing	1996–2001	20	18	2	80	16
5	Lome Fa'atau	Wing	2000–2007	35	31	4	70	14
5	To'o Vaega	Centre	1986–2001	61	56	5	79	14
7	David Lemi	Wing	2004–2017	54	46	8	65	13
8	Ed Fidow	Wing	2018–2023	21	16	5	60	12
9	George Leaupepe	Centre	1995–2005	26	23	3	50	10
10	Tupo Fa'amasino	Centre	1988–1996	20	20	0	52	9
10	Alapati Leiua	Centre	2013–2024	36	33	3	45	9
10	Elvis Seveali'i	Centre	2000–2007	20	16	4	45	9

Last updated: United States vs Samoa, 21 September 2024. Statistics include officially capped matches only.

=== Most points ===
#	Player	Pos	Span	Mat	Pts	Tries	Conv	Pens	Drop
1	Tusi Pisi	Fly-half	2011–2019	42	245	2	29	57	2
2	Earl Va'a	Fly-half	1996–2003	28	174	3	33	31	0
3	Silao Leaega	Fullback	1997–2002	19	145	2	21	31	0
4	Brian Lima	Wing	1991–2007	65	140	29	0	0	0
5	Darren Kellett	Fly-half	1993–1995	13	137	2	14	31	2
6	Roger Warren	Fly-half	2004–2008	12	119	0	13	29	2
7	D'Angelo Leuila	Fly-half	2016-	29	106	2	21	16	2
7	Gavin Williams	Centre	2007–2010	16	106	5	18	15	0
9	Tanner Vili	Fly-half	1999–2006	31	99	4	20	13	0
10	Alesana Tuilagi	Wing	2002–2015	37	90	18	0	0	0

Last updated: United States vs Samoa, 21 September 2024. Statistics include officially capped matches only.

=== Most matches as captain ===
#	Player	Pos	Span	Mat	Won	Lost	Draw	%	Pts	Tries
1	Semo Sititi	Flanker	2000–2007	39	19	20	0	48.71	45	9
2	Pat Lam	Number 8	1995–1999	23	8	13	2	39.13	10	2
3	David Lemi	Wing	2012–2017	21	9	10	2	47.61	35	7
4	Peter Fatialofa	Prop	1990–1995	16	11	5	0	68.75	9	2
5	Theo McFarland	Lock	2024-	14	9	4	1	64.29	15	3
6	Michael Alaalatoa	Prop	2019-2024	13	8	4	1	61.54	0	0
6	Mahonri Schwalger	Hooker	2009–2011	13	5	8	0	38.46	0	0
8	Chris Vui	Lock	2017–2023	11	4	7	0	37.50	5	1
9	Jack Lam	Flanker	2018–2019	9	1	8	0	12.50	15	3
10	George Stowers	Number 8	2008–2009	7	4	3	0	57.14	10	2

Last updated: Spain vs Samoa, 21 November 2026. Statistics include officially capped matches only.

=== Most points in a match ===
#	Player	Pos	Pts	Tries	Conv	Pens	Drop	Opposition	Venue	Date
1	Jacob Umaga	Fly-half	33	2	10	1	0	Spain	(Spain) Malaga	21/11/2026
2	Gavin Williams	Centre	30	2	10	0	0	Papua New Guinea	(Samoa) Apia	11/07/2009
3	Roger Warren	Fly-half	24	0	0	8	0	Tonga	(Samoa) Apia	29/05/2004
4	Andrew Aiolupo	Fullback	23	1	8	1	0	South Korea	(Japan) Tokyo	08/04/1990
4	Silao Leaega	Fullback	23	1	3	4	0	Japan	(Wales) Wrexham	03/10/1999
4	Toa Samania	Fullback	23	1	3	4	0	Italy	(Samoa) Apia	08/07/2000
7	Darren Kellett	Fly-half	22	0	2	5	1	Tonga	(Samoa) Moamoa	04/06/1994
7	Ahsee Tuala	Fullback	22	2	6	0	0	Germany	(Germany) Heidelberg	14/07/2018
9	To'o Vaega	Centre	21	1	4	3	0	Fiji	(Samoa) Apia	01/06/1991
9	Earl Va'a	Fly-half	21	1	5	2	0	Georgia	(Australia) Perth	19/10/2003
9	Roger Warren	Fly-half	21	0	3	4	1	Fiji	(Samoa) Apia	09/07/2005

Last updated: Spain vs Samoa, 21 November 2026. Statistics include officially capped matches only.

=== Most tries in a match ===
#	Player	Pos	Pts	Tries	Conv	Pens	Drop	Opposition	Venue	Date
1	Elvis Seveali'i	Wing	20	4	0	0	0	Japan	(Samoa) Apia	10/06/2000
1	Alesana Tuilagi	Wing	20	4	0	0	0	Tonga	(Samoa) Apia	02/07/2005
1	Esera Lauina	Wing	20	4	0	0	0	Papua New Guinea	(Samoa) Apia	11/07/2009
1	Robert Lilomaiava	Wing	20	4	0	0	0	Canada	(Wales) Colwyn Bay	09/11/2012
5	Tupo Fa'amasino	Wing	12	3	0	0	0	South Korea	(Japan) Tokyo	08/04/1990
5	Brian Lima	Centre	12	3	0	0	0	Fiji	(Samoa) Apia	01/06/1991
5	Afato So'oalo	Wing	15	3	0	0	0	Tonga	(Samoa) Apia	28/06/1997
5	Dominic Feau'nati	Wing	15	3	0	0	0	Namibia	(Namibia) Windhoek	12/07/2003
5	Mikaele Pesamino	Wing	15	3	0	0	0	Papua New Guinea	(Papua New Guinea) Port Moresby	18/07/2009
5	Alesana Tuilagi	Wing	15	3	0	0	0	Namibia	(New Zealand) Rotorua	14/09/2011
5	Ed Fidow	Wing	15	3	0	0	0	Germany	(Samoa) Apia	30/06/2018
5	Latrell Smiler Ah-Kiong	Wing	15	3	0	0	0	Zimbabwe	(England) Wakefield	07/11/2026

Last updated: Zimbabwe vs Samoa, 7 November 2026. Statistics include officially capped matches only.

== Current Coaches ==
- (Samoa) Tusi Pisi (Head Coach)
- (Samoa) Kane Thompson (Lineout and Skills)
- (Samoa) Census Johnston (Scrum)
- (Australia) Pek Cowan (Forwards)
- (New Zealand) Tai Lavea (Defence)
- (New Zealand) Cory Brown (Technical Advisor)

Period	Name	Nationality
197?–19??	Keli Tuatagaloa	Samoa
198?–198?	Paul Wallwork	Samoa
198?–1988	Richard Cook	New Zealand
1989–1995	Peter Schuster	Samoa
1996–1999	Bryan Williams	New Zealand
2000–2003	John Boe	New Zealand
2004–2007	Michael Jones	New Zealand
2008–2009	Niko Palamo	Samoa
2009–2011	Titimaea Tafua	Samoa
2011	Scott Wisemantel	Australia
2012–2015	Stephen Betham	Samoa
2016–2017	Alama Ieremia	New Zealand
2017–2018	Titimaea Tafua	Samoa
2018–2020	Steve Jackson	New Zealand
2020–2023	Seilala Mapusua	Samoa
2024–2025	Mahonri Schwalger	Samoa
2025–present	Tusi Pisi	Samoa

== New Zealand connection ==
Western Samoa's triumph in the 1991 Rugby World Cup was inspired by their assistant coach Bryan Williams, who was a New Zealand-born (of Samoan descent) All Black great of the 1970s. The 1991 Samoan World Cup team included many New Zealand born or raised players; the catalyst was Auckland prop Peter Fatialofa, who in 1989, became the first major New Zealand-based player to play for Samoa. By the time of the 1991 World Cup several other New Zealand-born Samoans like Pat Lam, Stephen Bachop, Frank Bunce and Apollo Perelini had joined him. New Zealand born players with Samoan parentage have played for Samoa, such as Earl Va'a, Pat Lam and Lome Fa'atau.

The rugby relationship that exists between New Zealand and Samoa is a complex one. Close ties exist between the two countries, these bonds first being formed with the start of mass Polynesian migration to New Zealand in the latter half of the twentieth century. At the 2007 World Cup, there were 14 New Zealand-born players in the Samoan squad. The only team with more foreign born players in their squad was Italy who had 15.

== Strips ==
Manu Samoa play in blue and white uniforms, with the home strip consisting of blue jerseys, white shorts and blue socks and the away kit being with the colours reversed. Since 2007, the flag of Samoa has been featured on the left sleeve and pe'a-like patterns were incorporated into the jerseys. Sponsored logos appear on jerseys for matches other than the Rugby World Cup, where branding, except for equipment manufacturers, is not allowed.

Period	Kit manufacturer	Shirt sponsor
1986–1988	Umbro	No shirt sponsor
1988–1992	Canterbury	No shirt sponsor
1992–1994	Canterbury	Telecom New Zealand
1994–1996	Canterbury	Vailima
1996–1998	Reebok	Vailima
1998	Reebok	Newcall
1999	Adidas	Newcall
1999–2003	Adidas	No shirt sponsor
2004–2005	Puma	No shirt sponsor
2005–2009	Puma	Samoa International Finance Authority
2010–2011	KooGa	Samoa International Finance Authority
2012–2013	BLK	Digicel
2014–2015	Canterbury^b	Cromwell Property Group (front), Redefine Properties (back)
2015	BLK	Cromwell Property Group (front), Redefine Properties (back)
2016	BLK	Bluesky Communications
2016–2017	LE Sportswear	Bluesky Communications
2017	LE Sportswear	Magnum Hire (front),^c Henderson Cars (back) ^c Invest Samoa ^d
2018–2021	BLK	Grey Investment Group
2021	Dynasty Sport^e	
2021-2022	Castore	Grey Investment Group
2022	Castore	Aramis Rugby (front) Samoa IBFC (back)
2023-2024	Macron	
2024-	Samurai Sportswear	
^b Canterbury brand apparel was supplied for the 2014 end-of-year tour.^c Sponsors worn during the Pasifika Challenge double-header.^d Invest Samoa sponsored Samoa during the 2017 end-of-year rugby union tests.^eLakapi Samoa partners with Dynasty Sport and reveals Jersey for the June-July 2021 Test Series.

== See also ==
- Rugby World Cup
- Pacific Tri-Nations
- Pacific Islanders rugby union team
- Samoa national rugby sevens team
- Samoa Rugby Football Union
- Samoa national rugby league team
