= 2009 Air New Zealand Cup statistics =

Rugby union competition statistics

2009 Air NZ Cup Statistics
- Overall
Points Scored	3953
- 43.4 per game
Tries Scored	406
- Team
Most Points For	Hawke's Bay (372)
Fewest Points Against	Southland (189)
Most Tries	Canterbury (40)
- Hawke's Bay (40)
- Wellington (40)
- Player
Most Points	Matt Berquist (156)
Most Tries	Zac Guildford (13)

The 2009 Air New Zealand Cup ran from 30 July to 7 November. This page includes all statistics from the 14 teams during the 13 rounds of the round-robin.

There were 3953 points scored with an average of 43.4 points per game; there also were 406 tries scored.

Hawke's Bay scored the most points with 372 and, along with Canterbury and Wellington, the most tries with 40, while Southland had the best defensive record through the competition with only 189 points scored against them through 13 rounds.

Matt Berquist, from Hawke's Bay, scored the most points out of every player in the competition - with 156 points and an average of 14.2 points through his 11 matches. Zac Guildford scored the most tries this season with 13.

== Overall ==
=== Team ===
The lists showing all statistics for all teams about points, tries and disciplinary cards.

==== Points ====
The table showing how many points scored by each team (white) and how many points each team was scored against them (grey) in the 2009 Air New Zealand Cup Round Robin. Hawke's Bay scored the most points so far with 372 (28.6 points a game), while Southland had the fewest points scored against them with 189 (14.5 points a game).

Team	Points by Round																										Total		AVG	
Team	1		2		3		4		5		6		7		8		9		10		11		12		13		Total		AVG	
Auckland	13	47	16	22	32	13	15	16	29	14	22	18	23	20	14	16	8	12	27	13	10	0	37	14	26	18	272	223	20.9	17.2
Bay of Plenty	19	14	32	9	21	17	32	16	14	29	19	17	12	19	24	13	17	26	19	22	7	28	28	27	24	30	268	267	20.6	20.5
Canterbury	19	22	22	16	46	13	25	21	36	14	17	19	36	16	29	17	31	21	28	17	50	26	27	20	3	9	369	231	28.4	17.8
Counties Manukau	31	36	9	32	15	51	33	21	8	30	19	62	37	21	6	14	19	28	17	28	8	54	14	37	19	22	235	436	18.1	33.5
Hawke's Bay	47	13	13	21	24	24	9	18	28	26	22	30	34	17	32	10	35	30	22	19	54	8	20	27	32	13	372	283	28.6	21.8
Manawatu	36	31	22	30	25	23	19	12	10	12	15	34	20	23	18	25	30	35	15	43	26	50	27	28	42	16	305	362	23.5	27.8
North Harbour	22	19	15	19	9	29	23	26	22	24	13	17	17	34	16	14	28	19	22	33	28	7	13	37	16	42	244	320	18.8	24.6
Northland	14	19	29	16	13	32	26	23	7	29	15	15	21	37	25	18	21	31	16	21	7	41	19	27	13	32	226	341	17.4	26.2
Otago	19	23	19	26	29	9	12	19	29	7	18	22	16	36	10	32	26	17	10	38	29	35	21	0	22	19	260	283	20	21.8
Southland	16	6	26	19	23	25	18	9	24	22	15	15	19	12	14	6	13	32	13	27	41	0	29	13	9	3	260	189	20	14.5
Taranaki	21	9	16	29	24	24	21	33	12	10	17	13	29	16	17	29	14	15	38	10	0	10	13	29	30	24	252	251	19.4	19.3
Tasman	9	21	19	15	51	15	21	25	26	28	34	15	23	9	13	24	12	8	21	16	0	41	0	21	14	22	243	260	18.7	20
Waikato	6	16	30	22	13	46	16	32	30	8	30	22	9	23	23	18	15	14	33	22	35	29	27	19	18	26	285	297	21.9	22.8
Wellington	23	19	21	13	17	21	16	15	14	36	62	19	16	29	18	23	32	13	43	15	41	7	37	13	22	14	362	237	27.8	18.2
	295		289		342		286		289		318		312		259		301		324		336		312		290		3953		43.4	

Overall	For	Against

==== Tries ====
The list of how many tries each team scored in the round robin. Canterbury, Wellington and Hawke's Bay scored the most tries this season with 40 each while Taranaki, North Harbour and Northland scored the fewest with 20 each.

Team	Total	Tries by Round												
Team	Total	1	2	3	4	5	6	7	8	9	10	11	12	13
Auckland	29	1	1	4	2	4	3	2	1	1	3	1	4	2
Bay of Plenty	24	1	3	2	2	1	1	0	3	2	1	1	3	4
Canterbury	40	1	1	5	3	3	1	5	4	3	3	8	3	0
Counties Manukau	30	5	0	2	3	1	3	5	0	3	2	1	2	3
Hawke's Bay	40	5	1	2	0	3	3	5	4	4	1	7	1	4
Manawatu	35	4	3	3	3	1	2	2	0	3	2	4	3	5
North Harbour	20	1	0	0	2	1	1	3	1	3	3	3	1	1
Northland	20	1	2	1	2	1	2	2	3	2	1	1	1	1
Otago	23	2	1	4	2	4	2	1	1	2	1	3	2	1
Southland	28	1	2	3	2	4	3	1	1	1	1	7	2	0
Taranaki	20	2	1	2	2	0	1	2	1	1	4	0	1	3
Tasman	26	0	2	6	2	2	5	2	1	2	2	0	0	2
Waikato	28	0	4	1	1	3	3	0	2	0	4	4	4	2
Wellington	40	2	2	1	2	2	9	1	0	4	7	5	4	1
	406	26	23	36	28	30	39	31	22	31	35	45	31	29

Team and Round Total
Overall Total

==== Competition Points ====
List of how many competitions points each team scored with overall and week totals.

Team	Total	Points by Round												
Team	Total	1	2	3	4	5	6	7	8	9	10	11	12	13
Auckland	39	0	1	5	1	5	4	4	1	1	4	4	5	4
Bay of Plenty	32	4	4	4	4	0	4	1	4	0	1	0	4	2
Canterbury	47	1	4	5	4	4	1	5	5	4	4	5	4	1
Counties Manukau	12	2	0	0	4	0	0	5	0	0	0	0	0	1
Hawke's Bay	41	5	0	2	0	4	0	5	5	5	4	5	1	5
Manawatu	24	5	0	4	4	1	0	1	1	1	0	1	1	5
North Harbour	20	4	1	0	1	1	1	0	4	4	0	4	0	0
Northland	16	1	4	0	4	0	2	0	4	0	1	0	0	0
Otago	27	1	1	5	1	5	1	0	0	4	0	1	4	3
Southland	41	4	4	1	4	5	2	4	4	0	0	5	4	4
Taranaki	28	4	0	2	0	4	4	4	0	1	5	0	0	4
Tasman	28	0	4	5	1	1	5	4	0	4	4	0	0	0
Waikato	36	0	5	0	0	4	4	0	4	4	5	5	5	0
Wellington	43	4	4	1	4	0	5	0	1	5	5	5	5	4
	433	35	32	34	32	34	33	33	33	33	33	34	33	34

==== Disciplinary cards ====
List of teams whose players received yellow and/or red cards. Bay of Plenty were issued the most cards with 5 while North Harbour were issued the only red card of the season.

Team	Total		Cards by Round												
Team	Yellow card	Red card	1	2	3	4	5	6	7	8	9	10	11	12	13
Auckland	2	0	0	0	0	0	0	0	1	0	0	0	0	0	1
Bay of Plenty	5	0	1	0	0	0	0	0	0	2	1	1	0	0	0
Canterbury	1	0	0	1	0	0	0	0	0	0	0	0	0	0	0
Counties Manukau	1	0	0	0	0	0	1	0	0	0	0	0	0	0	0
Hawke's Bay	4	0	0	0	1	0	0	0	0	1	1	0	0	0	1
Manawatu	3	0	0	0	0	0	0	0	0	1	1	0	1	0	0
North Harbour	1	1	0	0	0	0	0	0	0	0	1	0	1	0	0
Northland	3	0	1	0	0	0	0	1	0	0	0	0	0	0	1
Otago	1	0	0	0	0	0	0	0	0	0	0	0	0	1	0
Southland	1	0	0	0	0	0	0	0	1	0	0	0	0	0	0
Taranaki	3	0	0	1	1	0	1	0	0	0	0	0	0	0	0
Tasman	2	0	0	0	0	0	0	0	0	1	0	0	0	1	0
Waikato	3	0	0	0	1	0	0	0	0	1	0	0	1	0	0
Wellington	3	0	0	1	0	0	0	0	1	0	1	0	0	0	0
	33	1	2	3	3	0	2	1	3	6	4 1	1	3	2	3

Team and Round Total
Overall Total

=== Player ===
The list of the top players who have scored the most points and tries in the 2009 Air New Zealand Cup. There were 3,953 points including 406 tries scored with a total of 218 players scoring them, Matt Berquist leads them all with 156 points and an average of 14.2 points per game. There have also been 33 yellow cards and 1 red card issued.

==== Top Ten Points Scorers ====
A total of 218 players from each team scored points in the round robin, Matt Berquist has scored the most with 156 and average of 14.2 points per game.

Player	Team	Total	AVG	Points per Round													Details
Player	Team	Total	AVG	1	2	3	4	5	6	7	8	9	10	11	12	13	Details
Matt Berquist	Hawke's Bay	156	14.2	22	8	14	9	13	DNP	DNP	12	15	17	19	15	12	34 pen; 2 dg; 24 con
Mike Delany	Bay of Plenty	149	12.4	14	17	11	22	9	14	12	9	7	19	2	13	DNP	1 try; 38 pen; 15 con
Lachlan Munro	Northland	146	11.2	9	24	8	21	2	5	16	10	11	11	2	14	13	4 try; 32 pen; 15 con
Callum Bruce	Waikato	125	9.6	6	10	8	11	18	15	9	13	12	13	0	0	8	1 try; 30 pen; 15 con
Willie Ripia	Taranaki	115	10.5	11	DNP	DNP	9	9	5	19	12	9	18	0	8	15	1 try; 29 pen; 1 dg; 10 con
Robbie Robinson	Southland	111	10.1	11	16	8	6	DNP	DNP	14	9	8	8	6	16	9	29 pen; 12 con
Michael Harris	North Harbour	108	10.8	17	15	0	13	DNP	DNP	DNP	11	13	7	13	8	11	28 pen; 12 con
Andrew Goodman	Tasman	106	8.4	3	3	19	11	16	9	5	8	7	11	0	0	4	2 try; 19 pen; 1 dg; 18 con
Daniel Carter	Canterbury	98	16.3	14	22	19	DNP	21	DNP	DNP	DNP	DNP	DNP	5	17	DNP	3 try; 21 pen; 10 con
Daniel Kirkpatrick	Wellington	95	8.6	6	8	6	0	0	18	11	18	12	4	12	DNP	DNP	1 try; 20 pen; 15 con

==== Top Try Scorers ====
A total of 218 players have scored a total of 406 tries. Zac Guildford has scored the most tries by a player this season with 13.

Player	Team	Total	Tries by Round												
Player	Team	Total	1	2	3	4	5	6	7	8	9	10	11	12	13
Zac Guildford	Hawke's Bay	13	1	0	0	0	1	1	2	0	3	1	3	1	DNP
Hosea Gear	Wellington	11	1	1	0	1	1	4	DNP	DNP	DNP	DNP	2	1	0
Sean Maitland	Canterbury	8	1	0	0	1	0	0	0	2	2	2	0	0	0
Ben Smith	Otago	6	0	0	1	1	1	0	0	0	2	0	1	0	DNP
Jared Payne	Northland	6	0	0	1	1	1	2	0	1	0	0	1	0	0
Jason Hona	Bay of Plenty	5	0	2	0	0	0	0	0	0	0	0	0	1	2
Jason Shoemark	Hawke's Bay	5	0	0	1	0	1	0	0	2	0	0	1	0	0
Sona Taumalolo	Hawke's Bay	5	1	1	0	0	0	0	0	0	1	0	1	0	1
Sosene Anesi	Waikato	5	0	1	0	0	0	1	0	1	0	0	0	2	0
Many		4	Various												

==== Top Goal Kickers ====
Mathew Berquist leads all goal kickers this season with 82.2% success rate.

		Conversions		Pen. Kicks		Drop Goals		
Player	Team	Att.	Comp.	Att.	Comp.	Att.	Comp.	Percentage
Matt Berquist	Hawke's Bay	31	24	38	34	4	2	82.2%
Daniel Kirkpatrick	Wellington	16	15	29	20	0	0	77.8%
Daniel Carter	Canterbury	12	10	28	21	0	0	77.5%
Glenn Dickson	Otago	10	6	23	20	1	0	76.5%
Piri Weepu	Wellington	0	0	3	3	1	0	75.0%
Mike Delany	Bay of Plenty	20	15	51	38	0	0	74.6%
Michael Harris	North Harbour	15	12	37	28	3	0	72.7%
Callum Bruce	Waikato	20	15	41	30	1	0	72.6%
Isaac Thompson	Manawatu	14	12	22	14	0	0	72.2%
Andrew Goodman	Tasman	23	18	29	19	2	1	70.4%

==== Disciplinary Cards ====
The list of all players who have received a yellow or red card in the 2009 Air New Zealand Cup. Luke Braid and Colin Bourke, both from Bay of Plenty are the players who received the most disciplinary cards with two yellows each.

Player	Team	Total		Cards by Round												
Player	Team	Yellow card	Red card	1	2	3	4	5	6	7	8	9	10	11	12	13
Colin Bourke	Bay of Plenty	2	0	0	0	0	0	0	0	0	1	0	1	0	0	0
Luke Braid	Bay of Plenty	2	0	0	0	0	0	0	0	0	1	1	DNP	DNP	0	0
Adam Whitelock	Canterbury	1	0	0	1	0	0	0	0	0	0	DNP	DNP	DNP	DNP	DNP
Alex Ainley	Tasman	1	0	DNP	0	0	0	0	0	0	0	0	0	0	1	0
Andrew Mailei	North Harbour	0	1	0	0	0	0	0	0	0	0	1	DNP	DNP	0	0
Anthony Perenise	Wellington	1	0	0	0	0	DNP	0	0	DNP	0	1	0	0	0	0
Ash Dixon	Hawke's Bay	1	0	0	0	0	0	0	0	0	0	0	0	0	0	1
Brent Thompson	Manawatu	1	0	DNP	0	0	0	0	DNP	0	0	0	0	1	0	0
Bronson Murray	Northland	1	0	1	0	0	0	0	0	0	0	0	0	0	DNP	DNP
Craig Clarke	Taranaki	1	0	0	0	0	0	1	0	0	0	0	0	0	0	0
Daniel Ramsey	Wellington	1	0	0	0	0	0	0	0	1	0	0	0	0	0	0
Filo Paulo	North Harbour	1	0	0	0	0	0	0	0	0	0	0	0	1	0	0
Hamish Paterson	Auckland	1	0	0	0	DNP	0	0	0	1	0	0	DNP	DNP	DNP	0
Hosea Gear	Wellington	1	0	0	1	0	0	0	0	DNP	DNP	DNP	DNP	0	0	0
James Goode	Manawatu	1	0	0	0	0	0	0	0	0	0	1	0	0	0	0
Jamie Mackintosh	Southland	1	0	0	0	0	0	0	0	1	DNP	0	0	0	0	0
Jarrad Hoeata	Taranaki	1	0	0	0	1	0	0	0	0	0	0	0	0	0	0
Joel McKenty	Northland	1	0	0	0	0	0	0	1	0	0	0	0	0	DNP	DNP
Johnny Leota	Manawatu	1	0	0	0	0	0	0	0	0	1	0	0	0	0	0
Jordan Smiler	Waikato	1	0	0	0	1	DNP	0	DNP	0	0	0	0	0	0	0
Kahn Fotuali'i	Tasman	1	0	0	0	0	0	0	0	0	1	0	0	DNP	DNP	0
Karl Haitana	Northland	1	0	0	0	0	0	0	0	0	0	0	0	0	0	1
Liam Messam	Waikato	1	0	0	0	0	0	0	0	0	0	0	0	1	0	DNP
Mark Burman	Bay of Plenty	1	0	1	0	0	0	0	0	0	0	0	0	0	0	0
Matt Egan	Hawke's Bay	1	0	0	0	0	0	0	0	0	0	1	0	0	0	0
Peter Mirrieless	Otago	1	0	0	0	0	0	0	0	0	0	0	0	0	1	0
Peter Saili	Auckland	1	0	0	0	0	0	0	0	0	0	0	0	0	0	1
Ross Kennedy	Hawke's Bay	1	0	0	0	0	0	0	0	0	1	0	0	0	0	0
Save Tokula	Waikato	1	0	0	0	0	0	0	0	0	1	0	DNP	DNP	0	0
Scott Waldrom	Taranaki	1	0	DNP	1	0	DNP	0	0	0	0	DNP	DNP	DNP	DNP	DNP
Sherwin Stowers	Counties Manukau	1	0	0	0	0	0	1	0	0	0	0	0	0	0	0
Sona Taumalolo	Hawke's Bay	1	0	0	0	1	0	0	0	0	0	0	0	0	0	0

== Individual Team Statistics ==
The lists showing each teams; points scorers, try scorers, goal kickers and disciplinary card recipients where available.

=== Auckland ===
Auckland scored 272 total points this season including 29 tries. Ash Moeke led them with 75 points scored through 13 games with an average of 5.8 points per game while Joe Rokocoko and Paul Williams led the try scorers with 4 tries each. Flanker Hamish Paterson and Peter Saili were the only players in the Auckland squad to receive a yellow card, which was in round 7 and round 13.

2009 Auckland Provincial Squad
Props: Paea Fa'anunu; Charlie Faumuina; Tevita Mailau; Pauliasi Manu; John Afoa; Hookers: Tom McCartney; Pat Leafa; Francis Smith; Locks: Kurtis Haiu; Andrew Van der Heijden; Jay Williams	Loose forwards: Dean Budd; Hamish Paterson; Peter Saili; Chris Lowrey; Onosai Tololima Auva'a; Jerome Kaino; Daniel Faleafa; Halfbacks: Grayson Hart; Taniela Moa; Auvasa Faleali'i	Midfielders: Daniel Bowden; Ash Moeke; Jamie Helleur; Gareth Arlidge; Teddy Stanaway; Benson Stanley (c); Winston Stanley; Back Three-Quarters: Atieli Pakalani; Dave Thomas; Isaia Toeava; Chay Raui; Paul Williams; Joe Rokocoko	Coaches: Mark Anscombe (Head); Andrew Strawbridge (Asst.); Most players are capable of playing; multiple positions.: Squad only include players who; have been named in a starting 15 or reserves bench.

==== Points ====
Player	Total	AVG	Points per Round													Details
Player	Total	AVG	1	2	3	4	5	6	7	8	9	10	11	12	13	Details
Ash Moeke	75	5.8	0	11	12	3	0	0	0	3	3	12	5	10	16	19 pen; 9 con
Daniel Bowden	60	8.6	13	0	DNP	7	14	7	13	6	DNP	DNP	DNP	DNP	DNP	3 try; 9 pen; 9 con
Joe Rokocoko	20	4	DNP	DNP	10	DNP	10	DNP	DNP	DNP	DNP	DNP	0	0	0	4 try
Paul Williams	20	1.7	0	5	DNP	0	5	0	0	5	0	0	0	5	0	4 try
Taniela Moa	15	1.4	0	0	DNP	5	0	0	0	0	DNP	10	0	0	0	3 try
Jamie Helleur	10	0.9	0	DNP	DNP	0	0	0	5	0	0	0	0	0	5	2 try
Onosai’i Auva’a	10	0.9	0	0	0	0	DNP	0	0	0	DNP	0	5	5	0	2 try
Peter Saili	10	0.4	0	0	0	0	0	0	0	0	0	5	0	5	0	2 try
Gareth Arlidge	7	1.4	DNP	DNP	DNP	DNP	DNP	DNP	DNP	DNP	0	0	0	7	0	1 pen; 2 con
Atelia Pakalani	5	0.5	0	0	0	DNP	DNP	0	5	0	0	0	0	0	0	1 try
Auvasa Faleali'i	5	0.6	DNP	DNP	5	DNP	0	DNP	0	0	0	0	0	0	0	1 try
Benson Stanley	5	0.4	0	0	0	0	0	5	0	0	0	0	0	DNP	0	1 try
Charlie Faumuina	5	1.3	0	DNP	DNP	0	DNP	DNP	DNP	DNP	0	DNP	DNP	DNP	5	1 try
Dave Thomas	5	0.7	0	0	5	0	0	0	0	DNP	DNP	DNP	DNP	DNP	DNP	1 try
Jerome Kaino	5	1	DNP	DNP	0	DNP	0	DNP	DNP	DNP	DNP	0	0	5	DNP	1 try
Kurtis Haiu	5	0.4	0	0	0	0	0	5	0	0	0	0	0	0	0	1 try
Pat Leafa	5	1	DNP	DNP	DNP	DNP	DNP	DNP	DNP	0	5	0	0	0	0	1 try
Tevita Mailau	5	0.5	0	0	DNP	0	DNP	5	0	0	0	0	0	0	0	1 try
	272	20.9	13	16	32	15	29	22	23	14	8	27	10	37	26	29 try; 29 pen; 20 con

==== Tries ====
Player	Total	Points per Round												
Player	Total	1	2	3	4	5	6	7	8	9	10	11	12	13
Joe Rokocoko	4	DNP	DNP	2	DNP	2	DNP	DNP	DNP	DNP	DNP	0	0	0
Daniel Bowden	3	1	0	DNP	1	1	0	0	0	DNP	DNP	DNP	DNP	DNP
Paul Williams	4	0	1	DNP	0	1	0	0	1	0	0	0	1	0
Taniela Moa	3	0	0	DNP	1	0	0	0	0	DNP	2	0	0	0
Jamie Helleur	2	0	DNP	DNP	0	0	0	1	0	0	0	0	0	1
Onosa'i Auva'a	2	0	0	0	0	DNP	0	0	0	DNP	0	1	1	0
Peter Saili	2	0	0	0	0	0	0	0	0	0	1	0	1	0
Atelia Pakalani	1	0	0	0	DNP	DNP	0	1	0	0	0	0	0	0
Auvasa Faleali'i	1	DNP	DNP	1	DNP	0	DNP	0	0	0	0	0	0	0
Benson Stanley	1	0	0	0	0	0	1	0	0	0	0	0	DNP	0
Charlie Faumuina	1	0	DNP	DNP	0	DNP	DNP	DNP	DNP	0	DNP	DNP	DNP	1
Dave Thomas	1	0	0	1	0	0	0	0	DNP	DNP	DNP	DNP	DNP	DNP
Jerome Kaino	1	DNP	DNP	0	DNP	0	DNP	DNP	DNP	DNP	0	0	1	DNP
Kurtis Haiu	1	0	0	0	0	0	1	0	0	0	0	0	0	0
Pat Leafa	1	DNP	DNP	DNP	DNP	DNP	DNP	DNP	0	1	0	0	0	0
Tevita Mailau	1	0	0	DNP	0	DNP	1	0	0	0	0	0	0	0
	29	1	1	4	2	4	3	2	1	1	3	1	4	2

==== Goal Kicking ====
	Conversions		Pen. Kicks		Drop Goals		
Player	Att.	Comp.	Att.	Comp.	Att.	Comp.	Percentage
Gareth Arlidge	3	2	1	1	0	0	75.0%
Daniel Bowden	11	9	14	9	2	0	66.7%
Ash Moeke	14	9	26	19	1	0	68.3%
Gareth Arlidge	1	0	0	0	0	0	0%
Paul Williams	1	0	0	0	0	0	0%

==== Disciplinary Cards ====
Player	Total	Cards per Round												
Player	Total	1	2	3	4	5	6	7	8	9	10	11	12	13
Hamish Paterson	1	0	0	DNP	0	0	0	1	0	0	DNP	DNP	DNP	0
Peter Saili	1	0	0	0	0	0	0	0	0	0	0	0	0	1
	2	0	0	0	0	0	0	1	0	0	0	0	0	1

=== Bay of Plenty ===
Bay of Plenty scored a total of 268 points through 13 games with an average of 20.6 points per game. Mike Delany scored the most of these points with 149 and an average of 12.4 points a game. They also scored 24 tries, and were issued five disciplinary cards, also most throughout the competition.

2009 Bay of Plenty Provincial Squad
Props: Josh Hohneck; James McGougan; Ted Tauroa; Daniel Schuster; Kane Hames; Joe Savage; Hookers: John Pareanga; Dean Elmiger; Locks: John Moore; Culum Retallick; Josh Katene; Josh Olsen; Mark Burman	Loose forwards: Solomon King; Luke Braid; Matt Henwood; Colin Bourke (c); Matt Vant Leven; Tanerau Latimer; Halfbacks: Junior Polulealigaga; Josh Hall	Midfielders: Mike Delany; Cory Aporo; Phil Burleigh; Wayne Hughson; Back Three-Quarters: Jason Hona; Nigel Hunt; Clinton Toopi; Zar Lawrence; Ben Smith; Sikeli Bola; Toby Arnold; Nick McCashin	Coaches: Sean Horan (Head); Steve Miln (Asst.); Most players are capable of playing; multiple positions.: Squad only include players who; have been named in a starting 15 or reserves bench.

==== Points ====
Player	Total	AVG	Points per Round													Details
Player	Total	AVG	1	2	3	4	5	6	7	8	9	10	11	12	13	Details
Mike Delany	149	12.4	14	17	11	22	9	14	12	9	7	19	2	13	DNP	1 try; 38 pen; 15 con
Jason Hona	25	1.9	0	10	0	0	0	0	0	0	0	0	0	5	10	5 try
Luke Braid	15	1.4	5	0	0	0	0	0	0	0	5	DNP	DNP	5	0	3 try
Phil Burliegh	15	1.2	0	0	0	0	0	5	0	5	0	0	0	5	0	3 try
Cory Aporo	10	0.9	0	0	10	0	0	0	0	0	0	0	0	DNP	DNP	2 try
Culum Retallick	10	0.8	0	0	0	0	0	0	0	0	5	0	5	0	0	2 try
Junior Poluleuligaga	10	0.8	0	0	0	5	0	0	0	5	0	0	0	0	0	2 try
Nigel Hunt	10	0.8	0	5	0	0	5	0	0	0	0	0	0	0	0	2 try
Colin Bourke	9	0.7	0	0	0	0	0	0	0	5	0	0	0	0	4	1 try; 2 con
John Moore	5	0.4	0	0	0	0	0	0	0	0	0	0	0	0	5	1 try
Solomon King	5	0.7	0	0	0	5	0	0	DNP	0	DNP	DNP	DNP	DNP	DNP	1 try
Zar Lawrence	5	0.4	0	0	0	0	0	0	DNP	0	0	0	0	0	5	1 try
	268	20.6	19	32	21	26	14	19	12	24	17	19	7	28	24	24 try; 38 pen; 17 con

==== Tries ====
Player	Total	Tries per Round												
Player	Total	1	2	3	4	5	6	7	8	9	10	11	12	13
Jason Hona	5	0	2	0	0	0	0	0	0	0	0	0	1	2
Luke Braid	3	1	0	0	0	0	0	0	0	1	DNP	DNP	1	0
Phil Burleigh	3	0	0	0	0	0	1	0	1	0	0	0	1	0
Cory Aporo	2	0	0	2	0	0	0	0	0	0	0	0	DNP	DNP
Culum Retallick	2	0	0	0	0	0	0	0	0	1	0	1	0	0
Junior Poluleuligaga	2	0	0	0	1	0	0	0	0	0	0	0	0	0
Nigel Hunt	2	0	1	0	0	1	0	0	0	0	0	0	0	0
Colin Bourke	1	0	0	0	0	0	0	0	1	0	0	0	0	0
John Moore	1	0	0	0	0	0	0	0	0	0	0	0	0	1
Mike Delany	1	0	0	0	0	0	0	0	0	0	1	0	0	DNP
Solomon King	1	0	0	0	1	0	0	DNP	0	DNP	DNP	DNP	DNP	DNP
Zar Lawrence	1	0	0	0	0	0	0	DNP	0	0	0	0	0	1
	24	1	3	2	2	1	1	0	3	2	1	1	3	4

==== Goal Kicking ====
	Conversions		Pen. Kicks		Drop Goals		
Player	Att.	Comp.	Att.	Comp.	Att.	Comp.	Percentage
Mike Delany	20	15	51	38	0	0	74.6%
Colin Bourke	4	2	1	0	1	0	33.3%

==== Disciplinary Cards ====
Player	Total	Cards per Round												
Player	Total	1	2	3	4	5	6	7	8	9	10	11	12	13
Colin Boukre	2	0	0	0	0	0	0	0	1	0	1	0	0	0
Luke Braid	2	0	0	0	0	0	0	0	1	1	DNP	DNP	0	0
Mark Burman	1	1	0	0	0	0	0	0	0	0	0	0	0	0
	5	1	0	0	0	0	0	0	2	1	1	0	0	0

=== Canterbury ===
Canterbury scored 369 points through the round-robin. Daniel Carter scored the most of Canterbury's points, with 98 points and an average of 16.3 points a game. Canterbury also scored 40 tries this season with Sean Maitland scoring the most with 8. Adam Whitelock was the only player to receive a disciplinary card, with a yellow in round 2 against Auckland.

2009 Canterbury Provincial Squad
Props: Wyatt Crockett; Peter Borlase; Andrew Olorenshaw; Owen Franks; Rodney Ah You; Hookers: Corey Flynn; Ti'i Paulo; Steve Fualau; Will Catherwood; Locks: Sam Whitelock; James Broadhurst; Isaac Ross; Luke Ramano; Brad Thorn	Loose forwards: Michael Paterson; George Whitelock (c); Ash Parker; Nasi Manu; Matt Todd; Aaron McCoy; Richie McCaw; Mike Coman; Kieran Read; Halfbacks: Tyson Keats; Willie Heinz; Andy Ellis	Midfielders: Stephen Brett; Ryan Crotty; Adam Whitelock; Casey Laulala; Tim Bateman; Daniel Carter; Back Three-Quarters: Sean Maitland; James Paterson; Colin Slade; Tu Umaga-Marshall; Chris Small	Coaches: Rob Penney (Head); Tabai Matson (Asst.); Most players are capable of playing; multiple positions.: Squad only include players who; have been named in a starting 15 or reserves bench.

==== Points ====
Player	Total	AVG	Points per Round													Details
Player	Total	AVG	1	2	3	4	5	6	7	8	9	10	11	12	13	Details
Daniel Carter	98	16.3	14	22	19	DNP	21	DNP	DNP	DNP	DNP	DNP	5	17	DNP	3 try; 21 pen; 10 con
Stephen Brett	76	6.3	0	0	0	5	0	12	16	9	16	5	10	DNP	3	2 try; 10 pen; 2 dg; 15 con
Sean Maitland	40	3.1	5	0	0	5	0	0	0	10	10	10	0	0	0	8 try
Colin Slade	30	2.7	0	0	7	10	0	0	DNP	DNP	0	8	5	0	0	2 try; 4 pen; 4 con
James Paterson	15	1.3	0	0	0	DNP	0	5	0	5	0	0	0	5	0	3 try
Tu Umaga-Marshall	15	1.9	DNP	DNP	DNP	5	DNP	0	0	5	0	0	5	DNP	0	3 try
Tim Bateman	15	1.2	5	0	0	0	5	0	5	0	0	0	0	0	0	3 try
Corey Flynn	10	1.1	DNP	DNP	DNP	0	5	0	0	0	0	0	5	0	DNP	2 try
Sam Whitelock	10	0.8	0	0	0	0	0	0	0	0	5	0	5	DNP	0	2 try
Kieran Read	10	5	DNP	DNP	0	DNP	DNP	DNP	DNP	DNP	DNP	DNP	10	DNP	DNP	2 try
Adam Whitelock	5	0.6	0	0	5	0	0	0	0	0	DNP	DNP	DNP	DNP	DNP	1 try
Andy Ellis	5	0.6	DNP	DNP	DNP	0	0	0	0	0	0	0	5	0	DNP	1 try
Ash Parker	5	0.8	DNP	DNP	DNP	DNP	DNP	0	5	0	0	0	DNP	0	DNP	1 try
Casey Laulala	5	0.7	DNP	DNP	DNP	DNP	DNP	DNP	5	0	0	0	0	0	0	1 try
George Whitelock	5	0.5	0	0	0	0	5	0	0	DNP	DNP	0	0	0	0	1 try
Michael Paterson	5	0.4	0	0	0	0	0	0	5	0	0	0	DNP	0	0	1 try
Richie McCaw	5	1.7	DNP	DNP	DNP	DNP	0	DNP	DNP	DNP	DNP	DNP	0	5	DNP	1 try
Ti'i Paulo	5	0.4	0	0	0	0	0	0	0	0	0	5	DNP	0	0	1 try
Tyson Keats	5	0.4	0	0	5	0	0	DNP	0	0	0	0	0	0	0	1 try
Wyatt Crockett	5	0.6	0	0	5	0	0	0	DNP	DNP	0	DNP	0	0	DNP	1 try
	369	28.4	19	22	46	25	36	17	36	29	31	28	50	27	3	40 try; 35 pen; 2 dg; 29 con

==== Tries ====
Player	Total	Tries per Round												
Player	Total	1	2	3	4	5	6	7	8	9	10	11	12	13
Sean Maitland	8	1	0	0	1	0	0	0	2	2	2	0	0	0
Daniel Carter	3	0	1	0	DNP	0	DNP	DNP	DNP	DNP	DNP	1	1	DNP
James Paterson	3	0	0	0	DNP	0	1	0	1	0	0	0	1	0
Tim Bateman	3	0	0	1	0	1	0	1	0	0	0	0	0	0
Tu Umaga-Marshall	3	DNP	DNP	DNP	1	DNP	0	0	1	0	0	1	DNP	0
Stephen Brett	2	0	0	0	1	0	0	1	0	0	0	0	DNP	0
Kieran Read	2	DNP	DNP	0	DNP	DNP	DNP	DNP	DNP	DNP	DNP	2	DNP	DNP
Colin Slade	2	0	0	1	0	0	0	DNP	DNP	0	0	1	0	0
Corey Flynn	2	DNP	DNP	DNP	0	1	0	0	0	0	0	1	0	DNP
Sam Whitelock	2	0	0	0	0	0	0	0	0	1	0	1	DNP	0
Andy Ellis	1	DNP	DNP	DNP	0	0	0	0	0	0	0	1	0	DNP
Adam Whitelock	1	0	0	1	0	0	0	0	0	DNP	DNP	DNP	DNP	DNP
Ash Parker	1	DNP	DNP	DNP	DNP	DNP	0	1	0	0	0	DNP	0	DNP
Casey Laulala	1	DNP	DNP	DNP	DNP	DNP	DNP	1	0	0	0	0	0	0
George Whitelock	1	0	0	0	0	1	0	0	DNP	DNP	0	0	0	0
Michael Paterson	1	0	0	0	0	0	0	1	0	0	0	DNP	0	0
Richie McCaw	1	DNP	DNP	DNP	DNP	0	DNP	DNP	DNP	DNP	DNP	0	1	DNP
Ti'i Paulo	1	0	0	0	0	0	0	0	0	0	1	0	0	0
Tyson Keats	1	0	0	1	0	0	DNP	0	0	0	0	0	0	0
Wyatt Crackett	1	0	0	1	0	0	0	DNP	DNP	0	DNP	0	0	DNP
	40	1	1	5	3	3	1	5	4	3	3	8	3	0

==== Goal Kicking ====
	Conversions		Pen. Kicks		Drop Goals		
Player	Att.	Comp.	Att.	Comp.	Att.	Comp.	Percentage
Daniel Carter	12	10	28	21	0	0	77.5%
Colin Slade	7	4	6	4	0	0	61.5%
Stephen Brett	22	15	19	10	7	2	56.3%
Andy Ellis	0	0	0	0	1	0	0%

==== Disciplinary Cards ====
Player	Total	Cards per Round												
Player	Total	1	2	3	4	5	6	7	8	9	10	11	12	13
Adam Whitelock	1	0	1	0	0	0	0	0	0	DNP	DNP	DNP	DNP	DNP
	1	0	1	0	0	0	0	0	0	0	0	0	0	0

=== Counties Manukau ===
Counties Manukau scored 235 total points this season with Tim Nanai-Williams leading them with 70 points, they also scored 30 tries, with Ahsee Tuala and Simon Lemalu leading them with 4 each. Winger Sherwin Stowers is the only player to receive a yellow card.

2009 Counties Manukau Provincial Squad
Props: Kojak Faioso; Poaloi Taula; Graham Dewes; Tuaefe Palelei; Simon Lemalu; Siua Halanukonuka; Hookers: Matt Holloway (Loan); Ilaisa Ma'asi; Cody Martin; Locks: Alepini Olosoni; Jamie Chipman; Rees Logan	Loose forwards: Sikeli Nabou; Mark Selwyn; Viliame Fihaki; DJ Forbes; Fritz Lee; Waka Setetaia; Ryota Asano; Jamie Metcalfe; Halfbacks: Notise Tauafao; August Pulu; Samisoni Fisilau	Midfielders: Josh Hall (Loan); Tasesa Lavea (c); Siale Piutau; Reynold Lee-Lo; Tim Nanai-Williams; Seremaia Tagicakibau; Tekori Luteru; Dean Cummins; Back Three-Quarters: Sherwin Stowers; David Raikuna; Jason Roache; Ahsee Tuala; Lelia Masaga	Coaches: Milton Haig (Head); Andrew Hewetson (Asst.); Most players are capable of playing; multiple positions.: Squad only include players who; have been named in a starting 15 or reserves bench.

==== Points ====
Player	Total	AVG	Points per Round													Details
Player	Total	AVG	1	2	3	4	5	6	7	8	9	10	11	12	13	Details
Tim Nanai-Williams	70	5.4	0	0	2	18	3	4	12	6	0	4	3	14	4	2 try; 10 pen; 15 con
Josh Hall	23	2.9	11	9	3	DNP	DNP	0	DNP	DNP	DNP	0	0	0	0	1 try; 4 pen; 3 con
Ahsee Tuala	20	1.7	5	0	0	5	0	5	0	DNP	5	0	0	0	0	4 try
Simon Lemalu	20	1.8	5	0	0	0	0	0	10	0	DNP	DNP	5	0	0	4 try
Sherwin Stowers	15	1.2	5	0	0	5	0	0	5	0	0	0	0	0	0	3 try
Fritz Lee	10	1	0	0	0	5	0	0	DNP	DNP	0	5	0	0	DNP	2 try
Lelia Masaga	10	1.3	5	0	0	0	0	DNP	5	0	0	DNP	DNP	DNP	DNP	2 try
Mark Selwyn	10	1	0	0	5	0	0	0	0	DNP	0	5	0	DNP	DNP	2 try
Tasesa Lavea	10	1	0	0	0	0	5	DNP	5	0	0	DNP	DNP	0	0	2 try
Dean Cummins	9	1.5	DNP	DNP	DNP	DNP	DNP	5	0	0	4	DNP	DNP	0	0	1 try; 2 con
Samisoni Fisilau	8	1.1	DNP	DNP	0	0	0	DNP	DNP	DNP	5	3	0	DNP	0	1 try; 1 dg
Alepeni Olosoni	5	0.6	DNP	DNP	DNP	DNP	0	0	0	0	0	0	0	0	5	1 try
DJ Forbes	5	0.4	0	DNP	0	0	0	0	0	0	0	0	0	0	5	1 try
Ilaisa Maasi	5	0.6	DNP	DNP	DNP	DNP	DNP	5	0	0	0	0	0	0	0	1 try
Siale Piutau	5	0.6	0	DNP	DNP	DNP	0	DNP	DNP	0	5	0	0	0	0	1 try
Sikeli Nabou	5	1	5	0	0	0	DNP	0	DNP	DNP	DNP	DNP	DNP	DNP	DNP	1 try
Waka Setitaia	5	0.6	DNP	0	0	DNP	DNP	DNP	DNP	0	0	0	0	0	5	1 try
	235	18	31	9	15	33	8	19	37	6	19	17	8	14	19	30 try; 13 pen; 1 dg; 20 con

==== Tries ====
Player	Total	Tries per Round												
Player	Total	1	2	3	4	5	6	7	8	9	10	11	12	13
Ahsee Tuala	4	1	0	0	1	0	1	0	DNP	1	0	0	0	0
Simon Lemalu	4	1	0	0	0	0	0	2	0	DNP	DNP	1	0	0
Sherwin Stowers	3	0	0	1	1	0	0	1	0	0	0	0	0	0
Fritz Lee	2	0	0	0	1	0	0	DNP	DNP	0	1	0	0	DNP
Lelia Masaga	2	1	0	0	0	0	DNP	1	0	0	DNP	DNP	DNP	DNP
Mark Selwyn	2	0	0	1	0	0	0	0	DNP	0	1	0	DNP	DNP
Tasesa Lavea	2	0	0	0	0	1	DNP	1	0	0	DNP	DNP	0	0
Tim Nanai-Williams	2	0	0	0	0	0	0	0	0	0	0	0	2	0
Alepeni Olosoni	1	DNP	DNP	DNP	DNP	0	0	0	0	0	0	0	0	1
Dean Cummins	1	DNP	DNP	DNP	DNP	DNP	1	0	0	0	DNP	DNP	0	0
DJ Forbes	1	0	DNP	0	0	0	0	0	0	0	0	0	0	1
Ilaisa Maasi	1	DNP	DNP	DNP	DNP	DNP	5	0	0	0	0	0	0	0
Josh Hall	1	1	0	0	DNP	DNP	0	DNP	DNP	DNP	0	0	0	0
Samisoni Fisilau	1	DNP	DNP	0	0	0	DNP	DNP	DNP	1	0	0	DNP	0
Siale Piutau	1	0	DNP	DNP	DNP	0	DNP	DNP	0	1	0	0	0	0
Sikeli Nabou	1	1	0	0	0	DNP	0	DNP	DNP	DNP	DNP	DNP	DNP	DNP
Waka Setitaia	1	DNP	0	0	DNP	DNP	DNP	DNP	0	0	0	0	0	1
	30	5	0	2	3	1	3	5	0	3	2	1	2	3

==== Goal Kicking ====
	Conversions		Pen. Kicks		Drop Goals		
Player	Att.	Comp.	Att.	Comp.	Att.	Comp.	Percentage
Samisoni Fisilau	0	0	0	0	1	1	100%
Tim Nanai-Williams	21	15	17	10	0	0	65.8%
Josh Hall	6	3	10	4	1	0	41.2%
Dean Cummins	3	2	3	0	0	0	33.3%
Tasesa Lavea	0	0	0	0	1	0	0%

==== Disciplinary Cards ====
Player	Total	Cards per Round												
Player	Total	1	2	3	4	5	6	7	8	9	10	11	12	13
Sherwin Stowers	1	0	0	0	0	1	0	0	0	0	0	0	0	0
	1	0	0	0	0	1	0	0	0	0	0	0	0	0

=== Hawke's Bay ===
Hawke's Bay scored 372 points this season, most by any other team. Matt Berquist scored the most points with 156, most among players. They also scored 40 tries including the only penalty try of the season; Zac Guildford led them with 13 tries, also most among players. Sona Taumalolo, Ash Dixon, Matt Egan and Ross Kennedy were the only players in the Hawke's Bay team to receive disciplinary cards with yellows in round 3, round 8, round 9 and round 13.

2009 Hawke's Bay Provincial Squad
Props: Faka'anaua Taumalolo; Clint Newland; Josh Keys; Jodi Allen; Hookers: Ash Dixon; Hikawera Elliot; Locks: Matt Egan; Ross Kennedy; Adam Bradey; Hugh Reed; Bryn Evans	Loose forwards: Michael Johnson; Karl Lowe; Thomas Waldrom; George Naoupu; Pama Petia; Halfbacks: Chris Eaton; Dane Shelford; Kilifi Fangupu	Midfielders: Matt Berquist; Sam Giddens; Jason Shoemark (c); Andrew Horrell; Aayden Clarke; Richard Buckman; Back Three-Quarters: Zac Guildford; Nick Thomson; Jason Kupa; Mark Jackman; Israel Dagg	Coaches: Peter Russell (Head); Tom Coventry (Asst.); Most players are capable of playing; multiple positions.: Squad only include players who; have been named in a starting 15 or reserves bench.

==== Points ====
Player	Total	AVG	Points per Round													Details
Player	Total	AVG	1	2	3	4	5	6	7	8	9	10	11	12	13	Details
Mathew Berquist	156	14.2	22	8	14	9	13	DNP	DNP	12	15	17	19	15	12	34 pen; 2 dg; 24 con
Zac Guildford	65	5.4	5	0	0	0	5	5	10	0	15	5	15	5	DNP	13 try
Jason Shoemark	25	1.9	0	0	5	0	5	0	0	10	0	0	5	0	0	5 try
Sam Giddens	21	3	0	0	DNP	DNP	0	7	14	DNP	DNP	DNP	DNP	0	0	1 try; 2 pen; 5 con
Sona Taumalolo	25	1.9	5	5	0	0	0	0	0	0	5	0	5	0	5	5 try
Thomas Waldrom	20	1.7	5	0	0	DNP	0	0	0	0	0	0	10	0	5	4 try
Jason Kupa	15	1.5	5	0	5	0	0	DNP	0	0	0	0	DNP	DNP	5	3 try
Israel Dagg	10	0.8	0	0	0	0	0	0	0	10	0	0	0	0	0	2 try
Karl Lowe	10	0.8	5	0	0	0	0	0	0	0	0	0	0	0	5	2 try
Andrew Horrell	5	0.4	0	0	0	0	0	5	0	0	0	0	0	0	DNP	1 try
Hugh Reed	5	1.7	DNP	DNP	DNP	DNP	DNP	0	5	0	DNP	DNP	DNP	DNP	DNP	1 try
Mark Jackman	5	0.6	DNP	DNP	0	0	0	5	0	0	0	0	0	DNP	DNP	1 try
Matt Egan	5	0.4	0	0	0	0	0	0	5	0	0	0	0	0	0	1 try
Penalty Try	5	-	0	0	0	0	5	0	0	0	0	0	0	0	0	1 try
	372	28.6	47	13	24	9	28	22	34	32	35	22	54	20	32	40 try; 36 pen; 2 dg; 29 con

==== Tries ====
Player	Total	Tries per Round												
Player	Total	1	2	3	4	5	6	7	8	9	10	11	12	13
Zac Guildford	13	1	0	0	0	1	1	2	0	3	1	3	1	DNP
Jason Shoemark	5	0	0	1	0	1	0	0	2	0	0	1	0	0
Sona Taumalolo	5	1	1	0	0	0	0	0	0	1	0	1	0	1
Thomas Waldrom	4	1	0	0	DNP	0	0	0	0	0	0	2	0	1
Jason Kupa	3	1	0	1	0	0	DNP	0	0	0	0	DNP	DNP	1
Israel Dagg	2	0	0	0	0	0	0	0	2	0	0	0	0	0
Karl Lowe	2	1	0	0	0	0	0	0	0	0	0	0	0	1
Andrew Horrell	1	0	0	0	0	0	1	0	0	0	0	0	0	DNP
Hugh Reed	1	DNP	DNP	DNP	DNP	DNP	0	1	0	DNP	DNP	DNP	DNP	DNP
Mark Jackman	1	DNP	DNP	0	0	0	1	0	0	0	0	0	DNP	DNP
Matt Egan	1	0	0	0	0	0	0	1	0	0	0	0	0	0
Sam Giddens	1	0	0	DNP	DNP	0	0	1	DNP	DNP	DNP	DNP	0	0
Penalty Try	1	0	0	0	0	1	0	0	0	0	0	0	0	0
	40	5	1	2	0	3	3	5	4	4	1	7	1	4

==== Goal Kicking ====
	Conversions		Pen. Kicks		Drop Goals		
Player	Att.	Comp.	Att.	Comp.	Att.	Comp.	Percentage
Mathew Berquist	31	24	38	34	4	2	82.2%
Sam Giddens	8	5	2	2	0	0	70.0%
Andrew Horrell	1	0	0	0	0	0	0%
Jason Shoemark	0	0	0	0	1	0	0%

==== Disciplinary Cards ====
Player	Total	Cards by Round												
Player	Total	1	2	3	4	5	6	7	8	9	10	11	12	13
Ash Dixon	1	0	0	0	0	0	0	0	0	0	0	0	0	1
Matt Egan	1	0	0	0	0	0	0	0	0	1	0	0	0	0
Ross Kennedy	1	0	0	0	0	0	0	0	1	0	0	0	0	0
Sona Taumalolo	1	0	0	1	0	0	0	0	0	0	0	0	0	0
	4	0	0	1	0	0	0	0	1	1	0	0	0	1

=== Manawatu ===
Manawatu scored a total of 305 points in the 2009 Air New Zealand Cup. Isaac Thompson led them all with a tally of 71 points and an average of 5.9 a game. Manawatu have scored 35 tries this season, Andre Taylor led them with 3 tries. Johnny Leota, Brent Thompson and James Goode were the only players to receive disciplinary cards.

2009 Manawatu Provincial Squad
Props: Grant Polson; David Te Moana; Talau Hala; Willie Ioane; Ma'afu Fia; Adrian Barone (Loan); Hookers: Sean O'Connor; Rob Foreman; Locks: Mike Fitzgerald; Reece Robinson; James Goode; Lisiate Fa'aoso	Loose forwards: Nick Crosswell; Doug Tietjens; Bertus Mulder; Callum Gibbins; Josh Bradnock (c); Hamish Gosling; Brent Thompson; Halfbacks: Aaron Smith; Steven Treleaven	Midfielders: Aaron Cruden; Johnny Leota; Tevita Taufui; Isaac Thompson; Frank Bryant; Back Three-Quarters: Kurt Baker; Aaron James; Lote Raikabula; Andre Taylor; Casey Stone	Coaches: Dave Rennie (Head); Bruce Hemara (Asst.); Most players are capable of playing; multiple positions.: Squad only include players who; have been named in a starting 15 or reserves bench.

==== Points ====
Player	Total	AVG	Points per Round													Details
Player	Total	AVG	1	2	3	4	5	6	7	8	9	10	11	12	13	Details
Isaac Thompson	71	5.5	0	5	2	0	0	0	10	18	15	3	6	12	0	1 try; 14 pen; 12 con
Aaron Cruden	54	5.4	16	12	12	4	5	5	DNP	0	DNP	0	0	DNP	0	2 try; 8 pen; 10 con
Andre Taylor	37	3.1	0	0	10	0	0	0	0	0	0	0	DNP	0	27	4 try; 2 pen; 1 dg; 4 con
Tomasi Cama	17	2.4	DNP	DNP	0	DNP	DNP	DNP	0	DNP	5	7	0	0	5	3 try; 1 con
Casey Stone	15	1.5	5	0	0	10	0	DNP	0	0	DNP	DNP	0	0	0	3 try
Kurt Baker	15	1.7	0	0	0	5	5	0	0	0	5	DNP	DNP	DNP	DNP	3 try
Tevita Taufui	15	1.3	10	0	0	0	0	0	DNP	0	0	0	5	0	0	3 try
Brent Thompson	10	0.9	DNP	0	0	0	0	DNP	0	0	5	0	0	5	0	2 try
Frank Bryant	10	3.3	5	0	DNP	DNP	DNP	5	DNP	DNP	DNP	DNP	DNP	DNP	DNP	2 try
James Goode	10	0.8	0	0	DNP	0	0	0	0	0	0	0	10	0	0	2 try
Johnny Leota	10	0.8	0	0	0	0	0	0	5	0	0	0	0	0	5	2 try
Lote Raikubula	10	0.8	0	5	DNP	0	0	0	0	0	0	5	0	0	0	2 try
Reece Robinson	10	1.1	DNP	0	0	0	0	5	DNP	DNP	DNP	0	0	5	0	2 try
Aaron James	5	0.6	DNP	DNP	DNP	0	0	0	DNP	0	0	0	5	0	0	1 try
Aaron Smith	5	0.4	0	0	0	0	0	0	5	0	0	0	0	0	0	1 try
Sean O'Connor	5	0.4	0	0	0	0	0	0	0	0	0	0	0	5	-	1 try
	305	23.5	36	22	25	19	10	15	20	18	30	15	26	27	42	35 try; 24 pen; 1 dg; 27 con

==== Tries ====
Player	Total	Tries per Round												
Player	Total	1	2	3	4	5	6	7	8	9	10	11	12	13
Andre Taylor	4	0	0	2	0	0	0	0	0	0	0	DNP	0	2
Casey Stone	3	1	0	0	2	0	DNP	0	0	DNP	DNP	0	0	0
Kurt Baker	3	0	0	0	1	1	0	0	0	1	DNP	DNP	DNP	DNP
Tevita Taufui	3	2	0	0	0	0	0	DNP	0	0	0	1	0	0
Tomasi Cama	3	DNP	DNP	0	DNP	DNP	DNP	0	DNP	1	1	0	0	1
Aaron Cruden	2	0	1	1	0	0	0	DNP	0	DNP	0	0	DNP	0
Brent Thompson	2	DNP	0	0	0	0	DNP	0	0	1	0	0	1	0
Frank Bryant	2	1	0	DNP	DNP	DNP	1	DNP	DNP	DNP	DNP	DNP	DNP	DNP
James Goode	2	0	0	0	0	0	0	0	0	0	0	2	0	0
Lote Raikabula	2	0	1	DNP	0	0	0	0	0	0	1	0	0	0
Reece Robinson	2	DNP	0	0	0	0	1	DNP	DNP	DNP	DNP	0	1	0
Johnny Leota	2	0	0	0	0	0	0	1	0	0	0	0	0	1
Aaron James	1	0	0	0	0	0	0	0	0	0	0	1	0	0
Aaron Smith	1	0	0	0	0	0	0	1	0	0	0	0	0	0
Issac Thompson	1	0	1	0	0	0	0	0	0	0	0	0	0	0
Sean O'Connor	1	0	0	0	0	0	0	0	0	0	0	0	1	0
Rob Foreman	1	0	0	0	0	0	0	0	0	0	0	0	0	1
	35	4	3	3	3	1	2	2	0	3	2	4	3	5

==== Goal Kicking ====
	Conversions		Pen. Kicks		Drop Goals		
Player	Att.	Comp.	Att.	Comp.	Att.	Comp.	Percentage
Tomasi Cama	1	1	0	0	0	0	100%
Isaac Thompson	14	12	22	14	0	0	72.2%
Andre Taylor	5	4	6	2	1	1	58.3%
Aaron Cruden	15	11	19	8	0	0	52.9%

==== Disciplinary Cards ====
Player	Total	Cards by Round												
Player	Total	1	2	3	4	5	6	7	8	9	10	11	12	13
Brent Thompson	1	DNP	0	0	0	0	DNP	0	0	0	0	1	0	0
James Goode	1	0	0	DNP	0	0	0	0	0	1	0	0	0	0
Johnny Leota	1	0	0	0	0	0	0	0	1	0	0	0	0	0
	3	0	0	0	0	0	0	1	1	0	0	1	0	0

=== North Harbour ===
North Harbour scored a total of 244 points this season with an average of 19 points a game, they also scored 20 tries. Michael Harris scored the most points with 108 and an average of 10.8 points a game. North Harbour were issued two disciplinary cards including the only red card of the season, which went to Andrew Mailei in round 9.

2009 North Harbour Provincial Squad
Props: James Afoa; Ben Afeaki; Adrian Smith; Mike Reid; Tony Woodcock; Hookers: James Parsons; Joe Royal; Mike Mayhew; James Hanson; Locks: James King; William Whetton; Filo Paulo; Richard Mayhew; Anthony Boric	Loose forwards: Chris Smith (c); Robbie Colhoun; Scott Uren; Viliame Ma'afu; Malakai Ravulo; Tom Chamberlain; Halfbacks: Chris Smylie; Matt France; Nalu Tuigamala	Midfielders: Michael Harris; Andrew Mailei; George Pisi; Luke McAlister; Ben Botica; Hayden Abercrombie; Back Three-Quarters: Ken Pisi; Anthony Tuitavake; Jack McPhee; Nafi Tuitavake; Rudi Wulf; Josh York	Coaches: Craig Dowd (Head); Jeff Wilson (Asst.); Most players are capable of playing; multiple positions.: Squad only include players who; have been named in a starting 15 or reserves bench.

==== Points ====
Player	Total	AVG	Points per Round													Details
Player	Total	AVG	1	2	3	4	5	6	7	8	9	10	11	12	13	Details
Michael Harris	108	10.8	17	15	0	13	DNP	DNP	DNP	11	13	7	13	8	11	28 pen; 12 con
Ben Botica	32	2.9	0	DNP	DNP	0	22	8	2	0	0	0	0	0	0	1 try; 7 pen; 3 con
Rudi Wulf	15	1.4	DNP	DNP	0	5	0	0	0	0	5	0	0	0	5	3 try
Luke McAlister	14	4.7	DNP	0	9	DNP	DNP	DNP	DNP	DNP	DNP	DNP	5	DNP	DNP	1 try; 3 pen
Anthony Tuitavake	10	1.7	5	0	0	0	DNP	DNP	5	DNP	0	DNP	DNP	DNP	DNP	2 try
George Pisi	10	0.9	0	0	0	0	0	0	5	0	0	5	0	DNP	0	2 try
Nafi Tuitavake	10	1.1	0	0	0	0	0	DNP	DNP	DNP	DNP	5	0	5	0	2 try
Nalu Tuigamala	10	1.4	DNP	DNP	0	0	DNP	DNP	DNP	0	DNP	0	10	0	0	2 try
Andrew Mailei	5	0.5	0	0	0	0	0	0	0	5	0	DNP	DNP	0	0	1 try
Chris Smylie	5	0.5	0	0	0	0	0	5	0	0	0	DNP	DNP	0	0	1 try
Fili Paulo	5	0.4	0	0	0	5	0	0	0	0	0	0	0	0	0	1 try
Josh York	5	1.7	DNP	DNP	DNP	DNP	DNP	0	5	0	DNP	DNP	DNP	DNP	DNP	1 try
Ken Pisi	5	0.5	0	DNP	0	DNP	0	0	0	0	0	5	0	0	0	1 try
Scott Uren	5	0.7	DNP	DNP	DNP	DNP	DNP	DNP	0	0	5	0	0	0	0	1 try
Tom Chamberlain	5	0.6	DNP	DNP	DNP	DNP	0	0	0	0	5	0	0	DNP	0	1 try
	244	19	22	15	9	23	22	13	17	16	28	22	28	13	16	20 try; 38 pen; 15 con

==== Tries ====
Player	Total	Tries per Round												
Player	Total	1	2	3	4	5	6	7	8	9	10	11	12	13
Rudi Wulf	3	DNP	DNP	0	1	0	0	0	0	1	0	0	0	1
Anthony Tuitavake	2	1	0	0	0	DNP	DNP	1	DNP	0	DNP	DNP	DNP	DNP
George Pisi	2	0	0	0	0	0	0	1	0	0	1	0	DNP	0
Nafi Tuitavake	2	0	0	0	0	0	DNP	DNP	DNP	DNP	1	0	1	0
Nalu Tuigamala	2	DNP	DNP	0	0	DNP	DNP	DNP	0	DNP	0	2	0	0
Andrew Mailei	1	0	0	0	0	0	0	0	1	0	DNP	DNP	0	0
Ben Botica	1	0	DNP	DNP	0	1	0	0	0	0	0	0	0	0
Chris Smylie	1	0	0	0	0	0	1	0	0	0	DNP	DNP	0	0
Fili Paulo	1	0	0	0	1	0	0	0	0	0	0	0	0	0
Josh York	1	DNP	DNP	DNP	DNP	DNP	0	1	0	DNP	DNP	DNP	DNP	DNP
Ken Pisi	1	0	DNP	0	DNP	0	0	0	0	0	1	0	0	0
Luke McAlister	1	DNP	DNP	0	DNP	DNP	DNP	DNP	DNP	DNP	DNP	1	DNP	DNP
Scott Uren	1	DNP	DNP	DNP	DNP	DNP	DNP	0	0	1	0	0	0	0
Tom Chamberlain	1	DNP	DNP	DNP	DNP	0	0	0	0	1	0	0	DNP	0
	20	1	0	0	2	1	1	3	1	3	3	3	1	1

==== Goal Kicking ====
	Conversions		Pen. Kicks		Drop Goals		
Player	Att.	Comp.	Att.	Comp.	Att.	Comp.	Percentage
Michael Harris	15	12	37	28	3	0	72.7%
Ben Botica	5	3	9	7	2	0	62.5%
Luke McAlister	0	0	6	3	0	0	50.0%

==== Disciplinary Cards ====
Player	Total		Cards by Round												
Player	Yellow card	Red card	1	2	3	4	5	6	7	8	9	10	11	12	13
Andrew Mailei	0	1	0	0	0	0	0	0	0	0	1	DNP	DNP	0	0
Filo Paulo	1	0	0	0	0	0	0	0	0	0	0	0	1	0	0
	1	1	0	0	0	0	0	0	0	0	1	0	1	0	0

=== Northland ===
Northland scored 226 points this season with an average of 17.8 points per game, Lachlan Munro led the team with a tally of 146 points throughout his 13 games. They have also scored 20 tries, which captain Jared Payne led with 6, and had one player receive a disciplinary card, which was also the first in the competition.

2009 Northland Provincial Squad
Props: Bronson Murray; Karl Haitana; Ross Wright; Matt Wallis; Hookers: Mikaele Tuu'u; Tim Dow; Locks: Dan Goodwin; Daniel Faleafa; Pat O'Connor; Steve Baker; Cam Jowitt; Michael Farmer	Loose forwards: Eroni Gadolo; Matt Clutterbuck; Cameron Eyre; Matt Harrison; John Cocker; Joel McKenty; Roy Griffin; Halfbacks: Luke Hamilton; Rhyan Caine	Midfielders: Lachie Munro; Derek Carpenter; Nick Collins; Damien Fakafanua; Jon Elrick; David Holwell; Back Three-Quarters: Jared Payne (c); Troy Woodman; Rene Ranger; Simon Munro; Sione Fonua; Brook Gilmore	Coaches: Bryce Woodward (Head); Blair Larsen (Asst.); Most players are capable of playing; multiple positions.: Squad only include players who; have been named in a starting 15 or reserves bench.

==== Points ====
Player	Total	AVG	Points per Round													Details
Player	Total	AVG	1	2	3	4	5	6	7	8	9	10	11	12	13	Details
Lachlan Munro	146	11.2	9	24	8	21	2	5	16	10	11	11	2	14	13	4 try; 32 pen; 15 con
Jared Payne	30	2.3	0	0	5	0	5	10	0	5	0	0	5	0	0	6 try
Joel McKenty	15	1.4	0	0	0	0	0	0	0	5	10	0	0	DNP	DNP	3 try
Brook Gilmore	5	0.8	0	0	0	5	0	0	DNP	DNP	DNP	DNP	DNP	DNP	DNP	1 try
Damien Fakafanua	5	0.5	DNP	0	0	0	0	0	0	0	0	0	DNP	5	0	1 try
Derek Carpenter	5	0.4	0	5	0	0	0	0	0	0	0	0	0	0	0	1 try
Mikaele Tuu'u	5	0.4	0	0	0	0	0	0	5	0	0	0	0	0	0	1 try
Rene Ranger	5	0.5	0	0	0	0	0	0	0	5	0	0	0	DNP	DNP	1 try
Roy Griffin	5	0.6	DNP	DNP	DNP	DNP	DNP	0	0	0	0	5	0	0	0	1 try
Troy Woodman	5	1	5	0	0	DNP	DNP	DNP	DNP	DNP	DNP	DNP	0	0	DNP	1 try
	226	17.4	14	29	13	26	7	15	21	25	21	16	7	19	13	20 try; 32 pen; 15 con

==== Tries ====
Player	Total	Tries per Round												
Player	Total	1	2	3	4	5	6	7	8	9	10	11	12	13
Jared Payne	6	0	0	1	0	1	2	0	1	0	0	1	0	0
Lachlan Munro	4	0	1	0	1	0	0	1	0	0	0	0	0	1
Joel McKenty	3	0	0	0	0	0	0	0	1	2	0	0	DNP	DNP
Brook Gilmore	1	0	0	0	1	0	0	DNP	DNP	DNP	DNP	DNP	DNP	DNP
Damien Fakafanua	1	DNP	0	0	0	0	0	0	0	0	0	DNP	5	0
Derek Carpenter	1	0	1	0	0	0	0	0	0	0	0	0	0	0
Mikaele Tuu'u	1	0	0	0	0	0	0	1	0	0	0	0	0	0
Rene Ranger	1	0	0	0	0	0	0	0	1	0	0	0	DNP	DNP
Roy Griffin	1	DNP	DNP	DNP	DNP	DNP	0	0	0	0	1	0	0	0
Troy Woodman	1	1	0	0	DNP	DNP	DNP	DNP	DNP	DNP	DNP	0	0	DNP
	20	1	2	1	2	1	2	2	3	2	1	1	1	1

==== Goal Kicking ====
	Conversions		Pen. Kicks		Drop Goals		
Player	Att.	Comp.	Att.	Comp.	Att.	Comp.	Percentage
Lachlan Munro	19	15	47	32	3	0	68.1%
David Holwell	0	0	0	0	1	0	0%

==== Disciplinary Cards ====
Player	Total	Cards by Round												
Player	Total	1	2	3	4	5	6	7	8	9	10	11	12	13
Bronson Murray	1	1	0	0	0	0	0	0	0	0	0	0	DNP	DNP
Joel McKenty	1	0	0	0	0	0	1	0	0	0	0	0	DNP	DNP
	2	1	0	0	0	0	1	0	0	0	0	0	0	0

=== Otago ===
Otago scored 260 points this season with Glenn Dickson leading them all with 72 points and an average of 5.5 points a game. Ben Smith led the team with 6 tries from a total of 26 from the team. Peter Mirrielees was the only player to receive a disciplinary card with a yellow in round 12.

2009 Otago Provincial Squad
Props: Ben Nolan; Sam Hibbard; Kees Meeuws; Keith Cameron; Hookers: Jason McDonald; Sam Anderson-Heather; Peter Mirrielees; Locks: Hayden Triggs; Tom Donnelly; Charlie O'Connell; Seko Kalou; Hoani Matenga	Loose forwards: Adam Thomson; Eben Joubert; Alando Soakai (c); Steven Setephano; Paul Grant; Halfbacks: Sean Romans; Johnny Legg; Fraser Lau; James Kenny	Midfielders: Chris Noakes; Andrew Parata; Brett Mather; Charlie Hore; Aaron Bancroft; Glenn Dickson; Michael Witt; Back Three-Quarters: Ryan Shortland; Karne Hesketh; Ben Smith; Luke Herden; Fetu'u Vainikolo	Coaches: Steve Martin (Head); Bruce Carvell (Asst.); Most players are capable of playing; multiple positions.: Squad only include players who; have been named in a starting 15 or reserves bench.

==== Points ====
Player	Total	AVG	Points per Round													Details
Player	Total	AVG	1	2	3	4	5	6	7	8	9	10	11	12	13	Details
Glenn Dickson	72	5.5	0	0	0	0	0	5	9	2	16	5	14	9	12	20 pen; 6 con
Chris Noakes	53	11	14	14	14	2	9	DNP	DNP	DNP	DNP	DNP	DNP	DNP	DNP	2 try; 9 pen; 8 con
Ben Smith	30	2.5	0	0	5	5	5	0	0	0	10	0	5	0	DNP	6 try
Adam Thomson	20	2.2	5	0	0	0	10	0	DNP	DNP	DNP	0	5	0	DNP	4 try
Karne Hesketh	20	1.5	0	0	5	5	0	5	0	0	0	0	5	0	0	4 try
Michael Witt	15	1.9	DNP	DNP	DNP	DNP	0	3	2	3	0	0	DNP	2	5	3 pen; 3 con
Ryan Shortland	15	1.7	DNP	5	0	DNP	5	5	0	0	0	0	0	DNP	0	3 try
Aaron Bancroft	5	0.8	DNP	DNP	DNP	0	0	0	0	DNP	DNP	DNP	DNP	5	0	1 try
Alando Soakai	5	0.4	0	0	0	0	0	0	0	0	0	0	0	0	5	1 try
Ben Nolan	5	0.5	0	0	0	0	0	DNP	DNP	0	0	0	0	5	0	1 try
Keith Cameron	5	1.3	DNP	DNP	DNP	DNP	DNP	0	5	0	0	DNP	DNP	DNP	DNP	1 try
Paul Grant	5	0.4	0	0	0	0	0	0	0	5	0	0	0	0	0	1 try
Sean Romans	5	0.4	0	0	0	0	0	0	0	0	0	5	0	0	0	1 try
Tom Donnelly	5	0.5	0	0	5	0	0	0	DNP	DNP	0	0	0	0	DNP	1 try
	260	20	19	19	29	12	29	18	16	10	26	10	29	21	22	26 try; 30 pen; 17 con

==== Tries ====
Player	Total	Tries per Round												
Player	Total	1	2	3	4	5	6	7	8	9	10	11	12	13
Ben Smith	6	0	0	1	1	1	0	0	0	2	0	1	0	DNP
Adam Thomson	4	1	0	0	0	2	0	DNP	DNP	DNP	0	1	0	DNP
Karne Hesketh	4	0	0	1	1	0	1	0	0	0	0	1	0	0
Ryan Shortland	3	DNP	1	0	DNP	1	1	0	0	0	0	0	DNP	0
Chris Noakes	2	1	0	1	0	0	DNP	DNP	DNP	DNP	DNP	DNP	DNP	DNP
Aaron Bancroft	1	DNP	DNP	DNP	0	0	0	0	DNP	DNP	DNP	DNP	1	0
Alando Soakai	1	0	0	0	0	0	0	0	0	0	0	0	0	1
Ben Nolan	1	0	0	0	0	0	DNP	DNP	0	0	0	0	1	0
Keith Cameron	1	DNP	DNP	DNP	DNP	DNP	0	1	0	0	DNP	DNP	DNP	DNP
Paul Grant	1	0	0	0	0	0	0	0	1	0	0	0	0	0
Sean Romans	1	0	0	0	0	0	0	0	0	0	1	0	0	0
Tom Donnelly	1	0	0	1	0	0	0	DNP	DNP	0	0	0	0	DNP
	26	2	1	4	2	4	3	1	1	2	1	3	2	1

==== Goal Kicking ====
	Conversions		Pen. Kicks		Drop Goals		
Player	Att.	Comp.	Att.	Comp.	Att.	Comp.	Percentage
Michael Witt	3	3	3	3	1	0	85.7%
Glenn Dickson	10	6	23	20	1	0	76.5%
Chris Noakes	13	8	14	9	1	0	60.7%

==== Disciplinary Cards ====
Player	Total	Cards per Round												
Player	Total	1	2	3	4	5	6	7	8	9	10	11	12	13
Peter Mirrielees	1	0	0	0	0	0	0	0	0	0	0	0	1	0
	1	0	0	0	0	0	0	0	0	0	0	0	1	0

=== Southland ===
Southland scored 260 points throughout round-robin with an average of 20 points per game. Robbie Robinson scored the most with a tally of 111 points through his 11 games. They also scored 28 tries with locks Josh Bekhuis and Joe Tuineau leading the team with 4 each. Jamie Mackintosh was the only Southland player to receive a yellow card which came in round 7.

2009 Southland Provincial Squad
Props: Jamie Mackintosh (c); Chris King; Fai Mika; Hookers: David Hall; Jason Rutledge; Brayden Mitchell; Locks: Josh Bekhuis; Joe Tuineau; Dave Gannon	Loose forwards: John Hardie; Tim Boys; Hua Tamariki; Dion Bates; Tom Fleming; Noa Soqeta; Halfbacks: Scott Cowan; Jimmy Cowan; Sonny Rangitoheriri	Midfielders: James Wilson; Jason Kawau; Kendrick Lynn; Seminar Manu; John Dodds; Back Three-Quarters: Tony Koonwaiyou; Matt Saunders; Mark Wells; Glen Horton; Pehi Te Whare; Robbie Robinson	Coaches: Simon Culhane; David Henderson; Most players are capable of playing; multiple positions.: Squad only include players who; have been named in a starting 15 or reserves bench.

==== Points ====
Player	Total	AVG	Points per Round													Details
Player	Total	AVG	1	2	3	4	5	6	7	8	9	10	11	12	13	Details
Robbie Robinson	111	10.1	11	16	8	6	DNP	DNP	14	9	8	8	6	16	9	29 pen; 12 con
Joe Tuineau	20	1.5	0	0	0	0	5	0	5	0	5	0	0	5	0	4 try
Josh Bekhuis	20	1.5	0	5	0	5	5	5	0	0	0	0	0	0	0	4 try
Kendrick Lynn	19	1.5	0	5	5	0	4	0	0	0	0	0	0	5	0	3 try; 2 con
Glen Horton	15	1.9	DNP	DNP	DNP	DNP	DNP	0	0	0	0	0	15	0	0	3 try
Jason Rutledge	15	1.2	0	0	0	0	5	5	0	0	0	0	5	0	0	3 try
John Hardie	15	1.2	0	0	5	0	0	0	0	0	0	5	5	0	0	3 try
Pehi Te Whare	10	0.9	5	0	0	0	0	0	DNP	5	0	0	0	0	DNP	1 try
David Hall	5	0.4	0	0	0	5	DNP	0	0	0	0	0	0	0	0	1 try
Fai Mika	5	0.4	0	0	0	0	0	5	DNP	0	0	0	0	0	0	1 try
Jamie Mackinstosh	5	0.4	0	0	5	0	0	0	0	DNP	0	0	0	0	0	1 try
Jason Kawau	5	0.4	0	0	0	0	0	0	0	0	0	0	5	0	0	1 try
Jimmy Cowan	5	1.3	DNP	DNP	0	DNP	DNP	0	DNP	DNP	DNP	DNP	5	0	DNP	1 try
Matt Saunders	5	0.4	0	0	0	DNP	5	0	0	0	0	0	0	0	0	1 try
John Dodds	3	1.5	DNP	DNP	DNP	DNP	DNP	0	DNP	DNP	DNP	DNP	DNP	3	DNP	3 pen
James Wilson	2	0.2	DNP	DNP	0	2	0	DNP	0	0	0	0	0	0	0	1 con
	260	20	16	26	23	18	24	15	23	14	13	13	41	29	9	28 try; 30 pen; 15 con

==== Tries ====
Player	Total	Tries per Round												
Player	Total	1	2	3	4	5	6	7	8	9	10	11	12	13
Joe Tuineau	4	0	0	0	0	1	0	1	0	1	0	0	1	0
Josh Bekhuis	4	0	1	0	1	1	1	0	0	0	0	0	0	0
Glen Horton	3	DNP	DNP	DNP	DNP	DNP	0	0	0	0	0	3	0	0
Jason Rutledge	3	0	0	0	0	1	1	0	0	0	0	1	0	0
John Hardie	3	0	0	1	0	0	0	0	0	0	1	1	0	0
Kendrick Lynn	3	0	1	1	0	0	0	0	0	0	0	0	1	0
Pehi Te Whare	2	1	0	0	0	0	0	DNP	1	0	0	0	0	DNP
David Hall	1	0	0	0	1	DNP	0	0	0	0	0	0	0	0
Fai Mika	1	0	0	0	0	0	1	DNP	0	0	0	0	0	0
Jamie Mackintosh	1	0	0	1	0	0	0	0	DNP	0	0	0	0	0
Jason Kawau	1	0	0	0	0	0	0	0	0	0	0	1	0	0
Jimmy Cowan	1	DNP	DNP	0	DNP	DNP	0	DNP	DNP	DNP	DNP	1	0	DNP
Matt Saunders	1	0	0	0	DNP	1	0	0	0	0	0	0	0	0
	28	1	2	3	2	4	3	1	1	1	1	7	2	0

==== Goal Kicking ====
	Conversions		Pen. Kicks		Drop Goals		
Player	Att.	Comp.	Att.	Comp.	Att.	Comp.	Percentage
John Dodds	0	0	1	1	0	0	100%
Robbie Robinson	17	12	38	29	5	0	68.3%
Kendrick Lynn	4	2	2	0	0	0	33.3%
James Wilson	4	1	2	0	1	0	14.3%
Seminar Manu	2	0	0	0	1	0	0%

==== Disciplinary Cards ====
Player	Total	Cards per Round												
Player	Total	1	2	3	4	5	6	7	8	9	10	11	12	13
Jamie Mackintosh	1	0	0	0	0	0	0	1	DNP	0	0	0	0	0
	1	0	0	0	0	0	0	1	0	0	0	0	0	0

=== Taranaki ===
Taranaki scored 252 points this season, with Willie Ripia scoring the most with 115 points through his 11 games. They also scored 20 tries with Tony Penn and Shayne Austin leading them with 3 each. Three Taranaki players received disciplinary cards, all yellow; Scott Waldrom in round 2 against Northland, Jarrad Hoeata in there round 3 draw against Hawke's Bay and Craig Clarke in Round 5 against Manawatu.

2009 Taranaki Provincial Squad
Props: Tony Penn (c); Michael Bent; Carl Carmichael; Shane Cleaver; Hookers: Laurence Corlett; James Hinchco; Timothy Tutavaha; Andrew Hore; Locks: Leon Power; Craig Clarke; Samuela Vunisa; Jason Eaton; Nemia Soqeta	Loose forwards: John Willis; Ben Souness; Jarrad Hoeata; Chris Walker; Scott Waldrom; Halfbacks: Brett Goodin; David Ormrod; Kaylem O'Donnell; Bayden Phillips	Midfielders: Jayden Hayward; Willie Rickards; James McSeveny; Willie Ripia; Isaiah Tuifua; Chris Barron; Nathan Hohaia; Back Three-Quarters: Ed Jenkins; Jack Cameron; Asalemo Malo; Esera Lauina; Shayne Austin; Roko Bativagone; Paul Perez	Coaches: Adrian Kennedy (Head); Neil Barnes (Asst.); Ra Mako (Asst.); Most players are capable of playing; multiple positions.: Squad only include players who; have been named in a starting 15 or reserves bench.

==== Points ====
Player	Total	AVG	Points per Round													Details
Player	Total	AVG	1	2	3	4	5	6	7	8	9	10	11	12	13	Details
Willie Ripia	115	10.5	11	DNP	DNP	9	9	5	19	12	9	18	0	8	15	1 try; 29 pen; 1 dg; 10 con
Jack Cameron	49	4.1	0	11	19	2	0	12	5	0	0	0	0	0	DNP	2 try; 11 pen; 3 con
Shayne Austin	15	1.2	5	0	0	0	0	0	0	5	0	0	0	5	0	3 try
Tony Penn	15	1.2	0	0	0	0	0	0	0	0	5	10	0	0	0	3 try
Jayden Hayward	10	0.8	5	5	0	0	0	0	0	0	0	0	0	0	0	2 try
Paul Perez	10	1.3	DNP	DNP	DNP	DNP	DNP	0	0	0	0	5	0	0	5	2 try
Ben Souness	5	0.5	0	DNP	DNP	0	0	0	0	0	0	0	0	0	5	1 try
Jason Eaton	5	0.8	DNP	DNP	5	DNP	0	0	DNP	DNP	DNP	0	0	0	DNP	1 try
John Willis	5	0.4	0	0	0	0	0	DNP	5	0	0	0	0	0	0	1 try
Leon Power	5	0.6	0	0	DNP	DNP	DNP	0	0	0	0	0	DNP	0	5	1 try
Nathan Hohaia	5	0.4	0	0	0	5	0	0	0	0	0	0	0	0	0	1 try
Nemia Soqeta	5	0.6	0	DNP	DNP	0	0	DNP	0	0	DNP	5	0	DNP	0	1 try
Samuela Vinusa	5	0.8	DNP	0	0	5	DNP	DNP	DNP	DNP	0	DNP	DNP	0	0	1 try
Brett Goodin	3	0.2	0	0	0	0	3	0	0	0	0	0	0	0	0	1 dg
	252	19	21	16	24	21	12	17	29	17	14	38	0	13	30	20 try; 40 pen; 2 dg; 13 con

==== Tries ====
Player	Total	Tries per Round												
Player	Total	1	2	3	4	5	6	7	8	9	10	11	12	13
Shayne Austin	3	1	0	0	0	0	0	0	1	0	0	0	1	0
Tony Penn	3	0	0	0	0	0	0	0	0	1	2	0	0	0
Jack Cameron	2	0	0	1	0	0	0	1	0	0	0	0	0	DNP
Jayden Hayward	2	1	1	0	0	0	0	0	0	0	0	0	0	0
Paul Perez	2	DNP	DNP	DNP	DNP	DNP	0	0	0	0	1	0	0	1
Ben Souness	1	0	DNP	DNP	0	0	0	0	0	0	0	0	0	1
Nathan Hohaia	1	0	0	0	1	0	0	0	0	0	0	0	0	0
Jason Eaton	1	DNP	DNP	1	DNP	0	0	DNP	DNP	DNP	0	0	0	DNP
John Willis	1	0	0	0	0	0	DNP	1	0	0	0	0	0	0
Leon Power	1	0	0	DNP	DNP	DNP	0	0	0	0	0	DNP	0	1
Nemia Soqeta	1	0	DNP	DNP	0	0	DNP	0	0	DNP	1	0	DNP	0
Samuela Vinusa	1	DNP	0	0	1	DNP	DNP	DNP	DNP	0	DNP	DNP	0	0
Willie Ripia	1	0	DNP	DNP	0	0	1	0	0	0	0	0	0	0
	20	2	1	2	2	0	1	2	1	1	4	0	1	3

==== Goal Kicking ====
	Conversions		Pen. Kicks		Drop Goals		
Player	Att.	Comp.	Att.	Comp.	Att.	Comp.	Percentage
Brett Goodin	0	0	0	0	1	1	100%
Willie Ripia	15	10	39	29	4	1	69.0%
Jack Cameron	5	3	16	11	1	0	63.6%
Shayne Austin	0	0	0	0	1	0	0%

==== Disciplinary Cards ====
Player	Total	Cards by Round												
Player	Total	1	2	3	4	5	6	7	8	9	10	11	12	13
Craig Clarke	1	0	0	0	0	1	0	0	0	0	0	0	0	0
Jarrad Hoeata	1	0	0	1	0	0	0	0	0	0	0	0	0	0
Scott Waldrom	1	DNP	1	0	DNP	0	0	0	0	DNP	DNP	DNP	DNP	DNP
	3	0	1	1	0	1	0	0	0	0	0	0	0	0

=== Tasman ===
Tasman scored a total of 243 points this season. They have also scored 26 tries. Captain Andrew Goodman scored most points scoring 106 points through 13 games while wingers James Kamana and Blair Cook led the team with 4 tries each. Kahn Fotuali'i and Alex Ainley were the only players from the team have been given yellow cards.

2009 Tasman Provincial Squad
Props: Tristan Moran; Ben Franks; Sakaria Taulafo; Hamish Cochrane; Hookers: Daniel Perrin; Quentin MacDonald; Locks: James Foster; Joseph Wheeler; Alex Ainley; Anthony Elisala	Loose forwards: Daniel Crichton; Jonathan Poff; Mark Bright; Zane Winslade; Glen Gregory; Daniel Hyatt; Halfbacks: Kahn Fotuali'i; Shaun Begg; Ammon Matuauto	Midfielders: Matty James; Andrew Goodman (c); Kade Poki; Sione Halani; Back Three-Quarters: Afeleki Pelenise; James Kamana; Mike Pehi; Robbie Malneek; Blair Cook; Lucky Mulipola (Loan)	Coaches: Kieran Keane; Bevan Cadwallader; Most players are capable of playing; multiple positions.: Squad only include players who; have been named in a starting 15 or reserves bench.

==== Points ====
Player	Total	AVG	Points per Round													Details
Player	Total	AVG	1	2	3	4	5	6	7	8	9	10	11	12	13	Details
Andrew Goodman	106	8.2	3	3	19	11	13	9	15	8	7	11	0	0	4	2 try; 19 pen; 1 dg; 18 con
Blair Cook	20	1.5	0	0	10	0	0	5	0	0	5	0	0	0	0	4 try
James Kamana	20	1.7	0	0	10	5	5	0	0	0	0	0	0	DNP	0	4 try
Afeleke Pelenise	15	1.2	0	0	0	0	0	5	5	0	0	5	0	0	0	3 try
Kahn Fotuali'i	13	1.2	0	0	0	5	0	5	3	0	0	0	DNP	DNP	0	2 try; 1 dg
Alex Ainley	10	0.8	DNP	0	0	0	0	5	0	5	0	0	0	0	0	2 try
Matty James	8	0.9	0	6	2	0	0	0	0	0	DNP	DNP	0	DNP	DNP	2 pen; 1 con
James Marshall	11	3.7	6	DNP	DNP	DNP	DNP	DNP	DNP	DNP	DNP	DNP	DNP	0	5	1 try; 2 pen
Daniel Perrin	5	0.4	0	0	0	0	0	0	0	0	0	0	0	0	5	1 try
Glen Gregory	5	0.6	DNP	DNP	DNP	DNP	0	5	0	0	0	0	0	0	0	1 try
Mark Bright	5	0.4	0	0	0	0	5	0	0	0	0	0	0	0	0	1 try
Robbie Malneek	5	0.4	0	5	0	0	0	0	0	0	0	0	0	0	0	1 try
Tristan Moran	5	0.4	0	5	0	0	0	0	0	0	0	0	0	0	0	1 try
Sione Halani	5	0.7	DNP	DNP	5	0	0	0	DNP	DNP	0	0	DNP	0	DNP	1 try
Kade Poki	5	0.4	0	0	5	0	0	DNP	0	0	0	0	0	0	0	1 try
Quentin MacDonald	5	0.4	0	0	0	0	0	0	0	0	0	5	0	0	0	1 try
	243	18.7	9	19	51	21	26	34	23	13	12	21	0	0	14	26 try; 23 pen; 2 dg; 19 con

==== Tries ====
Player	Total	Tries per Round												
Player	Total	1	2	3	4	5	6	7	8	9	10	11	12	13
Blair Cook	4	0	0	2	0	0	1	0	0	1	0	0	0	0
James Kamana	4	0	0	2	1	1	0	0	0	0	0	0	DNP	0
Afeleke Pelenise	3	0	0	0	0	0	1	1	0	0	1	0	0	0
Alex Ainley	2	DNP	0	0	0	0	1	0	1	0	0	0	0	0
Andrew Goodman	2	0	0	0	0	0	0	1	0	1	0	0	0	0
Kahn Fotuali'i	2	0	0	0	1	0	1	0	0	0	0	DNP	DNP	0
Daniel Perrin	1	0	0	0	0	0	0	0	0	0	0	0	0	1
Glen Gregory	1	DNP	DNP	DNP	DNP	0	1	0	0	0	0	0	0	0
James Marshall	1	0	DNP	DNP	DNP	DNP	DNP	DNP	DNP	DNP	DNP	DNP	0	1
Mark Bright	1	0	0	0	0	1	0	0	0	0	0	0	0	0
Robbie Malneek	1	0	1	0	0	0	0	0	0	0	0	0	0	0
Tristan Moran	1	0	1	0	0	0	0	0	0	0	0	0	0	0
Sione Halani	1	DNP	DNP	1	0	0	0	DNP	DNP	0	0	DNP	0	DNP
Kade Poki	1	0	0	1	0	0	DNP	0	0	0	0	0	0	0
Quentin MacDonald	1	0	0	0	0	0	0	0	0	0	1	0	0	0
	26	0	2	6	2	2	5	2	1	2	2	0	0	2

==== Goal Kicking ====
	Conversions		Pen. Kicks		Drop Goals		
Player	Att.	Comp.	Att.	Comp.	Att.	Comp.	Percentage
Kahn Fotuali'i	0	0	0	0	1	1	100%
Andrew Goodman	23	18	29	19	2	1	70.4%
Matty James	2	1	3	2	1	0	50.0%
James Marshall	0	0	4	2	0	0	50.0%

==== Disciplinary Cards ====
Player	Total	Cards per Round												
Player	Total	1	2	3	4	5	6	7	8	9	10	11	12	13
Kahn Fotuali'i	1	0	0	0	0	0	0	0	1	0	0	DNP	DNP	0
Alex Ainley	1	DNP	0	0	0	0	0	0	0	0	0	0	1	0
	1	0	0	0	0	0	0	0	1	0	0	0	1	0

=== Waikato ===
Waikato scored 285 points this season which Callum Brucescoring the most with 125 points through 13 games with an average of 9.6 points per game. They also scored 28 tries, led by Sosene Anesi with 5. Jordan Smiler, Liam Messam and Save Tokula were the only players to receive a disciplinary card for Waikato; all yellow.

2009 Waikato Provincial Squad
Props: Ben May; Nathan White; Hikairo Forbes; Latu Talakai; Kieran Ramage; Hookers: Ole Avai; Lional Wairau; Vern Kamo; Aled de Malmanche; Locks: Romana Graham; Kevin O'Niell; Kent Fife; Toby Lynn	Loose forwards: Dominiko Waqaniburotu; Jack Lam; Liam Messam (c); Jordan Smiler; Sione Lauaki; Ray Allen; Matt Blain; Alex Bradley; Halfbacks: Brendon Leonard; David Bason; Tawera Kerr-Barlow; Josh Sutherland	Midfielders: Sam Christie; Callum Bruce; Jackson Willison; Roimata Hansell-Pune; Save Tokula; Stephen Donald; Back Three-Quarters: Dwayne Sweeney; Henry Speight; Sosene Anesi; Alesana Muliaina; Tim Mikkelson; Trent Renata	Coaches: Chris Gibbes (Head); Scott McLeod (Asst.); Most players are capable of playing; multiple positions.: Squad only include players who; have been named in a starting 15 or reserves bench.

==== Points ====
Player	Total	AVG	Points per Round													Details
Player	Total	AVG	1	2	3	4	5	6	7	8	9	10	11	12	13	Details
Callum Bruce	125	9.6	6	10	8	11	20	15	9	13	12	13	0	0	8	1 try; 30 pen; 15 con
Stephen Donald	27	6.8	DNP	DNP	DNP	DNP	5	DNP	DNP	DNP	DNP	0	15	7	DNP	1 try; 4 pen; 5 con
Sosene Anesi	25	1.9	0	0	5	0	0	5	0	5	0	0	0	10	0	5 try
Dwayne Sweeney	15	1.2	0	0	0	0	5	0	0	0	0	5	0	5	0	3 try
Henry Speight	10	1.3	DNP	DNP	DNP	0	0	5	0	0	0	5	DNP	DNP	0	2 try
Jackson Willison	10	2	DNP	DNP	DNP	DNP	DNP	DNP	DNP	DNP	0	0	10	0	0	2 try
Liam Messam	10	0.8	0	5	0	0	0	0	0	0	0	5	0	0	DNP	2 try
Save Tokula	10	0.9	0	0	0	5	0	5	0	0	0	DNP	DNP	0	0	2 try
Tim Mikkelson	10	0.8	0	0	0	0	0	0	0	0	0	5	5	0	0	2 try
Trent Renata	8	0.7	0	0	0	0	DNP	0	0	0	3	DNP	0	0	5	1 try; 1 dg
Aled de Malmanche	5	0.6	DNP	0	0	DNP	0	0	DNP	DNP	DNP	0	0	5	0	1 try
Hikairo Forbes	5	0.4	DNP	0	0	0	0	0	0	0	0	0	5	0	0	1 try
Jack Lam	5	0.4	0	0	0	0	DNP	0	0	0	0	0	0	0	5	1 try
Latu Talakai	5	0.6	DNP	DNP	DNP	0	DNP	DNP	0	5	0	0	0	0	0	1 try
Romana Graham	5	0.4	0	0	5	0	0	0	0	0	0	0	0	0	0	1 try
Sam Christie	5	1	0	0	5	0	0	DNP	DNP	DNP	DNP	DNP	DNP	DNP	DNP	1 try
Sione Lauaki	5	5	DNP	DNP	5	DNP	DNP	DNP	DNP	DNP	DNP	DNP	DNP	DNP	DNP	1 try
	285	21.9	6	30	13	16	30	30	9	23	15	33	35	27	18	28 try; 30 pen; 1 dg; 17 con

==== Tries ====
Player	Total	Points per Round												
Player	Total	1	2	3	4	5	6	7	8	9	10	11	12	13
Sosene Anesi	5	0	1	0	0	0	1	0	1	0	0	0	2	0
Dwayne Sweeney	3	0	0	0	0	1	0	0	0	0	1	0	1	0
Henry Speight	2	DNP	DNP	DNP	0	0	1	0	0	0	1	DNP	DNP	0
Jackson Willison	2	DNP	DNP	DNP	DNP	DNP	DNP	DNP	DNP	0	0	2	0	0
Liam Messam	2	0	1	0	0	0	0	0	0	0	1	0	0	DNP
Save Tokula	2	0	0	0	1	0	1	0	0	0	DNP	DNP	0	0
Tim Mikkelson	2	0	0	0	0	0	0	0	0	0	1	1	0	0
Aled de Malmanche	1	DNP	0	0	DNP	0	0	DNP	DNP	DNP	0	0	1	0
Callum Bruce	1	0	0	0	0	1	0	0	0	0	0	0	0	0
Hikairo Forbes	1	DNP	0	0	0	0	0	0	0	0	0	1	0	0
Jack Lam	1	0	0	0	0	DNP	0	0	0	0	0	0	0	1
Latu Talakai	1	DNP	DNP	DNP	0	DNP	DNP	0	1	0	0	0	0	0
Romana Graham	1	0	0	1	0	0	0	0	0	0	0	0	0	0
Sam Christie	1	0	1	0	0	0	DNP	DNP	DNP	DNP	DNP	DNP	DNP	DNP
Sione Lauaki	1	DNP	1	DNP	DNP	DNP	DNP	DNP	DNP	DNP	DNP	DNP	DNP	DNP
Stephen Donald	1	DNP	DNP	DNP	DNP	1	DNP	DNP	DNP	DNP	0	0	0	DNP
Trent Renata	1	0	0	0	0	DNP	0	0	0	0	DNP	0	0	1
	28	0	4	1	1	3	3	0	2	0	4	4	4	2

==== Goal Kicking ====
	Conversions		Pen. Kicks		Drop Goals		
Player	Att.	Comp.	Att.	Comp.	Att.	Comp.	Percentage
Stephen Donald	8	5	5	4	1	0	64.3%
Callum Bruce	20	15	41	30	1	0	72.6%
Trent Renata	0	0	0	0	2	1	50.0%
Dwayne Sweeney	0	0	0	0	1	0	0%
Sam Christie	0	0	0	0	1	0	0%

==== Disciplinary Cards ====
Player	Total	Cards per Round												
Player	Total	1	2	3	4	5	6	7	8	9	10	11	12	13
Jordan Smiler	1	0	0	1	DNP	0	DNP	0	0	0	0	0	0	0
Liam Messam	1	0	0	0	0	0	0	0	0	0	0	1	0	DNP
Save Tokula	1	0	0	0	0	0	0	0	1	0	DNP	DNP	0	0
	3	0	0	1	0	0	0	0	1	0	0	1	0	0

=== Wellington ===
Wellington scored 362 points through the round-robin with an average of 28.3 points per game, and also scored 39 tries. Daniel Kirkpatrick led the team in points with 95 through his 11 games while Hosea Gear led the team in tries with 11. Hosea Gear also, along with Daniel Ramsey and Anthony Perenise, received a disciplinary card, all yellow.

2009 Wellington Provincial Squad
Props: Jacob Ellison (c); John Schwalger; Anthony Perenise; Neemia Tialata; Arden David-Perrot; Hookers: Ged Robinson; Dane Coles; Locks: Api Naikatini; Jeremy Thrush; Polonga Pedro; Nick Paasi; Daniel Ramsey; Mark Reddish	Loose forwards: Faifili Levave; Victor Vito; Scott Fuglistaller; Matthew Luamanu; Rodney So'oialo; Serge Lilo; Masefau Leuliniu; Halfbacks: Alby Mathewson; Ruki Tipuna; Piri Weepu	Midfielders: Daniel Kirkpatrick; Shaun Treeby; Robbie Fruean; Ma'a Nonu; Conrad Smith; Fa'atonu Fili; Charlie Ngatai; Back Three-Quarters: Hosea Gear; David Smith; Tamati Ellison; Buxton Popoali'i; Alipati Leiua; Cory Jane; Apoua Stewart	Coaches: Jamie Joseph (Head); Andre Bell (Asst.); Most players are capable of playing; multiple positions.: Squad only include players who; have been named in a starting 15 or reserves bench.

==== Points ====
Player	Total	AVG	Points per Round													Details
Player	Total	AVG	1	2	3	4	5	6	7	8	9	10	11	12	13	Details
Daniel Kirkpatrick	95	8.6	6	8	6	0	0	18	11	18	12	4	12	DNP	DNP	1 try; 20 pen; 15 con
Fa'atonu Fili	68	5.2	7	3	6	6	4	4	0	0	5	4	4	17	8	1 try; 8 pen; 3 dg; 15 con
Hosea Gear	55	6.1	5	5	0	5	5	20	DNP	DNP	DNP	DNP	10	5	0	11 try
Daniel Ramsey	20	1.5	5	0	0	0	0	0	0	0	5	5	0	0	5	4 try
Alby Mathewson	15	1.2	0	0	0	0	0	0	0	0	0	10	5	0	0	3 try
David Smith	15	1.4	0	5	0	0	0	DNP	0	0	5	5	DNP	0	0	3 try
Robert Fruean	15	1.4	0	0	0	0	0	5	5	0	0	5	0	DNP	DNP	3 try
Alapati Leiua	10	1	0	DNP	DNP	0	DNP	0	0	0	0	5	0	5	0	2 try
Cory Jane	10	1.7	DNP	DNP	DNP	DNP	0	5	DNP	DNP	0	5	0	0	DNP	2 try
Ma'a Nonu	10	5	DNP	DNP	DNP	DNP	5	DNP	DNP	DNP	DNP	DNP	DNP	5	DNP	2 try
Scott Fuglistaller	10	0.9	0	0	5	0	DNP	5	0	0	0	0	0	0	DNP	2 try
Piri Weepu	9	4.5	DNP	DNP	DNP	DNP	DNP	DNP	DNP	DNP	DNP	DNP	DNP	0	9	3 pen
Apoua Stewart	5	1	DNP	DNP	DNP	DNP	DNP	DNP	0	0	5	0	DNP	DNP	0	1 try
Ged Robinson	5	0.4	0	0	0	0	0	0	0	0	0	0	5	0	0	1 try
Jacob Ellison	5	0.4	0	0	0	0	0	0	0	0	0	0	0	5	0	1 try
John Schwalger	5	0.4	0	0	0	5	0	DNP	0	0	0	0	0	0	0	1 try
Mathew Luamanu	5	0.5	0	0	0	0	0	5	0	0	DNP	0	DNP	DNP	0	1 try
Tamati Ellison	5	1.3	DNP	0	0	DNP	DNP	DNP	DNP	DNP	DNP	DNP	5	0	DNP	1 try
	362	27.8	23	21	17	16	14	62	16	18	32	43	41	37	22	40 try; 31 pen; 3 dg; 30 con

==== Tries ====
Player	Total	Tries per Round												
Player	Total	1	2	3	4	5	6	7	8	9	10	11	12	13
Hosea Gear	11	1	1	0	1	1	4	DNP	DNP	DNP	DNP	2	1	0
Daniel Ramsey	4	1	0	0	0	0	0	0	0	1	1	0	0	1
Alby Mathewson	3	0	0	0	0	0	0	0	0	0	2	1	0	0
David Smith	3	0	1	0	0	0	DNP	0	0	1	1	DNP	0	0
Robert Fruean	3	0	0	0	0	0	1	1	0	0	1	0	DNP	DNP
Alapati Leiua	2	0	DNP	DNP	0	DNP	0	0	0	0	1	0	1	0
Cory Jane	2	DNP	DNP	DNP	DNP	0	1	DNP	DNP	0	1	0	0	DNP
Ma'a Nonu	2	DNP	DNP	DNP	DNP	1	DNP	DNP	DNP	DNP	DNP	DNP	1	DNP
Scott Fuglistaller	2	0	0	1	0	DNP	1	0	0	0	0	0	0	DNP
Apoua Stewart	1	DNP	DNP	DNP	DNP	DNP	DNP	0	0	1	0	DNP	DNP	0
Daniel Kirkpatrick	1	0	0	0	0	0	1	0	0	0	0	0	DNP	DNP
Fa'atonu Fili	1	0	0	0	0	0	0	0	0	1	0	0	0	0
Ged Robinson	1	0	0	0	0	0	0	0	0	0	0	1	0	0
Jacob Ellison	1	0	0	0	0	0	0	0	0	0	0	0	1	0
John Schwalger	1	0	0	0	1	0	DNP	0	0	0	0	0	0	DNP
Mathew Luamanu	1	0	0	0	0	0	1	0	0	DNP	0	DNP	DNP	0
Tamati Ellison	1	DNP	0	0	DNP	DNP	DNP	DNP	DNP	DNP	DNP	1	0	DNP
	40	2	2	1	2	2	9	1	0	1	7	5	4	1

==== Goal Kicking ====
	Conversions		Pen. Kicks		Drop Goals		
Player	Att.	Comp.	Att.	Comp.	Att.	Comp.	Percentage
Daniel Kirkpatrick	16	15	29	20	0	0	77.8%
Piri Weepu	0	0	3	3	1	0	75.0%
Fa'atonu Fili	21	15	14	8	10	3	57.8%
Cory Jane	0	0	0	0	1	0	0%

==== Disciplinary Cards ====
Player	Total	Cards per Round												
Player	Total	1	2	3	4	5	6	7	8	9	10	11	12	13
Anthony Perenise	1	0	0	0	DNP	0	0	DNP	0	1	0	0	0	0
Daniel Ramsey	1	0	0	0	0	0	0	1	0	0	0	0	0	0
Hosea Gear	1	0	1	0	0	0	0	DNP	DNP	DNP	DNP	0	0	0
	3	0	1	0	0	0	0	1	0	1	0	0	0	0
