= Dominiko Waqaniburotu =

Fijian rugby union footballer (born 1986)

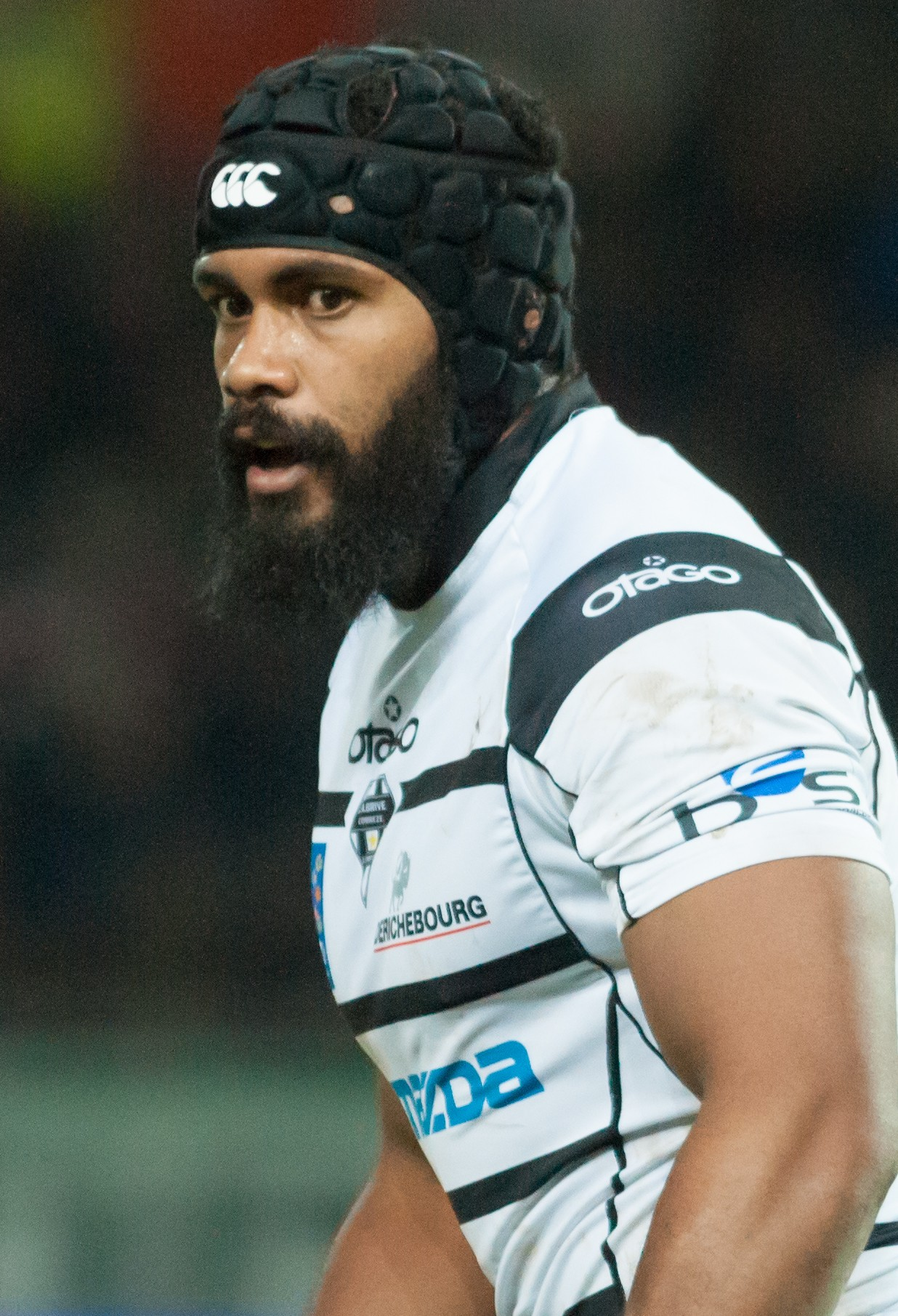
- Full name: Dominiko Maiwiriwiri Waqaniburotu
- Born: 20 April 1986 (age 40) Suva, Fiji
- Height: 1.96 m (6 ft 5 in)
- Weight: 107 kg (16 st 12 lb; 236 lb)
- School: Marist Brothers High School

Rugby union career
- Position: Flanker
- Current team: Brive
Senior career
Years	Team	Apps	(Points)
2009–2010	Waikato	22	(15)
2012–2019	Brive	145	(40)
2019–	Pau	0	(0)
- Correct as of 7 September 2019
International career
Years	Team	Apps	(Points)
2010–	Fiji	46	(25)
- Correct as of 7 September 2019

Dominiko Maiwiriwiri Waqaniburotu (born 20 April 1986 in Fiji) is a Fijian rugby union footballer. He plays as a loose forward and lock for Section Paloise in France's Top 14, the highest division of domestic rugby union. He previously played for CA Brive, also in France in both Top 14 and ProD2, and Waikato in New Zealand's ITM Cup. Waqaniburotu debuted for Waikato in 2009 after representing Waikato at Under 20 and Development level.

Waqaniburotu made his International Debut for Fiji in 2010 against Australia. Waqaniburotu was later made captain of Fiji for the Pacific Nations Cup in 2010 replacing previous captain Deacon Manu who returned to his club side.

Waqaniburotu was a member of the 2011 and 2015 Fijian Rugby world cup team. In 2019 he was the squads captain.

Waqaniburotu played for Top 14 French rugby club Brive CAB from 2012 until 2019. He is currently contracted to Top 14 team Section Paloise (Pau). WAQANIBUROTU captained Fiji to their first ever win over France on 24 November 2018 at Stade de France in Paris. In Fiji's next match following their historic win over France, Waqaniburotu also captained the Flying Fijians to their first win in over 62 years against the Maori Allblacks on 13 July 2019.

== See also ==
- 2009 Air New Zealand Cup statistics
