= Brett Goodin =

- Born: Brett Goodin; 12 May 1985 (age 41)
- Height: 1.75 m (5 ft 9 in)
- Weight: 86 kg (190 lb)
- School: New Plymouth Boys' High School

Rugby union career
- Position: Scrum-half / Wing
Provincial / State sides
Years	Team	Apps	(Points)
2006–2012	Taranaki	75	(18)
- Correct as of 20 October 2012
Super Rugby
Years	Team	Apps	(Points)
2008	Hurricanes	1	(0)
2009	Chiefs	0	(0)
- Correct as of 29 July 2012

Brett Goodin (born 12 May 1985) is a New Zealand rugby union player. He plays Scrum-Half for the ITM Cup franchise, Taranaki. Goodin played 75 games for Taranaki after making his debut in 2006 against Waikato. He made one Super Rugby appearance after being called into the Hurricanes in 2008. He was also called into the Chiefs in 2009 but did not take the field. Goodin has international experience as well with the New Zealand Under 19's.

== Early years ==
Goodin was a member of the New Zealand U19 team which won the 2004 IRB World Championship in Durban, a side coached by Hurricanes Assistant Coach Aussie Mclean and featuring fellow Hurricanes players Hika Elliot, Willie Ripia and Jeremy Thrush.

== Domestic career ==
In 2008 Goodin was called into the Hurricanes midway through the 2008 Super 14 and flew to South Africa as a replacement for Wellington halfback Alby Mathewson.

He was named on the bench for the Hurricanes' third and final match of their South African tour against the Cheetahs in Kimberley and earned his one cap for the side late in that game, as a substitute for Piri Weepu.

Goodin was drafted into the Chiefs squad at the tail-end of the 2009 Super 14 season as injury cover. He was confirmed in the Chiefs 22-man playing squad behind starting halfback Toby Morland.

Goodin returned to Taranaki in the 2011 ITM Cup and was part of the squad that finished third in the ITM Cup Premiership division and that won the Ranfurly Shield off Southland.

He subsequently broke his leg early in 2012 playing club rugby, initially ruling him out of Taranaki's ITM Cup season, before making a fast recovery and featuring in several matches throughout the season.

In 2013 Goodin left Taranaki for Australia after he picked up a club contract in Brisbane.
