= Blair Cook =

New Zealand rugby union player (born 1983)

- Full name: Blair Richard Cook
- Born: 27 April 1983 (age 43)
- Height: 182 cm (6 ft 0 in)
- Weight: 91 kg (201 lb)
- School: Waimea College
- Occupation: Engineer

Rugby union career
- Position: Wing
Provincial / State sides
Years	Team	Apps	(Points)
2005	Nelson Bays	9	(10)
2006–10	Tasman	46	(60)
Super Rugby
Years	Team	Apps	(Points)
2009	Crusaders	2	(0)

Blair Richard Cook (born 27 April 1983) is a New Zealand former professional rugby union player.

Educated at Waimea College, Cook had a delayed start to first-class rugby after a broken leg had him sidelined for most of the 2004 season, before he made his Nelson Bays debut the following year. He joined Tasman for their inaugural season in 2006 and played on the wing for the province, though he was also capable of playing the centre and fullback positions.

Cook, an aeronautical engineer by profession, was called up to the Crusaders wider training group in 2009 as injury cover and took the field in two Super 14 matches, with an eye injury suffered during a game of squash costing him further opportunities. His career included a stint in Spain with Ordizia.
