= Brian McLean (rugby union) =

Brian "Aussie" McLean is a professional rugby union coach, and a former defence coach of the All Blacks.

== Coaching career ==
McLean has had more than 20 years coaching experience from club to international level, most recently as Assistant Coach of Samoa at the 2011 Rugby World Cup. He led the New Zealand Under 19 team to five world championships, including three victories, won titles with Canterbury in 2001 and 2004, provided analysis and coaching for the Crusaders (1999–2000) and was Assistant Coach with the Hurricanes (2006–2008). He was also technical advisor before becoming Assistant Coach of Manu Samoa (2009-2011)

He was appointed as the All Blacks defence coach in 2011, following the appointment of Steve Hansen as head coach. He had worked with Hansen in 2001 winning the NPC title (now ITM Cup) and retaining the Ranfurly Shield.
