= Sam Giddens =

New Zealand rugby union player (born 1984)

- Born: 11 September 1984 (age 42) Napier, New Zealand
- Height: 1.84 m (6 ft 1/2 in)
- Weight: 95 kg (14 st 13 lb)

Rugby union career
- Position: Centre
Senior career
Years	Team	Apps	(Points)
2009–2010	Bristol	14	(23)
2010–2011	Piacenza		
Provincial / State sides
Years	Team	Apps	(Points)
2007–2009	Hawkes Bay	33	(54)
2011	Otago	5	(0)

Sam Giddens (born 11 September 1984, Napier, New Zealand) is a rugby union player who competed professionally in New Zealand and Europe, playing as a centre.

== Playing career ==
Giddens made his debut for Hawkes Bay during the 2007 Air New Zealand Cup, and spent three seasons for the province as a regular starter, also serving occasionally as a goal-kicker for the squad. He helped the Magpies reach the semi-finals of the Air New Zealand Cup in each of his three years for the team.

For the 2009–10 season, Giddens moved to England, signing with Bristol Rugby of the RFU Championship. After a season in Bristol, he moved to Lyons Piacenza in Italy for 2010–11.

Giddens returned to New Zealand for the 2011 ITM Cup, signing with Otago. He started the first four matches of the season before being ruled out through injury.
