= Karl Haitana =

NZ rugby union player

- Born: Karl Haitana; 29 March 1984 (age 42) Marton, New Zealand
- School: Palmerston North Boys' High School

Rugby union career
- Position: Prop
- Current team: Tunbridge Wells
Youth career
- Hurricanes
Senior career
| Years | Team | Apps | (Points) |
| 2005-2008 | North Harbour | | |
| 2008 | Manawatu Turbos | | |
| 2009-2010 | Northland | | |
| 2010 | Manawatu Turbos | | |
| 2013 | Blackrock College | | |
| 2014- | Tunbridge Wells | | |
International career
| Years | Team | Apps | (Points) |
- New Zealand Schools
| – | New Zealand U-19 | | |
| – | New Zealand U-21 | | |

Karl Haitana is a rugby union player born in Marton, New Zealand on 29 March 1984. He has represented New Zealand at international level at a number of age groups and currently plays for English side Tunbridge Wells RFC as a Prop.

== Career ==
Haitana started playing rugby while at Palmerston North Boys' High School, where he was selected to play for the Hurricanes Schools. In 2005, Haitana started to play for North Harbour Rugby Union. In 2008 Haitana started to play for Manawatu Turbos however he was injured while playing for them. During recovery Haitana was approached in 2009 to play for Northland Rugby Union in the Air New Zealand Cup by his former All Black under 21 coach Bryce Woodward. During his time with Northland, he was popular due his facial hair and mullet, which he grew and later had removed for a charity. In 2010, Haitana left Northland to return to Manawatu Turbos however after a second hamstring injury, he was released by Manuwatu. After a few years, Haitana played a few games for Freyberg in Palmerston North before being signed by Irish club Blackrock College RFC in 2013. In 2014, Haitana signed with English team Tunbridge Wells RFC.

=== International career ===
While at school, Haitana was selected to play for the New Zealand national schoolboy rugby union team. He has also been selected to play for the New Zealand national under-19 rugby union team. Haitana was also selected for the New Zealand national under-21 rugby union team in the 2004 Under 21 Rugby World Championship and the 2005 Under 21 Rugby World Championship.
