= Rugby union in Sri Lanka =

- Country: Sri Lanka
- Governing body: Sri Lanka Rugby
- National team: Sri Lanka
- First played: 1879
- Registered players: 161,938 (total)
- Clubs: 105

Club competitions
- Nippon Paint Inter Club Rugby League; Clifford Cup

International competitions
- Asian Rugby Championship; Asian Sevens Series; Asian Games Sevens; Commonwealth Games Sevens; Qualification tournaments: Rugby World Cup qualifiers; Rugby World Cup Sevens qualifiers; Sevens World Series qualifiers

Rugby union in Sri Lanka is mainly played at a semi-professional and recreational level. It is a popular team sport with a history dating back to 1879. In 2012, according to International Rugby Board figures, there were over 160,000 registered rugby union players in Sri Lanka, making it the second largest rugby-playing nation in Asia, behind Japan.

== Governing body ==
The Sri Lankan Rugby Football Union (SLRFU) is the governing body in the country. The Sri Lankan Football Union (as Ceylon Rugby Football Union) was founded in 1908, the first Rugby Union in Asia. The SLRFU joined the IRB in 1988. In March 2011 the IRB stripped the SLRFU of full member status after it failed to conduct board elections in accordance with the By-Laws, the SLRFU's full membership however was subsequently re-instated follows the successful completion of the Union's Annual General Meeting and Board elections.

== History ==
=== Early years: 1879-1945 ===
Sri Lanka discovered the game of rugby at the same time as India, and the first rugby club, the Colombo Football Club, was founded in Sri Lanka in 1879 (in 1896 the Colombo Football Club amalgamated with the Colombo Hockey Club to become the Colombo Hockey and Football Club). The first rugby match played between two selected teams occurred on 30 June that year between Colombo and a 'World' Team.

The first ever club game to be played was on 7 September 1880 between Dickoya MCC and Dimbulla ACC at Darawella, with Dickoya winning the game by 9 points to 3.

In 1885 E. H. Joseph became the first Ceylonese to represent an English School in Cricket and Rugby.

In 1891 rugby was introduced to the country's high schools by L. E. Blaze, the first principal of Kingswood College, Kandy. Kingswood played the first high school rugby match in the country against their hometown rivals Trinity College in 1906. The match resulted in a draw, 6-all.

The nation's first 'national' match involved an All Ceylon team playing against the professional All Blacks (the New Zealand rugby league team) under rugby union rules on their 1907–1908 New Zealand rugby tour of Australia and Great Britain on 12 September 1907. The professional all blacks won the match 33-6. The professional All Blacks only played upon being guaranteed a fee of 50 pounds, this resulted in English Rugby Football Union banning its member countries from playing representative matches in Ceylon.

As a result, in 1908 the Australia national rugby union team passed through the Port of Colombo on their way to England via the Suez Canal, without playing a game in Ceylon. The only solution to ensure matches against foreign teams during their brief stopovers at the Colombo was the formation of a National Rugby Union, affiliated to the English Rugby Football Union. On 10 August 1908 an historic meeting of the Ceylon Rugby Football Union (Ceylon RFU) was held at the Grand Orient Hotel in Colombo, with the representatives from Colombo HC & FC, Uva Gymkhana Club, Kelani Valley Club, Kandy Rovers, Dickoya Maskeliya Cricket Club and Dimbula Athletic & Cricket Club. H. B. T. Bourcher (the representative from Uva) was elected as the first president of the Union with J. G. Cruickshank elected honorary secretary. Boucher held the chairman's position until 1914 but Cruickshank resigned from the post in 1910.

On 20 August 1910, an exhibition rugby match was held between a team from the 2nd Leicestershire Regiment and a combined Ceylon team.

In 1922 the first rugby club to include Ceylonese players, Ceylonese Rugby & Football Club, was formed.

The country's first involvement in a rugby tournament was in 1926 when Ceylon RFU sent an all-Ceylon team (composed entirely of Europeans) to compete in the All India Rugby tournament (originally known as the Madras Presidency Rugby tournament) held in Madras. It was also the maiden overseas tour by a rugby team from Sri Lanka. In 1928 the team tied for the championship and in 1929, under the captaincy of J. D. Farquharson, they won it outright defeating Madras by 11 points to 8. In 1932 they won the cup for the second time defeating Calcutta. At the 1938 tournament the Ceylon RFU fielded two teams one wholly comprising Europeans and the other Ceylonese. The Ceylonese team making history, when in their first match they defeated a combined Planters team by 16 points to nil. The Ceylon RFU ceased participating in the competition in the late 1960s.

During this time the game of rugby flourished in Ceylon mainly due to the plantations companies' enthusiasm and commitment to promote rugby in the country.

The 1930 (which the British Lions won 45–0) and the 1950 British Lions tour to New Zealand and Australia (again a loss 44–6), also played unofficial matches in Ceylon on their way home from tours of New Zealand and Australia.

=== 1945 onwards ===
In the post-WWII period, S. Muthiah campaigned for the sports introduction into the national police service.

In 1938 the Western Australia Rugby Union sent a representative side to tour Ceylon, playing five matches against Up Country, Low Country, All Ceylon, Ceylonese and All Colombo. The side won three out of their four matches (Low-Country 11-9, Up-Country 24-3, Ceylonese 16-6) losing to All Ceylon 12-3.

In 1953 an Australian Colts side toured Ceylon defeating Colombo 35–11, All-Ceylon 39-nil, Up-Country 32-3, the Barbarians 30–3 and All-Ceylon 11-3.

1955 the New Zealand Colts team toured the island winning against a combined Colombo team 35–5, Up Country 24-3, All Ceylon 35–nil and against the Barbarians, 33-nil.

In 1957 the Australian Colts team returned for a second tour beating Low-Country 14-9, Up-Country 43–nil, All-Ceylon 21-nil, the Barbarians 22-nil and All-Ceylon 37–3.

In 1959 a combined Oxford and Cambridge team competed against Colombo 41-nil, All-Ceylon 37-3, Up-Country 52-nil, the Barbarians 55-nil and 45–nil against All-Ceylon.

A British Joint Services (Far East) team in 1964 defeated Ceylon Services 16–5 and against a President's XV 14-6. The British Joint Services returned in 1966 and again defeated Ceylon Services 39-nil and the President's XV 6-3.

The British Joint Services toured for a third time in 1968 beating All-Ceylon 14-12. That year a combined All-India team lost to All-Ceylon 18-19.

In 1968 four clubs sides were invited to participate in the All India Rugby Tournament, Havelock SC, Police SC, CH & FC and CR & FC against four Indian teams, Calcutta, Madras, Armenians and Maharashtra Police. C.R & FC were the eventual winners defeating Havelock SC by 8 points to 6 in the final.

In December 1973 the Ceylon RFU was renamed the Sri Lankan Rugby Football Union (SLRFU). The SLRFU was admitted into the IRB in 1988, as a member of the Asian Rugby Football Union.

=== Recent events ===
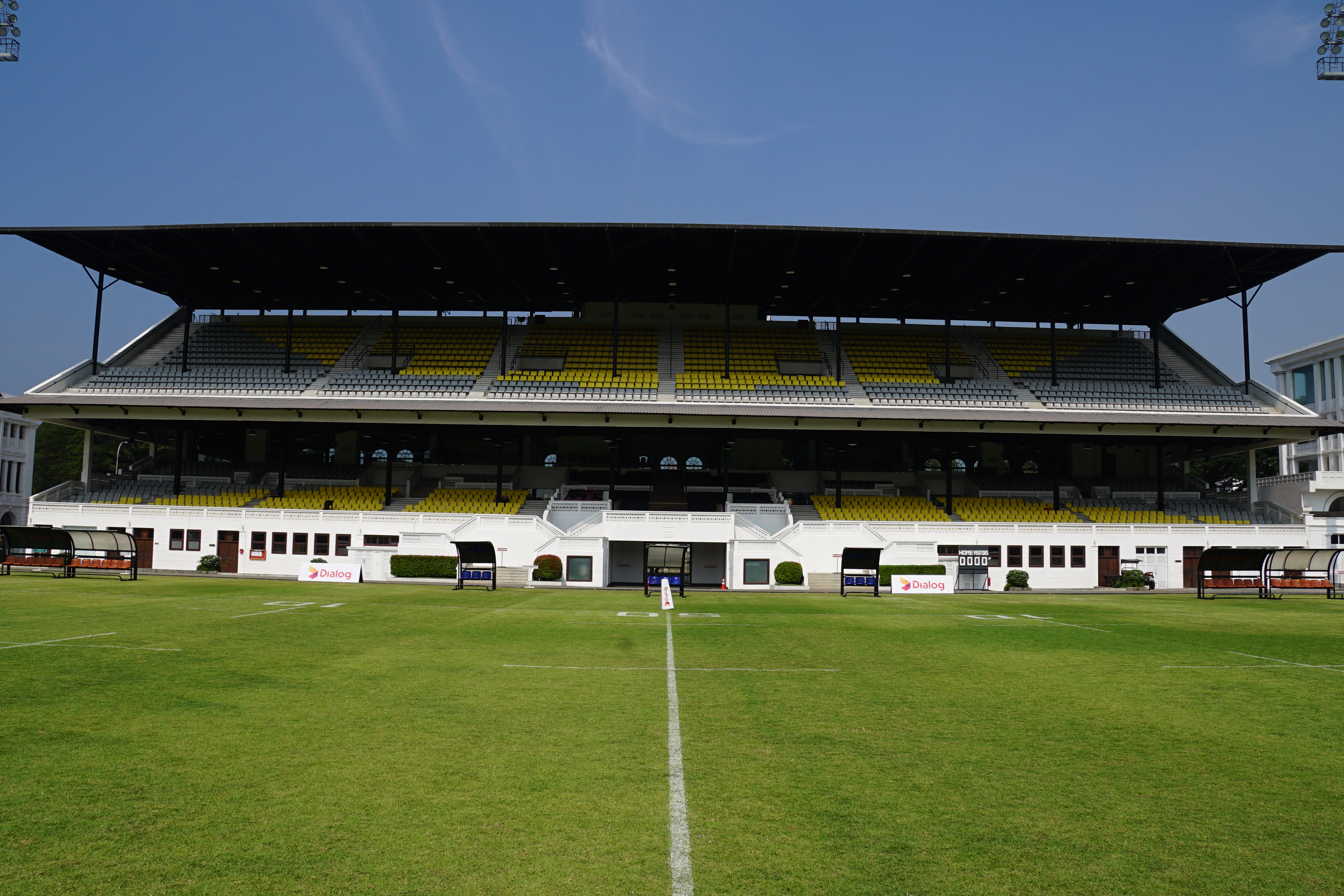
Colombo Racecourse - Sri Lanka's first international grade rugby union ground.

Sri Lanka is considered one of the rugby's success stories, despite a modest win record on the international stage. Crowds of forty or fifty thousand have attended club games. Sri Lanka's problems have been threefold: firstly, a lack of finance, secondly, third world infrastructure, and thirdly, the country has been war-torn for a number of years.

==== Carlton Super Sevens ====
The Carlton Super Sevens series, a domestic club competition comprising two tournaments hosted on consecutive weekends, began in 2011. The series was contested by ten teams, representing the nine provinces of the country and the Jaffna region. Tournament events were hosted at various locations, including Kandy, Galle and Koggola, and the final leg of the series for each season was held in Colombo. Prominent players from around the world were contracted to join each local franchise to raise the standard of competition. With the return of the Sri Lanka Sevens international tournament for 2015, the Carlton Super Sevens series ceased after the 2014 season.

==== Serendib Cup ====
In 2013, Colombo hosted the Serendib International Cup, a tournament for emerging nations which involved Sri Lanka as hosts and the Malagasy and Polish national teams. The competition was backed by the International Rugby Board and played over three match days at Colombo Racecourse between 26 October and 1 November, coinciding with the 2013 end-of-year rugby union tests. There were plans to expand the Serendib International Cup in future years to include 16-24 teams, but the tournament did not survive beyond the inaugural event.

=== Notable players ===
Notable Sri Lankan players include Len Saverimutto, who is the father of scrum half Christian Saverimutto, who was capped three times for Ireland in the 1995–96 season. Mahesh Rodrigo was a dual international and represented Sri Lanka in the national cricket team; he was a scrum half, and captained the Ceylon XV.

== National teams ==
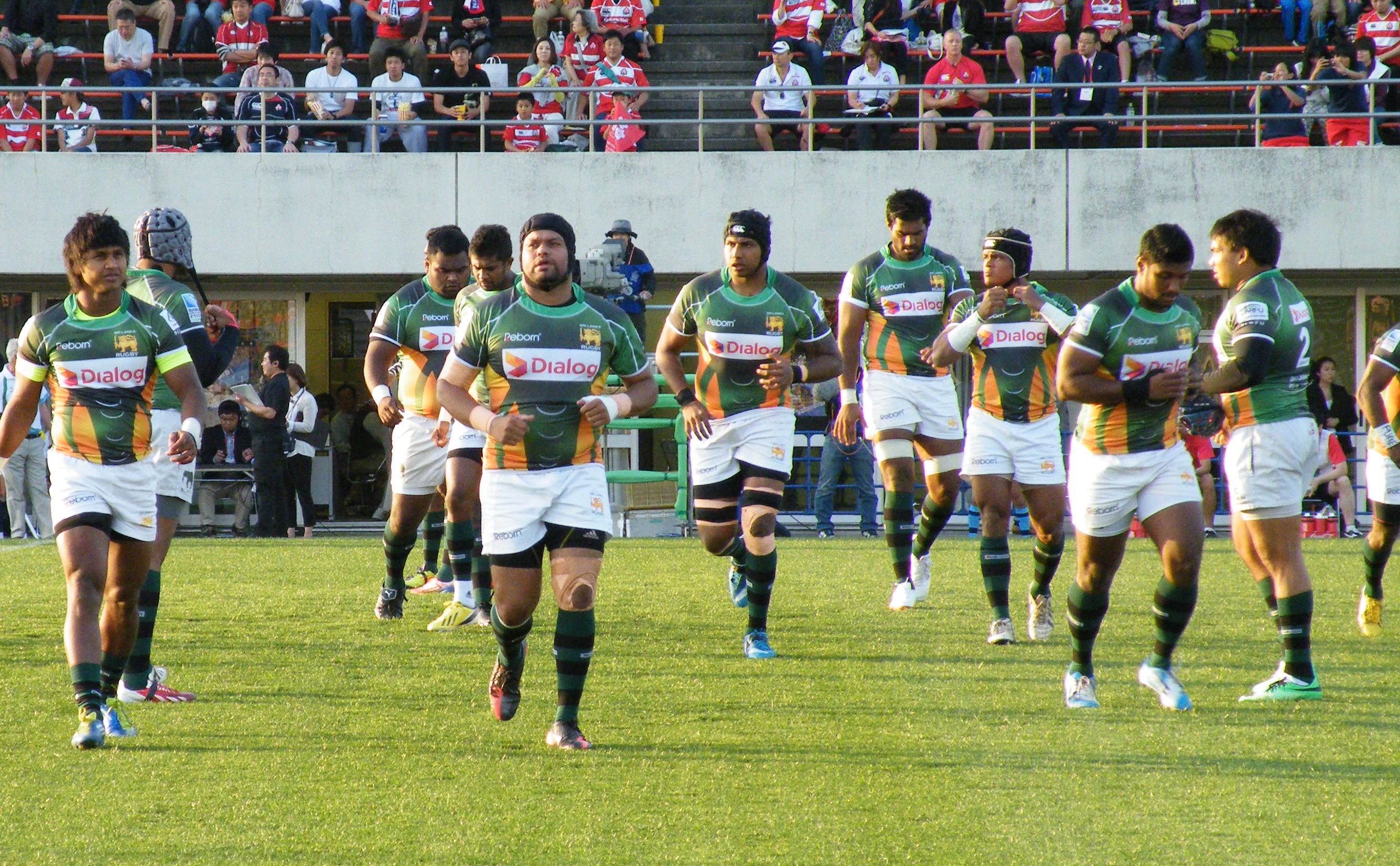
National team in 2014.

=== Men ===
Sri Lanka has yet to qualify for the Rugby World Cup, however the national team has enjoyed success in recent years, rising to 41st on the IRB world rankings table in 2024.

The team is currently ranked fourth in Asia and competes in Division One of the Asian Five Nations.

Sri Lanka also has a national sevens team, which is ranked fourth in Asia.

=== Women ===
Although Sri Lanka's women have not yet played test match rugby, they have been playing international sevens rugby since 2003, with the team debuting at Hong Kong and reaching ninth place in the tournament. In 2005 the Sri Lanka women's team won the Bowl final at the Asian Sevens held in Singapore. In 2013 and again in 2014 the team won the Plate final at the Asian Championships in Thailand (defeating Singapore, 17-5) and in Hong Kong (defeating Thailand, 19-14), the best results the team has achieved to date. – See: Current playing record

== International competitions hosted ==
Sri Lanka currently hosts the Sri Lanka Sevens tournament but has previously held other international events. – See: Serendib International Cup

=== Sri Lanka Sevens ===
The Sri Lanka Sevens is an annual international rugby sevens competition that is currently (since 2015) played in Colombo at the Racecourse Sports Complex. The tournament was originally sponsored as the Singer Sri Lankan Airlines Rugby 7s from 1999 to 2008 and hosted in Kandy. It was rebranded as the Carlton Sri Lanka Sevens and moved to Colombo for 2009 and 2010 when the Carlton Sports Club – Tharunyata Hetak's sports wing – took over the running of the tournament in partnership with the Sri Lanka Rugby Football Union. From 2011 to 2014 it was transformed into a local club competition, the Carlton Super 7s, comprising two tournaments held on consecutive weekends. The international team format was revived for 2015 when the Sri Lanka Sevens tournament, now called the Colombo Sevens, was re-established and included as part of the Asian Sevens Series.

in 2025 from the October 18-19th Sri Lanka Hosted the Emirates Rugby 7s in the Race Course Stadium Colombo. In where Sri Lanka Tuskers finished 3rd following a win against China in the third place match.

== Domestic club competitions ==
The two top-level competitions for rugby union teams in Sri Lanka are the Dialog Rugby League and the Clifford Cup. Previously there was also a series for rugby sevens teams; held from 2011 until 2014. – See: Carlton Super Sevens

=== Nippon Paint Rugby League ===
The major club competition in Sri Lanka is the Nippon Paint Rugby League. It is currently sponsored by Nippon Paints. The 'A' Division features nine teams, which compete on a home and away basis. The League Competition was sponsored by Caltex between 2000 and 2010. In 2006 the Navy SC withdrew from the competition, due to their members military commitments. The club rejoined the competition in 2009 with the Old Zahirians Sporting Club being forced to leave. In 2012 the competition was expanded with the inclusion of a team from Nawalapitiya, the Upcountry Lions, the following year a further team from Hambantota, the Hambantota Sharks was included. Both clubs only played in two seasons of the 'A' Division.

Division 'A' clubs

- CR & FC (established 1922)
- CH & FC (established 1879)
- Havelock SC (established 1915)
- Kandy SC (established 1874)
- Air Force SC
- Army SC
- Navy SC
- Police SC

Former teams

- Combined Universities
- Dimbulla A & CC (established 1856, competed 1908–1975)
- Dickoya Maskeliya CC (established 1868, competed 1908-?)
- Galle RFC (competed 2002 and 2006–07)
- Hambantota Sharks (established 2013, competed 2013–15)
- Jawatte Lions (established 1990, competed 2006–07)
- Kandy Lake Club (established 1962, competed 1967–?)
- Kandy Youth SC (established 1986, competed 2001, 2007)
- Kelani Valley Club (established 1884, competed 1908-?)
- Kurunegala RFC (competed 1996 and 2003)
- Old Zahirians SC (established 1990, competed 2001–09)
- Petersons SC
- University of Peradeniya
- Up Country Lions (established 2012, competed 2012–14)
- Uva RFC (established 1880)

=== Clifford Cup ===
The most prestigious club knockout tournament in Sri Lanka is the Clifford Cup. It commenced in 1911, as a competition between the mercantile executives in Colombo and planters in the hill country. The Clifford Cup was awarded by Lady Elizabeth Clifford, wife of the then Governor Sir Hugh Clifford. The competition has been played amongst eight clubs with 79 seasons played over 100 years.

== Inter-school competitions ==
Inter-school rugby has a rich history in Sri Lanka, with Kingswood College in Kandy standing as the pioneer. In 1891 rugby was introduced to schools in Sri Lanka, then known as Ceylon, and this credit goes to the Sri Lankan educator, Louis Edmund Blaze. Notably, he not only founded the institution but also assumed the role of its inaugural principal.

In 1906, a milestone was achieved as Kingswood College and Trinity College competed in the inaugural inter-school rugby match, resulting in a 6-all draw.

Following these pioneering efforts, rugby's appeal extended to a growing number of educational institutions throughout Sri Lanka, with many schools subsequently embracing the sport as part of their athletic curriculum.

=== Schools Rugby League ===
The focal point of the annual inter-school rugby schedule is the Schools Rugby League, officially designated the Dialog Schools Rugby League due to sponsorship by Dialog Axiata. This event is coordinated by the Sri Lanka Schools Rugby Football Association in partnership with Sri Lanka Rugby.

This event highlights schoolboys in the under-19 age group competing for honours across three divisions: Division 1, 2 and 3. In the 2026 season a total of 80 teams teams competed across these three divisions. 18 teams in the Division 1 – Segment A, 15 teams in the Division 1 – Segment B and 12 teams in Division 1 – Segment C. Division 2 will feature 12 schools, while Division 3 will include 23 schools.

For the 2026 season, Division 1 – Segment A, which is the premier tier, will include the following participating school teams.

Group 1A	Group 2A	Group 3A
Trinity College, Kandy	St. Peter's College, Colombo	Royal College, Colombo
Isipathana College, Colombo	Wesley College, Colombo	S. Thomas' College, Mount Lavinia
D.S. Senanayake College, Colombo	St. Joseph's College, Colombo	Zahira College, Colombo
Sri Sumangala College, Kandy	Ananda College, Colombo	Kingswood College, Kandy
St. Anthony's College, Katugastota	Mahanama College, Colombo	Thurstan College, Colombo
Lumbini College, Colombo	Prince of Wales' College, Moratuwa	Science College, Mount Lavinia

=== Other tournaments ===
The customary opening events of the inter-school rugby season are the seven-a-side rugby tournaments organised by the SLSRFA, namely the All Island Under 18 Rugby Sevens and the Under 19 School's Elite Rugby 7s.

The primary inter-school knockout rugby competition is the Dialog Schools Rugby Knockout Tournament, commonly referred to as the President's Trophy. It features eligible teams from the Division 1 – Segment A league. Teams that qualify from the Division 1 – Segment B and C leagues contend for the Premier Trophy and the Chairman's Trophy respectively.

Apart from the under 19 age group rugby, the SLSRFA also organises tournaments spanning various age levels and involving numerous schools.

=== Traditional inter-school rugby fixtures ===
Alongside the primary tournaments in the inter-school rugby calendar, traditional fixtures between schools also take place. These fixtures are held either as part of the league or as standalone events, generating significant interest among their respective supporters.

Among the array of traditional fixtures, the encounter that holds the most prominent status within the rugby community in Sri Lanka and beyond is the Bradby Shield Encounter. This encounter takes place annually between Royal College and Trinity College since 1945, following a two-legged system. The victor of the competition is determined by the aggregate scores from both matches, which are usually played a few weeks apart.

== Rugby union stadiums in Sri Lanka ==
This is a list with stadiums in Sri Lanka which are used for rugby union. A capacity of 5,000 or higher is required.

#	Stadium	Capacity	City	Tenants	Image
1	Bogambara Stadium	30,000	Kandy		
2	Nittawela Rugby Stadium	25,000	Kandy	Kandy SC	
3	Sugathadasa Stadium	25,000	Colombo	Sri Lanka national football team, Colombo FC, Renown SC	
4	Royal College Sports Complex	15,000	Colombo	Royal College	
5	Colombo Racecourse	10,000	Colombo		
6	Trinity College Rugby Stadium	8,000	Pallekele	Trinity College	

== Sources ==
- Richards, Huw (2006). A Game for Hooligans: The History of Rugby Union. Mainstream. ISBN 978-1-84596-016-2.
- Perera, S. S. (1981). History of a Hundred Years of Rugby Football in Sri Lanka. Sri Lanka Rugby Football Union.
