= 2017 Clifford Cup =

Tournament details
- Tournament format(s): Knockout
- Date: 17 February 2017 – 26 February 2017

Tournament statistics
- Teams: 8
- Matches played: 7
- Tries scored: 73 (10.43 per match)
- Top point scorer(s): Thilina Wijesinghe
- Top try scorer(s): Richard Dharmapala (7)

Final
- Venue: Nittawela Rugby Stadium
- Champions: Kandy SC (20th title)
- Runners-up: Havelock SC

The 82nd Clifford Cup tournament was held between the 17 and 26 February 2017. The 2016 Clifford Cup took place after the conclusion of the regular season, with teams seeded based on their performance in the 2016-17 Dialog Rugby League season.

The top seeded team in the competition, Kandy SC (the previous cup winner and the Dialog league champion) faced the lowly ranked Colombo Hockey and Football Club in the opening quarter-final match. Kandy SC dominated the game, accumulating nineteen tries to nil, with the final score being 121 points to three. Second seeded Havelock SC, were missing a number of the key play makers going into their quarter final match against Police SC however easily accounted for their opponents winning 46 points to 26. In the other quarter final matches Ceylonese Rugby & Football Club (CR & FC) narrowly overcame Air Force SC 36 to 33, with a solitary penalty being the only difference between the two sides, and Navy SC defeated Army SC 35 to 25.

The Sri Lanka Rugby Football Union appointed Julien Castaignede, a French rugby referee, to officiate for the two semi-finals and the final.

In the first semi-final encounter played at the Nittawela Rugby Stadium Kandy SC soundly defeated CR & FC 56 points to 16 points, whilst Havelock SC dominated Navy SC at the Colombo Racecourse winning 39 points to 13.

The final was held at Nittawela Rugby Stadium in wet conditions, following a heavy downpour before the game commenced. Havelock SC dominated the early stages of the match until a crucial injury to key playmaker, Dulaj Perera. Havelock scored first with a penalty in the 8th minute however Kandy equalised five minutes later. A few minutes later Kandy crossed the line with the first try of the day by Gayan Weeraratne, which was converted by Thilina Wijesinghe. Weeraratne followed this up soon after with a second try, also converted by Wijesinghe and minutes before half-time veteran Fazil Marija crossed the line for Kandy SC a third time, which was also converted, resulting in a 24 to 3 score. After the break Havelock SC again dominated the early stages of the second half, with Nishon Perera scoring back to back tries, although Hirantha Perera only converted one. Wijesinghe then managed to score a 30 m (98 ft) drop goal before Havelock's Dushmantha Priyadarshana scored a try bringing them to with seven points. Kandy SC however then put the game out of reach through a try by Richard Dharmapala. The final score line being 30 points to 20, securing Kandy SC's twentieth Clifford Cup.

== Bracket ==
Quarter-finals
17 February 2017 - 16:15; Nittawela Rugby Stadium
Kandy SC	121
CH & FC	3
17 February 2017 - 16:15; Colombo Racecourse
CR & FC	36
Air Force SC	33
18 February 2017 - 16:15; Colombo Racecourse
Havelock SC	46
Police SC	26
19 February 2017 - 16:15; Colombo Racecourse
Navy SC	35
Army SC	25

Semi-finals
22 February 2017 - 16:15; Nittawela Rugby Stadium
Kandy SC	56
CR & FC	16
23 February 2017 - 16:15; Colombo Racecourse
Havelock SC	39
Navy SC	13

Final
26 February 2017 - 16:15; Nittawela Rugby Stadium
Kandy SC	32
Havelock SC	20

== Matches ==
=== Quarter-finals ===
17 February 2017
16:15

Kandy SC	121 - 3	CH & FC
Try: Thilina Wijesinghe (1); Vishva Mithra Jayasinghe (4); Dhanushka Ranjan (2); Richard Dharmapala (4); Yakoob Ali (1); Tharindu Chathuranga (1); Roshan Weerarathne (1); Buwaneka Udangamuwa (1); Lavanga Perera (1); Srinath Sooriyabandaara (2); Arshad Jamaldeen (1); Con: Thilina Wijesinghe (11); Arshad Jamaldeen (1); Yakob Ali (1)	report	Pen: Shamri Burah (1)

Nittawela Rugby Stadium
Referee: Aruna Rankothge

17 February 2017
16:15

CR & FC	36 - 33	Air Force SC
Try: Kavindu Perera (2); Sashan Mohammed (1); Panduka Anganmana (1); Nalin Kumara (1); Con: Nalin Kumara (4); Pen: Nalin Kumara (1)	report	Try: Gayantha Iddamalgoda (3); Anjna Vinod (1); Supun Madhushanka (1); Con: Gayantha Iddamalgoda (4)

Colombo Racecourse
Referee: Priyantha Gunarathne

18 February 2017
16:15

Havelock SC	46 - 26	Police SC
Try: Chamika Samarathunge (2); Sudam Suriarachchi (1); Hirantha Perera (1); Prashanth Madusanka (1); Nishon Perera (2); Sudarshana Muthuthanthri (1); Con: Hirantha Perera (3)	report	Try: Udara Gayan (1); Abzal Mohomad (1); Radeesha Senevirathna (2); Con: Rajitha Sansony (3)

Colombo Racecourse

19 February 2017
16:15

Navy SC	35 - 25	Army SC
Try: Dulanja Wijesinghe (1); Thilina Weerasinghe (2); Richie Dharmapala (1); Supun Dilshan (1); Con: Thilina Weerasinghe (5)	report	Try: Ashan Bandara (1); Gayan Salinda (1); Penalty Try (1); Manoj Bandara (1); Con: Gayan Salinda (1); Pen: Gayan Salinda (1)

Colombo Racecourse
Referee: Dinka Peiris

=== Semi-finals ===
22 February 2017

Kandy SC	56 - 16	CR & FC
Try: Dhanuska Ranjan (3); Visva Mithra Jayasinghe (1); Danush Dayan (1); Buwaneka Udangamuwa (1); Yakoob Ali (1); Richard Dharmapala (1); Suhiru Anthony (1); Con: Thilina Wijesinghe (3); Nigel Rattwatte (1); Pen: Thilina Wijesinghe (1)	report	Try: Omalka Gunaratne (1); Con: Ashan de Costa (1); Pen: Nalin Kumara (3)

Nittawela Rugby Stadium
Referee: Julian Castaignede (France)

23 February 2017

Havelock SC	39 - 13	Navy SC
Try: Sudam Suriyarachi (2); Nishon Perera (2); Vimukthi Rahula (1); Niroshan Fernando (1); Con: Hirantha Perera (3); Pen: Hirantha Perera (1)	report	Try: Roshan Ranasinghe (1); Con: Thilina Weerasinghe (1); Pen: Thilina Weerasinghe (2)

Colombo Racecourse
Referee: Julian Castaignede (France)

=== Final ===
26 February 2017

Kandy SC	32 -20	Havelock SC
Try: Gayan Weeraratne (2); Richard Dharmapala (1); Fazil Marija (1); Con: Thilina Wijesinghe (3); Pen: Thilina Wijesinghe (1); Drop: Thilina Wijesinghe (1)	report	Try: Nishon Perera (2); Dushmantha Priyadarshana (1); Con: Hirantha Perera (1); Pen: Hirantha Perera (1)

Nittawela Rugby Stadium
Referee: Julian Castaignede (France)

FB	15	Thilina Wijesinghe
RW	14	Richard Dharmapala
OC	13	Dhanushka Ranjan
IC	12	Gayan Weerarathna
LW	11	Vishwammithra Jayasinghe
FH	10	Fazil Marijan
SH	9	Roshan Weerarathna
N8	16	Buwaneka Udangamuwa
OF	18	Tharindu Chathuranga
BF	6	Shehan Pathirana
RL	5	Dimitri Wijethunga
LL	7	Sohiru Anthony
TP	19	Ali Mohamed
HK	2	Damith Dissanayake
LP	1	Ganuka Dissanayake
Replacements:
	3	Piyumal Manchanayake
	30	Lasitha Attanagoda
	8	Heshan Silva
	4	Gayan Rathnayaka
	22	Srinath Sooriyabandara
	17	Dashna Dayan
	20	Naijel Rathwatte
	25	Lawanga Perera

FB	15	Kevin Dixon
RW	30	Vimukthi Rahula
OC	13	Nishon Perera
IC	12	Hirantha Perera
LW	11	Chamara Dabare
FH	10	Niroshan Fernando
SH	9	Sudam Sooriyarachchi
N8	7	Sudarshana Muthuthanthri
OF	6	Senal Deelaka
BF	33	Sithum Peiris
RL	22	Umesh Madushan
LL	19	Janik Jayasuriya
TP	3	Dushmantha Priyadarshana
HK	2	Prasath Madhusankha
LP	1	Ashan Darling
Replacements:
	16	Liston Flatney
	28	Udana Anjana
	34	Jason Melder
	17	Sharo Fernando
	20	Shehan Dias
	4	Ganidu Lakshan
	32	Rahul de Silva
	23	Chamika Samarathunga
