= 2018 Clifford Cup =

Tournament details
- Tournament format(s): Knockout
- Date: 16 February 2018 – 25 February 2018

Tournament statistics
- Teams: 8
- Matches played: 7
- Tries scored: 58 (8.29 per match)
- Top try scorer(s): Dhanushka Ranjan (6)

Final
- Venue: Longdon Place
- Champions: Kandy SC (21st title)
- Runners-up: Navy SC

The 83rd Clifford Cup tournament was held between the 16 and 25 February 2018. The 2018 Clifford Cup took place after the conclusion of the regular season, with teams seeded based on their performance in the 2017-18 Dialog Rugby League season.

Navy SC, who finished in second place at the end of the domestic season by a solitary point, competed in the opening quarter-final match at the Colombo Racecourse ground, against the seventh placed Police SC. The lead changed numerous times during the game however Navy SC's captain, Dulanjana Wijesinghe, scored a try in the dying minutes providing Navy SC with a 36-28 victory and a semi-final berth. The top seeded team in the competition, Kandy SC (the previous cup winner and the undefeated Dialog league champion) faced the eighth seeded Air Force SC (who had only managed two wins in the domestic season) in the second quarter-final match held at the Pallekele International Cricket Stadium. Kandy SC dominated the first half of the game, scoring three tries and a penalty to nil, with the final result being 53 points to fourteen. The third seed, Havelock SC, played their quarter final match against Army SC, at Police Park. Whilst Army SC scored the first try of the game, Havelock SC led 19-10 at halftime, going on to win 41 points to 20 and advanced to the semi-finals. In the remaining quarter final match fourth placed Colombo Hockey and Football Club faced Ceylonese Rugby & Football Club at the Colombo Racecourse, in a repeat of the final game of the domestic fixtures. This time however CR & FC made a fast start to the game and were never challenged by Colombo running out eventual winners 46 (seven tries) to 29 (four tries).

The Sri Lanka Rugby Football Union appointed Sam Jones, a Western Australian rugby referee, to officiate in the semi-finals and the final, with Les Cash, an English referee as an assistant official.

In the first semi-final encounter played at the Pallekele International Cricket Stadium Kandy SC defeated a gallant CR & FC 38 points to 26 points, running in five tries to four. The other semi-final match between Navy SC and Havelock SC at the Colombo Racecourse was a closer affair, with the scored tied 12 all at half time (two tries apiece). Navy SC the scored back to back penalties and a try after the half time break before Raveen De Silva was sin binned, this led to a resurgence by Havelock SC scoring successive tries and regaining the lead 26 to 25. Havelock SC however conceded a penalty in the dying minutes of the game, which was converted by Navy SC taking them through to the finals.

The final was held at Longdon Place on Sunday 25 February. Danushka Ranjan opened the scoring for Kandy SC with a try, which Nigel Rattwatte failed to convert. The score line remained at five to nil for most of the first half until Rattwatte put through a penalty right under the posts to extend Kandy SC's lead by another 3 points, with an eight to nil score at half time. After the break Navy SC’s Mohommed Absal capitalised on a mistake by Fazil Marija scoring a try, which was converted by Thilina Weerasinghe. Ranjan then scored his second try with a dive into the corner, with Thilina Wijesinghe failing to convert from a difficult angle. Wijesinghe extended Kandy SC's lead by the putting through a penalty, which was followed by a try from Shehan Pathirana. Navy SC failing to add to their earlier converted try with the final score of 21 to seven. Kandy SC repeating their success in 2017 by winning both the League and Clifford Cups, in an undefeated season, with club stalwart Marija retiring from domestic rugby competition.

== Bracket ==
Quarter-finals

Semi-finals

Final

16 February 2018 - 16:15
Colombo Racecourse

Navy SC
36

22 February 2018 - 16:00
Colombo Racecourse

Police SC
28

Navy SC
28

17 February 2018 - 16:15
Police Park

Havelock SC
26

Havelock SC
41

26 February 2018 - 16:15
Longdon Place

Army SC
20

Kandy SC
21

17 February 2018 - 16:15
Pallekele International Cricket Stadium

Navy SC
7

Kandy SC
53

22 February 2018 - 16:00
Pallekele International Cricket Stadium

Air Force SC
14

Kandy SC
38

17 February 2018 - 16:15
Longdon Place

CR & FC
26

CR & FC
46

Colombo Hockey and Football Club
29

== Matches ==
=== Quarter-finals ===
16 February 2018
16:15

Navy SC	36 - 28	Police SC
Try: Dulanjana Wijesinghe (2); Harsha Maduranga (1); Kasun De Silva (1); Thilina Wijesinghe (1); Con: Thilina Wijesinghe (4); Pen: Thilina Wijesinghe (1)	report	Try: Wajid Fawmy (1); Suranga Kasun (2); Kavinda Jayasundara (1); Con: Sandesh Jayawickrama (4)

Colombo Racecourse

17 February 2018
16:15

Kandy SC	53 - 14	Air Force SC
Try: Shehan Pathirana (2); Richard Dharmapala (2); Yakoob Alin (1); Vishwamithra Jayasinghe (1); Oshan Perera (1); Danushka Ranjan (1); Con: Thilina Wijesinghe (5)	report	Try: Soorya Krishan (1); Jehan Seelagama (1); Con: Charith Senevirathne (2)

Pallekele International Cricket Stadium

17 February 2018
16:15

CR & FC	46 - 29	Colombo Hockey and Football Club
Try: Chanaka Chandimal (2); Joel Perera (2); Gayan Dilshan (1); Kavindu Perera (1); Reeza Raffaideen (1); Con: Tarinda Ratwatte (3); Reeza Raffaideen (1); Pen: Tarinda Ratwatte (1)	report	Try: Sudarshana Muthuthanthri (2); Anuradha Herath (2); Con: Samuel Maduwantha (3); Pen: Samuel Maduwantha (1)

Longdon Place
Referee: Sam Jones (Australia)

17 February 2018
16:15

Havelock SC	41 - 20	Army SC
Try: Prasad Madusanka (1); Randy Silva (1); Sudam Sooriarachhi (1); Dinuk Amarasinghe (1); Dushmantha Priyadarshana (1 Penalty Try); Con: Rizah Mubarak (2); Rajith Sansoni (1); Pen: Rizah Mubarak (1)	report	Try: Janith Lanka (1); Manoj Bandara (1); Samira Bulathsinghala (1); Con: Gayan Salinda (1); Pen: Gayan Salinda (1)

Police Park

=== Semi-finals ===
22 February 2018

Kandy SC	38 - 26	CR & FC
Try: Dhanushka Ranjan (3); Srinath Sooriyabandara (1); Gayan Weerarathna (1); Con: Nigel Ratwatte (1); Pen: Nigel Ratwatte (2); Thilina Wijesinghe (1)	report	Try: Chanaka Chandimal (1); Omalka Gunarathna (1); Shemal Weerasekara (1); Reeza Rafaideen (1); Con: Tarinda Ratwatte (4)

Pallekele International Cricket Stadium
Referee: Sam Jones (Australia)

22 February 2018

Navy SC	28 - 26	Havelock SC
Try: Charith Silva (1); Chathura Gomez (1); Adheesha Weerathunge (1); Con: Thilina Weerasinghe (2); Pen: Thilina Weerasinghe (3)	report	Try: Azmir Fajudeen(2); Lasindu Ishan (1); Gihan Madusanka (1); Con: Riza Mubarak (3)

Colombo Racecourse
Referee: Les Cash (England)

=== Final ===
25 February 2018

Kandy SC	21 - 7	Navy SC
Try: Danushka Ranjan (2); Shehan Pathirana (1); Pen: Nigel Rattwatte (1); Thilina Wijesinghe (1)	report	Try: Mohommed Absal (1); Con: Thilina Weerasinghe (1)

Longdon Place
Referee: Sam Jones (Australia)
