= 2015 Clifford Cup =

Tournament details
- Tournament format(s): Knockout
- Date: 20 March 2015 – 29 March 2015

Tournament statistics
- Teams: 7
- Matches played: 6

Final
- Venue: Nittawela Rugby Stadium
- Champions: Kandy SC (19th title)
- Runners-up: Police SC

The 80th Clifford Cup tournament was held between the 20 and 29 March 2015.

== Seedings ==
The seeding is based upon the teams standings at the end of the 2014-15 Dialog Rugby League season. Last year's cup holder, Navy SC, even though they won twelve matches narrowly lost the league by percentage to Kandy SC, who won eleven games. As Colombo Hockey and Football Club and the Hambantota Sharks both withdrew from the league competition midway through the season the second-round games were played only between seven teams. Kandy SC having the top seeding were awarded a first round bye in the Cup competition.

1. Kandy SC
2. Navy SC
3. Havelock SC
4. Ceylonese R & FC
5. Army SC
6. Police SC
7. Air Force SC

== Quarter finals ==
20 March 2015
16:30

| Ceylonese Rugby & Football Club | 35 - 20 | Army SC |
| | 5T, 2C, 2P - 3T, 1C, 1P |

Colombo Racecourse Sports Complex

21 March 2015
16:30

| Havelock SC | 20 - 34 | Police SC |
| | 2T, 2C, 2P - 5T, 3C, 1P |

Colombo Racecourse Sports Complex

22 March 2015
16:30

| Navy SC | 23 - 37 | Air Force SC |
| | 2T, 2C, 3P - 4T, 4C, 3P |

Colombo Racecourse Sports Complex
Referee: Dinka Peiris

Bye round

| Kandy SC | v | --- |

== Semi finals ==
25 March 2015
16:15

| Kandy SC | 22 - 7 | Ceylonese Rugby & Football Club |
| | 3T, 2C, 1P – 1T, 1C1 |

Nittawela Rugby Stadium
Referee: Pradeep Fernando

26 March 2015
16:15

| Police SC | 27 - 16 | Air Force SC |
| | 4T, 1G - 2T, 2C, 2P |

Colombo Racecourse Sports Complex
Referee: Dinka Peiris

== Final ==
29 March 2015
16:15

| Kandy SC | 77 - 7 | Police SC |
| | 13T, 6C - 1T, 1C |

Nittawela Rugby Stadium
Referee: Anura Rankothge
