= 2016 Clifford Cup =

Tournament details
- Tournament format(s): Knockout
- Date: 11 March 2016 – 27 March 2016

Tournament statistics
- Teams: 8
- Matches played: 6

Final
- Venue: Colombo Racecourse Sports Complex
- Champions: Kandy SC (19th title)
- Runners-up: Ceylonese Rugby & Football Club

The 81st Clifford Cup tournament was held between the 11 and 27 March 2016.

The final was held on Sunday 27 March 2016 between the Kandy SC and the Ceylonese Rugby & Football Club at the Colombo Racecourse Sports Complex. This was the 21st time that these two teams have met in a Clifford Cup decider. Kandy SC, the previous year's cup holders, started the game as firm favourites having beaten Ceylonese R&FC in the first and second round of the league season. Kandy SC were also bolstered by the return of their captain, Fazil Marija, returning from a spinal injury suffered earlier in the season. Ceylonese R&FC having last won the cup ten years ago in 2006.

Ceylonese R&FC scored the first try of the match, with Kandy SC successfully converting two penalties before Ceylonese R&FC scored their second try of the game, which was duly converted. Ceylonese R&FC scored two more penalties with Kandy SC converting a penalty before half time. At the midway break Ceylonese R&FC led 16–13. Kandy SC scored from two consecutive penalties after the break to level the score before Ceylonese ran in another try. Kandy SC then equalised with a try of their own and extended their lead with another try soon afterwards. Ceylonese R&FC then scored another try tying the game at 28 all before Kandy SC converted a penalty in the dying minutes of the match to win the game 31 to 28. The win handed Kandy SC the Clifford Cup for a record 19th time, with the man of the match awarded to Nigel Ratwatte from Kandy SC.

== Seedings ==
The seeding is based upon the teams standings at the end of the 2015/16 Dialog Rugby League season. Last year's cup holder, Kandy SC, were undefeated in the league championship, finishing 13 points clear of second placed Havelock SC. Kandy SC seeded No. 1 were drawn to play 8th seeded Colombo Hockey and Football Club, the SLRFU normally allocates the games on neutral grounds but the CH&FC agreed to play their match at Nittawela Rugby Stadium, subject to their travel expenses being borne by the Kandy Sports Club. The opening game on 11 March was held between No. 3 seed Ceylonese Rugby & Football Club and No. 6 seed Army SC at the Colombo Racecourse Sports Complex.

1. Kandy SC
2. Havelock SC
3. Ceylonese R&FC
4. Navy SC
5. Police SC
6. Army SC
7. Air Force SC
8. Colombo H&FC

== Quarter-finals ==
11 March 2016
16:15

Ceylonese Rugby & Football Club	35 - 26	Army SC
	4T, 3C, 3P - 4T, 3C

Colombo Racecourse Sports Complex

12 March 2016
16:15

Kandy SC	89 - 7	Colombo H&FC
	13T, 12C - 1T, 1C

Nittawela Rugby Stadium

12 March 2016
16:15

Havelock SC	20 - 11	Air Force SC
	2T, 2C, 2P - 1T, 1C, 1P

Colombo Racecourse Sports Complex

14 March 2016
16:15

Navy SC	19 - 10	Police SC
	2T, 3P - 1T, 1C, 1P

Colombo Racecourse Sports Complex

== Semi-finals ==
19 March 2016
16:15

Havelock Sports Club	27 - 34	Ceylonese Rugby & Football Club
	5T, 3P - 2G, 2T, 1P

Colombo Racecourse Sports Complex
Referee: Tim Baker

20 March 2016
16:15

Kandy SC	37 - 27	Navy SC
	6T, 2C, 1P - 4T, 2C, 1P

Pallekele Stadium
Referee: Tim Baker

== Final ==
26 March 2016
16:30

Kandy SC	31 - 28	Ceylonese Rugby & Football Club
	2T, 1PT, 2C, 4P - 4T, 1C, 3P

Colombo Racecourse Sports Complex
Referee: Tim Baker
