= 2016–17 Dialog Rugby League season =

2016–17 Dialog Rugby League
- Countries: Sri Lanka
- Date: 4 November 2016 – 11 March 2017
- Champions: Kandy SC
- Runners-up: Havelock SC
- Matches played: 56

The 2016–17 Dialog Rugby League was the 66th season of the top flight of Sri Lankan domestic rugby union competition. The competition is sponsored and broadcast by Dialog TV.

The league consists of 8 clubs playing in a home-and-away double round robin. The standings at the end of the season determine the seedings for the 2017 edition of the Clifford Cup playoffs held in the spring.

The reigning champions of both last year's regular season and the 2016 Clifford Cup is Kandy SC, who claimed their 17th league title after finishing the 2015–2016 season undefeated, two games clear of runners up Havelock SC.

The 2016–17 season was the first season that the SLRFU introduced a Television Match Official (TMO) for selected domestic games.

Kandy SC began the season in dominant form defeating CH&FC 96 to nil in their opening game before losing to Air Force SC the following week in a close game 24 to 21. Before the mid season break at the end of the year Kandy SC lost a second game, this time to Navy SC 32–37. Havelock SC commenced the year with a six-game winning streak, which ended with a 30–39 loss to Kandy SC on 18 December 2016.

In the second half of the season both Kandy SC and Havelock SC continued their respective unbeaten runs, with the title race coming down to the second last game of the season. The resultant win by Kandy SC 26-11 virtually secured the club the title, as whilst both clubs have the same number of wins for the season Kandy SC have more bonus points due to the size of their winning margins over the season. In the final round of the season Kandy SC finished in the same manner as they started by comprehensively defeating CH&FC 59–3, thereby retaining their League title for the 3rd year in a row.

== Teams ==
Locations of Division 'A' teams

Division 'A' clubs
Colours	Club	Established	City	Stadium	Capacity*	Titles (Last)**
	Air Force Sports Club	-	Ratmalana	Air Force Ground Ratmalana	-	-
	Army Sports Club	1962	Panagoda	Sri Lanka Army Rugby Ground Panagoda	-	2 (1975)
	Ceylonese Rugby & Football Club	1922	Colombo	Longdon Place	5,550	13 (2002)
	Colombo Hockey and Football Club	1892	Colombo	Colombo Racecourse	40,000	10 (2000)
	Havelock Sports Club	1915	Havelock Town	Havelock Park	-	14 (2012)
	Kandy Sports Club	1888	Kandy	Nittawela Rugby Stadium	25,000	17 (2016)
	Navy Sports Club	-	Welisara	Welisara Navy ground	-	1 (2014)
	Police Sports Club	1926	Bambalapitiya	Police Park	-	9 (1991)

== League table ==
Table standings updated through 12 February 2017

Season champions

Place	Club	Games				Points			Bonus points	Table points
Place	Club	played	won	drawn	lost	for	against	diff	Bonus points	Table points
1	Kandy SC	14	12	0	2	633	257	+376	15	75
2	Havelock SC	14	12	0	2	470	210	+260	9	69
3	Navy SC	14	10	0	3	463	336	+127	7	57
4	CR & FC	14	6	0	7	454	338	+116	12	47
5	Air Force SC	14	6	0	7	333	411	−78	5	40
6	Army SC	14	5	0	8	359	383	−24	9	34
7	Police SC	14	3	0	10	289	389	-100	7	22
8	CH & FC	14	0	0	13	149	796	-647	2	2
Points are awarded to the teams as follows: Win - 5 points Draw - 2 points 4 or more tries - 1 point Loss within 7 points - 1 point Loss greater than 7 points - 0 points

== Try and Points scorers ==
Leading Try Scorer
Player	Club	Tries
Danushka Ranjun	Kandy SC	16
Richard Dharmapala	Kandy SC	12
Dulanjan Wijesinghe	Navy SC	11

Leading Points Scorer
Player	Club	Points
Dulaj Perera	Havelock SC	171
Thilina Weerasinghe	Navy SC	154
Thilina Wijesinghe	Kandy SC	118

== League Season ==
=== Week 1 ===
4 November 2016	Police	8-29	Navy	Police Park
		report

5 November 2016	Air Force	5-29	Havelock	Ratmalana Ground
		report

5 November 2016	CH & FC	0-96	Kandy	Nittawela Ground
		report

6 November 2016	Army	24-25	CR & FC	Colombo Racecourse
		report

=== Week 2 ===
12 November 2016	Police	12-37	Havelock	Police Park
		report

12 November 2016	Air Force	24-21	Kandy	Ratmalana Ground
		report

12 November 2016	CH & FC	12-39	Army	Colombo Racecourse
		report

13 November 2016	Navy	21-13	CR & FC	Welisara
		report

=== Week 3 ===
18 November 2016	Police	12-22	Air Force	Police Park
		report

18 November 2016	Army	10-34	Kandy	Colombo Racecourse
		report

19 November 2016	Havelock	10-6	CR & FC	Havelock Park
		report

20 November 2016	Navy	55-3	CH & FC	Welisara
		report

=== Week 4 ===
25 November 2016	Havelock	48-5	CH & FC	Havelock Park
		report

26 November 2016	Army	24-25	Navy	Army Ground
		report

26 November 2016	Kandy	34-9	Police	Nittawela
		report

27 November 2016	CR & FC	57-20	Air Force	Longdon Place
		report

=== Week 5 ===
2 December 2016	CH & FC	12-26	Air Force	CH & FC Ground
		report

3 December 2016	CR & FC	31-26	Police	Langdon Place
		report

4 December 2016	Havelock	37-26	Army	Havelock Park
		report

4 December 2016	Navy	37-32	Kandy	Welisara
		report

=== Week 6 ===
10 December 2016	CH & FC	26-45	Police	Colombo Racecourse
		report

10 December 2016	Air Force	32-29	Army	Ratmalana
		report

11 December 2016	Kandy	53-29	CR & FC	Nittawala
		report

11 December 2016	Havelock	26-19	Navy	Havelock Park
		report

=== Week 7 ===
16 December 2016	Air Force	8-22	Navy	Ratamalana
		report

17 December 2016	CR & FC	83-13	CH & FC	Colombo Racecourse
		report

17 December 2016	Police	24-27	Army	Police Park
		report

18 December 2016	Kandy	39-30	Havelock	Nittawala
		report

=== Week 8 ===
29 December 2016	CH & FC	3-80	Havelock	CH & FC Ground
		report

30 December 2016	Navy	41-28	Police	Welisara
		report

30 December 2016	Air Force	22-34	CR & FC	Ratmalana
		report

31 December 2016	Kandy	50-19	Army	Nittawala
		report

=== Week 9 ===
6 January 2017	Havelock	29-13	Police	Havelock Park
		report

7 January 2017	Navy	29-21	Air Force	Welisara
		report

7 January 2017	CR & FC	27-32	Kandy	Longdon Place
		report

8 January 2017	Army	43-3	CH & FC	Army Ground
		report

=== Week 10 ===
13 January 2017	Air Force	15-13	Police	Ratmalana
		report

14 January 2017	CH & FC	3-62	CR & FC	Longdon Place
		report

15 January 2017	Army	17-29	Havelock	Ratmalana
		report

15 January 2017	Kandy	50-22	Navy	Nittawala
		report

=== Week 11 ===
21 January 2017	Havelock	37-29	Air Force	Havelock Park
		report

21 January 2017	Police	23-34	Kandy	Police Park
		report

21 January 2017	CH & FC	23-81	Navy	Longdon Place
		report

22 January 2017	CR & FC	20-24	Army	Longdon Place
		report

=== Week 12 ===
28 January 2017	CR & FC	10-31	Havelock	Longdon Place
16:00		report

28 January 2017	Navy	17-30	Army	Welisara
16:00		report

29 January 2017	Kandy	73-13	Air Force	Nittawela
16:00		report

29 January 2017	Police	26-21	CH & FC	Police Park
16:00		report

=== Week 13 ===
3 February 2017	Air Force	53-17	CH & FC	Ratmalana
16:00		scorecard

3 February 2017	CR & FC	34-37	Navy	Longdon
16:00		scorecard

5 February 2017	Army	21-27	Police	Army Ground
16:00		scorecard

5 February 2017	Havelock	11-26	Kandy	Havelock Park
18:30		scorecard

=== Week 14 ===
11 February 2017	CH & FC	3-59	Kandy	CH & FC Ground
16:00		report

11 February 2017	Police	22-23	CR & FC	Police Park
16:00		report

11 February 2017	Army	26-43	Air Force	Army Ground
16:00

12 February 2017	Navy	28-36	Havelock	Welisara
16:00
