= Chris Cloete =

South African rugby union player (born 1991)

- Full name: Christopher Anthony Cloete
- Born: 15 February 1991 (age 35) East London, South Africa
- Height: 1.75 m (5 ft 9 in)
- Weight: 106 kg (16.7 st; 234 lb)
- School: Selborne College
- Notable relative: Wesley Cloete (brother)

Rugby union career
- Position: Flanker
Youth career
- 2004–2009: Border Bulldogs
- 2009–2012: Sharks
Amateur team(s)
Years	Team	Apps	(Points)
2013	Old Selbornians		
2014	NMMU Madibaz	8	(40)
Senior career
Years	Team	Apps	(Points)
2012	Sharks XV	7	(5)
2013	Western Province	4	(25)
2014–2015	Kandy		
2015	Western Province	8	(0)
2016–2017	Southern Kings	23	(30)
2016–2017	Pumas	6	(5)
2017–2022	Munster	65	(55)
2022–2024	Bath	23	(10)
- Correct as of 20 January 2024
International career
Years	Team	Apps	(Points)
2009	South Africa Schools	2	(0)
2017	South Africa A	1	(10)
- Correct as of 10 July 2017

Christopher Anthony Cloete (born 15 February 1991) was a South African rugby union player who last played for Bath in the Gallagher Premiership. His regular position was flanker.

== Early life ==
Cloete grew up in East London and was included in a number of youth provincial sides; he represented them at the 2004 Under-13 Craven Week, the 2006 Under-16 Grant Khomo Week and at the Under-18 Craven Week competitions in both 2008 and 2009.

He was also included in the 2009 South African Schools side. He came on as a replacement in their 86–3 victory against Italy and started their 13–45 defeat to England in two matches played in August 2009.

== Career ==
=== Sharks ===
After high school, Cloete moved to Durban to join the Sharks Academy. He made appearances for the Sharks U19 side in the 2009 and 2010 Under-19 Provincial Championships, before suffering a broken leg in their 2010 match against the Griffons which ruled him out of action for a year.

He returned to action for the Sharks U21s in 2011, scoring three tries in fourteen appearances in the 2011 Under-21 Provincial Championship.

In 2012, he was included in the Sharks XV Vodacom Cup squad for the first time and he made his first class debut in his hometown of East London, coming on as a replacement in a 42–0 victory against former side Border Bulldogs. He played off the bench in a 15–17 defeat to Western Province a week later to make his home debut and then made his first start in his next match, also marking the occasion by scoring his first try in a 51–38 victory over the Free State XV. He made one more start and three appearances off the bench in the remainder of the competition and started a six matches for the Sharks U21s in the 2012 Under-21 Provincial Championship in the second half of 2012.

=== Western Province ===
In 2013, Cloete moved to Cape Town to join Western Province. He made his debut for Western Province in the 2013 Vodacom Cup competition, starting their match against Western Cape rivals Boland Cavaliers and scoring a try in a 17–17 draw between the sides in Ceres. He started their next match against the Sharks, as well as their match after that, a 43–18 win against the Eastern Province Kings, with Cloete getting a first-half hat-trick in the match. He also started their 22–13 victory over the Border Bulldogs, scoring his fifth try of the competition to finish as Western Province's top try scorer in the competition.

=== Varsity Cup ===
In 2014, Cloete joined Port Elizabeth-based university side NMMU Madibaz. He played in all eight of their matches during the 2014 Varsity Cup, which saw the Madibaz reach their second consecutive semi-final in the competition. Cloete was the top try scorer in the competition, scoring eight tries in his eight appearances. This included five tries in their opening match of the campaign, a 45–29 victory over three-times champions, Maties.

=== Kandy ===
After the 2014 Varsity Cup competition, Cloete moved to Sri Lanka to join Dialog Rugby League and Clifford Cup side Kandy. He helped the side win the competition, beating Navy in a two-legged final. Cloete was the top try scorer in the league (and also scored a try in the final), but sustained an injury prior to their 2015 Clifford Cup and returned to South Africa to have an operation.

=== Return to Western Province ===
Upon his return to South Africa, Cloete joined Hamilton rugby club. He was included in Western Province squad for the 2015 Currie Cup Premier Division and named on the bench for their opening match of the season against Griquas.

=== Pumas, Southern Kings & South Africa A ===
He joined Nelspruit-based side the Pumas for the 2016 season. On 23 June 2017, Cloete started for South Africa 'A' in their second test against the French Barbarians, scoring two tries in his sides 48–28 win in Orlando Stadium, Soweto.

=== Munster ===
In July 2017, it was announced that Cloete had joined Irish United Rugby Championship side Munster on a three-year contract. He made his debut for the province on 3 November 2017, starting against Welsh side Dragons in a 2017–18 Pro14 fixture and helping Munster to a 49–6 win. Cloete earned the Man-of-the-Match award in Munster's 36–19 away win against Zebre on 26 November 2017. He scored his first try for Munster in their 36–10 win against Ospreys on 2 December 2017. Cloete made his European Rugby Champions Cup debut on 9 December 2017, starting in the Pool 4 fixture against Leicester Tigers in Thomond Park and scoring a try in the provinces' 33–10 win.

He suffered a fractured forearm during Munster's 21–10 win against Glasgow Warriors on 23 February 2018. Having returned to training after rehabilitating the forearm injury, Cloete then suffered a groin injury which caused him to miss Munster's 2018–19 pre-season fixtures and the opening two rounds of the 2018–19 Pro14. Cloete made his return from injury on 14 September 2018, starting in Munster's Pro14 round 3 fixture against Ospreys and earning the Man-of-the-Match award in Munster's 49–13 win. He extended his contract with Munster by an additional two years in October 2018. After five seasons with province, Cloete left Munster at the end of the 2021–22 season.

=== Bath ===
Cloete joined English Premiership Rugby club Bath ahead of the 2022–23 season, where former Munster head coach Johann van Graan also moved as the clubs new head coach.

He subsequently retired from rugby at the end of the 2023-2024 English Premiership season.

== Personal ==
He is the younger brother of prop Wesley Cloete.
