= Sri Lanka Rugby Championship =

National rugby union club competition

- Current season or competition: Maliban Inter-Club Rugby League 2025/26
- Sport: Rugby union
- Formerly known as: John Player 'Gold Leaf' Rugby Championship; Carlsberg Rugby League; Caltex League; Dialog Rugby League; Nippon Paint League
- Inaugural season: 1950
- Number of teams: 9
- Country: Sri Lanka (SLRFU)
- Holders: Kandy SC (2024/25)
- Most titles: Kandy Sports Club (23 titles)
- Related competition: Clifford Cup; Presidents Trophy

The Sri Lanka Rugby Championship, known as the Maliban Inter-Club Rugby League for sponsorship reasons, is the major national rugby union club competition, held between the top Division 'A' rugby sides, in Sri Lanka. The annual home and away competition, featuring eight Division 'A' teams, has been held since 1950. The competition has been held between November and February for the last three seasons. The first round of the tournament runs for seven weekends with the final match of the first round in early January, no games are played over the Christmas holiday period. The second round also runs for seven weekends, with the final match in the beginning of March.

== History ==
=== Early years of the league (1950-60) ===
The first league competition commenced in 1950. when the Clifford Cup was converted to an inter-club competition played amongst eight clubs, Kandy Sports Club, Dimbula Athletic & Cricket Club, Dickoya Maskeliya Cricket Club, Uva Gymkhana Club, Kelani Valley Club, Havelock Sports Club, Ceylonese Rugby & Football Club and Colombo Hockey and Football Club. The inaugural winner of the competition was the Havelock Sports Club, led by Ian Labrooy, completing an undefeated season by defeating Dimbula A & CC, 13-0. Havelock SC retained the league title the following year again maintaining an unbeaten record during the season. In 1952 Ceylonese R&FC, captained by Mahes Rodrigo (who went on to become a dual international in rugby and cricket) won the league title. The following year Dimbula A&CC, captained by Lyn Simpson, became the first club from Up-Country to win the league by defeating the previous years title holders, Ceylonese R&FC, 6-0.

The Kandy Sporting Club made their first appearance in a Clifford Cup final in 1954, where they lost 21-5 against Ceylonese R&FC. Ceylonese R&FC went on to win the title in the next two successive years (1955–56) The title was shared for the first time in 1959 when Dimbula and Ceylonese R & FC competed in an 11-all draw. In 1957 the Colombo H&FC, led by St. John Davies, won the league for the first time against a combined Dimbula/Dickoya team, skippered by Malcolm Wright. In 1958 Ceylonese R&FC, captained by Ashy Cader, won the title, beating Dickoya MCC.

In 1959 Ceylonese R&FC, captained by Ago Paiva, shared the league title with Dimbula A&CC, led by Ken McPherson. The following year Colombo H&FC, skippered by Jeremy Lloyd, were triumphant defeating Dimbulla A&CC.

=== League and knockout (1961-84) ===
In 1961 five 'affiliated' rugby clubs, Police SC, Army, University, Air Force and Navy from Division 'B' were invited to join the tournament and play against the 'constituent clubs', forming a thirteen team competition. The format of the competition was also changed, whereby all 13 clubs had to play each other once on a home and away basis in alternate years and at the end of the league season the best eight teams competed in a knock-out tournament for the Clifford Cup.

In 1971, led by captain and coach Y. C. Chang, Colombo H&FC secured the league title. The 1972 final was played between Police SC, captained by Anton Benedict, and Colombo H&FC, led by Y. C. Chang, with the eventual league title holders Police SC winning 9–6.

In 1973 Army SC, captained by S. P. de Silva, for the first time since they entered the competition eleven years earlier reached the final and their opponents were Police SC, skippered by Nizam Hajireen. It was a close match in the final and ended in a 19-all draw with both teams declared as joint champions.

In 1974, the Havelock SC, under Desmond Harridge, secured the title defeating Ceylonese R&FC 16–4. The following year Army SC and Air Force SC justified their being elevated to the Division 'A' league by competing in the final, with Army SC, under the leadership of Saliya Udugama Chandra, emerging triumphant defeating Air Force SC 4–3.

In 1976, led by Thajone Savanghan, Havelock SC bagged the rugby double, winning the League and Clifford Cup. The next year Havelock SC, captained by Jeff de Jong, retained the league title. In 1978, the centenary year of rugby in Sri Lanka, Havelock SC, led by Anton Benedict, achieved the first ever rugby triple, securing the league title, the sevens and the knockout tournament.

In 1979 Police SC won its first Division 'A' league title, led by Charles Wijewardana, retaining the title the following year, under the captaincy of Nimal Lewke. Havelock SC, led by Angelo Wickremeratne, won the title in 1981, securing the rugby triple by securing the inter club sevens and club knock out competition.

In 1982 Colombo H&FC, led by N. H. Karunasena, successfully secured the league title for the first time in twenty years. As a result of the outbreak of civil war in 1983, Police SC withdrew from the league competition, that year the title was again won by Colombo H&FC.

In 1984 Police SC, captained by Upali Vidanage, clinched the 'A' Division League title, going on to win for a further five successive years until 1989.

=== League championships: 1985 to 1999 ===
In 1985 the rugby league competition was renamed the John Player "Gold Leaf" Rugby Championships, following a sponsorship deal with British Tobacco Company, John Player, and the Sri Lanka Rugby Football Union. The SRFU decided to award the Clifford Cup to the winners of a separate knock-out tournament, conducted amongst the 'A' Division Clubs, held at the end of the regular season. The inaugural winner of the John Player Rugby Championship was Police SC captained by Sunil Sahabandu, who also clinched the rugby triple by also winning the Rugby Sevens title and the Clifford Cup. Police SC subsequently retained the John Player League title for the following four years, under the leadership of Sunil Sahabandu (1985), H. Premasiri (1986), Muruga Jayaratne (1987), Ajantha Samarakoon (1988) and M. H. Marso (1989).

In 1990 Police SC withdrew from competition when the second civil war broke out, with Colombo Hockey & Football Club, led by Imran Salley, clinching the rugby triple by winning the John Player League, Clifford Cup and Premadasa Trophy that year. In 1991 Police SC returned to the league, under the captaincy of Hemantha Yatawara, and secured the rugby double by winning the John Player League and Clifford Cup. In 1992 CH and FC, led by Asitha Boteju, were successful clinching the rugby triple by winning the League Championship, Rugby Sevens and Premadasa Trophy. In 1993 CH and FC, this time captained by Hisham Abdeen, repeated their previous years domination by again securing the rugby triple. In 1994 Kandy SC, under the leadership of Indrajith Bandranayake, secured their first league championship and in 1995 the club won the rugby triple, the John Player Gold Leaf Trophy, Clifford Cup and President's Trophy.

In 1996 the competition was renamed the Carlsberg Rugby League, with the inaugural winner being the Ceylonese R & FC, who led by Viraj Prasantha were unbeaten all season. The following year the league championship was won by Kandy SC, following an undefeated season. Ceylonese R&FC, captained by Champika Nishantha, were successful in 1998, defeating defending champions Kandy SC 21-13 in the deciding game. In 1999 Kandy SC were victorious winning the triple crown, with the runners-up to the league title being Colombo H&FC.

=== Caltex League (2000-11) ===
Between 2000 and 2011 the competition was sponsored by Caltex and was called the Caltex Rugby League. The inaugural Caltex Rugby League champions were Colombo H&FC, captained by Nazim Mohammed, winning 12 out of 14 matches, including a 33-11 victory over the previous league champions Kandy SC, only losing one game and drawing one. This was the last time Colombo H&FC were successful in winning the premiership. The runners-up that year were Ceylonese R&FC.

In 2001 Old Zahirians SC were promoted to the Caltex League, after finishing third in the 'B' division in 2000, the same year as the club won the Lahore International Ten-A-side Rugby Tournament. Kandy SC regained the league title, under the leadership of Nalaka Weerakkody. The club dominated the league for the next ten years securing titles under Pradeep Basnayake (2002), Sajith Mallikarachchi (2003), Radhika Hettiarachchi (2004), Sanjeewa Jayasinghe (2005), Sajith Mallikarachchi (2006), Jeewa Galgamuwa (2007), Sean Wijesinghe (2008), Pradeep Liyanage (2009), Fazil Marija (2010) and Saliya Kumara (2011).

In 2005 the Navy SC withdrew midway through the competition, due to their members military commitments. The Caltex league competition in 2006 was subsequently expanded to a twelve team competition with the introduction of Dimbula/Dickoya from the Central Province, Jawatte Lions from the Western Province and the Galle RFC from the Southern Province. The tournament was split into two grades, with six teams, Kandy SC, Havelock SC, Army SC, CH & FC, CR & FC battling out at the top with the remaining six other teams, Old Zahirians, Police, Air Force in the next tier.

In 2007 a further three teams were added to the Caltex 'A' Division League Rugby Championship: Peterson SC, Kandy Youth, Kurunegala and Combined Universities increasing the number of sides from 12 teams to 16. The eight sides in A1 were Kandy SC, Ceylonese R&FC, Colombo H&FC, Havelock SC, Army, Air Force, Police and Old Zahirians, whilst in A2 the sides included Galle RFC, Dimbula/Dickoya, Jawatte Lions, Peterson SC, Kandy Youth, Kurunegala and Combined Universities. The first-round in 2007 was played from 18 May to 1 July and the second-round from 6 July to 5 August. The top six teams in the A1 first-round competed in the second-round for the Cup, while the last two sides in A1 competed in the Plate with the top six of A2. The remaining four teams in A2 played for the Bowl and were joined by two sides from the 'B' Division (Rudra Rajasingham Memorial Trophy). The Plate final was contested between Air Force SC and Old Zahirians, with Air Force being successful.

In 2008 the competition was scaled back to eight teams, being Kandy SC, Havelocks SC, CH & FC, CR & FC, Police SC, Army SC, Air Force and Old Zahirians. The league champions once again were Kandy SC, with Air Force SC securing the Plate.

Navy SC rejoined the competition in 2009 with the tournament committee deciding to have an eighth place play-off between the Navy SC and the bottom-seeded Old Zahirians SC. The Old Zahirians Sporting Club refused to participate in the play-off game on 7 May and were forced to leave the competition. The Plate champions for 2009 were Police SC.

Kandy Sports Club were successful in 2010, clinching the rugby double, by winning both the Caltex League championship and the Clifford Cup, with Ceylonese R&FC coming second and Police SC securing the Plate championship over Havelock SC.

In 2011 the Caltex League commenced in the 1st week of June, a week after Sri Lanka's Asian Five Nation's match against Japan, with the season ending before September, in order for the national sevens team to compete in the Shanghai Sevens on 4–7 September. During the season the previously undefeated Kandy SC were beaten 29-25 by Navy SC and the title ended up coming down to the last game of the season, where Kandy SC defeated Havelock SC and relegated Navy SC to second place. The 2011 'Plate' champion was Air Force SC.

=== Dialog League (2012-21) ===
Dialog Rugby League logo

In 2012 the competition was renamed the Dialog League after Dialog Axiata, a national telecommunications company, entered into a five-year sponsorship deal with the SLRFU. In the same year the competition was expanded to nine teams with the inclusion of a team from Nawalapitiya, the Up Country Lions. The competition began in June and at the end of the first round, the top four teams were Havelock SC, Navy SC, Kandy SC and newcomers Up-Country Lions SC, who then competed for the league title. The rest of the teams competed in the plate tournament. Havelock Sports Club were the eventual 2012 champions, breaking Kandy's dominance of the league, by defeating them 50–9. It was Havelocks' first league title in thirty-one years. Army SC were successful in the Plate final defeating Police SC 21–19.

The following year a team from Hambantota, the Hambantota Sharks, was added to form a ten team competition. The timing of the season was amended with it now running from November 2013 and concluding in January 2014, as such there was no winner for 2013. The winner of the 2013/14 Dialog rugby league was Navy SC, who defeated Havelock SC in the final game of the season, 20–13, capping off an undefeated season. It was the first time in the club's history that they have won the league trophy. The winner of the Plate for the 2013/14 season was Police SC.

In 2014/15 the Up Country Lions withdrew from the league after only competing for two years, with the majority of their players signing with Ceylonese R&FC. The 2014/15 season's format was also changed, previously in the second round the top six played in the cup category and bottom four teams played in the plate. Instead for the 2014/15 season all the nine teams played both home and away matches in round one and two with the top points scoring team clinching the league title. In January 2015 both the Hambantota Sharks and the Colombo H&FC withdrew from the league competition before the second round commenced, although Colombo H&FC subsequently rejoined, resulting in the second round being contested between the eight remaining teams. The 2014/15 champion was Kandy SC, who despite losing their last match against second placed Navy SC, 12–11, and ending with equal points on the league ladder, scored an overall 73 tries to Navy's 62. Political influence was affecting the game around at this time where former president Mahinda Rajapaksa's sons were putting their political power to turn the game in to their hands.

In 2015/16 the league commenced in November 2015 and was contested by eight teams. At the end of the season, in February 2016, Kandy SC were undefeated and clear winners by two games from second placed Havelock SC, securing the league title for the 17th time.

2016/17 league commenced with 8 teams, with Kandy SC taking the title again, winning 12 games out of 14 in the season.

=== Nippon Paint League (2022-24) ===
Following a dispute with Sri Lanka Rugby, Dialog Axiata pulled its sponsorship of the Club Rugby League Championship a few days before the start of the 2022 season. With no club rugby having been played since March 2020, the Inter-Club Rugby League was relaunched without a sponsor in January 2022. A new sponsorship deal with Nippon Paint Lanka was announced six weeks into the season. Kandy SC were declared the champions for 2022, although the competition was halted due to the 2022 Sri Lankan political crisis with two matches remaining in the season. In 2024 Ceylonese R&FC secured the championship title for the first time in 26 years, by defeating the defending champions, Kandy SC, in the last match of the season.

== Results ==
1985–1995 John Player Rugby Championships

Year	John Player League		
Year	Champion	Runner-up	Ref
1985	Police SC		
1986	Police SC		
1987	Police SC		
1988	Police SC		
1989	Police SC		
1990	Colombo H&FC		
1991	Police SC		
1992	Colombo H&FC		
1993	Colombo H&FC		
1994	Kandy SC		
1995	Kandy SC		

1996–1999 Carlsberg League Rugby Championships

Year	Carlsberg League		
Year	Champion	Runner-up	Ref
1996	Ceylonese R&FC	Kandy SC	
1997	Kandy SC		
1998	Ceylonese R&FC	Kandy SC	
1999	Kandy SC	Colombo H&FC	

2000–2011 Caltex League Rugby Championships

Year	Caltex League		
Year	Champion	Runner-up	Ref
2000	Colombo H&FC		
2001	Kandy SC		
2002	Kandy SC		
2003	Kandy SC		
2004	Kandy SC		
2005	Kandy SC		
2006	Kandy SC		
2007	Kandy SC		
2008	Kandy SC		
2009	Kandy SC		
2010	Kandy SC		
2011	Kandy SC		

2022–2021 Dialog League Rugby Championships

Year	Dialog League		
Year	Champion	Runner-up	Ref
2012	Havelock SC		
2013/14	Navy SC	Kandy SC	
2014/15	Kandy SC		
2015/16	Kandy SC		
2016/17	Kandy SC	Havelock SC	
2017/18	Kandy SC		
2018/19	Kandy SC	Havelock SC	
2019/20	Kandy SC	Police SC	
2021	Postponed then cancelled		

2022–2024 Nippon Paint League Rugby Championships

Year	Nippon Paint League		
Year	Champion	Runner-up	Ref
2022	Kandy SC	Havelock SC	
2022/23	Kandy SC	Ceylonese R&FC	
2023/24	Ceylonese R&FC	Kandy SC	

2024-2025 Mastercard Rugby League Championship

Year	Mastercard Rugby League		
Year	Champion	Runner-up	Ref
2024/25	Kandy SC	Havelock SC	
2025/26	Ceylonese R&FC	Kandy SC	

== Clubs ==
=== Current Division 'A' clubs ===
Locations of Division 'A' teams

**Division 'A' clubs**
Club	Est.	City	Stadium	Capacity	Titles (Last)**
Air Force Sports Club	-	Ratmalana	Air Force Ground Ratmalana	2,000	-
Army Sports Club	1963	Panagoda	Sl Army Rugby Ground	1,000	2 (1975)
**Ceylonese Rugby & Football Club**	1922	Colombo	Longdon Place	5,550	15 (2026)
**Colombo Hockey & Football Club**	1892	Colombo	Colombo Racecourse	10,000	10 (2000)
**Havelock Sports Club**	1915	Havelock Town	Havelock Park	5,000	14 (2012)
**Kandy Sports Club**	1888	Kandy	Nittawela Rugby Stadium	25,000	23 (2025)
Navy Sports Club	-	Welisara	Welisara Navy ground	5,000	1 (2014)
Police Sports Club	1926	Bambalapitiya	Police Park	1,000	9 (1991)

- **Gold** - current Dialog League champion
- **Bold** - original constituent club

=== Former Division 'A' Clubs ===
**Former Division 'A' clubs**
Club	Est.	City	Stadium	Capacity	Seasons
**Dickoya Maskeliya Cricket Club**	1868	Dickoya	Darrawella Club Grounds		-
**Dimbula Athletic & Cricket Club**	1856	Radella	Radella Cricket Grounds		67
Galle RFC		Galle	Koggala Trade Zone Ground	2,000	2
**Kelani Valley Club**	1885	Avissawella	Kelani Valley Club Grounds		-
Hambantota Sharks	2013	Hambantota	Beliatta National Stadium		2
Jawatte Lions	1990	Narahenpita	Shalika Grounds		2
Old Zahirians	1968	Maradana			7
Peterson's Sports Club	1980				
Up Country Lions	2012	Nawalapitiya	Jayathilake Stadium	5,000	2
**Uva Gymkhana Club**	1880	Badulla			

- **Grey** - club now defunct
- **Bold** - original constituent club

== Total wins ==
Updated to the 2021/2022 season:

Club	Wins	Seasons
Kandy Sports Club	23	1994, 1995, 1997, 1999, 2001, 2002, 2003, 2004, 2005, 2006, 2007, 2008, 2009, 2010, 2011, 2015, 2016, 2017, 2018, 2019, 2020, 2022, 2023, 2025
Ceylonese Rugby & Football Club	15	1952, 1954, 1955, 1956, 1958, 1959‡, 1965, 1966, 1969, 1996, 1998, 2024, 2026
Havelock Sports Club	14	1950, 1951, 1961, 1963, 1964, 1967, 1968, 1970‡, 1974, 1976, 1977, 1978, 1981, 2012
Police Sports Club	12	1970‡, 1972, 1973‡, 1979, 1980, 1984, 1985, 1986, 1987, 1988, 1989, 1991
Colombo Hockey and Football Club	10	1957, 1960, 1962, 1971, 1982, 1983, 1988, 1990, 1992, 1993, 2000
Army Sports Club	2	1973‡, 1975
Dimbula Athletic & Cricket Club	2	1953, 1959‡
Navy Sports Club	1	2014

- ‡ Shared

== Players ==
Year	Leading scorers				
Year	Most tries		Most points		Ref.
2012	S. Handapangoda; S. Kunaga (Army SC)	11			
2013/14	S. Herath (Havelock SC)	20	N. Hettiarachchi (Navy SC)	178	
2014/15	A. Naqaliva (Police SC)	12	D. Perera (Havelock SC)	103	
2015/16	P. Madusanka (Havelock SC)	12	T. Weerasingha (Navy SC)	146	
2016/17	D. Ranjun (Kandy SC)	16	D. Perera (Havelock SC)	171	
2017/18	A. Wilwara (Kandy SC)	10	T. Weerasinghe (Navy SC)	198	
2018/19	M. Hapugoda (Havelock SC); S. Sooriyarachchi (Colombo H&FC)	11	S. Maduwantha (Colombo H&FC)	200	
2019/20	J. Dishan (Ceylonese R&FC)	13	T. Ratwatte (Kandy SC)	123	
2021	Season cancelled				
2022/23	P. Madusanka (CH & FC)	9	N. Perera (Airforce SC)	115	
2023/24					
