= Sri Lanka Army Sports Club (rugby union) =

- Full name: Army Sports Club
- Union: Sri Lanka Rugby Football Union
- Founded: 1962
- Location: Sri Lanka
- Ground(s): Panagoda
- Chairman: Gen. Chandana Wickramasinghe
- Coach(es): Shamlie Nawaz
- Captain(s): Maj Manoj Bandara
- League(s): Dialog Rugby League; Clifford Cup
- 2016-17 Dialog Rugby League season: 6

Sri Lanka Army Sports Club is a Division 'A' rugby union team based in Sri Lanka that plays in the Dialog Rugby League in Sri Lanka. It is the rugby union team of the Sri Lanka Army Sports Club and was founded in 1962.

== History ==
In 1961 Army SC together with Division 'B' teams from Air Force, Navy, Police SC and University were permitted to play alongside the Division 'A' clubs, Ceylonese Rugby & Football Club, Colombo Hockey and Football Club, Havelock SC, Kandy SC, Dimbula Athletic & Cricket Club, Dickoya Maskeliya Cricket Club, Uva and Kelani Valley Club in the Clifford Cup competition. The expanded competition, allowed all thirteen clubs to play each other once on a home and away basis in alternate years and at the end of the season the best eight teams went on to play in a knock-out tournament for the Clifford Cup.

In 1973 Army SC, captained by S.P. de Silva, shared the Clifford Cup with Police SC following a 19 all draw. It wasn't until 1975, under Saliya Udugama, that Army SC won the Clifford Cup outright for the first time by beating Air Force SC 4–3.

In 1978 the Clifford Cup was awarded to the League Champions and the knockout competition was played for SLRFU President's Trophy. In 1979 Army SC won the President's Trophy at Galle Face, led by Daya Ratnayake, beating a strong Havelock Sports Club 21–3. In 1981 Army won the President’s Trophy again under the captaincy of John Senaweera.

== Clifford Cup ==
Club	Wins	Seasons
Army Sports Club	2	1973‡, 1975

- ‡ Shared Police Sports Club
