= Sri Lanka Air Force Sports Club (rugby union) =

Sri Lanka Air Force Sports Club (Rugby)
- Union: Sri Lanka Rugby Football Union
- Location: Sri Lanka
- Ground: Ratmalana
- Chairman: Group Captain Subash Jayathilaka
- Coach: Shamlie Nawaz
- League(s): Dialog Rugby League; Clifford Cup
- 2016-17 Dialog Rugby League season: 5

Sri Lanka Air Force Sports Club are a Division 'A' rugby union team, based in Sri Lanka. It is the rugby union team of the Sri Lanka Air Force Sports Club.

In 1961 Air Force SC together with Division 'B' teams from Police SC, Army SC, Navy SC and University were permitted to play alongside the Division 'A' clubs, Ceylonese Rugby & Football Club, Colombo Hockey and Football Club, Havelock SC, Kandy SC, Dimbulla Athletic & Cricket Club, Dickoya Maskeliya Cricket Club, Uva and Kelani Valley Club in the Clifford Cup competition, which was changed whereby all thirteen clubs had to play each other once on a home-and-away basis in alternate years, and at the end of the season the best eight teams went on to play in a knock-out tournament for the Clifford Cup.

In 1972 they were promoted to the Division 'A', Sri Lanka Rugby Championship and by 1975, captained by Shanthi Mendis, Air Force SC, were victorious in 12 out of 16 games at the end of the season entering the final of the Clifford Cup before losing to Army SC in a close game, 3–4. Two years later led by scrum half Ronald Rodrigo, they once again made the final, ultimately losing to Havelock SC.

During the 1980s Air Force SC produced a number of well known rugby players including scrum half Tikiri Marambe, number eight Nalin de Silva, flanker Harsha Fernando, lock Lofty Perera, prop Nilantha Tennakoon and stand-off Tony Wimalasuriya.

In 1986 Air Force SC, captained Lakshman Caldera, won their first Clifford Cup, defeating Police SC in the final with a score of 10–8.

In 1990, the Air Force SC had to withdraw from the game due to the Second Eelam War. The club's rugby revival took place in 1995 under their coach A. Tennakoon, after an absence of four years. Air Force SC won the plate championship for three consecutive years in 1998, 1999 and 2000. The club were the runners up in the Rugby Sevens championship three times in 2006, 2008 and 2010.

In 2021, Air Force SC were crowned as Champions in the Warrior Cup 7s Invitational Tournament. In 2022, the team emerged victorious over Havelock SC in the finals held on 09 October 2022 to clinch the Cup Championship of the Sri Lanka Rugby 7s Tournament.
