= Sri Lanka Police Sports Club (rugby union) =

Sri Lanka Police Sports Club (Rugby)
- Union: Sri Lanka Rugby Football Union
- Founded: 1926
- Location: Sri Lanka
- Ground(s): Police Park (Capacity: 1,000)
- Coach(es): Lalith Weeraratne
- Captain(s): Lahiru Gurusinghe
- League(s): Dialog Rugby League; Clifford Cup
- 2016-17 Dialog Rugby League season: 7

Sri Lanka Police Sports Club (Police SC) is a Division 'A' rugby union team based in Sri Lanka, competing in the Dialog Rugby League. It is the rugby union team of the Sri Lanka Police Sports Club.

== History ==
On 27 January 1881 a team of Police officers participated in a rugby game at the “Kew Garden” Park in Malay Street, Slave Island. In 1891 a team from the Pettah Police Station played a rugby match.

In 1961 Police SC together with Division 'B' teams from Air Force, Army SC, Navy and University were permitted to play alongside the Division 'A' clubs, Ceylonese Rugby & Football Club, Colombo Hockey and Football Club, Havelock SC, Kandy SC, Dimbula Athletic & Cricket Club, Dickoya Maskeliya Cricket Club, Uva and Kelani Valley Club in the Clifford Cup competition. The expanded competition, allowed all thirteen clubs to play each other once on a home and away basis in alternate years and at the end of the season the best eight teams went on to play in a knock-out tournament for the Clifford Cup.

The Police Sports Club was promoted to Division 'A' in 1967 and in the first year they made the Clifford Cup finals, defeating Dickoya MCC in the quarter-final and Ceylonese R&FC in the semi-final before losing the final to Havelock Sports Club 11–3. They won their first Clifford Cup in 1970, under the captaincy of Abdul Majeed, drawing in the final 6–6 with Havelock SC. The club went on to win its first Clifford Cup outright in 1972, when led by Anton Benedict they defeated Colombo H&FC 12–9. In the following next year Police SC participated in another drawn Cup final, this time with Army SC.

The club won its first Division 'A' league title, which was then known as the ‘John Player League’ in 1979, under the captaincy of Charles Wijewardene and retained the title in the following year (1980) led by Nimal Lewke. They were successful again four years later in 1984, under Upali Vithanage, winning the Clifford Cup. Police SC went on to win six consecutive league titles from 1984-89. During this period the club won numerous Sevens wins and clinched the Triple Crown twice. In 1985 under the leadership of Sunil Sahabandu, they were unbeaten in the league, won the Clifford Cup, by defeating Havelock SC 22-16 and were also victorious in the Sevens competition. In 1986 under H. Premasiri they retained the league title, and in 1987 under Muruga Jayaratne they won the league title and the sevens. In 1988 Ajantha Samarakoon captained them to win the double again. In 1989 they enjoyed their most successful season under Hafeel Marso clinching the Triple Crown (the League title, Sevens and Clifford Cup).

In 1990 they were heading the League points table, at the end of the first round but had to withdraw from the competition due to the Second Eelam War. In 1991 under Hemantha Yatawara they won the league and Clifford Cup, their last titles to date. In the last couple of seasons they have consistently won the Plate title but have failed to progress any further.

== Clifford Cup ==
Club	Wins	Seasons
Police Sports Club	8	1970‡, 1972, 1973‡, 1979, 1980, 1984, 1985, 1991

- ‡ Shared with Havelock Sports Club (1970) and Army Sports Club (1973)

== Police Park ==
In 1812 the then Inspector General of Police, Ivor Edward David, acquired 2.6 ha (6.4 acres) of crown land for the Police Department and created the Bambalapitiya Police Park. The sports grounds at Police Park were formally opened on 20 March 1914. The existing pavilion was built in 1928 during the period that Sir Herbert Layard Dowbiggin was Inspector General of Police. The current grandstand was constructed in 1993 and the two left and right wings of the grandstand were completed in 2003.
