= Aruna Rankothge =

Sri Lankan rugby player, rugby referee and coach (1972/1973–2025)

- Full name: Aruna Krishantha Rankothge
- Born: 17 March 1972 or 17 March 1973 Kandy, Sri Lanka
- Died: 10 February 2025 (aged 52) Kandy, Sri Lanka
- School: St. Sylvester's College
- Occupation: Rugby Union referee

Rugby union career
- Position(s): Scrum half, Fly-Half, Full-back
Senior career
| Years | Team | Apps | (Points) |
| 1990–1995 | Kandy SC | | |
Refereeing career
| Years | Competition | | Apps |
| 2010 | Asia Rugby | | - |
| 2010–2011 | Dubai Sevens | | |
| – | Asia Rugby Championship | | |
| – | Bradby Shield Encounter | | |
| 2004–2009 | World Rugby U20 Championship | | |
| 2007 | Asia Rugby Sevens Series | | |

Aruna Krishantha Rankothge (17 March 1972 or 1973 – 10 February 2025) was a Sri Lankan rugby player, rugby coach, administrator and rugby referee.

== Background ==
Rankothge attended St. Sylvester’s College in Kandy for his primary and secondary education. He plied his trade in the sport of rugby by representing his school in school rugby matches for a period of two years from 1989 to 1991. Rankothge died in Kandy on 10 February 2025, at the age of 52.

== Career ==
After finishing his schooling, he forayed his way into the domestic club rugby scene as he burst onto the scene by featuring as a flanker and centre for Kandy Sports Club and Kandy Youth Cricket Club. After announcing his retirement from the game, he propelled his career trajectory into refereeing in 1996. He soon built up a reputation as a most sought-after referee in Sri Lankan domestic rugby circuit, and in 2010 he subsequently earned a spot on the Elite ‘A’ Panel of International Referees of the Asian Rugby Football Union highlighting his work ethic and commitment towards the upliftment of the game.

During his career, he officiated various international matches in Asia, including Dubai Sevens and the Asian Five Nations. He was part of the Asian rugby referees panel and refereed club and school matches, including the Bradby Shield Encounter. He also officiated as a match referee in Singer Sri Lankan Rugby Sevens and Carlton Rugby Sevens and was appointed a referee for the under-20 Junior World Cup qualifying matches held in countries such as China, South Korea, and the Philippines. He was unanimously elected to the position of vice president of the Sri Lanka Rugby Referees Society on multiple instances.

Aruna also announced his arrival as a charismatic coach in rugby arena when he guided his past school St. Sylvester's College to the ‘A’ Division and also played a pivotal part in helping his alma mater to achieve a crucial win against Trinity College in 1998. He also later went onto coach and mentor some Trinity’s junior rugby teams down the line. He also revealed that he had reportedly worked as a Human Resources Executive at Amaya Hills Hotel for a duration of 14 years. He also served as a Human Resources Manager at Sinhaputha Finance PLC for a brief stint.
