= Sri Lanka Army Sports Club =

Sri Lanka Army Sports Club or Army SC may refer to:

- Sri Lanka Army Sports Club (cricket)
- Sri Lanka Army Sports Club (football), now known as Defenders FC
- Sri Lanka Army Sports Club (rugby)
