= Sri Lanka Navy Sports Club =

Sri Lanka Navy Sports Club or Navy SC may refer to:

- Sri Lanka Navy Sports Club (cricket)
- Sri Lanka Navy Sports Club (football), now known as Navy Sea Hawks FC
- Sri Lanka Navy Sports Club (rugby)
