= Sri Lanka Air Force Sports Club =

Sri Lanka Air Force Sports Club or Air Force SC may refer to:

- Sri Lanka Air Force Sports Club (cricket)
- Sri Lanka Air Force Sports Club (football)
- Sri Lanka Air Force Sports Club (rugby union)
