= Dimbula Athletic & Cricket Club =

Coordinates: 6°56′17″N 80°43′14″E

Dimbula Athletic and Cricket Club
- Abbreviation: DA&CC
- Formation: 1856
- Type: Sporting club
- Headquarters: Radella

The Dimbula Athletic and Cricket Club (also known as the Radella Club) is a sporting club formed by British tea planters and founded in 1856. It is the oldest sporting club in Sri Lanka outside of Colombo, with activities including rugby, cricket, squash, billiards, snooker, tennis and badminton.

The club is most synonymous with rugby, as Dimbula A&CC was the only up country club to win the coveted Clifford Cup, in 1953 and again in 1959. This achievement wasn't matched until 1992 when the Kandy Sports Club were successful in winning the cup.

The first up country cricket match was played in 1868 at the club's grounds in Radella against Dickoya, becoming an annual fixture in the region.

In 1878 one of its members, Frank Hadow, a planter who was on Carlabeck Estate, won Wimbledon men's singles.

The club's first official rugby match was played on 7 March 1880 against fellow Up Country club, Dickoya Maskeliya Cricket Club, in Darawella, with Dickoya winning 9–3. Both clubs played a return fixture the next week this time at Radella, where Dickoya were again victorious 3–nil. The annual rugby match between Dimbulla and Dickoya, is one of the oldest rugby competitions in Sri Lanka.

In 1908 the club was one of six founding rugby clubs which formed the Ceylon Rugby Football Union.

In the following year the club introduced Badminton to the country, with its own indoor court, becoming the first badminton club in Ceylon. Dimbula conducted two badminton tournaments annually from 1911 until 1926.

On 17 April 1954 Queen Elizabeth II and her husband Philip, Duke of Edinburgh visited the club as part of their tour of Ceylon, as the country was previously known.

The original Victorian-style club house, with an antique clock on top of the pavilion was destroyed by fire in 1962 and a replacement building was constructed thereafter.

In 1970 the rugby team, led by Ken Murray won the Sri Lanka Rugby Championship, losing only one match during the entire season and that to the Ceylonese Rugby & Football Club at the team's home ground at Radella. The club bowing out of the Clifford Cup losing to Police Sports Club in the competition semi-finals.

With the nationalisation of the tea estates in 1975, the club ceased playing ‘A’ Division Rugby but continued playing in the Up Country League.
