= Dickoya Maskeliya Cricket Club =

- Abbreviation: DMCC
- Formation: 1868
- Type: Sporting club
- Headquarters: Darrawella

The Dickoya Maskeliya Cricket Club (also known as DMCC) is a sporting club formed by British tea planters and founded in 1868. The club house and grounds are situated at the foothills of Darrawella Estate and therefore the club is often called the Darrawella Club.

The first up country cricket match was played in 1868 against Dimbula Athletic & Cricket Club at their grounds in Radella, the ensuing matches becoming an annual fixture in the region.

The club's first official rugby match was played on 7 March 1880 against fellow Up Country club, Dimbula Athletic & Cricket Club, at its home ground in Darawella, with Dickoya winning 9–3. Both clubs played a return fixture the next week this time at Radella, where Dimbula were victorious 3–nil. The annual rugby match between Dimbulla and Dickoya, is one of the oldest rugby competitions in Sri Lanka.

On 14 February 1891 the Tsesarevich, Nicholas II, who later became the Tsar of Russia, visited the Darrawella Club.

In 1908 the club was one of six founding rugby clubs which formed the Ceylon Rugby Football Union.

In 1956 a combined Dimbula & Dickoya rugby team, commonly known as the Dim/Dicks, captained by Malcolm Wright won through to the Clifford Cup final before being defeated by the Ceylonese Rugby & Football Club. The following year the Dim/Dicks, under skipper Malcolm Wright, made the final again only to lose against Ceylonese Rugby for a second time.

In 1958 Dickoya, led by Barry Cameron, successfully made the final of the Clifford Cup for the first time in their own right, losing to Ceylonese Rugby & Football Club. In 1961, under the leadership of M. G. K. Macpherson, they repeated the feat, competing in the final against Havelock, who they eventually lost to 11–9.

With the nationalisation of the tea estates in 1975, the club ceased playing ‘A’ Division Rugby but continued playing in the Up Country League.
