= Radella Cricket Grounds =

Cricket ground in Radella, Sri Lanka

Coordinates: 6°56′N 80°43′E

- Location: Radella, Nuwara Eliya
- Establishment: 1856
- Owner: Dimbula Cricket Club
- Tenants: Sri Lanka Cricket
- End names
- Score Board End; Pavilion End
- As of August 19 2008; Source: CricketArchive

Radella Cricket Grounds is a Cricket ground in Sri Lanka situated in Radella, a village close to Nuwara Eliya, Sri Lanka. The grounds are also known as Dimbula Cricket Club Ground.

== Importance ==
This cricket ground is considered unique, being situated at the altitude of 4,360 ft (1,330 m). Radella Cricket Grounds is one of the few cricket grounds situated 4,000 ft above sea level. Its setting is described as one of the most picturesque cricket grounds in the world.

== History ==
Radella Cricket Grounds is home to the Dimbula Athletic & Cricket Club, which was founded in 1856. The first recorded match played in 18–19 November 1892, between touring Lord Hawke's XI and Up-country XI. Another notable match the grounds played host to was the tour match of MCC captained by future England cricket captain Mike Smith against Up-country XI in 1962.

The grounds have been used as a venue for rugby union by Dimbula Cricket Club. In fact, the finals of the Clifford Cup have been played on the grounds.

== Recent times ==
Probably the ground's most noted game is New Zealand's tour match against the President's XI in 1983/84 tour. Unfortunately, the game was washed out due to rain. But Sir Richard Hadlee said that Sri Lanka is a good place for Swing Bowling owing to higher altitude and cloudy sky.

Since then little cricket has been played here. Four Youth Cricket World Cup matches were played here including the match between Pakistan under-19s versus Kenya under-19s. The MCC's match against Janashakthi Group in 2000/01 is the last notable match played on the grounds.

International Cricket Council helps Sri Lanka Cricket to renovate the grounds.

== List of matches played at the ground ==
=== First Class matches ===
- Sri Lanka Board President's XI v New Zealand - March 5, 1984

=== List A matches ===
- Sri Lanka v Zimbabwe - December 15, 1983

=== Youth Cricket World Cup matches ===
- Kenya Under-19s v Pakistan Under-19s - January 12, 2000
- Ireland Under-19s v Netherlands Under-19s - January 19, 2000
- USA Under-19s v Ireland Under-19s - January 21, 2000
- USA Under-19s v Netherlands Under-19s - January 23, 2000

=== Other matches ===
- Up-Country XI v Lord Hawke's XI - November 18, 1892
- Dimbula and Dikoya v New South Wales - January 15, 1914
- Up-Country XI v Marylebone Cricket Club - February 13, 1962
- Dimbula Cricket Association President's XI v Madras - April 2, 1966
- Dimbula Cricket Association President's XI v State Bank of India - August 10, 1966
- Dimbula Cricket Association President's XI v Hyderabad Blues - April 5, 1967
- Dimbula Cricket Association President's XI v Hong Kong - March 27, 1971
- Nuwara Eliya District v Gloucestershire - April 5, 1987
- Janashakthi Group v Marylebone Cricket Club - March 1, 2001

== See also ==
- Rangiri Dumbulla Stadium
