= Sri Lanka Navy Sports Club (rugby union) =

Sri Lankan rugby union club

- Full name: Sri Lanka Navy Sports Club (Rugby)
- Union: Sri Lanka Rugby Football Union
- Location: Sri Lanka
- Ground: Welisara
- Chairman: Commodore Sanath Pitigala
- Captain: Stephan Gregory
- League(s): Dialog Rugby League; Clifford Cup
- 2022-2023 Dialog Rugby League season: 3

Sri Lanka Navy Sports Club is a Division 'A' rugby union team based in Sri Lanka. It is the rugby union team of the Sri Lanka Navy Sports Club. In 2014 they won the Clifford Cup, for the first time, defeating Havelock Sports Club, 27–22 in the final. Navy SC also completed the 'Grand Double' by winning the Dialog Rugby League Championship with an undefeated season that same year.

== History ==
In 1961 the Navy Sports Club together with Division 'B' teams from Air Force, Army SC, Police and University were permitted to play alongside the Division 'A' clubs, Ceylonese Rugby & Football Club, Colombo Hockey and Football Club, Havelock SC, Kandy SC, Dimbulla Athletic & Cricket Club, Dickoya Maskeliya Cricket Club, Uva and Kelani Valley Club in the Clifford Cup competition. The expanded competition, allowed all thirteen clubs to play each other once on a home and away basis in alternate years and at the end of the season the best eight teams went on to play in a knock-out tournament for the Clifford Cup.

In 1975 they competed for the first time in the "Division A" Rugby League, under the captaincy of P. L. B. Nandasiri. In their first game against the 1974 Clifford Cup champions, Havelock SC they narrowly lost by 13 points to 9. In 1976 Navy SC competed in their first final of the Clifford Cup, captained by Ilex Perera, again losing to Havelock, 15-3. It wasn't until 1989 that Navy SC appeared in their next Clifford Cup final, losing to Ceylonese R & FC, 6-3.

In 2010 and 2011 they again were successful in reaching the Clifford Cup final, falling short both times to Kandy SC. The club's next Clifford Cup finals appearance wasn't until 2014, where they capped off an undefeated league season by also winning the Clifford Cup for the first time in the club's history.
