= Clifford Cup =

Rugby union tournament in Sri Lanka

- Current season or competition: 2026 Clifford Cup
- Sport: Rugby union
- Instituted: 1911; 115 years ago
- Inaugural season: 1911
- Number of teams: 8
- Country: Sri Lanka (SLRFU)
- Holders: Ceylonese Rugby & Football Club (2026)
- Most titles: Kandy Sports Club (23 titles)
- Broadcast partner: Dialog TV
- Related competition: Maliban Inter-Club 'A' Division Rugby League

The Clifford Cup is the most prestigious club rugby knockout tournament in Sri Lanka, and arguably the oldest rugby tournament in Asia. The Clifford Cup commenced in 1911 and has been played continuously since 1950, having completed 79 seasons. The tournament began as a competition between the mercantile executives in Colombo and planters in the hill country.

== History ==
=== 1911–1913 ===
In 1911 Lady Elizabeth Clifford (the wife of the acting Governor of Ceylon, Sir Hugh Clifford) was interested in the annual rugby football fixture, Colombo versus Up Country, and expressed a wish that a match take place in Colombo on her birthday, 26 August, between teams representing the United Services and All Ceylon. Due to unforeseen circumstances the scheduled date was put off by a week and the first Lady Clifford Cup match (as it was originally called) was played on 2 September 1911, with the United Services team defeating All Ceylon 25 points to 0. The All Ceylon team was composed entirely of European expatriates and the United Services team of members of the army and police force. In 1914 the army regiment from which many of the United Services were drawn was transferred from Ceylon following the outbreak of World War I.

=== 1926–1938 ===
The competition was suspended until 1926 due to the war. In 1925 Sir Hugh Clifford returned to Ceylon as the Governor of Ceylon and Lady Clifford, who was keen to revive the Clifford Cup tournament, donated another trophy for the competition in 1926. This time the Clifford Cup was awarded to the winner of a quadrangular tournament between four teams; Low Country, Up Country, Ceylonese and the United Services. The competition pitted the Low Country against High Country teams and Ceylonese against United Services, with the respective winners competing for the cup. The first tournament in 1926 featured, Ceylonese R & FC, a team composed entirely of locally born players. Ceylonese R & FC lost their match against the United Services team, 3–6. The cup was eventually won by Low Country, 14–3, against United Services. The following year Ceylonese R & FC defeated United Services, 16–8, before losing to the cup winners, Up Country, 11–8.

=== 1950–present ===
The competition then continued until 1938, when it was disrupted by the advent of the Second World War. In 1950 the Central Province Rugby Football Union decided to grant official status to the league rugby tournament and the Clifford Cup was converted to an inter-club competition played amongst eight clubs, Kandy Sports Club, Dimbula Athletic & Cricket Club, Dickoya Maskeliya Cricket Club, Uva Gymkhana Club, Kelani Valley Club, Havelock Sports Club, Ceylonese Rugby & Football Club and Colombo Hockey and Football Club. The Havelock Sports Club won the inaugural cup for that year, ending an undefeated season by the club by defeating Dimbula A & CC, 13–0. Havelock SC retained the cup the following year again maintaining an unbeaten record during the season. In 1953 Dimbula became the first club from Up-Country to win the Clifford Cup by defeating the previous years cup holders, Ceylonese R & FC, 6–0. The Kandy Sporting Club made their first appearance in a Clifford Cup final in 1954, where they lost 21–5 against Ceylonese R & FC. The cup was shared for the first time in 1959 when Dimbula and Ceylonese R & FC competed in an 11-all draw.

In 1961 five 'affiliated' rugby clubs, Police, Army, University, Air Force and Navy from Division 'B' were invited to join the tournament and play against the 'constituent clubs', forming a thirteen team competition. The format of the competition was also changed, whereby all 13 clubs had to play each other once on a home and away basis in alternate years and at the end of the league season the best eight teams competed in a knock-out tournament for the Clifford Cup.

In 1985 the rugby league competition was renamed the John Player "Gold Leaf" Rugby Championships and the Sri Lanka Rugby Football Union decided to award the Clifford Cup to the winners of a separate knock-out tournament, conducted amongst the 'A' Division Clubs, held at the end of the regular season.

In 1992 the Clifford Cup final was held in Kandy at Nittawella Stadium, the first time the cup final to be played outside of Colombo since 1957, at which Kandy SC defeated Police SC, by 22–9. On that occasion both Ceylonese R & FC and Colombo H and FC boycotted the competition. The Cup final, since 1992, has been held in Kandy with the exception being in 2006 when it was switched back to Colombo, resulting in Kandy SC withdrawing from that year's competition in protest. On that occasion the cup was won by Ceylonese Rugby & Football Club who defeated Havelock SC, 37–5. In 1998 the SLRFU decided to suspend the competition due to security concerns relating to the ongoing civil conflict however they resolved to reinstate it the following year. Since 2006 the cup final was held continuously in Kandy until 2011 when it was agreed to alternate the finals between Colombo and Kandy.

In 2014 the Clifford Cup tournament was played in February/March, shifting from its traditional dates in the September/October period, resulting in no competition being played in 2013. In 2019 the reigning cup holders, Kandy SC withdrew from the competition after being refused permission to play at their home ground, Pallekele International Cricket Stadium. In 2020 and 2021 the tournament was cancelled due to the COVID-19 pandemic. Due to 2022 Sri Lankan political crisis the league competition was shortened with each team, playing each other only once and the Clifford Cup competition was cancelled for a third year running. In 2023 the tournament returned after a three year hiatus. The competition however was only contested by six teams, with Kandy SC withdrawing on the basis that none of their games would be played on their home ground, and Colombo Hockey and Football Club advising that they would not be able to field a team, due to player injuries and migration. The cup was won by the Ceylonese Rugby and Football Club, their fifteenth win and the first since 2006.

== Trophy ==
In 1911 Lady Clifford consented to provide two cups, which in the event of the Services winning, one would go to the Army and the other to the Navy whilst if the All Ceylon team won, one cup will go to Colombo, and the other to Up Country.

The competition was suspended until 1926 due to World War I and during that time the original trophy was lost or misplaced. Lady Clifford, who was keen to revive the Clifford Cup tournament, donated another trophy for the competition in 1926.

== Teams ==
=== Current teams ===
Locations of Clifford Cup teams

| Club | Stadium | Capacity | Established |
|---|---|---|---|
| Ceylonese Rugby & Football Club | Longdon Place | 5,550 | 1922 |
| Colombo Hockey and Football Club | Maitland Park | 2,000 | 1892 |
| Havelock Sports Club | Havelock Park | | 1915 |
| Kandy Sports Club | Nittawela Rugby Stadium | 25,000 | 1888 |
| Sri Lanka Air Force Sports Club | Air Force Ground Ratmalana | | |
| Sri Lanka Army Sports Club | Diyagama Mahinda Rajapaksa Stadium | | 1963 |
| Sri Lanka Navy Sports Club | Welisara Navy ground | | |
| Sri Lanka Police Sports Club | Police Park | 1,000 | 1926 |

=== Former teams ===
- All Ceylon Rugby Football Club
- Dickoya Maskeliya Cricket Club (established in 1868)
- Dimbula Athletic & Cricket Club (established in 1856)
- Hambantota Sharks (established in 2013)
- Kelani Valley Club (established in 1885)
- Low Country
- United Services
- Up Country Lions (established in 2012)
- Uva Gymkhana Club (established in 1880)

== Results ==
1911–1913

| Year | Clifford Cup | | | |
| Year | Cup winner | Runners-up | Final Venue | Final |
|---|---|---|---|---|
| 1911 | United Services | All Ceylon Rugby Football Club | | 25–0 |
| 1912 | All Ceylon Rugby Football Club | United Services | | 8–0 |
| 1913 | United Services | All Ceylon Rugby Football Club | | 3–0 |

1926–1938

| Year | Clifford Cup | | | |
| Year | Cup winner | Runners-up | Final Venue | Final |
|---|---|---|---|---|
| 1926 | Low Country | United Services | | 14–3 |
| 1927 | Up Country | Ceylonese Rugby & Football Club | | 11–8 |
| 1928 | Low Country | Ceylonese Rugby & Football Club | | 15–11 |
| 1929 | Low Country | United Services | | 23–3 |
| 1930 | Low Country | Ceylonese Rugby & Football Club | | 14–3 |
| 1931 | Low Country | Ceylonese Rugby & Football Club | | 27–6 |
| 1932 | Up Country | United Services | | 14–10 |
| 1933 | Up Country | United Services | | 20–3 |
| 1934 | Low Country | Ceylonese Rugby & Football Club | | 17–0 |
| 1935 | Up Country | United Services | | 11–0 |
| 1936 | Low Country | United Services | | 9–3 |
| 1937 | Up Country | United Services | | 25–10 |
| 1938 | Up Country | Ceylonese Rugby & Football Club | | 10–0 |

1950–1999

| Year | Clifford Cup | | | |
| Year | Cup winner | Runners-up | Final Venue | Final |
|---|---|---|---|---|
| 1950 | Havelock Sports Club | Dimbula Athletic & Cricket Club | | 13–0 |
| 1951 | Havelock Sports Club | | | |
| 1952 | Ceylonese Rugby & Football Club | Uva Gymkhana Club | | 19–0 |
| 1953 | Dimbula Athletic & Cricket Club | Ceylonese Rugby & Football Club | | 6–0 |
| 1954 | Ceylonese Rugby & Football Club | Kandy Sports Club | | 21–5 |
| 1955 | Ceylonese Rugby & Football Club | Kandy Sports Club | | |
| 1956 | Ceylonese Rugby & Football Club | Dim/Dicks | | |
| 1957 | Colombo Hockey and Football Club | Dim/Dicks | | |
| 1958 | Ceylonese Rugby & Football Club | Dickoya Maskeliya Cricket Club | | |
| 1959 | Ceylonese Rugby & Football Club; Dimbula Athletic & Cricket Club | drawn game | | 11–11 |
| 1960 | Colombo Hockey and Football Club | Dimbula Athletic & Cricket Club | | |
| 1961 | Havelock Sports Club | Dickoya Maskeliya Cricket Club | | 11–9 |
| 1962 | Colombo Hockey and Football Club | Army Sports Club | | 6–6 (Note: In 1962 the competition ended in a draw but the cup was awarded to CH&FC on the basis of their unbeaten record during the season.) |
| 1963 | Havelock Sports Club | | | |
| 1964 | Havelock Sports Club | | | |
| 1965 | Ceylonese Rugby & Football Club | | | |
| 1966 | Ceylonese Rugby & Football Club | | | |
| 1967 | Havelock Sports Club | Police Sports Club | Longdon Place | 11–3 |
| 1968 | Havelock Sports Club | | | |
| 1969 | Ceylonese Rugby & Football Club | | | |
| 1970 | Havelock Sports Club; Police Sports Club | drawn game | | 6–6 |
| 1971 | Ceylonese Rugby & Football Club | | | |
| 1972 | Police Sports Club | Colombo Hockey and Football Club | Havelock Park | 12–9 |
| 1973 | Army Sports Club; Police Sports Club | drawn game | | 19–19 |
| 1974 | Havelock Sports Club | Ceylonese Rugby & Football Club | | 16–4 |
| 1975 | Army Sports Club | Army Sports Club | | 4–3 |
| 1976 | Havelock Sports Club | Navy Sports Club | | 15–3 |
| 1977 | Havelock Sports Club | Air Force Sports Club | | |
| 1978 | Havelock Sports Club | Kandy Sports Club | Longdon Place | 10–4 |
| 1979 | Police Sports Club | | | |
| 1980 | Police Sports Club | | | |
| 1981 | Havelock Sports Club | | | |
| 1982 | Colombo Hockey and Football Club | | | |
| 1983 | Colombo Hockey and Football Club | | | |
| 1984 | Police Sports Club | | | |
| 1985 | Police Sports Club | Havelock Sports Club | | 22–16 |
| 1986 | Air Force Sports Club | Police Sports Club | | 10–8 |
| 1987 | Ceylonese Rugby & Football Club | | | |
| 1988 | Ceylonese Rugby & Football Club | | | |
| 1989 | Ceylonese Rugby & Football Club | Navy Sports Club | | 6–3 |
| 1990 | Colombo Hockey and Football Club | Havelock Sports Club | | 4–0 |
| 1991 | Police Sports Club | Colombo Hockey and Football Club | | 13–11 |
| 1992 | Kandy Sports Club | Police Sports Club | Nittawela Rugby Stadium | 22–9 |
| 1993 | Kandy Sports Club | Colombo Hockey and Football Club | Nittawela Rugby Stadium | 18–16 |
| 1994 | Colombo Hockey and Football Club | Ceylonese Rugby & Football Club | Nittawela Rugby Stadium | 15–11 |
| 1995 | Kandy Sports Club | Police Sports Club | Nittawela Rugby Stadium | 16–12 |
| 1996 | Kandy Sports Club | | Nittawela Rugby Stadium | |
| 1997 | Kandy Sports Club | | Nittawela Rugby Stadium | |
| 1998 | No tournament | | | |
| 1999 | Kandy Sports Club | Ceylonese Rugby & Football Club | Nittawela Rugby Stadium | 21–18 |

| Year | Clifford Cup | | | |
| Year | Cup winner | Runners-up | Final Venue | Final |
|---|---|---|---|---|
| 2000 | Kandy Sports Club | Army Sports Club | Nittawela Rugby Stadium | 39–12 |
| 2001 | Kandy Sports Club | Army Sports Club | Nittawela Rugby Stadium | 17–16 |
| 2002 | Kandy Sports Club | Army Sports Club | Nittawela Rugby Stadium | 26–19 |
| 2003 | Kandy Sports Club | Colombo Hockey and Football Club | Nittawela Rugby Stadium | 30–22 |
| 2004 | Kandy Sports Club | Havelock Sports Club | Nittawela Rugby Stadium | 51–20 |
| 2005 | Kandy Sports Club | Colombo Hockey and Football Club | Nittawela Rugby Stadium | 31–6 |
| 2006 | Ceylonese Rugby & Football Club | Havelock Sports Club | Longdon Place | 37-05 (Note: In 2006 Kandy SC withdrew from the competition in protest against the SLRFU's decision to hold the cup final in Colombo.) |
| 2007 | Kandy Sports Club | Ceylonese Rugby & Football Club | Nittawela Rugby Stadium | 16–5 |
| 2008 | Kandy Sports Club | Ceylonese Rugby & Football Club | Nittawela Rugby Stadium | 21–0 |
| 2009 | Kandy Sports Club | Ceylonese Rugby & Football Club | Nittawela Rugby Stadium | 10–6 |
| 2010 | Kandy Sports Club | Navy Sports Club | Bogambara Stadium | 26–11 |
| 2011 | Kandy Sports Club | Navy Sports Club | Royal College Sports Complex | 17–6 |
| 2012 | Kandy Sports Club | Havelock Sports Club | Bogambara Stadium | 7–5 |
| 2013 | No tournament | | | |
| 2014 | Navy Sports Club | Havelock Sports Club | Colombo Racecourse | 27–22 |
| 2015 | Kandy Sports Club | Police SC | Nittawella Rugby Stadium | 77–7 |
| 2016 | Kandy Sports Club | Ceylonese Rugby & Football Club | Colombo Racecourse | 31–28 |
| 2017 | Kandy Sports Club | Havelock Sports Club | Nittawella Rugby Stadium | 32–20 |
| 2018 | Kandy Sports Club | Navy Sports Club | Longdon Place | 21–7 |
| 2019 | Havelock Sports Club | Air Force Sports Club | Colombo Racecourse | 40–21 |
| 2020 | Competition cancelled due to COVID-19 pandemic | | | |
| 2021 | Competition cancelled due to COVID-19 pandemic | | | |
| 2022 | Competition cancelled due to national political crisis | | | |
| 2023 | Ceylonese Rugby & Football Club | Navy Sports Club | Colombo Racecourse | 24–18 |
| 2024 | Police Sports Club | Havelock Sports Club | Colombo Racecourse | 19–12 |
| 2025 | Kandy Sports Club | Ceylonese Rugby & Football Club | Nittawella Rugby Stadium | 41–33 |
| 2026 | Ceylonese Rugby & Football Club | Havelock Sports Club | CR & FC Grounds | 12–10 |

== Total wins ==
The Kandy Sports Club has won the Clifford Cup a record 23 times, including a consecutive period of ten years between 1995 and 2005 (the competition was not held in 1998) and six consecutive years between 2007 and 2012. In 2006 the Kandy Sports Club and Navy SC both withdrew from the tournament (Kandy due to dispute over the ground allocation and Navy as their members were called up for national service duty), the Cup was won by the Ceylonese Rugby & Football Club. The Ceylonese R & FC have won it 16 times, including a tie with Dimbula ACC, Havelock SC have also won 14 times including a tie with Police SC, Police SC eight times with ties against Havelock SC and Army SC, Colombo H & FC seven times, Dimbula A & CC twice including a tie with Ceylonese R & FC, Army SC twice with one tie with Police SC, whilst Air Force SC and Navy SC have only won the cup once.

| Club | Wins | Seasons |
|---|---|---|
| Kandy Sports Club | 23 | 1992, 1993, 1995, 1996, 1997, 1999, 2000, 2001, 2002, 2003, 2004, 2005, 2007, 2008, 2009, 2010, 2011, 2012, 2015, 2016, 2017, 2018, 2025 |
| Ceylonese Rugby & Football Club | 16 | 1952, 1954, 1955, 1956, 1958, 1959‡, 1965, 1966, 1969, 1971, 1987, 1988, 1989, 2006, 2023, 2026 |
| Havelock Sports Club | 14 | 1950, 1951, 1961, 1963, 1964, 1967, 1968, 1970‡, 1974, 1976, 1977, 1978, 1981, 2019 |
| Police Sports Club | 9 | 1970‡, 1972, 1973‡, 1979, 1980, 1984, 1985, 1991, 2024 |
| Colombo Hockey and Football Club | 7 | 1957, 1960, 1962, 1982, 1983, 1990, 1994 |
| Low Country | 7 | 1926, 1928, 1929, 1930, 1931, 1934, 1936 |
| Up Country | 6 | 1927, 1932, 1933, 1935, 1937, 1938 |
| Army Sports Club | 2 | 1973‡, 1975 |
| Dimbula Athletic & Cricket Club | 2 | 1953, 1959‡ |
| United Services | 2 | 1911, 1913 |
| Air Force Sports Club | 1 | 1986 |
| Navy Sports Club | 1 | 2014 |
| All Ceylon | 1 | 1912 |

- ‡ Shared

== See also ==
- Sri Lanka Rugby Championship (Dialog Rugby League)
- President's Trophy Knockout Tournament
