= Kelani Valley Club =

Coordinates: 6.966°N 80.2188°E

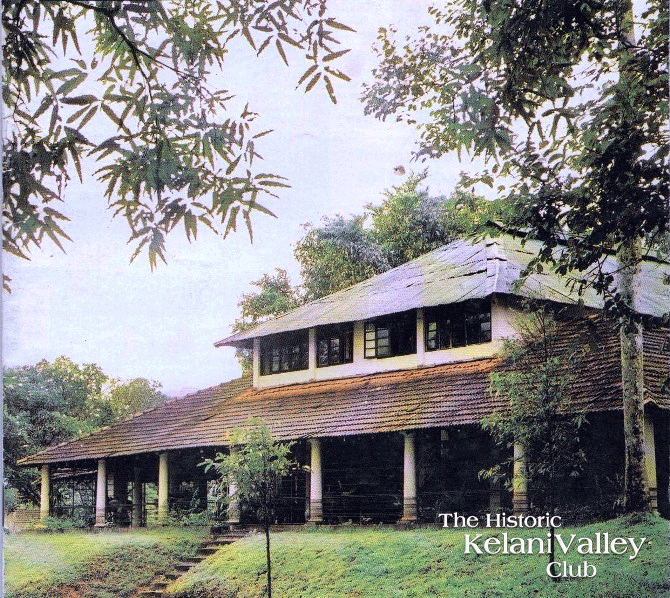
Kelani Valley Club House

The Kelani Valley Club (KV Club) is one of the oldest planter's clubs in Sri Lanka. It is situated by the banks of the Seethawaka River at Avissawella, Sri Lanka. The club was established in 1884 by British planters in the region.

== History ==
The Kelani Valley Club was established in 1884, by low-country Kelani Valley Planters who were mainly European settlers in Ceylon, with F. Duncan as its first president. It is located near the site where Rajasinha I of Sitawaka is reportedly have received a fatal infection from a bamboo shard, whilst returning to Sitawaka from his battle with the Portuguese at Badulla. The club gradually grew from a conventional meeting place to be the centre of fashionable social life, relaxation, entertainment and interaction amongst the British Raj and planters alike. As the KV Club is situated in the heart of the Kelani Valley sub-district, with plantations all around it, planters from near and far used to travel on horseback, or would even opt to walk from their estates to the club, to indulge in social occasions.

The Kelani Valley Club was originally established as a single-storied thatched-roof clubhouse in 1884 and remained so until the 1900s when local planters took over the management. It still retains an authentic Ceylonese-British architectural outlook, in spite of the detrimental 1947 and 1989 floods that rampaged through the low-lying zones and at one point submerged the club. In 1947, flood levels rose as high as 7.6 m (25 ft) and over 4.6 m (15 ft) in 1989. At its inception the members of the club were British, however Ceylonese planters joined the membership and now include those engaged in the Tea, Rubber and Coconut plantations in the Kelani Valley Region and who are executives of Pussellawa Plantations Ltd, Lalan Rubbers (Pvt) Ltd, Bogawantalawa Plantations Ltd, Malwatta Valley Plantations Ltd, Kelani Valley Plantations Ltd, Kegalle Plantations Ltd as well as professionals from the Seethawaka area. During the colonial era it has been famous for its elephant Races, Clay pigeon shooting and Rugby.

During its restoration work another extension was incorporated to facilitate the Billiards, Ladies’ and Committee rooms. Although much was washed away, certain treasures like a war memorial plaque in memory of those members who fell in the Great War between 1914 and 1918 still adorn the club. Also remaining is the elegant teak bar which, as legend recalls, was originally transported by raft down the Kelani River from the Grand Oriental Hotel in Colombo.

The story goes that a British Planter from this region had gone to the Grand Orient Hotel to have a drink and while doing so a colleague had asked him about rubber tapping. This Planter had immediately pulled a Rubber tapping knife and showed his friend how it's done and while trying to do so had damaged the bar for which he was asked to pay damages. (He had made a small cut like shaving the bark of the Rubber tree which is still there). This gentlemen had promptly paid the cost of the bar.

The club's motto is Usque Ad Tertium Diem meaning All the way to the Third Day, an apparent reference to drinking sessions that would begin on Friday, continue following rugby matches on Saturday, and finishing with picnicking on Sunday.

== Rugby ==
The Kelani Valley Club maintains one of the oldest planters’ rugby records in Sri Lanka, dating as far back as 1885 and has been playing competitive rugby since 1890. In 1920 Havelock Sports Club played its first inter-Club match against Kelani Valley.

In 1950 the club was one of the original eight clubs which competed in the Clifford Cup. Although the club never secured the cup during its playing history it did produce more than six national players for the men's teams, as well as ten national women players.

The club currently competes in the 'C' Division Rugby League and in the Sabaragamuwa Divisional rugby tournament.

The clubhouse was originally situated on 8.5 ha (21 acres), which over the years has been reduced to 5.7 ha (14 acres). In 1997 the KV Club grounds and the pavilion were taken over by the Urban Development Authority (UDA), who have plans to construct a modern sports stadium on the land. Now only the clubhouse remains with 0.4 ha (0.99 acres) of land surrounding it. The pavilion which is over 100 years old is currently in a dilapidated state.

== See also ==
- List of Sri Lankan gentlemen's clubs
