= Colombo Hockey and Football Club =

Sri Lankan domestic rugby union club

(Sri Lanka) CH & FC Rugby
- Full name: CH & FC Rugby
- Union: Sri Lanka Rugby Football Union
- Founded: 1892
- Location: Sri Lanka
- Ground: Maitland Crescent
- Chairman: Major Tanesh Dias
- Coach: Rohitha Rajapakse
- Captain: Janidu Dilshan
- League(s): Dialog Rugby League; Clifford Cup

Colombo Hockey and Football Club (also known as CH & FC) is an Division 'A' rugby union team based in Colombo, Sri Lanka, that competes in the Dialog Rugby League in Sri Lanka.

== History ==
The Colombo Football Club was established in 1879, playing their first match against a 'World' Team on 30 June that year. The Colombo Hockey was established in 1892. In 1896, the Football and Hockey Clubs combined to form the Colombo Hockey and Football Club (CH & FC). The club was based at the Colombo Racecourse and catered to Hockey and Rugby (football) enthusiasts. In 1962 when the Army acquired the Grandstand and the racecourse CH & FC moved to their current home at Maitland Crescent. Until 1965 all members and playing members of the club were required to be British, the club then allowed Sri Lankans to join, and it was not until 1971 that the first Sri Lankan captain of CH & FC, Bryan Baptist, was appointed.

== Clifford Cup ==
Colombo Hockey and Football Club, as one of the original eight 'constitutional clubs', first competed in the Clifford Cup in 1950 and have won the cup seven times (1957, 1960, 1962, 1982, 1983, 1990 and 1994). The club's first Clifford Cup occurred in 1957 when the team was led by St. John Davies against the Dimbulla - Dickoya, captained by Malcolm Wright. In 1960 they won their second cup, with CH & FC, captained by Jeremy Lloyd defeating Dimbula Athletic & Cricket Club, who were skippered by Mike Warring. In 1962 CH & FC, led by John Evart, won their third Clifford Cup, despite drawing 6-all with Police SC, captained by Jeff Ratnam, in the cup final, on the basis of their unbeaten record in the league that year.In 1968 CH captained by John Burrows lost to the Havelocks Sports club in the finals played at Longden Place 11-3. In 1972 CH&FC, captained by Y.C Chang, were defeated in the cup final, 12-9, by Police SC, who were led by Anton Benedict. The club's next victory in the Clifford Cup did not occur until 1982 when the team led by N. Karunasena, which was followed by a second consecutive cup the following year, after an unbeaten season. The club's golden years occurred in 1990-94, when in 1990, led by Imran Sally, they defeated Havelock Sports Club 4-0, clinching the triple crown. In 1991 they were unlucky in losing the cup final to Police SC, 13-11. In 1993 they were defeated by Kandy SC in the final, 18-6 before being successful the following year, captained by Nishantha Dias, when they beat the Ceylonese Rugby & Football Club, 15-11. 1994 was the last time the club has held the Clifford Cup. Although they did make the finals in 2003 and 2005, losing both times to the powerful Kandy SC.

== Premier League ==
Colombo Hockey and Football Club were the league champions in 1982 and 1988. In 1990, 1992 and 1993 CH & FC again won the premier league, then known as the John Player League, captained by Imran Sally, Asitha Boteju and Hisham Abdeen respectively. It was not until seven years later, in 2000, that the team, captained by Nazim Mohammed won the competition, this time called the Caltex Rugby League Championship. This was the last time the CH & FC were successful in winning the premiership. In January 2015 the club formally announced that it would be withdrawing from the second round of the Division 'A' league matches, citing lack of funding from the SLRFU and sponsorship, as well as clashes with the domestic cricket season. The club however subsequently changed its decision when the SLRFU promised to bridge any funding gap for the 2014/15 season with Havelocks Sports Club and Ceylonese Rugby & Football Club both agreeing to provide their grounds free of cost for CH&FC's training sessions.
