= Nittawela Rugby Stadium =

Rugby union stadium in Kandy, Sri Lanka

- Interactive map of Nittawela Rugby Stadium
- Location: Nittawela, Kandy, Sri Lanka
- Coordinates: 7°18′59″N 80°38′03″E
- Owner: Kandy SC
- Operator: Kandy SC
- Capacity: 5,000
- Type: Stadium
- Event: Sporting Events
- Surface: Grass

Construction
- Groundbreaking: 1949
- Opened: 1954

Tenant
- Kandy SC

Nittawela Rugby Stadium is a purpose-built rugby union stadium in Kandy, Sri Lanka. It is one of Sri Lanka's most famous rugby venues.

== History ==
Kandy Sports Club's original home ground was Bogambara Stadium until in 1939 the British Colonial Army took it over during the Second World War. The grounds were subsequently handed over to the General Hospital to house their offices. Kandy SC however continued to play rugby at Bogambara but without a club house. In 1949 the Kandy Municipal Council resolved to provide the club with an area of land, a landfill site, at Nittawela. The preparation of the site took approximately five years and it wasn't until 1954 that Nittawela became the permanent home ground for Kandy SC.

In 1992 the gradient towards the entrance was levelled and a new pavilion was constructed, this was followed by the construction of the Central Finance grandstand and a pavilion named after Major General Denzil Kobbekaduwa. In 2004 a further two stands were constructed and were named after two former players Priyantha Ekanayake and Nalaka Weerakkody. A media pavilion has also been constructed and is named after former club captain, Indrajith Bandaranaike.
