= Kandy Sports Club (rugby) =

Sri Lankan rugby union club, based in Kandy

(Sri Lanka) Kandy S.C
- Full name: Kandy Athletic, Boating, Cricket, Football and Dancing Club (formally)
- Union: Sri Lanka Rugby Football Union
- Founded: 1874; 152 years ago
- Location: Kandy, Sri Lanka
- Ground(s): Bogambara Stadium (until 1939); Nittawela Rugby Stadium (Capacity: 30,000, 25,000)
- Chairman: Lasantha Wijesuriya
- President: Mr. Mahesh Weerasinghe
- Coach: Fazil Marija
- Captain: Tharindu Chathuranga
- League(s): Dialog Rugby League; Clifford Cup
- 2025/26 Rugby League season: 1
Team kit

Official website
- www.kandysc.lankapanel.net

Kandy Sports Club (better known as Kandy SC) is a Division 'A' rugby union team, based in Kandy, Sri Lanka, competing in the Dialog Rugby League. The club has been the most successful Sri Lankan club in the Sri Lanka Rugby Championship, winning 18 league titles in the last twenty years, which is the most wins by any club since the expanded competition commenced in 1950. The club has also won twenty Clifford Cups and in the period between 1995 and 2012 the club did not lose a Clifford Cup title, although in 1998 there was no tournament and in 2006 the club withdrew from the tournament. Kandy SC had won the league title for a record nine consecutive years between 2000 and 2009.

== History ==
The Kandy Sports Club was founded in 1874 by a group expatriate coffee planters and others working in the plantations sector in and around Kandy, as the Kandy Athletic, Boating, Cricket, Football and Dancing Club. In 1888, 14 years later, the name was changed to Kandy Sports Club when the club also started playing rugby, hockey and polo. The home grounds was Bogambara grounds until 1939 when the British Colonial Army took over during the Second World War. Later the buildings were taken over by the General Hospital to house its offices, however Kandy SC continued to play rugby at the Bogambara grounds without a club house. In 1949 the Municipal Council released the garbage dumping ground area at Nittawela to the club.

From 1997 to 2009 Kandy SC has won every President's Trophy Knockout Tournament with the exception of the 1998 series, where it lost 26-30 in the final round to Ceylonese Rugby & Football Club (CR&FC).

On March 10, 2010 the rugby team of the Kandy Sports Club left for a 15-day tour of Dubai and South Africa. The club played one match in Dubai and two in South Africa. This was the first time Kandy SC toured two different countries on one tour.

== Stadium ==
- Bogambara Stadium (until 1939)
- Nittawela Rugby Stadium

== Players ==
The Kandy Sports Club was founded by a group expatriate coffee planters, however it has mainly had local players coming in from Kandyan school teams, namely Trinity College, Kandy and tradition in Sri Lanka, Kingswood College which was the first school to introduce rugby in Sri Lanka (by L. E. Blaze, an Old-Trinitian), though it gave up the game soon after and St. Anthony’s College which joined in as a progressive force. Other schools like Vidyartha College, Dharmaraja College and St. Sylvester's College have also had a long history in the sport while producing many players.

=== Current squad ===
The squad as of January 2022

Nigel Ratwatte

Sanushka Abeywickrama

Heshan Jansen

Tharinda Rathwatte

Dilushka Dange

Srinath Sooriyabandara

Chathura Zoysa

Lasitha Attangoda

Ali Mohamed

Charles Praveen

Thilina Bandara

Roshan Weerarathne

Jason Dissanayake

=== Notable Foreign Players ===
- Kitioni Ratudrara - Fiji international.
- Bati Penia - Fiji international.
- Meli Nakauta - Fiji international.
- Viliame Satala - Fiji international.
- Apisai Nagata - Fiji international
- Etonio Quro - Fiji international
- Manasa Qoro - Fiji international
- (Samoa) Tavita Tulagese
- (South Africa) Chris Cloete

=== Notable players ===
The Kandy Sports Club has had some notable players including players who have played internationally and internationals who have played for Kandy. Some notable players include: Sri Lanka skipper and dynamic Anthonian Priyantha Ekanayake with Lakshaman Ekanayake, Indrajith Bandaranayake, Nalaka Weerakkoddy, Leroy Fonseka, Manjula Pathirana, Shyam Sideek, Rizvi Suhaib, Inthi Marikar, Lasantha Wijesuriya, Fijians Kitioni Ratrudradra, Bati Penaia, Tony Greanny and Viliame Satala.

Out of the key expat players over the years Meli Nakauta & Viliame Satala have represented Fiji in the World Cup in 1999, Manasa Qoro in 1987, while Kitioni Ratudrara, & Apisai Nagata have also represented Fiji at the highest level

- Achala Perera
- Amila Bandara
- Ananda Kasthuriarachchi
- Aravinda Udangamuwa
- Bati Penaia
- Buddhi Talagampola
- Chamara Withanage
- Dharshana Ettipola
- Dilip Selvam
- Erande Swarnatillake
- Faizal Marija
- Gayan Ratnage
- Gayan Weeraratne
- Haris Omar
- Inthi Marikar
- Imran Bisthamin
- Indrajith Banaranayake
- Kasun Silva
- Kasun Yasaisuru
- Kishore Jehan
- Kitioni Ratrudradra
- Krishantha Rajapakse
- Kusal Rankothge
- Lakshaman Ekanayake
- Lalantha Karunatilake
- Lasantha Wijesuriya
- Leroy Fonseka
- Malinga Godigamuwa
- Manjula Pathirana
- Mohammed Jabbar
- Mohammed Rizvy
- Mohammed Sabry
- Mohammed Sheriff
- Nalaka Weerakkody
- Navinda Pullukuttiarachchi
- Niranjan Ranasinghe
- Pradeep Basnayake
- Pradeep Liyanage
- Prasad Chathuranga
- Priyantha Ekanayake
- Radhika Hettiarachchi
- Rizvi Suhaib
- Roshan Weeraratne
- Sajith Saranga
- Saliya Kumara
- Sameera Silva
- Sanjeewa Jayasinghe
- Satala Vallimoni
- Sean Wijesinghe
- Senaka Bandara
- Shashika Jayawardena
- Shyam Sideek
- Sumedha Jayasinghe
- Tony Greanny
- Viliame Satala

=== Coaches ===
- Maurice Perera
- Johan Taylor
- Tavita Tulagese
- Neil Foote 2013
- Johan Taylor 2014
- Sean Mark Wijesinghe 2015/16

== Kit manufacturers and shirt sponsors ==
Period	Kit manufacturer	Title sponsor
2000–	Canterbury of New Zealand	Cargills (Ceylon) PLCEtisalat (Sri Lanka)Singer Corporation

== Club honours ==
- Dialog League:
  - Champions: 1994, 1995, 1997, 1999, 2001, 2002, 2003, 2004, 2005, 2006, 2007, 2008, 2009, 2010, 2011, 2015, 2016-17, 2017-18

2018-19

  - Runners up: 1954, 1955, 1969, 1978,
- Clifford Cup:
  - Champions: 1992, 1993, 1995, 1996, 1997, 1999, 2000, 2001, 2002, 2003, 2004, 2005, 2007, 2008, 2009, 2010, 2011, 2012, 2015, 2016

== See also ==
- Kandy Sports Club
