= Havelock Sports Club =

Sri Lankan rugby union club

- Union: Sri Lanka Rugby Football Union
- Founded: 1915
- Location: Sri Lanka
- Region: Western Province
- Ground: Havelock Park (Capacity: 5,000)
- President: Roshan Deen
- Coach: (Samoa) Tavita Tugalese
- Captain: (Sri Lanka) Azmir Fajudeen
- League: Dialog Rugby League
- 2019-20 Dialog Rugby League season: 3

Havelock Sports Club is a Division 'A' rugby union team based in Sri Lanka that plays in the Dialog Rugby League. The club has a long history and rugby is the club's main sporting activity. The "Havies", as they are commonly known amongst its members, is situated in Colombo and the club's ground is known as Havelock Park. The club has produced some excellent players over the last few decades including Sri Lankan Nationals such as Michael Jayasekera, Hisham Abdeen, Graham Raux, Sanjeewa Jayasinghe and Rajeev Ganapathy. The club has struggled over the last decade to retain its players with their star performers crossing over to more star-powered clubs.

This has changed with the help of former Sri Lanka, Ceylonese R & FC fly-half Asanga Seneviratne, who is the current head of the Sri Lanka Rugby Football Union. He has changed the face of Havies Rugby over the last year by helping them find sponsors through companies he controls, which has helped lift the standards of the club on-field and off-field. A new stadium has been built with games being played under lights. Havelocks went on to win the league season in 2012 defeating the Kandy Sports Club, who were the champions for the preceding 10 years.

Havelocks have won the Clifford Cup a total of 14 times, with the latest cup victory in 2019 after a drought of 37 years.

Club	Wins	Seasons
Havelock Sports Club	14	1950, 1951, 1961, 1963, 1964, 1967, 1968, 1970‡, 1974, 1976, 1977, 1978, 1981, 2019

== 2013 ==
Havies came out in the 2013 rugby season as one of the favorites to win the title. They were strengthened by the inclusion of some talented school boys and alongside their experienced players from the 2012 year. They contracted the services of 4 Tongan internationals for the season, namely number 8 Paula Kaho who acted as player-coach, and who was assisted by fellow internationals Hale T-Pole, Daniel Faleafa and Viliami Hakalo (who played for Havelock in 2012). All four represented Tonga in 2013.

=== Notable expat players ===
- (New Zealand) Niva Ta'auso - former Connacht (34 games), Chiefs (16 caps) and Highlanders (9 caps) player.
- Viliami Hakalo - 4 caps for Tonga (3 tries). Former Pro D2 player.
- Paula Kaho - Tonga.
- Nissan Aitui - Samoa U20 international.
- Joseph Wilson Vaka - 5 caps for Tonga.
- Jale Sailasa Salusalu - 5 caps for Fiji

=== Notable former players ===
- Graham Raux - Sri Lanka international.
- Hisham Abdeen - Sri Lanka international.
- Rajeev Ganapathy - Sri Lanka international.
- Hilmy Saheed - Sri Lanka international.
- Sudesh Abheysinghe - Sri Lanka international.
- Chanka Jayaweera - Sri Lanka international.
- Rajive Perera - Sri Lanka international.
- Chamara Vithanage - Sri Lanka international.
- Sanjeewa Jayasinghe - Sri Lanka international.
