= Ceylonese Rugby & Football Club =

Sri Lankan rugby union club, based in Colombo

(Sri Lanka) Ceylonese
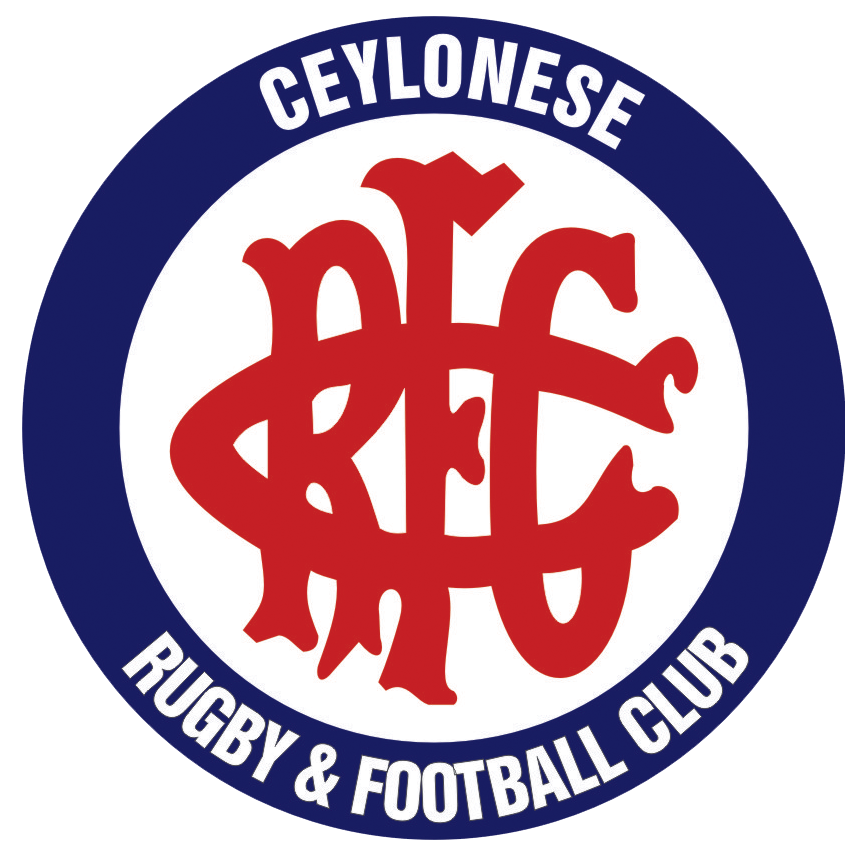
- Full name: Ceylonese Rugby & Football Club
- Union: SLRFU
- Founded: 25 September 1922; 103 years ago
- Location: Colombo, Sri Lanka
- Ground: CR & FC Grounds (Capacity: 5,550)
- President: Hiran Muttiah
- Coach: Dushantha Lewke / Sujani Rathnayake
- Captain: Lasindu Karunathilake
- League(s): Dialog Rugby League; Clifford Cup
Team kit

Official website
- www.crandfc.lk

Ceylonese Rugby & Football Club, also known as CR & FC, is a Division-A rugby union team based in Colombo, Sri Lanka which plays in the Dialog Rugby League. Established in 1922, the club has won the Clifford Cup Knockout Tournament fifteen times, most recently in 2023. Their nickname is the Red Shirts.

== History ==
The club was founded on 25 September 1922 by Colonel Ernest Henley Joseph. It was the first rugby-only sporting organisation in the country at the time. It had its roots in the Nondescripts Cricket Club (NCC), and depended on NCC and Havelock Sports Club for practices and matches during its first four years. Supporters called them the Red Shirts because of their uniform and club colours.

Prominent figures in Sri Lankan society participated in the committee at the inaugural Annual General Meeting in 1923, including members of the Schokman, Rockwood, Saravanamutthu, Weinman, and Ondatjie families. The first captain was L. O. Weinman, and the vice-captain was Rajah Hewavitharana.

After World War I, the Clifford Cup was re-introduced and the CR & FC lost to the United Services team 3-6. The club flourished over the next few decades, with boys from Trinity College, Royal College, Zahira College, St Peter's College, St Thomas' College, and subsequently Isipathana College representing it with distinction. A new clubhouse was opened in December 1964, and the main gate was opened in 1965.

The club also maintains a senior Men's Rugby Union team. Features for members include a billiard room, squash courts, lighted tennis courts, a gymnasium, a swimming pool and an indoor badminton court. CR & FC has had a number of its players play for the Sri Lanka national rugby union team.

== Colours and name ==
The club colours are those of the Ceylon Artillery Volunteer Corps, which was commanded by Col. Joseph. He insisted that the club colours should be the artillery red and blue, and subsequently persuaded the general committee.

== Stadium ==
The club's home ground is CR & FC Grounds. On 29 June 2007 a new pavilion was opened by its primary sponsors, Football Federation of Sri Lanka president Hurley Silveira and Hong Kong and Shanghai Banking Corporation CEO David Griffiths. The new building includes a 500-seat viewing deck, six corporate boxes, two dressing rooms, an outside bar for members and guests, a bar for members, and a restaurant for members and guests.

== Players ==
=== Current Players ===
- Suhiru Anjula Anthony (Captain)
- Kavindu De Costa
- Achitha Radeeshan
- Chamod Anjana Fernando
- Cheka Jayawardana
- Devinda Kumara Rathnayake
- Dilshan Madusanka
- Don Ashen Induwara
- Eranda Harshana
- Gemunu Chethiya
- Kushan Tharindu
- Rinesh Silva
- Rihan Kamil

- Harith Udara Bandara
- Hirantha Manamendra
- Induwara Bimsara Ranathunga
- Jero Dananjaya
- Kalindu Nandila
- Mursheed Zubair Doray
- Thenuka Nanayakkara
- Madusha Kaveen Sri Vikum
- Migara Mihisanka
- Milan Avishaka Manthrigama
- Navindu Madushan Silva
- Pasindu Uthpala Fernanado
- Praveen Sagasekara
- Rasanga Dinushan
- Sachith Pieris
- Sameera Piyumal Buljance
- Saranga Udawatta
- Sarindu Sihasara
- Shehan Eranda Kelaniyagoda
- Supun Warnakulasuriya
- Thisila Devinda Karunatilake
- Tuan Dilshan Jayah

=== Past players ===
1923-1950

- L. O. Weinman (1923-1924)
- A. R. Lourensz (1924-1926)
- J. A. V.Modder (1927-1928)
- C. W. M. Oorloff (1929-1930)
- G. Pereira (1930-1931)
- E. F. N. Gratiaen (1932-1933)
- S. G. De Zoysa (1934-1935)
- E. F. N. Gratiaen (1936-1937)
- R. E. Blaze (1937-1938)
- W. D. Ratnavale (1938-1940)
- N. W. Weerasinghe (1940-1942)
- Vacant (1942-1946)
- F. B. Ohlmus (1946-1948)
- F. E. Keller (1948-1949)
- W. Molegoda (1949-1950)
- D L de Z Wickremasinghe (1938-1952)

1950-1970

- A. Perera (1950-1951)
- M. Rodrigo (1951-1954)
- Summa Navaratnam (1954-1956)
- M. G. Wright (1956-1957)
- G. C. Weinman/A. A. Cader (1957-1958)
- A. A. Cader (1958-1959)
- A. Paiva (1959-1960)
- K. Rambukwella (1960-1961)
- G. C. Weinman (1961-1962)
- G. R. Ingleton (1962-1964)
- R. T. De Sylva (1964-1965)
- S. C. De Sylva (1965-1966)
- E. D. K. Roles (1966-1967)
- M. Azain (1967-1968)
- T. L. Sirimanne (1968-1969)
- M. Sahayam (1969-1970)

1970-1990

- N. H. Omar (1970-1971)
- D. V. P. Samarasekera (1971-1972)
- D. De Almeida (1972-1973)
- K. G. Ratnapala (1973-1974)
- R. Bartholameusz (1974-1975)
- R. W. Schockman (1975-1976)
- I. Coomaraswamy (1976-1977)
- S. H. C. Fernanndo (1977-1978)
- W. R. H. de Soysa
- I. M. De Z. Gunasekera (1978-1979)
- P. R. Balasuriya (1979-1980)
- J. Rudra (1980-1981)
- C. P. Abeygunawardena (1981-1982)
- Sheham Siddik (1982-1991)
- I. Musafer (1982-1983)
- L. RSiriwardena (1983-1984)
- E. M. S. Matthysz (1984-1985)
- K. R. T. Peiris (1985-1986)
- E. Epaarachchi (1986-1987)
- D. T. A. Adihetty/C. Jordashe (1987-1988)
- C. Jordashe (1988-1989)

1990-2010

- P. Ekanayake (1990-1991)
- L. V. Ekanayake (1991-1992)
- L. Gunaratne (1992-1994)
- Shanitha Fernando (1994-1995)
- L. Gunaratne (1995-1996)
- V. Prasanna (1996-1997)
- A. Hensman (1997-1998)
- C. Nishantha (1998-2000)
- S. de Saram (2000-2001)
- K. Musafer (2001-2002)
- A. Rodrigo (2002-2003)
- S. Nawaz (2003-2004)
- P. Fernando (2004-2007)
- Zulfikar Haleemdeen (2006-2007)
- A. Dharmatilleke (2007-2008)
- S. Mohamed (2008-2009)
- Ashean Karthelis (2009-2010)
- Dushantha Lewke (2010–2011)
- Lasitha De Costa (2011-2012)
- Ishan Noor (2013-2014)
- Ashan De Costa(2014-2015)
- Ishan Noor(2015-2016)
- Shane Sammandapperuma(2016-2017)
- Kavindu Perera(2017-2018)
- Omalka Gunaratne(2018-2019)

== General committee (2021–22) ==
- Hiran Muttiah – President
- Savantha De Saram – Deputy President
- Jakque Diasz – Hony. Gen. Secretary
- Zulker Hameed – Asst. Hony. Gen. Secretary
- Ravi Edirisinghe – Hony. Treasurer
- Nuwan De Silva – Hony. Asst. Treasurer
- Tikiri Ellepola – Vice President
- Shanitha Fernando – Vice President
- Chandima Perera – Hony. Bar Secretary
- Hamza Hassanally – Hony. Restaurant Secretary
- Gyan Amarasinghe – Hony. Ground & Pavilion Secretary
- Janinda Dunuwille – Hony. Social & Entertainment Secretary
- Dyan Dunuwille – Hony. Facilities & Infrastructure Secretary
- Savantha de Saram – Chairman Rugby Board
- Janoda Thoradeniya – Chairman Sponsorship
- Shakeel Shamaail – Juniors Representative
- Mano Jayarajan – Chairman Other Games
- Sriyan Cooray – Past President

Past presidents include:

1922-1960

- E. H. Joseph (1922-1935)
- H. K. De Kretser (1936-1947)
- H. N. V. C. Kelaart (1948-1952)
- V. C. Kelaart (1953-1954)
- S. G. De Zoysa (1954-1955)
- J. W. Serasinghe (1956-1957)
- W. D. Ratnavale (1957-1958)
- A. P. Koelmeyer (1959-1960)

1960-1970

- N. W. Weerasinghe (1960-1961)
- P. Ramanathan (1961-1962)
- F. B. Ohlmus (1963-1964)
- W. Molegoda (1964-1966)
- A. E. R. McHeyzer (1967-1968)
- S. Navaratnam (1968-1969)
- M. G. Wright (1969-1970)

1970-1980

- G. C. Weinman (1970-1971)
- R. Rajasingham (1971-1972)
- M. Rodrigo (1972-1973)
- K. Rambukwella (1973-1975)
- A. K. Doray (1975-1976)
- D. Rodrigo (1976-1977)
- T. C. M. Muttaih (1977-1978)
- Percy Perera (1978-1979)
- S. Navaratnam (1979-1980)

1980-1990

- Lalith De Silva (1980-1981)
- N. H. Omar (1981-1982)
- D. V. P. Samarasekera (1982-1983)
- D. De Almeida (1983-1984)
- Ifthikar Cader (1984-1985)
- S. H. C. Fernando (1985-1986)
- U.N. Gunasekera (1986-1990)

1991–present

- S. R. P. Samarasekera (1991-1992)
- R. T. De Sylva (1993-1994)
- G. Manik Pereira (1995-1996)
- D. M. Balasuriya (1996-1997)
- C. J. Fernando (1998-1999)
- E. M. S. Matthysz (2000-2002)
- C. Dharmadasa (2003-2004)
- R. N. Balasuriya (2005-2008)
- Jehan CanagaRetna (2009-2010)
- Rienzie Fernando (2011-2012)
- Christopher Jordash (2013-2014)
- Ravi Guneratne

== Honours ==
The club was the 2013 Plate and Shield Champion in the SLRFU Sevens Tournament. In 2007 it was a runner-up in the Caltex League Tournament, and in 2006, 2008, 2009, and 2010 it was a runner-up in the Dialog Rugby League. The club was a runner-up in the 2008 Clifford Cup and the winner in 1954–1959, 1964–1966, 1987–1989, 2006 and 2023. It was also the champion of the President's Trophy Knockout Tournament in 1977, 1983, 1990–1994 and 2007.
