= List of Kingswood College, Kandy alumni =

This is a list of alumni of Kingswood College, Kandy in Sri Lanka, often called "Old Kingswoodians".

== Politics ==
Name	Notability	Reference
Allan Morley Spaar	Ceylonese public servant and local politician, and the Mayor of Kandy (1940–1942)	
J. P. Jayasena	Senator	
Anuradha Dullewe Wijeyeratne	Sabaragamuwa Provincial Councilor (1988–1993), acting Diyawadana Nilame – Temple of the Tooth (1975–2005)	
Salinda Dissanayake	Member of Parliament – Kurunegala (1994–2019)	
Earl Gunasekara	Member of Parliament – Polonnaruwa (2000–2015)	

== Military ==
Name	Notability	Reference
Rohan Amerasekera	Air Vice-Marshal, Third Commander of the Royal Ceylon Air Force (1972–1974)	

== Public Services ==
Name	Notability	Reference
Kamal Chunchie	Pastor and anti-racist community activist	
Charles Godakumbura	Commissioner of Archaeology in Ceylon (1956–1967)	
Victor A. Nicholas	Postmaster General of Ceylon (1951–1956)	

== Academics ==
Name	Notability	Reference
Sarath Amunugama	Founding Vice-Chancellor of the University of the Visual & Performing Arts, Colombo	
K. M. de Silva	Academic, historian and author	
G.C. Mendis	Historian and author	
Rizwe Mohammed	President of The All Ceylon Jamiyyathul Ulama	

== Film Industry ==
Name	Notability	Reference
Ruwan Costa	Film director, Cinematographer and Cameraman	

== Arts ==
Name	Notability	Reference
Sanath Gunathilake	Actor	
Sanath Wimalasiri	Actor	
Dhanith Sri	Singer	
R. R. Samarakoon	Dramatist	

== Sports ==
Name	Notability	Reference
Indika Dissanayake	Weightlifter	
Chethiya Wadugodapitiya	Rugby union Player	
Suwanji Madanayake	First Class Cricketer	
Fazil Marija	Rugby Union Player	
Freddie White	Hockey Player	
Ransilu Jayathilake	Powerlifter	
