= Randles Hill =

- Location within Sri Lanka

Highest point
- Coordinates: 07°16′43.1″N 80°37′5.1″E

Geography
- Location: Kandy, Sri Lanka

Randles Hill is a hill located in the suburb of Mulgampola in Kandy, Sri Lanka.

== History ==
Randles Hill, earlier known as Solomon’s Garden, received its name when Sir John Scurrah Randles (1875–1945) generously donated the money (Rs. 50,000) through the Wesleyan Methodist Missionary Society to purchase a significant land parcel for the relocation and construction of Kingswood College. Randles was a prominent Methodist, English parliamentarian, and philanthropist. His notable gift followed a visit to the district by Rev. William Goudie (1857–1922) and Robert Simpson, a leading figure in the laymen's missionary movement, who upon returning to England persuaded Randles of the value of such a contribution. Randles subsequently donated a further Rs. 180,626 for the construction of the college buildings. The land, once known as Solomon’s Garden, was renamed Randles Hill by the founder of Kingswood College, Louis Edmund Blaze.

== Randles Hill Railway Station ==
Randles Hill Railway Station is the second school based railway station in Sri Lanka. The first such railway station is at Richmond Hill, which services Rippon College and Richmond College in Galle.

The Randles Hill station is actually a railway halt located on the Matale Line, close to the level crossing at Mulgampola, between Peradeniya Junction and Kandy railway station.
