= Frederick White =

Frederick or Fred White may refer to:

== Music ==
- Freddie White (born 1951), Irish singer-songwriter
- Fred White (musician) (1955–2023), American musician with Earth, Wind & Fire

== Politics and law ==
- Fred White (marshal) (c. 1849–1880), young lawman and the first town marshal of Tombstone, Arizona
- Frederick Edward White (1844–1920), U.S. representative from Iowa
- Frederick D. White (1847–1918), Canadian politician
- Fred J. White (1886–1967), provincial level politician and labour activist in Canada
- Fred White (politician) (1927–1973), Australian politician

== Sports ==
- Fred White (Australian footballer) (1877–1907), Australian rules footballer for Geelong
- Fred White (footballer, born 1880) (1880–?), English football player for Luton Town
- Fred White (footballer, born 1916) (1916–2007), English football goalkeeper for Sheffield United and Lincoln City
- Fred White (ice hockey), Stanley Cup champion with Ottawa Silver Seven
- Fred White (rugby league), New Zealand rugby player
- Fred White (sportscaster) (1936–2013), American sportscaster
- Freddie White (field hockey) (1930–2022), Ceylonese field hockey player and footballer

== Other ==
- Death of Frederick John White (1819–1846), British soldier
- Fred M. White (Frederick Merrick White, 1859–1935), British writer
- Frederick Manson White (1863–1952), American architect
- Sir Fred White (physicist) (Frederick William George White, 1905–1994), New Zealand-born Australian physicist and ornithologist
- Frederick Van Cortlandt White (1767–1859), British Army general

== See also ==
- Frederick Whyte (1883–1970), British civil servant and writer
- Frederick Methvan Whyte (1865–1941), mechanical engineer
