= Wadugodapitiya =

Wadugodapitiya (Sinhala: වඩුගොඩපිටිය, romanized: Vaḍugoḍapiṭiya) is a Sinhalese surname. Notable people with the surname include:

- Chethiya Wadugodapitiya (born 1991), Sri Lankan rugby union player
- S. W. B. Wadugodapitiya, Sri Lankan puisne justice of the Supreme Court (1991–2002)
