= Shenuki Dishalya =

Sri Lankan powerlifter, gymnast and diver

Shenuki Dishalya Wijesiri (born 24 December 2002) is a Sri Lankan powerlifter, gymnast and diver.

== Biography ==
Shenuki was born on 24 December 2002 as the middle child in a family of five siblings. Her father served as a journalist and her mother was an author. She pursued keen interest in diving and gymnastics at an early age. She attended Louver International College, Pannipitiya and she later switched to Bishop's College, Colombo for her primary and secondary education. She was known by many in her close social circles to be a shy personality off the field, despite her strong perseverance, grinding herself to engage in intense powerlifting and weightlifting training.

== Career ==
She began powerlifting at the age of 17 years. She was introduced to the sport by Ransilu Jayathilake and she gained substantial training at CrossFit Colombo under the guidance of Ransilu. Her introduction to powerlifting came as a serendipitous occasion, as she initially enrolled at the CrossFit Colombo with the firm intention and scope of enhancing her fitness and muscle strength for gymnastics. Her talent was spotted by Mothilal Jayathilake who recommended Ransilu Jayathilake to have an eye on Shenuki's capabilities and about the potential to level up Shenuki to take up powerlifting. In 2018, she emerged triumphant as the under 17 diving champion at the SLSRFA MILO 45th Schools Age Group Swimming & Diving Championship.

She rose to prominence and limelight following her medal success at the 2021 Asian Weightlifting Championships. During the 2021 event, she clinched gold medals in the women's 47 kg weight class, deadlift (105 kg), bench press (42 kg) and squat (85 kg) classification events as well as the overall gold medal. She eventually became the youngest Sri Lankan to achieve overall gold medal-winning performance in the competition's history at the age of 18. She actively engaged in intensive training sessions prior to competing at her maiden international powerlifting competition during the 2021 Asian Classic Equipped Bench Press and Powerlifting Championship held in Istanbul, Turkey.
