= Rippon College =

Coordinates: 6°3′10.37″N 80°12′17.01″E

Rippon Girls' College Galle
- Galle; Sri Lanka

Information
- Type: Public and National School
- Religious affiliation: Methodist
- Established: 1817
- Founder: John McKenny
- Principal: Dr. J. Renuka Pathirana
- Grades: Class 1 - 13
- Gender: Female
- Age: 6 to 19
- Enrollment: 2,550+
- Colours: Blue and gold
- Affiliations: Methodist Church in Sri Lanka
- Website: http://www.rippongirlscollege.sch.lk

Rippon College is the oldest girls' school in Southern Province, Sri Lanka. The school was established in 1817 by the Rev. John McKenny as the female branch or department of the 2nd Wesleyan English School in Ja koratuwa, Megalle, Galle in 1817.Methodist missionaries at Richmond Hill, Galle. At the beginning the school was the Galle Girls' School. in 1857, the school was moved to Richmond Hill along with Galle School and several branch schools and was called the Richmond Hill Girls' Boarding school. In 1876, the Rev George Baugh separated it from the boys' school and renamed it as the Whitfield Road School for Girls, and later it was again renamed in honour of the Rev. Joseph Rippon who founded the Richmond Hill circuit and served as the Superintendent Missionary of Galle in Ceylon during the period of 1850 to 1860. The school presently provides primary and secondary education to girls aged 6 to 19 and has a student population of around 2,550.

== History and origins ==
The first school for girls in Southern Province was established in 1817 by the Methodist Missionary Rev. John McKenny at Magalle on 1 December 1817 as the female branch or department of the second Wesleyan English School in Ja Koratuwa, Circular Road, Magalle, Galle. It was simply the female school of The Galle School (which was later upgraded as a high school and was renamed Richmond College) in the beginning. The school was moved to Seymour's Hill, in 1858 when The Galle School and several branch schools were relocated (by then known as Richmond Hill). The school was then called the Richmond Hill Girls' Boarding School in 1861, and in 1871 the school was separated from The Richmond Hill Boys' School (which was known as The Galle School since its inception in 1814). It was then renamed by the Rev. George Baugh as the Whitfield Road School for Girls, but later it was renamed in honour of the Rev. Joseph Rippon who purchased the Richmond Hill and served in Galle as the Superintending Missionary from 1850 to 1860. After the Richmond College was upgraded as a High School, Rippon too was upgraded in 1876. Until Miss Eastwood came as the principal towards the end of May 1876, the Rev. Samuel Langdon of Richmond and Mrs. Langdon looked after the school.

== Past Principals ==
- 1871-
- 1876 - Ms. Ellen Eastwood
- 1878 - Ms.Tebb
- 1882 - Ms. Wilkin
- 1889 - Ms.Trigs
- 1893 - Ms. Hartley
- 1896 - Ms. Oliver
- 1897 - Ms. Prince
- 1905 - Ms. Tebb
- 1907 - Ms. Ward
- 1910 - Ms. Wightman
- 1914 - Ms. Allen
- 1914 - Ms. Bamford
- 1938 - Ms. Williams
- 1943 - P. C. R. Perera
- 1949 - Lesly
- 1954 - M. A. Perera
- 1958 - W. Stembo
- 1966 - D. W. Windsor Godawatta
- 1972 - G. Daniel
- 1976 - N. D. B. Senevirathne
- 1987 - V. G. U. J. Gunasekara
- 1999 - W. S. Ranasinghe
- 2003 - K. D. S. Mangalika
- 2003 - P. N. Rajapaksha
- 2010 - K. N. Ashoka
- 2011 - P. N. Rajapaksha
- 2014 - Devika Sirisooriya
- 2014 - M. S. R. Iranganie
- 2023 - D. L. Ginige
- 2025 - J. Renuka Pathirana

== Houses ==
The school houses are named after four past principals of the school.

- Prince -
- Ward -
- Tebb-
- Wightman -

== Notable Alumni ==
- Wijeyananda Dahanayake
- Nelka Shiromala

== See also ==
- List of the oldest schools in Sri Lanka
