= Nelka Shiromala =

Sri Lankan boxing referee

Personal information
- Born: 22 January 1976 (age 49)
- Education: Rippon Girls' College, Galle

Sport
- Sport: Shooting; Boxing

Thambu Nelka Shiromala also known as Nelka Shiromala Thampu (born 22 January 1976) is a Sri Lankan police officer, boxing referee and former national boxer. Nelka is widely regarded as the first Sri Lankan female boxing referee. She has officiated in several local and international boxing matches as referee. She was also selected by the International Olympic Committee as one of the referees for the boxing competition at the 2020 Summer Olympics. She is regarded as one of the early pioneers of the women's boxing in Sri Lanka when it was originally introduced in the country in 2000s. She is nicknamed as "queen of the ring" in the boxing arena.

== Biography ==
She was born as the eldest child in her family and has three younger sisters. She was born to a Tamil father and Sinhalese mother. She pursued her primary and secondary education at the Rippon Girls' College in Galle. Her father Thambu Sampath was also a boxer who also served as a boxing coach of Sri Lanka Navy. She married fellow batchmate Chandana Wickremanayake who also serves in Sri Lanka Police. In June 2021, his father died due to a heart attack when she was officiating in a European Olympic qualifying competition in Paris.

== Career ==
She joined the Sri Lanka Police in 1997 as a trainee sub inspector. She was transferred to Vavuniya, Northern Province in her first year with Sri Lanka Police during the height of civil war which mainly prevailed in the Northern Province. She excelled in shooting after joining the Sri Lanka Police. She was adjudged as the best police shooter in pistol firing category in 1997 and in 1998. She decided to pursue her career in boxing in 2001 after being advised and encouraged by his father to do so. Her father was also her first boxing coach.

She also mastered the skills of boxing in addition to shooting while representing Sri Lanka Police boxing team from 2002 to 2006. She became the first Sri Lankan female police boxer. She also became the first Sri Lankan woman police officer to compete in international boxing competitions. She also emerged as runners-up in Boxing National Championships for five consecutive years and earned the Best Loser's award.

She also served as a UN peacekeeper for a brief stint in Dakar, Senegal. She later became a boxing referee in 2009 and was elevated as a Level I boxing in 2011. She made her International debut as a boxing referee at the 2011 Indonesian President's Cup and became the first Sri Lankan female boxing referee to officiate internationally. She also officiated in an Olympic test event in 2011 and was promoted as a Level II referee within six months of international refereeing when she officiated during the London Olympic Trials.

She became the first female 3-star referee in South Asian as well as South East Asian Region in 2013. She is currently regarded as the only Sri Lankan 3-star woman boxing official. She officiated at the 2014 AIBA Women's World Boxing Championships which was held in South Korea. She was also chosen as the only female referee during the 2015 Asian Women's Amateur Boxing Championships final in Thailand. She also qualified as a World Series Boxing referee.

She received the Best Referee Award in 2017 from the Asian Boxing Confederation and became the first woman to receive the award. She was also selected to officiate at the 2018 Commonwealth Games and 2019 AIBA World Boxing Championships. During the Gold Coast Commonwealth Games, she became the first Sri Lankan boxing referee to officiate at the Commonwealth Games.

She officiated in few matches of the 2020 Tokyo Olympics and became the first Sri Lankan female boxing referee to officiate at the Olympics. She officiated in the men's light heavyweight final and women's lightweight final of the 2020 Summer Olympics. She also became the first Sri Lankan boxing referee to have officiated in two boxing event finals of the Olympics. She also became the second Sri Lankan boxing referee to officiate at the Olympics after Dharmasiri Weerakoon. She is currently attached with Kollupitiya police station as a chief inspector.
