= Weightlifting at the 2006 Asian Games – Men's 94 kg =

Men's 94 kg at the 2006 Asian Games
- Venue: Al-Dana Banquet Hall
- Date: 5 December 2006
- Competitors: 13 from 12 nations

Medalists
gold medal	Ilya Ilyin	Kazakhstan
silver medal	Lee Ung-jo	South Korea
bronze medal	Hsieh Wei-chun	Chinese Taipei

The men's 94 kilograms event at the 2006 Asian Games took place on December 5, 2006 at Al-Dana Banquet Hall in Doha.

== Schedule ==
All times are Arabia Standard Time (UTC+03:00)

Date	Time	Event
Tuesday, 5 December 2006	19:00	Group A

== Records ==
Prior to this competition, the existing world, Asian and Games records were as follows.

World Record	Snatch	Akakios Kakiasvilis (GRE)	188 kg	Athens, Greece	27 November 1999
World Record	Clean & Jerk	Szymon Kołecki (POL)	232 kg	Sofia, Bulgaria	29 April 2000
World Record	Total	World Standard	417 kg	—	1 January 1998
Asian Record	Snatch	Kourosh Bagheri (IRI)	187 kg	Sydney, Australia	24 September 2000
Asian Record	Clean & Jerk	Ilya Ilyin (KAZ)	225 kg	Hangzhou, China	2 June 2006
Asian Record	Total	Kourosh Bagheri (IRI)	407 kg	Antalya, Turkey	9 November 2001
Games Record	Snatch	Bakhyt Akhmetov (KAZ)	185 kg	Busan, South Korea	8 October 2002
Games Record	Clean & Jerk	Bakhyt Akhmetov (KAZ)	215 kg	Busan, South Korea	8 October 2002
Games Record	Total	Bakhyt Akhmetov (KAZ)	400 kg	Busan, South Korea	8 October 2002

== Results ==
Rank	Athlete	Group	Body weight	Snatch (kg)				Clean & Jerk (kg)				Total
Rank	Athlete	Group	Body weight	1	2	3	Result	1	2	3	Result	Total
1st place, gold medalist(s)	Ilya Ilyin (KAZ)	A	93.93	162	166	171	171	205	215	226	226	397
2nd place, silver medalist(s)	Lee Ung-jo (KOR)	A	93.46	160	165	~~170~~	165	195	200	205	205	370
3rd place, bronze medalist(s)	Hsieh Wei-chun (TPE)	A	93.51	153	~~157~~	157	157	191	197	198	198	355
4	Ramzi Al-Mahrous (KSA)	A	93.69	153	~~158~~	158	158	~~193~~	193	197	197	355
5	Yuriy Galkin (KAZ)	A	92.25	150	155	~~158~~	155	180	194	~~201~~	194	349
6	Oleg Alborov (UZB)	A	90.31	~~155~~	155	~~160~~	155	~~190~~	190	~~200~~	190	345
7	Ruslan Kapaev (KGZ)	A	92.44	150	~~160~~	~~160~~	150	186	191	~~197~~	191	341
8	Yuki Hiraoka (JPN)	A	92.42	145	~~150~~	~~150~~	145	185	190	~~196~~	190	335
9	Hassan Aslam (PAK)	A	93.93	135	~~140~~	140	140	160	~~170~~	170	170	310
10	Ransilu Jayathilake (SRI)	A	93.87	115	120	123	123	155	160	165	165	288
11	Sakher Qalaja (PLE)	A	91.64	110	~~118~~	118	118	140	150	157	157	275
12	Adnan Jlaylatie (LIB)	A	93.44	120	~~125~~	125	125	~~145~~	145	150	150	275
13	Zahir Al-Sinaidi (OMA)	A	92.35	111	~~115~~	116	116	146	~~154~~	~~154~~	146	262

== New records ==
The following records were established during the competition.

Clean & Jerk	226	Ilya Ilyin (KAZ)	AR
