= Ramya Wanigasekara =

Sri Lankan actress and dramatist (1950–2024)

- රම්‍යා වනිගසේකර
- Born: 17 July 1950; Kotiyakumbura, Ceylon
- Died: 8 March 2024 (aged 73); Colombo, Sri Lanka
- Education: Pindeniya Vidyachakrawarthi Central College
- Occupations: Actress, dubbing artist
- Years active: 1974–2024
- Spouse: R. R. Samarakoon (m. 1987; died 2010)
- Children: One daughter

Ramya Wanigasekara (Sinhala: රම්‍යා වනිගසේකර; 17 July 1950 – 8 March 2024) was an actress in Sri Lankan cinema, theatre and television. A pioneer of Sri Lankan radio, she was a Radio Ceylon news reader for more than two decades. She was also a playback singer.

Wanigasekara died on 8 March 2024, at the age of 73, while undergoing treatment at the Colombo National Hospital.

== Early life ==
Wanigasekara was born on 17 July 1950 in Kotiyakumbura, Kegalle as the fifth child in a family of seven siblings. Her father, from Hettimulla, Kegalle was an estate superintendent and her mother was from Eheliyagoda. Ramya had two elder sisters, two elder brothers and two younger brothers. She started primary education at Ampe Maha Vidyalaya, Kotiyakumbura. After attending Pindeniya Vidyachakrawarthi National College, she finally completed her education at Ruwanwella Royal College.

== Career ==
Wanigasekara entered drama as a stage playback singer with the 1974 stage play Hewayo produced by Chandi Gunathilake. After that she became the background singer in many stage plays produced by Jayatissa Alahakoon. In 1976, she first acted in Ranjith Dharmakeerthi's play Hasthiraja Mahaththaya with a minor role. After that she got the opportunity to sing background songs for Dharmakeerthi's play Angara Ganga Gala Basi with music composition by Premasiri Khemadasa. She also acted in that play in some accidental moments.

In 1978, her breakthrough in stage drama came through the play Mana Ranjana Weda Warjana directed by Chula Kariyawasam with the role "Gunawathi". At that time veteran actress Chandra Kaluarachchi was pregnant, and so her role "Matilda" in Kelani Palama was given to Wanigasekara by producer and future husband R. R. Samarakoon. Then, she acted in Samarakoon's plays Ahasin Watunu Minissu (1971), Idama (1975), Jailer Unnahe (1986), Doowili (1990) and Raja Kathawa (1991). Later she acted in a number of plays including Sanda Kinduri, Muhudu Puththu, Ma Hene Reeri Yaka,Liyathambara, Siri Sangabo and Hiru Nathi Lowa. She played the role "Matilda" in Kelani Palama for 41 consecutive years.

In 1980, she joined Radio Ceylon to host the programme Thakshilawa. The programme contained poetry, singing, drama, and news. Beginning in 1981, she was a regular news anchor until she retired in 2006. Later, in 2008 she worked on a contract basis at the Sri Lanka Broadcasting Corporation and worked as a relief newscaster. She was also Radio A-Grade Nurti singer.

In 1983, Wanigasekara was also a member of the first drama group of Dharmasena Pathiraja's documentary Gangulen Egodata on epilepsy. The play won a gold medal at a documentary competition in Germany. Later, she acted in many critically acclaimed roles in television serials such as Kande Gedara, Palingu Menike, Menik Nadiya Gala Basi, Denuwara Menike, Paba, Aluth Gedara and comedy sitcom Yes Boss. Her role in Dhamma Jagoda's Palingu Menike became the milestone in her teledrama career.

On 26 October 2019, the 40th Anniversary of the stage play Kelani Palama was celebrated at the Panibharatha Hall of the University of the Aesthetics at 3.30 pm with the title 40 Wasaraka Rangabhinandanaya. The play was first staged on 25 October 1978 at the Lumbini Theatre. In 2019, The Janabhimani or Hela Maha Rawana Rajabhimani Awards Ceremony was held at the Jasmine Auditorium at the BMICH where Wanigasekara won the Best Service Award.

== Personal life ==
Wanigasekara was married to dramatist R. R. Samarakoon. The affair started during the stage play Kelani Palama. The couple had one daughter, Buddhika Mudithani. Buddhika acted in Kelani Palama in little age as "Surangani". She excelled at stage costume designing.

== Filmography ==
Year	Film	Role	Ref.
1982	Ridee Nimnaya	Chandani	
1995	Maruthaya	Geetha's Aiyya's wife	
2010	Tikiri Suwanda	Tikiri's granny Rosalin	
2014	Ko Mark No Mark	Rupika's mother	
2016	Sarigama	Dalcy	
2024	Weerya	Laticia	

=== Selected television series ===
- Adungira
- Ahankara Nagare
- Ahas Gawwa
- Aluth Gedara
- Ammawarune
- Denuwara Menike
- Divithura
- Gangulen Egodata
- Indi Weta Addara
- Kande Gedara
- Koombiyo
- Meedumen Eha
- Meda Gedara
- Menik Nadiya Gala Basi
- Paba
- Palingu Menike
- Pehasara
- Rathu Ahasa
- Salsapuna
- Sanda Pini Bidaka
- Sikuru Wasanthe
- Thurya
- Wathsunu
- Yes Boss

== Awards ==
Wanigasekara has won several awards at local festivals.

=== State ===
Year	Nominee / work	Award	Result
1991	Kande Gedara	Popular woman on stage and teledrama	Won
1993		Most Popular Actress	Won

=== OCIC ===
Year	Nominee / work	Award	Result
1994	Kande Gedara	Most Popular Actress	Won

=== State Drama Festival ===
Year	Nominee / work	Award	Result
1995	Lihini	Best Supporting Actress	Won

=== Other ===
Year	Nominee / work	Award	Result
1990	Lankadeepa Vijaya Awards	Most Popular Actress	Won
1991	Lankadeepa Vijaya Awards	Most Popular Actress	Won
2009		Liya Varuna Award	Won
2010	Paba	ITN Award	Won
2010	Contribution to drama	Kalabhushana Award	Won

=== Presidential ===
Year	Nominee / work	Award	Result
1994/95	News Reading	Best News Anchor	Won

=== Sumathi ===
Year	Nominee / work	Award	Result
2003			Won

=== Raigam Tele'es ===
Year	Nominee / work	Award	Result
2013	Contribution to television	National Award	Won
