= All Ceylon Jamiyyathul Ulama =

- All Ceylon Jamiyyathul Ulama Emblem
- Formation: 1924; 102 years ago
- Type: Religious Organization
- Purpose: Religious Practice
- Headquarters: Maradana, Colombo, Sri Lanka
- Region served: Sri Lanka
- President: Mufti M.I.M. Rizwe
- Secretary General: Ash-Sheikh M. Arkam Nooramith
- Treasurer: Ash-Sheikh M.K. Abdur Rahman Bahji
- Website: www.acju.lk

All Ceylon Jamiyyathul Ulama (ACJU; Tamil: அகில இலங்கை ஜம்இய்யதுல் உலமா ) is the apex religious body of Islamic theologians that provides religious and community leadership to the Sri Lankan Muslim Community, who are 9.6% of the population of the country. It was established in 1924 and incorporated by Act No. 51 of 2000 of the Parliament of the Democratic Socialist Republic of Sri Lanka. ACJU has established 28 districts and 163 divisional branches, and enrolled over 10,000 theologians, most of whom are holders of doctorates, special degrees, master's degree or 1st degrees.

== Sub Divisions ==
The ACJU consists of: the Council for Cooperation and Coordination (CCC), Social Service Division, Education, Fatwa Division, Public relations, Hilal (Crescent) division, Research and publishing division, Youth affairs, Women's affairs, Ulama affairs, Division for branch organizing, Maktab, and Islamic economics and finance divisions.

As part of the Islamic economics and finance division, members also visit funeral houses to observe if assistance is needed to solve any legal issues arising from the death.

The Maktab project was launched In an environment where the madrasah education system and the remuneration of scholars was in disarray by the ACJU in 2011, with the objective of standardizing the process in all madrasahs enabling students to read the Al Qur'an with Tajweed, learn Islamic etiquettes & the foundations of Islam and gain familiarity of the Qur'anic Arabic Language within a short period of time. The curriculum and program structure was developed by Aalims who studied similar systems in India and South Africa, with them providing the knowledge transfer and initial training to get it underway. The project is now in place in Masjids around the island with classes currently conducted at three grade levels, which over the next two years will increase to 5.

== Executive members ==
1. Ash-Sheikh Mufti M.I.M. Rizwe
2. Ash-Sheikh M. Arkam Nooramith
3. Ash-Sheikh Dr. A. Azwar
4. Ash-Sheikh H. Omardeen
5. Ash-Sheikh M.J. Abdul Khalique
6. Ash-Sheikh A.L.M. Rila
7. Ash-Sheikh I.L.M. Hashim
8. Ash-SheikhA.L.M. Khaleel
9. Ash-Sheikh M.S.M. Thassim
10. Ash-Sheikh A.C.M. Fazil Humaidi
11. Ash-Sheikh M.K. Abdur Rahman
12. Ash-Sheikh M.L.M. Ilyas
13. Ash-Sheikh C.M. Abdul Muksith
14. Ash-Sheikh M.M. Hasan Fareed
15. Ash-Sheikh Dr. M. L. M. Mubarak Madani
16. Ash-Sheikh M.M.M. Murshid
17. Ash-Sheikh M.H.M. Burhan
18. Ash-Sheikh S.L. Nawfar
19. Ash-Sheikh A.C. Agar Mohamed
20. Ash-Sheikh S.A.M. Jawfer
21. Ash-Sheikh A.R Abdur Rahuman
22. Ash-Sheikh M.S.M. Farood
23. Ash-Sheikh Abdullah Mahmood Alim
24. Ash-Sheikh M. Fazil Farook
25. Ash-Sheikh S.H. Adam Bawa
26. Ash-Sheikh M. Rifa Hasan
27. Ash-Sheikh N.T.M. Lareef
28. Ash-Sheikh Zaky Ahmed
29. Ash-Sheikh A.L. Abdul Gaffar
30. Ash-Sheikh M.N.M. Saifulla
31. Ash-Sheikh N.A.M. Azhar
32. Ash-Sheikh N.P. Junaid
33. Ash-Sheikh S.M. Aliyar
34. Ash-Sheikh K.R.M. Insaf
35. Ash-Sheikh M.I.M.Shuhaib
36. Ash-Sheikh A. Yaseem
37. Ash-Sheikh H.M.M. Hidayathulla
38. Ash-Sheikh M.S.M. Nalim
39. Ash-Sheikh M.N.M. Ameer Husain
40. Ash-Sheikh M.S.M. Salsabeel
41. Ash-Sheikh N.M.Mohammed irfan
42. Ash-Sheikh S.M. Fayaz
43. Ash-Sheikh A. R. M. Faizal
44. Ash-Sheikh A.H Ihsanudeen
45. Ash-Sheikh M.Z.M. Mustafa Raza
46. Ash-Sheikh Dr M. Afwardeen
47. Ash-Sheikh A. M. Azath
48. Ash-Sheikh S.H.M. Ismail
49. Ash-Sheikh M. T. M. Salman
50. Ash-Sheikh Aadhil

== Controversies ==
=== Child Marriage and MMDA ===
In the past, the ACJU has justified and supported the Muslim Marriage and Divorce Act which allows child marriage for Muslims and even minors under 12 can be married off with a special permission from an Islamic magistrate. Further all divorce issues are handled by quazi courts which frequently discriminate and abuse female victims of domestic abuse and the woman can't even choose to be represented by a lawyer. Further females are banned from becoming quazis. In January 2021, the ACJU published the Report on Muslim Marriage and Divorce Act by Union of Religious Scholars in which it supports the amendment of most of the controversial parts of the MMDA. For instance it proposes to raise the age of marriage to 18 years old for Muslim male and female.

=== Female Genital Mutilation ===
The ACJU has demanded that the Sri Lankan government legalize Female Circumcision claiming that it is different from Female Genital Mutilation despite the World Health Organisation (WHO) classifying FGM as "procedures that intentionally alter or cause injury to the female genital organs for non-medical reasons" and have claimed it as an "obligatory Islamic duty" and according to Al Jazeera victims of FGM are threatened if they speak out. Further the ACJU claim that the process provides numerous health benefits to women despite the WHO stating that the procedure has no health benefits for girls and women. Instead the WHO state the process is painful and traumatic and interferes with the natural functioning of the body causing several immediate and long-term health consequences such as excessive bleeding, swelling of genital tissue and problems urinating, and severe infections that can lead to shock and in some cases, death, as well as complications in childbirth and increased risk of perinatal deaths. Supporters of FGM have claimed it to be a mere harmless "nick" to the clitoral hood and cannot be compared to other forms of FGM. However the process often carried out on infants may expose nerves making intercourse a painful and unpleasant experience. In 2017 Al Jazeera exposed the effects of FGM in Sri Lanka with the title "FGM in Sri Lanka: It's never 'just a nick'".

== See also ==
- List of Deobandi organisations
