= Albert Longhurst =

British archaeologist and art historian

Albert Henry Longhurst (1876 – 1955) was a British archaeologist and art historian, working in India and Ceylon.

Albert Henry Longhurst was born in Great Bookham, Surrey, England in 1876, the third of seven children (second son) to David Longhurst and Mary née Ranger.

Longhurst was the brother-in-law of Sir John Marshall, the Director-General of the Archaeology Survey of India (1902-1928).

In October 1913 he was appointed the Superintendent of the Southern Circle, Archaeological Survey of India.

From 1927 to 1931 he was in charge of the systematic digging of Nagarjunakonda.

Longhurst served as the Archaeological Commissioner, Archaeological Survey of Ceylon between 1934 and 1940, mainly working at Polonnaruwa but also at Anuradhapura and Sigiriya, concentrating more on conservation/restoration rather than excavation.

== Works ==
- Archaeological Survey of India; Longhurst, Albert Henry (1917). Hampi Ruins Described and Illustrated. Madras: Superintendent, Government Press.
- Longhurst, Albert Henry (1928). Pallava Architecture. Delhi: Cosmo Publications.
- Longhurst, Albert Henry (1936). The Story of the Stupa. Colombo: Ceylon Government Press.
- Excavations at Nagarjunakonda, 1929-1930.
- Longhurst, Albert Henry (1938). The Buddhist Antiquities of Nagarjunakonda, Madras Presidency. Delhi: Archaeological Survey of India.
- Memoirs Of The Archaeological Survey Of India No.33 Pt.2
- Longhurst, Albert Henry; Paranavitana, Senarath (1955). Archaeological Survey of Ceylon : Annual report 1935 - 1939 & 1940 - 1945. Ceylon: Archaeological Survey of Ceylon.
