= Kingswood College, Kandy =

Public school in Sri Lanka

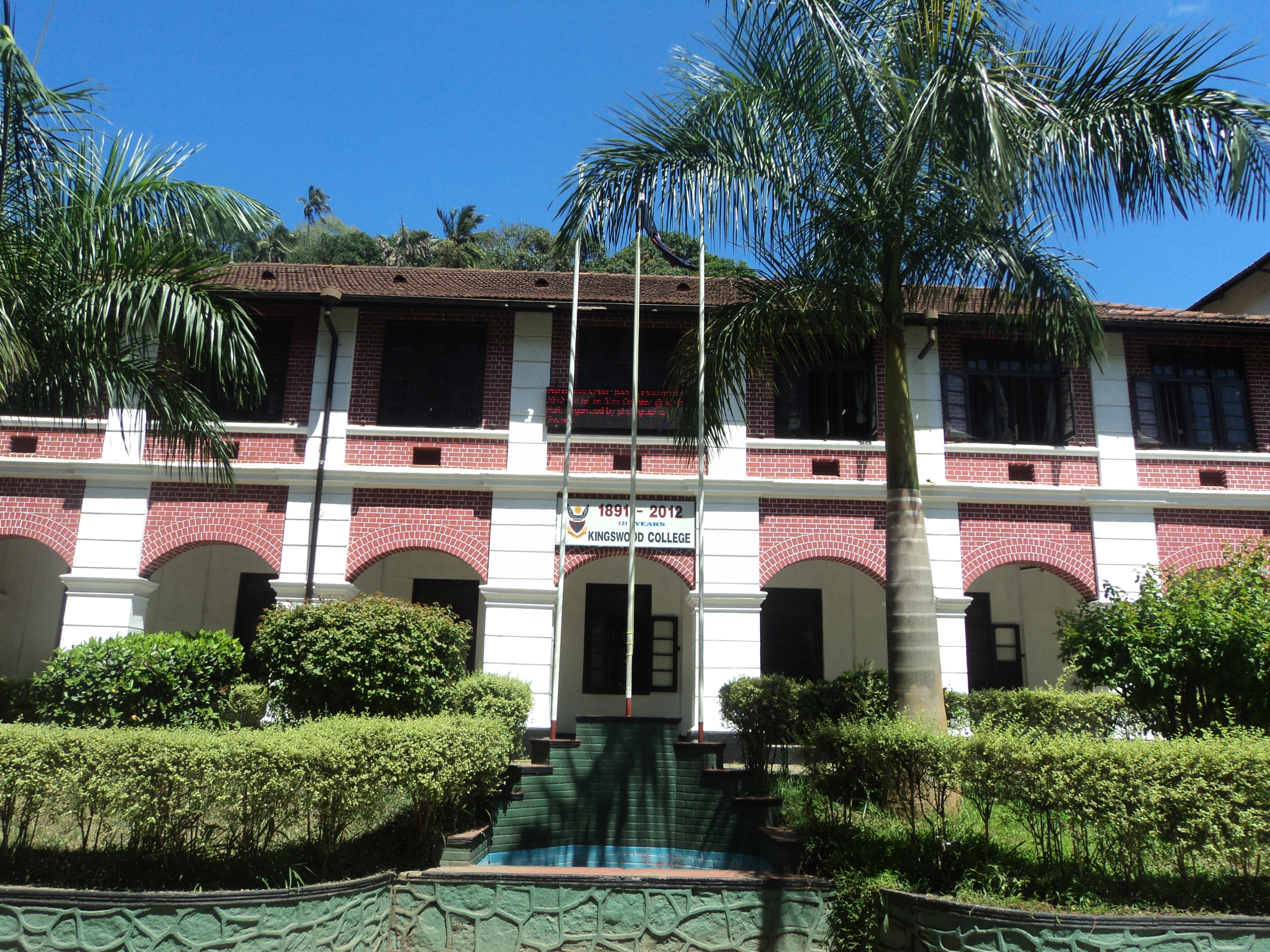
- Kingswood College

Location
- Kandy, Central Province; Sri Lanka; 7°16′40″N 80°36′56″E

Information
- Former name: Boys' High School, Kandy
- School type: National / Public with day and boarding facilities 1AB
- Motto: Latin: Fide et Virtute by fidelity and valour
- Religious affiliation: Methodist / Wesleyan
- Established: 4 May 1891 (135 years ago)
- Founder: Louis Edmund Blaze
- Educational authority: Sri Lanka Education Department
- School code: 03380
- Principal: H. M. D. A. Herath
- Staff: 300+
- Grades: 1 - 13
- Gender: Boys
- Age range: 5 to 20
- Enrollment: 3,500+
- Education system: National Education System
- Language: Sinhala, English
- Schedule: 07:30 - 13:30 (SLST)
- Houses: Eton; Harrow; Rugby; Winchester
- Student Union: Kingswood Student Union
- Colours: Maroon, royal blue
- Song: Hill-Throned
- Athletics: Yes
- Sports: Yes
- Mascot: Seraph
- Rival: Dharmaraja College
- National ranking: 4
- Publication: Our Boys (since 1893)
- Alumni: Old Kingswoodians
- Sister School: Girls' High School, Kandy
- Brother Schools: Richmond College; Wesley College
- Pupils: Gentlemen of Kingswood
- Abbreviation: KCK
- Website: Kingswood College
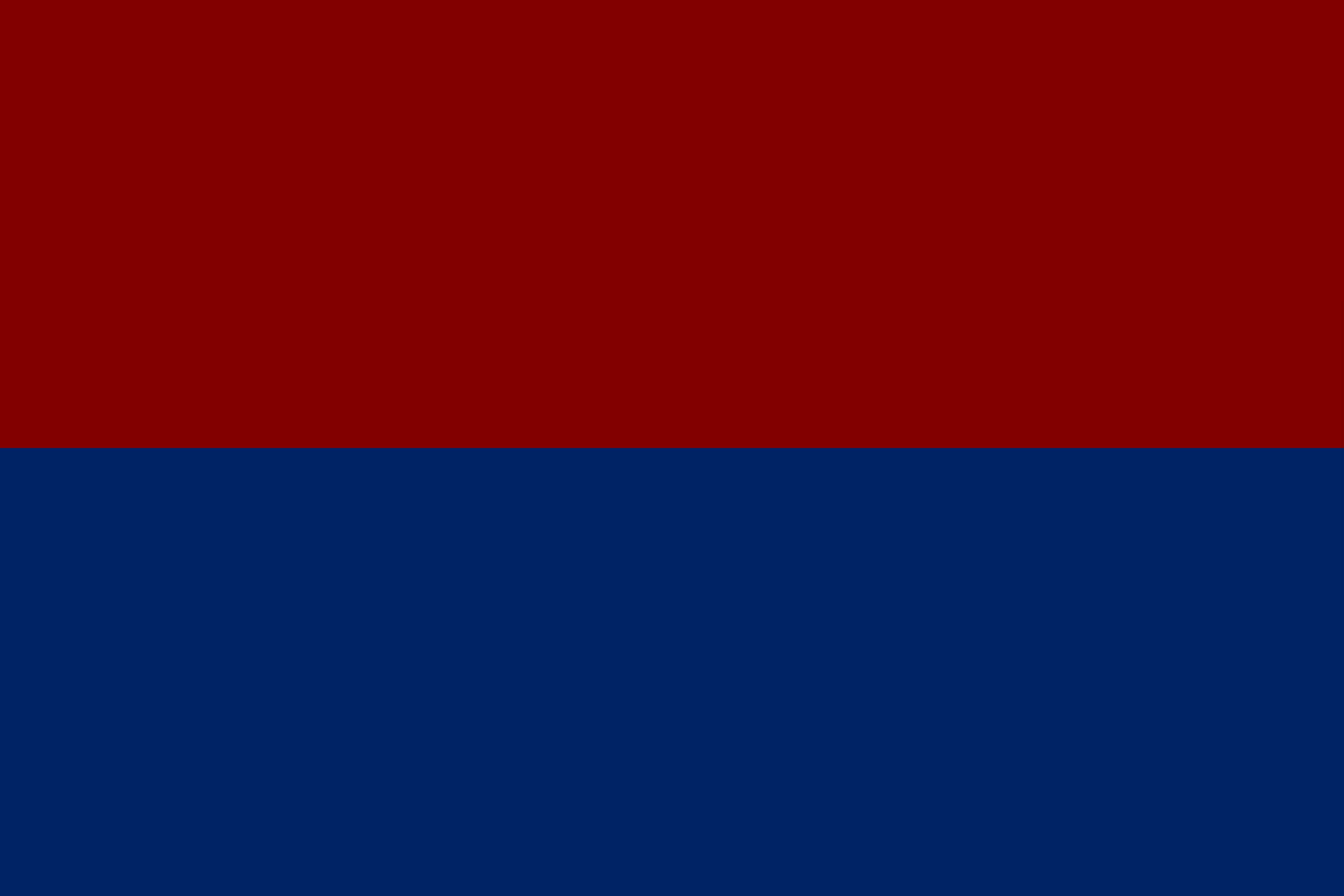
- Flag of Kingswood College
- Last updated: 02-06-2025

Kingswood College, Kandy (Sinhala: කිංග්ස්වුඩ් විද්‍යාලය) is a public day and boarding school for boys in Kandy, Sri Lanka. The school educates over 3,500 students from primary to secondary levels and is staffed by more than 300 faculty members. It was founded by Louis Edmund Blaze on 4 May 1891 with the aim of providing education grounded in Methodist principles.

Initially opened with just eleven students at Pavilion Street, the school later relocated to Randles Hill. It is one of the oldest schools in Kandy and is commonly known as KCK.

== History ==
Kingswood College was founded by Louis Edmund Blaze, with eleven students, as a boys' high school. At the time, most schools on the island had been classified as state‑aided government schools or missionary schools. Government grants were available until a school was established, with a solid core of teachers and an expanding role. Still, institutions run by individuals did not qualify for government assistance. The first few years of the school's existence were a struggle for Blaze. Fee income barely covered the cost of running the school, so Blaze handed the struggling institution over to be managed by the Methodist mission. In 1961, the state took over the school.

From the outset, Blaze modelled the school on the English public school system. A house system was introduced to the school in 1922, and the names selected were those of major English public schools (Eton, Harrow, Rugby and Winchester); he built up the school on the strength of his reputation. It was Blaze who coined the term, Gentlemen of Kingswood, to describe the body of students of his school and he who chose a motto for the school in Latin: Fide et Virtute. He then chose the school colours, maroon and dark blue, and wrote the words of the school song.

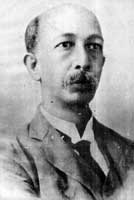
Louis Edmund Blaze, the founder and the first principal of Kingswood College

The school was the first in Sri Lanka to introduce rugby, the first boys' school to employ a female teacher, the first to introduce the sport of rowing and one of the first to establish a Cadet Corps. The first prize-giving was held in 1895, only four years after the school was founded and became an annual feature. One feature of the Kingswood Prize Giving was the Prologue written by Blaze, a review in verse of the year's events in the country and the world. It was generally recited by the boy who won the annual Oratory Prize. Blaze continued to write the annual Prologue for three decades after his retirement as the principal in 1923, almost up to the time of his death.

In 1900, Blaze wrote the first comprehensive school textbook on the history of Sri Lanka. It ran to several editions before it was superseded by the works of one of his earliest pupils at Kingswood, G. C. Mendis, who served for many years as a lecturer (and later reader) in the Department of History at the University of Ceylon.

Blaze held office at Kingswood for 32 years, retiring in 1923. He had seen the school through its formative years and had securely established it. Before his retirement, he planned the removal of the school from the small premises it occupied in Pavilion Street. As the number of students grew, the need for a more spacious and less noisy environment became a matter of increasing urgency. The location selected was in the village of Wel-Ata in Mulgampola, then a quiet and seemingly distant suburb of Kandy. The new site and the new buildings were made possible by a gift of money from a British industrialist, Sir John Scurrah Randles. The new complex of buildings consisted of classrooms, an administrative building, a large hostel and staff quarters. The school's new location (and railway halt just opposite) was named Randles Hill to honour Kingswood's main benefactor of modern times. The new buildings were opened in 1925 under Blaze's successor, Reverend E. Pearson, who ran the school for four years. He was succeeded by O. L. Gibbon (1929–1937) and F. A. J. Utting (1937–1942). They consolidated the work that Blaze had begun and, during their administration, the school continued to develop.

Although Kingswood was a Methodist missionary school, the student body contained Buddhists, Christians, Hindus, Muslims, Burghers, Eurasians and a mix of Ceylonese identity groups such as Malays, Chettis and Moors. A strong multiethnic admission was seen in the years leading to Independence. Methodist students did have some advantages when it came to the award of scholarships, but the special scholarships were awarded on merit and were open to all. The 1940s was a crucial period in the development of the school. Wartime conditions put an end to the practice of sending Englishmen as principals of the school. In 1942, P. H. Nonis became the first Sinhalese national to head the school, holding the post for 15 years. The school admitted some boys from S. Thomas' College, Mount Lavinia when the latter had to vacate its premises during World War II.

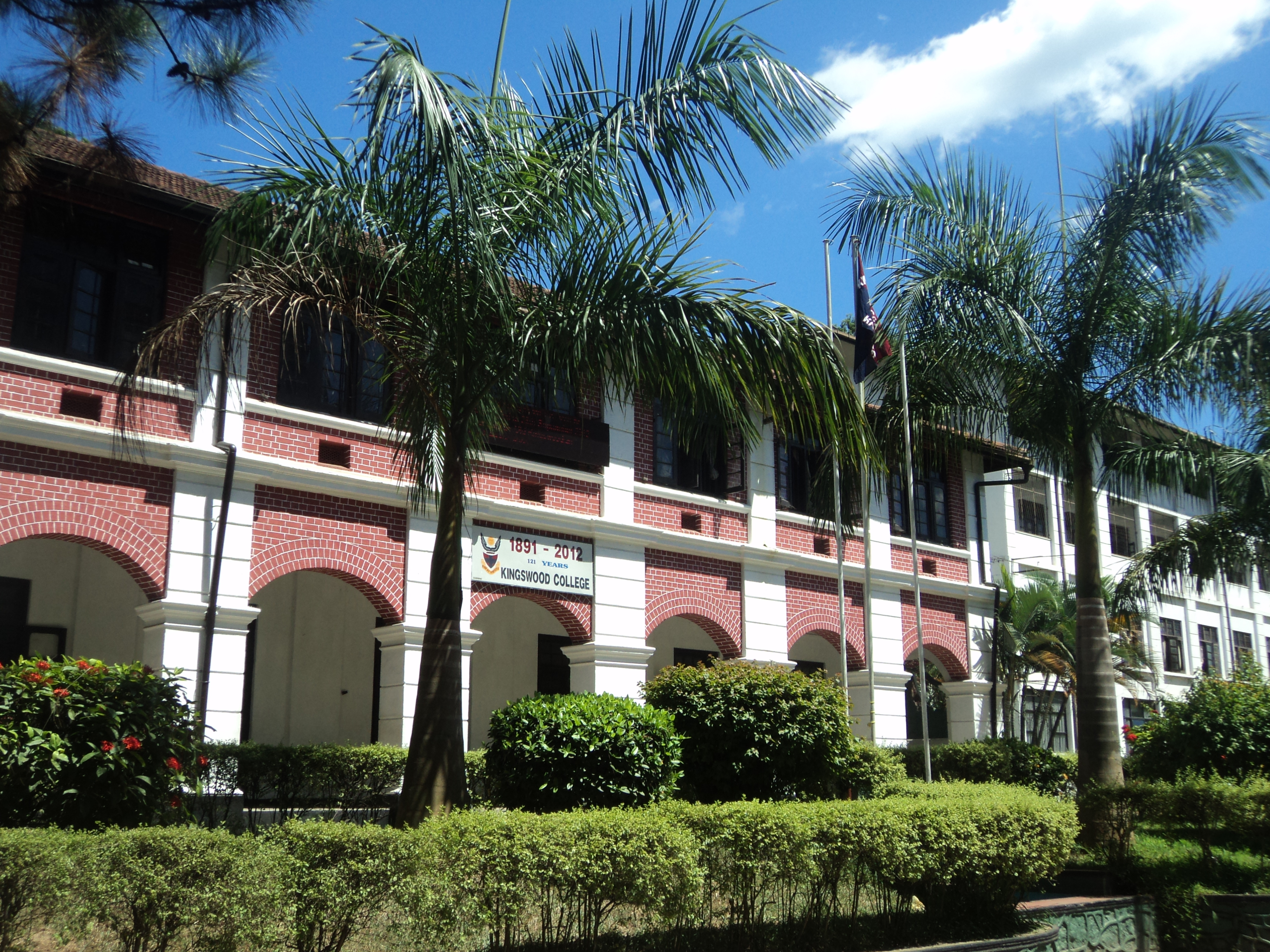
Interior view of Kingswood College

When the free education system was introduced in the late 1940s, the Methodist mission had to decide whether the school should opt out of it and retain its independence as a fee‑levying school, or join the national education in which the state would pay the teaching staff and relieve its students of the need to pay fees. Some elite schools on the island opted out, but few missionary schools could afford to forgo the advantage of having the salaries of the staff covered; Kingswood was one of them.

Nonis presided over the transition from an independent school to a school in the national school system. The control of the education department bureaucracy, though, was neither vigorous nor rigid. Thus, the change in status was a subtle one, and the school was able to maintain both its independence and its traditions almost undisturbed. Even now, Kingswood is a small institution (with about 700 students and about 35 teachers) compared to other schools in the hill country.

During this period, the school built up a reputation in sports. The school's reputation for hockey was enhanced during Nonis' period. He was a well-known school cricketer and he built up a good cricket team. If one single individual personified the schools' achievements in sports during this era it would be Frederick A. White, younger brother of Olympian Duncan White.

After Nonis' retirement, B. A. Thambipillai became acting principal and held office till the arrival of Kenneth M. de Lanerolle (1958–1967). His was a much more difficult task than that of his predecessors, for during 1960—1961 the school became fully state‑controlled. When the state took over the school, the number of students increased, as in other state schools in the country. Although the state financed the salaries and wages of the teachers and the support staff, it became more difficult to maintain sports and other extracurricular activities and to manage facilities to the same degree. Nor was it as easy as in the past to finance the construction of new buildings. Nevertheless, new buildings were erected thanks to the initiatives of de Lanerolle and his constant search for funds from parents, old boys and well-wishers. E S Liyanage, who was principal from 1977 to 1984, was the first old boy to become principal of the school. The principalship of Nihal Herath and R. B. Rambukwella was also important. Herath introduced changes to the college which brought progress in discipline, the standard of education and sports. He also made preparations for the centenary year that was to come in 1991, before he left to become principal of Dharmaraja College, Kandy.

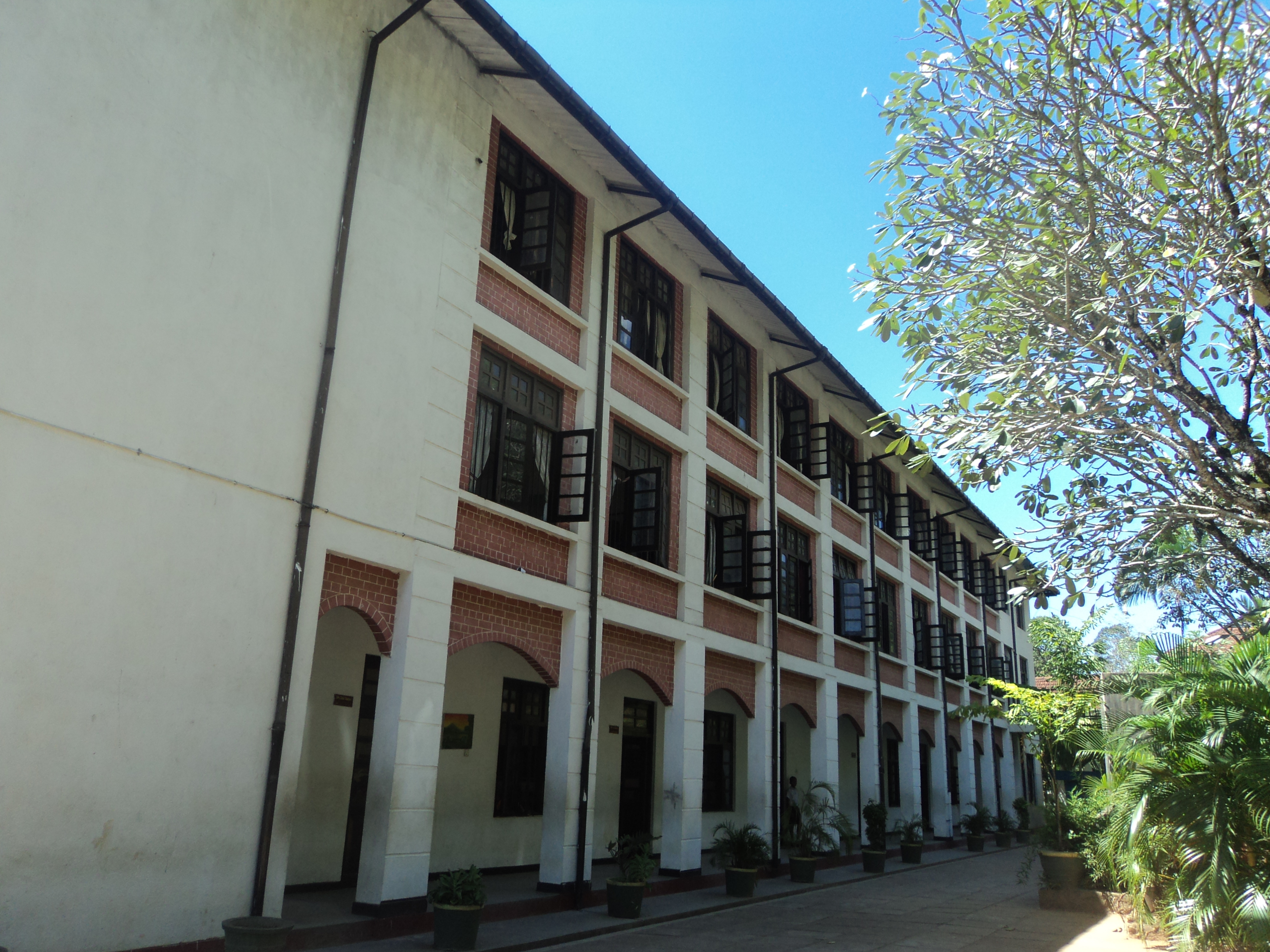
Kingswood College Century Building

The post-1961 principals had a more difficult task in the management of the school. They were part of a complex administrative system and were in transferable service; their control of admissions was limited; they had little influence on the choice of teachers for the school. Thus, they faced challenges in maintaining the school as a distinctive entity within the state system and keeping alive the school traditions of the past. The solid and elegant old buildings are a legacy of the past and even the playing field has been expanded only to a limited degree. Thus, the physical shape of the school is much the same as in the days of the Methodist mission. Those who led the school during this century would need to preserve as much of the original shape as possible, but would also need to add to the buildings to cope with the increase in the number of students.

Ranjith Chandrasekara served as Principal of Kingswood College from 2000 to 2013, leading the school for nearly thirteen years. After his tenure at Kingswood, he was promoted to National Schools Director for Sri Lanka, where he contributes to the Ministry of Education and serves as chairman of the Sri Lanka Schools Rugby Foundation. During his time at Kingswood, Chandrasekara oversaw the construction of several key facilities, including a modern swimming pool complex, a new auditorium and main hall, a gymnasium, and a new playground, significantly enhancing the school's infrastructure and resources.

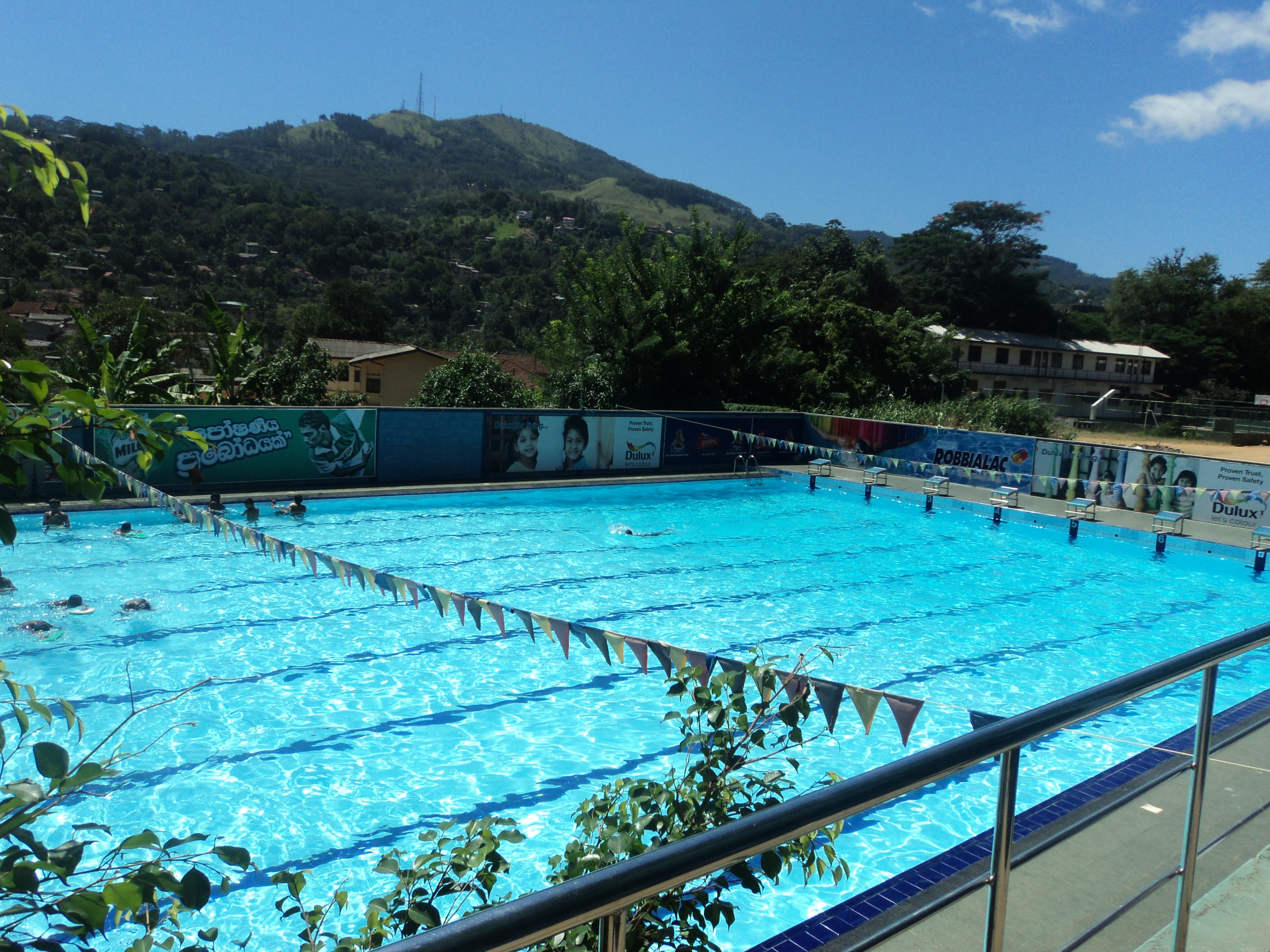
Kingswood College Swimming Pool

== House system ==
There are four houses in Kingswood College. The house system was introduced to the school in June 1922, and the names selected were those of major English public schools in England.

- – Eton House
- – Harrow House
- – Rugby House
- – Winchester House

== College crest ==
Coat of arms of Kingswood College, Kandy
Description The college crest was designed by Alfred Bartlam of the technical school with the help of R. G. Anthonisz. A. E. A. Poulier had the badge drawn in England and arranged to engrave the stamp. Adopted 1922 Years in use 104 Motto Latin: Fide et Virtute; English: Fidelity and valour Symbolism The Shield, The Cross, The Sun, The Wings: Shield and the cross:- Fides in their literal and derived; Sun and the wings:- Representing virtus

== College anthem ==
A short part of Kingswood College's anthem "Hill-Throned".

The college song is "Hill-Throned", sung at the start of the school day and on important occasions. The words of the song were written by Louis Edmund Blaze, the founder of Kingswood College with the lyrics from the song of Kingswood School in England adapted to local conditions.

== College colours and flag ==
The college colours of Kingswood College are maroon and royal blue, symbolising "loyalty" and "manliness". The Kingswood flag features maroon and blue oblongs with the college crest cantered. The flag, a concept of Sir Louis Edmund Blaze, was first hoisted in 1898.

== KFE ==
The term "KFE" stands for "Kingswood for Ever" and has been a familiar salutation among Kingswoodians since early times. It is commonly used in both verbal exchanges and written communications. This expression is often seen among alumni during reunions or farewells and is frequently used to conclude speeches or vote of thanks at the college. During prize giving and other ceremonies, guests, alumni, and Kingswoodians often end their speeches with a hearty KFE.

== School traditions ==
=== Kingswood Week ===
The most important function of the school will take place in this special week. Kingswood Week was first started in 1906 by the founder of Kingswood Louis Edmund Blaze. Since then Kingswood gentlemen and the school staff have carried on the Kingswood week as a tradition for over 120 years.

==== Kingswood Week 1993 ====
1. Kingswood Sunday
2. Guest of the week
3. Sportsmeet
4. Prize Giving
5. Fellowship Dinner and Old Boys' Day

The colours night, which originated in 1986, was brought into the week much later. In the late 1990s, the sports meet was taken out of the Week. During the last years of Ranjith Chandrasekara's days, Kala Ulela and Scouts Day were brought in. Both those inclusions have tilted the balance of the Kingswood week. At the very beginning, the week used to start with the guest of the week, who would address the main assembly. The week would conclude with the Kingswood Sunday. The Kingswood Sunday religious activities (according to Blaze) were an initiative by the students of the school. The administration had not known of the boys visiting places of worship. Later, it had been formally annexed to the agenda.

==== Kingswood Week 2025 ====
1. Kingswood Sunday
2. Guest of the week
3. Kala Ulela
4. Prize Giving
5. Colours Awards Ceremony

Kingswood Week 2025 commenced from Sunday, 5 October 2025 to Friday, 10 October 2025.

== Sports and extracurricular activities ==
Sports is one of the major parts of Kingswood College with over eighteen different sports played. Taking centre stage of the annual sporting calendar is the Battle of the Maroons, the L. E. Blaze Trophy, William Weerasinghe Trophy, Lennie De Silva Memorial Trophy and the Kenneth De Lennerolle Shield.

=== Kingswood Cricket ===
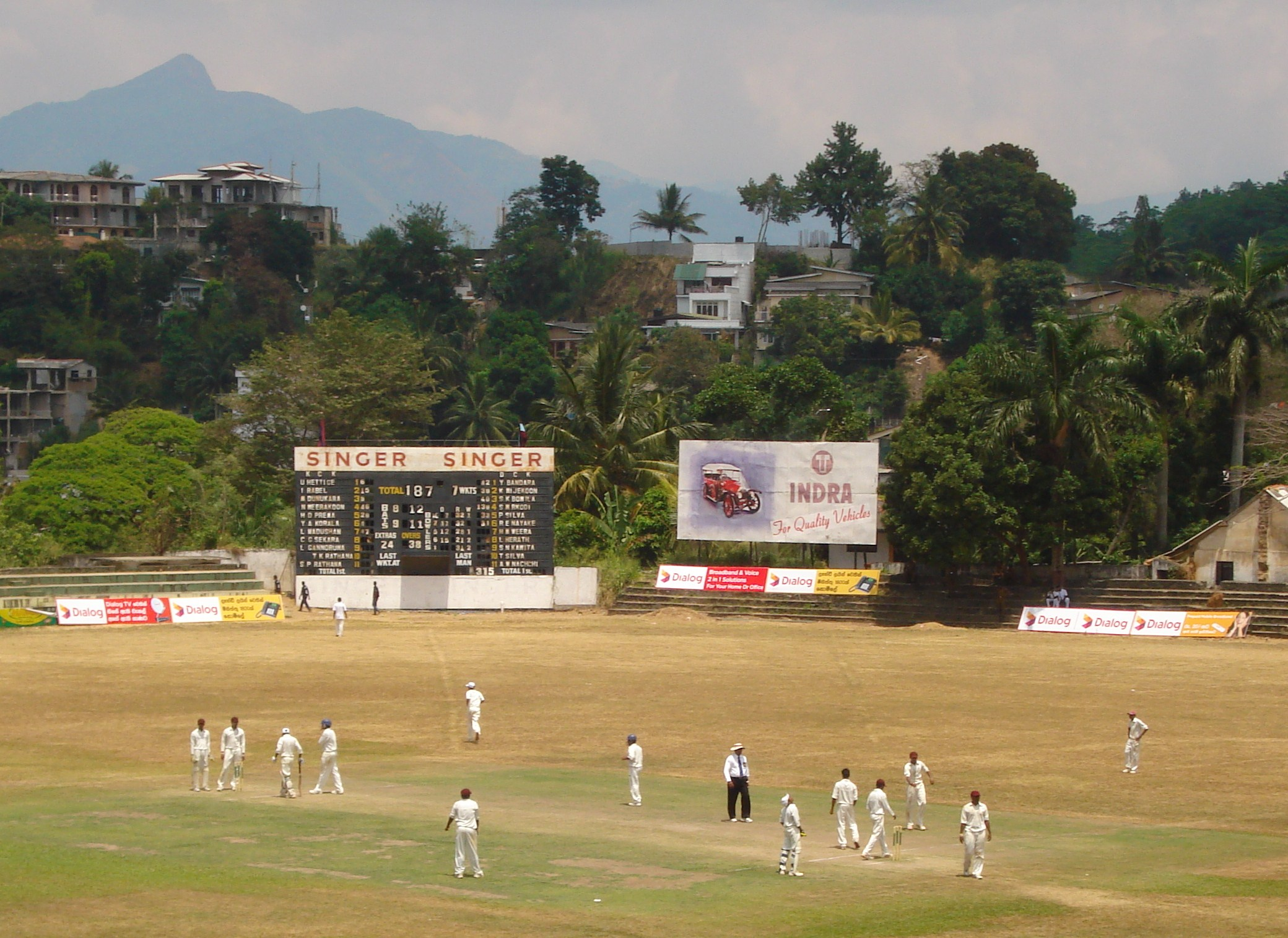
104th Battle of Maroons

The Kingswood College cricketing tradition extends across a century. R. Blake took eight for seven in 1916 against Dharmaraja College. The cricket team received its first win against the same opponent again, by nine runs in 1918. In the Big Match against Dharmaraja College in 1951, Mahinda Silva from Kingswood secured a century. C. M. Fernando was declared the best player in 1958, and H. N. A. Gamage was selected as the best bowler.

In 2019, Kaveeja Gamage a player for under-13, reached island second place by scoring a century against St. Sylvester’s College. Later that same year, Hansathika Rajanayake took 10 wickets in his match against Dharmaraja College. Current under-15 captain is Menuka Dissanayake, an all-rounder skilled in every aspect of cricket. After the under-15 matches in 2019, Thenuka Vishan scored a century and Chanuka scored a half-century making significant contributions to the team winning two matches. Menuka Pushpattiya, a player for the under-19 team also excelled in various forms of achievement in 2019 too.

==== Battle of the Maroons ====
Kingswood College maintains close ties with their home-town rival school, Dharmaraja College, with whom they play the annual cricket encounter Battle of the Maroons, which is one of the oldest annual cricket matches in Sri Lanka and the oldest in Kandy region.

=== Kingswood Rugby ===
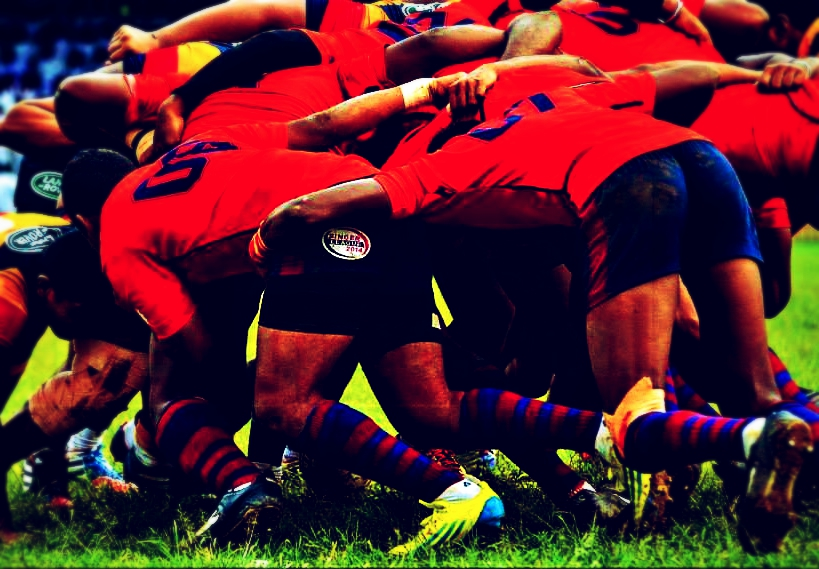
Kingswood Rugby Team

Foundations and early history (1891–1908)

Kingswood College holds the historic distinction of being the pioneer of school rugby football in Sri Lanka. The sport was introduced to the institution in 1891 by its founder and principal, Louis Edmund Blazé, an alumnus of Trinity College, Kandy. The island's inaugural rugby fixtures took place on 27 November and 8 December 1891, contested between teams composed of Kingswood students and staff members. Between 1891 and 1906, the school regularly played matches against British military regiments stationed in Kandy. On 11 August 1906, Kingswood contested the first official inter-school rugby match in Ceylon against Trinity College at the Bogambara Grounds, concluding in a 6–6 draw. Following a tragic on-field fatality resulting from a kick injury, the school administration officially suspended the sport in 1908.

Revival and ascent to the 'A' division (1968–1988)

The sport was officially revived at Kingswood in 1968 under the direction of the Games Master and Physical Education director, Winston Hoole, who introduced an Under-17 developmental squad. The early revival years were captained by Deepal Jayasinghe and M.A.S. Ismail (1968), followed by Kamal Maimon and W.W. Jayasekara (1969).

By 1980, under the tactical guidance of coach Z.M. Zarook, Kingswood secured the Schools 'B' Division Championship and won the Tyrell Muttiah Trophy, earning an immediate promotion to the elite 'A' Division. In 1981, the team secured a fourth-place finish in the prestigious Gratien Cup competition. The late 1980s marked the school's return as a major national powerhouse:

- 1986 Season: Secured 9 victories and 1 draw out of 14 fixtures.
- 1987 Season: Achieved a record of 9 wins out of 10 matches and finished as runners-up to Trinity College (11–6) in the R. Premadasa Knock-out Tournament after leading 5–3 at halftime.
- 1988 Season: Concluded an historic undefeated season across seven fixtures and clinched the All-Island Schools Rugby Sevens Championship.

Championship era and modern stature (2000–Present)

At the turn of the century, Kingswood established a period of domestic dominance in the school rugby landscape, characterised by multiple national titles and high-tier athletic output:

- 2000: Won the prestigious President's Trophy for the first time in school history, defeating S. Thomas' College, Mount Lavinia by 30–26 under the captaincy of Chamara Vithanage.
- 2003: Secured the President's Trophy Knock-out Championship.
- 2004: Achieved historic "Triple Champion" status. Under the captaincy of Fazil Marija, the team remained completely unbeaten, winning the All-Island Schools Rugby Sevens, the Schools League Championship, and the President's Trophy Knock-out Tournament.
- 2005: Retained the Schools League Championship and won the President's Trophy Knock-out Championship for the third consecutive year. Additionally, seven Kingswood players were selected simultaneously to represent the Sri Lanka Youth National Rugby Team.
- 2006: Finished as runners-up in both the Schools League Championship and the President's Trophy Knock-out Tournament.
- 2008: Emerged as the undisputed Singer 'A' Division League Champions.
- 2009: Won the All-Island Schools Rugby Sevens Championship.
- 2010: Finished as runners-up in the Schools League Championship.
- 2016: Crowned the All-Island Under-18 Champions.
- 2019: Won the Schools Rugby League Plate Championship.

==== L. E. Blaze Trophy ====
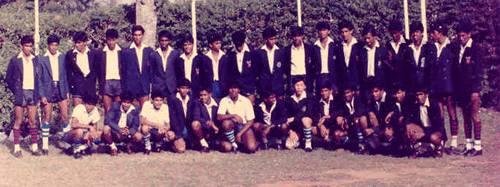
Inaugural Blaze Trophy Teams posing in 1986

The annual rugby match for the L.E. Blaze Trophy between Kingswood College and Wesley College has a large amount of history and a tradition of sportsmanship and rivalry for many decades. The trophy is named after the founder of Kingswood College and a leader of school sports in Sri Lanka, Louis Edmund Blaze, and represents the competition and friendship between the two schools.

The match attracts many alumni, students, and supporters every year who wish to be part of al contest of determination and teamwork.

==== William Weerasinghe Memorial Trophy ====
Kingswood College competes with Dharmaraja College at their annual rugby encounter for the William Weerasinghe Memorial Trophy since 2001.

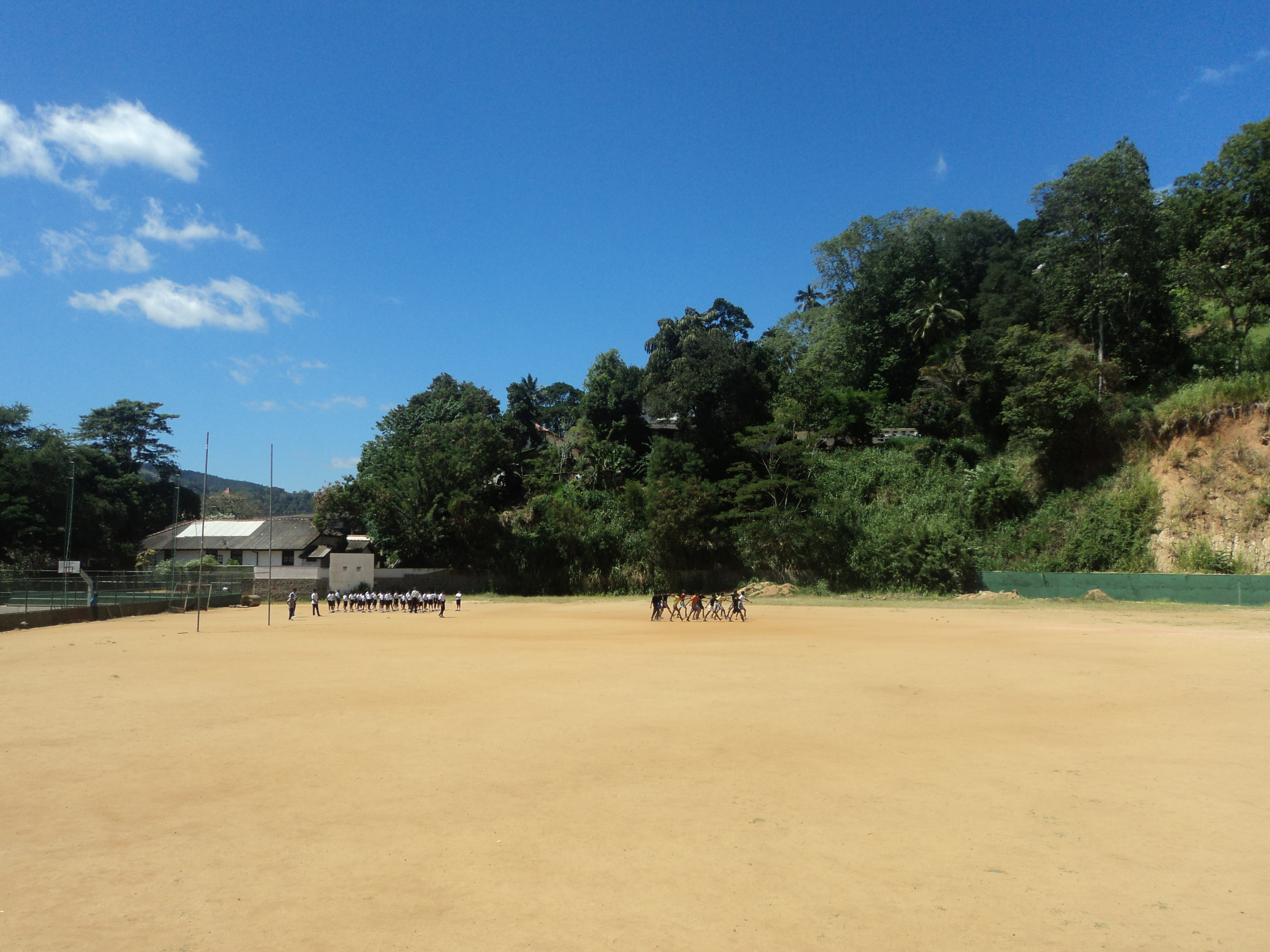
Kingswood College Play Ground in 2012

=== Kingswood Football ===
Football history at Kingswood College has been long-established; it is ranked among the top five sports played at Kingswood. In the last five years, the under-20 age football team has been a dominant team in the Central Provincial Inter School Competition, winning all of the championships. The Kingswood College team is one of the two teams that represents the Group 1 team of the Kandy district.

One of the highlights was in 2018 when Pathum Vimukthi Madumal, the team captain of the under-23 youth football team represented the Sri Lankan national team. Kingswood gentleman I. Inshaam was part of the under-16 Sri Lanka school team.

==== Kenneth M. De Lanerolle Memorial Shield ====
The annual soccer match for the Kenneth De Lennerolle Shield is played against Wesley College, which is the methodist counterpart of Kingswood College.

=== Kingswood Hockey ===
Hockey started at Kingswood in 1938 by a previous vice principal, V. D. Paul Raj, and is now an important part of the sporting achievements of the school. The Kingswood hockey team stands out as one of the most formidable and remarkable teams across the island. The school has produced many talented players, including Freddie White, a former national team captain and acclaimed as the best Asian goalkeeper of the 1950s. Hockey has long been the most popular sport among hostelers.

==== Lennie De Silva Memorial Trophy ====
A significant tradition in our hockey culture is the annual "Lennie De Silva Memorial Trophy", contested by Kingswood and Royal College. In 1998, the college hockey team marked its first international participation, reflecting the sport's importance at Kingswood. The last president of the Sri Lanka Schools Hockey Federation, Roy De Silva, is a distinguished old boy of our hockey team and highlights the standard of coaching and experience that Kingswoodians get.

=== Kingswood Cadet corps ===
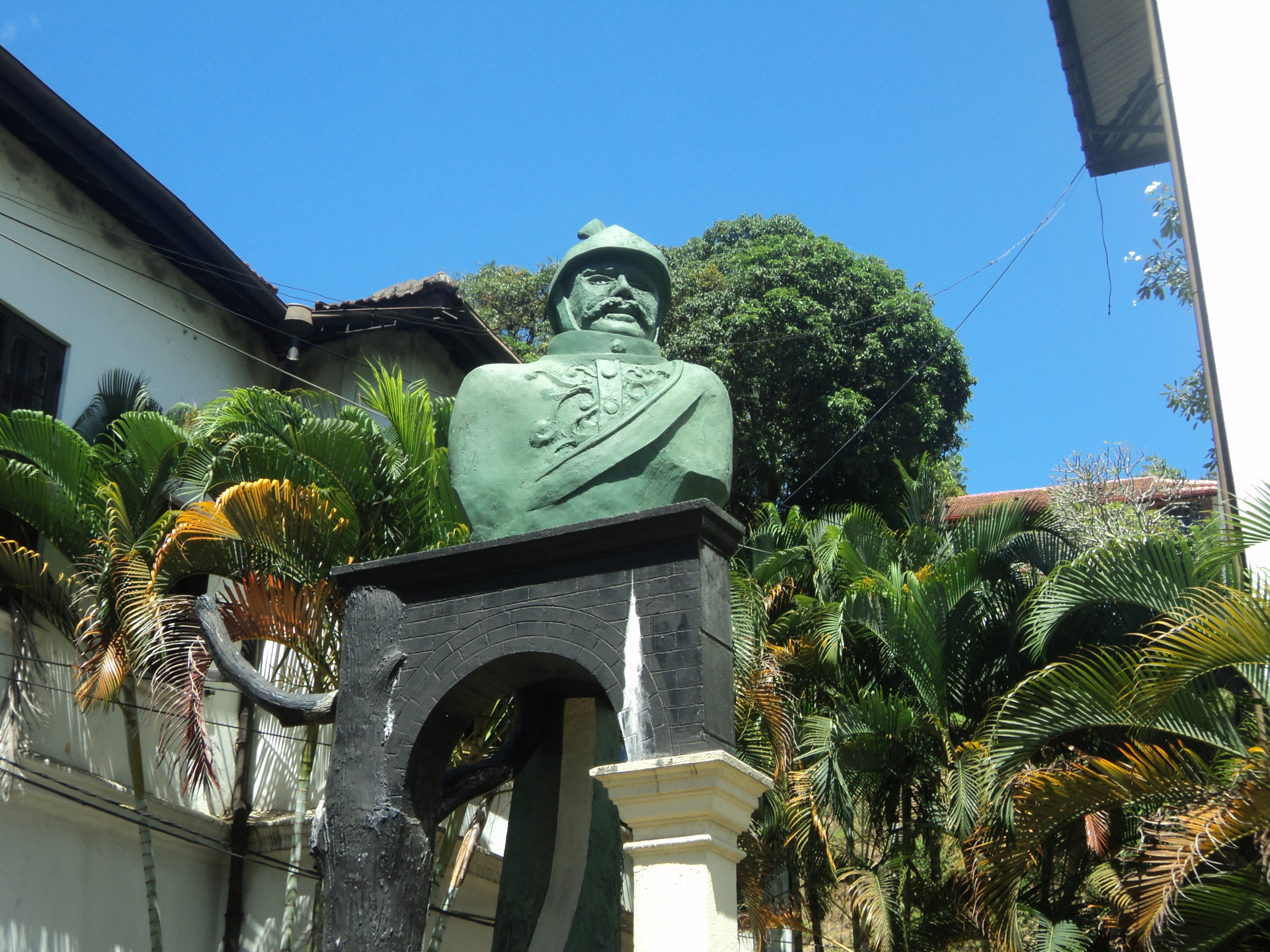
The War Heroes Monument in Kingswood College

Kingswood College is proud to be one of the first five schools in Sri Lanka to establish a cadet movement, a tradition that dates back to the 1880s. Captain Ernest Handscomb Spencer’s dedication led to the formation of a cadet company at Kingswood. Officially recognized in 1902 under the Ceylon Light Infantry (CLI), cadet training had already been informally provided to Kingswoodians due to the discipline and initiative of the "Gentlemen of Kingswood".

Notable achievements include winning the Herman Loos Challenge Trophy upon its introduction in 1917 and consecutively in 1919, 1920, and 1921. The cadets also presented a Guard of Honour to Sir John Randles in 1925 and President Ranasinghe Premadasa in 1991. Celebrating its centenary in 2002, the cadet platoon won the 2nd Battalion Trophy.

Under Major Sanath Weerasekara, the platoon won the Herman Loos Trophy in 2003, 2005, 2006, and 2011, and the 2nd Battalion Trophy consecutively from 2000. Lieutenant Colonels J.S.M. Wellangiriya and H.M.H. Pilapitiya also contributed significantly. Sgt. Kanchana Dissanayake was promoted to Regiment Sergeant Major of the 2nd Battalion in 2011.

Kingswood cadets achieved 3rd place in the 2015 Herman Loos Trophy and 2nd place in 2016 under 2nd Lieutenant Mallawa Bandara and Captain Suresh Vidanagamage. Captain Vidanagamage was named "Best Commander" in 2016, 2018, and 2019. In 2019, Kingswood cadets set two national records and won the 2nd Battalion Trophy, achieving the highest points in NCC history and in the firing event.

The War Hero Statue and the War Heroes’ Museum at Kingswood honour those who sacrificed their lives in the civil war. Over the past 119 years, the cadet platoon has made immense contributions, shaping exemplary citizens.

=== Eastern cadet band ===
The Eastern Cadet Band of Kingswood College plays a crucial role in developing student personalities and strengthening the bond among Kingswood Gentlemen. By participating in various camps and community service activities, including the Annual Regional Independence Day celebrations and the Central Provincial Sports Festival, the band contributes significantly to the community. The band's mission is to cultivate independent Sri Lankan citizens with strong leadership qualities.

=== Western cadet band ===
In 1972, Kingswood College began its school band under the guidance of K. M. Gooneratne Banda, initially starting as an eastern band. Over time, instruments such as the Daula and Thammettama were replaced by side drums and bass drums, and wooden flutes were added, transitioning the band to a Western-style band. S. Hettiarachchi was the teacher in charge during this period.

In 1978, with the support of Hettiarachchi, the band acquired essential Western musical instruments and was officially recognised as a Western Cadet Band by the National Cadet Corps. E. S. Liyanage’s efforts further enhanced the band with the addition of trumpets, earning the distinction of being the first Western Cadet Band in Kandy. The Western Cadet Band has achieved notable success, including representing the school at an international training session in India, and participating in Independence Day celebrations and Central Province Sports Competitions annually.

=== National contributions and alumni identity ===
The development pathways at Randles Hill have consistently produced prominent administrators, tactical coaches, match officials, and club/national-level players.

- National Administrative Leadership: Alumnus and former principal Ranjith Chandrasekara served multiple tenures as the President of the Sri Lanka Schools Rugby Football Association (SLSRFA).
- Tactical and Coaching Personnel: Prominent national and international coaches produced by the college include Ananda Kasthuriarachchi, Ronnie Ibrahim, Mothilal Jayathilake, Mothilal Jayathilake, Nilfer Ibrahim, Nalaka Weerakkoddy, Fazil Marija, and international strength coach Ransilu Jayathilake.
- Match Officials: Notable local and international rugby referees include A.C. Tennakoon, Irshad Cader, Asela Muthumala, Mahesh Senanayake, Harshana Wijeweera, and Ranil De Silva. Mahesh Senanayake, Harshana Wijeweera, and Ranil De Silva.
- Distinguished Club and National Alumni: Early pioneers Owen Mottau (Dimbula ACC and Sri Lanka) and Iqbal Jumar (CR & FC) achieved national prominence without playing school-level rugby due to the temporary hiatus. Following the sport's revival, the school produced over 50 players who went on to represent major domestic clubs and the senior Sri Lanka National Team. Notable senior national representatives include Rohan de Silva, Lalith Wijeratne, Tissa Wijeratne, Jerome Gray, Mahinda Serasinghe, Parakrama Samaraweera, Kenneth de Silva, Dunstan de Silva, T.M.N. Sherifdeen, Roy Kamil Amith, Palitha Wijesuriya, Jeewa Galgamuwa, Senaka Bandara, Amjad and Ansar Buksh, Chamara Vithanage, and Amjad Buks. the Ibrahim brothers (Raja, Ronnie, Rizvi, Nilufer), Dev Anand, M. Fazal, Thilina Weerasinghe, R. Raheem, R. Samaratunga, S. Weerasinghe, N. Ranasinghe, T. de Silva, L. Premawansa, L.M. Wahab, Chamara de Silva, Sameera Wijesinghe, I.B. Galagoda, Eranda Weerakkoddy, Navin Wijaratne, Roshan Weeraratne, Gayan Weeraratne, Riza Raffaideen, and former Sri Lanka national captain and fly-half, Fazil Marija. Additionally, downstream development pathways continue to yield junior national honors; in 2018, R. Lakshan Chandrarathne, and in 2019, W. A. Senevirathne, Milan Weerasinghe, and K. D. S. Ekanayake represented Sri Lanka at the Under-19 Asian Rugby Tournament in China, where they were awarded national school colors.

== Co-Curricular activities ==
=== Kingswood Scouts ===
2nd Kandy Scout Troop
- Kingswood Scouts Logo
- Owner: Kingswood College, Kandy
- Age range: 11-19
- Headquarters: Kingswood College, Kandy
- Country: Sri Lanka
- Founded: 4 March 1914 (112 years ago)
- Membership: 700+
- Website; Randles Scouts

The Kingswood Scout Troop, also known as the 2nd Kandy Scout Troop, was founded on 4 March 1914. The Kingswood Scout Troop is known all around the country as well as in South Asia for its, remarkable achievement of hosting the oldest memorial Hike in Sri Lanka, South Asia and most probably in Asia the J. J. P. Dehigama Memorial Orienteering Competition. The 2nd Kandy Scout Troop of Kingswood College, was held the first ever Hiking Festival in Sri Lanka on 23 October 2014, to celebrate its 100 years of Scouting.

=== Clubs and societies ===
Kingswood College currently has over 100+ student societies. Kingswood College Astronomical Society (since 1996), Kingswood Media Network (since 2011), Kingswood Interact (since 1988) and Kingswood Photographic Club (since 1935) are one of the oldest and the largest societies in Kingswood College on present days.

- Kingswood College Photographic Club (since 1935)
- Kingswood Media Network (since 2011)
- Kingswood Interact Club (since 1988)
- Kingswood Student Christian Movement
- Kingswood Islamic Majlis (since 1962)
- Kingswood Buddhist Society (since 1962)
- Kingswood Science Society (since 1936)
- Kingswood Commerce Society
- Kingswood Arts Society
- Kingswood Tech Unit
- Kingswood IT Society (since 2000)
- Kingswood English Literary Association
- Kingswood Gavel Club
- Kingswood English Debating Society
- Kingswood Sinhala Debating Circle
- Kingswood College Quiz Club
- Kingswood Astronomical Society (since 1996)
- Kingswood Research Unit (since 2020)
- Kingswood Aviation Club
- Kingswood Entrepreneurs’ Club
- Kingswood Capital Market Club
- Kingswood Electronics Club
- Kingswood UNESCO Club
- Kingswood YGSO
- Kingswood Western Music Society
- Kingswood Eastern Music Association
- Kingswood Drama Society
- Kingswood Dancing Guild
- Kingswood Students’ Parliament & etc.

=== Kingswood music ===
The college has a strong association with the study of music, both western and oriental music.

The annual musical festival, Sihina Dorakada, organised by the oriental Music Association with the assistance of alumni and SDB has become an important event on Kandy's and school's cultural calendar.

== School principals ==
Principals come in all shapes and sizes, and this is no exception for Kingswood, too. From the earliest days of the founding father, Louis Blaze to the current head of the college, Dhammika Herath, Kingswood has so far had nineteen principals in its 135 year history.

No.	Name	Office Time			Special Notes
No.	Name	From	To	For	Special Notes
1	Louis Edmund Blaze	1891	1923	31 years	The founder and the first principal of Kingswood College.
2	Rev. E. Pearson	1923	1927	4 years	
3	O. L. Gibbon	1928	1937	9 years	
4	F. A. J. Utting	1937	1942	5 years	Missionaries Partner
5	P. Harold Nonis	1942	1957	15 years	The first Sri Lankan principal of the college and developed the academics of the school in all streams.
-	B. A. Thambipillai (Acting)	1957	1958	1 years	
6	K. M. De Lanarolle	1958	1967	9 years	K. M. De Lanerolle debates are named after him.
7	L. W. N. Labutalle	1967	1974	7 years	
8	B. N. Premachandra	1974	1976	2 years	
9	E. S. Liyanage	1977	1984	7 years	
10	Nihal Herath	1985	1989	4 years	Introduced progress in discipline, standard of education and sports system.
11	R. B. Rambukwella	1989	1997	8 years	
12	B. A. Abeyratne	1997	1998	1 year	
13	Nelson Rathnayake	1998	2000	2 years	
14	Ranjith Chandrasekara	2000	2013	13 years	Developed the school's academic and extracurricular side of the school.
-	Ananda Weerasurya (Acting)	2013	2014	1 years	
15	P. G. S. Bandara	2014	2015	1 years	Interdicted while in office.
16	R. D. M. P. Weerathunga	2016	2018	2 years	
-	B. M. H. A. Bandara (Acting)	2018	2019	2 years	
-	Vacant	2019	2020	2 years	
17	K. W. D. Upali Chandrakumara	2020	2023	3 years	Developed the school's academic side.
18	D. N. Namal Chandanakumara	2023	2024	1 year	Developed the school's sports and extracurricular side.
19	H. M. Dhammika A. Herath	2024	Present	2 years, 3 months	Incumbent principal

== School magazine ==
Our Boys is the name the Kingswood Magazine and stated by a concept of founder of Kingswood and it was first put into print in the 1890s. Our boys started because, as Blaze records in KFE: The Story of Kingswood, Kandy, the magazine was initially an affair of a few pages held together: more like a pamphlet, which carried the creative work and other notices the school had to offer.

The Our Boys is still published yearly.

== Notable alumni ==
Former students of Kingswood College, are known as Old Kingswoodians, include many prominent leaders across politics, the military, arts, academia, and public service in Sri Lanka. Among them are Kamal Chunchie, a minister noted for his work in both Sri Lanka and Britain, and Allan Morley Spaar, who served as Mayor of Kandy during the early 1940s. Old Kingswoodians also include J. P. Jayasena, a Senator of Ceylon, Anuradha Dullewe Wijeyeratne, a Provincial Councilor and acting Diyawadana Nilame of the Temple of the Tooth, as well as long-serving Members of Parliament Salinda Dissanayake and Earl Gunasekara.

In the military and public services, distinguished alumni include Air Vice-Marshal Rohan Amerasekera, who commanded the Royal Ceylon Air Force, Charles Edmund Godakumbura, who served as the Commissioner of Archaeology in Ceylon from 1956 to 1967, and Victor A. Nicholas, Postmaster General of Ceylon, stand out. The academic sphere counts Sarath Amunugama, the founding Vice-Chancellor of the University of the Visual & Performing Arts and former Vice-Chancellor of the University of Kelaniya, among its alumni.

Notable alumni in the arts and media include: Ruwan Costa, film director and cinematographer, actors Sanath Gunathilake and Sanath Wimalasiri, singer Dhanith Sri, and dramatist R. R. Samarakoon. In the field of sports, Kingswood has produced outstanding figures including rugby union players Chethiya Wadugodapitiya and Fazil Marija, powerlifter Ransilu Jayathilake, weightlifter Indika Dissanayake, a Commonwealth Games silver medallist, and Freddie White, captain of the Sri Lanka men’s national field hockey team who was once regarded as Asia’s best goalkeeper.

== Notable teachers ==
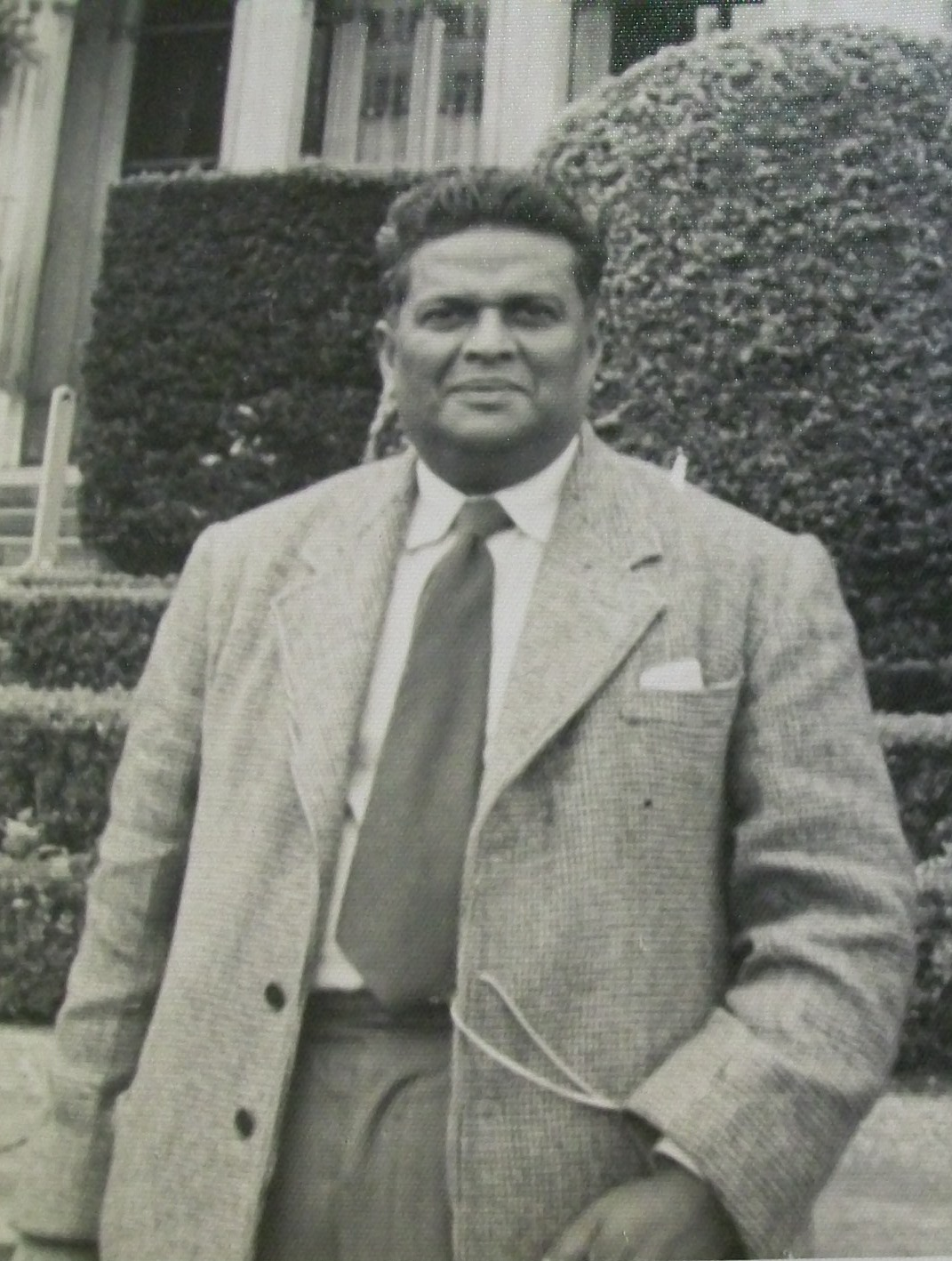
Aelian Corea (Former Master of Kingswood College)

- Dudley de Silva - Director of Technical Education, Ministry of Education
- J. C. A. Corea - Sri Lankan educationist

== Lineage ==
Boys High's School, Kandy
Kingswood College, Kandy

== Kingswood College Union ==
The Kingswood OBA (Old Boys' Association) formally known as Kingswood College Union was founded in 1904. The Kingswood Union was set up to further the interests of the college, its past and present members, teachers, and parents.
