= Rizwe Mohammed =

Mohammed Ibrahim Mohammed Rizwe

President of All Ceylon Jamiyyathul Ulama

Mufti
- In office June 2004 – Current
- Preceded by: Ash-Sheikh M. M. A. Mubarak Al-Madani

Personal details
- Born: 28 August 1961 Kandy, Sri Lanka
- Education: Kingswood College, Kandy
- Profession: President of All Ceylon Jamiyyathul Ulama
- Known for: International Religious Speaker

Mohammed RIZWE Ibrahim (known as Mohammed Ibrahim Mohammed Rizwe) is the President of All Ceylon Jamiyyathul Ulama. Since 2003, Mufti M.I.M. Rizwe has been the President of All Ceylon Jamiyyathul Ulama (ACJU), the supreme body of Islamic Theologians in Sri Lanka, inaugurated in 1924, incorporated by the Parliamentary Act No. 51 of 2000.

He plays an active role in his capacity as a Mufti (Judge) and as the President of ACJU that has more than 10,000 members as Scholars with an Executive Committee of more than 55 scholars, running this organisation with its 163 branches throughout the island in 28 districts.

Getting his primary and secondary education at Kingswood College, Kandy he continued his education until he read M.A. in Arabic. He specialised in Islamic Jurisprudence in 1988.

He has also travelled to several countries in Asia, Middle East, Africa, Europe and North America for the purpose of Islamic awareness, Islamic education and promoting peace and coexistence.

His profession is Advisor-Financial Institution, presently providing his consultation and advisory services to Amana Investments, Amana Takaful, Bank of Ceylon, Peoples Leasing in Sri Lanka, Maldives Islamic Bank and Male Izumi Enterprise, Japan.

== Education ==
1965 - 1977 Primary and secondary education at Kingswood College, Kandy, Sri Lanka

1978 - 1986 Al Alimiyya Course at Jamiyyathul Uloomil Islamiya Karachi, Pakistan

1986 - 1988 MA Arabic & MA Islamiyya qualifying at the Shahaadhathul Alimiyya Examinations, Wifaqul Madarisil Arabiya, Pakistan

1988 Specialized in Islamic Jurisprudence (Al Takhassus Fil Fiqhil Islami) Jamiyyathul Uloomil Islamiya, Pakistan

== National commitments ==
a) President of All Ceylon Jamiyyathul Ulama (ACJU), an organization that plays an active role as the Islamic religious higher authority of Sri Lanka with more than 6,000 active members and Ex Officio President of various committees of the ACJU such as Education, Fatwa, Halaal, Hilaal, Publications, Maktab, Propagation, Islamic Economics & Finance, Social Services and Council of Corporation & Coordination.

b) Advisor on Non Interest Banking for following leading Financial Institutions in Sri Lanka

- a. Amana Investment Ltd,
- b. Amana Takaful Ltd,
- c. Bank of Ceylon,
- d. Peoples Leasing

c) Founder & the Director of Islamic Careline Counseling (Guarantee) Limited, which provides individuals with the support and service to overcome underlying problems. In this spirit, Careline provides services such as counselling and training, striving to build a better society overall through its efforts and especially to address problems of women

d) Founder Member of Mahmoud Institute, which was established for the sole purpose of developing the skills of Scholars to face the current challenges prevailing in the community

e) Member of the Inter Religious Advisory Board for His Excellency the President of Sri Lanka since May 2016 and an Executive Member of the Supreme Council of Congress of Religions – Sri Lanka

f) President of the Board of Directors & Advisor to a numerous Arabic Colleges in locally as well as internationally.

g) Lecturer at Rashad Arabic College, for last 2 decades in the field of Science of Hadith.

== International commitments ==
a) Member of the Shariah Board of Maldives Islamic Bank b) Adviser Izumi Enterprise, Japan

== Personal Achievements ==
a) Mufti M.I.M. Rizwe is known as a Peace Lover has promoted harmony across the globe for the last 3 decades even before holding the position as President at ACJU.

b) He has done more than 25,000 lectures in the last 3 decades in promoting peace and coexistence in the community locally as well as internationally.

c) Under the leadership and guidance of Mufti M.I.M. Rizwe a team collectively worked in developing strategies to bridge Unity among the Muslim Community and to Co-exist with other faiths. As a result, two important declarations were derived and published under ACJU:

1. Declaration of Unity (http://www.acju.lk/en/published/item/664-declaration-of-unity) 2. Declaration of Coexistence (http://www.acju.lk/en/published/item/565-declaration-of-coexistence)

d) Mufti M.I.M. Rizwe has also been selected among the 500 most influential Muslims worldwide. The evaluation is done annually by the Royal Islamic Strategy Study Centre based in Amman, Jordan (www.rissc.jo) (http://themuslim500.com/profile/m-i-m-rizvi-mufthi).

== Major conferences attended ==
e) Attended International Conference ‘Religions for Peace’ held in Kyoto, Japan

f) Presented paper on ‘Education and its importance to Muslim Minorities in non Muslim Asian Countries’ at International Conference on ‘Jurisprudence of Minorities in the Light of the Objectives of Islamic Law’ (Maqasidal Al Shariah) organized by Rabita, World Muslim League, jointly organized by International Institute of Islamic Thought and Civilization and the Department of Fiqh and Usul Al Fiqh – Malaysia

g) Presented a Paper on “Good Citizenship and Obedience to Those in Authority” in Malaysia,

h) Presented a paper on “The New Movements of Thoughts in Islamic World and Their Adverse Effects on Muslim Nations in Asia Pacific Countries: With reference to the Sri Lankan Context” at Muslim Religious Leaders’ Summit in Turkey, Istanbul.

i) Attended International Conference “World Muslim Minorities Summit” held in Istanbul, Turkey and “High level Consultations of World Muslim Scholars on Wasatiyyat al – Islam” held in Bogor, Indonesia.

j) Mufti M.I.M. Rizwe conducted and attended several programs in Asian, Middle Eastern, African, European and North American countries for the purpose of Islamic awareness, Islamic education and promoting peace and coexistence. thumb
