= J. P. Jayasena =

Sri Lankan politician (1921–1990)

Senator of Ceylon

Personal details
- Born: 25 July 1921 Kandy
- Died: 21 December 1990 (aged 69) Kandy Lakeside Hospital
- Party: Sri Lanka Freedom Party
- Spouse: Danawathie Jayasena nee Gunatunga
- Relations: Father: Mr P M John, Mother: P M Gunathillaka, Brother: Senator P M Jayasena
- Children: Mahinda Jayasena (Son), Padmini Jayasena (Daughter)
- Education: Kingswood College, Kandy
- Occupation: Landed Proprietor,
- Profession: Educationist, Philanthropist
- Vice President of the SLFP, Volunteer English Teacher at Kadugannawa Sri Nivasa Pirivena, Director of the Sathosa, Usawasama, Salusala and Janawasama from 1970-1977, Member of the Sri Lanka delegation to Arab Baath Socialist Conference held in April, 1977 in Iraq

J. P. Jayasena (1921-1990) was a Ceylonese Senator. He was educated at the Kingswood College, Kandy. where he passed his Metriculation Examination.
