= Fred White (footballer, born 1916) =

English footballer

Personal information
- Full name: Frederick White
- Date of birth: 5 December 1916
- Place of birth: Wolverhampton, Staffordshire, England
- Date of death: 13 January 2007 (aged 90)
- Place of death: Sheffield, England
- Height: 6 ft 1 in (1.85 m)
- Position: Goalkeeper

Youth career
- –: Wolverhampton Boys

Senior career*
| Years | Team | Apps | (Gls) |
| 19??–1935 | Wolverhampton Wanderers | 0 | (0) |
| 1935–1937 | Everton | 0 | (0) |
| 1937–1950 | Sheffield United | 44 | (0) |
| 1939 | → Wrexham (guest) | 0 | (0) |
| 1939–1940 | → Rotherham United (guest) | 0 | (0) |
| 1942–1943 | → Grimsby Town (guest) | 0 | (0) |
| 1944–1945 | → Mansfield Town (guest) | 0 | (0) |
| 1944–1945 | → Sheffield Wednesday (guest) | 0 | (0) |
| 1945–1946 | → Nottingham Forest (guest) | 0 | (0) |
| 1950–1951 | Lincoln City | 42 | (0) |
| 1951–1952 | Gainsborough Trinity | | |
- * Club domestic league appearances and goals

Frederick White (5 December 1916 – January 2007) was an English footballer who played as a goalkeeper. Born in Wolverhampton he made 86 appearances in the Football League for Sheffield United and Lincoln City, as well as having spells with Wolverhampton Wanderers, Everton and Gainsborough Trinity.

== Career ==
=== Playing career ===
White began his career as an amateur with Wolverhampton Wanderers but failed to make an appearance fir them in league football. Despite this, after a glowing scouting report White was asked for a trial with fellow First Division club Everton, for whom he duly signed in May 1935. Once again White failed to make a league appearance for Everton's first and moved on to Sheffield United in May 1937 together with winger Charlie Leyfield.

When White joined United, incumbent keeper Jack Smith was midway through a sequence of over 200 consecutive league appearances for the club so White was forced to bide his time in the reserves. White was not to make a first team appearance until December 1939 during a wartime match against Sheffield Wednesday. White played regularly for the Blades during the war along with guest appearances for Wrexham, Rotherham United, Grimsby Town, Mansfield Town, Sheffield Wednesday and Nottingham Forest.

White finally made his Football League debut for Sheffield United in 1947, ten years after he signed for the club, briefly establishing himself as first-choice goalkeeper, making 44 appearances for the Blades in the First and Second divisions. White lost his place in the first half of the 1949–50 season, and was transfer-listed at his own request in February 1950, moving to Lincoln City for £200 in June 1950. He spent the 1950–51 season with Lincoln playing in the Third Division North, missing only four first-team matches. In August 1951 White moved into non-league football with Gainsborough Trinity, where he remained for a season before being forced to retire through injury.

=== Later career ===
Following his retirement from playing, White returned to Sheffield United to work part-time as a coach and later a coach between 1955 and 1970. He later scouted for Leeds United before working for manager Jim Smith at a number of clubs.

== Personal life ==
White's father ran a construction company and it was there that White worked on essential construction work for the duration of World War II. Following his retirement from playing in 1952, White became a salesman in the building trade while working part-time as part of Sheffield United's backroom staff. White was married to Margaret and the pair settled in Sheffield at the end of his playing career. White died in January 2007 at the age of 90.
