= Louis Edmund Blaze =

Sri Lankan educationist (1861–1951)

Louis Edmund Blaze JP, OBE
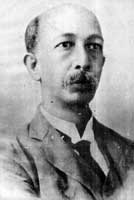
- Born: 29 September 1861; Kandy, Ceylon
- Died: 4 August 1951 (aged 89); Colombo
- Education: Trinity College; University of Calcutta
- Occupations: Educator, author, historian
- Known for: Founder and first principal of Kingswood College, Kandy
- Term: 1891–1923
- Successor: E. Pearson
- Spouse: Alice Maud née Avery
- Children: Irene Clarice; Alice Rachel; Marie Louise
- Parents: Louis Ezekiel Blaze (father); Henrietta Charlotte née Garnier (mother)
- Relatives: John Thomas (brother); Robert Ezekiel (brother); John Henry Blaze (grandfather); Margareta Caroline née de Joodt (grandmother)

Louis Edmund Blaze, JP, OBE, BA (Calcutta), (29 September 1861 – 4 August 1951) was a Sri Lankan educationist and the founder and the first principal of Kingswood College, Kandy (1891–1923).

== Biography ==
Louis Edmund Blaze was born on 29 September 1861 in Kandy, the fifth child and fourth son of Louis Ezekiel Blaze (1827–1894), a coffee merchant, and Henrietta Charlotte née Garnier (1833–1899). His grand parents, John Henry Blaze and Margareta Caroline née de Joodt, were headmaster and headmistress of schools in Paiyagala in the Kalutara District. His eldest brother, John Thomas (1853–1921), studied at Lincoln College, Oxford, was admitted to the bar in June 1877 and became a lecturer in law and editor of the newspaper, Ceylon Examiner. One of his other brothers, Robert Ezekiel (1863–1916), was the crown proctor of Badulla.

== Early studies ==
Blaze was one of the first group of students to study at Trinity College, Kandy (then known as the Trinity College and Collegiate School), at the time of the founding of the school by Rev. Richard Collins for the Church Mission Society in 1872. Whilst at Trinity he produced a school magazine, which appeared in manuscript form, on 15 May 1876, and later issued fortnightly as The Gleaner. In 1880 at age nineteen he passed the first examination in Arts at the University of Calcutta, following which he took up an appointment as the head master of the lower school at Trinity College. Uncertain as to whether his career lay in education he resigned a month later to become a law student however he was more interested in literature and cultivated a talent for writing poetry. In December 1882 he returned to Calcutta completing his Bachelor of Arts examination at the University. Between 1883 and 1890 Blaze taught for nearly two years in Calcutta, first at the Bishop’s College and then at St. James' School. After that he served as a second master and as acting head master at the Boys High School in Lahore. In these years, he read numerous works and found inspiration in the life and works of Dr. Thomas Arnold (1795–1842) the headmaster of Rugby School. In this respect he wrote, "Anecdotes of Eaton, Harrow and Winchester which I eagerly read and remembered revealed much and their school songs stirred me deeply, as indeed they stir all youthful souls". Then he thought of founding a public school by himself, writing "What disturbed me in Ceylon schools and in all other schools known to me were the strange distance between Teacher and Pupil and the needlessly hostile relations that existed between them. Another thing that I specially disliked was the craze for judging the merits of a school by the examination results." He returned to Ceylon in January 1891.

== Kingswood College ==
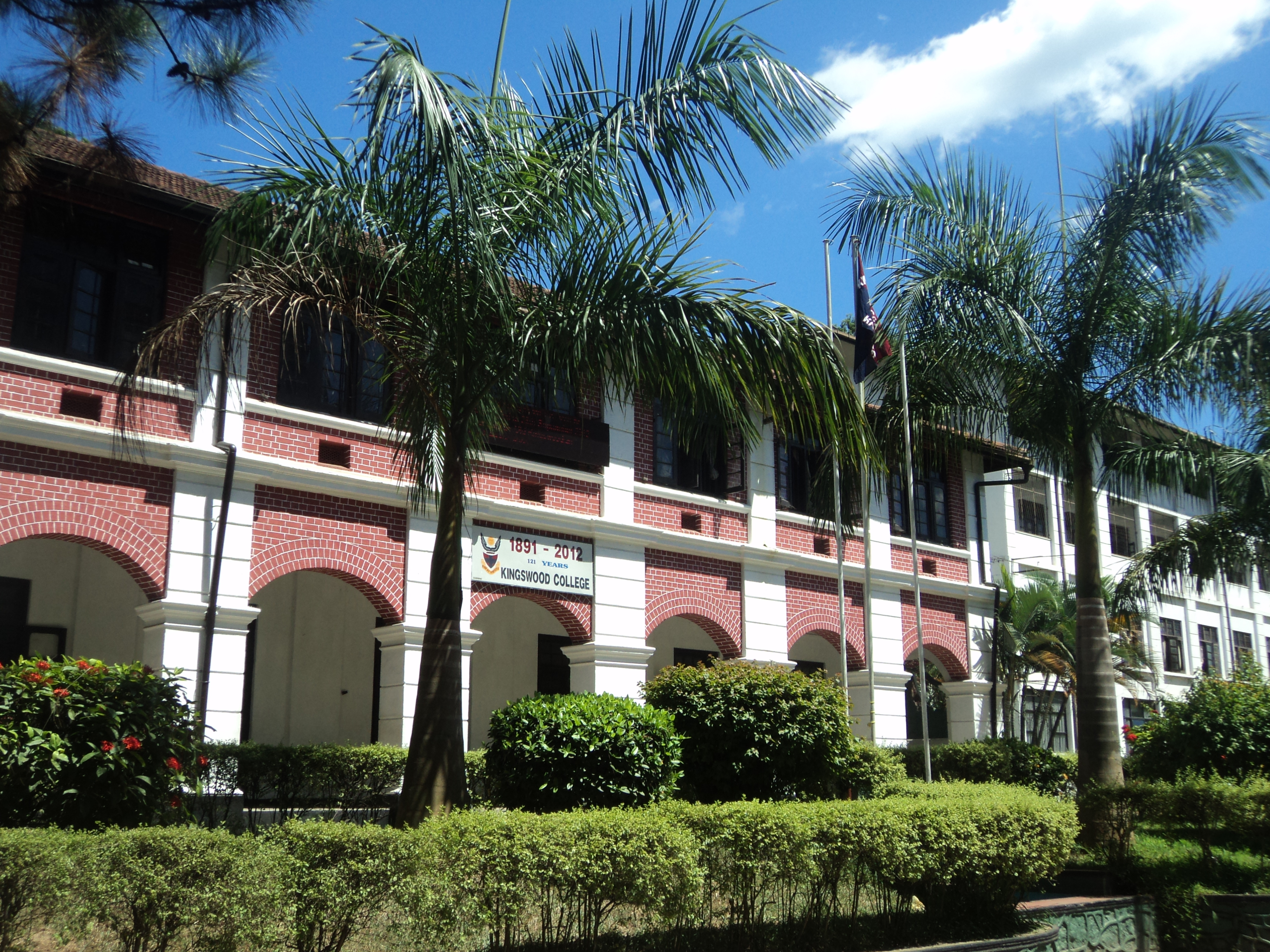
Kingswood College, Kandy, Sri Lanka

On 4 May 1891 Blaze opened 'The Boys High School' on Pavilion Street in the centre of Kandy, with eleven pupils. Blaze modelled the school on the traditional English Public School system, even naming the four houses at the school: Eton; Harrow; Winchester and Rugby. As the school did not qualify for government assistance, Blaze had to hand over the struggling institution to the Wesleyan Mission in July 1894. Blaze was responsible for introducing rugby to schools in Ceylon, having learnt the game and the rules whilst he was teaching in India, he started coaching his pupils in the sport from the year the school was established. The first ever inter-school match in Ceylon was held on 11 August 1906 between Kingswood and Trinity at the Bogambara Grounds, which ended in a six-all draw. On 12 January 1898, Blaze moved the school to Brownrigg Street, where the school was renamed, Kingswood Public School. In 1900 he wrote a textbook, History of Ceylon, the first comprehensive school textbook on the history of Sri Lanka and the prescribed history textbook for middle school until the late 1930s (with ten editions being published in that time). In 1902 the school had the distinction of appointing the first lady teacher to the staff of a Boys School in the country. On 30 September 1904 he established the Kingswood Union, the association for old boys at the college, for which he was unanimously elected as president. In 1914 he authored The Story of Lanka, another detailed history of the island, which became the Middle School school text for history (it was re-printed six times). During the first sixty years of the institution, the school eventually became one of the most prominent Public Schools in Kandy. Before his retirement he planned the removal of the school from the small premises it occupied in Brownrigg Street relocating it, in 1925, to the village of Wel-Ata in Mulgampola, then a quiet suburb of Kandy. Blaze retired from the principalship of the school on 31 December 1923, after serving in that position for thirty years.

== Retirement ==
Upon his retirement Blaze left Kandy and settled in Colombo, where he accepted the role as the editor of The Ceylon Independent, the workload however proved to be too great and he was offered several educational appointments and accepted for a short period the position as principal of the Prince of Wales' College, Moratuwa. For many years he was the president of the English Association, as well as being an active member of Historical Association, the Royal Asiatic Society and the Ceylon Geographical Society, who honoured him by electing him a life member.

In 1934 he authored Kingswood For Ever, The Story of Kingswood, Kandy, a historical account of the school that he founded. This was followed in 1936 by a book of verse, In Praise of Ceylon.

== Personal ==
On 16 December 1891 he married Alice Maud née Avery (8 March 1865 – 1 March 1912) in Negombo. They had three daughters: Irene Clarice (who died 16 August 1893); Alice 'Ray' Rachel; and Marie Louise (who died 9 November 1917). The couple's only surviving daughter, Ray, became a journalist and played a prominent role in the early years of the Girl Guides Association.

Following his retirement he was made a Justice of the Peace for the Kandy district.

In 1929 he received the Order of the British Empire.

Blaze died on 4 August 1951, a few days after he had helped Kingswood College celebrate its Diamond Jubilee.

== Bibliography ==
- Blaze, L. E. (1900). History of Ceylon. Colombo: Christian Literature Society. ISBN 81-206-1841-6.
- Blaze, L. E. (1914). The Story of Lanka : Outlines of the History of Ceylon from the earliest times to the coming of the Portuguese. Wellawatte: Christian Literature Society. ISBN 978-812-061074-3.
- Blaze, L. E. (1934). Kingswood For Ever, the Story of Kingswood, Kandy. Colombo Apothecaries Company.
- Blaze, L. E. (1936). In Praise of Ceylon.
