= Dhanith Sri =

Sri Lankan singer and composer

- ධනිත් ශ්‍රී
- Born: 22 December 1994 (age 31); Kandy, Sri Lanka
- Education: Vidyartha College Kandy, Kingswood College Kandy, University of Peradeniya
- Occupations: Vocalist; songwriter; composer
- Years active: 2016-present
- Known for: Pandama

Dhanith Sri (Sinhala: ධනිත් ශ්‍රී; born 22 December 1994) is a Sri Lankan singer, composer and songwriter. He is considered one of the most popular artists in Sri Lanka. Dhanith entered the mainstream music industry with his 2018 hit "Pandama". The alternative rock feel of this song is complemented by his high-pitched vocals as well as the mix of Sri Lankan traditional drum beats and synthesizers. It became number one on TV and radio charts concurrently.

== Biography ==
Dhanith Sri was born on 22 December 1994 in Kandy, Sri Lanka. He was educated at Vidyartha College, Kandy and Kingswood College, Kandy. He graduated from University of Peradeniya with a specialised degree in electrical and electronic engineering.

== Career ==
Dhanith released singles such as "Jeewithe" and "Obe As" when he was a teenager and was also a dancer, a talent he showcased in his music videos back in the day. Dhanith has also been featured in other singles such as "Lakmawuni", alongside various local artists in a tribute to the victims of the Easter Sunday tragedy and Sebala Puthu with Bathiya and Santhush. And also Dumal Warnakulasuriya. Crew member of Nadagama. Theme song of Dam (දාම්) was sung by Dhanith.

In 2025, Dhanith was recognised within the music industry, winning two prestigious awards at the Derana CloseUp Music Video Awards for his Rap Album "Raplanthaya" released in 2023. His music video for “Mawa Hoyan” won the Best Alternative Video award where he Co-Directed with Sahan Wickramarachchi, while his work for “Aprakashitha” earned him the Best R&B Video award, Directed by Dhanith Sri.

== Discography ==
Year	Title	Collaborated Artists	Length	Ref.
2018	Pandama		03:05	
2018	Naukawa		03:34	
2019	Sandaganawa		04:08	
2020	Gindara	Randhir Witana	03:24	
2020	Ehema Dewal Na Hithe Mage		03:57	
2020	Alokawarsha		05:19	
2020	Adariye		04:06	
2021	Niwalanna Ma		03:10	
2021	Roja		04:49	
2021	Wedikawe		03:51	
2023	Amme		03:26	
2024	Ithihasaye Katha		05:01	
2024	Aloka		03:21	
2024	Aetha Isawwe		05:37	
