= Victor A. Nicholas =

Lieutenant-Colonel Victor Albert Nicholas, MBE, (4 May 1897 - 1956) was the sixteenth Postmaster General of Ceylon, serving between 1951 and 1956, and the second Ceylonese to hold the post.

Victor Albert Nicholas was born on 4 May 1897 in Badulla, the third child of Joseph Richard Nicholas and Rose née Anthony. He received his secondary education at Kingswood College, Kandy. He joined the Post and Telecommunications Department of Ceylon in 1915, at the age of 18. Following the outbreak of World War I he enlisted in March 1917, serving with the Royal Engineers on the Western Front and in German East Africa. He was discharged from service in January 1920, whereupon he re-joined the Post Department. On 3 June 1922 he married Constance Mildred Fernando, the daughter of Alfred Michael Fernando (1870-1930) and Mabel Elsie née Bartholomeusz (1875-1901).

In the 1950 King's Birthday Honours he was made a member of the British Empire (Civil Division) for his services as assistant postmaster general of Ceylon. He was appointed as the Postmaster General in 1951 and was responsible for initiating the numbering of the Colombo city suburbs: Colombo 01 (Colombo Fort), Colombo 02 (Slave Island); Colombo 03 (Kollupitiya); Colombo 04 (Bambalapitiya); Colombo 05 (Havelock Town); Colombo 06 (Wellawatta); Colombo 07 (Cinnamon Gardens) etc.

He retired in early 1956 and on 1 April 1956 was appointed to the Commonwealth Telecommunications Board. He died in London in the same year, at the age of 59.

Government offices
Preceded by Abdon Ignatius Perera	Postmaster General of Ceylon; 1951–1956	Succeeded by H. E. Seneviratne
