= Charles Godakumbura =

Sri Lankan historian

- Born: 5 December 1907; Chilaw, Sri Lanka
- Died: 7 February 1977 (aged 69); Burma (Myanmar)
- Education: Kingswood College; University of Ceylon; University of London
- Occupations: Academic, Historian
- Known for: Scholarly works of Sinhala Language, Sri Lankan History and archaeology
- Spouse(s): Chandra née Ranhotti, Chandra née Rajapaksa (m.1952)
- Children: 4

Doctor Charles Edmund Godakumbura (5 December 1907 – 7 February 1977) was the Commissioner of Archaeology in Ceylon (Sri Lanka) from 1956 to 1967.

== Early life ==
He was born on 5 December 1907 in Chilaw in the North Western province of the country. He was the second in a family of five siblings and his mother died when he was very young. Godakumbura received his primary education at the school where his father was a teacher.

== Education ==
In the later years, he continued his studies Kingswood College in Kandy. Concurrently, he attended classes at Sangaraja Pirivena, Kandy where he studied Pali and Sanskrit. In 1934, he completed his BA (General) examination at the University of London in Sinhalese, Pali and Sanskrit. In 1936, he passed the BA (Hons) examination in Indo-Aryan Studies. In 1938, he was awarded the MA in Indo-Aryan Studies. In 1945 he was awarded a Ph.D. from the University of London for his thesis on Sinhalese Syntax. In 1954 he was awarded a D.Litt. from the University of London for his work in Pali, Sanskrit and Sinhala.

== Teaching ==
After getting through the Cambridge Senior, he joined the tutorial staff of Kingswood College. He later joined Nalanda College, Colombo while also working as a visiting lecturer in the Department of Oriental Studies of the University College, Colombo. He was recalled to continue teaching at the School of Oriental and African Studies of the University of London taking an absence of leave from government service. This ended in 1959 when he returned to take up the position as the Commissioner of Archaeology.

== Commissioner of Archaeology ==
Whilst based in Colombo, he joined the Department of Archaeology in the early 1950s as the deputy Commissioner when Professor (then Dr) Senarath Paranavithana was the Commissioner. Paranavithana was the first Sri Lankan to be appointed the head of the Department. He was confirmed as the Commissioner when Paranavithana retired in 1956, although he was still in England. He subsequently moved back to Sri Lanka to take up the post of Commissioner, a role in which he continued to occupy until his retirement in 1967.

== Personal life ==
Godakumbura married Chandra née Ranhotti, whom he met during his days at University of Colombo, and they had one daughter. After separating from Chandra, he married Chandra née Rajapaksa in 1952, with whom he had two had sons and a daughter.

== Later years ==
After retiring from the Archaeological Department Godakumbura served as the President of the Sri Lanka branch of the Royal Asiatic Society until 1970. During this time he continued contributing to local and international publications.

== Bibliography ==
- Godakumbra, Charles (1955). Sinhalese Literature. Colombo: Colombo Apothecaries' Company.
- Godakumbra, Charles; Pali Text Society (London) (1958). Samantakūṭavaṇṇanā of Veheda. London: Luzac.
- Godakumbra, Charles (1964). Budupilima = Buddha Statues. Colombo: Archaeological Department.
- Godakumbra, Charles; Fernando, W B Marcus (1965). Ancient City of Anuradhapura. Colombo: Archaeological Department.
- Godakumbra, Charles (1965). Ancient City of Polonnaruwa. Colombo: Archaeological Department.
- Godakumbra, Charles (1969). The Kotavehera at Dedigama. Colombo: Archaeological Department.
- Godakumbra, Charles (1988). Visuddhajanavilāsinī nāma Apadānaṭṭhakathā. Oxford: Pali text Society.
