= R. R. Samarakoon =

Sri Lankan actor and dramatist

R.R. Samarakoon ආර්. ආර්. සමරකෝන්
- Born: Ranasinghe Rajapakse Samarakoon; August 14, 1939; Nawalapitiya, Sri Lanka
- Died: August 1, 2010 (aged 71); Colombo
- Resting place: Wadduwa cemetery
- Education: St Andrew's Girls College, Nawalapitiya; Kingswood College, Kandy
- Occupations: Dramatist, playwright, translator, author
- Years active: 1965–2008
- Spouse(s): Molly Srima Samarakoon; Ramya Wanigasekara (m. 1987)
- Children: 2
- Awards: Best Theater production

Ranasinghe Rajapakse Samarakoon (17 July 1939 – 1 August 2010; Sinhala: ආර්. ආර්. සමරකෝන්) [Sinhala]), popularly known as R.R. Samarakoon, was a Sri Lankan dramatist, playwright, translator and author. One of the earliest pillars of Sri Lankan drama, he is well known for several stage plays directed and produced in 1970s including Kelani Palama and Ahasin Wetunu Minissu.

== Personal life ==
Samarakoon was born on 14 August 1939 in Dekinda village, Nawalapitiya. He started primary education from St Andrew's Girls College, Nawalapitiya and secondary education from Kingswood College, Kandy. He worked as a teacher of Kingswood for a brief period. Later he moved to Colombo for clerk post of co-operative wholesale corporation Sathosa. Later he worked as a translator and also held the post of Institutional Manager. In 1982, he was transferred to Jaffna for a political revenge. Instead, he quit his job and returned home. In 1995 he got back to work.

Samarakoon was married to Molly Srima Samarakoon and the couple had their first daughter born in October 1978. Her name was Niluka Tharangi Samarakoon. Unfortunately his marriage didn't last long and after 7 years he separated and lived together with a popular artist Ramya Wanigasekara She was born on 17 July in Kotiyakumbura, Kegalle as the fifth child in a family with seven siblings. Her father from Hettimulla, Kegalle was an estate superintendent and mother was from Eheliyagoda. Ramya has two elder sisters, two elder brothers and two younger brothers. She started primary education from Ampe Maha Vidyalaya, Kotiyakumbura. After attending to many school, she completed education finally from Ruwanwella Royal College.

The affair started during the stage play Kelani Palama. The Samarakoon and Ramaya Wanigasekara had their daughter in 1989, her name was Buddhika Mudithani. Buddhika acted in Kelani Palama in little age as "Surangani". She excelled at stage costume designing.

Samarakoon died on 1 August 2010 at the age of 71 following a brief illness. His remains were kept at his residence, No 45, Dibbadda Road, Thalpitiya, Wadduwa North. The funeral was held at the Wadduwa cemetery in August 2010.

== Career ==
During school times, Samarakoon played a female role in the school play Vidura. However, he quit from acting since then and started to script writing. He wrote a detective story while in the school, which was later published as a novel Wes Muhunu. Samarakoon enters drama as a pioneer in bringing together Sathosa artists and creating Sathosa art in 1967. His first play was produced in 1968 under the direction of Sathosa Drama Circle.

In 1965, Samarakoon made his maiden stage play Ledak Nethi Ledek. Samarakoon's second play is Charitha Dekak which came on stage under the direction of Sathosa Drama Circle in 1967. The play is considered to be a psychoanalytic work on gender relations.

In 1971, he produced the play Ahasin Wetunu Minissu, where he won nine State awards including four major state awards: Best Script, Best Production, Best Actor and Best Supporting Actress. He went England, France, USA and many other countries to stage the drama as well. His award winning novel Ge Kurullo won the award for the best work of fiction in 1971. The book was also translated into Russian and Tamil languages. Samarakoon returned to drama in 1975 with the play Idama which won the Best Independent Essay and Best Actress awards at the State Drama Festival and four Merit Certificates for Outstanding Performance.

In the same year, he won the award for the best original script at the State Drama Festival. On 25 October 1978, he produced the popular stage play Kelani Palama. Earlier he selected actress Chandra Kaluarachchi for the main role "Matilda". However she was pregnant at that time, where Samarakoon shifted to popular radio artist and his future wife Ramya Wanigasekara for the role. Still after his death, Wanigasekara produced the play and acted in the role for 41 consecutive years. The play is considered as a milestone in history of Sri Lankan theater.

Samarakoon produced the stage plays Idama (1975), Jailer Unnahe (1986), Doowili (1990) and Raja Kathawa (1991), where Wanigasekara acted in all of them. Doowili is a drama that has gained rapid popularity due to its production on the subject of the world of a superpower in Cinnamon Gardens, Colombo. He also produced the plays Charitha Dekak (1967), Minihek (1979), Kaputu Bo (2003) and Kakul Hathare Ilandariya (2008). The play Kaputu Bo was a new production that changed the title and cast of his second play, Charitha Dekak, but not a new drama.

Even though worked as a translator, Samarakoon was a freelance writer. Later he wrote many books such as Ek Sabhya Kathavak, Akalanka, Asammatha Adarayak, Ran Tharuwa, Thala Mala, Chandra Thapaya, Sundara Saha Sobani, Heta Kaluwara Dawasak, Sanda Eliya Kaluwarai and Loku Akka. In 1994, he wrote the novel Eka Kuse Upan Evun which is considered as one of his best publications. His only poem collection was Rathriya Awadi Nowe released in 2002.
