= Richmond Hill, Galle =

Richmond Hill is a hill in Galle, the capital of southern Sri Lanka. The hill is located in the village of Kumbalwella. Situated on the hill is Richmond College, a primary and secondary school for boys, which is the first Methodist school in Asia.

== History ==
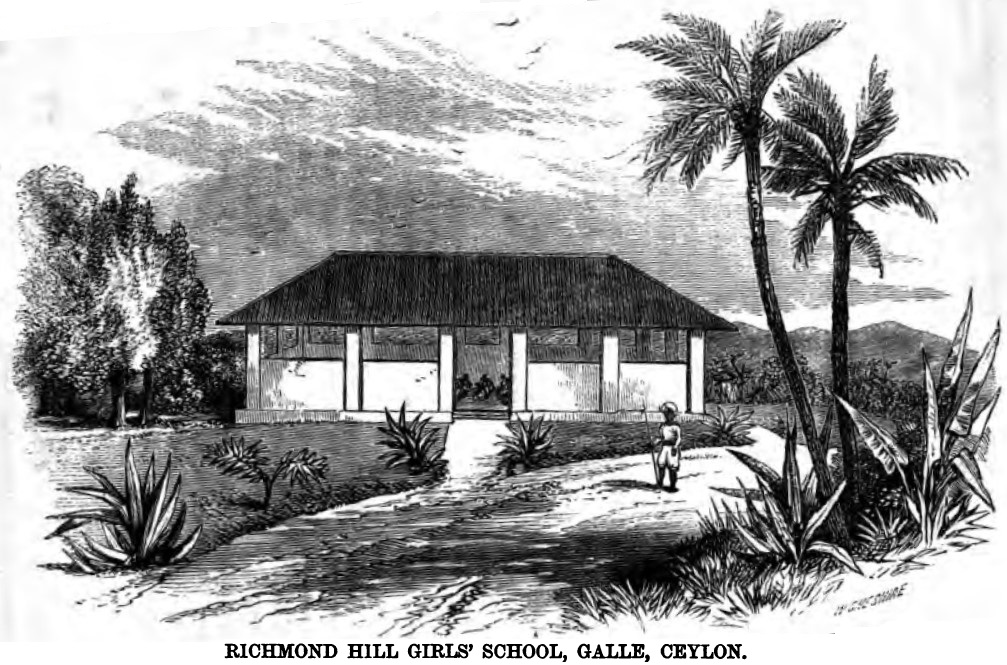
Richmond Hill Girls' School, Galle, Ceylon (1868)

The original 6.9 ha (17 acres) land parcel was purchased in 1839 by Dr. Robert Seymour Croxton Sillery, M.D., who established a farm and a coconut estate on the property. At the time the land was known as Mount Seymour or Sillery's Hill. In 1857 Rev. Joseph Rippon, the head of the Methodist missionaries in Galle persuaded the Wesleyan Methodist Missionary Trust Association in England to purchase the land, for Rs. 937/50, with a view to establishing an industrial school, a school for boys and girls and a theological institution on the site. Rippon had his theological training at Richmond College in Surrey and either out of love for his former college or because of the scenic splendour of the local counterpart, renamed the location Richmond Hill. Rippon's successor, Rev. George Baugh, renamed the Richmond Hill Girls' Boarding school as Whitefield Road Girls' School, in 1871 (which was renamed the Girls' high School in 1876) and upgraded the Galle School to a collegiate school in 1876, and named it the Galle High School, in 1876 (which was renamed Richmond College in 1882 on a suggestion made by Rev Samuel Hill who was the Principal). Since the original purchase a number of other surrounding lots have been acquired and in 1906 the total estate was approximately 11 ha (27 acres) in size.

In 2013 the Methodist Church at Richmond Hill was declared was formally recognised by the Government as an Archaeological Protected Monument.

== Richmond Hill Railway Station ==
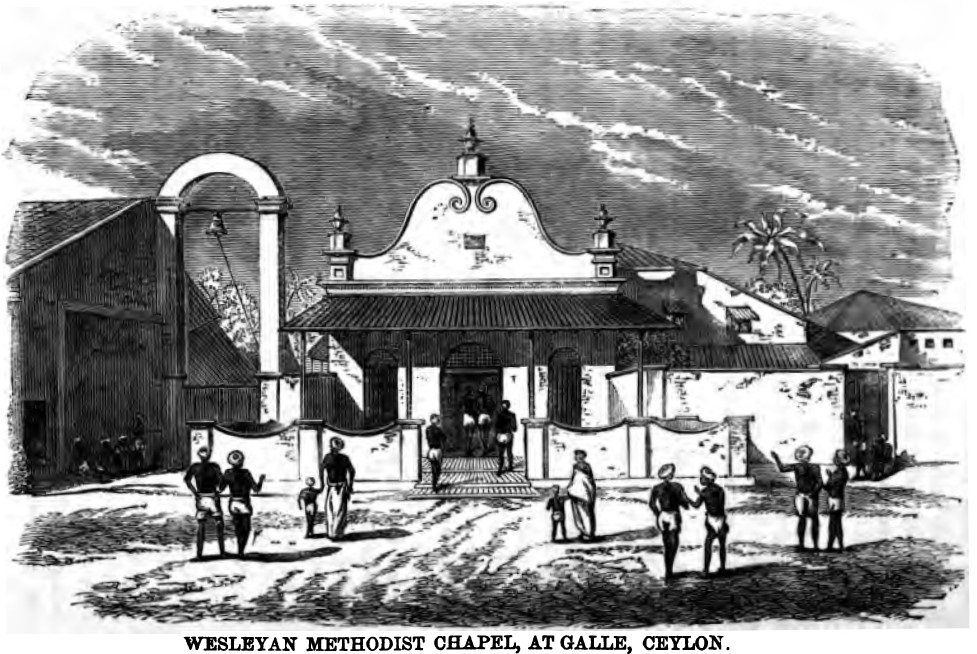
Wesleyan Methodist Chapel, at Galle, Ceylon (1868)

The Richmond Hill railway station is the first railway station in Sri Lanka built and named after a school. The Richmond Hill Station is located on the Coastal line between the Piyadigama railway station and Galle Railway Station. It was constructed during the early 1900s for the benefit of children who attend the many schools around the area. The station is located at the base of the hill approximately 200 m (660 ft) from the Richmond Hill Road.
