= Freddie White (field hockey) =

Sri Lankan field hockey player

- Born: 1930
- Died: 13 August 2022 (aged 91–92); Perth, Australia
- Other names: Fredrick White
- Education: Kingswood College, Kandy
- Occupations: field hockey player, footballer
- Years active: 1948-1967
- Known for: Asia's best goalkeeper in field hockey during his playing career
- Spouse: Lavender
- Relatives: Duncan White (brother)

Fredrick White also more commonly and popularly known as Freddie White (1930 – 13 August 2022) was a Ceylonese field hockey player and footballer who also served as the former captain of the Sri Lanka men's national field hockey team. He was known for his exploits in the sport of field hockey. He was regarded as Asia's best field hockey goalkeeper at one time despite the fact that India and Pakistan had ruled world hockey at that time coinciding with his playing career. He was also easily the best player during arguably Sri Lanka's best ever field hockey team and he is also considered as the greatest ever field hockey player to have donned the national jersey of Ceylon. He cemented the reputation as Ceylon's best ever goalkeeper for nearly two decades. His elder brother Duncan White was an Olympic silver medalist in athletics. He permanently resided in Australia after his retirement from field hockey.

== Career ==
He made his field hockey debut at the age of 18 as a schoolboy against an Indian Olympic hockey team in 1948 and coincidentally his elder brother Duncan White secured Ceylon's first ever Olympic medal in the same year at the London Olympics in men's 400m hurdles. He began playing for the Burgher Recreation Club from 1948 up until 1950. He represented Defence Services in the first National Hockey Championships way back in 1957. He was appointed as the vice-captain of the Ceylon team during their tour of Madras in 1957. He also captained the Colombo HA team at the 1959 National Championships. He later switched to Havelock SC and won Andriesz Shield as well as Pioneer Cup with the club.

During his playing career, he received spotlight from the Indian field hockey fraternity for his notable work as a goalkeeper. He impressed as a goalkeeper during Ceylon's two match home test series against defending Olympic field hockey champions India in 1960 whereas the Indian national field hockey team manager BL Gupta and Indian national captain Leslie Claudius applauded White for his exceptional glovework. Both Gupta and Claudius heaped praise on White and both indicated their firm desire to have Freddie White in their national team as India's first-choice goalkeeper for the 1960 Summer Olympics in Rome had White originally been an Indian national.

Sri Lanka's best years in field hockey coincided with the playing career of White which was even highlighted by former Indian veteran hockey player Dhyan Chand who insisted that Ceylon was the world's sixth best team in global field hockey as he made such a critical statement during Ceylon's 1959/60 tour to the Northern part of India. He also joined the Sri Lanka Army in the inter club tournaments in the Annual Hockey Nationals.

He also captained Sri Lankan hockey team during the 1966 Asian Games. Sri Lanka endured a tough run at the 1966 Asian Games as they secured a fifth-place finish out of eight teams in the men's field hockey competition where they defeated South Korea 1–0 in the consolation play-off. He retired from the sport in 1967 with last of his assignments as captain of the national side was a two test series against a strong Indian side. During the first test of the two test series, Sri Lanka lost by a margin of 1-0 which is still regarded as the best ever performance by Ceylonese hockey side against India.

== Personal life ==
He pursued his primary and secondary education at the Kingswood College, Kandy and at the school he played field hockey, cricket, football and athletics. He emigrated to Australia with his spouse Lavender in 1972 after bidding adieu to sporting career. His close cousin Penny White was the daughter-in-law of former Sri Lankan President J. R. Jayewardene. He died on 13 August 2022 in Perth, Australia due to illness.
