= Department of Archaeology (Sri Lanka) =

- පුරාවිද්‍යා දෙපාර්තමේන්තුව (Sinhala) தொல்பொருளியல் திணைக்களம் (Tamil)

Agency overview
- Formed: 1890
- Jurisdiction: Sri Lanka
- Agency executive: Thusitha Mendis, Head of the Department
- Website: www.archaeology.gov.lk

The Department of Archaeology (Sinhala: පුරාවිද්‍යා දෙපාර්තමේන්තුව, romanized: Purāvidyā Depārtamēntuva, Tamil: தொல்பொருளியல் திணைக்களம், romanized: Tolporuḷiyal Tiṇaikkaḷam) is a non-ministerial government department in Sri Lanka responsible for managing the archaeological heritage.

== History ==
In 1868, seven years after the establishment of the Archaeological Survey of India, Governor Sir Hercules Robinson appointed the Committee on Ancient Architecture in Ceylon, to obtain information regarding the ancient architectural works of Ceylon.

In 1871 Joseph Lawton was commissioned by the Committee to photograph the principal structures and ruins at Anuradhapura, Mihintale, Polonnaruwa and Sigirya. His photographs are used extensively in Smither's publication, Architectural Remains Anuradhapura, Ceylon: the Dugabas and Certain Other Ancient Ruined Structures.

Between 1873 and 1875, under the direction of Governor Sir William Gregory, a complete site survey of structural remains at Anuradhapura was undertaken. The work was carried out by James George Smither, the principal architect at the Public Works Department, who subsequently published in 1894, Architectural Remains Anuradhapura, Ceylon: the Dugabas and Certain Other Ancient Ruined Structures, which comprised information on Anuradhapura's stupas and other ancient ruined structures.

Between 1875 and 1879 Dr Paul Goldschmidt, a philologist and the pioneer of Sinhalese epigraphy, carried out a search of ancient inscriptions and original records. This work was continued by Dr. Edwin Muller and Maha Mudaliyar Louis W. de Zoysa.

Between 1884 and 1886, Stephen Montagu Burrows, the Assistant Government Agent in the North Central Province, was assigned the responsibility of supervising the archaeological works at Anuradhapura and Polonnaruwa. He published a book, The Buried Cities of Ceylon in 1885.

On 7 July 1890 Governor Sir Arthur Gordon, appointed Harry Charles Purvis Bell as the first Archaeological Commissioner and Head of the Archaeological Survey of Ceylon. The Survey consisted of the Commissioner, a European assistant commissioner, a native assistant, a clerk, and three draughtsmen. The first task given to the Survey was the exploration, excavation, mapping and conservation of historical monuments at Anuradhapura. In 1895 the Survey commenced work at Sigiriya and in May 1900 at Polonnaruwa. Between 1902 and 1907 John Still (the author of Jungle Tide) served as assistant commissioner.

On 8 December 1912 Edward Russell Ayrton was appointed Archaeological Commissioner, having previously worked as the assistant commissioner under Bell. On 18 May 1914 Ayrton drowned at Tissa Wewa in Tissamaharama. The Archaeological Department all but closed down, with only a skeleton staff, during World War I, with a series of acting heads. It wasn't until the appointment of Arthur Maurice Hocart in 1921 that the Department became more active. Hocart recognised the need to train young Ceylonese to work in the department, and amongst his protégées was Senarath Paranavithana, who was sent in 1923 to Ootacamund to train under the Government Epigraphist in India. In 1925 Hocart took a year's leave and returned to England. In his absence M. Wedderburn acted as Archaeology Commissioner. Upon his return in 1926 Hocart appointed Paranavithana as the Epigraphical assistant. When Hocart retired in 1929 C. F. Windsor took the role of Commissioner and at this time the head office of the Archaeological Department was relocated from Anuradhapura to Colombo.

In 1932 when Windsor retired Senarath Paranavithana became the first Sri Lankan to be appointed as head of the Department. In 1935 Albert Henry Longhurst took over the role of Archaeological Commissioner and Paranavithana was his Epigraphical assistant. Longhurst was previously the Superintendent of the Archaeological Survey of India. During his tenure in Ceylon he concentrated on the conservation of monuments, particularly in Polonnaruwa. With commencement of World War II all the major works of the department were suspended and Dr Paranavithana was appointed Commissioner.

In 1940, the State Council of Ceylon passed the Antiquities Ordinance formally giving legal authority to the Commissioner of Archaeology power over antiquities, archeological sites and excavations. After the country gained its independence the Archaeological Department went through a significant phase of expansion, with its activities expanded to almost every district on the island.

When Paranavithana retired in 1956 the position of Commissioner was taken by Charles Godakumbura, a role which he occupied until his retirement in 1967. Raja H. de Silva was then appointed the new Commissioner.

The head of the department, Anura Manatunga, was appointed to the position on 1 January 2020, following the retirement of Senarath Dissanayake in 2017. In mid-June 2023 Manatunga resigned following criticism of the department by President Ranil Wickremesinghe.

Professor Thusitha Mendis was appointed to the position of Director General of Archaeology on 14 March 2024, following Manatunga's retirement.

== Archaeological Commissioner ==
No.	Archeological Commissioner	Year (commence)	Year (complete)
1	Harry Charles Purvis Bell	1890	1892
2	Robert Wilson Ievers (Acting)	1892	1892
3	Harry Charles Purvis Bell	1893	1912
4	Edward Russell Ayrton	1912	1913
5	B. Constantine	1913	1914
6	Herbert Rayner Freeman (Acting)	1914	1918
7	F. G. Tyrrel (Acting)	1918	1920
8	A. W. Seymour (Acting)	1920	1921
9	G. F. R. Browning (Acting)	1921	1922
10	Arthur Maurice Hocart	1922	1924
11	M. Wedderburn (Acting)	1924	1925
12	Arthur Maurice Hocart	1925	1927
13	E. T. Dyson (Acting)	1927	1928
14	C. F. Windsor	1929	1929
15	J. Pearson (Acting)	1929	1930
16	C. F. Windsor	1930	1932
17	Senarath Paranavithana	1932	1934
18	Albert Henry Longhurst	1935	1939
19	Senarath Paranavithana	1940	1956
20	Charles Godakumbura	1956	1967
21	Raja H. de Silva	1967	1979
22	Saddhamangala Karunarathna	1979	1983
23	Roland Silva	1983	1990
24	M. H. Sirisoma	1990	1992
25	Siran Upendra Deraniyagala	1992	2001
26	W. H. Wijayapala	2001	2004
27	Senerath Dissanayake	2004	2017
28	P. B. Mandawala (Acting)	2017	2019
29	Senarath Dissanayake	2019	2020
30	Anura Manatunga	2021	2023
31	D. Thusitha Mendis	2024	current

== See also ==
- List of museums in Sri Lanka
