= Chethiya Wadugodapitiya =

Sri Lankan rugby union player

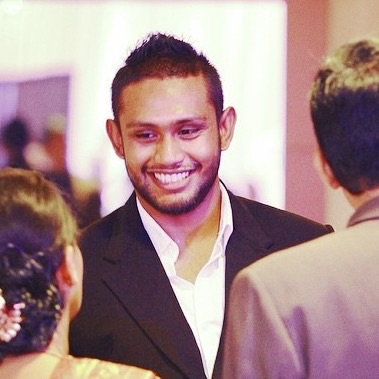
- Born: Chethiya Prabhath Bandara Wadugodapitiya; 2 August 1991 (age 35)
- Height: 1.89 m (6 ft 2 in)
- Weight: 85 kg (13 st 5 lb)
- School: Kingswood College
- University: University of London, Royal Institute Colombo, University of California, Los Angeles (school of law)
- Notable relative(s): Ananda Wadugodapitiya (father); Ajantha Godaliyadda Wadugodapitiya (mother); Anupiya Wadugodapitiya (brother)

Rugby union career
- Position(s): Flanker, Number eight, Second Row
Senior career
Years	Team	Apps	(Points)
2010–12	Air Force SC	47	(24)
2013–14	Police SC	12	(42)
2017-2021	CH & FC SC		
- Correct as of 21 March 2015
International career
Years	Team	Apps	(Points)
2010	Sri Lanka	4	(10)
2013	United States	12	(0)
- Correct as of 21 March 2015

Chethiya Wadugodapitiya (born 2 August 1991) is a Sri Lankan international rugby union player whose favoured position is at Flanker.

Wadugodapitiya grew up in Kandy, his father is a businessman (who also played for Army SC) and his mother was a lawyer. The oldest of two boys Wadugodapitiya received his primary and secondary education at Kingswood College, where he excelled at sports from a young age. At thirteen Wadugodapitiya lost his mother when the family was caught in the 2004 Indian Ocean tsunami.

Wadugodapitiya played for Kingswood College 2007 - 2010, competing in the Singer schools rugby league. In 2010 he was selected to play in the Sri Lanka U19 national team competing at Asian Youth Rugby Championships in Bangkok, Thailand. In 2010 he was selected to play for the Sri Lanka national rugby union team, competing between 2010 and 2014. In 2011 and 2012 Wadugodapitiya played in the Dialog Rugby League League for Air Force SC before switching to Police SC in 2013.
