= Ransilu Jayathilake =

Sri Lankan weightlifter

Personal information
- Full name: Kavinda Ransilu Jayathilake
- Born: 15 December 1987 (age 38) Kandy
- Education: Kingswood College, Kandy

Sport
- Sport: Powerlifting
Medal record
Men's Powerlifting
Representing Sri Lanka
Commonwealth Championships
Silver medal – second place	2019 Canada	Single-Open
Silver medal – second place	2019 Canada	Raw-Open
Gold medal – first place	2015 Canada BC	Single-Open
Silver medal – second place	2015 Canada BC	Raw-Open
World Classic Powerlifting Championships
	2019 Sweden	Raw-Open
		2018 Canada
		2017 Belarus
Asian Pacific Championship
Silver medal – second place	2019 Australia	Raw-Open
Gold medal – first place	2019 Australia	Single-Open
World Open Championships
		2016 USA
Asian Powerlifting Championships
Bronze medal – third place	2016 India	Single-Open
World Sub-Juniors Powerlifting Championships
Silver medal – second place	2003 India	Single-Sub-Jr

Ransilu Jayathilake (born 15 December 1987) is a Sri Lankan powerlifter. He has won gold medals at Commonwealth, Asia Pacific and Asian competitions including winning the Asian championship 5 times in a row.

Jayathilake's personal best deadlift of 322.5 kg (711 lb) raw, performed in 2023 Asia-Pacific Powerlifting Championships in China, is the South Asian raw deadlift record as well as the national deadlift record irrespective of the sport.

== See also ==
- Weightlifting at the 2006 Asian Games – Men's 94 kg
- List of national deadlift record holders
