= 2024 Asia Rugby Championship =

Rugby union competition for men's national teams

- Date: 1 June – 22 June
- Countries: Hong Kong; Malaysia; South Korea; United Arab Emirates

Final positions
- Champions: Hong Kong
- Relegated: Malaysia

Tournament statistics
- Matches played: 6
- Tries scored: 57 (9.5 per match)
- Top scorer(s): (Hong Kong) Paul Altier (54)
- Most tries: (Hong Kong) Paul Altier (4)
- Website: www.asiarugby.com

The 2024 Asia Rugby Championship is the eighth annual rugby union series for the top-level Asia Rugby nations. Hong Kong, South Korea, Malaysia and the United Arab Emirates shall compete in the 2024 series. Other Asian nations played in the lower division tournaments.

The format of the series is a single round-robin where the four teams play each other once. The team finishing on top of the standings at the end of the series is declared the winner. The team finishing at the bottom of the standing are relegated to the 2025 Asia Rugby Division 1. The competition will begin on 1 June 2024 and will conclude on 22 June 2024.

Hong Kong entered the competition as reigning champions, having won the competition for the fourth time in 2023. The United Arab Emirates were promoted from the 2023 Asia Rugby Division 1.

== Teams ==
The teams involved,

| Team | Stadia | | | Coach | Captain | World Rugby Ranking | |
| Team | Home stadium | Capacity | Location | Coach | Captain | Start | End |
|---|---|---|---|---|---|---|---|
| Hong Kong | Hong Kong Football Club Stadium | 2,750 | Hong Kong | (New Zealand) Andrew Douglas | Joshua Hrstich | 24th | 24th |
| South Korea | Incheon Namdong Asiad Rugby Field | 4,968 | Incheon | (South Korea) Lee Myung Geun | Lee Jin Kyu | 30th | 33rd |
| Malaysia | UPM Stadium | 3,000 | Serdang | (Malaysia) Farid Syazwan Abu Bakar | Mohamad Nasharuddin Isamil | 50th | 56th |
| United Arab Emirates | The Sevens Stadium | 15,000 | Dubai | (South Africa) Jacques Benade | Matthew Mills | 60th | 52nd |

== Squads ==
Malaysia squad
| Name | Position | Caps | Club |
|---|---|---|---|
| Azam Fakhrullah Bin Abd Razak | Loosehead Prop | | (Malaysia) Terengganu |
| Muhammad Abrar Bin Zanuddin | Loosehead Prop | | |
| Amirul Mukminin Bin Amizan | Hooker | | (Malaysia) New Perlis |
| Nabil Ikhwan | Hooker | | (Malaysia) Putrajaya |
| Mohd Nurazman Ramli | Hooker | | (Malaysia) PDRM |
| Mohammad Azri Mohd Kamal Rosnan | Tighthead Prop | | (Malaysia) MSS Kelantan |
| Amierul Harith | Tighthead Prop | | (Malaysia) Putrajaya |
| Aiman Hakeem | Tighthead Prop | | (Malaysia) Johor |
| Harith El Iskander Shah Mohd Shukri | Lock | | (Malaysia) Putrajaya |
| Suhalkal Suhaimi | Lock | | (Malaysia) NS Wanderers RC |
| Muhammad Sameer Muhammad Sani Surinder | Lock | | (Malaysia) Terengganu |
| Mohad Shobrey Bin Amok | Lock | | (Malaysia) Sabah |
| Mohamad Syahmi Afiq Bin Edan | Lock | | (Malaysia) PDRM |
| Syarif Nurhidayat Muzhaimey | Flanker | | (Malaysia) Putrajaya |
| Samuel Rentap Meran | Flanker | | (Malaysia) Terengganu |
| Shah Izwan | Flanker | | (Malaysia) MSS Kelantan |
| Amin Jamaluddin | Number 8 | | (Malaysia) New Perlis |
| Amirul Aiman Ihsan Abas | Number 8 | | (Malaysia) Sabah |
| Razali Ramlan | Scrumhalf | | (Malaysia) Putrajaya |
| Mohamad Nasharuddin Isamil | Scrumhalf | | (Malaysia) Terengganu |
| Lee James Chapman | Flyhalf | | (Malaysia) PDRM |
| Mohd Fairuz Ab Rahman | Flyhalf | | (Malaysia) Sabah |
| Nareen Fitri | Flyhalf | | (Malaysia) Terengganu |
| Muhammad Zharif Affandi Mohamed Zahib | Center | | (Malaysia) Terengganu |
| Hakim Abu Hassan | Center | | (Malaysia) Putrajaya |
| Zulkiflee Bin Azmi | Center | | (Malaysia) PDRM |
| Kamal Hamidi | Center | | Malaysia Sevens |
| Azwan Zuwairi | Center | | (Malaysia) PDRM |
| Mohd Daim Bin Zainudin | Outside Back | | (Malaysia) New Perlis |
| Adam Ariff | Outside Back | | (Malaysia) MSS Kelantan |
| Ahmad Zulhilmi Azizad | Outside Back | | (Malaysia) Johor |
| Harith lqbal | Outside Back | | (Malaysia) Terengganu |
| Harry Preston | Outside Back | | (England) Leicester Lions RFC |
| Anwarul Hafiz Bin Ahmad | Outside Back | | (Malaysia) PDRM |

South Korean Squad
| Name | Position | Caps | Club |
|---|---|---|---|
| Yang Keun Seob | Loosehead Prop | 0 | (South Korea) Hyundai Glovis |
| Shin Ji Min | Loosehead Prop | 0 | (South Korea) OK Financial Group Okman |
| Kim Tae Woo | Loosehead Prop | 0 | (South Korea) Korea Armed Forces Athletic Corps |
| Choi Ho Young | Hooker | 4 | (South Korea) Korea Armed Forces Athletic Corps |
| Lee Seung Eun | Hooker | 0 | (South Korea) Hyundai Glovis |
| Park Gun Woo | Hooker | 0 | (South Korea) OK Financial Group Okman |
| Park Ye Chan | Tighthead Prop | 3 | (South Korea) Hyundai Glovis |
| Won Jung Ho | Tighthead Prop | 2 | (South Korea) Hyundai Glovis |
| Seo Tae Pung | Tighthead Prop | 0 | (South Korea) Korea Armed Forces Athletic Corps |
| Kim Sang Jin | Lock | 5 | (South Korea) OK Financial Group Okman |
| Park Joon Beom | Lock | 2 | (South Korea) Hyundai Glovis |
| Lee Hyeon Je | Lock | 0 | (South Korea) Hyundai Glovis |
| Seo Jong Soo | Lock | 0 | (South Korea) Korea Armed Forces Athletic Corps |
| Yoo Jae Hoon | Back row | 9 | (South Korea) OK Financial Group Okman |
| Kim Yo Han | Back row | 4 | (South Korea) Hyundai Glovis |
| Hwang Jeong Wook | Back row | 1 | (South Korea) Hyundai Glovis |
| Kim Chan Ju | Back row | 0 | (South Korea) Hyundai Glovis |
| Yoo Gi Jung | Back row | 0 | (South Korea) OK Financial Group Okman |
| Heo Jae Jun | Scrumhalf | 0 | (South Korea) Hyundai Glovis |
| Kang Min Jun | Scrumhalf | 0 | (South Korea) OK Financial Group Okman |
| Jung Bu Hyon | Flyhalf | 1 | (South Korea) Hyundai Glovis |
| Ko Seung Jae | Flyhalf | 0 | (South Korea) OK Financial Group Okman |
| Mun Jeong Ho | Center | 6 | (South Korea) Hyundai Glovis |
| Lee Jin Kyu | Center | 0 | (South Korea) Hyundai Glovis |
| Lee Yong Un | Center | 0 | (South Korea) OK Financial Group Okman |
| Jeong Yeon Sik | Outside Back | 15 | (South Korea) Hyundai Glovis |
| Shin Min Su | Outside Back | 1 | (South Korea) Hyundai Glovis |
| Kim Chan Deul | Outside Back | 0 | (South Korea) OK Financial Group Okman |
| Baek Jong Eun | Outside Back | 1 | (South Korea) Hyundai Glovis |

United Arab Emirates Squad
| Name | Position | Caps | Club |
|---|---|---|---|
| Lukas Waddington | Prop | 4 | (United Arab Emirates) Dubai Exiles RFC |
| Pieter Killian | Prop | 2 | (United Arab Emirates) Dubai Exiles RFC |
| Riaan Barnard | Prop | 2 | (United Arab Emirates) Barrelhouse RC |
| Sunia Laladidi | Prop | 0 | (United Arab Emirates) Abu Dhabi Harlequins |
| Moeneeb Galant | Hooker | 2 | (United Arab Emirates) Dubai Exiles RFC |
| David Gairn | Hooker | 2 | (United Arab Emirates) Dubai Exiles RFC |
| Esekaia Dranibota | Lock | 2 | (United Arab Emirates) Dubai Tigers RFC |
| Jonathan Harris | Lock | 2 | (United Arab Emirates) Jebel Ali Dragons |
| Jaen Botes | Back row | 10 | (United Arab Emirates) Dubai Exiles RFC |
| Matthew Mills (c) | Back row | 4 | (United Arab Emirates) Dubai Exiles RFC |
| Epeli Davetawalu | Back row | 2 | (United Arab Emirates) Dubai Exiles RFC |
| Marcus Guerin | Back row | 0 | (United Arab Emirates) Dubai Tigers RFC |
| Ian Surtees | Back row | 0 | (United Arab Emirates) Jebel Ali Dragons |
| Chris McKee | Back row | 0 | (United Arab Emirates) Abu Dhabi Harlequins |
| Carel Thomas | Scrumhalf | 2 | (United Arab Emirates) Dubai Exiles RFC |
| Andrew Semple | Scrumhalf | 0 | (United Arab Emirates) Abu Dhabi Harlequins |
| Jamie Gavin | Flyhalf | 0 | (United Arab Emirates) Jebel Ali Dragons |
| Handre Snetler | Flyhalf | 0 | (United Arab Emirates) Dubai Exiles RFC |
| Sakiusa Naisau | Center | 4 | (United Arab Emirates) Dubai Tigers RFC |
| Rory Arthur | Center | 0 | (United Arab Emirates) Dubai Exiles RFC |
| Liam Caldwell | Outside Back | 0 | (United Arab Emirates) Dubai Tigers RFC |
| Justin Walsh | Outside Back | 0 | (United Arab Emirates) Dubai Exiles RFC |
| Emosi Vecenaua | Outside Back | 0 | (United Arab Emirates) Dubai Sharks RFC |
| Matt Richards | Outside Back | 0 | (United Arab Emirates) Jebel Ali Dragons |
| Connor Kennedy | Outside Back | 0 | (United Arab Emirates) Dubai Exiles RFC |

== Preparation ==
=== Hong Kong China ===
Hong Kong China spent the 22–28 April in Canberra at the Australian Institute of Sport (AIS) in preparation for the 2024 Asia Rugby Championship and to help create a professional environment for the group. They ended the tour with a match against the ACT Brumbies Runners as a curtain raiser for the 2024 Super Rugby matchup between ACT Brumbies and Hurricanes at Canberra Stadium in Canberra.

27 April 2024
11:55 AEST (UTC+10)

| ACT Brumbies Runners | 65–0 | Hong Kong China XV |
| | Report |

GIO Stadium, Canberra

Team details

| FB | 15 | (Australia) Nate Carroll |
| RW | 14 | (Australia) Matias Jensen |
| OC | 13 | (Australia) Hudson Creighton |
| IC | 12 | (New Zealand) Austin Anderson |
| LW | 11 | (Australia) Ben O’Donnell |
| FH | 10 | (Australia) Declan Meredith |
| SH | 9 | (Australia) Klayton Thorn |
| N8 | 8 | (Australia) Baden Godfrey |
| OF | 7 | (Australia) Luke Reimer |
| BF | 6 | (Australia) Ed Kennedy |
| RL | 5 | (Australia) Nick Frost |
| LL | 4 | (Australia) Lachlan Shaw |
| TP | 3 | (Australia) Rhys van Nek |
| HK | 2 | (Australia) Liam Bowron |
| LP | 1 | (Australia) Harry Vella |
Replacements:
| | 16 | (Australia) Davea Teoteo |
| | 17 | (Australia) Sam Sahyoun |
| | 18 | (New Zealand) Sila Titiuti |
| | 19 | (Australia) Will Sankey |
| | 20 | (Australia) Deveraux Tapelu |
| | 21 | (Australia) Alex Smit |
| | 22 | (Australia) Wally Wentzel |
| | 23 | (Australia) Clay Uyen |
| | 24 | (Australia) Sam McLachlan |
| | 25 | (Australia) Silas Pilot |
| | 26 | (Australia) Alex Kerr |
Coach:
(Australia) Dan Hooper

| FB | 15 | Dylan White |
| RW | 14 | Alex Moses |
| OC | 13 | Jack Morris |
| IC | 12 | Tom Hill |
| LW | 11 | Will Panday |
| FH | 10 | Matteo Avitabile |
| SH | 9 | Pat Joe Laidler |
| N8 | 8 | Joshua Hrstich (c) |
| OF | 7 | Hugh McCormick-Houston |
| BF | 6 | Tyler McNutt |
| RL | 5 | Jamie Pincott |
| LL | 4 | Jonnathan Kenny |
| TP | 3 | Zac Cinnamond |
| HK | 2 | John McCormick-Houston |
| LP | 1 | James Holmes |
Replacements:
| PR | 16 | Rory Cinnamond |
| PR | 17 | Sunia Fameitau |
| PR | 18 | Faizal Solomone Penesa |
| LK | 19 | Dana Fourie |
| BR | 20 | Dean Rossouw |
| FH | 21 | Nathan De Thierry |
| FB | 22 | Dylan McCann |
| CE | 23 | Benjamin Axten-Burrett |
| BR | 24 | Luke Van der Smit |
| PR | 25 | Ben Higgins |
| HK | 26 | Jude Harding |
| WG | 27 | Murray Brechin |
| CE | 28 | Jack Abbott |
| FB | 29 | Shiven Dukhande |
Coach:
(New Zealand) Andrew Douglas

=== Malaysia ===
Malaysia played a practice match against local side Tueto Wear Selection Team, and played a cross border friendly match against Singapore on 11 May. The game was uncapped.

11 May 2024
14:00

| Malaysia XV | 46 – 7 | Singapore XV |

Johor Rugby Stadium, Johor

== Standings ==
2024 Asia Rugby Championship Champions
Relegation to 2025 Asia Rugby Division 1

| Pos. | Team | Matches | | | | Points | | | Bonus points | Total points |
| Pos. | Team | Played | Won | Lost | Drawn | For | Against | Diff. | Bonus points | Total points |
|---|---|---|---|---|---|---|---|---|---|---|
| 1 | Hong Kong | 3 | 3 | 0 | 0 | 189 | 18 | +171 | 3 | 15 |
| 2 | United Arab Emirates | 3 | 2 | 1 | 0 | 103 | 103 | 0 | 2 | 10 |
| 3 | South Korea | 3 | 1 | 2 | 0 | 94 | 108 | -14 | 3 | 7 |
| 4 | Malaysia | 3 | 0 | 3 | 0 | 30 | 187 | -157 | 0 | 0 |
Points were awarded to the teams as follows: Win — 4 points; Draw — 2 points; 4 or more tries — 1 point; Loss within 7 points — 1 point; Loss greater than 7 points — 0 points

== Fixtures ==
=== Week 1 ===
1 June 2024
15:30 HKT (UTC+8)

| Hong Kong | 52 – 5 | United Arab Emirates |
| Try: McCormick-Houston 16' c Laidler (2) 19' c, 24' m Hill (2) 34' c, 45' c Altier 48' c Post 75' c Higson Smith 78' m Con: Hill (6/8) 18', 20', 35', 46', 50', 77'; Cards: McCormick-Houston (yellow card) 51' to 61' | Report | Try: Vecenaua 6' m |

Hong Kong Football Club Stadium, Hong Kong China
Attendance: 1,000
Referee: (Japan) Katsuki Furuse

| FB | 15 | Paul Altier |
| RW | 14 | Sebastian Brien |
| OC | 13 | Benjamin Axten-Burrett |
| IC | 12 | Tom Hill |
| LW | 11 | Charles Higson-Smith |
| FH | 10 | Matteo Avitabile |
| SH | 9 | Pat Joe Laidler |
| N8 | 8 | Luke van der Smit |
| OF | 7 | James Sawyer |
| BF | 6 | Joshua Hrstich (c) |
| RL | 5 | Kyle Sullivan |
| LL | 4 | Jamie Pincott |
| TP | 3 | Zac Cinnamond |
| HK | 2 | John McCormick-Houston |
| LP | 1 | Rory Cinnamond |
Replacements:
| HK | 16 | Alexander Post |
| LP | 17 | Chukwudi Edison |
| TP | 18 | Faizal Solomona Penesa |
| LK | 19 | Callum McCullough |
| BR | 20 | Tyler McNutt |
| SH | 21 | Camill Cheung |
| CE | 22 | Jack Neville |
| OB | 23 | Harry Sayers |
Coach:
(New Zealand) Andrew Douglas

| FB | 15 | Matt Richards |
| RW | 14 | Emosi Vecenaua |
| OC | 13 | Rory Arthur |
| IC | 12 | Justin Walsh |
| LW | 11 | Sakiusa Naisau |
| FH | 10 | Jamie Gavin |
| SH | 9 | Andrew Semple |
| N8 | 8 | Jaen Botes |
| OF | 7 | Matthew Mills (c) |
| BF | 6 | Epeli Davetawalu |
| RL | 5 | Marcus Guerin |
| LL | 4 | Esekaia Dranibota |
| TP | 3 | Riaan Barnard |
| HK | 2 | David Gairn |
| LP | 1 | Pieter Killian |
Replacements:
| LP | 16 | Sunia Laladidi |
| TP | 17 | Lukas Waddington |
| HK | 18 | Moeneeb Galant |
| BR | 19 | Chris McKee |
| BR | 20 | Liam Caldwell |
| OB | 21 | Connor Kennedy |
| SH | 22 | Carel Thomas |
| LK | 23 | Jonathan Harris |
Coach:
(South Africa) Jacques Benade

2 June 2024
14:00 KST (UTC+9)

| South Korea | 55 – 5 | Malaysia |
| Try: Jin Kyu (2) 7' m, 71' c Hyeon Je 14 c Jeong Wook (3) 24' c, 30' m, 39' c Yong Un 26' c Chan Ju 45'; Yeon Sik 66' m Con: Seung Jae (5/9) 15', 25', 27', 40', 72' | Report | Try: Amok 49' m |

Incheon Namdong Asiad Rugby Field, South Korea
Attendance: 1,000
Referee: (United Arab Emirates) Jaco De Wit

| FB | 15 | Baek Jong Eun |
| RW | 14 | Jeong Yeon Sik |
| OC | 13 | Mun Jeong Ho |
| IC | 12 | Lee Jin Kyu (c) |
| LW | 11 | Lee Yong Un |
| FH | 10 | Jung Bu Hyon |
| SH | 9 | Kang Min Jun |
| N8 | 8 | Hwang Jeong Wook |
| OF | 7 | Kim Chan Ju |
| BF | 6 | Kim Yo Han |
| RL | 5 | Lee Hyeon Je |
| LL | 4 | Seo Jong Soo |
| TP | 3 | Won Jung Ho |
| HK | 2 | Choi Ho Young |
| LP | 1 | Kim Tae Woo |
Replacements:
| LH | 16 | Shin Ji Min |
| HK | 17 | Park Gun Woo |
| TH | 18 | Seo Tae Pung |
| LK | 19 | Kim Sang Jin |
| BR | 20 | Yoo Jae Hoon |
| SH | 21 | Heo Jae Jun |
| FB | 22 | Kim Chan Deul |
| FH | 23 | Ko Seung Jae |
Coach:
(South Korea) Lee Myung Geun

| FB | 15 | Anwarul Hafiz Bin Ahmad |
| RW | 14 | Ahmad Zulhilmi Azizad |
| OC | 13 | Zulkiflee Bin Azmi |
| IC | 12 | Muhammad Zharif Affandi Mohamed Zahib |
| LW | 11 | Mohd Daim Bin Zainudin |
| FH | 10 | Lee James Chapman |
| SH | 9 | Razali Ramlan |
| N8 | 8 | Amirul Aiman Ihsan Abas |
| OF | 7 | Samuel Rentap Meran |
| BF | 6 | Syarif Nurhidayat Muzhaimey (c) |
| RL | 5 | Harith El Iskander Shah Mohd Shukri |
| LL | 4 | Muhammad Sameer Muhammad Sani Surinder |
| TP | 3 | Mohamad Syahmi Afiq Bin Edan |
| HK | 2 | Amirul Mukminin Bin Amizan |
| LP | 1 | Mohammad Azri Mohd Kamal Rosnan |
Replacements:
| | 16 | Mohd Nurazman Ramli |
| | 17 | Azam Fakhrullah Bin Abd Razak |
| | 18 | Muhammad Abrar Bin Zanuddin |
| | 19 | Mohad Shobrey Bin Amok |
| | 20 | Suhalkal Suhaimi |
| | 21 | Mohamad Nasharuddin Isamil |
| | 22 | Mohd Fairuz Ab Rahman |
| | 23 | Ahmad Azhad Rifqi Redzuan |
Coach:
(Malaysia) Farid Syazwan Abu Bakar

=== Week 2 ===
8 June 2024
14:00 MST (UTC+8)

| Malaysia | 6 – 70 | Hong Kong |
| Pen: Chapman 10', 56'; Cards: Amizan (yellow card) 17' to 27' | Report | Try: Post 7' c Penalty try 17'; Altier (2) 20' c, 33' c McNutt 21' c Hrstich (2) 36' c, 57' c Penesa 44' c Scott 67' c Pincott 69' c Con: Altier (7/7) 8', 19', 22', 35', 36', 46', 59'; Avitabile (2/2) 68' 70'; Cards: Sullivan (yellow card) 29' to 39' |

UPM Stadium, Serdang
Attendance: 1,000
Referee: (Singapore) Just Wang

| FB | 15 | Anwarul Hafiz Bin Ahmad |
| RW | 14 | Muhammad Harith Iqbal Bin Bin Muhammad Ahnar |
| OC | 13 | Muhammad Azwan Zuwairi Bin Mat Zizi |
| IC | 12 | Muhammad Hakim Bin Abu Hassan |
| LW | 11 | Muhammad Kamal Hamidi Bin Mohd Raihan |
| FH | 10 | Lee James Chapman |
| SH | 9 | Mohamad Nasharuddin Isamil (c) |
| N8 | 8 | Amirul Aiman Ihsan Abas |
| OF | 7 | Suhalkal Suhaimi |
| BF | 6 | Syarif Nurhidayat Muzhaimey |
| RL | 5 | Mohad Shobrey Bin Amok |
| LL | 4 | Muhammad Sameer Muhammad Sani Surinder |
| TP | 3 | Mohamad Syahmi Afiq Bin Edan |
| HK | 2 | Amirul Mukminin Bin Amizan |
| LP | 1 | Mohammad Azri Mohd Kamal Rosnan |
Replacements:
| | 16 | Mohd Nurazman Ramli |
| | 17 | Azam Fakhrullah Bin Abd Razak |
| | 18 | Muhammad Abrar Bin Zanuddin |
| | 19 | Harith El Iskander Shah Mohd Shukri |
| | 20 | Mohamad Amin Jamaluddin |
| | 21 | Razali Ramlan |
| | 22 | Mohammad Nzareen Fitri Bin Nasrudin |
| | 23 | Zulkiflee Bin Azmi |
Coach:
(Malaysia) Farid Syazwan Abu Bakar

| FB | 15 | Matteo Avitabile |
| RW | 14 | Paul Altier |
| OC | 13 | Jack Neville |
| IC | 12 | Benjamin Axten-Burrett |
| LW | 11 | Sebastian Brien |
| FH | 10 | Glyn Hughes |
| SH | 9 | Pat Joe Laidler |
| N8 | 8 | Joshua Hrstich (c) |
| OF | 7 | Pierce MacKinlay-West |
| BF | 6 | Tyler McNutt |
| RL | 5 | Callum McCullough |
| LL | 4 | Kyle Sullivan |
| TP | 3 | Faizal Solomona Penesa |
| HK | 2 | Alexander Post |
| LP | 1 | Rory Cinnamond |
Replacements:
| HK | 16 | Calum Scott |
| LP | 17 | Chukwudi Edison |
| TH | 18 | Zac Cinnamond |
| LK | 19 | Jamie Pincott |
| SH | 21 | Camill Cheung |
| CE | 22 | Murray Brechin |
| CE | 23 | Tom Hill |
Coach:
(New Zealand) Andrew Douglas

9 June 2024
19:30 GST (UTC+04)

| United Arab Emirates | 36 – 32 | South Korea |
| Try: Semple 10' c Gelant 45' m Gavin 50' m Davetawalu 64' c Con: Gavin (2/4) 11', 65'; Pen: Gavin 3', 34', 60'; Drop: Gavin 69' | Report | Try: Young Un 7' c Jong Eun 18' m Jin Kyu 28' m Jeong Ho 36' c Chan Deul 55' m Con: Seung Jae (2/5) 8', 37'; Pen: Seung Jae 5' |

The Sevens Stadium, Dubai
Attendance: 500
Referee: (Hong Kong) Matthew Rodden

| FB | 15 | Connor Kennedy |
| RW | 14 | Sakiusa Naisau |
| OC | 13 | George Hipperson |
| IC | 12 | Liam Caldwell |
| LW | 11 | Tobias Oakeley |
| FH | 10 | Jamie Gavin |
| SH | 9 | Andrew Semple |
| N8 | 8 | Jaen Botes |
| OF | 7 | Matthew Mills (c) |
| BF | 6 | Epeli Davetawalu |
| RL | 5 | Marcus Guerin |
| LL | 4 | Esekaia Dranibota |
| TP | 3 | Riaan Barnard |
| HK | 2 | David Gairn |
| LP | 1 | Pieter Killian |
Replacements:
| LH | 17 | Lukas Waddington |
| HK | 18 | Moeneeb Galant |
| N8 | 19 | Chris McKee |
| SH | 22 | Carel Thomas |
| FH | 24 | Handre Snetler |
| FB | 27 | Matt Richards |
| | 29 | Diarmuid Carr |
| LK | 31 | Jonathan Harris |
Coach:
(South Africa) Jacques Benade

| FB | 15 | Baek Jong Eun |
| RW | 14 | Jeong Yeon Sik |
| OC | 13 | Mun Jeong Ho |
| IC | 12 | Lee Jin Kyu (c) |
| LW | 11 | Lee Yong Un |
| FH | 10 | Ko Seung Jae |
| SH | 9 | Kang Min Jun |
| N8 | 8 | Yoo Jae Hoon |
| OF | 7 | Kim Chan Ju |
| BF | 6 | Kim Yo Han |
| RL | 5 | Seo Jong Soo |
| LL | 4 | Lee Hyeon Je |
| TP | 3 | Won Jung Ho |
| HK | 2 | Choi Ho Young |
| LP | 1 | Kim Tae Woo |
Replacements:
| HK | 16 | Lee Seung Eun |
| LH | 17 | Shin Ji Min |
| TH | 18 | Seo Tae Pung |
| LK | 19 | Kim Sang Jin |
| BR | 20 | Hwang Jeong Wook |
| SH | 21 | Heo Jae Jun |
| FH | 22 | Kim Chan Deul |
| OB | 23 | Kim Hyun Jin |
Coach:
(South Korea) Lee Myung Geun

=== Week 3 ===
21 June 2024
19:30 GST (UTC+04)

| United Arab Emirates | 62 – 19 | Malaysia |
| Try: Oakeley (2) 2' m, 26' c Barnard 8' c McKee 13' c Vecenaua (2) 33' c, 50' m Naisau (2) 40' c, 80' m Walsh 76' c Con: Gavin (6/9) 9', 15', 27', 34', 40', 77'; Cards: Caldwell (yellow card) 16' to 26' | Report | Try: Muzhaimey 17' c Isamil 22' m Preston 46' c Con: Chapman (2/3) 18', 47'; Cards: Amizan (yellow card) 40' to 50' |

The Sevens Stadium, Dubai
Attendance: 1,000
Referee: (Hong Kong) Morgan White

| FB | 15 | Matt Richards |
| RW | 14 | Sakiusa Naisau |
| OC | 13 | George Hipperson |
| IC | 12 | Liam Caldwell |
| LW | 11 | Tobias Oakeley |
| FH | 10 | Jamie Gavin |
| SH | 9 | Andrew Semple |
| N8 | 8 | Chris McKee |
| OF | 7 | Matthew Mills (c) |
| BF | 6 | Epeli Davetawalu |
| RL | 5 | Marcus Guerin |
| LL | 4 | Jaen Botes |
| TP | 3 | Riaan Barnard |
| HK | 2 | Moeneeb Galant |
| LP | 1 | Pieter Killian |
Replacements:
| HK | 16 | David Gairn |
| PR | 17 | Lukas Waddington |
| LK | 18 | Jonathan Harris |
| BR | 19 | Emosi Vecenaua |
| OB | 20 | Justin Walsh |
| FB | 21 | Connor Kennedy |
| | 22 | Gareth Newman |
| PR | 23 | Sunia Laladidi |
Coach:
(South Africa) Jacques Benade

| FB | 15 | Anwarul Hafiz Bin Ahmad |
| RW | 14 | Ahmad Zulhilmi Azizad |
| OC | 13 | Muhammad Azwan Zuwairi Bin Mat Zizi |
| IC | 12 | Muhammad Hakim Bin Abu Hassan |
| LW | 11 | Zulkiflee Bin Azmi |
| FH | 10 | Lee James Chapman |
| SH | 9 | Mohamad Nasharuddin Isamil (c) |
| N8 | 8 | Mohamad Amin Jamaluddin |
| OF | 7 | Samuel Rentap Meran |
| BF | 6 | Syarif Nurhidayat Muzhaimey |
| RL | 5 | Mohad Shobrey Bin Amok |
| LL | 4 | Muhammad Sameer Muhammad Sani Surinder |
| TP | 3 | Muhammad Abrar Bin Zanuddin |
| HK | 2 | Amirul Mukminin Bin Amizan |
| LP | 1 | Mohammad Azri Mohd Kamal Rosnan |
Replacements:
| | 16 | Mohd Nurazman Ramli |
| | 17 | Azam Fakhrullah Bin Abd Razak |
| | 18 | Mohamad Syahmi Afiq Bin Edan |
| | 19 | Harith El Iskander Shah Mohd Shukri |
| | 20 | Suhalkal Suhaimi |
| | 21 | Razali Ramlan |
| | 22 | Mohammad Nzareen Fitri Bin Nasrudin |
| | 23 | Henry Christian Preston |
Coach:
(Malaysia) Farid Syazwan Abu Bakar

22 June 2024
16:30 HKT (UTC+8)

| Hong Kong | 67 – 7 | South Korea |
| Try: Hill 3' c van der Smit (3) 23' c, 66' c, 69' c Altier 29' c Sayers 40' c Avitabile 48' m Hrstich 55' c McNutt 79' c Con: Altier (7/8) 4', 24', 31', 40', 56', 67', 70'; McNeish (1/1) 80'; Pen: Altier 11', 15'; Cards: Avitabile (yellow card) 53' to 63' | Report | Try: Penalty Try 53' |

Hong Kong Football Club Stadium, Hong Kong
Attendance: 1,000
Referee: (Japan) Takehito Namikawa

| FB | 15 | Paul Altier |
| RW | 14 | Sebastian Brien |
| OC | 13 | Benjamin Axten-Burrett |
| IC | 12 | Tom Hill |
| LW | 11 | Harry Sayers |
| FH | 10 | Matteo Avitabile |
| SH | 9 | Pat Joe Laidler |
| N8 | 8 | Luke Van Der Smit |
| OF | 7 | James Sawyer |
| BF | 6 | Joshua Hrstich (c) |
| RL | 5 | Callum McCullough |
| LL | 4 | Jamie Pincott |
| TP | 3 | Zac Cinnamond |
| HK | 2 | John McCormick-Houston |
| LP | 1 | Rory Cinnamond |
Replacements:
| HK | 16 | Alexander Post |
| LH | 17 | Chukwudi Edison |
| TH | 18 | Faizal Solomona Penesa |
| LK | 19 | Patrick Jenkinson |
| BR | 20 | Tyler McNutt |
| SH | 21 | Camil Cheung |
| FH | 22 | Gregor McNeish |
| CE | 23 | Jack Abbott |
Coach:
(New Zealand) Andrew Douglas

| FB | 15 | Kim Chan Deul |
| RW | 14 | Jeong Yeon Sik |
| OC | 13 | Mun Jeong Ho |
| IC | 12 | Lee Jin Kyu (c) |
| LW | 11 | Kim Ji Cheol |
| FH | 10 | Jung Bu Hon |
| SH | 9 | Kang Min Jun |
| N8 | 8 | Hwang Jeong Wook |
| OF | 7 | Kim Chan Ju |
| BF | 6 | Kim Yo Han |
| RL | 5 | Kim Sang Jin |
| LL | 4 | Seo Jong Soo |
| TP | 3 | Won Jung Ho |
| HK | 2 | Choi Ho Young |
| LP | 1 | Kim Tae Woo |
Replacements:
| LH | 16 | Shin Ji Min |
| HK | 17 | Lee Seung Eun |
| TH | 18 | Seo Tae Pung |
| LK | 19 | Park Gun Woo |
| BR | 20 | Yoo Gi Jung |
| SH | 21 | Heo Jae Jun |
| CE | 22 | Yoo Jae Hoon |
| FH | 23 | Ko Seung Jae |
Coach:
(South Korea) Lee Myung Geun

== Statistics ==
=== Most points ===
As of 22 June 2024

| Rank | Name | Team | Points |
|---|---|---|---|
| 1 | Paul Altier | Hong Kong | 54 |
| 2 | Jamie Gavin | United Arab Emirates | 33 |
| 3 | Tom Hill | Hong Kong | 27 |
| 4 | Ko Seung Jae | South Korea | 17 |
| 5 | 5 players tied | | 15 |

=== Most tries ===
As of 22 June 2024

| Rank | Name | Team | Tries |
|---|---|---|---|
| 1 | Paul Altier | Hong Kong | 2 |
| 3 | Tom Hill | Hong Kong | 3 |
| 3 | Emosi Vecenaua | United Arab Emirates | 3 |
| 3 | Hwang Jeong Wook | South Korea | 3 |
| 3 | Joshua Hrstich | Hong Kong | 3 |
| 3 | Lee Jin Kyu | South Korea | 3 |
| 3 | Luke van der Smit | Hong Kong | 3 |
