= Jeong Yeon-sik =

South Korea international rugby union player

Jeong Yeon-Sik
- Born: 8 May 1993 (age 33) South Korea
- Height: 1.83 m (6 ft 0 in)
- Weight: 82 kg (12 st 13 lb; 181 lb)
- University: Korea University

Rugby union career
- Position(s): Winger, Fullback
- Current team: Hyundai Glovis
Senior career
Years	Team	Apps	(Points)
2016-2018	KAFAC		
2018-2020	Hino Red Dolphins	8	(10)
2020-	Hyundai Glovis	18	(85)
- Correct as of 7 June 2024
International career
Years	Team	Apps	(Points)
2012-	South Korea	15	(30)
- Correct as of 7 June 2024
National sevens team
Years	Team		Comps
2014-	South Korea		5
Medal record
Men's rugby sevens
Representing South Korea
Asian Games
Silver medal – second place	2022 Hangzhou	Team
Bronze medal – third place	2014 Incheon	Team

Jeong Yeon-sik (born 8 May 1993) is a South Korean rugby union and sevens player who plays for Hyundai Glovis in the Korea Super Rugby League.

== Career ==
=== Club career ===
Jeong spent two seasons in the Korea Rugby League at KAFAC, before joining Japanese Top League side Hino Red Dolphins playing for two seasons. In 2020 he returned to Korea to play for the Hyundai Glovis in the Korea Super Rugby League, winning the tournament in 2023 starting in the final against his former club, KAFAC.

=== International career ===
He is a key member of the South Korea Sevens team, recently competed at the 2020 Summer Olympics and also representing South Korea at the 2022 Rugby World Cup Sevens in South Africa.

In 2023, he won a rugby sevens silver medal at the 2022 Asian Games.

He has also featured for the South Korea rugby union team 13 times. He was named in the South Korea squad for the 2023 Asia Rugby Championship.

== Personal life ==
Jeong appeared on Netflix's Korean reality show, Rugged Rugby: Conquer or Die in December 2024.
