= Kim Ki Min =

South Korea international rugby union player

- Born: 5 August 1997 (age 29) South Korea
- Height: 1.8 m (5 ft 11 in)
- Weight: 88 kg (13 st 12 lb; 194 lb)

Rugby union career
- Position: Fly-half
- Current team: KEPCO
Senior career
Years	Team	Apps	(Points)
2019-2022	KAFAC		
2022-	KEPCO	9	(122)
- Correct as of 3 June 2023
International career
Years	Team	Apps	(Points)
2016	South Korea under-19	2	(15)
2019-	South Korea	5	(25)
- Correct as of 3 June 2023
National sevens team
Years	Team		Comps
2020	South Korea		

Kim Ki Min (born 5 August 1997) is a South Korean rugby union and sevens player who plays for KEPCO in the Korea Super Rugby League.

== Career ==
=== Club career ===
Ki Min spent time at KAFAC during his national service, before joining rival Korea Super Rugby League side KEPCO in 2022. He started in both the 2022 and 2023 Korea Super Rugby League finals, winning both.

=== International career ===
He started in all of South Korea under-19's Asia Rugby Under 19 Division 1 matches. Including starting and scoring two conversions in the final against the United Arab Emirates.

He is a member of the South Korea Sevens team, recently competed at the 2020 Summer Olympics. He has also featured for the South Korea rugby union team 5 times. He was recently named in the South Korea squad for the 2023 Asia Rugby Championship.
