= EcoPro =

South Korean battery company

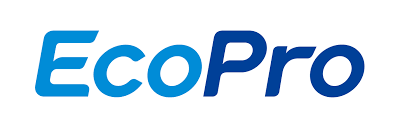
- Native name: 에코프로
- Type: Public
- Traded as: KRX: 086520
- Industry: Rechargeable battery
- Founded: 1998
- Founder: Lee Dong-chae
- Headquarters: 587-40, Gwahang Industrial 2-ro, Ochang-eup, Cheongwon-gu, Cheongju-si, Chungcheongbuk-do, Republic of Korea
- Key people: Ho-Jun Song (CEO)
- Number of employees: 3,570 (2025)
- Website: ecopro.co.kr/eng

EcoPro (Korean: 에코프로) is a battery materials company headquartered in Cheongju, South Korea. It was established in October 1998.

== History ==
In 2015, Sony signed a supply contract for EcoPro's cathode materials. Murata Manufacturing continued the relationship when it purchased Sony's battery division in 2017.

In January 2022, a worker died in a fire at EcoPro BM's Cheongju, South Korea facility. Lee Dong-chae, founder and Chairman of EcoPro Group, resigned as CEO in March after insider trading allegations and the factory fire death.

EcoPro EM, a joint venture between Samsung SDI and EcoPro BM, completed a cathode factory in Pohang, South Korea in October 2022.

In August 2023, Ford announced its partnership with SK On and EcoPro BM to build a battery materials facility in Bécancour, Quebec, Canada for its electric vehicles. The facility's construction has been halted repeatedly for design changes.

The former Chairman Lee was "named an executive adviser on the board" after he was granted a presidential pardon in August 2024 for his prison sentence.

In November 2025, EcoPro completed its cathode materials factory in Debrecen, Hungary.
