= Lee Jin-kyu =

South Korea international rugby union player

- Full name: Lee Jin-kyu
- Born: 4 July 1994 (age 32) South Korea
- Height: 182 cm (6 ft 0 in)
- Weight: 97 kg (214 lb; 15 st 4 lb)

Rugby union career
- Position: Centre
- Current team: Hyundai Glovis
Senior career
Years	Team	Apps	(Points)
2020-	Hyundai Glovis	17	(40)
- Correct as of 4 June 2024
International career
Years	Team	Apps	(Points)
2018–	South Korea	2	(15)
- Correct as of 3 April 2025
National sevens team
Years	Team		Comps
2017–	South Korea		
- Correct as of 3 April 2025
Medal record
Men's rugby sevens
Representing South Korea
Asian Games
Silver medal – second place	2022 Hangzhou	Team

Lee Jin-kyu (born 4 July 1994) is a South Korean rugby sevens player. He competed for South Korea at the 2020 Summer Olympics.

== Rugby career ==
Lee competed for South Korea in the men's sevens tournament at the delayed 2020 Summer Olympics in Tokyo. He also represented South Korea at the 2022 Rugby World Cup Sevens in Cape Town, South Africa.

He was selected in the South Korean fifteens team to compete at the 2024 Asia Rugby Championship. He scored a brace of tries in his sides 55–5 thrashing of Malaysia in their opening match.

He was part of the Hyundai Glovis side that won the 39th Chungmu-gi National Rugby Championship in 2025.
