= 2023 Asia Rugby Championship =

Rugby union competition for men's national teams

- Date: 3 June – 17 June
- Countries: Hong Kong; Malaysia; South Korea

Final positions
- Champions: Hong Kong (4th title)

Tournament statistics
- Matches played: 3
- Tries scored: 22 (7.33 per match)
- Attendance: 4,000 (1,333 per match)
- Top scorer(s): (Hong Kong) Sebastian Brien (Hong Kong) Alexander Post (Hong Kong) Gregor McNeish (25)
- Most tries: (Hong Kong) Sebastian Brien (Hong Kong) Alexander Post (5)
- Website: www.asiarugby.com

The 2023 Asia Rugby Championship is the seventh annual rugby union series for the top-level Asia Rugby nations. Hong Kong, South Korea and Malaysia shall compete in the 2023 series. Other Asian nations played in the lower division tournaments.

The format of the tri-nations series is a single round-robin where the three teams play each other once. The team finishing on top of the standings at the end of the series is declared the winner.

== Teams ==
The teams involved, with their world rankings prior to the 2023 tournament in brackets:

Nation	Home stadium	City
Hong Kong (24)	Hong Kong Football Club Stadium	Hong Kong
South Korea (30)	Incheon Namdong Asiad Rugby Field	Incheon
Malaysia (49)	National Stadium	Kuala Lumpur

== Standings ==
2023 Asia Rugby Championship Champions

Pos	Nation	Games				Points			Bonus points	Total points
Pos	Nation	Played	Won	Lost	Drawn	For	Against	Diff	Bonus points	Total points
1	Hong Kong	2	2	0	0	118	19	99	2	10
2	South Korea	2	1	0	1	37	33	4	1	5
3	Malaysia	2	0	2	0	12	115	-103	0	0
Points were awarded to the teams as follows: Win — 4 points; Draw — 2 points; 4 or more tries — 1 point; Loss within 7 points — 1 point; Loss greater than 7 points — 0 points

== Fixtures ==
=== Week 1 ===
3 June 2023
14:00 MST (UTC+8)

Malaysia	3-27	South Korea
Pen: Fairuz Rahman 18' (1/1); Cards: Daim Zainudin (yellow card) 36' to 46'	Report	Try: Jang Jeong-Min 2' m Kim Ki Min 27' m Lee Geon 34' c S Hwang Jeong Wook 44' c Con: Kim Ki Min 40', 45' (2/4); Pen: Kim Ki Min 37' (1/1)

Siadinha Hamzah Stadium, Kuala Lumpur
Attendance: 1,500
Referee: Matthew Rodden, Hong Kong

FB	15	Anwarul Hafiz Ahmad
RW	14	Daim Zainudin
OC	13	Azwan Zuwairi Zizi
IC	12	Lee Chapman
LW	11	Zharif Affandi Sahid
FH	10	Fairuz Rahman
SH	9	Nasharuddin Ismail (c)
N8	8	Amin Jamaluddin
OF	7	Shah Izwan Nordin
BF	6	Nurhidayat Muzhaimey
RL	5	Sameer Surinder
LL	4	Danial Noor Hamidi
TP	3	Lawrence Petrus
HK	2	Amirul Mukminin Amizan
LP	1	Amirul Abas
Replacements:
HK	16	Wan Azley Wan Omar
PR	17	Azam Fakhrullah Razak
PR	18	Adnin Mukhtar
BR	19	Hafeez Abdul Khalid
BR	20	Syukor Iqbal Raman
SH	21	Razali Ramlan
FB	22	Harith Iqbal Anhar
WG	23	Safiy Said
Coach:
(Malaysia) Farid Syazwan Abu Bakar

FB	15	Chang Yong Heung
RW	14	Jang Jeong Min
OC	13	Heo Dong
IC	12	Kim Yong Hwi
LW	11	Kim Eui Tae
FH	10	Kim Ki Min
SH	9	Lee Geon
N8	8	Hwang Jeong Wook
OF	7	Noh Ok Gi (c)
BF	6	Kim Yo Han
RL	5	Kim Dae Hwan
LL	4	Lee Jin Seok
TP	3	Kang Soon Hyuk
HK	2	Yeo Jae Min
LP	1	Seok Dong Hee
Replacements:
PR	16	Shin Gi Soo
PR	17	Won Jeong Ho
HK	18	Choi Ho Young
LK	19	Shin Da Hyun
BR	20	Park Woo Bin
SH	21	Kim Wan Seok
WG	22	Jeong Yeon-Sik
WG	23	Jang Hyun Goo
Coach:
(South Korea) Lee Myung Geun

=== Week 2 ===
10 June 2023
18:00 HKT (UTC+8)

Hong Kong	88-9	Malaysia
Try: Jamie Lauder 4'; Sebastian Brien 10', 38', 44', 68', 72'; Luke van der Smit 14'; Gregor McNeish 24'; Charles Higson-Smith 26'; Alexander Post 51', 55'; Pierce MacKinlay-West 64'; Bryn Phillips 79'; Con: Gregor McNeish 5', 11', 15', 25', 27', 39', 45'; Nathan De Thierry 69', 73', 80'; Pen: Gregor McNeish 2'; Cards: Paul Altier (yellow card) 22' to 32'; Paul Altier (red card) 63'	Report	Pen: Fairuz Rahman 19', 22'; Nazreen Fitri Nasrudin 77'

Hong Kong Football Club Stadium, Hong Kong
Attendance: 1,500

FB	15	Paul Altier
RW	14	Charles Higson-Smith
OC	13	Nathan De Thierry
IC	12	Tom Hill (c)
LW	11	Sebastian Brien
FH	10	Gregor McNeish
SH	9	Jamie Lauder
N8	8	Luke van der Smit
OF	7	James Sawyer
BF	6	Tsoi Kin San Sam
RL	5	Patrick Jenkinson
LL	4	Callum McCullough
TP	3	Faizal Solomona Penesa
HK	2	Alexander Post
LP	1	Ashton Hyde
Replacements:
	16	Tang Man Chun David
	17	Benjamin Higgins
	18	Keelan Chapman
	19	Jamie Pincott
	20	Pierce MacKinlay-West
	21	Bryn Phillips
	22	Harry Sayers
	23	Will Panday
Coach:
(Wales) Lewis Evans

FB	15	Anwarul Hafiz Ahmad
RW	14	Harith Iqbal Anhar
OC	13	Kamal Hamidi Raihan
IC	12	Zharif Affandi Sahid
LW	11	Adam Ariff Alias
FH	10	Fairuz Rahman (c)
SH	9	Razali Ramlan
N8	8	Amin Jamaluddin
OF	7	Hafeez Abdul Khalid
BF	6	Nurhidayat Muzhaimey
RL	5	Sameer Surinder
LL	4	Danial Noor Hamidi
TP	3	Lawrence Petrus
HK	2	Amirul Mukminin Amizan
LP	1	Azam Fakhrullah Razak
Replacements:
	16	Wan Azley Wan Omar
	17	Azri Kamal Rosnan
	18	Amirul Abas
	19	Syukri Iqbal Raman
	20	Shahmi Shukor
	21	Nasharuddin Ismail
	22	Nazreen Fitri Nasrudin
	23	Safiy Said
Coach:
(Malaysia) Farid Syazwan Abu Bakar

=== Week 3 ===
17 June 2023
18:00 HKT (UTC+8)

Hong Kong	30-10	South Korea
Try: Alexander Post 12', 57', 72'; Tom Hill 38'; Penalty try 77'; Pen: Gregor McNeish 2'; Cards: Patrick Jenkinson (yellow card) 54' to 64'	Report	Try: Chang Yong-heung 66'; Con: Kim Ki Min 67'; Pen: Kim Ki Min 18'; Cards: Chang Yong-heung (yellow card) 11' to 21'; Jeong Yeon-sik (yellow card) 77' to 80'

Hong Kong Football Club Stadium, Hong Kong
Attendance: 1,000

FB	15	Nathan De Thierry
RW	14	Charles Higson-Smith
OC	13	Harry Sayers
IC	12	Tom Hill (c)
LW	11	Sebastian Brien
FH	10	Gregor McNeish
SH	9	Jamie Lauder
N8	8	Luke van der Smit
OF	7	James Sawyer
BF	6	Tsoi Kin San Sam
RL	5	Patrick Jenkinson
LL	4	Callum McCullough
TP	3	Faizal Solomona Penesa
HK	2	Alexander Post
LP	1	Benjamin Higgins
Replacements:
	16	Matt Keay
	17	Zac Cinnamond
	18	Keelan Chapman
	19	Joshua Hrstich
	20	Pierce MacKinlay-West
	21	Bryn Phillips
	22	Dylan White
	23	Will Panday
Coach:
(Wales) Lewis Evans

FB	15	Jeong Yeon Sik
RW	14	Jang Jeong Min
OC	13	Kim Eui Tae
IC	12	Kim Yong Hwi
LW	11	Chang Yong-heung
FH	10	Kim Ki Min
SH	9	Lee Geon
N8	8	Hwang Jeong Wook
OF	7	Noh Ok Gi (c)
BF	6	Kim Yo Han
RL	5	Kim Dae Hwan
LL	4	Lee Jin Seok
TP	3	Kang Soon Hyuck
HK	2	Yeo Jae Min
LH	1	Seok Dong Hee
Replacements:
	16	Choi Ho Young
	17	Shin Gi Soo
	18	Won Jeong Ho
	19	Shin Da Hyun
	20	Noh Myung Soo
	21	Kim Wan Seok
	22	Park Woo Bin
	23	Kim Hyun Jin
Coach:
(South Korea) Lee Myung Geun

== Statistics ==
=== Most points ===
As of 2 April 2024

Rank	Name	Team	Points
1	Alexander Post	Hong Kong	25
1	Gregor McNeish	Hong Kong	25
1	Sebastian Brien	Hong Kong	25
4	Kim Ki Min	South Korea	17
5	Fairuz Rahman	Malaysia	9

=== Most tries ===
As of 2 April 2024

Rank	Name	Team	Tries
1	Alexander Post	Hong Kong	5
1	Sebastian Brien	Hong Kong	5
3	12 players tied		1
