= Hyundai Glovis =

South Korean shipping company

Hyundai Glovis Co., Ltd.

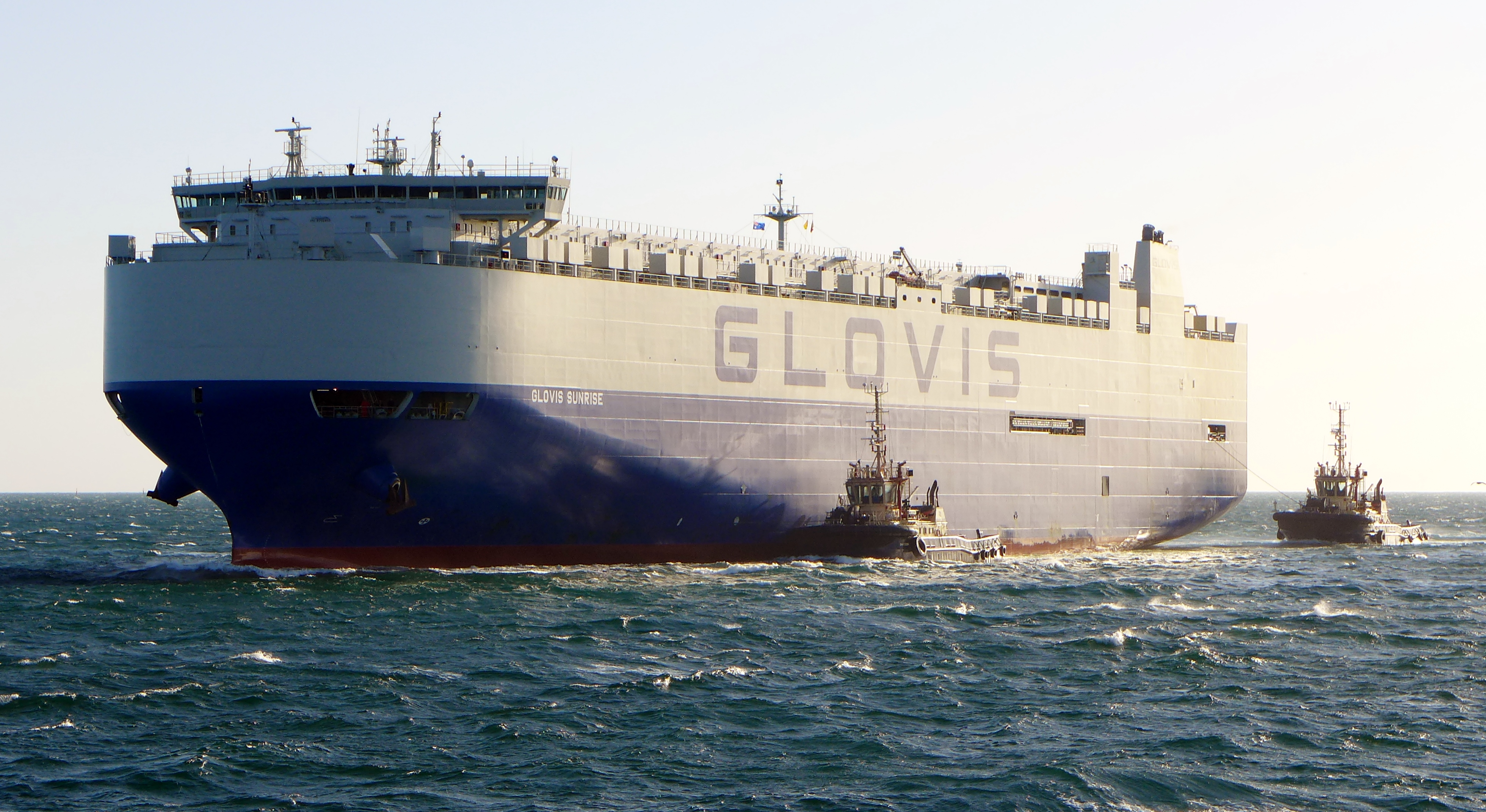
- Native name: 현대글로비스 주식회사
- Formerly: Hankook Logitech Co. Ltd.
- Type: Public
- Traded as: KRX: 086280
- Industry: Logistics
- Founded: 2001
- Headquarters: Seoul, South Korea
- Area served: Worldwide
- Key people: Kim Jung-hoon
- Services: Logistics, car retailing, shipping
- Revenue: KRW16.8 trillion
- Number of employees: 7070
- Parent: Hyundai Motor Group
- Website: www.glovis.net

Hyundai Glovis Co., Ltd. is a logistics company headquartered in Seoul, South Korea and part of the Hyundai Motor Group. Its predecessor company, Hankook Logitech Co. Ltd was formed in February 2001. Hyundai Glovis supplies ocean transportation logistics advice, cargo space, loading/unloading, and packaging services. It changed its name to Hyundai Glovis in June 2003.

== Company ==
The meaning of the name Glovis comes from a portmanteau that combines the two words "Global - Vision".

Hyundai Glovis main business areas in South Korea and internationally are finished vehicles distribution by Roll-on/roll-off ocean shipping, air transportation, inland truck transportation, logistics consulting, storage, and packaging services, as well as supply chain management services. Since 2011, the company has launched an auto parts recycling business, named "OnECO," that mainly consists of distribution of reused and remanufactured auto parts.

The company fleet includes 60 Pure Car and Trucks carriers and 36 bulk carrier ships, deployed on 13 different service routes globally, specialized in the maritime transport and distribution of cargo such as automobiles, trucks, trailers, Mafi roll trailers, heavy construction machinery and further types of rolling freight.

The fleet's size largely increased at the end of 2014, when Hyundai Glovis acquired the majority of STX Pan Ocean tonnage.

A joint venture with Stena Line has been announced and approved by the European Commission in February 2019, for the implementation of a new cooperative intra-European waters short sea service in between the two carriers, for the sea transport of transhipment cargo.

== Facts and accidents ==
On 1 November 2013, the Port of Le Havre welcomed Glovis' maiden port stay in France. MV Glovis Condor called at the port on her way from Gothenburg to Southampton to load and unload cargo, mainly used trucks and military vehicles destined for the Middle East.

On 23 November 2014, Glovis announced the acquisition of the Polish logistics specialist distributor Adampol. The company owns 611 car carrier trailer trucks, manage 600 loads per day, and has a total staff of over 1,300 employees. The main business is storage, pick up from ports and distribution of new cars within Eastern Europe and Russia, with an average of 400,000 cars delivered per year to the final dealers, for brands such as BMW, General Motors, Toyota, and Volkswagen.

On 16 June 2016, the company reaffirmed their intention to not support the Federal government of the United States demands to employ or charter US-flagged vessels. The American Government had suggested on a number of occasions the possibility of reflagging or hiring vessels registered in US, to carry military equipment on Glovis' ballast leg from US to South Korea. However, due to the costs involved, South Korea's Ministry of Oceans and Fisheries politely declined.

On 27 December 2016, MV Glovis Corona (built in 1996, and formerly known as MV Asian Grace) faced a serious near miss, due to severe weather conditions in the European North Sea. The vessel listed approximately 15 degrees, caused by cargo movements in the holds, when cars and high and heavy cargo broke their lashings, dangerously moving within the decks. The accident took place when Glovis Corona was sailing from Hamburg to Gothenborg, having to suddenly stop close to Bremerhaven anchorage. On 30 December, a berth was granted at Bremerhaven, to discharge 1,800 cars, and to further ballast to even the keel. Owing to the situation, the export voyage had to be cancelled and the cargo bookings rolled to another sailing.

On 15 February 2018, MV Glovis Spring ran aground within Paracel Islands waters. The vessel was sailing from Singapore to Hong Kong, with over 3,400 brand new European manufactured cars on board, when it ended up in shallow waters, possibly related to the shifting of landfill materials arranged by the Chinese authorities, and aggravated by extreme low tide sea conditions. Two Chinese companies immediately proposed to assist with the maritime salvage promptly sending divers and tugboats. The operation was finally awarded to a joint venture formed by Messrs Ardent and Guangzhou Salvage. MV Glovis Spring was successfully refloated and made free 4 days after the grounding.

On Monday, 21 May 2018, MV Auto Banner, part of the Glovis tonnage, caught fire while alongside Incheon port, due to overheating of one of the vehicles just loaded on board, destined for Libya. The crew of 28 had to be quickly evacuated from on board, while fire brigades proceeded to successfully extinguish the fire from sea, shore and air. MV Auto Banner was built in 1988 and used to be part of the STX Pan Ocean fleet. The ship was certified in good condition, according to a port state inspection performed in January 2018 in Portland, US.

On 7 September 2019, Greenpeace activists temporary blocked the discharging of Korean SUV vehicles into Bremerhaven port, disrupting for several hours the operations of MV Glovis Sky.

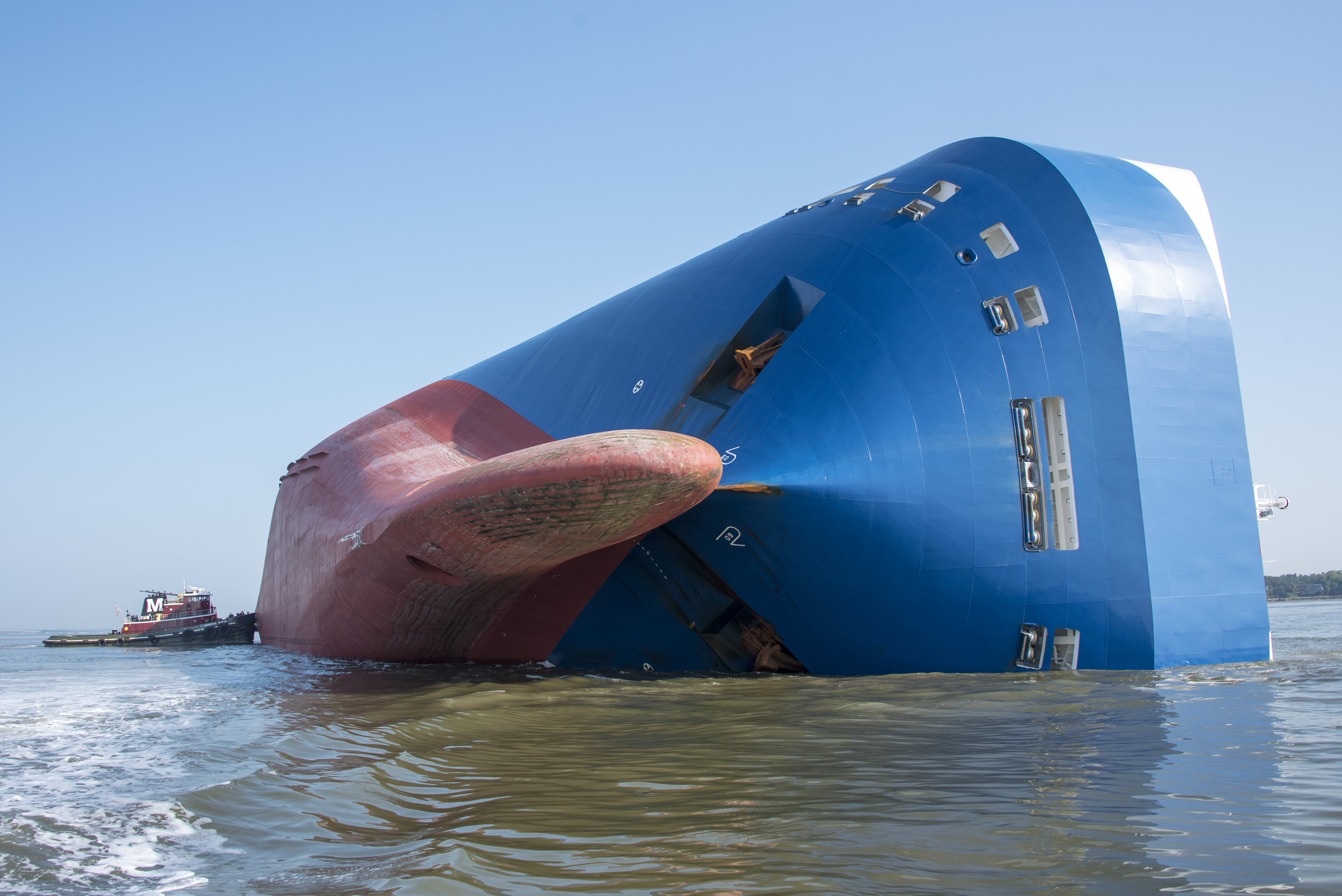
Golden Ray capsized

On 8 September 2019, Golden Ray, built in 2017 and flying the Marshall Islands flag, capsized within the Port of Brunswick's harbour, shortly after unberthing and proceeding towards Port of Baltimore. Four of the 23 crew members were initially missing, but all were eventually rescued and appeared to be in good medical condition. The incident was mentioned as related to a sudden loss of stability possibly due to cargo stowage and incorrect water ballasting. A Hyundai Glovis executive told the news media that "there was some kind of an internal fire that could not be controlled and then it capsized". The National Transportation Safety Board agreed to assist in the investigation of the cause of the incident with two investigators assigned to the case.

On 3 November 2019, MV Glovis Captain arrived in Southampton after facing extreme weather conditions in the English Channel. The abnormal rolling caused the breaking of several cargo lashings, causing damage to cargo on her main deck. Brand-new trucks and Porsche cars destined for China, were damaged or nearly completely destroyed after being crushed against the ship’s bulkhead. The bulkhead itself suffered a hole that needed urgent repair before the vessel could restart her passage towards Asia. The cargo had to be unloaded by forklift and mafi roll trailers, being in non-driveable condition. The port stay had to be increased to over 3 days, to perform the necessary inspections, and repairs to the ship.

On 28 June 2020, the Glovis operated MV Grand Venus after completing the discharge of Tesla cars loaded in US at Zeebrugge port, collided with a LNG tanker while both adrift in proximity of Ostend and Zeebrugge outer anchorage area, waiting for assignment. Although the damages occurred were minor, the vessel required repair at Vlissingen dock before starting her consequent voyage towards Asia in July.

On 7 March 2022, the Government Pension Fund of Norway, the world's largest sovereign wealth fund, decided to place the company under observation "due to unacceptable risk that the company contributes to gross or systematic human rights violations".

== Continental rail transport ==
In August 2018, Hyundai Glovis inaugurated its transportation of containers via the Transsiberian Railway, after shipping them via sea to Vladivostok. Hyundai Glovis expects to cut the transit time from 43 days by ship on the southern route around the Eurasian landmass, via the Strait of Malacca, the Suez Canal and the Strait of Gibraltar, to 22 days by rail via Vladivostok. The 22 days are composed of "two days from Busan to Vladivostok; eight days for unloading, customs clearance, and reloading in Vladivostok; and 12 days from Vladivostok to Shushary Station near Saint Petersburg."

This is seen as a precursor to breaking up the situation of South Korea as an island, having to rely exclusively on transport to and from other countries by sea and air, by re-establishing the rail links to North Korea and thus open direct rail routes to all countries in Europa and nearly all in Asia. South Korean governments since Park Geun-hye have worked towards this goal.

For this purpose, on June 7, 2018, South Korea became an official member of the Organization for Cooperation of Railways (OSJD). "South Korea's official membership in the OSJD", Heo Seung wrote on June 8, 2018, in Hankoryeh, "means it will be able to take part in the operation of 280,000 km of international railway lines in Eurasia, which include the Trans-China Railway (TCR) and Trans-Siberian Railway (TSR). OSJD members are entitled to transport passengers and freight without the need for separate agreements with countries where the railways pass through."

== See also ==
- Hyundai Merchant Marine
- Stena Line
- EUKOR
- STX Pan Ocean
- Nippon Yusen Kaisha
- Siem Shipping
- KESS - K Line Europe Short Sea
- United European Car Carriers
- MV Asian Glory
- Hyundai Glovis Rugby

== Ships gallery ==
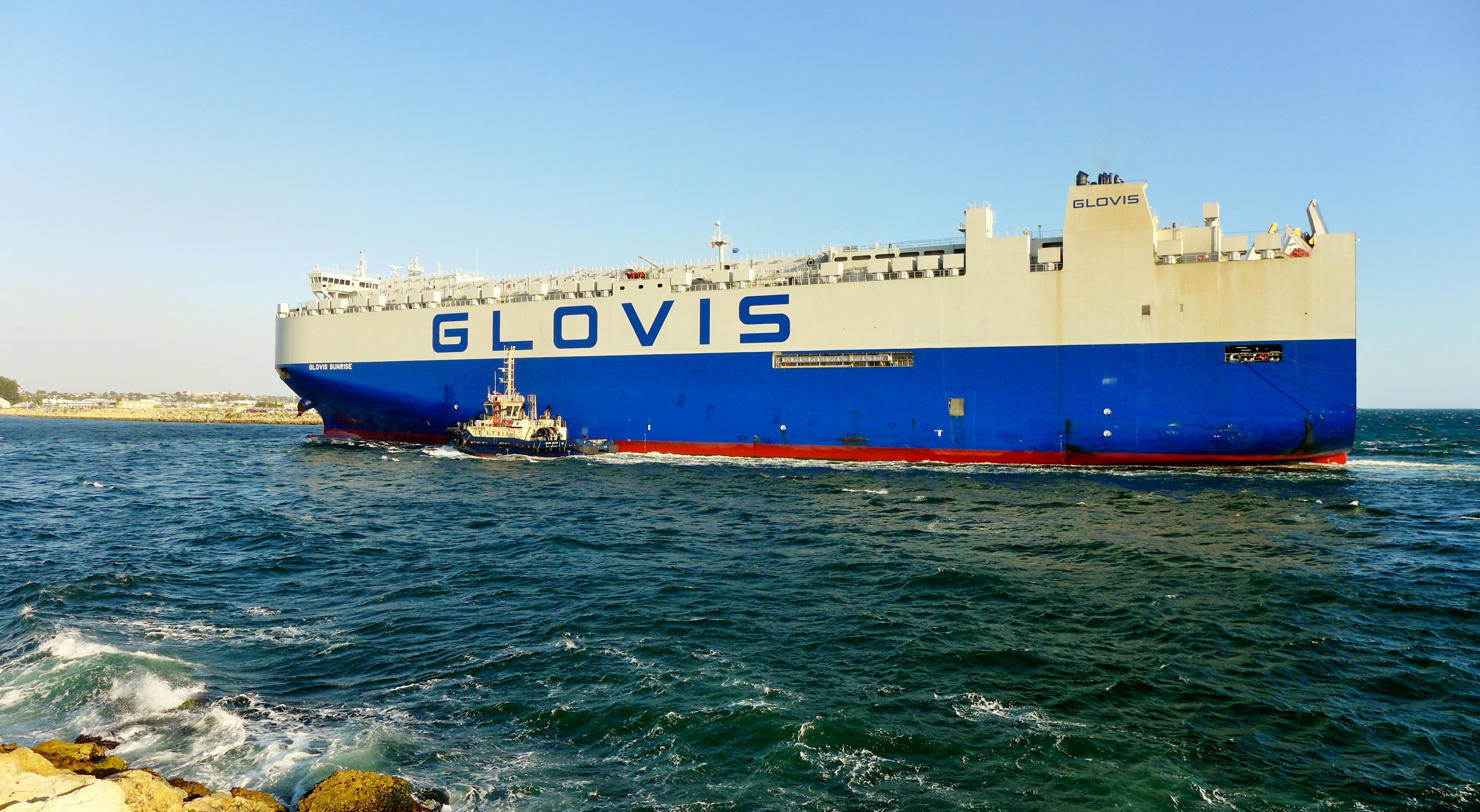
Glovis ship

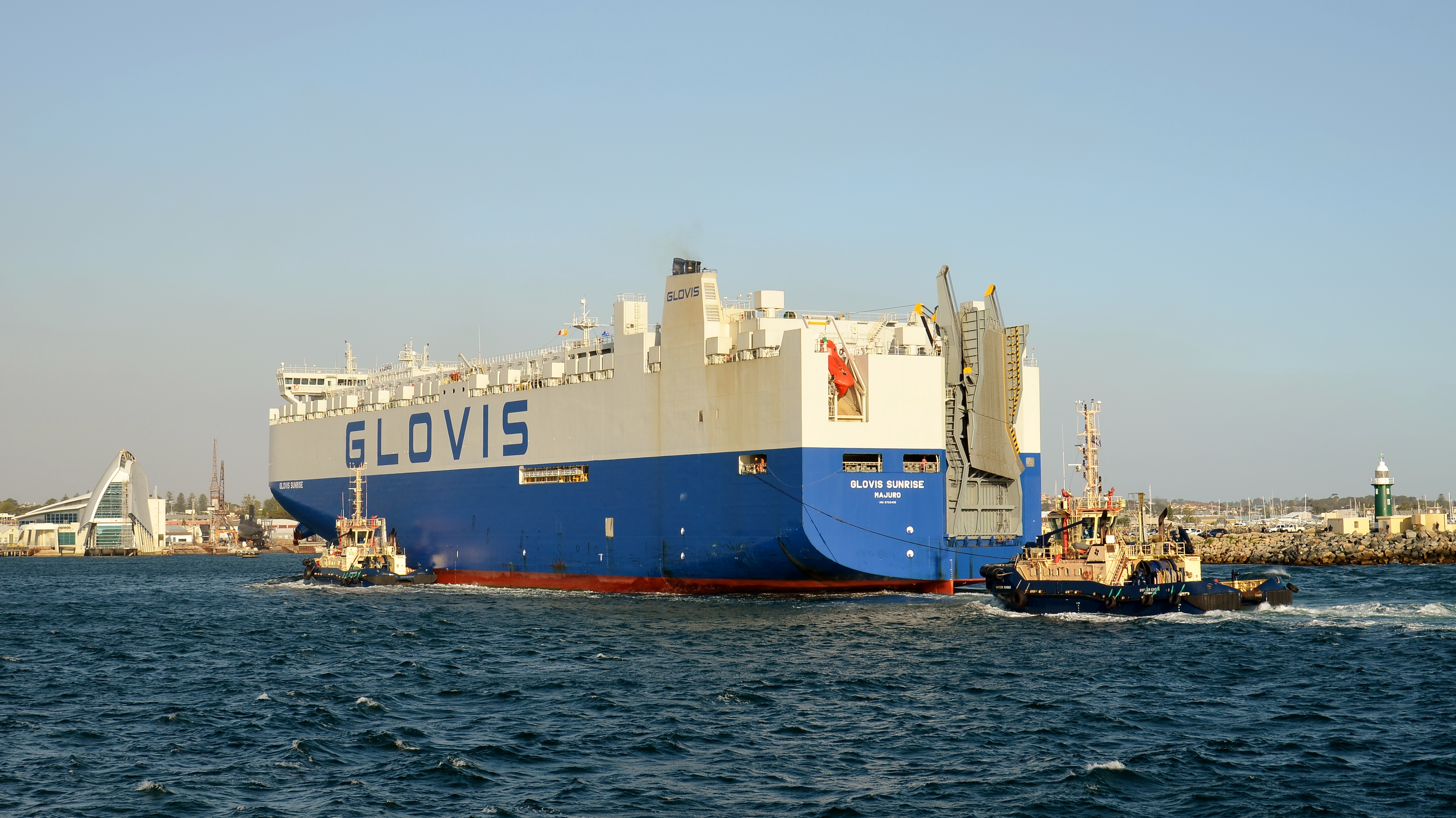
Glovis Sunrise

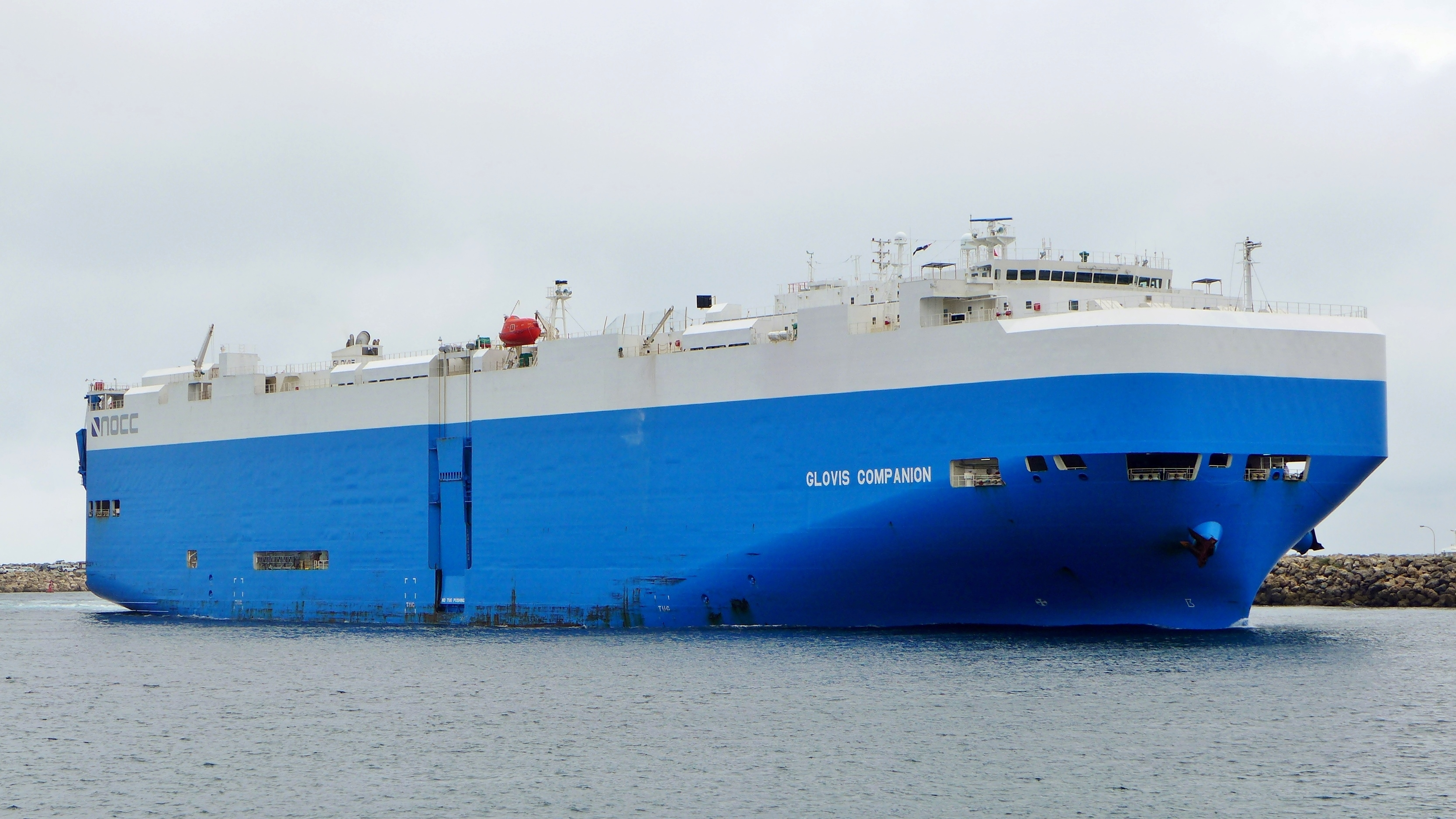
Glovis Companion

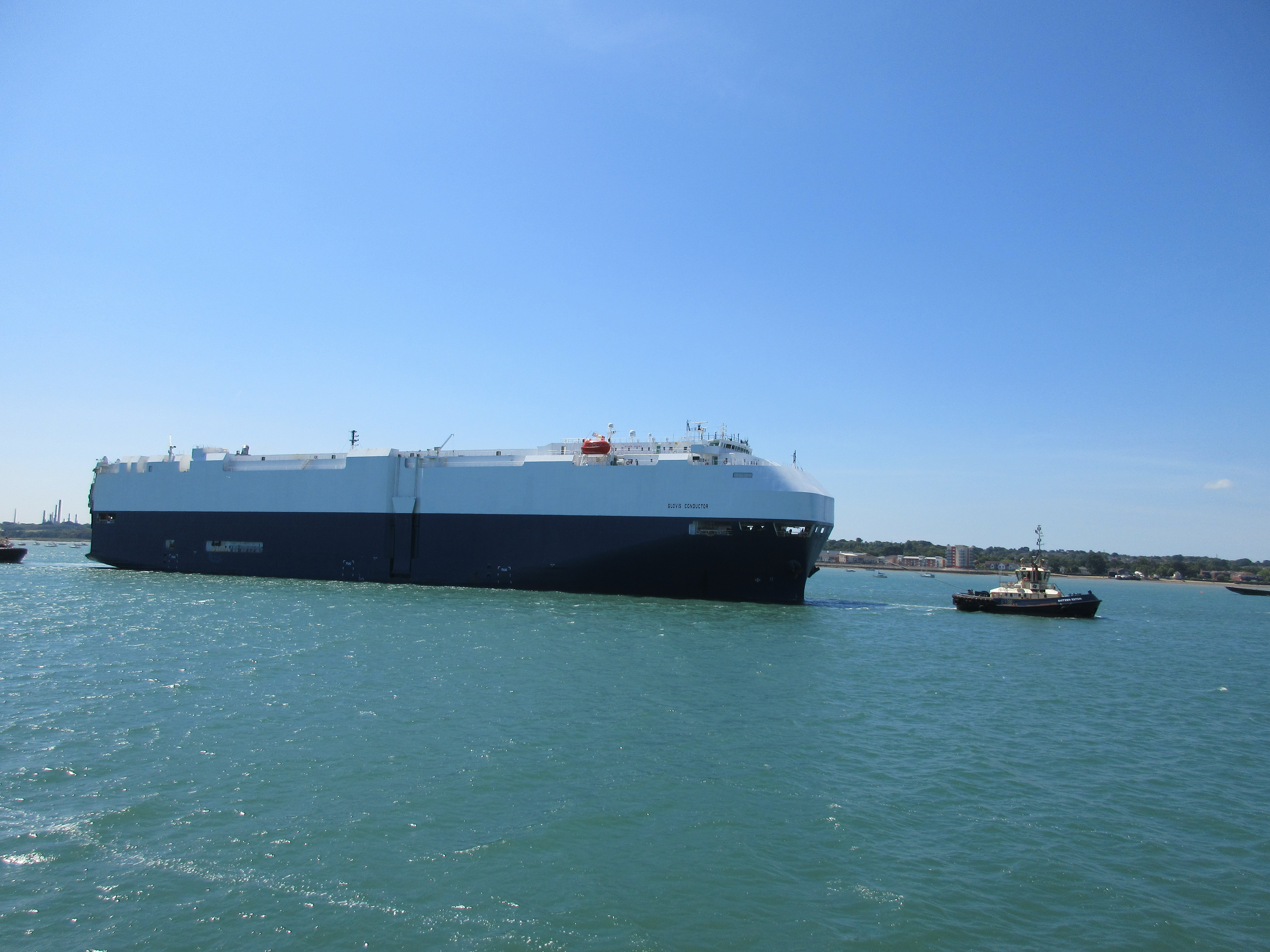
Glovis Conductor

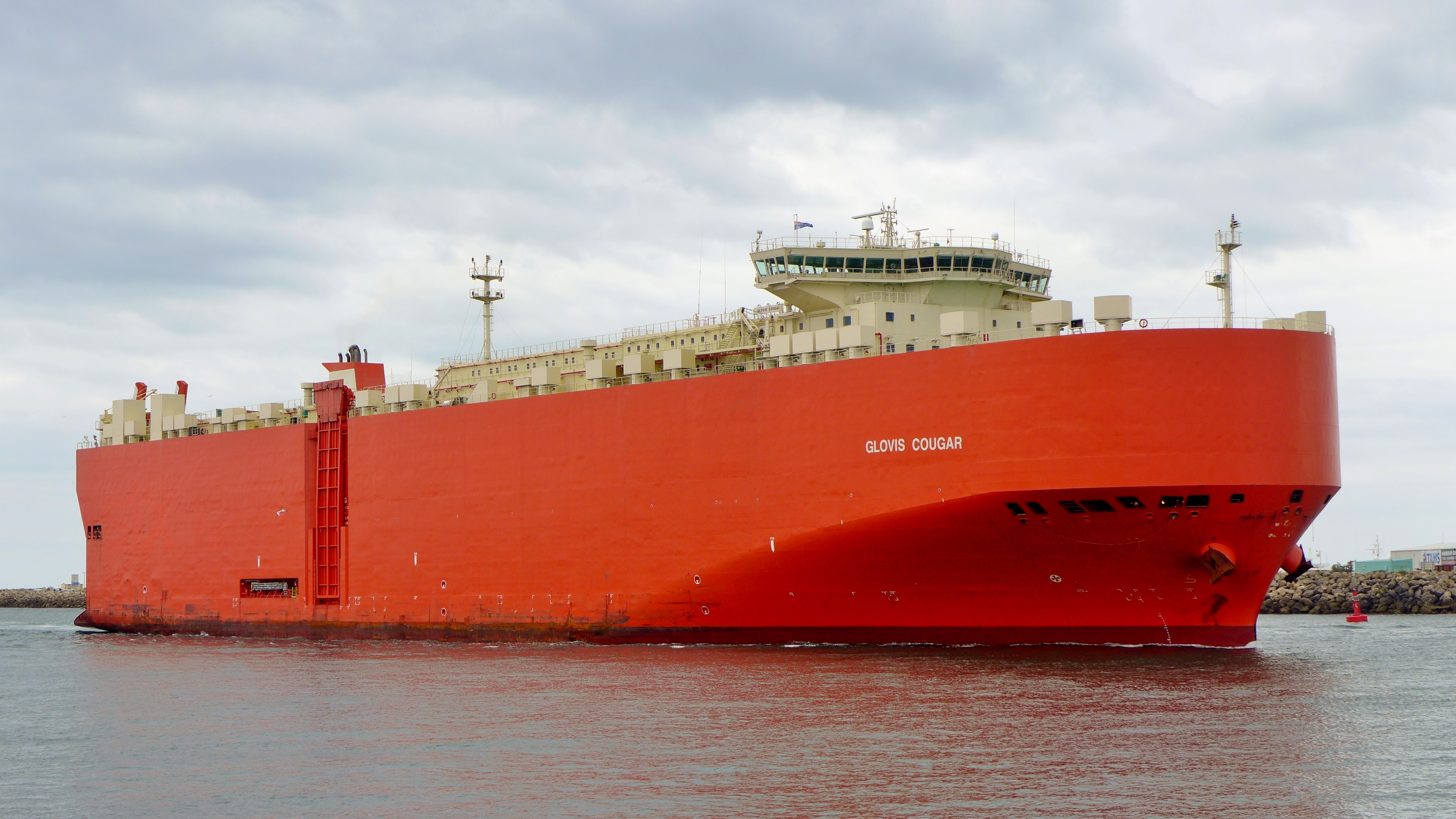
Glovis Cougar

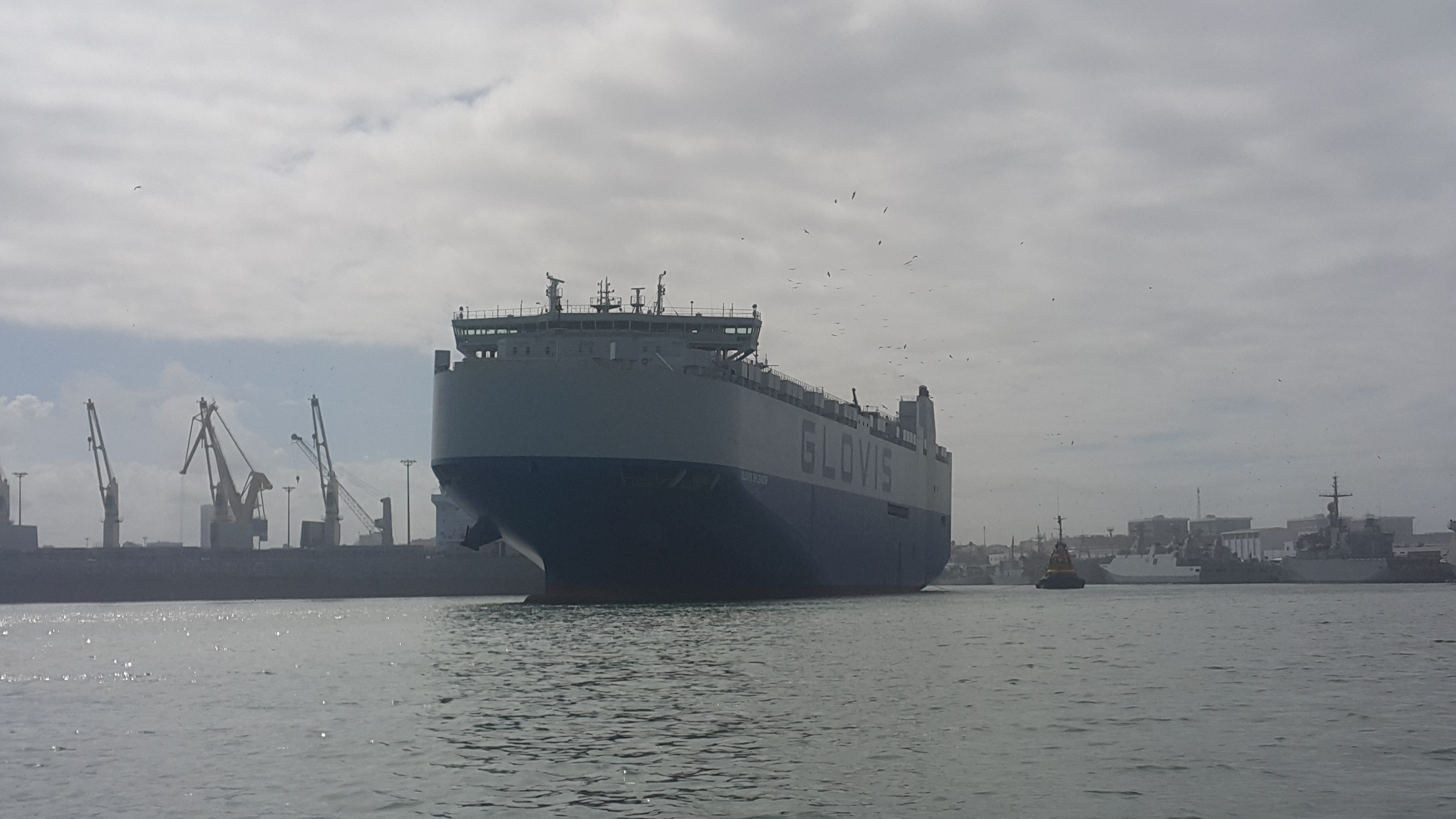
Glovis Splendor

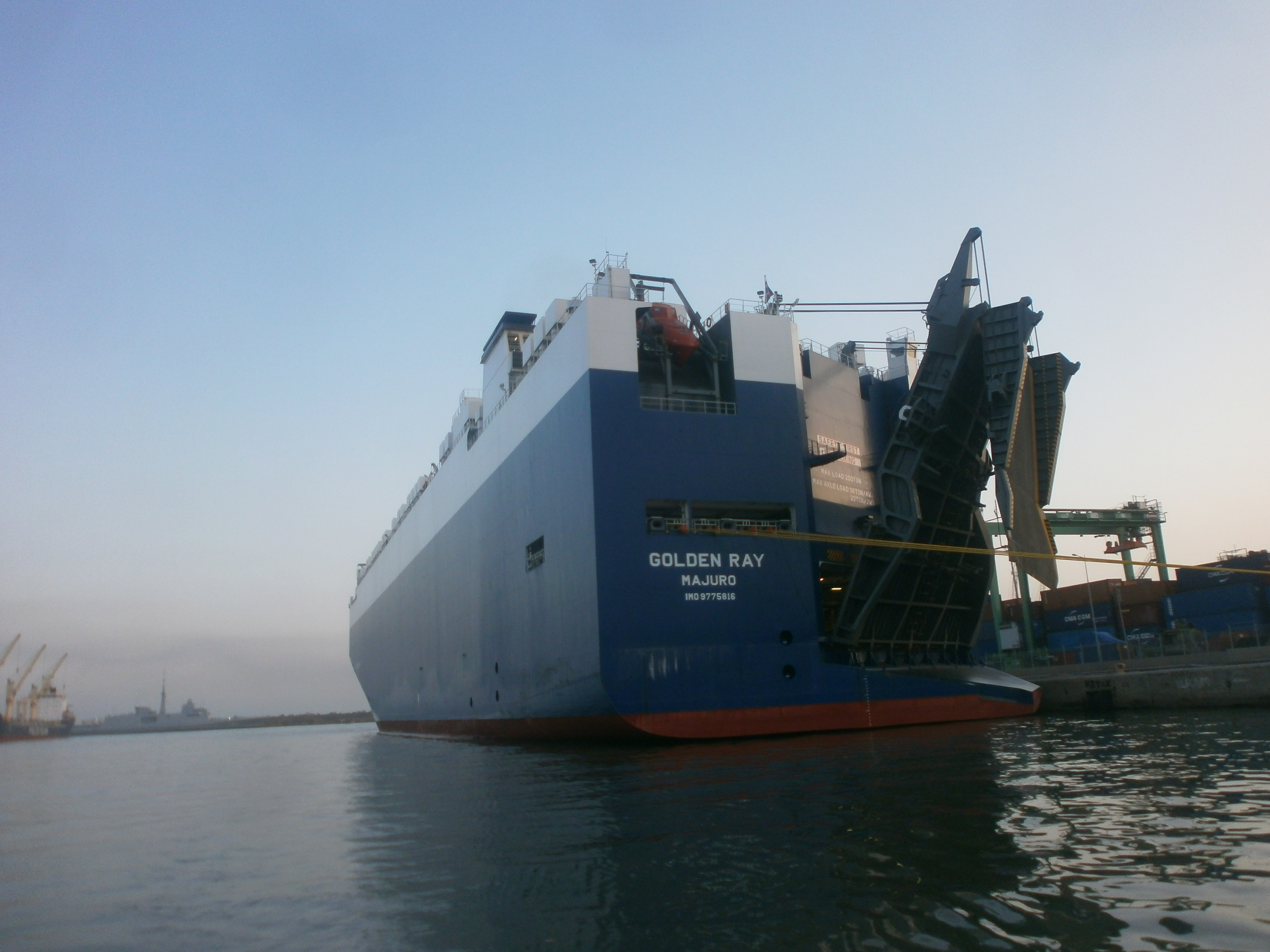
Golden Ray in the port of Casablanca (2018)

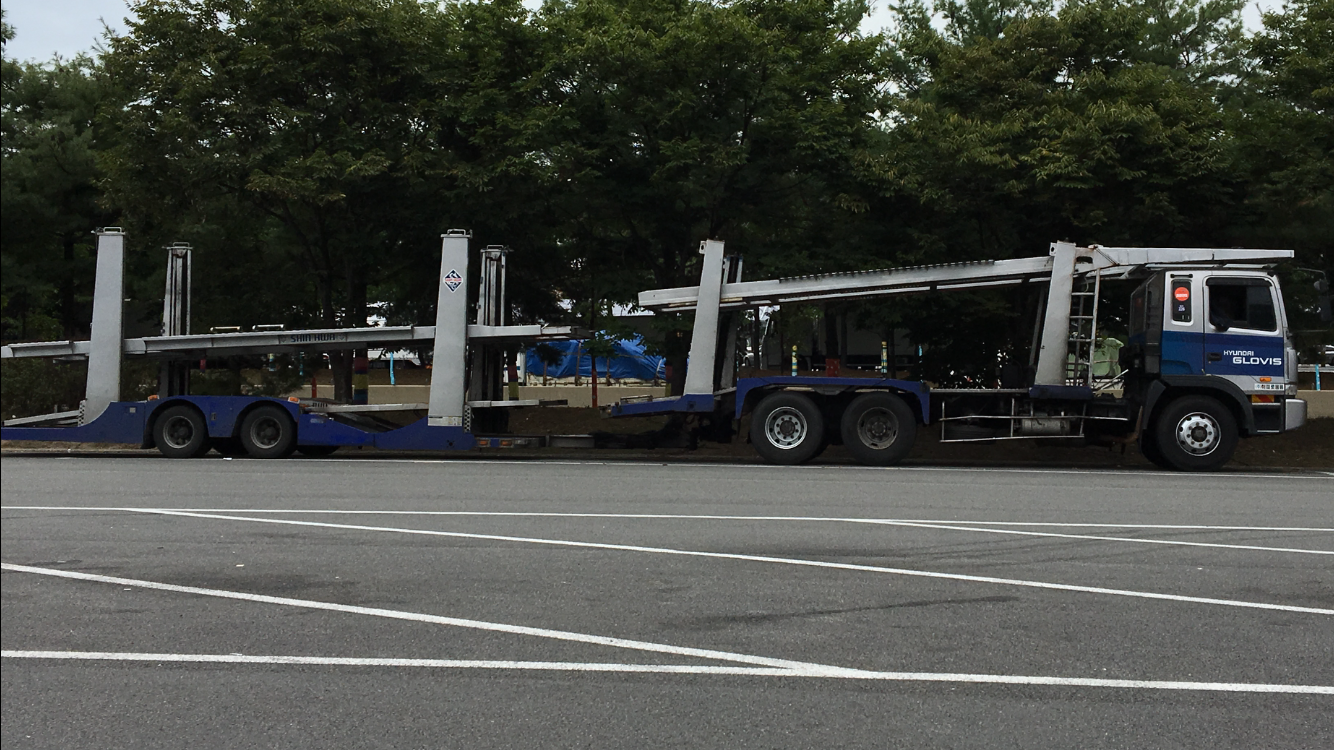
Glovis car carrier trailer

Hyundai Glovis truck in Ukraine.
