= Paul Altier =

Hong Kong rugby union player

- Full name: Paul Altier
- Born: 19 May 1999 (age 27) Thailand
- Height: 183 cm (6 ft 0 in)
- Weight: 87 kg (192 lb; 13 st 10 lb)
- University: University of Bath

Rugby union career
- Position: Utility Back
- Current team: SO Chambéry
Youth career
- 2008-2017: Valley RFC
Senior career
| Years | Team | Apps | (Points) |
| 2017-2019 | Valley RFC | ?? | (??) |
| 2019-2021 | University of Bath | 4 | (0) |
| 2020 | Bath United | 1 | (5) |
| 2021-2022 | Stade Dijonnais | 21 | (35) |
| 2022- | SO Chambéry | 27 | (32) |
- Correct as of 27 June 2024
International career
| Years | Team | Apps | (Points) |
| 2016-2018 | Hong Kong China under-19 | 5 | (61) |
| 2016-2019 | Hong Kong China under-20 | 15 | (93) |
| 2019- | Hong Kong China | 11 | (88) |
| 2019 | Hong Kong China XV | 1 | (12) |
- Correct as of 27 June 2024
National sevens team
| Years | Team | | Comps |
| 2017-2019 | Hong Kong China under-20 | | 4 |
- Correct as of 27 June 2024

Paul Baptiste Florent Altier (born 19 May 1999) is a Hong Kong China rugby union player who plays for SO Chambéry in the French Nationale 1.

== Club career ==
=== Valley RFC ===
Altier began his career at Valley RFC, winning the Hong Kong Premiership twice.

=== Bath University and Bath United ===
He moved to England to study at Bath University, where he featured for the 1st XV in BUCS Super Rugby 4 times making his debut against Loughborough University. While at Bath University he featured for Bath United in a match against Harlequins 'A' were in which he came off the bench and scored a try.

=== Stade Dijonnais ===
He signed for Stade Dijonnais in May 2021, he started 20 out of 21 games, scoring 7 tries. He originally signed a one-year extension, with the club however he pulled out and moved to SO Chambéry.

=== SO Chambéry ===
In 2022 with Stade Dijonnais being relegated to Nationale 2, Altier signed a two-year contract with Nationale 1 side SO Chambéry. Making his debut against Valence Romans coming off the bench in a 11–15 win. In April 2024 he extended his contract another year.

== International career ==
=== Hong Kong China under-19 ===
Altier played for the Hong Kong Under-19 side in the 2017 and 2018 Asia Rugby Under-19 Championship winning the tournament in both years helping Hong Kong qualify for the World Rugby U20 Trophy. He was the top point scorer in the 2017 and 2018 tournaments with 22 points and 39 points.

=== Hong Kong China under-20 ===
Altier played in 4 consecutive World Rugby U20 Trophy tournaments, beginning in 2016 Hong Kong's first ever tournament. He came off the bench in Hong Kong's first ever win in the World Rugby U20 Trophy. A 44–40 win over host Zimbabwe. In the 2018 edition of the tournament in a match against host Romania, Altier scored 36 points in a 35–56 win.

He played in 4 tournaments for the Hong Kong under-20 sevens side, he won the Asia Rugby Under-20 Sevens Championship in three consecutive years: 2017, 2018, 2019. In the 2017 tournament he scored the second most points behind Kit Fung Fong. In the 2018 edition of the tournament he was the top point scorer with 38 points. He also represented Hong Kong at the Coral Coast Sevens in Fiji.

=== Hong Kong China ===
He made his debut for the senior side in 2019, starting at fly half against Malaysia in the Asia Rugby Championship. He scored a conversion and a penalty in the 30–24 win. He didn't notfeature in the following tournament however did feature in 2023, and 2024. In 2023 he only featured once against Malaysia getting red carded in the 63rd minute. In the 2024 tournament he was the top point and try scorer starting in all of Hong Kong China's matches.

=== Hong Kong China XV ===
He played in an uncapped match for Hong Kong China against the South China Tigers, 32–17.

== Honors ==
=== Hong Kong China Under-19 ===
- Asia Rugby Under-19 Championship
  - Champions: (2) 2017, 2018

==== Hong Kong China Under-20 Sevens ====
- Asia Rugby Under-20 Sevens Championship
  - Champions: (3) 2017, 2018, 2019

=== Hong Kong China ===
- Asia Rugby Championship
  - Champions: (3) 2019, 2023, 2024

=== Valley RFC ===
- Hong Kong Premiership
  - Champions: (2) 2017, 2018
