= Andrew Douglas (rugby union) =

New Zealand rugby union coach

- Born: 1971 (age 54–55) Waikato, New Zealand

Rugby union career
- Position: Fly-half
- Current team: Hong Kong
Coaching career
- Years: Team
- 2009–2011: New Zealand Schools
- 2012–2017: Waikato Rugby Union
- 2017–2018: Biella Rugby Club
- 2018–2019: Toyota Shuttles (Asst.)
- 2019–2022: Old Glory DC
- 2023–2025: Hong Kong mens
- 2024: Hong Kong women's
- 2026–: Hong Kong mens

Andrew Douglas is a New Zealand rugby union coach, currently the head coach of the Hong Kong representative men's team.

== Professional rugby career ==
Douglas first started coaching in 1997, after injuries to the fly-half saw him turn to coaching. A teacher by trade, Douglas coached at the Hautapu Sports club in Cambridge, New Zealand, coaching the 'B' team for two season, before heading overseas.

In 2006, he returned to New Zealand and became head coach of the Hautapu Sports club Premier rugby side, and in three seasons the team won the local championship twice, and were runners-up on the other occasion.

Along side his coaching duties at Hautapu, Douglas was also employed as Sports Manager and then Deputy Principal at St Peter's School, from where he also coached the New Zealand Schools team from 2009–2011.

In 2012, he was hired by Waikato Rugby Union, and coached at under-19 level, and was an assistant coach to their senior representative squad, in the Mitre 10 Cup competition, as well as a consultant with Super Rugby side, the Chiefs.

On 31 May 2017, Italian side Biella Rugby Club announced that Andrew Douglas was their new coach for their 2017-18 season. In Piedmont, Douglas guided Biella to promotion into Serie A in 2018, and on 14 May 2018, just days after achieving promotion, he announced that he was leaving to take up a role as Attack and Backs Coach for the Toyota Shuttles of Japan's Top League.

He joined up with the team ahead of the 2018 Top League season, which saw the side be relegated form the top tier of Japanese rugby.

On 9 May 2019, newly created Major League Rugby outfit Old Glory DC announced that Douglas was hired as their coach for their inaugural 2019 season. With the team not expected to join MLR until the 2020 season, a series of exhibition games were arranged, with the New Zealander intended as being Head Coach for the duration. With Douglas at the helm, the team faced Ireland's Shannon RFC, Scotland U20s, Canada's Ontario Blues and the USA Rugby South Panthers respectively. While Old Glory lost the first two of these games, the campaign ultimately ended in a 2-2 record.

On 20 September 2019, Old Glory announced that Douglas had been hired as permanent Head Coach for the 2020 season with a contract running until 2021. In his debut season in the MLR was cut short due to the COVID-19 pandemic, and in 2021 when the season relaunched, he led the side to fifth place in the Eastern Conference.

He returned to lead the side in 2022, but departed from the club effective immediately in March after failing to lead the side to any win within the first seven rounds of the tournament.

After leaving Old Glory, Douglas returned home to New Zealand and took up a role back at Hautapu Sports club as general manager.

In August 2023, Douglas was appointed Head of Technical and Elite Coaching at Hong Kong China Rugby, and therefore became the head coach of the Hong Kong national mens team.

His first set of test matches in charge was a two-test home series against Germany, where Hong Kong won both tests 29–16 and 46–10. He later led the side to the Asia Rugby Championship title in June 2024, before embarking on an historic tour of South America during the 2024 July test window; losing to Chile but defeating Paraguay and Brazil.

In September 2024, he led the Hong Kong national women's team in the 2024 WXV 3 tournament, securing just one win against Madagascar in the second round.

In July 2025, Douglas led Hong Kong to qualification for the 2027 Rugby World Cup, becoming the second Asian team to make the World Cup.

Since helping secure qualifcaion for the World Cup, Douglas became a Director of Rugby for the Hong Kong in August 2025, with a direct remit to oversee a new full-time men’s programme to prepare for the World Cup campaign.

On 27 August 2026, it was announced that Douglas had returned as Head Coach of the Hong Kong national team alongside his Director of Rugby role, which saw Asplin repurposed as an assistant coach.

Sporting positions
Preceded by (Wales) Lewis Evans	Hong Kong national rugby union coach 2023–2025	Succeeded by (New Zealand) Logan Asplin
Preceded by (New Zealand) Logan Asplin	Hong Kong national rugby union coach 2026–present	Succeeded by Incumbent
