= Pan Ocean =

South Korea-based shipping company

Pan Ocean Co., Ltd.
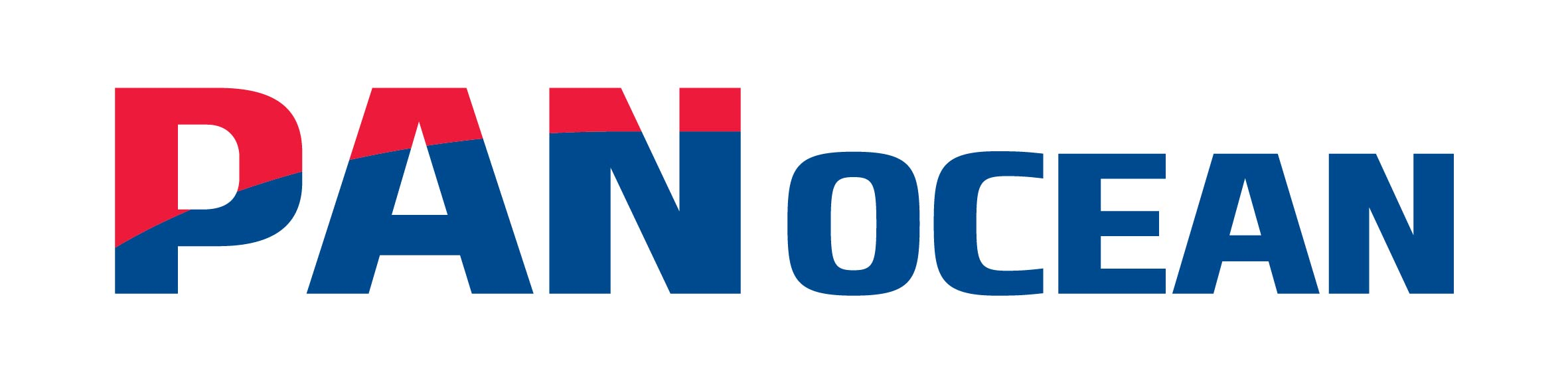
- Native name: 팬오션 주식회사
- Formerly: STX Pan Ocean
- Type: Public
- Traded as: KRX: 028670
- Industry: Maritime
- Founded: 1966; 60 years ago
- Headquarters: Seoul, South Korea
- Parent: Harim Group
- Website: www.panocean.com/en

Pan Ocean Co., Ltd. is a shipping company headquartered in Seoul, South Korea. It is an affiliated company of Harim Group.

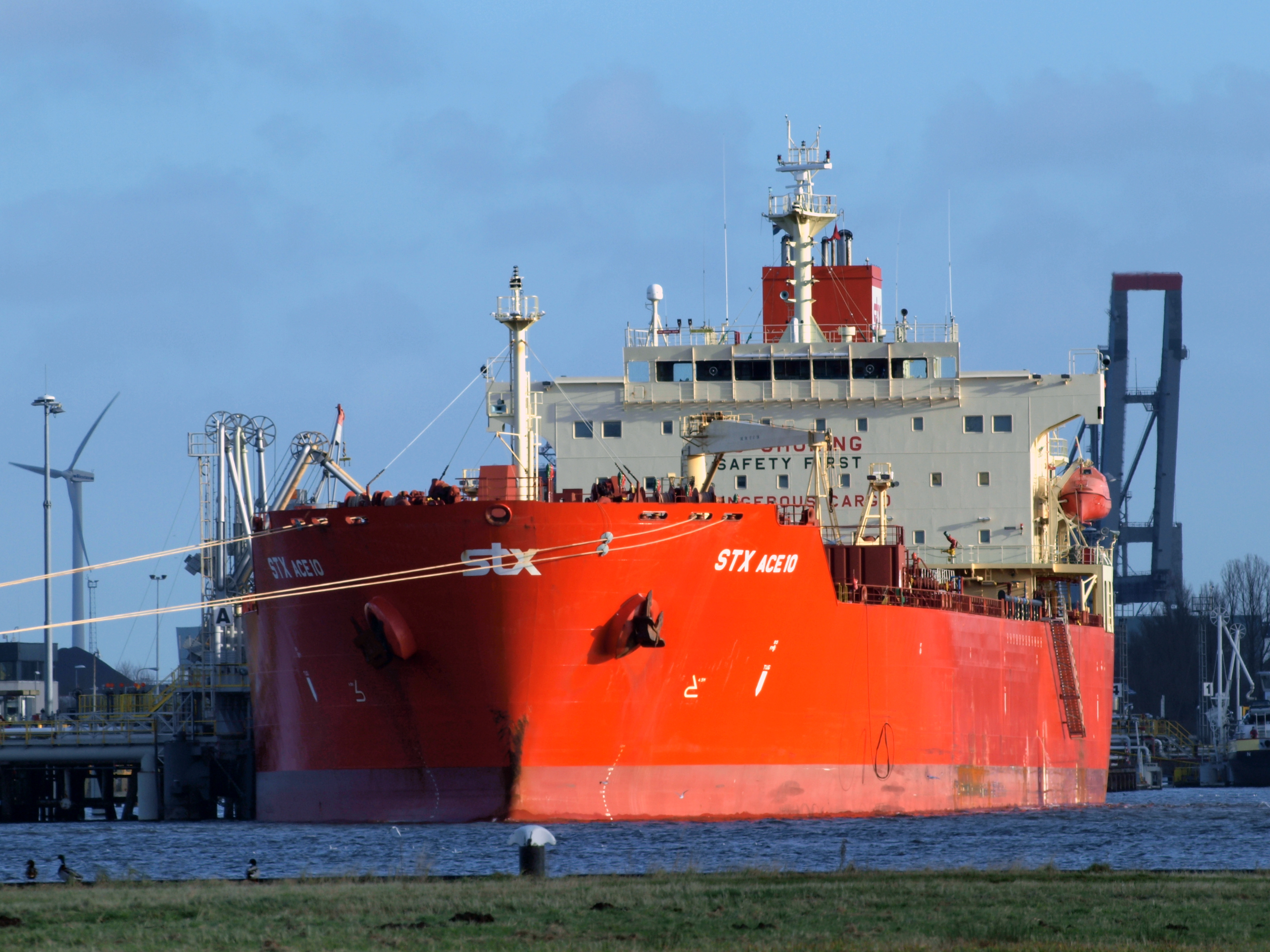
mv Stx Ace 10

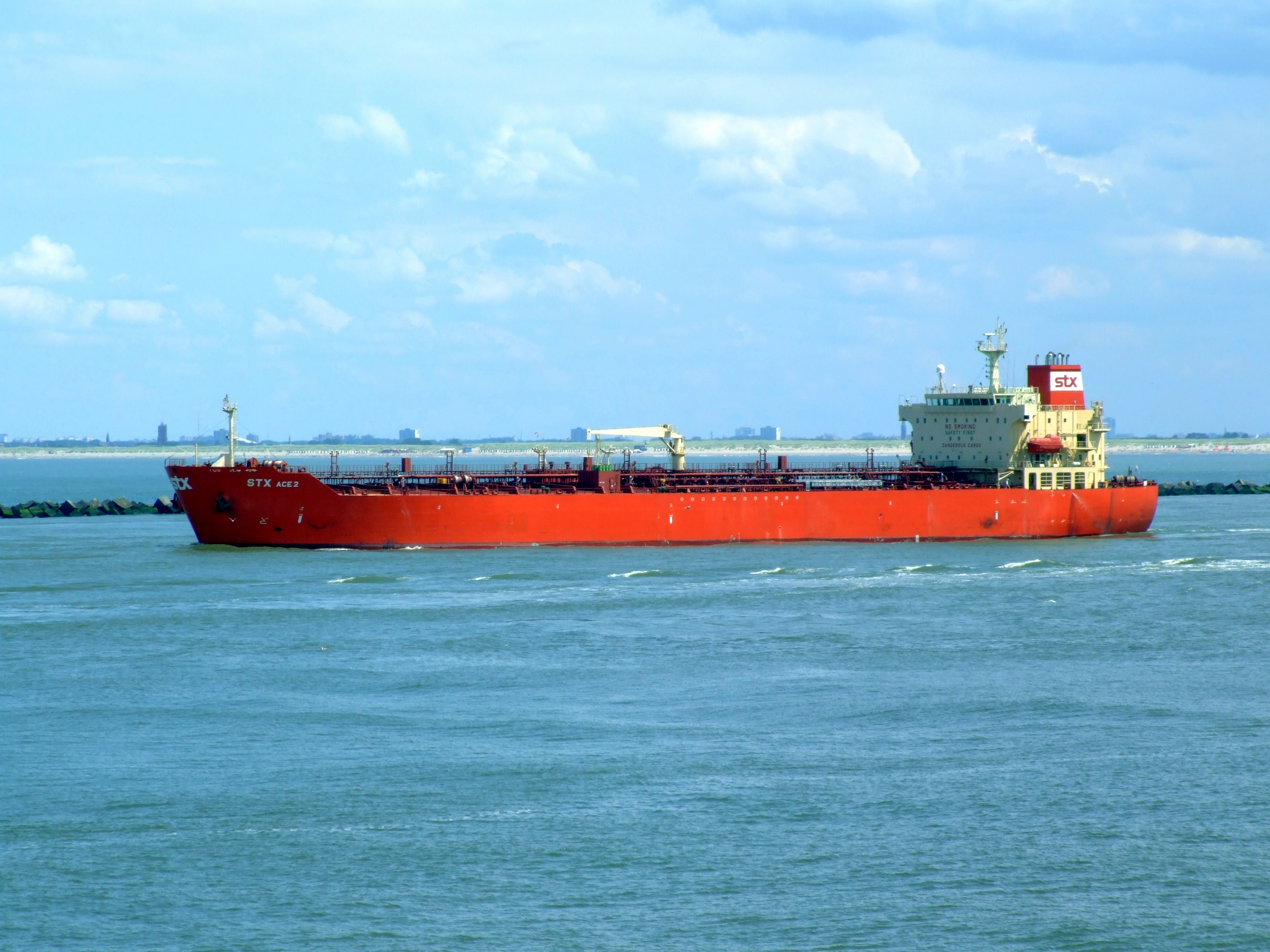
mv STX Ace 2

== Overview ==
The company has gained a worldwide reputation in the bulk carrier industry, and in other services such as container ships, oil tankers and LNG carriers. Its sales volume reached an average of 5,117 million dollars per year. The number of its employees is approximately 2,500, and the number of vessels owned by the company exceeds 340.

STX Pan Ocean has been selected as the first-place company in the "Korea's Most Admired Company" by the Korea Management Association Consulting (KMAC) for three consecutive years.

Originally the company was active in the car transportation industry, by operating 7 pure car/truck carrier (PCTC) vessels, before discontinuing this business.

On June 7, 2013, STX Pan Ocean went bankrupt, rebranding as Pan Ocean, dropping the STX reference after the STX Offshore & Shipbuilding conglomerate sold its majority stake in the former joint venture.

Under the brand Pan Ocean, the company still operates a fleet of 400,000-ton very large ore carriers known as Valemax ships. On 5 December 2011 the first ship of her type, Vale Beijing, suffered structural damage during her first cargo loading, a leak in her ballast tank, which put the ship in danger of sinking at the port of Ponta da Madeira in Brazil. However, the disaster was avoided, and after having been anchored off the harbour for over three months, Vale Beijing left São Luís for Sohar, Oman. After unloading, she returned to STX shipyard in South Korea for inspection and repairs.

== See also ==
- STX Europe
- STX Finland Cruise Oy
- STX France Cruise SA
- STX Offshore & Shipbuilding
- Hyundai Glovis
- EUKOR
