= Lee Dong-chae =

South Korean billionaire (born 1959)

- 이동채
- Born: December 10, 1959 (age 66); Pohang, South Korea
- Education: Yeungnam University
- Occupation: Businessman
- Employer: Eco Pro
- Children: Lee Seung-hwan; Lee Yeon-su

Korean name
- Hangul: 이동채
- RR: I Dongchae
- MR: I Tongch'ae

Lee Dong-chae (Korean: 이동채; born December 10, 1959) is a South Korean businessman. The founder and largest shareholder (18.83% as of 2024) of the company Eco Pro, he is among the richest people in South Korea. In December 2024, Forbes estimated his net worth at US$1.7 billion and ranked the 16th richest person in the county.

== Biography ==
Lee was born on December 10, 1959 in Pohang, South Korea as the second of eight children (all sisters, except for him). He graduated from Daegu Commercial High School and Yeungnam University with a major in business administration. He worked at Housing & Commercial Bank and Samsung Electronics, then became certified as a Certified Public Accountant. In 1998, he founded the predecessor to Eco Pro (코리아제오륨); it changed names to Eco Pro in 2001. The company began trading battery precursors in 2004, and this arm of the business soon grew to become one of its most significant. In 2007, the company was listed on the KOSDAQ stock exchange.

He stepped down as CEO of the company in March 2022 and made an advisor, amidst allegations of and investigations into his insider trading. On May 11, 2023, he was found guilty of insider trading valued at ₩1.1 billion, fined ₩2.2 billion and a surcharge of ₩1.1 billion, and sentenced to 15 months in prison. He appealed the verdict, but the Supreme Court rejected his appeal. After serving around half his sentence, he received a special pardon and was released from prison in August 2024. He then returned to his advisory role to the company.

In December 2024, months after his release from prison, Eco Pro began to be investigated for allegations of having a slush fund for the purpose of tax avoidance.

== Personal life ==
He is married to Kim Ae-hee (김애희), with whom he has a son, Lee Seung-hwan (이승환; born 1989), and a daughter, Lee Yeon-su (이연수; born 1991). Both his children graduated from Yonsei University and are executives at Eco Pro.
