= 2024 Asia Rugby Championship division tournaments =

2024 ARC division tournaments
- Date: 28 April – 4 May 2024

Tournament statistics

2024 Asia Rugby Division 1
Tournament details
- Host: Sri Lanka
- Venue: Colombo Racecourse, Colombo
- Date: 30 April - 5 May 2024
- Countries: 4

Final positions
- Champions: Sri Lanka
- Runner-up: Kazakhstan
- Third place: Qatar
- Fourth place: India

Tournament statistics
- Matches played: 4
- Tries scored: 33 (8.25 per match)
- Attendance: 28,500 (7,125 per match)
- Top scorer(s): (Sri Lanka) Tarinda Ratwatte (28 points)
- Most tries: (Sri Lanka) Thenuka Nanayakkara (3 tries)

The 2024 Asia Rugby Championship division tournaments refers to the divisions played within the annual international rugby union tournament for the Asian region. The main Asia Rugby Championship (ARC) is contested by the top four teams in Asia excluding Japan. The other national teams in Asia compete in divisional tournaments.

Two divisional tournaments were initially proposed for 2024, with Division 1 to be held in Sri Lanka and Division 2 in Kazakhstan. There was also suggestion of a Division 3 in Lebanon, although this was not announced by Asia Rugby. Ultimately, with teams pulling out, the tournaments were merged. The national teams of Sri Lanka, Qatar, Kazakhstan, and India then competed in Division 1 for promotion to the Asia Rugby Championship.

Singapore Rugby organised the 2024 Tri Union Series, allowing Chinese Taipei, Singapore and Thailand to play international rugby.

== Teams ==
The following teams were announced as playing the 2024 tournaments:

Division One
Nation	Coach	Captain	World Rugby Ranking	
Nation	Coach	Captain	Start	End
Qatar	(New Zealand) Fred Moe	Tom Featherstone	94th	90th
Kazakhstan	(Kazakhstan) Timur Mashurov	Magomedrassul Magomedov	64th	64th
Sri Lanka	(Sri Lanka) Sanath Martis	Suhiru Anthony	44th	41st
India	(South Africa) Naas Botha	Deepak Punia	87th	89th

== Division 1 ==
The Division 1 Tournament was held from 30 April to 5 May at Colombo Racecourse, Sri Lanka.

Semi-finals
30 April – Colombo
Qatar	31
Kazakhstan	33
30 April – Colombo
Sri Lanka	45
India	10

Final
4 May – Colombo
Kazakhstan	7
Sri Lanka	45
3rd/4th Playoff Final
4 May – Colombo
Qatar	34
India	25

=== Matches ===
==== Semi Finals ====
30 April 2024
16:00 IST (UTC+05:30)

Qatar	31–33	Kazakhstan
Try: Johnston 1' c, Lotter 34' c, Rakabu 40' c, Bezuidenhout 53' c Con: Tremayne 2' 35' 40' 54' (4/4); Pen: Tremayne 64' (1/1); Cards: Lotter (yellow card) 75' to 83'	Report	Try: Litvinov 4' c, Petukhov 26' c, Nazhibayev 45' m, Chsherbakov 56' c, Lymar 66' c Con: Nazhibayev 4' 27' 57' 67' (4/5); Cards: Akymbeov (yellow card) 1' to 11', Ivanov (yellow card) 37' to 47'

Colombo Racecourse, Sri Lanka
Attendance: 1,000
Referee: (Sri Lanka) Ishanka Abeykoon

FB	15	Iliesa Rakabu
RW	14	Beau Swart
OC	13	Frank Hughes
IC	12	Johann-Henry Bezuidenhout
LW	11	Pita Beracibi
FH	10	Brook Tremayne
SH	9	James Philips
N8	8	Elliot Johnston
OF	7	Guillermo Villegas Bardo
BF	6	Tom Featherstone (c)
RL	5	Darshan Gangineni
LL	4	Ismail El Hatmi
TP	3	Samuel Spencer
HK	2	Wade Lotter
LP	1	Nicky Lock
Replacements:
	16	Joseph de Silva Goonetilleke
	17	Hassan Elsabeh
	25	Abdulaziz Al-Dosari
	19	Hendrick Botha
	20	Hamza Saied
	21	Paul Schwartz
	22	Ryan Dodds
	23	John Lee Millar
Coach:
(New Zealand) Fred Moe

FB	15	Abdrakham Nazhibayev
RW	14	Maxim Petukhov
OC	13	Alexander Lymar
IC	12	Armanzhan Vassilov
LW	11	Roman Chsherbakov
FH	10	Daulet Akymbekov
SH	9	Alexey Lukmanov
N8	8	Magomedrassul Magomedov (c)
OF	7	Onlassyn Tursenbek
BF	6	Nikita Ivanov
RL	5	Timur Timoshin
LL	4	Timofei Maksimenko
TP	3	Georgiy Litvinov
HK	2	Akhiyat Imam
LP	1	Adam Gadaborshev
Replacements:
	16	Alexandr Belashov
	17	Daniel Simskiy
	18	Damir Kazibekov
	19	Rodion Shipitsin
	20	Yegor Khromov
	21	Alisher Abdrakov
	22	Jalil Muradov
	23	Ali Boekeyhan Suerer
Coach:
(Kazakhstan) Timur Mashurov

30 April 2024
19:00 IST (UTC+05:30)

Sri Lanka	45–10	India
Try: Dissanayake 15' c 45' m, Nanayakkara 18' c 55' c, Ekanayake 33' c, Ratwatte 74' c, Sampath 80' c Con: Ratwatte 16' 19' 34' 57' (4/6), Sampath 80' (1/1); Cards: Madushanka (yellow card) 62' to 72'	Report	Try: P. Tanwar 63' c Con: Punia 64' (1/1); Pen: Punia 3' (1/1); Cards: Hansdah (yellow card) 40' to 50'

Colombo Racecourse, Sri Lanka
Attendance: 6,500
Referee: (Singapore) Just Wang

FB	15	Sudaraka Dickubura
RW	14	Sudaraka Dickubura
OC	13	Akash Madusanka
IC	12	Tarinda Ratwatte
LW	11	Dinal Ekanayake
FH	10	Thenuka Nanayakkara
SH	9	Heshan Jenson
N8	8	Lasindu Karunathilaka
OF	7	Tharindu Chathuranga
BF	6	Adeesha Weerathunga
RL	5	Raveen de Silva
LL	4	Suhiru Anthony (c)
TP	3	Janidu Fernando
HK	2	Pulasthi Dasanayaka
LP	1	Charith Silva
Replacements:
	16	Azimir Fajudeen
	17	Dushmantha Priyadarshana
	18	Faiz Abdulla
	19	Shasika Fernando
	20	Nalaka Maduranga
	21	Kavindu Costa
	22	Hirantha Perera
	23	Hirusha Nethmina
Coach:
(Sri Lanka) Sanath Martis

FB	15	Ajit Hansdah
RW	14	Abhishek Shukla
OC	13	Prince Khatri
IC	12	Mohit Khatri
LW	11	Javed Hussain
FH	10	Deepak Punia (c)
SH	9	Sukumar Hembrom
N8	8	Neeraj Khatri
OF	7	Devendra Padir
BF	6	Joginder
RL	5	Hitesh Dagar
LL	4	Shivam Shukla
TP	3	Bhumpendra Bokan
HK	2	Sure Prasad
LP	1	Mannu Tanwar
Replacements:
	16	Bharat Dagar
	17	Harvinder Singh
	18	Pradeep Tanwar
	19	Sanket Patil
	20	Suresh Kumar
	21	Sakti Nag
	22	Asis Sabar
	23	Rajdeep Saha
Coach:
(South Africa) Naas Botha

==== 3rd/4th Place ====
4 May 2024
16:00 IST (UTC+05:30)

Qatar	34–25	India
Try: Philips 2' c 68' m, Lock 6' c, Beracibi 13' c, Rakabu 19' c Con: Rakabu 3', Tremayne 7' 14'; Pen: Tremayne 57'; Cards: Hughes (yellow card) 15' to 25', Swart (yellow card) 74' to 80'	Report	Try: P. Tanwar 53' c, V. Patil 76' c, N. Khatri 79' m Con: Punia 55' 77' (2/3); Pen: Punia 5' 10'; Cards: S. Shukla (yellow card) 21' to 31', Singh (yellow card) 56' to 66'

Colombo Racecourse, Sri Lanka
Attendance: 1,000
Referee: (Sri Lanka) Ishanka Abeykoon

FB	15	Iliesa Rakabu
RW	14	Frank Hughes
OC	13	Pita Beracibi
IC	12	Johann-Henry Bezuidenhout
LW	11	Beau Swart
FH	10	Brook Tremayne
SH	9	James Phillips
N8	8	Elliot Johnston
OF	7	Guillermo Villegas Bardo
BF	6	Tom Featherstone
RL	5	Darshan Gangineni
LL	4	Ismail El Hatmi
TP	3	Samual Spencer
HK	2	Wade Lotter
LP	1	Nicky Lock
Replacements:
FR	25	Abdulaziz Al-Dosari
FR	17	Joseph de Silva Goonetilleke
FR	18	Hassan Elsabeh
	19	Hendrick Botha
	20	Hamza Saied
	21	Paul Schwartz
	22	Ryan Dodds
	23	John Lee Millar
Coach:
(New Zealand) Fred Moe

FB	15	Ajit Hansdah
RW	14	Abhishek Shukla
OC	13	Javed Hussain
IC	12	Mohit Khatri
LW	11	Vallabh Patil
FH	10	Deepak Punia
SH	9	Prince Khatri
N8	8	Neeraj Khatri
OF	7	Joginder
BF	6	Devendra Padir
RL	5	Hitesh Dagar
LL	4	Shivam Shukla
TP	3	Bhupendra Bokan
HK	2	Bharat Dagar
LP	1	Mannu Tanwar
Replacements:
	16	Suraj Prasad
	17	Harvinder Singh
	18	Pradeep Tanwar
	19	Sanket Patil
	20	Suresh Kumar
	21	Sakti Nag
	22	Sukumar Hembrom
	23	Rajdeep Saha
Coach:
(South Africa) Naas Botha

==== Final ====
4 May 2024
19:00 IST (UTC+05:30)

Sri Lanka	45–7	Kazakhstan
Try: Doray 10' m, Weerathunge 18' m, Nanayakkara 24' c, Ratwatte 31' c, Ekanayake 36' c, Jansen 41' c, S. Silva 75' c Con: Ratwatte 25' 32' 38' 42' (4/6), Sampath 76' (1/1); Cards: de Silva (yellow card) 61' to 71'	Report	Try: Magomedov 57' c Con: Nazhibayev 58' (1/1); Cards: Imam (yellow card) 17' to 27'

Colombo Racecourse, Sri Lanka
Attendance: 20,000
Referee: (United Arab Emirates) James Fairbourne

FB	15	Zubair Doray
RW	14	Dinal Ekanayake
OC	13	Akash Madushanka
IC	12	Tarinda Ratwatte
LW	11	Sachith Silva
FH	10	Thenuka Nanayakkara
SH	9	Heshan Jansen
N8	8	Lasindu Karunathilake
OF	7	Tharindu Chathuranga
BF	6	Adeesha Weerathunge
RL	5	Raveen de Silva
LL	4	Suhiru Anthony
TP	3	Charith Silva
HK	2	Pulasthi Dissanayake
LP	1	Janidu Fernando
Replacements:
	16	Venura Kodagoda
	17	Dushmantha Priyadharshana
	18	Faiz Abdulla
	19	Shashika Fernando
	20	Lahiru Thilakarathne
	21	Kavindu de Costa
	22	Hirantha Perera
	23	Hirusha Sampath
Coach:
(Sri Lanka) Sanath Martis

FB	15	Abdrakhman Nazhibayev
RW	14	Nikita Sitov
OC	13	Alexander Lymar
IC	12	Armanzhan Vassilov
LW	11	Roman Chsherbakov
FH	10	Dauley Akymbekov
SH	9	Alexey Lukmanov
N8	8	Magomedrassul Magomedov
OF	7	Onlassyn Tursunbek
BF	6	Nikita Ivanov
RL	5	Timur Timoshin
LL	4	Timofe Maksimenko
TP	3	Georgiy Litvinov
HK	2	Akhiyat Imam
LP	1	Adam Gadaborshev
Replacements:
	16	Alexander Belashov
	17	Daniil Sumskyi
	18	Damir Kazibekov
	19	Rodion Shipitsin
	20	Yegor Khromov
	21	Danil Tur
	22	Jalil Muradov
	23	Ali Boekeyhan Suerer
Coach:
(Kazakhstan) Timur Mashurov

== Statistics ==
=== Most points ===
As of 3 May 2024

Rank	Name	Team	Points
1	Tarinda Ratwatte	Sri Lanka	28
2	Brook Tremayne	Qatar	18
3	Thenuka Nanayakkara	Sri Lanka	15
3	Abdrakhman Nazhibayev	Kazakhstan	15
3	Deepak Punia	India	15

=== Most tries ===
As of 3 May 2024

Rank	Name	Team	Tries
1	Thenuka Nanayakkara	Sri Lanka	3
2	Tarinda Ratwatte	Sri Lanka	2
2	Pulasthi Dissanayake	Sri Lanka	2
2	Iliesa Rakabu	Qatar	2
2	James Philips	Qatar	2
2	Pradeep Tanwar	India	2
7	20 players tied		1
