= Hyundai Glovis Rugby =

South Korean rugby union club, based in Incheon

Hyundai Glovis
- Full name: Hyundai Glovis Rugby Club
- Union: Korea Rugby Union
- Founded: 2015; 11 years ago
- Location: Incheon, South Korea
- Ground: Namdong Asiad Rugby Stadium (Capacity: 5,078)
- Director of Rugby: Kim Yong Hoe
- Captain: Lee Jin-kyu
- League: Korea Super Rugby League
- 2024: 1st

Official website
- www.glovis.net/Eng/rugby/intro/contentsid/253/index.do

Hyundai Glovis Rugby is a South Korean rugby union team who plays in the Korea Super Rugby League, based in Incheon they are one of the few professional clubs in the nation, they are sponsored by Hyundai Glovis.

== History ==
Formed in 2015 as a replacement for Samsung SDI in the Korea Super Rugby League they were unable to participate in the 2016 season due to the postponement of the league due to financial difficulties. Instead they featured at national sports tournaments, coming second in the National 7s Rugby Tournament 2016 as well as at the National Sports Festival 2016.

They made their Korea Super Rugby League debut in 2017, winning the title in the following season. They went on to win the 2019 and 2020 seasons.

The team has close ties to Japan Rugby League One side Urayasu D-Rocks with Hyundai having two players join on loan from the Japanese giants; backrow Daiki Sato, Brody Macaskill and winger Takehiro Ishikawa.

== Club honours ==
- National Sports Festival
  - Champions: (1) 2023
  - Runners-up: (1) 2016
- National 7s Rugby Tournament
  - Runners-up: (1) 2016
- Korea Super Rugby League
  - Champions: (5) 2018, 2019, 2020, 2023, 2024
  - Runners-up: (2) 2021, 2022

== Club staff ==
Coaching

Role	Name
Manager	(South Korea) Kim Yong Hoe
Assistant Coach	(South Korea) Park Sung Ku
Assistant Coach	(South Korea) Jeong Yeun Chang
