= Samsung SDI =

Energy storage subsidiary of Samsung Group

Samsung SDI Co., Ltd.
- Native name: 삼성SDI 주식회사
- Formerly: Samsung-NEC; Samsung Display Device
- Type: Public
- Traded as: KRX: 006400
- Industry: Electronic components
- Founded: 1970; 56 years ago
- Headquarters: Yongin, South Korea
- Area served: Worldwide
- Key people: Joo Sun Choi (president & CEO)
- Revenue: US$17.24 billion (2023)
- Operating income: US$1.251 billion (2023)
- Net income: US$1.50 billion (2023)
- Total assets: US$34.038 billion (2023)
- Owner: Samsung Electronics (19.58%)
- Website: www.samsungsdi.com

Samsung SDI Co., Ltd. (Korean: 삼성SDI 주식회사) is a battery and electronic materials manufacturer headquartered in Yongin, Gyeonggi-do, South Korea. Samsung SDI operates its business with Energy Solutions and Electronic Materials segment. The Energy Solution segment manufactures rechargeable batteries used for IT device, automotive, and Energy Storage System (ESS) applications, and the Electronic Materials segment produces materials for semiconductors and displays. In the first half of 2022, Samsung SDI is ranked sixth in the world with a market share of 5 percent according to SNE research.

== History ==
Samsung SDI was founded as Samsung-NEC Inc. in 1970, producing vacuum tubes. It expanded into cathode ray tubes by 1975. In 1984, the company name was changed to Samsung Electron Device Inc. and expanded into LCDs two years later. By 1998, the company had developed a cylindrical lithium-ion battery. In 1999, the company's name became Samsung SDI Co., Ltd. Samsung SDI started producing AMOLEDs in 2007.

In 2012, Samsung SDI and several other major companies were fined by the European Commission for price fixing of TV cathode-ray tubes. Samsung SDI merged with Cheil Industries in 2014. In 2015, the company acquired Magna International's battery pack business. In 2022, Samsung SDI started to build a pilot line for solid-state batteries in the South Korean city of Suwon and began its first production from the very line in 2023.

In February 2026, the Hungarian news outlet Telex reported that carcinogenic substances had been detected at more than 500 times the permitted level at the company's battery plant in Göd, and alleged that the company failed to address or disclose the issue. According to Agence France-Presse (AFP), the allegations became public following the leak of a government surveillance report involving the monitoring of Samsung's local executives. Critics cited by Telex and AFP argued that the Hungarian government was reluctant to take measures such as temporarily closing the plant due to potential economic and political consequences. The Supreme Court of Hungary revalidated the plant's environmental certification.

== Partnerships ==
=== Joint Ventures ===
Name	Partner Company	Establishment Date	Dissolution Date	Initial SDI Ownership Share (%)	Initial Investment (USD)	Ref.
SB LiMotive	Bosch	2008	2012	50	500,000,000	
	Sungrow	2015				
StarPlus Energy	Stellantis	2022		51	3,500,000,000	
EcoPro EM	EcoPro	2021				
Synergy Cells	General Motors	2024	2026	50.01	3,500,000,000	

=== Supply Agreements ===
As of 2024, Samsung SDI had become a supplier to Audi.

Client	Agreement Date	Supply Start Date	Original Contract End Point	Termination Date	Ref.
BMW	2016		10 years		
Lucid Motors	2016				
BMW	2019	2021	2031		
Hyundai Motor Company	2023	2026	2032		
Mercedes-Benz	2026				

== Corporate governance ==
As of 30 June 2023.

Shareholder	Stake (%)	Flag
Samsung Electronics	19.58%	South Korea
National Pension Service	7.47%	South Korea
BlackRock	5.01%	United States
Samsung Foundation of Culture	0.58%	South Korea
Samsung Welfare Foundation	0.25%	South Korea

== Plants ==
As of October 2023, the company operates two battery cell plants in South Korea and four overseas battery cell plants in the United States, China, Hungary and Malaysia.

== Rugby Union ==
Samsung SDI
- Full name: Samsung SDI
- Union: Korea Rugby Union
- Founded: 2003; 23 years ago
- Disbanded: 2015; 11 years ago
- League: Korea Spring League

Samsung SDI's rugby union team played in the Korea Rugby League, the top division in Korea, from its formation in 2003 to 2014. It won the championship 4 times.

=== Honors ===
- Korea Rugby League
  - Champions: (4) 2003, 2004, 2008, 2012

=== Notable Former Players ===
==== Internationals ====
- (South Korea) Lee Myung-geun
- (South Korea) Tae Il Yoon
- (South Korea) Kim Young Geun
- (South Korea) Jung Sung Kyun
- (South Korea) Lee Gye Deok
- (South Korea) Chul Woong Kwak
- (South Korea) Kim Nam Young
- (South Korea) Kim Soon Eun
- (South Korea) Park Chan Min
- (South Korea) Kwan Jung Hyuk

== See also ==
- SB LiMotive
- List of electric-vehicle-battery manufacturers
- Samsung
- Samsung Electronics
- Battery industry of South Korea
- Manufacturing in South Korea
