= Korea Super Rugby League =

Highest rugby union competition in South Korea

- Current season 2024 Korea Super Rugby League
- Sport: Rugby union
- Formerly known as: Korea Rugby League (2003–2008) (2018-2021); Korea Spring League (2008-2018)
- Inaugural season: 2003
- Number of teams: 4
- Country: South Korea
- Champions: Hyundai Glovis (2024)
- Most titles: KEPCO Rugby (6 titles)
- Website: Korea Rugby Union

The Korea Super Rugby league (Korean: 코리아 슈퍼럭비리그, formally the Korea Rugby League and Korea Spring League) was a semi professional rugby union league based in South Korea. It is run by the Korean Rugby Union.

== History ==
In 2003 with Japan, South Koreas creates rival, having a much larger player pool and the possible liquidation on Koreas largest club, KEPCO, the South Korean rugby federation decides to merge the corporation and university championships to form a single league: The Korea Rugby League. The announcement was made on the 29th of April 2003 with the championship launching in May that year. With 7 teams with a single round robin format Samsung SDI became inaugural champions of the Korea Rugby League.

In 2008 the Korea Rugby League merged with the National Spring League, to for the Korea Spring League. Unfortunately in 2010 Daesim rugby (joined in 2007) filed for bankruptcy causing them to leave the league, POSCO Rugby (formally Pohang Steel) replaced them as the 4th team in the 2010 season.

In January 2015, Samsung SDI decided to dissolve its rugby team after record losses from the parent company. Samsung SDI was the backbone of South Korea's national team and was composed of many professional players.

The club had an annual budget of 1.5 million euros. Its loss caused great difficulty for South Korean rugby, which was then on the verge of disappearance. In December 2015 there was the launch of the Hyundai Glovis. The latter will primarily recruit many players from the missing Samsung SDI rugby team. However it was not enough and the league was suspended for 2 years.

The championship returned three years later in 2017 with three teams: KEPCO, POSCO and Hyundai Glovis. KEPCO won its 4th title, the 3rd consecutive. From 2018, the championship was renamed once again the Korea Rugby League.

From 2020, South Korean rugby is hit like all of Asia by the COVID-19 pandemic. The Korea Rugby League will be reduced to two games, a semi final and a final since POSCO was forced to forfeit. Hyundai Glovis won its 3rd title.

In 2021 Korean Rugby Union President Choi Yoon decides to create a new league: The Korea Super Rugby League.

The season takes place over six days, with each club playing six games (regular round trip phase). The numbers of the teams increase to at least 30 players (with the reinforcement of university players) to ensure the smooth running of the championship.

The new league will also be able to rely on the mass return from Japan of South Korean internationals such as Na Kwan Young and Chang Yong Heung who signed for KEPCO.

President Choi Yoon announced that the Korea Rugby Union, now with a large budget thanks to nearly 30 major sponsors of major national companies, will issue the package financially in 2023.

=== Season overview ===
Year	Champions	Teams	
2003	Samsung SDI(1)	Samsung SDI, Pohang Steel, KAFAC, Korea University, Yonsei University, Kyung Hee University and Dankook University	
2004	Samsung SDI(2)	Samsung SDI, Pohang Steel, KAFAC, Korea University, Yonsei University, Kyung Hee University and Dankook University	
2005	KAFAC (1)	Samsung SDI, Pohang Steel, KAFAC, KEPCO, Korea University, Yonsei University, Kyung Hee University and Dankook University	
2006	Tournament not played, to allow the national team to focus on 2007 RWC qualification.		
2007	KAFAC (2)	(Pool A) Daesim, Korea University and Yonsei University	(Pool B) KAFAC, Dankook University and Kyung Hee University
2008	Samsung SDI(3)	KAFAC, Samsung SDI, KEPCO, Pohang Steel and Daesim	
2009	KEPCO (1)	KAFAC, KEPCO and Daesim	
2010	POSCO (2)	KAFAC, KEPCO, POSCO and Samsung SDI	
2011	POSCO (2)	KAFAC, KEPCO, POSCO and Samsung SDI	
2012	Samsung SDI(4)	Incheon City Sports Association, KAFAC, KEPCO, POSCO and Samsung SDI	
2013	KEPCO (2)	Samsung SDI, KEPCO and POSCO	
2014	KEPCO (3)	Samsung SDI, KEPCO and POSCO	
2015	Tournament not held, due to financial difficulties		
2016	Tournament not held, due to financial difficulties		
2017	KEPCO (4)	Hyundai Glovis, KEPCO and POSCO	
2018	Hyundai Glovis (1)	KEPCO, Hyundai Glovis, KAFAC and POSCO	
2018	KEPCO (5)	KEPCO, Hyundai Glovis, KAFAC and POSCO	
2018	KAFAC (3)	KEPCO, Hyundai Glovis, KAFAC and POSCO	
2019	Hyundai Glovis (2)	KEPCO, Hyundai Glovis, KAFAC and POSCO	
2019	POSCO (3)	KEPCO, Hyundai Glovis, KAFAC and POSCO	
2020	Hyundai Glovis (3)	KEPCO, Hyundai Glovis and KAFAC	
2021	POSCO (4)	KEPCO, Hyundai Glovis and POSCO	
2022	KEPCO (6)	KEPCO, Hyundai Glovis, POSCO and KAFAC	
2023	Hyundai Glovis (4)	POSCO, OK Financial Group Okman, KEPCO, Hyundai Glovis	
2023	KEPCO (7)	Korea University, OK Financial Group Okman, KAFAC, Hyundai Glovis	
2024	Hyundai Glovis (5)	Korea University, OK Financial Group Okman, KAFAC, Hyundai Glovis	

== Clubs ==
=== Current clubs ===
Locations of current Korea Super Rugby League Rugby Teams

Club	Established	Joined	City	Stadium	Capacity	Titles (Last)
Hyundai Glovis	2015	2017	Incheon	Incheon Namdong Asiad Rugby Field	5,078	5 (2024)
Ok Financial Group Okman	2023	2023	Gwangju			0
KAFAC	1984	2003	Mungyeon	KAFAC Sports Compex	10,000	2 (2007)
Korea University	1929	2003	Seoul			0

- Note: Capacity listed for rugby union games may differ from official stadium capacity

=== All time ===
A total of 12 clubs have been involved in the top-flight since the league's inception in the 2003 season. The most recent club to make its debut in the competition was OK Financial Group Okman, which made their top flight debut in 2023.

Below, the 2024 clubs are listed in bold; ever-present clubs are listed in bold italics.

Seasons	Team	Dates
3	Daesim	2007–2009
4	Dankook University	2003–2007
**8**	**Hyundai Glovis**	**2017–2024**
1	Incheon Sports Association	2012
**12**	**KAFAC**	**2003–2011, 2018–2020, 2022–2024**
14	KEPCO	2008–2023
**6**	**Korea University**	**2003–2007, 2023–2024**
4	Kyung Hee University	2003–2007
**2**	**OK Financial Group Okman**	**2023–2024**
15	POSCO	2003–2005, 2008, 2010–2019, 2021–2023
9	Samsung SDI	2003–2005, 2008, 2010–2014
4	Yonsei University	2003–2007
