= Korea Armed Forces Athletic Corps =

KAFAC's emblem

Korea Armed Forces Athletic Corps (Korean: 국군체육부대), commonly known as the Sangmu (상무), is the sports division of the Republic of Korea Armed Forces. Its headquarters are located in Mungyeong, Gyeongsangbuk-do. It was founded in 1984 by the integration of the athletic teams of ROK Army, ROK Navy and ROK Air Force.

== Composition ==
=== First Athletic Unit ===
- Football — Gimcheon Sangmu FC take part in K League
- Basketball — Sangmu Basketball Team take part in Korean Basketball League's Reserve League
- Handball — Sangmu Phoenix take part in Handball Korea League
- Rugby - take part in the Korea Super Rugby League
- Boxing
- Judo
- Wrestling

=== Second Athletic Unit ===
- Baseball — Sangmu Baseball Team take part in Futures League (Korea Professional Baseball's Reserve League)
- Volleyball — Sangmu Volleyball Team took part in V-League
- Badminton
- Tennis
- Field hockey
- Gymnastics
- Weightlifting
- Table tennis

=== Third Athletic Unit ===
- Women's football — Mungyeong Sangmu WFC take part in WK-League
- Taekwondo
- Shooting
- Aquatics
- Archery
- Fencing
- Athletics
- Cycling
- Biathlon
- Modern pentathlon

== Achievements ==
Military World Games

Venue	Gold	Silver	Bronze	Total
(Italy) 1995 Rome	1	5	4	10
(Croatia) 1999 Zagreb	10	4	4	18
(Italy) 2003 Catania	5	4	5	14
(India) 2007 Hyderabad	2	4	7	13
(Brazil) 2011 Rio de Janeiro	8	6	8	22
(South Korea) 2015 Mungyeong	19	15	25	59
(China) 2019 Wuhan	3	10	11	24

Korea Rugby League

2005, 2007 Champions

== Role in professional sports ==
Besides providing athletic training and facilities to serving active-duty military personnel, Sangmu also accepts qualified male professional athletes serving their mandatory military service. Athletes from team sports play for the Sangmu teams on loan from their parent club and return to their respective clubs at the end of their service. Serving Sangmu athletes may be temporarily released to participate in international competitions if called up by their respective sporting associations.

Applicants submit the appropriate documents towards the end of their playing season, which differs depending on the sport, and accepted applicants are further screened through a series of physical fitness tests and a written test. Athletes from team sports are also chosen based on availability of places in the team for the upcoming season and their records. Those rejected may either re-apply (if not of maximum age yet) or serve as a regular soldier. Qualified applicants undergo five weeks of basic military training like all other recruits before being assigned to their respective athletic units. Due to their military status, Sangmu athletes are required to salute when the national anthem is played and are referred to as their rank instead of the honorific for athletes (seonsu, 선수) even at international competitions and tournaments.

The existing policy dictates that athletes who have not completed their service and win a gold medal at the Asian Games or at least a bronze medal at the Olympics may be exempted, although they still have to undergo basic training. If the athlete is already serving, he may be granted an early discharge, as in the case of basketball player Oh Se-keun and fencer Kim Jun-ho, both of whom were discharged weeks after winning their respective medals. Due to this policy, the topic of mandatory military service and exemptions garners increased public interest during the Olympics and Asian Games.

== Rugby Union team ==
KAFAC
- Full name: Korea Armed Forces Athletic Corps Rugby
- Union: Korea Rugby Union
- Nickname: Sangmu
- Founded: 1984; 42 years ago
- Location: Mungyeong, North Gyeongsang Province, South Korea
- Coach: Seo Cheon-oh
- League: Korea Super Rugby League
- 2024: 4th

Founded in 1984 the KAFAC rugby union team plays in the Korea Super Rugby League, having won the tournament twice in 2005 and 2007. They are coached by Seo Cheon-oh and are based in Mungyeong.

The current squad is,
**Props**: Kim Jeong-hwan; Kwak Seong-jun; Lee Jun-woo; Lee Kwan-woo; **Shin Gi-soo**; Woo Il-kwon; Kim Min-seok; **Seo Tae-pung**; **Kim Tae-woo**; **Hookers**: Park Tae-ho; Park Jae-min; Shin Dong-rip; **Choi Ho-young**; **Locks**: Kim Jin-hwan; Yu Gi-han; Lee Hyun-jun; Kyung Je-sung; **Seo Jong-soo**	**Back Rows**: Kang Ho-bin; Park Joon-young; Kim Hae-yong; Yu Gi-jung; Yoon Jong-ok; Jeong Jong-taek; Yoon Young-hoon; Lee Seung-hwan; Kwon Jae-hyeok; Moon Seong-hwan; Lee Young-min; Lim Seong-soo; **Scrum Halves**: **Ahn Sang-hyun**; **Kim Seong-hyeon**; Moon Tae-hoon; **Kim Wan-seok**; Choi Hyeong-tak; **Fly Halves**: Kim Chan-seop; Kim Chan-deul; Jang Jun-beom	**Centres**: Shin Hyun-min; Bang Joon-young; Son Min-gi; Kim Min-wook; Yoon Young-hoon; Oh Moon-seong; Yoon Yeong-min; **Wingers**: **Hong Sung-jong**; Choi Dong-wan; Kim Tae-hyung; Kim Seong-ho; Kim Hyun-young; Kim Chan-sun; **Kim Eui-tae**; **Fullbacks**: Jeong Ho-chang; Kim Jae-won
(Players in bold have played internationally)
