= Sri Lanka at the 2018 Asian Games =

- IOC code: SRI
- NOC: National Olympic Committee of Sri Lanka

in Jakarta & Palembang, Indonesia 18 August – 2 September
- Competitors: 173 in 28 sports
- Flag bearer: Dinusha Gomes (opening)
- Medals: Gold 0 Silver 0 Bronze 0 Total 0

Asian Games appearances (overview)
- 1951; 1954; 1958; 1962; 1966; 1970; 1974; 1978; 1982; 1986; 1990; 1994; 1998; 2002; 2006; 2010; 2014; 2018; 2022; 2026

Sri Lanka participated at the 2018 Asian Games in Jakarta and Palembang, Indonesia from 18 August to 2 September 2018.

The Sri Lankan team was scheduled to consist of 185 athletes (138 men and 47 women), marking the large contingent the country has sent to a single edition of the Asian Games. The Sri Lankan team will compete in 28 sports, marking its debut in the sports of baseball, canoeing, roller sports and triathlon. Approximately, 60 officials and coaches were also a part of the contingent, making the total team size 245. However, the athletics team was cut to 14 athletes (from 25), making the team size 174 (128 men and 46 women), which would still make this the biggest team the country has sent to the games. Further changes made the final team size at 173 athletes (131 men and 42 women). Sri Lanka will also have an athlete competing in the demonstration event of esports.

On August 17, 2018, weightlifter Dinusha Gomes was announced as the country's flag bearer at the opening ceremony.

The National Shooting Sports Federation of Sri Lanka declined to enter any athletes for the games because the National Olympic Committee of Sri Lanka refused a request for a coach to go with the team.

Sri Lanka failed to win a medal, being jointly ranked with eight other countries for last place. The country's highest placement was two fourth-place finishes for the men's 4 × 400 m track and field relay team and the men's rugby sevens team.

== Competitors ==
The following is the list of number of competitors participating at the Games per sport/discipline.

Sport	Men	Women	Total
Archery	1	0	1
Athletics	7	5	12
Badminton	4	2	6
Baseball	18	0	18
Basketball	4	4	8
Beach volleyball	2	0	2
Boxing	3	3	6
Canoeing	1	0	1
Field hockey	18	0	18
Golf	4	0	4
Gymnastics	0	1	1
Judo	2	0	2
Kabaddi	12	12	24
Karate	4	2	6
Roller sports	2	2	4
Rowing	4	0	4
Rugby sevens	12	0	12
Sailing	1	0	1
Squash	2	2	4
Swimming	5	0	5
Table tennis	1	1	2
Taekwondo	3	3	6
Tennis	2	2	4
Triathlon	1	0	1
Volleyball	14	0	14
Weightlifting	2	2	4
Wrestling	1	0	1
Wushu	1	1	2
Total	131	42	173

== Archery ==
Sri Lanka originally had five archers (three men and two women), who met the qualification standards. However, the Sri Lankan Olympic Committee approved only one male archer.

Men

Athlete	Event	Ranking round		Round of 64	Round of 32	Round of 16	Quarterfinals	Semifinals	Final / BM	
Athlete	Event	Score	Seed	Opposition Score	Opposition Score	Opposition Score	Opposition Score	Opposition Score	Opposition Score	Rank
Sajeev De Silva	Individual recurve	613	64	Roshan Nagarkoti (NEP); W 6–0	Wei Chun-heng (TPE); L 2–6	did not advance				

== Athletics ==
Sri Lanka originally entered a team of 25 athletes (18 men and seven women), however the team would only be finalized after the National Championships, held in Colombo from August 3 to 5, 2018. Two athletes were given exceptions to the trials as they were training overseas: Indunil Herath and Hiruni Wijayaratne. The final team consisted of 14 athletes. The team was later reduced to 12 athletes (seven men and five women), after the entries of Ushan Thiwanka and Upamali Ratnakumari were rejected by organizers due to the national organization forgetting to enter their names on time. The track and field team failed to win a medal for the third straight Asian Games. The top placing performance was fourth by the men's 4 × 400 m relay team who finished with a time that was off the Sri Lankan record by 0.03 seconds.

Men
Track & road events

Athlete	Event	Heats		Semifinals		Final	
Athlete	Event	Result	Rank	Result	Rank	Result	Rank
Aruna Darshana	400 m	46.97	1 Q	46.53	3	did not advance	
Kalinga Kumarage	400 m	45.99 PB	3 Q	46.21	3 q	46.49	8
Indunil Herath	800 m	1:47.54	3 q	—N/a		1:51.36	8
Aruna Darshana; Kalinga Kumarage; Ajith Premakumara; Pasindu Kodikara; Dilip Ruwan	4 × 400 m relay	3:06.66	3 Q	—N/a		3:02.74	4

- Ruwan was the reserve and did not compete in the heats or final.

Field events

Athlete	Event	Qualification		Final	
Athlete	Event	Distance	Rank	Distance	Rank
Janaka Prasad Wimalasiri	Long jump	7.56	11 q	7.86	7

Women
Track & road events

Athlete	Event	Heats		Semifinals		Final	
Athlete	Event	Result	Rank	Result	Rank	Result	Rank
Rumeshika Rathnayake	200 m	23.79	3 Q	24.05	6	did not advance	
Gayanthika Abeyratne	800 m	2:06.31	3 q	—N/a		2:05.50	6
Nimali Liyanarachchi	800 m	2:06.74	4	—N/a		did not advance	
Hiruni Wijayaratne	10,000m	—N/a				DNF	
Nilani Rathnayaka	3000 m steeplechase	—N/a				9:54.65	6

== Badminton ==
Sri Lanka entered six badminton athletes (four men and two women). The team's best performance was a quarterfinals finish by the men's doubles pairs team of Sachin Dias and Buwaneka Goonethilleka.

Singles

Athlete	Event	Round of 64	Round of 32	Round of 16	Quarterfinals	Semifinals	Final	Rank
Athlete	Event	Opposition Score	Opposition Score	Opposition Score	Opposition Score	Opposition Score	Opposition Score	Rank
Dinuka Karunaratne	Men's	Bye	Pui (MAC); W 2–0 (21–14, 21–15)	Ng (HKG); L 0–2 (6–21, 14–21)	did not advance			
Niluka Karunaratne	Men's	Bye	Phetpradab (THA); L 0–2 (12–21, 12–21)	did not advance				
Thilini Hendahewa	Women's	—N/a	Fitriani (INA); L 0–2 (6–21, 4–21)	did not advance				
Kavidi Sirimannage	Women's	—N/a	Almutairi (KSA); W 2–0 (21–4, 21–4)	Jindapol (THA); L 0–2 (4–21, 14–21)	did not advance			

Doubles

Athlete	Event	Round of 32	Round of 16	Quarterfinals	Semifinals	Final	Rank
Athlete	Event	Opposition Score	Opposition Score	Opposition Score	Opposition Score	Opposition Score	Rank
Sachin Dias; Buwaneka Goonethilleka	Men's	Che / Pui (MAC); W 2–0 (21–11, 21–8)	Azam / Ali (PAK); W 2–0 (21–12, 21–13)	Li / Liu (CHN); L 0–2 (12–21, 15–21)	did not advance		
Dinuka Karunaratne; Niluka Karunaratne	Men's	Choi / Kang (KOR); L 0–2 (16–21, 16–21)	did not advance				
Thilini Hendahewa; Kavidi Sirimannage	Women's	Tang / Zheng (CHN); L 0–2 (13–21, 12–21)	did not advance				
Sachin Dias; Thilini Hendahewa	Mixed	Do / Pham (VIE); L 1–2 (21–13, 12–21, 13–21)	did not advance				

== Baseball ==
Sri Lanka made its Asian Games debut in the sport of baseball. The team first competed in the a preliminary qualification group to qualify to compete in group A. Sri Lanka's baseball squad consisted of 18 athletes. Sri Lanka won its debut match by beat Laos 15 to 10. However, a loss to Thailand the next day meant the team was eliminated.

Summary

Team	Event	Round 1		Round 2		Super / Consolation		Final / BM	
Team	Event	Oppositions Scores	Rank	Oppositions Scores	Rank	Oppositions Scores	Rank	Opposition Score	Rank
Sri Lanka men's	Men's tournament	Laos: W 15–10; Sri Lanka: L 3–14 (F/7)	2	did not advance					9

Roster

Sri Lanka announced their squad on August 6, 2018. The team consists of 18 athletes. The position of the player is listed in parentheses.

- Akalanka Ranasinghe (OF)
- Sameera Rathnayake (OF)
- Saliya Wijesinghe (OF)
- Tharindu Madumal (P)
- Sanjeewa Jayarathne (P)
- Shasika Dulshan (P)
- Chirath Karunarathne (P)
- Chamika Yasas (P)
- Nelanka Karunarathna (C)
- Isara Gunasiri (C)
- Amila Pushpa Kumara (OF)
- Naween Anuradha (P)
- Sanjeewa Manna (INF)
- Sandun Madushanka (INF)
- Krishna Hapuarachchi (INF)
- Sahan Avishka (INF)
- Iresh Kosala (C)
- Kaushala Prabuddha (OF)

Legend
C = Catcher
INF = Infielder
OF = Outfielder
P = Pitcher

Round 1

Pos	Team	Pld	W	L	RF	RA	PCT	GB	Qualification
1	Thailand	2	2	0	29	3	1.000	—	Preliminary
2	Sri Lanka	2	1	1	18	24	.500	1	
3	Laos	2	0	2	10	30	.000	2	

Source: OCA

22 August; 14:00	Laos	10–15	Sri Lanka	Gelora Bung Karno Baseball Field, Jakarta; Attendance: 400; Umpires: Yang Jae-man (KOR)
22 August; 14:00	LP: Cola Phouangkeo		WP: Chirath Karunarathne	Gelora Bung Karno Baseball Field, Jakarta; Attendance: 400; Umpires: Yang Jae-man (KOR)
22 August; 14:00	HR: Nalor Gniatou (1)			Gelora Bung Karno Baseball Field, Jakarta; Attendance: 400; Umpires: Yang Jae-man (KOR)

Team	1	2	3	4	5	6	7	8	9	R	H	E
Sri Lanka	4	1	0	1	5	0	0	1	3	15	16	1
Laos	2	2	0	0	1	3	2	0	0	10	13	3

23 August; 14:00	Sri Lanka	3–14 (F/7)	Thailand	Gelora Bung Karno Baseball Field, Jakarta; Attendance: 150; Umpires: Yoshinori Koide (JPN)
23 August; 14:00	LP: Sanjeewa Jayarathne		WP: Kevin Irwin	Gelora Bung Karno Baseball Field, Jakarta; Attendance: 150; Umpires: Yoshinori Koide (JPN)

Team	1	2	3	4	5	6	7	8	9	R	H	E
Thailand	1	6	0	1	0	5	1	—	—	14	21	1
Sri Lanka	0	1	0	1	1	0	0	—	—	3	9	2

== Basketball ==
Sri Lanka entered both a men's and women's 3-on-3 teams. Each team consisted of four athletes.

=== Men's 3-on-3 tournament ===
Roster

- Sinna Fernando
- Pawan Gamage
- Arnold Thevakumar
- Kisal Wijewarnasooriya

Pos	Team	Pld	W	L	PF	PA	PD	Qualification
1	China	4	4	0	86	49	+37	Quarterfinals
2	Thailand	4	3	1	74	53	+21	Quarterfinals
3	Indonesia	4	2	2	67	59	+8	
4	Sri Lanka	4	1	3	57	66	−9	
5	Vietnam	4	0	4	28	85	−57	

Source: OCA

21 August
15:00

China	21–14	Sri Lanka
Pts: Zeng 9		Pts: Brent 6

Gelora Bung Karno Tennis Center Court, Jakarta
Referees: Ito (JPN), Rulyov (KAZ)

21 August
16:00

Thailand	20–10	Sri Lanka
Pts: Jakrawan, Chungyampin 8		Pts: Brent 4

Gelora Bung Karno Tennis Center Court, Jakarta
Referees: Tan (SGP), Ito (JPN)

24 August
17:50

Sri Lanka	21–7	Vietnam
Pts: Brent 20		Pts: Triệu 4

Gelora Bung Karno Tennis Center Court, Jakarta
Referees: Ibragimow (TKM), Al-Harthi (OMA)

24 August
19:20

Sri Lanka	12–18	Indonesia
Pts: Brent 7		Pts: Goantara 6

Gelora Bung Karno Tennis Center Court, Jakarta
Referees: Tan (SGP), Rulyov (KAZ)

=== Women's 3-on-3 tournament ===
Roster

- Imesha Durage
- Fathima Moreseth
- Anne Ravindran
- Rashmi Don

Pos	Team	Pld	W	L	PF	PA	PD	Qualification
1	South Korea	3	3	0	59	32	+27	Quarterfinals
2	Indonesia	3	2	1	46	46	0	Quarterfinals
3	Sri Lanka	3	1	2	32	54	−22	
4	Syria	3	0	3	42	47	−5	

Source: OCA

22 August
21:10

Sri Lanka	9–21	Indonesia
Pts: Perera, Thathsarani 3		Pts: Febiananda 7

Gelora Bung Karno Tennis Center Court, Jakarta
Referees: Shi (CHN), Ho (HKG)

25 August
15:40

South Korea	21–8	Sri Lanka
Pts: Kim J.Y. 10		Pts: Perera 5

Gelora Bung Karno Tennis Center Court, Jakarta
Referees: Shi (CHN), Ito (JPN)

25 August
16:50

Sri Lanka	15–12	Syria
Pts: Thathsarani 6		Pts: Bshara 7

Gelora Bung Karno Tennis Center Court, Jakarta
Referees: Shi (CHN), Tan (SGP)

== Beach volleyball ==
Sri Lanka entered one male beach volleyball pair. The pair won one match and lost two, placing them third in the group. With that result, the pair did not advance out of their group.

Athlete	Event	Preliminary round	Standing	Round of 16	Quarterfinals	Semifinals	Final / BM	
Athlete	Event	Opposition Score	Standing	Opposition Score	Opposition Score	Opposition Score	Opposition Score	Rank
Asanka Pradeep; Sashimal Yapa	Men's	Pool B Yakovlev – Bogatu (KAZ); L 0–2 (21–23, 11–21); Junyoung – Hongchan (KOR); W 2–0 (21–15, 21–10); Janko – Samba (QAT); L 0–2 (12–21, 11–21)	3	did not advance				

== Boxing ==
Sri Lanka's boxing team consisted of six athletes (three men and three women).

Athlete	Event	Round of 32	Round of 16	Quarterfinals	Semifinals	Final	Rank
Athlete	Event	Opposition Result	Opposition Result	Opposition Result	Opposition Result	Opposition Result	Rank
Thiwanka Ranasinghe	Men's −49 kg	Mario Blasius Kali (INA); L 0–5	did not advance				
Vidanalange Bandara	Men's −52 kg	Bye	Yuttapong Tongdee (THA); L RSC	did not advance			
Dinindu Saparamadu	Men's −64 kg	Bakhodur Usmonov (TJK); L RSC	did not advance				
Anusha Koddithuwakku	Women's −51 kg	Bye	Wada Madoka (JPN); L 1–4	did not advance			
Keshani Hansika	Women's −57 kg	—N/a	Saniya Sultankyzy (KAZ); L 0–5	did not advance			
Krishmi Dharmathilake	Women's −60 kg	—N/a	Shoira Zulkaynarova (TJK); L 0–5	did not advance			

== Canoeing ==
Sri Lanka entered one male kayaker.

=== Sprint ===
Men

Athletes	Event	Heats		Semifinals		Final	
Athletes	Event	Time	Rank	Time	Rank	Time	Rank
Ranhoti Wijerathne	K-1 200 metres	45.121	6 SF	41.821	8	did not advance	

Qualification Legend: FA=Final A; SF=Semifinals

- Results given are within the heat.

== Field hockey ==
Sri Lanka qualified a men's field hockey team after winning the bronze medal at the qualifying tournament in Muscat, Oman. With the win against Hong Kong, the Sri Lankan men's field hockey team won its first game in 40 years at the Asian Games. The win in 1978 also came against Hong Kong. The Sri Lankan team finished in eighth place, after losing the 7th place match to Oman.

=== Men's tournament ===
Roster

The following is the Sri Lanka roster in the men's field hockey tournament at the 2018 Asian Games. The team consists of 18 athletes.

1. Chamilka Mahabaduge (GK)
2. Dhammika Ranasingha
3. Ishanka Doranegala (C)
4. Pushpa Hendeniya
6. Harindra Dharmarathna
7. Tharanga Gunawardana
9. Sanjeewe Malegodagamage
10. Vipul Warnakula
11. Sandaruwan Sudusinghe
12. Nalantha Karunamunige
13. Rajitha Kulathunga
15. Gihan Rathnayake
17. Ravidu Bothale
20. Pramudya Fernando
22. Dinesh Don Abraham
23. Lahiru Panthie
29. Tharindu Hendeniya (GK)
30. Anuradha Rathnayake

Pool A

Pos	Team	Pld	W	D	L	PF	PA	PD	Pts	Qualification
1	India	5	5	0	0	76	3	+73	15	Semi-finals
2	Japan	5	4	0	1	30	11	+19	12	Semi-finals
3	South Korea	5	3	0	2	39	8	+31	9	Fifth place game
4	Sri Lanka	5	2	0	3	7	41	−34	6	Seventh place game
5	Indonesia (H)	5	1	0	4	5	40	−35	3	Ninth place game
6	Hong Kong	5	0	0	5	3	57	−54	0	Eleventh place game

Source: FIH
Rules for classification: 1) points; 2) goal difference; 3) goals scored; 4) head-to-head result.
(H) Hosts

20 August 2018
14:00

Japan	11–0	Sri Lanka
Zendana 2'; Ke. Tanaka 9', 19'; Yamashita 11'; Yamasaki 13', 28'; Mitani 14'; Murata 32', 34', 54'; Kirishita 52'	Report

Umpires:
Gareth Greenfield (NZL)
Salim Lucky (BAN)

22 August 2018
12:00

South Korea	8–0	Sri Lanka
Kim Se. 5'; Kim J. 7'; Hwang W. 9'; Bae J. 14'; Jang 32', 42', 44'; Hwang T. 52'	Report

Umpires:
You Suolong (CHN)
Saleh Al-Balushi (OMA)

24 August 2018
18:00

Sri Lanka	4–1	Hong Kong
Kulathunga 7'; Rathnayake 26'; Sudusinghe 51'; Gedara 55'	Report	Iu 54'

Umpires:
Salim Lucky (BAN)
Saleh Al-Balushi (OMA)

26 August 2018
10:00

Sri Lanka	3–1	Indonesia
Sudusinghe 24'; Ranasinghe 42', 54'	Report	Hakim 38'

Umpires:
Ilanggo Kanabathu (MAS)
Salim Lucky (BAN)

28 August 2018
16:00

India	20–0	Sri Lanka
Rupinder 2', 52', 53'; Harmanpreet 6', 22', 33'; Akashdeep 10', 11', 18', 23', 33', 43'; Prasad 32'; Mandeep 36', 44', 59'; Amit 38'; Dipreet 53'; Lalit 58', 59'	Report

Umpires:
Ilanggo Kanabathu (MAS)
Saleh Al-Balushi (OMA)

Seventh place match

30 August 2018
15:00

Sri Lanka	2–5	Oman
Sudusinghe 14'; Rathnayake 55'	Report	M. Al-Hasani 5'; Al-Fazari 23', 40'; Al-Shibli 29'; Shamaiaa 44'

Umpires:
Gus Soteriades (USA)
Narongtuch Subboonsung (THA)

Summary

Team	Event	Group Stage						Seventh place match	
Team	Event	Opposition Score	Opposition Score	Opposition Score	Opposition Score	Opposition Score	Rank	Opposition Score	Rank
Sri Lanka men's	Men's tournament	Japan; L 0–11	South Korea; L 0–8	Hong Kong; W 1–4	Indonesia; W 1–3	India; L 0–20	4	Oman; L 2–5	8

== Golf ==
Sri Lanka entered four male golfers. Before the competition began, 20 teams put in complaints to the Court of Arbitration for Sport, disputing the eligibility of three of the golfers: Mithun Perera, Nadaraja Thangarajah and Anura Rohana. The event is open to amateurs, and all three were considered professionals. The Court of Arbitration for Sport ruled against excluding them from the games. However, the team went ahead and still replaced the three golfers. All three were replaced with Joseph De Soysa, Sachin De Silva, and Kumara Patrick.

Men

Athlete(s)	Event	Final					
Athlete(s)	Event	Round 1	Round 2	Round 3	Round 4	Total	Rank
Sachin De Silva	Individual	74	82	84	83	323 (+35)	=72
Joseph De Soysa	Individual	79	73	76	73	301 (+13)	=41
Lalith Kumara	Individual	did not start					
Kumara George Patrick	Individual	73	77	79	77	306 (+18)	=47
Sachin De Silva; Joseph De Soysa; Kumara Patrick	Team	226	232	239	233	930 (+66)	15

== Gymnastics ==
=== Rhythmic ===
Sri Lanka entered one rhythmic gymnast.

Individual Qualification

Athlete	Event	Apparatus				Total	Rank
Athlete	Event	Hoop	Ball	Clubs	Ribbon	Total	Rank
Anna-Marie Ondaatje	Qualification	11.45	12.45	11.70	10.35	35.600	24 Q

- For qualification, the top three of four scores counted towards a gymnast's total.

Individual final

Athlete	Event	Apparatus				Total	Rank
Athlete	Event	Hoop	Ball	Clubs	Ribbon	Total	Rank
Anna-Marie Ondaatje	Qualification	did not start					

== Judo ==
Sri Lanka entered two male judokas.

Men

Athlete	Event	Round of 32	Round of 16	Quarterfinals	Semifinals	Final	Rank
Athlete	Event	Opposition Result	Opposition Result	Opposition Result	Opposition Result	Opposition Result	Rank
Chamara Repiyallage	−73 kg	Bektur Rysmambetov (KGZ); L 1s1–10	did not advance				
Rajitha Pushpakumara	−81 kg	Harshdeep Brar (IND); L 0s1–10	did not advance				

== Kabaddi ==
Sri Lanka entered a men's and women's team of 12 athletes each (24 total). The women's team will participate for the first time ever. The president of the Sri Lankan Kabaddi federation, Anura Pathirana, resigned after both teams failed to win a medal.

Summary

Team	Event	Group Stage					Semifinal	Final	
Team	Event	Opposition Score	Opposition Score	Opposition Score	Opposition Score	Rank	Opposition Score	Opposition Score	Rank
Sri Lanka men's	Men	India; L 28−44	Thailand; W 46−29	Bangladesh; L 25−29	South Korea; L 22−33	4	did not advance		7
Sri Lanka women's	Women	Thailand; L 15−41	Indonesia; W 34−17	Japan; W 22−17	India; L 12−38	3	did not advance		5

=== Men's tournament ===
The men's team consisted of 12 athletes.

Roster

- Chamara Haputhanthri
- Milinda Chathuranga
- Sajith Indrakumara
- Chaminda Samarakoon
- Lahiru Kuruppu
- Lahiru Sampath
- Dilan Sanjaya
- Rathnapala
- Asiri Sadaruwan
- Aslam Sajah
- Pushpakumara
- Nishantha Gunawardhana

Pool A

Pos	Team	Pld	W	D	L	PF	PA	PD	Pts	Qualification
1	South Korea	4	4	0	0	147	84	+63	8	Semifinals
2	India	4	3	0	1	166	103	+63	6	Semifinals
3	Bangladesh	4	2	0	2	102	135	−33	4	
4	Sri Lanka	4	1	0	3	121	135	−14	2	
5	Thailand	4	0	0	4	102	181	−79	0	

Source: OCA

19 August
19:00

India	44–28 (HT: 27–13)	Sri Lanka

Garuda Theatre, Jakarta

20 August
18:00

Sri Lanka	46–29 (HT: 26–10)	Thailand

Garuda Theatre, Jakarta

21 August
15:00

Bangladesh	29–25 (HT: 17–10)	Sri Lanka

Garuda Theatre, Jakarta

23 August
9:00

South Korea	33–22 (HT: 15–8)	Sri Lanka

Garuda Theatre, Jakarta

=== Women's tournament ===
The women's team consisted of 12 athletes.

Roster

- Madhushani Chaturika
- Kokila Edirisinghe
- Indika Damyanthi
- Thilini Kanchana
- Madhurika Hansmali
- Methusala Thilakshani
- Nimesha Dilrukshi
- Thilakshi Wijethilaka
- Gothami Kaushalya
- Sajini Jayasinghe
- Indiwari Wejethunga
- Sithumini Manojini

Pool A

Pos	Team	Pld	W	D	L	PF	PA	PD	Pts	Qualification
1	India	4	4	0	0	168	69	+99	8	Semifinals
2	Thailand	4	3	0	1	142	75	+67	6	Semifinals
3	Sri Lanka	4	2	0	2	83	113	−30	4	
4	Indonesia	4	1	0	3	84	145	−61	2	
5	Japan	4	0	0	4	63	138	−75	0	

Source: OCA

19 August
10:40

Sri Lanka	15–41 (HT: 7–24)	Thailand

Garuda Theatre, Jakarta

20 August
9:00

Indonesia	17–34 (HT: 6–17)	Sri Lanka

Garuda Theatre, Jakarta

20 August
12:20

Japan	17–22 (HT: 10–8)	Sri Lanka

Garuda Theatre, Jakarta

21 August
9:00

India	38–12 (HT: 23–4)	Sri Lanka

Garuda Theatre, Jakarta

== Karate ==
Sri Lanka entered six karatekas (four men and two women).

Kata

Athlete	Event	Round of 16	Quarterfinals	Semifinals	Final	Rank
Athlete	Event	Opposition Result	Opposition Result	Opposition Result	Opposition Result	Rank
Niyon Sampaya	Men's kata	Park (KOR); L 0–5	did not advance			

Kumite

Athlete	Event	Round of 32	Round of 16	Quarterfinals	Semifinals	Repechage 1	Repechage 2	Final / BM	Rank
Athlete	Event	Opposition Result	Opposition Result	Opposition Result	Opposition Result	Opposition Result	Opposition Result	Opposition Result	Rank
Prasanga Sadaruwan	Men's 60 kg	Bye	Osmani (AFG); W 4–2	Selvam (MAS); L 1–3	did not advance				
Akihiro Lokukaluge	Men's 67 kg	Bye	Shinohara (JPN); W 6–2	Amirali (KAZ); L 0–10	Did not advance	Bye	Al Hadhrami (UAE); L 1–5	Did not advance	=7
Kavindu Jayakody	Men's 84 kg	—N/a	Ma (CHN); L 0–2	did not advance					
Dinusha Kumari	Women's 50 kg	—N/a	Sukatendel (INA); L 0–8	did not advance					
Tharika Mukudam Wasam	Women's 61 kg	—N/a	Jaber (JOR); L 0–8	did not advance					

== Roller Sports ==
Sri Lanka entered four athletes in the speed discipline (two men and two women). This marks the first time the country will compete in the sport at the Asian Games.

=== Speed ===
Athlete	Event	Time	Rank
Lasantha Waradana	Men's 20000 metres elimination	DNF	
Kavindu Wijesinghe	Men's 20000 metres elimination	DNF	
Samithri Koralalage	Women's 20000 metres elimination	DNF	
Dasuni Sosya	Women's 20000 metres elimination	DNF	

== Rowing ==
Sri Lanka entered four rowers. The team finished in last place in all three races in competed in and therefore ranked eighth (and last) in the quadruple sculls.

Men

Athletes	Event	Heats		Repechage		Final	
Athletes	Event	Time	Rank	Time	Rank	Time	Rank
Budhika Chaturanga; Tharanga Rupasinghe; Sugath Senarathne; Udara Udawaththa	Quadruple sculls	7:13.98	4 R	7:17.91	6 FB	6:57.41	8

Qualification Legend: FA=Final A (medal); FB=Final B (non-medal); R=Repechage

- Results given are within the heat.

== Rugby sevens ==
Sri Lanka entered a men's team.

Team	Event	Group Stage				Quarterfinal	Semifinal / Pl.	Final / BM / Pl.	
Team	Event	Opposition Score	Opposition Score	Opposition Score	Rank	Opposition Score	Opposition Score	Opposition Score	Rank
Sri Lanka men's	Men's tournament	United Arab Emirates; W 68–0	South Korea; L 26–31	Afghanistan; W 36–0	2 Q	China; W 17–12	Japan; L 10–12	South Korea; L 14–36	4

=== Men's tournament ===
Sri Lanka announced their squad on August 9, 2018. The team consists of 12 athletes.

- Sudarshana Muthuthanthri
- Danushka Ranjan
- Jason Dissanayake
- Danush Dayan
- Srinath Sooriyabandara
- Kavindu Perera
- Sudam Sooriyarachchi
- Gayan Weeraratne
- Tarinda Ratwatte
- Buddhima Piyarathane
- Reeza Raffaideen
- Rehan Silva

Group C

Pos	Team	Pld	W	D	L	PF	PA	PD	Pts	Qualification
1	South Korea	3	3	0	0	124	31	+93	9	Quarterfinals
2	Sri Lanka	3	2	0	1	130	31	+99	7	Quarterfinals
3	Afghanistan	3	1	0	2	41	78	−37	5	Ranking round 9–12
4	United Arab Emirates	3	0	0	3	0	155	−155	3	Ranking round 9–12

Source: Results

30 August
13:56

Sri Lanka	68–0	United Arab Emirates
Try: Sooriyabandara (2) 1' c, 7' c Muthuthanthri 3' c Piyarathna 6' c Dayan (2) 8' c, 14' c Perera (3) 10' m, 11' c, 12' c Sooriyarachchi 14+' c Con: Sooriyabandara (1/1); Ratwatte (5/6); Muthuthanthri (1/1); Sooriyarachchi (2/2)

Gelora Bung Karno Rugby Field, Jakarta
Referee: Craig Chan (Canada)

30 August
17:58

South Korea	31–26	Sri Lanka
Try: Jang S. (2) 1' m, 3' m Han (2) 7' c, 14' c Lee 8' c Con: Lee (3/4)		Try: Sooriyabandara 5' c Raffaideen 10' c Piyarathna 12' m Sooriyarachchi 14+' c Con: Sooriyabandara (1/2); Raffaideen (1/1); Sooriyarachchi (1/1)

Gelora Bung Karno Rugby Field, Jakarta
Referee: Matthew Rodden (New Zealand)

31 August
14:18

Sri Lanka	36–0	Afghanistan
Try: Sooriyarachchi (2) 3' c, 13' m Sooriyabandara (2) 6' c, 14+' c Perera 10' m Raffaideen 11' m Con: Sooriyabandara (2/3); Sooriyarachchi (1/1); Ratwatte (0/2)

Gelora Bung Karno Rugby Field, Jakarta
Referee: Craig Chan (Canada)

Quarterfinal

31 August
17:36

Sri Lanka	17–12	China
Try: Sooriyarachchi 5' c Sooriyabandara 6' m Raffaideen 7+' m Con: Sooriyarachchi (1/1); Sooriyabandara (0/2)		Try: Zhang 2' m Shan 10' c Con: Shan (1/2)

Gelora Bung Karno Rugby Field, Jakarta
Referee: Noriaki Hashimoto (Japan)

Semifinal

1 September
16:56

Japan	12–10	Sri Lanka
Try: Hashino 4' m Sakai 7+' c Con: Sakai (1/2)		Try: Perera 2' m Muthuthanthri 7' m Con: Sooriyabandara (0/2)

Gelora Bung Karno Rugby Field, Jakarta
Referee: Matthew Rodden (New Zealand)

Bronze medal match

1 September
20:14

Sri Lanka	14–36	South Korea
Try: Ratwatte 8' c Dissanayake 12' c Con: Ratwatte (2/2)		Try: Chang 3' c Kim J.M. 6' m Jang J. 7' c Kim H. 10' c Kim J.H. 13' m Hwang 14+' m Con: Lee (1/1); Kim N. (2/4); Kim S. (0/1)

Gelora Bung Karno Rugby Field, Jakarta
Referee: Noriaki Hashimoto (Japan)

== Sailing ==
Sri Lanka entered one male sailor in the laser standard event.

Men

Athlete	Event	Race													Total Points	Net Points	Final Rank
Athlete	Event	1	2	3	4	5	6	7	8	9	10	11	12	M*	Total Points	Net Points	Final Rank
Roshil Weerathunga	Laser	(15)	15	15	15	15	15	15	15	14	14	14	15	DNQ	177	162	15

== Squash ==
Sri Lanka entered four squash players (four per gender). All four squash players lost their first matches three sets to zero, and did not advance further in the competition.

Singles

Athlete	Event	Round of 32	Round of 16	Quarterfinals	Semifinals	Final	Rank
Athlete	Event	Opposition Score	Opposition Score	Opposition Score	Opposition Score	Opposition Score	Rank
Ravindu Laksiri	Men's	Adnan (MAS); L 0–3 (8–11, 7–11, 9–11)	did not advance				
Shamil Wakeel	Men's	Ghosal (IND); L 0–3 (2–11, 2–11, 1–11)	did not advance				
Fathoum Issadeen	Women's	Watanabe (JPN); L 0–3 (7–11, 9–11, 6–11)	did not advance				
Mihiliya Methsarani	Women's	Subramaniam (MAS); L 0–3 (6–11, 6–11, 6–11)	did not advance				

== Swimming ==
Sri Lanka's swimming team consisted of five male swimmers. Matthew Abeysinghe broke the national record in the men's 200 m freestyle event. Sri Lankan swimmers advanced to only one final, through Matthew Abeysinghe's sixth-place finish in the 100 metres freestyle event. The sixth-place finish, was the best swimming result for Sri Lanka at the Asian Games.

Men

Athlete	Event	Heat		Final	
Athlete	Event	Time	Rank	Time	Rank
Kyle Abeysinghe	50 m freestyle	23.36	20	did not advance	
Matthew Abeysinghe	50 m freestyle	22.88	=12	did not advance	
Kyle Abeysinghe	100 m freestyle	50.14	13	did not advance	
Matthew Abeysinghe	100 m freestyle	49.48	4 Q	49.28	6
Matthew Abeysinghe	200 m freestyle	1:50.97 NR	12	did not advance	
Kavindra Nugawela	200 m freestyle	1:56.01	26	did not advance	
Akalanka Peiris	50 m backstroke	26.57	17	did not advance	
Akalanka Peiris	50 m butterfly	25.20	25	did not advance	
Akalanka Peiris	200 m backstroke	2:12.14	16	did not advance	
Cherantha de Silva	50 m butterfly	25.36	26	did not advance	
Cherantha de Silva	200 m butterfly	2:05.90	14	did not advance	
Matthew Abeysinghe; Akalanka Peiris; Kyle Abeysinghe; Cherantha de Silva; Kavindra Nugawela	4 × 100 m freestyle relay	DSQ		did not advance	

== Table Tennis ==
Sri Lanka entered two table tennis players (one male and one female).

Athlete	Event	Round of 64	Round of 32	Round of 16	Quarterfinals	Semifinals	Final	Rank
Athlete	Event	Opposition Score	Opposition Score	Opposition Score	Opposition Score	Opposition Score	Opposition Score	Rank
Imesh Ranasinghe	Men's singles	Sonpasith Mosangsinh (LAO); L 1–4 (12–14, 11–8, RET)	did not advance					
Ishara Madurangi	Women's singles	Fatima Khan (PAK); W 4–0 (11–8, 11–2, 11–8, 11–5)	Wang Manyu (CHN); L 0–4 (8–11, 5–11, 8–11, 1–11)	did not advance				
Imesh Ranasinghe; Ishara Madurangi	Mixed doubles	Bye	Tanviriyavechakul / Sawettabut (THA); L 0–3 (1–11, 2–11, 5–11)	did not advance				

== Taekwondo ==
Sri Lanka entered six taekwondo practitioners (three per gender).

Athlete	Event	Round of 32	Round of 16	Quarterfinals	Semifinals	Final	Rank
Athlete	Event	Opposition Result	Opposition Result	Opposition Result	Opposition Result	Opposition Result	Rank
Thisara Dharmapriya	Men's −58 kg	Võ Quốc Hưng (VIE); L 11–40	did not advance				
Chalinda Liyanage	Men's −63 kg	Masanojo Honma (JPN); W 21–18	Sardor Toirov (UZB); L 6–22	did not advance			
Sheron Fernando	Men's +80 kg	—N/a	Akshay Kumar (IND); L 8–13	did not advance			
Kumudu Wijerathna	Women's −49 kg	Bye	Sidra Batool (PAK); W 28–14	Miyu Yamada (JPN); L 8–32	did not advance		
Nisansala Jahinge	Women's −67 kg	—N/a	Julyana Al-Sadeq (JOR); L 0–38	did not advance			
Ranuri Wickramasinghe	Women's +67 kg	—N/a	Sorn Seavmey (CAM); L WDN	did not advance			

== Tennis ==
Sri Lanka's tennis team consisted of four athletes (two men and two women).

Singles

Athlete	Event	Round of 64	Round of 32	Round of 16	Quarterfinals	Semifinals	Final	Rank
Athlete	Event	Opposition Score	Opposition Score	Opposition Score	Opposition Score	Opposition Score	Opposition Score	Rank
Sharmal Dissanayake	Men's	Abdulla (MDV); W 2–0 (6–1, 6–3)	Uchiyama (JPN); L 0–2 (3–6, 1–6)	did not advance				
Yasitha De Silva	Men's	Habib (LBN); L 0–2 (2–6, 1–6)	did not advance					
Anjalika Kurera	Women's	Bye	Kato (JPN); L 0–2 (0–6, 1–6)	did not advance				
Anika Seneviratne	Women's	Erdenebileg (MGL); W 2–0 (6–1, 6–2)	Zhang (CHN); L 0–2 (1–6, 2–6)	did not advance				

Doubles

Athlete	Event	Round of 64	Round of 32	Round of 16	Quarterfinals	Semifinals	Final	Rank
Athlete	Event	Opposition Score	Opposition Score	Opposition Score	Opposition Score	Opposition Score	Opposition Score	Rank
Sharmal Dissanayake; Yasitha De Silva	Men's	Bye	Nedovyesov / Khabibulin (KAZ); L 0–2 (4–6, 2–6)	did not advance				
Anjalika Kurera; Anika Seneviratne	Women's	—N/a	Han / Kim (KOR); L 0–2 (1–6, 0–6)	did not advance				
Yasitha De Silva; Anika Seneviratne	Mixed	Al-Nabhani / Al-Nabhani (OMA); L 0–2 (4–6, 3–6)	did not advance					
Sharmal Dissanayake; Anjalika Kurera	Mixed	Bye	Fayziev / Amanmuradova (UZB); L 0–2 (4–6, 3–6)	did not advance				

== Triathlon ==
Sri Lanka entered one male triathlete. This also marked the country's Asian Games debut in the sport.

Individual

Athlete	Event	Swim (1.5 km)	Trans 1	Bike (39.6 km)	Trans 2	Run (10 km)	Total Time	Rank
Lakruwan Dewa	Men's	24:55	0:31	1:03:06	0:31	42:25	2:11:28	24

== Volleyball ==
Sri Lanka will be returning to the Asian Games for the first time since 1966. The Sri Lankan team finished in 13th place (out of 20 teams) after defeating Vietnam in the 13th place match.

=== Indoor volleyball ===
Team	Event	Group Stage		Playoffs	Quarterfinals / Pl.	Semifinals / Pl.	Final / BM / Pl.	
Team	Event	Oppositions Scores	Rank	Opposition Score	Opposition Score	Opposition Score	Opposition Score	Rank
Sri Lanka men's	Men's tournament	Thailand: L 1–3; Vietnam: W 3–0; China: L 1–3	3	Did not advance	Maldives; W 3–1	Nepal; W 3–1	Vietnam; W 3–0	13

==== Men's tournament ====
Roster

Sri Lanka's men's volleyball team consisted of 14 athletes.

- Chamara Mihiran
- Deepthi Romesh
- Gayan Madushanka
- Lasindu Wasanthapriya
- Janitha Surath
- Malith Chamara
- Shamil Silva
- Ayesh Perera
- Wasantha Lakmal
- Kasun Fernando
- Danushka Fernando
- Sehan Sagara
- A.W. Lakmal
- Pramesh Sudasingha

Pool E

Pos	Team	Pld	W	L	Pts	SW	SL	SR	SPW	SPL	SPR	Qualification
1	Thailand	3	2	1	7	8	5	1.600	301	284	1.060	Classification for 1–12
2	China	3	2	1	6	8	6	1.333	313	301	1.040	Classification for 1–12
3	Sri Lanka	3	1	2	3	5	6	0.833	240	244	0.984	Classification for 13–20
4	Vietnam	3	1	2	2	4	8	0.500	260	285	0.912	Classification for 13–20

Source: OCA

Date	Time		Score		Set 1	Set 2	Set 3	Set 4	Set 5	Total	Report
20 Aug	12:30	Thailand	3–1	Sri Lanka	13–25	25–21	25–23	27–25		90–94	Report
23 Aug	16:30	Vietnam	0–3	Sri Lanka	23–25	18–25	18–25			59–75	Report
25 Aug	10:00	Sri Lanka	1–3	China	15–25	25–20	14–25	17–25		71–95	Report
26 Aug	10:00	Sri Lanka	3–1	Maldives	16–25	25–18	27–25	25–15		93–83	Report
30 Aug	16:30	Sri Lanka	3–1	Nepal	23–25	25–16	26–24	25–21		99–86	Report
31 Aug	19:30	Sri Lanka	3–0	Vietnam	25–21	25–21	25–20			75–62	Report

== Weightlifting ==
Sri Lanka entered four weightlifters (two per gender).

Athlete	Event	Snatch		Clean & Jerk		Total	Rank
Athlete	Event	Result	Rank	Result	Rank	Total	Rank
Thilanka Palangasinghe	Men's −62 kg	NM		DNF			
Indika Dissanayake	Men's −69 kg	130	15	NM		DNF	
Dinusha Gomes	Women's −48 kg	NM		DNF			
Chamari Warnakulasuriya	Women's −53 kg	73	11	96	10	169	10

== Wrestling ==
Sri Lanka entered one male wrestler.

Men's freestyle

Athlete	Event	Qualification	Round of 16	Quarterfinal	Semifinal	Repechage 1	Repechage 2	Final / BM	
Athlete	Event	Opposition Result	Opposition Result	Opposition Result	Opposition Result	Opposition Result	Opposition Result	Opposition Result	Rank
Charles Fernando	−57 kg	Bye	Eko Roni Saputra (INA); L 0–10	did not advance					15

== Wushu ==
Sri Lanka entered two wushu athletes (one man and one woman).

Sanda

Athlete	Event	Round of 32	Round of 16	Quarterfinals	Semifinals	Final	Rank
Athlete	Event	Opposition Result	Opposition Result	Opposition Result	Opposition Result	Opposition Result	Rank
Pethum Balawardana	Men's −60 kg	Bye	Noukhith Latsaphao (LAO); W 2–0	Nghiêm Văn Ý (VIE); L 0–2	did not advance		
Maleesha Pathirage	Women's −52 kg	—N/a	Chen Wei-ting (TPE); L 0–2	did not advance			

== Demonstration sport ==
=== eSports ===
Sri Lanka qualified one athlete in e-sports.

Athlete	Event	Quarterfinals	Semifinals	Final	Rank
Athlete	Event	Opposition Result	Opposition Result	Opposition Result	Rank
Amruth Alfred	StarCraft II	Huang Yu-Hsiang (TPE); L 0–3	did not advance		

== See also ==
- Sri Lanka at the 2018 Commonwealth Games
- Sri Lanka at the 2018 Summer Youth Olympics
- Sri Lanka at the 2018 Asian Para Games
