= Danushka Ranjan =

Sri Lankan rugby sevens player (born 1993)

Danushka Ranjan (born 2 June 1993) is a Sri Lankan rugby sevens player.

== Career ==
He pursued an interest in rugby while studying at St. Peter's College in Bambalapitiya. He was appointed as the captain of the Sri Lankan national youth rugby sevens team in the rugby sevens tournament during the 2011 Commonwealth Youth Games.

He made his Asian Games debut representing Sri Lanka at the 2014 Asian Games and took part in the men's rugby sevens tournament. Danushka also eventually made his Commonwealth Games debut representing Sri Lanka at the 2014 Commonwealth Games and competed with the national rugby sevens outfit in the men's rugby sevens tournament.

Danushka was named as the captain of the Sri Lankan rugby sevens side for the 2016 Hong Kong Asian Sevens replacing the regular Sudarshana Muthuthanthri who was sidelined from the national squad due to injury concerns. Under his captaincy, Sri Lanka lost the final by the barest of all margins with a scoreline of 22–17 in favor of Hong Kong and Sri Lanka had an outside chance during the final of the 2016 Hong Kong Asian Sevens to nearly pull of a memorable victory as the chances were propelled by Jason Dissanayake's valiant efforts in crossing the try scoring line on 4 occasions.

He was named in the Sri Lankan squad for the Monaco Olympic Qualifier Sevens series which was conducted as an Olympic Repachage Tournament by World Rugby to determine the last slot for the 12 team men's rugby sevens tournament for the 2016 Summer Olympics in Rio de Janeiro.

In March 2017, he was appointed as the skipper of the Sri Lanka Tuskers squad ahead of the 2017 World Series Qualifiers in Hong Kong. He was relinquished from captaincy duties ahead of the 2017 Asia Rugby Sevens Series as Sudarshana Muthuthanthri returned to the team from an injury layoff to lead Sri Lanka Tuskers.

He also represented Sri Lanka at the 2018 Commonwealth Games and was part of the Sri Lanka Tuskers squad in the men's rugby sevens tournament and he ended up the tournament as the top try scorer for Sri Lanka with four tries in three matches.

He was initially included in the Sri Lankan contingent at the 2018 Asian Games for the men's rugby sevens tournament. However, he was withdrawn from the 2018 Asian Games prior to the start of the competition due to an hamstring injury.
