= Rugby sevens at the 2018 Asian Games – Men's tournament =

Asian Games Rugby event

Men at the 2018 Asian Games
- Venue: Gelora Bung Karno Rugby Field
- Date: 30 August – 1 September 2018
- Competitors: 143 from 12 nations

Medalists
gold medal	Hong Kong
silver medal	Japan
bronze medal	South Korea

The men's tournament of rugby sevens at the 2018 Asian Games at Jakarta, Indonesia, was started on 30 August and ended on 1 September 2018. Games were held at the Gelora Bung Karno Rugby Field.

== Squads ==
Afghanistan	China	Chinese Taipei	Hong Kong
Omar Slaimankhel; Jawid Rahmani; Abdul Bari Gazang; Sayear Slaimankhel; Zahidullah Slaimankhel; Mohammad Asghar Azizi; Mohammad Moosa Hashimi; Mussa Wardak; Zakir Slaimankhel; Sabir Slaimankhel; Naib Shah Shirzad; Mostafa Sayed	Liu Luda; Zhang Chao; Li Haitao; Feng Wenru; Shan Changshun; Hu Zhenye; Qi Changyuan; Chen Yongqiang; Jiang Liwei; Wang Jianhua; Liu Junkui; Ma Chong	Huang Te-lung; Hsieh Pin-yi; Shen Ching-hung; Shen Ming-kuang; Lo Hsin-kuei; Huang Po-wei; Sun Wei-chiang; Sung Che-yu; Chang Lun-wei; Chang Hao-wei; Chen Chih-chieh; Lin Chueh-hao	Lee Jones; Michael Coverdale; Max Woodward; Liam Herbert; Jamie Hood; Hugo Stiles; Alessandro Nardoni; Max Denmark; Ben Rimene; Eric Kwok; Cado Lee; Salom Yiu
Indonesia	Japan	Malaysia	Pakistan
Nanda Septian Oloan; Handika Hadi Wibowo; Fransiscus Sinaga; Dionysius Oktavian Andi; Lawrence Oiyaitou; Aqiel Azis Safrurrozi; Christopher Adhitya Hardwika; Yusuf Satria Nugroho; Buldan Abdurrohman; Muhammad Rifaldi Sauri; Andika Yudistira Pratama; Muhammad Danial Al-Fikri	Lote Tuqiri; Tevita Tupou; Taisei Hayashi; Rikiya Oishi; Kameli Soejima; Dai Ozawa; Katsuyuki Sakai; Keisuke Shin; Ryota Kano; Kosuke Hashino; Chihito Matsui; Naoki Motomura	Wan Izzuddin Ismail; Safwan Abdullah; Nasharuddin Ismail; Siddiq Amir Jalil; Ameer Nasrun Zulkifli; Khairul Abdillah Ramli; Zulkifli Azmi; Dzafran Asyraff; Zulhisham Rasli; Azwan Zuwairi Mat Zizi; Amalul Hazim Nasarrudin; Firdaus Tarmizi	Ali Shahid; Ahmed Wasim Akram; Kashif Khwaja; Khalid Hussain Bhatti; Muhammad Waqas; Musdaq Altaf; Muhammad Haroon; Muhammad Shoaib Akbar; Nasir Mehmood; Muhammad Afzal; Daud Gill; Faisal Aslam
South Korea	Sri Lanka	Thailand	United Arab Emirates
Han Kun-kyu; Kim Jeong-min; Kim Hyun-soo; Chang Yong-heung; Lee Jae-bok; Kim Nam-uk; Jang Jeong-min; Hwang In-jo; Jang Seong-min; Kim Jin-hyeok; Kim Gwong-min; Kim Sung-soo	Rehan Silva; Kavindu Perera; Gayan Weerarathna; Danushka Ranjan; Reeza Raffaideen; Dansha Dayan; Jason Dissanayake; Sudharshana Muthuthanthri; Srinath Sooriyabandara; Tharinda Ratwatte; Buddhima Piyarathna; Sudam Sooriyarachchi	Panupong Puangpun; Khomchak Chakrabandhu; Sumet Thammaporn; Akarin Thitisakulvit; Sarut Janda; Klin Laksanasompong; Noppasit Kradkrayang; Chatree Wannadit; Puvadol Palukpetch; Warongkorn Khamkoet; Sichon Nakarin; Wuttipong Sakulthianthong	Saeed Ibrahim Saad; Mohamed Al-Shamsi; Rashed Al-Marzooqi; Yousuf Lashkri; Hassan Al-Noobi; Majid Al-Balooshi; Abdalla Rabee Salmin; Ali Al-Sereidi; Walid Al-Balooshi; Ahmed Al-Areefi; Ahmad Al-Shehi

== Results ==
All times are Western Indonesia Time (UTC+07:00)

=== Preliminary round ===
==== Group A ====
Pos	Team	Pld	W	D	L	PF	PA	PD	Pts	Qualification
1	Hong Kong	3	3	0	0	142	29	+113	9	Quarterfinals
2	China	3	2	0	1	110	49	+61	7	Quarterfinals
3	Thailand	3	1	0	2	57	76	−19	5	Quarterfinals
4	Pakistan	3	0	0	3	5	160	−155	3	Ranking round 9–12

Source: Results

30 August
12:28

China	40–7	Thailand
Try: Shan (2) 2' c, 9' m Feng (2) 6' c, 7+' c Li 8' c Qi 14+' c Con: Shan (4/5); Qi (1/1)		Try: Thitisakulvit 4' c Con: Khamkoet (1/1)

Gelora Bung Karno Rugby Field, Jakarta
Referee: Suguru Kamamuta (Japan)

30 August
12:50

Hong Kong	64–5	Pakistan
Try: Yiu (3) 1' m, 3' c, 7' c Jones (2) 5' c, 7+' m Denmark (3) 10' c, 12' c, 14+' c Woodward 13' c Lee 14' c Con: Rimene (4/6); Hood (2/3); Herbert (1/1)		Try: Aslam 9' m Con: Akram (0/1)

Gelora Bung Karno Rugby Field, Jakarta
Referee: Charlie Brown (Ireland)

30 August
16:08

Thailand	43–0	Pakistan
Try: Thitisakulvit (2) 3' m, 11' c Palukpetch 4' m Khamkoet 7' c Puangpun 8' m Chakrabandhu 10' c Kradkrayang 14' c Con: Khamkoet (1/3); Thitisakulvit (2/3); Laksanasompong (1/1)

Gelora Bung Karno Rugby Field, Jakarta
Referee: Noriaki Hashimoto (Japan)

30 August
16:30

Hong Kong	42–17	China
Try: Rimene (2) 1' c, 7+' c Yiu 3' c Nardoni (2) 6' c, 9' c Denmark 11' c Con: Rimene (5/5); Hood (1/1)		Try: Shan (2) 4' m, 13' m Liu J. 14+' c Con: Ma (0/2); Shan (1/1)

Gelora Bung Karno Rugby Field, Jakarta
Referee: Suguru Kamamuta (Japan)

31 August
12:50

China	53–0	Pakistan
Try: Shan (2) 2' m, 7' m Jiang (2) 4' c, 6' c Hu 8' m Ma 10' m Liu J. (2) 12' c, 14' c Wang 13' m Con: Shan (0/3); Ma (2/3); Feng (2/2); Wang (0/1)

Gelora Bung Karno Rugby Field, Jakarta
Referee: Patrick Kwok (Hong Kong)

31 August
13:12

Hong Kong	36–7	Thailand
Try: Herbert 2' c Yiu 3' c Jones (2) 7+' m, 14' m Rimene 11' m Coverdale 12' c Con: Hood (1/1); Rimene (2/5)		Try: Janda 6' c Con: Khamkoet (1/1)

Gelora Bung Karno Rugby Field, Jakarta
Referee: Noriaki Hashimoto (Japan)

==== Group B ====
Pos	Team	Pld	W	D	L	PF	PA	PD	Pts	Qualification
1	Japan	3	3	0	0	170	0	+170	9	Quarterfinals
2	Malaysia	3	2	0	1	56	62	−6	7	Quarterfinals
3	Chinese Taipei	3	1	0	2	51	74	−23	5	Quarterfinals
4	Indonesia	3	0	0	3	31	172	−141	3	Ranking round 9–12

Source: Results

30 August
13:12

Malaysia	17–10	Chinese Taipei
Try: Zulkifli 7+' m Azmi 10' m Nasarrudin 13' c Con: Mat Zizi (0/2); Asyraff (1/1)		Try: Hsieh 1' m Lo 6' m Con: Huang P. (0/2)

Gelora Bung Karno Rugby Field, Jakarta
Referee: Matthew Rodden (New Zealand)

30 August
13:34

Japan	92–0	Indonesia
Try: Matsui (3) 1' m, 5' c, 7' m Ozawa (2) 2' c, 3' c Motomura (3) 2' c, 6' c, 9' c Sakai 7+' c Oishi (2) 10' m, 11' c Kano 12' c Hayashi 14' c Tuqiri 14+' c Con: Sakai (11/14)

Gelora Bung Karno Rugby Field, Jakarta
Referee: Patrick Kwok (Hong Kong)

30 August
16:52

Chinese Taipei	41–26	Indonesia
Try: Huang T. 2' m Shen M. (2) 4' m, 11' m Chen (2) 7' c, 10' c Hsieh 8' c Huang P. 12' m Con: Shen C. (0/1); Huang P. (3/5); Lin (0/1)		Try: Abdurrohman 5' c Wibowo 7+' c Oloan 9' c Andi 14+' m Con: Oloan (3/4)

Gelora Bung Karno Rugby Field, Jakarta
Referee: Craig Chan (Canada)

30 August
17:14

Japan	47–0	Malaysia
Try: Hashino (2) 2' c, 12' c Hayashi 6' c Sakai (2) 7' c, 14' m Ozawa 9' c Kano 13' c Con: Sakai (5/6); Hashino (1/1)

Gelora Bung Karno Rugby Field, Jakarta
Referee: Charlie Brown (Ireland)

31 August
13:34

Malaysia	39–5	Indonesia
Try: Azmi 2' m Ismail 5' m Nasarrudin (2) 6' c, 8' m Zulkifli (2) 12' c, 14' m Tarmizi 14+' m Con: Mat Zizi (1/4); Asyraff (1/3)		Try: Oloan 10' m Con: Oiyaitou (0/1)

Gelora Bung Karno Rugby Field, Jakarta
Referee: Suguru Kamamuta (Japan)

31 August
13:56

Japan	31–0	Chinese Taipei
Try: Shin 1' m Motomura (3) 3' c, 7' m, 13' c Kano 10' c Con: Hashino (1/3); Sakai (2/2)

Gelora Bung Karno Rugby Field, Jakarta
Referee: Matthew Rodden (New Zealand)

==== Group C ====
Pos	Team	Pld	W	D	L	PF	PA	PD	Pts	Qualification
1	South Korea	3	3	0	0	124	31	+93	9	Quarterfinals
2	Sri Lanka	3	2	0	1	130	31	+99	7	Quarterfinals
3	Afghanistan	3	1	0	2	41	78	−37	5	Ranking round 9–12
4	United Arab Emirates	3	0	0	3	0	155	−155	3	Ranking round 9–12

Source: Results

30 August
13:56

Sri Lanka	68–0	United Arab Emirates
Try: Sooriyabandara (2) 1' c, 7' c Muthuthanthri 3' c Piyarathna 6' c Dayan (2) 8' c, 14' c Perera (3) 10' m, 11' c, 12' c Sooriyarachchi 14+' c Con: Sooriyabandara (1/1); Ratwatte (5/6); Muthuthanthri (1/1); Sooriyarachchi (2/2)

Gelora Bung Karno Rugby Field, Jakarta
Referee: Craig Chan (Canada)

30 August
14:18

South Korea	42–5	Afghanistan
Try: Chang 1' c Han 5' c Kim J.M. 8' c Jang S. 10' c Lee 12' c Hwang 14+' c Con: Lee (5/5); Kim S. (1/1)		Try: Zak. Slaimankhel 7' m Con: O. Slaimankhel (0/1)

Gelora Bung Karno Rugby Field, Jakarta
Referee: Noriaki Hashimoto (Japan)

30 August
17:36

United Arab Emirates	0–36	Afghanistan
		Try: Gazang (2) 2' m, 7' c Zak. Slaimankhel 3' m Sayed 5' m O. Slaimankhel 12' c Azizi 14' c Con: Gazang (0/1); O. Slaimankhel (3/5)

Gelora Bung Karno Rugby Field, Jakarta
Referee: Patrick Kwok (Hong Kong)

30 August
17:58

South Korea	31–26	Sri Lanka
Try: Jang S. (2) 1' m, 3' m Han (2) 7' c, 14' c Lee 8' c Con: Lee (3/4)		Try: Sooriyabandara 5' c Raffaideen 10' c Piyarathna 12' m Sooriyarachchi 14+' c Con: Sooriyabandara (1/2); Raffaideen (1/1); Sooriyarachchi (1/1)

Gelora Bung Karno Rugby Field, Jakarta
Referee: Matthew Rodden (New Zealand)

31 August
14:18

Sri Lanka	36–0	Afghanistan
Try: Sooriyarachchi (2) 3' c, 13' m Sooriyabandara (2) 6' c, 14+' c Perera 10' m Raffaideen 11' m Con: Sooriyabandara (2/3); Sooriyarachchi (1/1); Ratwatte (0/2)

Gelora Bung Karno Rugby Field, Jakarta
Referee: Craig Chan (Canada)

31 August
14:40

South Korea	51–0	United Arab Emirates
Try: Jang J. (4) 4' m, 4' c, 7' c, 9' m Kim N. 5' m Hwang 8' m Chang (2) 12' m, 14' m Han 14+' c Con: Lee (2/3); Kim N. (0/1); Kim S. (0/4); Kim J.H. (1/1)

Gelora Bung Karno Rugby Field, Jakarta
Referee: Charlie Brown (Ireland)

==== Summary ====
Pos	Team	Pld	W	D	L	PF	PA	PD	Pts	Qualification
1	Japan	3	3	0	0	170	0	+170	9	Quarterfinals
2	Hong Kong	3	3	0	0	142	29	+113	9	Quarterfinals
3	South Korea	3	3	0	0	124	31	+93	9	Quarterfinals
4	Sri Lanka	3	2	0	1	130	31	+99	7	Quarterfinals
5	China	3	2	0	1	110	49	+61	7	Quarterfinals
6	Malaysia	3	2	0	1	56	62	−6	7	Quarterfinals
7	Thailand	3	1	0	2	57	76	−19	5	Quarterfinals
8	Chinese Taipei	3	1	0	2	51	74	−23	5	Quarterfinals
9	Afghanistan	3	1	0	2	41	78	−37	5	Ranking round 9–12
10	Indonesia	3	0	0	3	31	172	−141	3	Ranking round 9–12
11	Pakistan	3	0	0	3	5	160	−155	3	Ranking round 9–12
12	United Arab Emirates	3	0	0	3	0	155	−155	3	Ranking round 9–12

Source: Results

=== Ranking round 9–12 ===
Pos	Team	Pld	W	D	L	PF	PA	PD	Pts
1	Afghanistan	3	3	0	0	94	19	+75	9
2	Pakistan	3	2	0	1	102	20	+82	7
3	Indonesia	3	1	0	2	65	55	+10	5
4	United Arab Emirates	3	0	0	3	5	172	−167	3

Source: Results

31 August
16:30

Afghanistan	50–0	United Arab Emirates
Try: O. Slaimankhel (3) 2' c, 6' c, 9' m Zak. Slaimankhel (2) 3' c, 7+' c Gazang 5' c Rahmani 11' m Hashimi 13' m Con: O. Slaimankhel (5/7); Hashimi (0/1)

Gelora Bung Karno Rugby Field, Jakarta
Referee: Aaqil Jamaldeen (Sri Lanka)

31 August
16:52

Indonesia	5–21	Pakistan
Try: Pratama 12' m Con: Sauri (0/1)		Try: Bhatti 1' c Mehmood 9' c Altaf 13' c Con: Mehmood (3/3)

Gelora Bung Karno Rugby Field, Jakarta
Referee: Leow Wei Liang (Singapore)

1 September
11:00

Afghanistan	15–7	Pakistan
Try: O. Slaimankhel (2) 4' m, 13' m Gazang 10' m Con: O. Slaimankhel (0/3)		Try: Bhatti 12' c Con: Akram (1/1)

Gelora Bung Karno Rugby Field, Jakarta
Referee: Charlie Brown (Ireland)

1 September
11:22

Indonesia	48–5	United Arab Emirates
Try: Oiyaitou 1' m Oloan (2) 3' c, 13' c Pratama 5' m Andi 7' m Safrurrozi 10' m Al-Fikri 12' c Wibowo 14' c Con: Oloan (4/8)		Try: Al-Shehi 7+' m Con: Al-Shehi (0/1)

Gelora Bung Karno Rugby Field, Jakarta
Referee: Leow Wei Liang (Singapore)

1 September
17:40

Pakistan	74–0	United Arab Emirates
Try: Aslam (5) 2' c, 5' m, 7' c, 8' c, 14' m Mehmood (4) 6' c, 7+' m, 11' c, 14+' c Gill (2) 10' c, 12' m Akram 11' m Con: Mehmood (4/4); Akram (1/4); Afzal (2/4)

Gelora Bung Karno Rugby Field, Jakarta
Referee: Craig Chan (Canada)

1 September
18:02

Afghanistan	29–12	Indonesia
Try: O. Slaimankhel 1' c Gazang (3) 4' m, 7' m, 14' m Zak. Slaimankhel 7+' c Con: O. Slaimankhel (1/3); Say. Slaimankhel (1/1); Azizi (0/1)		Try: Nugroho 10' c Oloan 11' m Con: Oloan (1/2)

Gelora Bung Karno Rugby Field, Jakarta
Referee: Charlie Brown (Ireland)

=== Final round ===
Quarterfinals
31 August
Japan	43
Chinese Taipei	0
31 August
Sri Lanka	17
China	12
31 August
South Korea	40
Malaysia	5
31 August
Hong Kong	52
Thailand	0

Semifinals
1 September
Japan	12
Sri Lanka	10
1 September
South Korea	7
Hong Kong	19

Gold medal match
1 September
Japan	0
Hong Kong	14
Bronze medal match
1 September
Sri Lanka	14
South Korea	36

Semifinals 5th–8th
1 September
Chinese Taipei	7
China	38
1 September
Malaysia	33
Thailand	12

Classification 5th–6th
1 September
China	7
Malaysia	12
Classification 7th–8th
1 September
Chinese Taipei	24
Thailand	19

==== Quarterfinals ====
31 August
17:14

Japan	43–0	Chinese Taipei
Try: Matsui (2) 1' m, 4' c Hashino 6' m Soejima 8' c Ozawa (3) 10' c, 12' c, 14' m Con: Sakai (4/7)

Gelora Bung Karno Rugby Field, Jakarta
Referee: Patrick Kwok (Hong Kong)

31 August
17:36

Sri Lanka	17–12	China
Try: Sooriyarachchi 5' c Sooriyabandara 6' m Raffaideen 7+' m Con: Sooriyarachchi (1/1); Sooriyabandara (0/2)		Try: Zhang 2' m Shan 10' c Con: Shan (1/2)

Gelora Bung Karno Rugby Field, Jakarta
Referee: Noriaki Hashimoto (Japan)

31 August
17:58

South Korea	40–5	Malaysia
Try: Kim J.M. 1' c Kim H. 4' c Kim N. 7+' c Jang J. 10' m Chang (2) 14' c, 14+' c Con: Lee (3/3); Kim N. (2/3)		Try: Mat Zizi 8' m Con: Mat Zizi (0/1)

Gelora Bung Karno Rugby Field, Jakarta
Referee: Matthew Rodden (New Zealand)

31 August
18:20

Hong Kong	52–0	Thailand
Try: Yiu 1' c Hood (2) 2' c, 7+' m Nardoni 6' c Denmark (2) 8' c, 14' m Jones 10' c Kwok 13' c Con: Hood (2/3); Rimene (3/3); Stiles (1/2)

Gelora Bung Karno Rugby Field, Jakarta
Referee: Suguru Kamamuta (Japan)

==== Semifinals 5th–8th ====
1 September
16:12

Chinese Taipei	7–38	China
Try: Huang T. 6' c Con: Huang P. (1/1)		Try: Qi (2) 3' c, 7+' m Zhang 5' m Feng 10' c Ma 12' c Con: Ma (1/3); Feng (2/2)

Gelora Bung Karno Rugby Field, Jakarta
Referee: Patrick Kwok (Hong Kong)

1 September
16:34

Malaysia	33–12	Thailand
Try: Ismail 3' c Zulkifli 4' c Jalil 6' c Nasarrudin 7+' m Mat Zizi 8' c Con: Mat Zizi (4/5)		Try: Puangpun 10' m Chakrabandhu 12' c Con: Khamkoet (1/2)

Gelora Bung Karno Rugby Field, Jakarta
Referee: Noriaki Hashimoto (Japan)

==== Semifinals ====
1 September
16:56

Japan	12–10	Sri Lanka
Try: Hashino 4' m Sakai 7+' c Con: Sakai (1/2)		Try: Perera 2' m Muthuthanthri 7' m Con: Sooriyabandara (0/2)

Gelora Bung Karno Rugby Field, Jakarta
Referee: Matthew Rodden (New Zealand)

1 September
17:18

South Korea	7–19	Hong Kong
Try: Jang J. 8' c Con: Lee (1/1)		Try: Lee (2) 5' c, 7' c Rimene 11' m Con: Hood (1/2); Rimene (1/1)

Gelora Bung Karno Rugby Field, Jakarta
Referee: Suguru Kamamuta (Japan)

==== Classification 7th–8th ====
1 September
18:46

Chinese Taipei	24–19	Thailand
Try: Shen M. 1' c Hsieh 7+' m Huang P. 10' c Chang L. 13' m Con: Huang P. (2/4)		Try: Sakulthianthong 6' c Kradkrayang (2) 7' m, 12' c Con: Khamkoet (2/3)

Gelora Bung Karno Rugby Field, Jakarta
Referee: Craig Chan (Canada)

==== Classification 5th–6th ====
1 September
19:30

China	7–12	Malaysia
Try: Ma 10' c Con: Ma (1/1)		Try: Nasarrudin 3' m Ismail 5' c Con: Mat Zizi (1/2)

Gelora Bung Karno Rugby Field, Jakarta
Referee: Suguru Kamamuta (Japan)

==== Bronze medal match ====
1 September
20:14

Sri Lanka	14–36	South Korea
Try: Ratwatte 8' c Dissanayake 12' c Con: Ratwatte (2/2)		Try: Chang 3' c Kim J.M. 6' m Jang J. 7' c Kim H. 10' c Kim J.H. 13' m Hwang 14+' m Con: Lee (1/1); Kim N. (2/4); Kim S. (0/1)

Gelora Bung Karno Rugby Field, Jakarta
Referee: Noriaki Hashimoto (Japan)

==== Gold medal match ====
1 September
21:06

Japan	0–14	Hong Kong
		Try: Yiu 2' c Nardoni 7+' c Con: Rimene (2/2)

Gelora Bung Karno Rugby Field, Jakarta
Referee: Matthew Rodden (New Zealand)

== Final standing ==
Rank	Team	Pld	W	D	L
1st place, gold medalist(s)	Hong Kong	6	6	0	0
2nd place, silver medalist(s)	Japan	6	5	0	1
3rd place, bronze medalist(s)	South Korea	6	5	0	1
4	Sri Lanka	6	3	0	3
5	Malaysia	6	4	0	2
6	China	6	3	0	3
7	Chinese Taipei	6	2	0	4
8	Thailand	6	1	0	5
9	Afghanistan	6	4	0	2
10	Pakistan	6	2	0	4
11	Indonesia	6	1	0	5
12	United Arab Emirates	6	0	0	6
