= Rugby sevens at the 2018 Commonwealth Games – Men's team rosters =

This article shows the rosters of all participating teams at the men's rugby sevens tournament at the 2018 Commonwealth Games in Gold Coast.

== Pool A ==
=== South Africa ===
The following team was announced as the 2018 Commonwealth Games sevens team. Seabelo Senatla (due to injury) and Kwagga Smith (to focus on the 2018 Super Rugby season) were later excluded.

Head coach: Neil Powell

No.	Pos.	Player	Date of birth (age)	Union / Club
1	FW	Tim Agaba	July 23, 1989 (aged 28)	South Africa 7s
2	FW	Philip Snyman (c)	March 26, 1987 (aged 31)	South Africa 7s
3	FW	Dylan Sage	January 24, 1992 (aged 26)	South Africa 7s
4	FW	Zain Davids	May 4, 1997 (aged 20)	South Africa 7s
5	FW	Werner Kok	January 17, 1993 (aged 25)	Western Province
6	FW	Kyle Brown	February 6, 1987 (aged 31)	South Africa 7s
7	BK	Branco du Preez	May 8, 1990 (aged 27)	Golden Lions
8	BK	Rosko Specman	April 28, 1989 (aged 28)	Free State Cheetahs
9	BK	Justin Geduld	October 1, 1993 (aged 24)	Western Province
10	BK	Cecil Afrika	March 3, 1988 (aged 30)	Free State Cheetahs
11	BK	Siviwe Soyizwapi	December 7, 1992 (aged 25)	Western Province
12	BK	Ruhan Nel	May 17, 1991 (aged 26)	Western Province
13	FW	Ryan Oosthuizen (Reserve)	May 22, 1995 (aged 22)	Western Province

=== Scotland ===
The following team was announced as the 2018 Commonwealth Games sevens team.

Head coach: John Dalziel

No.	Pos.	Player	Date of birth (age)	Union / Club
1	FW	Scott Riddell (c)	October 5, 1985 (aged 32)	Scotland 7s
2	BK	Darcy Graham	June 21, 1997 (aged 20)	Edinburgh
3	FW	Lee Jones	June 28, 1988 (aged 29)	Glasgow Warriors
4	BK	Glenn Bryce	June 7, 1991 (aged 26)	Edinburgh
5	BK	George Horne	May 12, 1995 (aged 22)	Glasgow Warriors
6	FW	Joe Nayacavou	May 29, 1985 (aged 32)	Scotland 7s
7	FW	Jamie Farndale	February 21, 1994 (aged 24)	Scotland 7s
8	FW	Nyle Godsmark	April 10, 1992 (aged 26)	Scotland 7s
9	BK	Robbie Fergusson	August 30, 1993 (aged 24)	London Scottish
10	BK	Ruaridh Jackson	February 12, 1988 (aged 30)	Glasgow Warriors
11	BK	James Fleming	October 15, 1987 (aged 30)	Scotland 7s
12	BK	Max McFarland	July 11, 1993 (aged 24)	Glasgow Warriors
13	FW	Matt Fagerson	July 16, 1998 (aged 19)	Glasgow Warriors

=== Papua New Guinea ===
The following team was announced as the 2018 Commonwealth Games sevens team.

Head coach: Douglas Guise

No.	Pos.	Player	Date of birth (age)	Union / Club
1	FW	Eugene Tokavai	March 13, 1992 (aged 26)	
2	FW	Patrick Tatut	February 19, 1992 (aged 26)	
3	FW	Henry Kalua (c)	September 15, 1992 (aged 25)	
4	BK	Wesley Vali	January 14, 1994 (aged 24)	
5	BK	Emmanuel Guise	August 11, 1993 (aged 24)	
6	BK	Freddy Rova	January 12, 1996 (aged 22)	
7	FW	Samuel Malambes	January 1, 1996 (aged 22)	
8	BK	William Tirang	December 17, 1995 (aged 22)	
9	BK	Isaac Aquila	February 10, 1992 (aged 26)	
10	BK	Nathan Baramun	August 31, 1991 (aged 26)	
11	FW	Himah Alu	December 19, 1991 (aged 26)	
12	BK	Gairo Kapana	July 17, 1996 (aged 21)	

=== Malaysia ===
The following team was announced as the 2018 Commonwealth Games sevens team.

Head coach: Mohd Saizul Hafifi Md Noor

No.	Pos.	Player	Date of birth (age)	Union / Club
1	FW	Wan Izzuddin Ismail	February 2, 1994 (aged 24)	
2	FW	Mohamad Safwan Abdullah	July 7, 1993 (aged 24)	
3	BK	Muhammad Zulhisham Rasli	April 24, 1995 (aged 22)	
4	FW	Muhammad Siddiq Amir Jalil	February 15, 1993 (aged 25)	
5	FW	Nik Mohd Shahiddan Mohd Zain	March 13, 1993 (aged 25)	
6	BK	Mohamad Khairul Abdillah Ramli	July 8, 1992 (aged 25)	
7	BK	Zulkiflee Azmi	January 20, 1992 (aged 26)	
8	FW	Muhammad Zharif Affandi	January 10, 1993 (aged 25)	
9	BK	Muhammad Ameer Nasrun Zulkeffli	March 24, 1993 (aged 25)	
10	BK	Muhammad Azwan Zuwairi Mat Zizi	August 2, 1997 (aged 20)	
11		Muhammad Nasharuddin Ismail	August 19, 1992 (aged 25)	
12	BK	Muhamad Firdaus Tarmizi	August 18, 1994 (aged 23)	
13	BK	Muhammad Dzafran Muhamad Zainudin (reserve)	July 30, 1995 (aged 22)	

== Pool B ==
=== England ===
The following team was announced as the 2018 Commonwealth Games sevens team.

Head coach: Simon Amor

No.	Pos.	Player	Date of birth (age)	Union / Club
1	FW	Richard de Carpentier	April 30, 1990 (aged 27)	
2	FW	Mike Ellery	September 8, 1989 (aged 28)	
3	FW	Phil Burgess	July 1, 1988 (aged 29)	
4	BK	Dan Norton	March 22, 1988 (aged 30)	
5	FW	James Rodwell	August 23, 1984 (aged 33)	
6	BK	Tom Mitchell	July 22, 1989 (aged 28)	
7	BK	Dan Bibby	February 6, 1991 (aged 27)	
8	BK	Alex Davis	October 3, 1992 (aged 25)	
9	BK	Oliver Lindsay-Hague	October 8, 1990 (aged 27)	
10	BK	Ruaridh McConnochie	October 23, 1991 (aged 26)	(England) Bath
11	FW	Ethan Waddleton	November 23, 1996 (aged 21)	
12	BK	Harry Glover	December 31, 1995 (aged 22)	
13	FW	Charlie Hayter (reserve)	December 10, 1988 (aged 29)	

=== Australia ===
The following team was announced as the 2018 Commonwealth Games sevens team. Captain Lewis Holland was originally announced as a team player, however, was excluded due to injury, and replaced by Brandon Quinn. Replacement captain James Stannard was also ruled out after a skull fracture resulting from being attacked after a farewell dinner to departing coach Andy Friend.

Head coach: Andy Friend

No.	Pos.	Player	Date of birth (age)	Union / Club
1	BK	Charlie Taylor	July 25, 1995 (aged 22)	Manly
2	FW	Tom Connor	July 29, 1992 (aged 25)	Sydney Rays
3	FW	Sam Myers	May 25, 1990 (aged 27)	Norths
4	BK	Tom Lucas	November 23, 1993 (aged 24)	Sunnybank
5	BK	Brandon Quinn	January 28, 1994 (aged 24)	Australia 7s
6	BK	John Porch	March 4, 1994 (aged 24)	Norths
7	FW	Tim Anstee	May 19, 1997 (aged 20)	Eastwood
8	FW	Jesse Parahi (c)	July 29, 1989 (aged 28)	Norths
9	FW	Boyd Killingworth	April 6, 1992 (aged 26)	Warringah
10	BK	Ben O'Donnell	August 14, 1995 (aged 22)	Randwick
11	BK	Maurice Longbottom	January 30, 1995 (aged 23)	Australia 7s
12	FW	Lachlan Anderson	August 27, 1997 (aged 20)	Eastwood

=== Samoa ===
The following team was announced as the 2018 Commonwealth Games sevens team.

Head coach: Gordon Tietjens

No.	Pos.	Player	Date of birth (age)	Union / Club
1	FW	Tofatu Solia	March 21, 1991 (aged 27)	
2	FW	Alamanda Motuga	September 11, 1994 (aged 23)	
3	BK	Laaloi Leilua	August 13, 1996 (aged 21)	
4	FW	Jacob Ale	August 16, 1992 (aged 25)	
5	BK	Neria Fomai	February 3, 1992 (aged 26)	
6	BK	Murphy Paulo	May 1, 1991 (aged 26)	
7	BK	Alatasi Tupou	April 21, 1988 (aged 29)	
8	BK	Tomasi Alosio	January 26, 1992 (aged 26)	
9	BK	Tila Mealoi (c)	June 28, 1991 (aged 26)	
10	BK	Elisapeta Alofipo	December 11, 1997 (aged 20)	
11	BK	Joe Perez	March 10, 1990 (aged 28)	
12	FW	David Afamasaga	July 29, 1994 (aged 23)	

=== Jamaica ===
The following team was announced as the 2018 Commonwealth Games sevens team.

Head coach: (Wales) Marcus Blackburn

No.	Pos.	Player	Date of birth (age)	Union / Club
1	FW	Lucas Roy-Smith	November 10, 1989 (aged 28)	
2	FW	Owen Linton	May 8, 1994 (aged 23)	
3	FW	Tyler Bush	May 13, 1996 (aged 21)	
4	BK	Marcus Webber (c)	October 29, 1993 (aged 24)	
5	FW	Gareth Stoppani	April 11, 1990 (aged 28)	
6	BK	Rhodri Adamson	October 29, 1993 (aged 24)	
7	BK	Conan Osborne	March 19, 1993 (aged 25)	
8	BK	Mikel Facey	June 30, 2000 (aged 17)	
9	BK	Ashley Smith	June 18, 1991 (aged 26)	
10	FW	Nyle Beckett	July 25, 1990 (aged 27)	
11	BK	Anthony Bingham	June 12, 1984 (aged 33)	
12	BK	Reinhardo Richards	November 17, 1993 (aged 24)	

== Pool C ==
=== New Zealand ===
The following team was announced as the 2018 Commonwealth Games sevens team.

Head coach: Clark Laidlaw

No.	Pos.	Player	Date of birth (age)	Union / Club
1	FW	Scott Curry (c)	May 17, 1988 (aged 29)	Bay of Plenty
2	FW	Tim Mikkelson	August 13, 1986 (aged 31)	Waikato
3	FW	Trael Joass	May 14, 1993 (aged 24)	Tasman
4	BK	Etene Nanai-Seturo	August 20, 1999 (aged 18)	
5	FW	Dylan Collier	April 27, 1991 (aged 26)	Waikato
6	BK	Vilimoni Koroi	April 17, 1998 (aged 19)	Otago
7	FW	Sam Dickson	October 28, 1989 (aged 28)	Canterbury
8	BK	Andrew Knewstubb	September 14, 1995 (aged 22)	Tasman
9	BK	Regan Ware	August 7, 1994 (aged 23)	Bay of Plenty
10	BK	Kurt Baker	October 7, 1988 (aged 29)	Manawatu
11		Akuila Rokolisoa	June 27, 1995 (aged 22)	
12	BK	Sione Molia	September 5, 1993 (aged 24)	Counties Manukau

=== Canada ===
The following team was announced as the 2018 Commonwealth Games sevens team.

Head coach: Damian McGrath

No.	Pos.	Player	Date of birth (age)	Union / Club
1	FW	Matt Mullins	July 28, 1994 (aged 23)	Canada 7s
2	BK	Admir Cejvanovic	June 26, 1990 (aged 27)	Canada 7s
3	FW	Mike Fuailefau	March 20, 1992 (aged 26)	Canada 7s
4	FW	John Moonlight (c)	July 2, 1987 (aged 30)	Canada 7s
5	BK	Andrew Coe	April 8, 1996 (aged 22)	Canada 7s
6	BK	Connor Braid	May 31, 1990 (aged 27)	Canada 7s
7	BK	Lucas Hammond	November 14, 1993 (aged 24)	Canada 7s
8	BK	Justin Douglas	April 5, 1994 (aged 24)	Canada 7s
9	BK	Nathan Hirayama	March 23, 1988 (aged 30)	Canada 7s
10	BK	Pat Kay	July 18, 1992 (aged 25)	Canada 7s
11	FW	Harry Jones	August 26, 1989 (aged 28)	Canada 7s
12	FW	Isaac Kaay	August 30, 1993 (aged 24)	Canada 7s

=== Kenya ===
The following was announced as the 2018 Commonwealth Games sevens team.

Head coach: Innocent Simiyu

No.	Pos.	Player	Date of birth (age)	Union / Club
1	BK	Arthur Owira	July 20, 1991 (aged 26)	(Kenya) KCB
2	FW	Daniel Sikuta	December 28, 1992 (aged 25)	(Kenya) Kabras Sugar
3	FW	Oscar Ouma (c)	May 3, 1989 (aged 28)	(Kenya) Nakuru
4	BK	Ian Minjire	June 3, 1992 (aged 25)	(Kenya) Impala Saracens
5	BK	Billy Odhiambo	November 7, 1993 (aged 24)	(Kenya) Mwamba
6	FW	Jeffery Oluoch	April 2, 1995 (aged 23)	(Kenya) Homeboyz
7	BK	Eden Agero	September 17, 1990 (aged 27)	(Kenya) SportPesa Quins
8	FW	Andrew Amonde	December 25, 1983 (aged 34)	(Kenya) KCB
9	FW	Nelson Oyoo	June 26, 1994 (aged 23)	(Kenya) Nakuru
10	BK	Samuel Oliech	December 15, 1993 (aged 24)	(Kenya) Impala Saracens
11	BK	Collins Injera	October 18, 1986 (aged 31)	(Kenya) Mwamba
12	FW	Willy Ambaka	May 14, 1990 (aged 27)	(Kenya) SportPesa Quins

=== Zambia ===
The following team was announced as the 2018 Commonwealth Games sevens team.

Head coach: Andrew Kaminsa

No.	Pos.	Player	Date of birth (age)	Union / Club
1	FW	Terry Kayamba	June 9, 1988 (aged 29)	
2	FW	Carlos Kanyama	October 4, 1991 (aged 26)	
3	FW	Israel Kalumba (c)	December 12, 1992 (aged 25)	
4	BK	Guy Lipschitz	April 2, 1985 (aged 33)	
5	BK	Laston Mukosa	September 10, 1992 (aged 25)	
6	FW	Fernard Kashimoto	July 31, 1991 (aged 26)	
7	BK	Edward Chimbukulu	June 1, 1994 (aged 23)	
8	BK	Edward Mumba	November 14, 1988 (aged 29)	
9	FW	Martin Chisanga	April 24, 1987 (aged 30)	
10	FW	Sheleni Michelo	July 3, 1988 (aged 29)	
11	BK	Larry Kaushiku	November 26, 1990 (aged 27)	
12	FW	Edmond Hamayuwa	January 14, 1998 (aged 20)	

== Pool D ==
=== Fiji ===
The following team was announced as the 2018 Commonwealth Games sevens team.

Head coach: Gareth Baber

No.	Pos.	Player	Date of birth (age)	Union / Club
1	BK	Sevuloni Mocenacagi	June 29, 1990 (aged 27)	Fiji 7s
2	BK	Josua Vakurunabili	June 10, 1992 (aged 25)	Fiji 7s
3	BK	Kalione Nasoko	December 2, 1990 (aged 27)	Fiji 7s
4	FW	Paula Dranisinukula	November 23, 1989 (aged 28)	Fiji 7s
5	FW	Semi Kunatani	October 27, 1990 (aged 27)	Toulouse
6	FW	Jasa Veremalua	May 29, 1988 (aged 29)	Fiji 7s
7	FW	Mesulame Kunavula	October 27, 1990 (aged 27)	Fiji 7s
8	BK	Vatemo Ravouvou	July 31, 1990 (aged 27)	Western Sydney Rams
9	BK	Jerry Tuwai (c)	March 23, 1989 (aged 29)	Fiji 7s
10	BK	Alasio Naduva	June 25, 1990 (aged 27)	Fiji 7s
11	BK	Eroni Sau	February 5, 1990 (aged 28)	Fiji 7s
12	BK	Amenoni Nasilasila	February 8, 1992 (aged 26)	Fiji 7s
13	BK	Samisoni Viriviri (Reserve)	April 25, 1988 (aged 29)	Fiji 7s

=== Wales ===
The following team was announced as the 2018 Commonwealth Games sevens team.

Head coach: Gareth Williams

No.	Pos.	Player	Date of birth (age)	Union / Club
1	BK	Luke Treharne	January 18, 1993 (aged 25)	Wales 7s
2	BK	Morgan Williams	December 28, 1995 (aged 22)	Scarlets
3	BK	Angus O'Brien	September 17, 1994 (aged 23)	Dragons
4	FW	Luke Morgan	May 16, 1992 (aged 25)	Wales 7s
5	FW	Owen Jenkins	July 20, 1993 (aged 24)	Cardiff Blues
6	BK	Tom Williams	April 2, 1991 (aged 27)	Scarlets
7	BK	Ethan Davies	February 28, 1992 (aged 26)	Wales 7s
8	FW	James Benjamin	February 21, 1994 (aged 24)	Dragons
9	FW	Adam Thomas (c)	August 22, 1986 (aged 31)	Pontypridd
10	FW	Justin Tipuric	August 6, 1989 (aged 28)	Ospreys
11	BK	Hallam Amos	September 24, 1994 (aged 23)	Dragons
12	FW	Ben Roach	January 30, 1994 (aged 24)	Dragons
13	FW	Harri Millard (reserve)	August 17, 1996 (aged 21)	Cardiff Blues

=== Uganda ===
The following team was announced as the 2018 Commonwealth Games sevens team.

Head coach: Tolbert Onyango

No.	Pos.	Player	Date of birth (age)	Union / Club
1	FW	Desire Ayera	January 9, 1999 (aged 19)	Uganda 7s
2	FW	Pius Ogena	October 30, 1994 (aged 23)	Uganda 7s
3	FW	James Odongo	August 20, 1989 (aged 28)	Uganda 7s
4	BK	Adrian Kasito	October 30, 1995 (aged 22)	Uganda 7s
5	BK	Philip Wokorach	December 31, 1993 (aged 24)	Uganda 7s
6	FW	Micheal Okorach (c)	August 14, 1990 (aged 27)	Uganda 7s
7	BK	Lawrence Ssebuliba	December 24, 1994 (aged 23)	Uganda 7s
8	BK	Ivan Magomu	September 6, 1993 (aged 24)	Black Pirates
9	BK	Joseph Aredo	November 4, 1992 (aged 25)	Uganda 7s
10	FW	Solomon Okia	October 14, 1996 (aged 21)	Uganda 7s
11	BK	Timothy Kisiga	December 2, 1996 (aged 21)	Black Pirates
12	BK	Aaron Ofoyrwoth	October 7, 1997 (aged 20)	Uganda 7s

=== Sri Lanka ===
The following team was announced as the 2018 Commonwealth Games sevens team.

Head coach: Peter Woods

No.	Pos.	Player	Date of birth (age)	Union / Club
1	BK	Naveen Henakankanamage	January 8, 1998 (aged 20)	
2	BK	Richard Dharmapala	January 14, 1994 (aged 24)	Kandy SC
3	BK	Anuradha Sooriyabandara	January 17, 1989 (aged 29)	
4	BK	Sudam Sooriyarachchi	December 12, 1995 (aged 22)	
5	BK	Kavindu Perera	December 7, 1993 (aged 24)	
6	BK	Danushka Wijekoon	June 2, 1993 (aged 24)	Kandy SC
7	FW	Rehan Silva	November 15, 1996 (aged 21)	
8	FW	Sudharshana Muthuthanthri (c)	August 25, 1991 (aged 26)	
9	FW	Dansha Chandradas	January 21, 1993 (aged 25)	
10	BK	Ashan Ratwatte	December 12, 1995 (aged 22)	
11	FW	Adeesha Weerathunga	July 27, 1996 (aged 21)	Navy SC
12	FW	Hirantha Perera	January 26, 1994 (aged 24)	
