= Rugby sevens at the 2022 Asian Games – Men's tournament =

Asian Games Rugby event

Men at the 2022 Asian Games
- Venue: Cangqian Athletics Field
- Date: 24–26 September 2023
- Competitors: 156 from 13 nations

Medalists
gold medal	Hong Kong
silver medal	South Korea
bronze medal	Japan

The men's tournament of rugby sevens at the 2022 Asian Games was held at the Cangqian Athletics Field, Hangzhou, China from 24 to 26 September 2023.

The Sri Lanka national team competed as Independent Athletes under the Olympic Council of Asia flag for this event.

== Squads ==
Afghanistan	China	Chinese Taipei	Hong Kong
Omar Slaimankhel; Sabir Slaimankhel; Sayear Slaimankhel; Mostafa Sayed; Abdul Bari Gazang; Aref Wardak; Ajmal Wardak; Zakir Slaimankhel; Bilal Slaimankhel; Jibran Safi; Jani Gazang; Mukhtar Baig Tatar	Gao Bing; Li Benshou; Li Haitao; Huang Aoqi; Shan Changshun; Liu Luda; Hu Zhenye; Zheng Zhiyuan; Wu Jiajun; Gao Yinghao; Wang Shuoshuo; Ma Chong	Yao Chih-yao; Wang Chih-wei; Chen Po-ting; Lai Kuang-hung; Chang Cheng-kang; Liu Yu-hung; Li Kuo-hsin; Wang Chia-hsien; Zhao Han-zheng; Hsieh Pin-yi; Sun Wei-chiang; Tang Pao-sheng	Max Woodward; Michael Coverdale; Alessandro Nardoni; Max Denmark; James Christie; Liam Doherty; Liam Herbert; Cado Lee; Hugo Stiles; Russell Webb; Salom Yiu; Alex McQueen
Independent Athletes	Japan	Malaysia	Nepal
Adeesha Weerathunga; Ravindu Anjula; Raveen de Silva; Kavindu de Costa; Tharinda Ratwatte; Adam Gauder; Gamunu Chethiya; Dinupa Senevirathne; Ramesh Fernando; Heshan Jansen; Akash Madusanka; Darshana Dabare	Kippei Ishida; Taichi Yoshizawa; Ryota Kano; Junya Matsumoto; Josua Kerevi; Moeki Fukushi; Kippei Taninaka; Yoshihiro Noguchi; Yu Okudaira; Takamasa Maruo; Taisei Hayashi; Taiga Ishida	Zulhisham Rasli; Shah Izwan Nordin; Kamal Hamidi Raihan; Hafiezie Sudin; Wan Azley Wan Omar; Safiy Said; Amirul Ramzan Amir; Harith Iqbal Anhar; Adam Ariff Alias; Azwan Zuwairi Mat Zizi; Ahmad Zulhilmi Azizad; Amalul Hazim Nasarrudin	Bibesh Basu; Jhukendra Rai; Shree Ram Shrestha; Birat Shrestha; Niroj Karki; Bikram Puri; Pujan Phewali; Nabin Maharjan; Yadu Adhikari; Bikram Bharati; Sujan Kumal; Sabin Mahat
Philippines	Singapore	South Korea	Thailand
Tommy Gilbert; Kai Stroem; Donald Coleman; Joe Dawson; Luc Smith; Jerome Rudder; Vincent Young; Raphael Barberis; Rob Fogerty; Nick Robertson; Justin Coveney; Rafael Phillips	Jonathan Wong; Sean Er; Farhan Amran; Cedric Teo; Hidayat Jeffrydin; Teng Chong Yao; Connor Postlethwaite; Ray Peh; Nicholas Yau; Adam Vine; Sean Andriesz; Umar Sha'ari	Kim Chan-ju; Lee Jin-kyu; Han Kun-kyu; Chang Yong-heung; Kim Nam-uk; Kim Hyun-soo; Jeong Yeon-sik; Park Wan-yong; Lee Geon; Hwang In-jo; Jang Jeong-min; Kim Eui-tae	Noppasit Kradkrayang; Witchaphol Dechmani; Chawakorn Siwapreechakul; Sarut Janda; Sada Terateanworakit; Pachara Polpathapee; Naphan Denlampai; Ratchanon Chitpavanasakul; Adithep Keatpattanachai; Thanachot Anekchin; Polsan Phaetrat; Thanakit Jakchai
United Arab Emirates			
Emosi Ratuvecanaua; Aidan Hertz; Ethan Matthews; Niko Volavola; Marcus Kruger; Sakiusa Naisau; Hannes Kruger; Blair Cochrane; Max Preston; Keanu Boucher; Thomas Battiston; Conor Kennedy			

== Results ==
All times are China Standard Time (UTC+08:00)

=== Pool round ===
==== Pool A ====
Pos	Team	Pld	W	D	L	PF	PA	PD	Pts	Qualification
1	Hong Kong	2	2	0	0	83	12	+71	6	Quarterfinals
2	Malaysia	2	1	0	1	31	47	−16	4	Quarterfinals
3	Philippines	2	0	0	2	12	67	−55	2	Placing 9–13

Source: OCA

24 September
10:00

Philippines	7–24	Malaysia
Try: Robertson 4' c Con: Smith (1/1)		Try: Nordin 7+' c Mat Zizi 8' c Azizad (2) 12' m, 14' m Con: Mat Zizi (2/2); Nasarrudin (0/1); Anhar (0/1)

Cangqian Athletics Field, Hangzhou
Referee: Ibuki Tetsuka (Japan)

24 September
13:20

Hong Kong	40–7	Malaysia
Try: Yiu (2) 5' c, 7+' c Coverdale 6' c Denmark (2) 10' c, 14+' m Herbert 13' c Con: Webb (5/6)		Try: Mat Zizi 8' c Con: Mat Zizi (1/1)

Cangqian Athletics Field, Hangzhou
Referee: Qu Shenggang (China)

24 September
18:30

Hong Kong	43–5	Philippines
Try: Christie 4' c Herbert (3) 5' c, 7+' c, 8' m Lee 10' m Yiu 12' c Doherty 14+' m Con: Stiles (3/5); Webb (1/2)		Try: Rudder 1' m Con: Smith (0/1)

Cangqian Athletics Field, Hangzhou
Referee: Ibuki Tetsuka (Japan)

==== Pool B ====
Pos	Team	Pld	W	D	L	PF	PA	PD	Pts	Qualification
1	South Korea	2	2	0	0	44	7	+37	6	Quarterfinals
2	Chinese Taipei	2	1	0	1	22	29	−7	4	Quarterfinals
3	Independent Athletes	2	0	0	2	14	44	−30	2	Placing 9–13

Source: OCA

24 September
10:25

Independent Athletes	7–22	Chinese Taipei
Try: Madusanka 5' c Con: Madusanka (1/1)		Try: Sun 2' m Li 7+' c Wang C.H. 11' m Zhao 13' m Con: Liu (1/4)

Cangqian Athletics Field, Hangzhou
Referee: Leow Wei Liang (Singapore)

24 September
13:45

South Korea	22–0	Chinese Taipei
Try: Kim H. 3' m Han 7' m Jang (2) 10' c, 13' m Con: Kim N. (1/3); Kim E. (0/1)

Cangqian Athletics Field, Hangzhou
Referee: Morgan White (Great Britain)

24 September
18:55

South Korea	22–7	Independent Athletes
Try: Jeong (3) 6' m, 7+' m, 11' m Chang 8' c Con: Kim E. (1/4)		Try: Anjula 3' c Con: Ratwatte (1/1)

Cangqian Athletics Field, Hangzhou
Referee: Qu Shenggang (China)

==== Pool C ====
Pos	Team	Pld	W	D	L	PF	PA	PD	Pts	Qualification
1	Japan	2	2	0	0	106	7	+99	6	Quarterfinals
2	Singapore	2	1	0	1	28	53	−25	4	Quarterfinals
3	Thailand	2	0	0	2	12	86	−74	2	Placing 9–13

Source: OCA

24 September
10:50

Singapore	21–12	Thailand
Try: Jeffrydin 4' c Wong 5' c Postlethwaite 10' c Con: Jeffrydin (2/2); Teng (1/1)		Try: Kradkrayang 2' m Terateanworakit 14' c Con: Anekchin (0/1); Terateanworakit (1/1)

Cangqian Athletics Field, Hangzhou
Referee: Craig Chan (Canada)

24 September
16:00

Japan	65–0	Thailand
Try: Fukushi (3) 2' m, 4' m, 7+' m T. Ishida (3) 5' c, 7' m, 9' m Noguchi 8' c Kano 12' m Taninaka (2) 13' c, 14' c K. Ishida 14+' c Con: Hayashi (1/5); Kano (3/4); T. Ishida (0/1); Taninaka (1/1)

Cangqian Athletics Field, Hangzhou
Referee: Leow Wei Liang (Singapore)

24 September
19:20

Japan	41–7	Singapore
Try: Okudaira (2) 1' m, 7' m Taninaka (3) 5' c, 6' m, 12' c Fukushi 14' c Maruo 14+' m Con: Noguchi (0/1); Taninaka (3/4); Kano (0/2)		Try: Jeffrydin 9' c Con: Jeffrydin (1/1)

Cangqian Athletics Field, Hangzhou
Referee: Morgan White (Great Britain)

==== Pool D ====
Pos	Team	Pld	W	D	L	PF	PA	PD	Pts	Qualification
1	China	3	3	0	0	159	10	+149	9	Quarterfinals
2	United Arab Emirates	3	2	0	1	96	54	+42	7	Quarterfinals
3	Afghanistan	3	1	0	2	46	83	−37	5	Placing 9–13
4	Nepal	3	0	0	3	7	161	−154	3	Placing 9–13

Source: OCA

24 September
11:15

China	52–0	Afghanistan
Try: Shan 1' c Gao B. 4' c Wu (2) 5' c, 7+' m Li H. 7' c Wang 9' c Hu 10' c Huang 14+' m Con: Shan (3/3); Wang (3/4); Wu (0/1)

Cangqian Athletics Field, Hangzhou
Referee: James Fairbourn (Great Britain)

24 September
11:40

United Arab Emirates	55–7	Nepal
Try: Volavola (2) 2' c, 6' c H. Kruger (2) 3' m, 14' m M. Kruger 7' m Preston 10' m Boucher 11' c Cochrane 12' c Battiston 14+' c Con: M. Kruger (2/4); Battiston (3/4); Kennedy (0/1)		Try: Phewali 5' c Con: Puri (1/1)

Cangqian Athletics Field, Hangzhou
Referee: Just Wang (Singapore)

24 September
16:25

China	65–0	Nepal
Try: Wu (3) 1' c, 2' m, 5' c Shan (2) 3' m, 8' m Zheng 6' m Li B. (3) 7' c, 10' m, 11' m Liu 14' c Ma 14+' c Con: Shan (1/6); Wang (3/4); Ma (1/1)

Cangqian Athletics Field, Hangzhou
Referee: James Fairbourn (Great Britain)

24 September
16:50

United Arab Emirates	31–5	Afghanistan
Try: Matthews 2' m Volavola (2) 4' c, 8' c M. Kruger 10' m Hertz 14' c Con: M. Kruger (2/4); Battiston (1/1)		Try: Safi 3' m Con: O. Slaimankhel (0/1)

Cangqian Athletics Field, Hangzhou
Referee: Ryoji Hirose (Japan)

24 September
19:45

Afghanistan	41–0	Nepal
Try: O. Slaimankhel 3' m Z. Slaimankhel (2) 5' c, 7' c Say. Slaimankhel 9' m Safi (2) 10' m, 12' c A. Gazang 14' m Con: A. Gazang (1/2); O. Slaimankhel (1/2); Safi (0/1); J. Gazang (1/2)

Cangqian Athletics Field, Hangzhou
Referee: Just Wang (Singapore)

24 September
20:10

United Arab Emirates	10–42	China
Try: Preston 6' m M. Kruger 14' m Con: M. Kruger (0/1); Kennedy (0/1)		Try: Shan (3) 2' c, 7+' c, 13' c Li H. 3' c Zheng 4' c Ma 11' c Con: Shan (5/5); Ma (1/1)

Cangqian Athletics Field, Hangzhou
Referee: Craig Chan (Canada)

=== Placing 9–13 ===
- The results and the points of the matches between the same teams that were already played during the pool round shall be taken into account for the placing round.

Pos	Team	Pld	W	D	L	PF	PA	PD	Pts
1	Philippines	4	3	0	1	125	21	+104	10 (Note: More than two teams are tied on match points, overall point difference was used as the tiebreaker.)
2	Independent Athletes	4	3	0	1	132	32	+100	10
3	Thailand	4	3	0	1	79	57	+22	10
4	Afghanistan	4	1	0	3	63	89	−26	6
5	Nepal	4	0	0	4	0	200	−200	4

Source: OCA
Notes:

25 September
10:00

Thailand	0–38	Philippines
		Try: Stroem 3' m Coleman 4' c Coveney 6' c Robertson 7+' m Gilbert 9' c Smith 14' c Con: Smith (2/4); Stroem (2/2)

Cangqian Athletics Field, Hangzhou
Referee: Leow Wei Liang (Singapore)

25 September
13:20

Philippines	55–0	Nepal
Try: Phillips 1' c Fogerty (2) 3' c, 6' m Stroem 5' m Barberis (2) 7+' m, 10' m Coleman 9' c Smith 11' c Rudder 14' c Con: Stroem (2/5); Smith (3/4)

Cangqian Athletics Field, Hangzhou
Referee: James Fairbourn (Great Britain)

25 September
13:45

Independent Athletes	36–10	Afghanistan
Try: Weerathunga 2' m Chethiya (2) 6' c, 8' m Gauder 9' m de Silva (2) 11' c, 14+' c Con: Gauder (0/1); Madusanka (1/1); Fernando (0/1); Ratwatte (1/2) de Silva (1/1)		Try: O. Slaimankhel 4' m Sayed 7+' m Con: O. Slaimankhel (0/1); A. Gazang (0/1)

Cangqian Athletics Field, Hangzhou
Referee: Just Wang (Singapore)

25 September
17:15

Philippines	12–21	Independent Athletes
Try: Robertson 3' c Coleman 11' m Con: Smith (1/2)		Try: Gauder 1' c Fernando 5' c Jansen 8' c Con: Madusanka (1/1); Ratwatte (1/1); Jansen (1/1)

Cangqian Athletics Field, Hangzhou
Referee: Qu Shenggang (China)

25 September
17:40

Nepal	0–36	Thailand
		Try: Janda 1' m Keatpattanachai 3' c Jakchai 4' m Phaetrat 7' c Kradkrayang 8' c Polpathapee 11' m Con: Keatpattanachai (2/4); Chitpavanasakul (1/1); Anekchin (0/1)

Cangqian Athletics Field, Hangzhou
Referee: Noor Jefri Mustafa (Malaysia)

26 September
11:40

Thailand	33–12	Afghanistan
Try: Kradkrayang (2) 2' c, 10' c Dechmani (2) 5' m, 7' c Terateanworakit 6' c Con: Keatpattanachai (3/4); Chitpavanasakul (1/1)		Try: A. Gazang 8' c Safi 14+' m Con: O. Slaimankhel (1/1); Ar. Wardak (0/1)

Cangqian Athletics Field, Hangzhou
Referee: James Fairbourn (Great Britain)

26 September
12:05

Independent Athletes	68–0	Nepal
Try: de Costa (2) 1' c, 11' c Weerathunga 2' c Anjula (2) 4' c, 7' c Ratwatte 5' c Fernando 7+' c Dabare (2) 9' c, 14+' c Senevirathne 10' m Con: Ratwatte (4/4); Weerathunga (1/1) de Costa (3/3); Dabare (0/1); Senevirathne (1/1)

Cangqian Athletics Field, Hangzhou
Referee: Ryoji Hirose (Japan)

26 September
16:00

Philippines	20–0; Awarded	Afghanistan

Cangqian Athletics Field, Hangzhou

- Afghanistan had to withdraw due to high number of injuries.

26 September
16:25

Thailand	10–7	Independent Athletes
Try: Keatpattanachai 3' m Kradkrayang 9' m Con: Keatpattanachai (0/1); Anekchin (0/1)		Try: Gauder 5' c Con: Ratwatte (1/1)

Cangqian Athletics Field, Hangzhou
Referee: Just Wang (Singapore)

=== Final round ===
Quarterfinals
25 September
Hong Kong	42
Chinese Taipei	5
25 September
Japan	28
United Arab Emirates	14
25 September
South Korea	26
Malaysia	5
25 September
China	36
Singapore	17

Semifinals
26 September
Hong Kong (aet)	12
Japan	7
26 September
South Korea	36
China	7

Gold medal match
26 September
Hong Kong	14
South Korea	7
Bronze medal match
26 September
Japan	21
China	19

Placing 5–8
26 September
Chinese Taipei	0
United Arab Emirates	42
26 September
Malaysia	33
Singapore	7

Placing 5–6
26 September
United Arab Emirates	28
Malaysia	14
Placing 7–8
26 September
Chinese Taipei	12
Singapore	19

==== Quarterfinals ====
25 September
11:40

Hong Kong	42–5	Chinese Taipei
Try: Webb 2' c Denmark 7+' c Doherty 8' c Stiles 10' c Nardoni 14' c Yiu 14+' c Con: Webb (3/3); Stiles (2/2); Yiu (1/1)		Try: Sun 6' m Con: Liu (0/1)

Cangqian Athletics Field, Hangzhou
Referee: Ibuki Tetsuka (Japan)

25 September
12:05

South Korea	26–5	Malaysia
Try: Kim E. 1' m Jang (2) 5' c, 13' c Kim N. 9' c Con: Kim E. (2/3); Kim N. (1/1)		Try: Azizad 12' m Con: Mat Zizi (0/1)

Cangqian Athletics Field, Hangzhou
Referee: Qu Shenggang (China)

25 September
12:30

Japan	28–14	United Arab Emirates
Try: Hayashi (2) 4' c, 13' c Matsumoto 6' c Maruo 11' c Con: Noguchi (2/2); Hayashi (2/2)		Try: Boucher 1' c Naisau 9' c Con: Naisau (1/1); M. Kruger (1/1)

Cangqian Athletics Field, Hangzhou
Referee: Craig Chan (Canada)

25 September
12:55

China	36–17	Singapore
Try: Shan 3' c Zheng 4' m Gao B. 7' m Wu 7+' c Hu 10' c Wang 12' m Con: Shan (1/2); Wang (1/2); Ma (1/2)		Try: Andriesz 8' m Wong 13' c Jeffrydin 14+' m Con: Jeffrydin (0/1); Teng (1/1); Vine (0/1)

Cangqian Athletics Field, Hangzhou
Referee: Morgan White (Great Britain)

==== Placing 5–8 ====
26 September
10:00

Chinese Taipei	0–42	United Arab Emirates
		Try: Ratuvecanaua 2' m Hertz (2) 4' c, 9' m Boucher (2) 5' m, 7' m Kennedy 11' m H. Kruger 13' m M. Kruger 14' m Con: Naisau (1/3); M. Kruger (0/3); Kennedy (0/1)

Cangqian Athletics Field, Hangzhou
Referee: Ibuki Tetsuka (Japan)

26 September
10:25

Malaysia	33–7	Singapore
Try: Mat Zizi (3) 3' c, 6' m, 9' c Sudin 4' c Rasli 14' c Con: Mat Zizi (2/3); Amir (2/2)		Try: Jeffrydin 12' c Con: Teng (1/1)

Cangqian Athletics Field, Hangzhou
Referee: Morgan White (Great Britain)

==== Semifinals ====
26 September
10:50

Hong Kong	12–7 (a.e.t.)	Japan
Try: Christie 14+' c Denmark 19' m Con: Webb (1/1)		Try: Fukushi 7+' c Con: Noguchi (1/1)

Cangqian Athletics Field, Hangzhou
Referee: Leow Wei Liang (Singapore)

26 September
11:15

South Korea	36–7	China
Try: Chang (2) 1' m, 7' m Jeong (2) 4' c, 6' c Jang (2) 12' c, 14+' c Con: Kim N. (3/5); Kim E. (0/1)		Try: Li H. 9' c Con: Ma (1/1)

Cangqian Athletics Field, Hangzhou
Referee: Craig Chan (Canada)

==== Placing 7–8 ====
26 September
12:55

Chinese Taipei	12–19	Singapore
Try: Li 7' c Zhao 11' m Con: Yao (1/2)		Try: Amran 2' c Wong 4' c Yau 8' m Con: Jeffrydin (2/3)

Cangqian Athletics Field, Hangzhou
Referee: Qu Shenggang (China)

==== Placing 5–6 ====
26 September
13:20

United Arab Emirates	28–14	Malaysia
Try: Volavola (3) 1' c, 9' c, 11' c Hertz 3' c Con: Naisau (2/2); Battiston (1/1); M. Kruger (1/1)		Try: Mat Zizi 5' c Rasli 7+' c Con: Mat Zizi (2/2)

Cangqian Athletics Field, Hangzhou
Referee: Ibuki Tetsuka (Japan)

==== Bronze medal match ====
26 September
17:15

Japan	21–19	China
Try: Yoshizawa 2' c Maruo 8' c Taninaka 14+' c Con: Kano (2/2); Noguchi (1/1)		Try: Wang 4' c Zheng 5' c Ma 14' m Con: Shan (2/3)

Cangqian Athletics Field, Hangzhou
Referee: Morgan White (Great Britain)

==== Gold medal match ====
26 September
18:05

Hong Kong	14–7	South Korea
Try: Lee 7' c Doherty 8' c Con: Webb (2/2)		Try: Chang 10' c Con: Kim E. (1/1)

Cangqian Athletics Field, Hangzhou
Referee: Leow Wei Liang (Singapore)

== Final standing ==
Rank	Team	Pld	W	D	L
1st place, gold medalist(s)	Hong Kong	5	5	0	0
2nd place, silver medalist(s)	South Korea	5	4	0	1
3rd place, bronze medalist(s)	Japan	5	4	0	1
4	China	6	4	0	2
5	United Arab Emirates	6	4	0	2
6	Malaysia	5	2	0	3
7	Singapore	5	2	0	3
8	Chinese Taipei	5	1	0	4
9	Philippines	6	3	0	3
10	Independent Athletes	6	3	0	3
11	Thailand	6	3	0	3
12	Afghanistan	6	1	0	5
13	Nepal	6	0	0	6
