= Independent Athletes at the 2022 Asian Games =

Neutral athletes; Sri Landa national rugby sevens team

Independent Athletes competed at the 2022 Asian Games in Hangzhou, China from September 23 to October 8, 2023. The delegation, competing as neutrals under the Olympic Council of Asia flag, consist of the Sri Lanka national rugby sevens team whose federation was suspended by the World Rugby.

== Rugby sevens ==
Team	Event	Group Stage			Classification round 9–13th					Rank
Team	Event	Opposition Score	Opposition Score	Rank	Opposition Score	Opposition Score	Opposition Score	Opposition Score	Rank	Rank
OCA men's	Men's tournament	Chinese Taipei; L 7–22	South Korea; L 7–22	3	Afghanistan; W 36–10	Philippines; W 21–12	Nepal; L 68–0	Thailand; L 7–10	2	10

Sri Lanka entered a men's rugby sevens team. World Rugby allowed the team to compete, even though the Sri Lankan Rugby Federation was suspended. The team was allowed to compete under the Olympic Council of Asia flag.

The 12 member team was officially named on July 28, 2023.

Roster

- Tharinda Ratwatte
- Adeesha Weeratunga
- Chathura Senevirathne
- Anjala Hettiarachchi
- Aakash Madushanka
- Dinupa Senevirathne
- Gemunu Chethiya
- Dharshana Dabare
- Srinath Sooriyabandara
- Ramesh Fernando
- Heshan Jensen
- Adam Gauder

== See also ==
- Sri Lanka at the 2022 Asian Games (Other Sri Lankan athletes)
