= Clark Laidlaw =

- Born: 16 July 1977 (age 49) Jedburgh, Scottish Borders, Scotland
- Notable relatives: Roy Laidlaw (father); Greig Laidlaw (cousin)

Rugby union career
Senior career
Years	Team	Apps	(Points)
- Border Reivers
National sevens team
Years	Team		Comps
2001–2007	Scotland		93
Coaching career
- Years: Team
- 2013–2015: Hurricanes (Assistant coach)
- 2015–2016: London Irish (Assistant coach)
- 2017–2023: New Zealand Sevens
- 2023: New Zealand U20
- 2024–present: Hurricanes
Medal record
Men's rugby sevens (as coach)
Representing New Zealand
Summer Olympics
Silver medal – second place	2020 Tokyo	Squad
Commonwealth Games
Gold medal – first place	2018 Gold Coast	Squad
Bronze medal – third place	2022 Birmingham	Squad

Clark Laidlaw (born 16 July 1977) is a Scottish professional rugby union coach and former player. He is currently the head coach of the Hurricanes in Super Rugby, becoming coach of the team in late 2023 ahead of the 2024 season. Laidlaw was the New Zealand Sevens head coach before stepping down in 2023.

== Biography ==
Laidlaw is the son of former Scotland and British Lions player Roy Laidlaw. His cousin, Greig Laidlaw, also represented Scotland and the Lions. He represented Scotland internationally in rugby sevens and moved to New Zealand in 2008.

In 2025, Laidlaw became a New Zealand citizen.

== Coaching career ==
Laidlaw became the skills coach for Taranaki in 2010 then became the skills coach and video analyst with the New Zealand sevens team under Sir Gordon Tietjens from 2010 to 2012. He made the move back to the 15-a-side game, as the assistant coach of the Hurricanes from 2013 to 2015. He was also assistant coach of London Irish.

In 2018, a year after becoming head coach of New Zealand sevens, the team won gold at the 2018 Commonwealth Games and the 2018 Rugby World Cup Sevens.

In 2020, Laidlaw guided New Zealand to win the World Rugby Sevens Series and in 2021, a silver medal at the Tokyo Olympics.

In 2023 it was announced that Laidlaw would be stepping down as the New Zealand head coach and joining the Hurricanes as head coach from 2024.

== Awards and honours ==
=== As Coach ===
New Zealand Sevens

- Commonwealth Games: 2018, 2022 (Bronze)
- Rugby World Cup Sevens: 2018, 2022 (Silver)
- World Rugby Sevens Series: 2019–20, 2022–23 (Note: Laidlaw was coach of the team for majority of the 2022–23 series, however, left to take up a role with the New Zealand U20 team before the final event in London.)
- Summer Olympics: 2020 (Silver)
- Oceania Sevens: 2022

Hurricanes

- Super Rugby Pacific: 2026
