= 2014 Clifford Cup =

Tournament details
- Tournament format(s): Knockout
- Date: 27 February 2014 – 5 March 2014

Tournament statistics
- Teams: 8
- Matches played: 7

Final
- Champions: Navy SC (1st title)
- Runners-up: Havelock Sports Club

The 79th Clifford Cup tournament was held between the 27 February and the 5 March 2014. The change in dates from the competition's traditional dates in the September/October period, resulted in there being no competition being played in 2013.

The final of the competition was held at Colombo Racecourse Sports Complex on the 5 March 2014 between Navy SC and Havelock SC. The last time these two teams met in a Clifford Cup final was in 1976, where it was the first time that Navy SC had played in a cup final and it was Havelock SC's tenth appearance. That game was won by Havelock SC, 15 points to 3. The last time Havelock Sports Club won the Clifford Cup was in 1981, whilst Navy had never won the cup. Havelock SC dominated the first half and went into the break with a lead of 19-3. Navy SC made a stunning comeback in the second half of the game to defeat Havelock SC by 27 (3 converted tries and two penalties) to 22 (three tries, two conversions and a penalty). Navy SC fullback Nuwan Hettiarachchi won the player-of-the-tournament award.

== Seedings ==
The seeding is based upon the teams standings at the end of the 2013-14 Dialog Rugby League season. The first six seeds represent the teams in the Cup section of the league and the seventh and eighth seeds are the first two teams in the Plate section of the league.

1. Navy SC
2. Kandy SC
3. Havelock SC
4. Up Country Lions
5. Ceylonese R & FC
6. Army SC
7. Police SC
8. Air Force SC

== Quarter finals ==
27 February 2014
18:30

Navy SC	55 – 3	Air Force SC

Colombo Racecourse Sports Complex
Referee: Eric Soulan

28 February 2014
18:30

Up Country Lions	51 – 19	Ceylonese Rugby & Football Club

Colombo Racecourse Sports Complex
Referee: Eric Soulan

1 March 2014
16:30

Kandy SC	41 – 30	Police SC

Pallekele

1 March 2014
18:30

Havelock SC	29 - 14	Army SC

Colombo Racecourse Sports Complex
Referee: Eric Soulan

== Semi finals ==
4 March 2014
18:30

Navy SC	35 – 25	Up Country Lions

Colombo Racecourse Sports Complex
Referee: Eric Soulan

5 March 2014
18:30

Kandy SC	16 - 22	Havelock SC

Colombo Racecourse Sports Complex
Referee: Eric Soulan

== Final ==
5 March 2014
18:30

Navy SC	27 - 22	Havelock SC

Colombo Racecourse Sports Complex
Referee: Mark Jackson
