= Jason Dissanayake =

Sri Lankan rugby sevens player

Jason Dissanayake (born 1 October 1993) is a Sri Lankan rugby sevens player who predominantly plays as a flanker.

== Career ==
He made his rugby debut when he was studying at the Vidyartha College. He was subsequently appointed as captain of his Vidyartha College rugby team in 2012.

He was named in the Sri Lankan contingent for the 2011 Commonwealth Youth Games and he represented the Sri Lankan national youth rugby sevens team in the rugby sevens tournament held in the Isle of Men.

Soon after completing his schooling, he plied his trade in club rugby and he eventually made his club debut playing for Sri Lanka Navy Sports Club. He also went onto play for Ceylonese Rugby & Football Club for a brief stint. He made his senior international debut for Sri Lanka 7's during the 2013 HSBC Asian Sevens Series in Mumbai.

Jason was apparently signed up by Kandy Sports Club ahead of the 2016/17 Dialog Club Rugby season. However, Jason faced jeopardy over making his immediate availability for Kandy Sports Club due to a contract dispute he had with his incumbent club, Ceylonese Rugby & Football Club. In November 2017, he was released by Ceylonese Rugby & Football Club to allow him to play for Kandy Sports Club.

He was named in the Sri Lankan squad for the Monaco Olympic Qualifier Sevens series which was conducted as an Olympic Repachage Tournament by World Rugby to determine the last slot for the 12 team men's rugby sevens tournament for the 2016 Summer Olympics in Rio de Janeiro.

Jason was an integral member of the Sri Lankan rugby sevens side, which emerged as runners-up to Hong Kong at the 2016 Hong Kong Asian Sevens, where Sri Lanka lost the final by the barest of all margins with a scoreline of 22–17 in favor of Hong Kong. Jason crossed the try-scoring line on four occasions during the final of the 2016 Hong Kong Asian Sevens to give Sri Lanka an outside chance to nearly pull off a memorable victory.

He was also included in Sri Lankan squad for the 2017 Asia Rugby Sevens Series. In April 2017, he was named in the Sri Lanka Tuskers squad ahead of the 2017 World Series Qualifiers in Hong Kong. He was included in the Sri Lankan contingent for the 2018 Asian Games and he took part in the men's rugby sevens tournament with the Sri Lankan rugby sevens side. He secured his spot in the national squad ahead of the 2018 Asia Rugby Sevens Series.
