= 2012 Clifford Cup =

Tournament details
- Tournament format(s): Knockout
- Date: 28 September 2012 – 7 October 2012

Tournament statistics
- Teams: 8
- Matches played: 7

Final
- Champions: Kandy SC (18th title)
- Runners-up: Havelock Sports Club

The 78th Clifford Cup tournament was held between the 28 September and 7 October 2012.

The cup final was held on the same day, 7 October 2012, as the final of the 2012 T20 World Cup (which was played at R. Premadasa Stadium in Colombo, between Sri Lanka and West Indies), this resulted in lower crowds than normally experienced at previous Clifford Cup finals. The game was played at Bogambara Stadium instead of Nittawela Rugby Stadium. Havelock SC came into the final after securing the 2012 Rugby League title, having edged out Kandy SC. Kandy SC were the current cup holders, having had won the cup for the previous five years, while Havelock SC's last win was 31 years earlier, in 1981. Kandy SC applied constant pressure during the first half, with a momentary lapse allowing Havelock SC to score before half time, resulting in a 7-5 scoreline. After the break both sides fought hard with only Kandy SC making a dent on the scoreboard eventually winning the game, 10 points (1 converted try and one penalty) to 5 (one unconverted try).

== Seedings ==
The seeding is based upon the teams standings at the end of the 2012 Dialog Rugby League season. The first four seeds represent the four teams in the cup section of the league and the remaining four seeds are the first four teams in the plate section of the league.

1. Havelock SC
2. Kandy SC
3. Navy
4. Up Country Lions
5. Army SC
6. Police SC
7. Ceylonese R & FC
8. Air Force SC

== Quarter finals ==
28 September 2012
18:30

Havelock SC	47 – 5	Air Force SC

Havelock Park

29 September 2012

Kandy SC	83 – 5	Ceylonese Rugby & Football Club

Bogambara Stadium

29 September 2012

Navy SC	21 – 23	Police SC

Havelock Park
Referee: Pradeep Fernando

30 September 2012

Up Country Lions	33 - 10	Army SC

Havelock Park
Attendance: Eron Littlewood

== Semi finals ==
3 October 21012
16:30

Havelock SC	32 – 31	Up Country Lions

Havelock Park

4 October 2012

Kandy SC	53 - 8	Police SC

Bogambara Stadium

== Final ==
7 October 2012
16:30

Kandy SC	10 - 5	Havelock SC

Bogambara Stadium
Attendance: 2,000
Referee: Paul MacKay
