= Chang Yong-heung =

South Korean rugby sevens player

- Born: 12 November 1993 (age 33)
- Height: 175 cm (5 ft 9 in)
- Weight: 81 kg (179 lb; 12 st 11 lb)

Rugby union career
- Position: Wing
Senior career
Years	Team	Apps	(Points)
2020–2024	Urayasu D-Rocks		(0)
National sevens team
Years	Team		Comps
- South Korea
Medal record
Men's rugby sevens
Representing South Korea
Asian Games
Silver medal – second place	2022 Hangzhou	Team
Bronze medal – third place	2018 Jakarta–Palembang	Team

Chang Yong-heung (born 12 November 1993) is a South Korean rugby sevens player. He competed for South Korea at the 2020 Summer Olympics.

== Rugby career ==
Chang competed for South Korea in the men's sevens tournament at the 2020 Summer Olympics in Tokyo. He also represented South Korea at the 2022 Rugby World Cup Sevens in Cape Town, South Africa.

He appeared on the reality show Physical: 100 in Season 2, however, he left the show before the eighth episode as he chose to lead the South Korean sevens squad to the delayed 2022 Asian Games in 2023. He eventually won a silver medal at the Games.

He previously played for Japanese club, Urayasu D-Rocks, in the Rugby League One competition. He also featured on Netflix's Korean reality show, Rugged Rugby: Conquer or Die in December 2024.
