= Up Country Lions =

Sri Lankan rugby union club, based in Kandy District

(Sri Lanka) Up Country Lions
- Union: Sri Lanka Rugby Football Union
- Founded: 2012; 14 years ago
- Location: Sri Lanka
- Region: Kandy District
- Ground(s): Jayathilake Stadium, Nawalapitiya (Capacity: 5,000)
- Chairman: Siva Subramaniam
- Coach: Imthisan Marikkar
- Captain: Srinath Sorriyabandara
- League(s): Dialog Rugby League; Clifford Cup; Dialog Club Rugby Sevens
- 2013/14 Dialog Rugby League season: 4

Up Country Lions were a Division 'A' rugby union team based in Sri Lanka, competing in the Dialog Rugby League.

The Up Country Lions Sports Club was launched on 3 January 2012 at Galle Face Hotel, Colombo. The 40 players announced on the playing list, included a number of national, youth and international capped players. Other announcements were that the coach of the team would be former Air Force SC and National 7s coach, Imthisan Marikkar, the club chairman, Siva Subramanium, team manager, former Isipatana Rugby Chairman, Hassan Sinhawansa, and the assistant manager Nilhar Nawaz.

The principal team sponsor was Crysbro, a leading poultry company based in Nawalapitiya.

The team's debut match in the Dialog Rugby League was on 10 June 2012 against Kandy SC, losing 26 points to 11, at Nittawela rugby stadium. In their next game the Up Country Lions registered their maiden victory overcoming CH & FC by a convincing margin 42-10. They finished the season in fourth place and reached the semi-finals of the Clifford Cup, losing a close match 33 points to 32 against Havelock Sports Club.

In 2013 they won the Dialog Club Rugby Sevens, defeating Havelock Sports Club by a margin of 14 points to 12 in the final, having maintained an unbeaten record throughout the tournament.

The following season they again finished in fourth place and reached the semi-finals of the Clifford Cup, losing to eventual cup holders, Navy SC 35 points to 25.

In May 2014 the club decided to withdraw from the competition and close the club permanently.
