= Pushpakumara =

Pushpakumara is both a given name and a surname. Notable people with the name include:

- Pushpakumara Serasinghe (born 1963), Sri Lankan cricketer
- Jagath Pushpakumara, Sri Lankan politician
- Kamal Pushpakumara, Sri Lankan cricketer
- Malinda Pushpakumara (born 1987), Sri Lankan cricketer
- Muthumudalige Pushpakumara (born 1981), Sri Lankan cricketer
- Ravindra Pushpakumara (born 1975), Sri Lankan cricketer
- Rohana Pushpakumara, Sri Lankan politician
- Sanjeewa Pushpakumara (born 1977), Sri Lankan film director
- Viraj Pushpakumara (born 1987), Sri Lankan cricketer
