= Dansha Dayan =

Sri Lankan rugby sevens player

- Born: 21 January 1993 (age 33)

Rugby union career
- Position: fullback
Senior career
Years	Team	Apps	(Points)
2012-2022	Kandy SC		
2022-present	Ceylonese Rugby & Football Club		
International career
Years	Team	Apps	(Points)
–	Sri Lanka		
National sevens team
Years	Team		Comps
- Sri Lanka

Dansha Dayan Chandradas also known as Dansha Chandradas (born 21 January 1993) is a Sri Lankan rugby union and rugby sevens player who currently plays as a fullback.

== Career ==
He played a pivotal and integral role for Kandy SC club for nearly 10 years from 2012 to 2022. He joined Kandy SC as a schoolboy in 2012.

He was named in Sri Lankan men's rugby sevens squads for both the 2018 Commonwealth Games and 2018 Asian Games. Sri Lanka would eventually finish at fourth position in men's rugby sevens tournament during the 2018 Asian Games thereby narrowly missing out on a bronze medal after going down 36–14 to South Korea in bronze medal 3rd place match while Sri Lanka finished at fifteenth position in men's rugby sevens tournament at the 2018 Commonwealth Games.

He was appointed as the captain of the Sri Lankan rugby sevens team for the 2019 Asia Rugby Sevens Series. The COVID-19 pandemic took an enormous heavy toll in his professional career especially he missed out the opportunity of representing Sri Lanka at the 2021 Asian Rugby Sevens Championship in UAE due to the fact that Kandy SC had failed to participate in selection trials at that time. He also went onto start on a welding business alongside his father. He faced discrimination and ill-treatment during his stint with Kandy SC and he parted ways with the club in 2022 after a decade.

He was included in 110 member Sri Lankan contingent for the 2022 Commonwealth Games.
