= Takamasa Maruo =

Japanese rugby sevens player

- Born: 8 January 1999 (age 27)
- Height: 183 cm (6 ft 0 in)
- Weight: 100 kg (220 lb; 15 st 10 lb)

Rugby union career
- Position(s): Flanker, Number 8
National sevens team
Years	Team	Comps
–Present	Japan	20

Takamasa Maruo (丸尾崇真, born 8 January 1999) is a Japanese rugby sevens player. He competed for Japan at the 2024 Summer Olympics in Paris.
