= Moeki Fukushi =

Japanese rugby sevens player

- Born: 11 March 1999 (age 27)
- Height: 184 cm (6 ft 0 in)
- Weight: 100 kg (220 lb; 15 st 10 lb)

Rugby union career
- Position(s): Wing, Centre
- Current team: Hino Red Dolphins
Senior career
Years	Team	Apps	(Points)
2021-	Hino Red Dolphins	26	(35)
International career
Years	Team	Apps	(Points)
2019	Japan U20		
National sevens team
Years	Team		Comps
2021–Present	Japan 7s		28

Moeki Fukushi (born 11 March 1999) is a Japanese rugby sevens player. He competed for Japan at the 2024 Summer Olympics in Paris.

Fukushi represented the Japanese under-20 side at the 2019 Under 20 Trophy tournament.
