= Jang Jeong-min =

South Korean rugby sevens player

- Born: 10 November 1994 (age 32)
- Height: 175 cm (5 ft 9 in)
- Weight: 77 kg (170 lb; 12 st 2 lb)

Rugby union career
- Position: Wing
International career
Years	Team	Apps	(Points)
2017–	South Korea		(0)
National sevens team
Years	Team		Comps
2017–	South Korea		
Medal record
Men's rugby sevens
Representing South Korea
Asian Games
Silver medal – second place	2022 Hangzhou	Team
Bronze medal – third place	2018 Jakarta–Palembang	Team

Jang Jeong-min (born 10 November 1994) is a South Korean rugby sevens player. He competed for South Korea at the 2020 Summer Olympics.

== Early career ==
Jang was in middle school when he discovered rugby and decided to join his school's rugby club. He continued playing rugby at Yonsei University.

== Rugby career ==
Jang was a member of the South Korean sevens team that competed at the delayed 2020 Summer Olympics in Tokyo. He also represented South Korea at the 2022 Rugby World Cup Sevens in Cape Town, South Africa.

In 2023, He was selected in the South Korean fifteens squad for the Asia Rugby Championship in June. Later in September that year, he competed in rugby sevens at the Asian Games in Hangzhou, China. He scored a brace of tries to help his side beat China in the semi-final and secure a spot in the gold medal playoff. They eventually won silver after their 14–7 loss to Hong Kong in the final.
