= Kim Nam-uk =

South Korean rugby sevens player

- Born: 5 February 1990 (age 36) Cheongju, South Korea
- Height: 179 cm (5 ft 10 in)
- Weight: 95 kg (209 lb; 14 st 13 lb)

Rugby union career
National sevens team
Years	Team	Comps
- South Korea
Medal record
Men's rugby sevens
Representing South Korea
Asian Games
Silver medal – second place	2022 Hangzhou	Team
Bronze medal – third place	2014 Incheon	Team
Bronze medal – third place	2018 Jakarta–Palembang	Team

Kim Nam-uk (born 5 February 1990) is a South Korean rugby sevens player. He competed in the men's tournament at the 2020 Summer Olympics. He also represented South Korea at the 2022 Rugby World Cup Sevens in Cape Town, South Africa.
