= Rugby sevens at the 2011 Commonwealth Youth Games =

The Rugby sevens competition at the 2011 Commonwealth Youth Games in Douglas, Isle of Man will be held in September 2011 at The Bowl Stadium.

== Qualification ==
A total of 8 teams will compete in this tournament. The host nations Isle of Man and Scotland as hosts of the 2014 Commonwealth Games get automatic entries into the tournament, along with the highest ranked nation of the Commonwealth's six regions (Africa, Americas, Asia, Caribbean, Europe and Oceania).

| Event | Vacancies | Qualified |
|---|---|---|
| Host Nation | 1 | Isle of Man |
| Automatic entry | 1 | Scotland |
| Africa | 1 | South Africa |
| Americas | 1 | Canada |
| Asia | 1 | Sri Lanka |
| Caribbean | 1 | Trinidad and Tobago |
| Europe | 1 | England |
| Oceania | 1 | Australia |
| Total | 8 | |

== Preliminary round ==
=== Group A ===
| Team | Pld | W | D | L | PF | PA | PD | Pts |
|---|---|---|---|---|---|---|---|---|
| Australia | 3 | 3 | 0 | 0 | 97 | 5 | +92 | 9 |
| Scotland | 3 | 2 | 0 | 1 | 63 | 38 | +25 | 7 |
| Canada | 3 | 1 | 0 | 2 | 65 | 46 | +19 | 5 |
| Isle of Man | 3 | 0 | 0 | 3 | 5 | 140 | −135 | 3 |

September 10, 2011
16:20

| Scotland | 43–5 | Isle of Man |
| | Report |

The Bowl Stadium, Douglas

September 10, 2011
16:41

| Australia | 31–0 | Canada |
| | Report |

The Bowl Stadium, Douglas

September 10, 2011
17:58

| Scotland | 15–14 | Canada |
| | Report |

The Bowl Stadium, Douglas

September 10, 2011
18:19

| Australia | 47–0 | Isle of Man |
| | Report |

The Bowl Stadium, Douglas

September 10, 2011
19:36

| Canada | 50–0 | Isle of Man |
| | Report |

The Bowl Stadium, Douglas

September 10, 2011
19:57

| Scotland | 5–19 | Australia |
| | Report |

The Bowl Stadium, Douglas

=== Group B ===
| Team | Pld | W | D | L | PF | PA | PD | Pts |
|---|---|---|---|---|---|---|---|---|
| England | 3 | 3 | 0 | 0 | 135 | 5 | +119 | 9 |
| South Africa | 3 | 2 | 0 | 1 | 129 | 7 | +122 | 7 |
| Sri Lanka | 3 | 1 | 0 | 2 | 17 | 129 | −114 | 5 |
| Trinidad and Tobago | 3 | 0 | 0 | 3 | 5 | 132 | −127 | 3 |

September 10, 2011
17:02

| England | 53–0 | Trinidad and Tobago |
| | Report |

The Bowl Stadium, Douglas

September 10, 2011
17:23

| South Africa | 62–0 | Sri Lanka |
| | Report |

The Bowl Stadium, Douglas

September 10, 2011
18:40

| England | 64–0 | Sri Lanka |
| | Report |

The Bowl Stadium, Douglas

September 10, 2011
19:01

| South Africa | 62–0 | Trinidad and Tobago |
| | Report |

The Bowl Stadium, Douglas

September 10, 2011
20:18

| South Africa | 5–7 | England |
| | Report |

The Bowl Stadium, Douglas

September 10, 2011
20:39

| Trinidad and Tobago | 5–17 | Sri Lanka |
| | Report |

The Bowl Stadium, Douglas

=== Knockout stage ===
September 11, 2011
15:50

| Australia | 53-0 | Trinidad and Tobago |

The Bowl Stadium, Douglas

September 11, 2011
16:11

| Isle of Man | 0-52 | England |

The Bowl Stadium, Douglas

September 11, 2011
16:32

| Scotland | 47-0 | Sri Lanka |

The Bowl Stadium, Douglas

September 11, 2011
16:53

| Canada | 12-24 | South Africa |

The Bowl Stadium, Douglas
