= Srinath Sooriyabandara =

Sri Lankan rugby union player (born 1989)

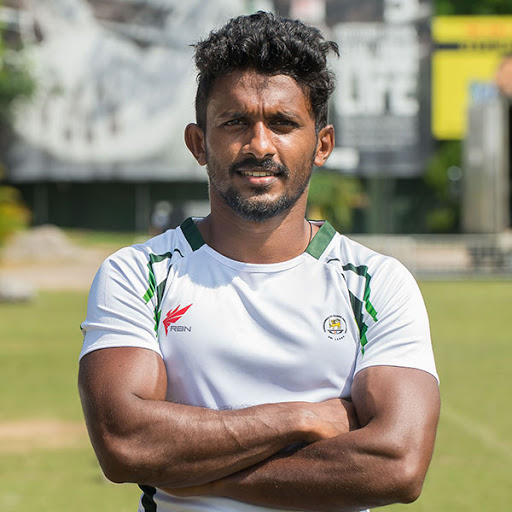
- Full name: Anuradha Srinath Sooriyabandara
- Born: 17 January 1989 (age 37) Colombo, Sri Lanka
- Height: 1.7 m (5 ft 7 in)
- Weight: 71 kg (157 lb; 11 st 3 lb)
- School: Isipathana College
- Occupation: Contracted Sportsman (Access Group of Companies)

Rugby union career
- Position(s): Scrum half, Fly-Half, Full-back
- Current team: Kandy SC
Senior career
Years	Team	Apps	(Points)
2009–2011	CR & FC	21	(35)
2012–2013	Up Country Lions	28	(37)
2014	Navy SC	14	(20)
2015-present	Kandy SC	47	(50)
- Correct as of 23 April 2020
International career
Years	Team	Apps	(Points)
2009-2014	Sri Lanka 15s	14	(5)
2014–2018	Sri Lanka Sevens	57	(122)
- Correct as of 23 April 2020

Srinath Sooriyabandara is a Sri Lankan rugby union player who currently plays for the Kandy SC in Dialog Rugby League. He represented Sri Lanka in the 15-man code between 2009 and 2014. He is also a vital part of the National Sevens Team since 2010 and was appointed as Captain of the team for the 2018 Asia Rugby Sevens Series. He usually plays at Scrum half, but due to his versatility he can also cover Fly-Half and Full-back.

He was a member of the Sri Lankan Sevens team that won the Shield Championship at the 2014 Commonwealth Games. He is the first and only Sri Lankan to compete at the Asian Games for three consecutive years.

== Rugby career ==
=== Youth ===
At school level, he played for Isipathana College Under 17, Under 18 and Under 19 Teams respectively. He played most of his school rugby at Full-back. Thanks to his nippy footwork and pace, Soori quickly caught the attention of major Pro-Rugby Clubs in the domestic league.

=== CR & FC ===
Right after school, Srinath Sooriyabandara joined CR & FC in 2009. He quickly started making a name for himself and soon became the club's first choice at Scrum Half. He played 3 seasons at the club.

=== Up Country Lions ===
In 2013, Soori announced that he has signed with the newly formed club Up Country Lions along with several high profiled domestic rugby players. He debuted for the Up Country Lions against Kandy Sports Club (rugby). In the following season, Srinath Sooriyabandara was appointed as the captain of the team and lead his team to a fourth-place finish in the Domestic Rugby League

=== Navy Sports Club ===
After the closure of Up Country Lions in 2014, Srinath Sooriyabandara moved to Navy SC. He was initially playing at Fly-Half in the place of the club's regular Fly-Half who was out injured. Once returned to his favored position, he was the club's first pick at Scrum-Half.

=== Kandy Sports Club ===
Srinath Sooriyabandara signed with the rugby powerhouse Kandy SC in 2015. He has been a regular at the club ever since.

== See also ==
- Rugby union in Sri Lanka
