= Jang Seong-min =

South Korean rugby sevens player

- Born: 22 August 1992 (age 34)
- Height: 187 cm (6 ft 2 in)
- Weight: 113 kg (249 lb; 17 st 11 lb)

Rugby union career
- Position: Wing
Senior career
| Years | Team | Apps | (Points) |
| 2017–2019 | NTT Docomo Red Hurricanes | | (0) |
International career
| Years | Team | Apps | (Points) |
| 2012–2021 | South Korea | | (0) |
National sevens team
| Years | Team | | Comps |
- South Korea

- Jang Seong-min
- Hangul: 장성민
- RR: Jang Seongmin
- MR: Chang Sŏngmin

Jang Seong-min (Korean: 장성민; born 22 August 1992) is a South Korean rugby sevens player. He competed for South Korea at the 2020 Summer Olympics.

== Rugby career ==
Jang played for the NTT Docomo Red Hurricanes in Japan from 2017 to 2019.

He was named MVP at the end of the 2020–2021 Korea Rugby League season. He competed in the men's sevens tournament at the delayed 2020 Summer Olympics in Tokyo.

== Personal life ==
Jang participated in the survival game show Physical: 100 in 2023. He was subsequently convicted of rape and sentenced to seven years in prison that year.
