= Sudharshana Muthuthanthri =

- Born: 25 August 1991 (age 35)
- Height: 5’ 03”
- Weight: 90 kg (198 lb)
- School: S. Thomas' College, Mount Lavinia

Rugby union career
- Position: Flanker
- Current team: Colombo Hockey and Football Club
Youth career
- S. Thomas' College, Mount Lavinia
Senior career
Years	Team	Apps	(Points)
2011-2015	Havelock Sports Club		
Provincial / State sides
Years	Team	Apps	(Points)
2018-	Auckland		
International career
Years	Team	Apps	(Points)
2014-present	Sri Lanka	1	

Sudharshana Muthuthanthri or Sudarshana Muthuthanthri (born 25 August 1991) is a Sri Lankan rugby player and the current captain of the Sri Lanka national rugby union team. He replaced former captain, Fazil Marija as the new skipper of the Sri Lankan rugby union team in 2015.

He played schoolboy rugby at S. Thomas' College, Mount Lavinia between 2009-2010 as a flanker. He then went on to play for Havelock Sports Club where he became vice captain in 2012 under Henry Terrance when Havelocks won the Dialog Rugby League. Muthuthanthri took over the captaincy of the club in 2013 where the team finished runner-up. In 2014 under his leadership Havelocks ended up third.

He currently plays for Colombo Hockey and Football Club in the Dialog Rugby League. His usual position is Flanker, but can also switch to Number 8.

In 2018, he became the first Sri Lankan to be selected to play at the Top-level Provincial Rugby tournament in New Zealand representing Auckland.

Muthuthanthri was named to Sri Lanka's 2018 Commonwealth Games team in March 2018.
