= List of Japan national rugby union players =

List of Japan national rugby union players is a list of people who have played for the Japan national rugby union team. The list only includes players who have played in a match recognised by the Japan Rugby Football Union as a test match.

== List ==
No.	Name	Position	Debut match
1	Tomoo Chiba	Lock	v British Col Vancouver, 24 Sep 1930
2	Mitsugu Fujii	Centre	v British Col Vancouver, 24 Sep 1930
3	Takeo Hagiwara-Maekawa	Scrum-half	v British Col Vancouver, 24 Sep 1930
4	Shuzaburo Iwashita	Prop	v British Col Vancouver, 24 Sep 1930
5	Takeo Kitano	Wing	v British Col Vancouver, 24 Sep 1930
6	Kenichi Matsubara	Flyhalf	v British Col Vancouver, 24 Sep 1930
7	Minoru Mishima	Lock	v British Col Vancouver, 24 Sep 1930
8	Hideo Miyaji-Yoshizawa	Flanker	v British Col Vancouver, 24 Sep 1930
9	Giichi Ota	Prop	v British Col Vancouver, 24 Sep 1930
10	Seizo Shimizu	No. 8	v British Col Vancouver, 24 Sep 1930
11	Seiichi Teramura	Fullback	v British Col Vancouver, 24 Sep 1930
12	Zenjiro Toba-Nakajima	Wing	v British Col Vancouver, 24 Sep 1930
13	Shiro Wada	Flanker	v British Col Vancouver, 24 Sep 1930
14	Tadayuki Yagai	Hooker	v British Col Vancouver, 24 Sep 1930
15	Ke Zhi Zhang	Centre	v British Col Vancouver, 24 Sep 1930
16	Hidemaru Suzuki	(Wing)	v British Col Vancouver, 24 Sep 1930
17	Takao Adachi	No. 8	v Canada Osaka, 31 Jan 1932
18	Takeo Baba	Wing	v Canada Osaka, 31 Jan 1932
19	Saburo Hirao	Centre	v Canada Osaka, 31 Jan 1932
20	Hiroshi Ijyuin	Prop	v Canada Osaka, 31 Jan 1932
21	Tsunehiko Kasahara	Fullback	v Canada Osaka, 31 Jan 1932
22	Taro Kinoshita	Scrum-half	v Canada Osaka, 31 Jan 1932
23	Takeshi Matsubara	Hooker	v Canada Osaka, 31 Jan 1932
24	Saburou Nishigaki	Prop	v Canada Osaka, 31 Jan 1932
25	Masahiko Niwa	Flyhalf	v Canada Osaka, 31 Jan 1932
26	Yoshio Okada	Flanker	v Canada Osaka, 31 Jan 1932
27	Shinji Ono	Lock	v Canada Osaka, 31 Jan 1932
28	Teiji Toshi	Flanker	v Canada Osaka, 31 Jan 1932
29	Ichiro Nogami	Flyhalf	v Canada Tokyo, 11 Feb 1932
30	Ryuichi Iimori	Scrum-half	v Aust Unis Tokyo, 11 Feb 1934
31	Shinshiro Komehana	Flanker	v Aust Unis Tokyo, 11 Feb 1934
32	Kihei Mano	Lock	v Aust Unis Tokyo, 11 Feb 1934
33	Kyuji Matsuda	Hooker	v Aust Unis Tokyo, 11 Feb 1934
34	Taro Sasakura-Yamamoto	Prop	v Aust Unis Tokyo, 11 Feb 1934
35	Sheizo Taji	Flanker	v Aust Unis Tokyo, 11 Feb 1934
36	Tsutomu Tsujita	Centre	v Aust Unis Tokyo, 11 Feb 1934
37	Takashi Naito	Wing	v Aust Unis Osaka, 18 Feb 1934
38	Hiroshi Tachibana	Centre	v Aust Unis Osaka, 18 Feb 1934
39	Hiroshi Tagawa	Lock	v Aust Unis Osaka, 18 Feb 1934
40	Hideo Ito	Lock	v NZ Unis Tokyo, 9 Feb 1936
41	Toichiro Kawagoe	Centre	v NZ Unis Tokyo, 9 Feb 1936
42	Ryohei Kinoshita	Scrum-half	v NZ Unis Tokyo, 9 Feb 1936
43	Hiroyuki Nabeka	Flanker	v NZ Unis Tokyo, 9 Feb 1936
44	Kazutsugu Nishiumi	Prop	v NZ Unis Tokyo, 9 Feb 1936
45	Shoji Sakaguchi	Wing	v NZ Unis Tokyo, 9 Feb 1936
46	Michihiro Sakai	Hooker	v NZ Unis Tokyo, 9 Feb 1936
47	Isao Suzuki	Fullback	v NZ Unis Tokyo, 9 Feb 1936
48	Kazuo Yamaguchi	Lock	v NZ Unis Tokyo, 9 Feb 1936
49	Haruki Yamamoto	No. 8	v NZ Unis Tokyo, 9 Feb 1936
50	Zenji Nishi	Wing	v NZ Unis Osaka, 16 Feb 1936
51	Iwao Ota	Prop	v NZ Unis Osaka, 16 Feb 1936
52	Masao Wada	Scrum-half	v NZ Unis Osaka, 16 Feb 1936
53	Yoshiaki Aoki	Wing	v Oxford Uni Osaka, 1 Oct 1952
54	Atsushi Fujii	Flanker	v Oxford Uni Osaka, 1 Oct 1952
55	Shinichi Hashimoto	Lock	v Oxford Uni Osaka, 1 Oct 1952
56	Noboru Hirohata	No. 8	v Oxford Uni Osaka, 1 Oct 1952
57	Ryotarou Kadoto	Scrum-half	v Oxford Uni Osaka, 1 Oct 1952
58	Syoichiro Koyama	Centre	v Oxford Uni Osaka, 1 Oct 1952
59	Genpei Kuroiwa	Wing	v Oxford Uni Osaka, 1 Oct 1952
60	Yoshinobu Nakajima	Hooker	v Oxford Uni Osaka, 1 Oct 1952
61	Takao Otsuka	Centre	v Oxford Uni Osaka, 1 Oct 1952
62	Ryo Saito	Prop	v Oxford Uni Osaka, 1 Oct 1952
63	Hidehiko Sato	Fullback	v Oxford Uni Osaka, 1 Oct 1952
64	Tetsuo Sekikawa	Prop	v Oxford Uni Osaka, 1 Oct 1952
65	Fukuo Shibagaki	Flyhalf	v Oxford Uni Osaka, 1 Oct 1952
66	Yusaku Takahashi	Flanker	v Oxford Uni Osaka, 1 Oct 1952
67	Akira Tanaka	Lock	v Oxford Uni Osaka, 1 Oct 1952
68	Ryuichi Imamura	Centre	v Oxford Uni Tokyo, 5 Oct 1952
69	Haruo Matsuoka	Flyhalf	v Oxford Uni Tokyo, 5 Oct 1952
70	Sueharu Natsui	Prop	v Oxford Uni Tokyo, 5 Oct 1952
71	Takeshi Takeda	Lock	v Oxford Uni Tokyo, 5 Oct 1952
72	Hideaki Tsuchiya	Scrum-half	v Oxford Uni Tokyo, 5 Oct 1952
73	Toshiaki Tsuchiya	Flanker	v Oxford Uni Tokyo, 5 Oct 1952
74	Akihiko Watanabe	Centre	v Oxford Uni Tokyo, 5 Oct 1952
75	Sada Yamato	No. 8	v Oxford Uni Tokyo, 5 Oct 1952
76	Hideo Harada	No. 8	v Camb Uni Osaka, 27 Sep 1953
77	Keizo Kamisaka	Flyhalf	v Camb Uni Osaka, 27 Sep 1953
78	Teruo Kitajima	Lock	v Camb Uni Osaka, 27 Sep 1953
79	Masaya Matsuoka	Hooker	v Camb Uni Osaka, 27 Sep 1953
80	Mitsuya Ohotsuka	Scrum-half	v Camb Uni Osaka, 27 Sep 1953
81	Toshiro Sasaki	Wing	v Camb Uni Osaka, 27 Sep 1953
82	Yoshiharu Umei	Lock	v Camb Uni Osaka, 27 Sep 1953
83	Junzo Aso	Flyhalf	v Camb Uni Tokyo, 4 Oct 1953
84	Masaaki Matsushige	Flanker	v Camb Uni Tokyo, 4 Oct 1953
85	Manabu Mitoma	Scrum-half	v Camb Uni Tokyo, 4 Oct 1953
86	Hirotoshi Hori	Flyhalf	v Aust Unis Fukuoka, 4 Mar 1956
87	Koji Kikkawa	Hooker	v Aust Unis Fukuoka, 4 Mar 1956
88	Isao Kondo	Wing	v Aust Unis Fukuoka, 4 Mar 1956
89	Katsuhiro Mano	Lock	v Aust Unis Fukuoka, 4 Mar 1956
90	Kunio Miyai	Wing	v Aust Unis Fukuoka, 4 Mar 1956
91	Kazumitsu Ninoguchi	Prop	v Aust Unis Fukuoka, 4 Mar 1956
92	Takashi Shibata	Lock	v Aust Unis Fukuoka, 4 Mar 1956
93	Hiroshi Teranishi	Centre	v Aust Unis Fukuoka, 4 Mar 1956
94	Haruhiko Yamazaki	Flanker	v Aust Unis Fukuoka, 4 Mar 1956
95	Taisei-Shigehir Arai	Flyhalf	v Aust Unis Tokyo, 21 Mar 1956
96	Kazuo Natsui	Prop	v Aust Unis Tokyo, 21 Mar 1956
97	Takashi Sudo	Flanker	v Aust Unis Tokyo, 21 Mar 1956
98	Koichi Takaoka	Centre	v Aust Unis Tokyo, 21 Mar 1956
99	Ryuichi Ohara	Lock	v Aust Unis Osaka, 25 Mar 1956
100	Syozaburo Yamamoto	Scrum-half	v Aust Unis Osaka, 25 Mar 1956
101	Tatsuya Aoi	Centre	v Junior ABs Fukuoka, 2 Mar 1958
102	Rikio Enomoto	Wing	v Junior ABs Fukuoka, 2 Mar 1958
103	Terukazu Fuji	Prop	v Junior ABs Fukuoka, 2 Mar 1958
104	Koichi Imamura	Scrum-half	v Junior ABs Fukuoka, 2 Mar 1958
105	Yoshiaki Kaimoto	Prop	v Junior ABs Fukuoka, 2 Mar 1958
106	Yutaka Katakura	Lock	v Junior ABs Fukuoka, 2 Mar 1958
107	Hiroshi Hibino	Wing	v Junior ABs Osaka, 9 Mar 1958
108	Kiyoshi Kobayashi	Prop	v Junior ABs Osaka, 9 Mar 1958
109	Fumio Saito-Horikawa	Scrum-half	v Junior ABs Osaka, 9 Mar 1958
110	Ryuzo Taniguchi	Centre	v Junior ABs Osaka, 9 Mar 1958
111	Masao Ozaki	No. 8	v Junior ABs Tokyo, 23 Mar 1958
112	Susumu Kitaoka	Fullback	v British Col Osaka, 15 Mar 1959
113	Kinichi Miyajima	Flanker	v British Col Osaka, 15 Mar 1959
114	Kenji Ohotsuka	Flanker	v British Col Osaka, 15 Mar 1959
115	Eiichi Shiga	Hooker	v British Col Osaka, 15 Mar 1959
116	Seiji Tanaka	Lock	v British Col Osaka, 15 Mar 1959
117	Hideki Tominaga	No. 8	v British Col Osaka, 15 Mar 1959
118	Terumi Harada	Fullback	v British Col Tokyo, 22 Mar 1959
119	Kiichirou Akatsu	Hooker	v Ox & Camb Osaka, 27 Sep 1959
120	Masato Hirashima	Flyhalf	v Ox & Camb Osaka, 27 Sep 1959
121	Kenji Ishii	Centre	v Ox & Camb Osaka, 27 Sep 1959
122	Yozo Matsuoka	Fullback	v Ox & Camb Osaka, 27 Sep 1959
123	Kazuhisa Tsutsumi-Tatsuno	No. 8	v Ox & Camb Osaka, 27 Sep 1959
124	Teruyasu Yuki	Prop	v Ox & Camb Osaka, 27 Sep 1959
125	Keisuke Yamada	Flanker	v Ox & Camb Tokyo, 4 Oct 1959
126	Koji Ishizuka	Flanker	v British Col Vancouver, 13 Apr 1963
127	Tadayuki Ito	Wing	v British Col Vancouver, 13 Apr 1963
128	Kazuo Kawasaki	Prop	v British Col Vancouver, 13 Apr 1963
129	Haruhiko Kitajima	Flyhalf	v British Col Vancouver, 13 Apr 1963
130	Masatake Kusatsu	Lock	v British Col Vancouver, 13 Apr 1963
131	Shugoro Miura	Scrum-half	v British Col Vancouver, 13 Apr 1963
132	Kazuo Murata	Hooker	v British Col Vancouver, 13 Apr 1963
133	Hirohisa Nishizumi	Flanker	v British Col Vancouver, 13 Apr 1963
134	Eiji Okabe	Lock	v British Col Vancouver, 13 Apr 1963
135	Masayoshi Ozaki	Centre	v British Col Vancouver, 13 Apr 1963
136	Shiro Ueki	No. 8	v British Col Vancouver, 13 Apr 1963
137	Koji Yamada	Prop	v British Col Vancouver, 13 Apr 1963
138	Tadamasa Fujimoto-Kamohara	Flyhalf	v NZ Unis Osaka, 12 Mar 1967
139	Megumi Horikoshi	Lock	v NZ Unis Osaka, 12 Mar 1967
140	Motonari Ishida	No. 8	v NZ Unis Osaka, 12 Mar 1967
141	Takashi Jinno	Prop	v NZ Unis Osaka, 12 Mar 1967
142	Katsumi Kamata	Lock	v NZ Unis Osaka, 12 Mar 1967
143	Tsutomu Katsuraguchi	Fullback	v NZ Unis Osaka, 12 Mar 1967
144	Morio Kawasaki	Prop	v NZ Unis Osaka, 12 Mar 1967
145	Yoshinori Okubo	Scrum-half	v NZ Unis Osaka, 12 Mar 1967
146	Yoshihiro Sakata	Wing	v NZ Unis Osaka, 12 Mar 1967
147	Toru Tenmyo	Hooker	v NZ Unis Osaka, 12 Mar 1967
148	Yoshiharu Yamaguchi	Flanker	v NZ Unis Osaka, 12 Mar 1967
149	Akira Yokoi	Centre	v NZ Unis Osaka, 12 Mar 1967
150	Katsutoshi Azuma	Scrum-half	v NZ Unis Tokyo, 21 Mar 1967
151	Shozo Fujita	No. 8	v NZ Unis Tokyo, 21 Mar 1967
152	Nobuo Ikaida	Fullback	v NZ Unis Tokyo, 21 Mar 1967
153	Kazumasa Inubuse	Centre	v NZ Unis Tokyo, 21 Mar 1967
154	Takeshi Katō	Flanker	v NZ Unis Tokyo, 21 Mar 1967
155	Haruhiko Komiya	Prop	v NZ Unis Tokyo, 21 Mar 1967
156	Shigeru Murayama	Hooker	v NZ Unis Tokyo, 21 Mar 1967
157	Hisashi Yamaoka	Wing	v NZ Unis Tokyo, 21 Mar 1967
158	Mitsuo Atokawa	Hooker	v Junior ABs Wellington, 3 Jun 1968
159	Yoshiaki Izawa	Flanker	v Junior ABs Wellington, 3 Jun 1968
160	Masaharu Mantani	Fullback	v Junior ABs Wellington, 3 Jun 1968
161	Hiroshi Ogasawara	Lock	v Junior ABs Wellington, 3 Jun 1968
162	Takeo Saruta	Prop	v Junior ABs Wellington, 3 Jun 1968
163	Ryozo Imazato	Scrum-half	v Hong Kong Tokyo, 9 Mar 1969
164	Masayoshi Ito	Lock	v Hong Kong Tokyo, 9 Mar 1969
165	Katsumi Miyaji	Prop	v Hong Kong Tokyo, 9 Mar 1969
166	Yoshio Tanigawa	Flanker	v Hong Kong Tokyo, 9 Mar 1969
167	Toshio Terai	Lock	v Hong Kong Tokyo, 9 Mar 1969
168	Masahiro Uchida	Flanker	v Hong Kong Tokyo, 9 Mar 1969
169	Satoru Matsuoka	No. 8	v Thailand Bangkok, 18 Jan 1970
170	Makoto Mizutani	Centre	v Thailand Bangkok, 18 Jan 1970
171	Bunji Shimazaki	Centre	v Thailand Bangkok, 18 Jan 1970
172	Masaaki Shimozono	Prop	v Thailand Bangkok, 18 Jan 1970
173	Tadahiko Omata	Hooker	v NZ Unis Tokyo, 8 Mar 1970
174	Kishio Ishiyama	Centre	v NZ Unis Osaka, 15 Mar 1970
175	Susumu Hara	(Prop)	v NZ Unis Osaka, 15 Mar 1970
176	Toshio Kurosaka	(Prop)	v NZ Unis Osaka, 15 Mar 1970
177	Koji Miyata	Centre	v England XV Osaka, 24 Sep 1971
178	Yoshihiro Murata	No. 8	v England XV Osaka, 24 Sep 1971
179	Sachio Iburi	Prop	v Hong Kong Hong Kong, 11 Nov 1972
180	Koichi Shibata	Lock	v Hong Kong Hong Kong, 11 Nov 1972
181	Hideo Akama	Flanker	v Wales XV Cardiff, 6 Oct 1973
182	Masaru Fujiwara	Centre	v Wales XV Cardiff, 6 Oct 1973
183	Kazumi Ohigashi	Hooker	v Wales XV Cardiff, 6 Oct 1973
184	Hiroaki Shukuzawa	Scrum-half	v Wales XV Cardiff, 6 Oct 1973
185	Iwao Yamamoto	Fullback	v Wales XV Cardiff, 6 Oct 1973
186	Kazuhito Yoshino	Prop	v Wales XV Cardiff, 6 Oct 1973
187	Nobuyuki Ueyama	Fullback	v England U23 Twickenham, 13 Oct 1973
188	Masakatsu Iguchi	Flyhalf	v France Bordeaux, 27 Oct 1973
189	Junji Yoshida	Flanker	v France Bordeaux, 27 Oct 1973
190	Ken Aruga	Wing	v NZ Unis Dunedin, 12 May 1974
191	Takeo Ishizuka	Flanker	v NZ Unis Dunedin, 12 May 1974
192	Tsukasa Takada	Prop	v NZ Unis Dunedin, 12 May 1974
193	Shigetaka Mori	Centre	v Junior ABs Auckland, 19 May 1974
194	Masao Yoshida	Centre	v Junior ABs Auckland, 19 May 1974
195	Hitoshi Kano	Centre	v Sri Lanka Colombo, 23 Nov 1974
196	Osamu Koyabu	Flyhalf	v Sri Lanka Colombo, 23 Nov 1974
197	Susumu Kurihara	Wing	v Sri Lanka Colombo, 23 Nov 1974
198	Yuji Matsuo	Scrum-half	v Sri Lanka Colombo, 23 Nov 1974
199	Nobufumi Tanaka	Wing	v Sri Lanka Colombo, 23 Nov 1974
200	Shigeru Toyoda	Lock	v Sri Lanka Colombo, 23 Nov 1974
201	Osamu Yamashita	Flanker	v Sri Lanka Colombo, 23 Nov 1974
202	Akio Hiraki	Wing	v Camb Uni Tokyo, 30 Mar 1975
203	Ichiro Kobayashi	No. 8	v Australia Sydney, 2 Aug 1975
204	Toru Wada	Hooker	v Australia Brisbane, 17 Aug 1975
205	Shigekazu Hoshino	Flyhalf	v Wales XV Tokyo, 24 Sep 1975
206	Masayuki Miyauchi	Prop	v Wales XV Tokyo, 24 Sep 1975
207	Akio Ueda	(Scrum-half)	v Wales XV Tokyo, 24 Sep 1975
208	Ryutaro Fukurodate	Lock	v NZ Unis Tokyo, 28 Mar 1976
209	Atsuhiko Kanasashi	Wing	v NZ Unis Tokyo, 28 Mar 1976
210	Takeshi Nakayama	Prop	v NZ Unis Tokyo, 28 Mar 1976
211	Hirotsugu Ato	Flanker	v British Col Vancouver, 12 May 1976
212	Manabu Sasada	Hooker	v British Col Vancouver, 12 May 1976
213	Kyoichi Toyoyama	Flanker	v British Col Vancouver, 12 May 1976
214	Takeo Tsuyama	Scrum-half	v British Col Vancouver, 12 May 1976
215	Hirotaka Ujino	Wing	v British Col Vancouver, 12 May 1976
216	Yoichiro Minamikawa	(Centre)	v British Col Vancouver, 12 May 1976
217	Toshiaki Yasui	Prop	v Scotland XV Murrayfield, 25 Sep 1976
218	Kazuo Muraguchi	(Wing)	v Scotland XV Murrayfield, 25 Sep 1976
219	Naoshi Kumagai	Lock	v Welsh Clubs Swansea, 9 Oct 1976
220	Takeshi Hatakeyama	Lock	v Italy Padova, 21 Oct 1976
221	Isao Saito	Flanker	v Oxford Uni Tokyo, 27 Mar 1977
222	Kiyoshi Segawa	Lock	v Oxford Uni Tokyo, 27 Mar 1977
223	Akemi Namura	(Scrum-half)	v Oxford Uni Tokyo, 27 Mar 1977
224	Junya Matsumoto	Scrum-half	v Scotland XV Tokyo, 18 Sep 1977
225	Mitsuru Hohokabe	Hooker	v France XV Tokyo, 23 Sep 1978
226	Mitsuru Sakamoto	Flanker	v France XV Tokyo, 23 Sep 1978
227	Toshihiko Kitahara	Lock	v Korea Kuala Lumpur, 25 Nov 1978
228	Takeaki Toyoda	Prop	v Korea Kuala Lumpur, 25 Nov 1978
229	Tetsuro Yajima	Fullback	v Korea Kuala Lumpur, 25 Nov 1978
230	Koji Horaguchi	Prop	v England XV Osaka, 13 May 1979
231	Naohisa Tanifuji	Fullback	v England XV Osaka, 13 May 1979
232	Takashi Kudo-Nakayama	(Wing)	v England XV Osaka, 13 May 1979
233	Hideo Toshima	Centre	v Camb Uni Tokyo, 24 Sep 1979
234	Kenzou Segawa	(Lock)	v Camb Uni Tokyo, 24 Sep 1979
235	Kazuo Sejimo	(No. 8)	v Camb Uni Tokyo, 24 Sep 1979
236	Michihito Chida	Lock	v NZ Unis Tokyo, 30 Mar 1980
237	Jiro Ishiyama	Prop	v NZ Unis Tokyo, 30 Mar 1980
238	Hiroaki Takahashi	Flanker	v NZ Unis Tokyo, 30 Mar 1980
239	Tsuyoshi Fujita	Hooker	v Netherlands Hilversum, 4 Oct 1980
240	Takashi Ito	Flanker	v Netherlands Hilversum, 4 Oct 1980
241	Hikaru Kawachi	Lock	v Netherlands Hilversum, 4 Oct 1980
242	Shinichi Oikawa	Flyhalf	v Netherlands Hilversum, 4 Oct 1980
243	Toshiyuki Hayashi	Lock	v France XV Toulouse, 19 Oct 1980
244	Fukumi Kanaya	Centre	v France XV Toulouse, 19 Oct 1980
245	Yoshimitsu Konishi	Scrum-half	v France XV Toulouse, 19 Oct 1980
246	Esturo Tsuji	(Wing)	v France XV Toulouse, 19 Oct 1980
247	Toshihiro Hirai	Hooker	v Korea Taipei, 16 Nov 1980
248	Yoshichiro Ikeda	Prop	v Korea Taipei, 16 Nov 1980
249	Nortitoshi Toyoda	(Lock)	v Hong Kong Tokyo, 30 Jan 1982
250	Kazuhiko Honjo	Wing	v Canada Osaka, 11 Apr 1982
251	Masahiro Inoue	Hooker	v Canada Osaka, 11 Apr 1982
252	Takanobu Kondo	(Lock)	v NZ Unis Wellington, 16 May 1982
253	Seiji Hirao	Centre	v NZ Unis Pukekohe, 30 May 1982
254	Yasuharu Kawase	Lock	v NZ Unis Pukekohe, 30 May 1982
255	Kimitaka Morioka	Flyhalf	v Korea Singapore, 27 Nov 1982
256	Noboru Watanabe	(Wing)	v Korea Singapore, 27 Nov 1982
257	Koji Kawachi	Lock	v Ox & Camb Tokyo, 25 Sep 1983
258	Hideo Kobayashi	Centre	v Ox & Camb Tokyo, 25 Sep 1983
259	Atsushi Oyagi	Lock	v Ox & Camb Tokyo, 25 Sep 1983
260	Kenzo Takada	Flanker	v Ox & Camb Tokyo, 25 Sep 1983
261	Tetsuya Higashida	Wing	v Wales XV Cardiff, 22 Oct 1983
262	Toshitaka Kimura	Prop	v France XV Osaka, 30 Sep 1984
263	Masahiko Koshiyama	Flanker	v France XV Osaka, 30 Sep 1984
264	Shinji Onuki	Wing	v France XV Osaka, 30 Sep 1984
265	Masato Yasuda	Fullback	v France XV Tokyo, 7 Oct 1984
266	Masaharu Aizawa	Prop	v Korea Fukuoka, 27 Oct 1984
267	Toshiro Yoshino	Wing	v USA Tokyo, 21 Apr 1985
268	Shogo Mukai	Fullback	v Ireland XV Osaka, 26 May 1985
269	Daijiro Murai	Wing	v Ireland XV Osaka, 26 May 1985
270	Yoshifumi Kasai	Flanker	v France XV Dax, 19 Oct 1985
271	Eiji Kutsuki	Flyhalf	v France XV Dax, 19 Oct 1985
272	Toshihiro Matsunaga	Centre	v France XV Dax, 19 Oct 1985
273	Nofomuli Taumoefolau	Centre	v France XV Dax, 19 Oct 1985
274	Masato Tsuchida	No. 8	v France XV Nantes, 26 Oct 1985
275	Kinya Konishi	Flanker	v USA Torrance, 31 May 1986
276	Katsuhiro Matsuo	Flyhalf	v USA Torrance, 31 May 1986
277	Osamu Ota	Prop	v USA Torrance, 31 May 1986
278	Hopoi Taione	Flanker	v USA Torrance, 31 May 1986
279	Koji Yasumi	Prop	v Canada Burnaby Lake, 7 Jun 1986
280	Katsunori Ishii	Fullback	v Scotland XV Murrayfield, 27 Sep 1986
281	Seiji Kurihara	Lock	v Scotland XV Murrayfield, 27 Sep 1986
282	Yoshihiko Sakuraba	Lock	v Scotland XV Murrayfield, 27 Sep 1986
283	Katsufumi Miyamoto	(Flanker)	v Scotland XV Murrayfield, 27 Sep 1986
284	Yuji Masutome	Hooker	v Korea Bangkok, 29 Nov 1986
285	Kojiro Yoshinaga	Centre	v Korea Bangkok, 29 Nov 1986
286	Hisataka Ikuta	Scrum-half	v USA Brisbane, 24 May 1987
287	Sinali Latu	Flanker	v USA Brisbane, 24 May 1987
288	Mitsutake Hagimoto	Scrum-half	v England Sydney, 30 May 1987
289	Minoru Okidoi	Wing	v Australia Sydney, 3 Jun 1987
290	Tsutomu Hirose	Hooker	v Ireland Stud Tokyo, 3 Oct 1987
291	Katsumi Sogumo	Flanker	v Ireland Stud Tokyo, 3 Oct 1987
292	Masami Horikoshi	Scrum-half	v Oxford Uni Tokyo, 1 Oct 1988
293	Kenji Imakoma	Centre	v Oxford Uni Tokyo, 1 Oct 1988
294	Takanori Nagata	Prop	v Oxford Uni Tokyo, 1 Oct 1988
295	Koda Tsunejiro	Flanker	v Oxford Uni Tokyo, 1 Oct 1988
296	Seigo Umeki-Kunisada	Wing	v Oxford Uni Tokyo, 1 Oct 1988
297	Yoshihito Yoshida	Wing	v Oxford Uni Tokyo, 1 Oct 1988
298	Masayuki Nagai	(Prop)	v Oxford Uni Tokyo, 1 Oct 1988
299	Toshitsugu Yamamoto	Fullback	v Korea Hong Kong, 19 Nov 1988
300	Kiyoshi Imazumi	(Wing)	v Korea Hong Kong, 19 Nov 1988
301	Shinobu Aoki	Flyhalf	v Scotland XV Tokyo, 28 May 1989
302	Hiroyuki Kajihara	Flanker	v Scotland XV Tokyo, 28 May 1989
303	Shuji Nakashima	Flanker	v Scotland XV Tokyo, 28 May 1989
304	Masanori Takura	Prop	v Scotland XV Tokyo, 28 May 1989
305	Ekeroma Luaiufi	Lock	v Fiji Tokyo, 4 Mar 1990
306	Tadashi Goda	(Wing)	v Fiji Tokyo, 4 Mar 1990
307	Kazuaki Takahashi	(Prop)	v Fiji Tokyo, 4 Mar 1990
308	Takahiro Hosokawa	Fullback	v Tonga Tokyo, 8 Apr 1990
309	Narihiro Watanabe	Scrum-half	v Samoa Tokyo, 15 Apr 1990
310	Masahiro Kunda	(Hooker)	v Samoa Tokyo, 15 Apr 1990
311	Kiyomi Fukumoro	Fullback	v Korea Colombo, 27 Oct 1990
312	Susumu Fukuoka	Centre	v Korea Colombo, 27 Oct 1990
313	Hirofumi Ouchi	Flanker	v Korea Colombo, 27 Oct 1990
314	Wataru Murata	Scrum-half	v USA Blaine, 27 Apr 1991
315	Yukio Motoki	(Centre)	v USA Blaine, 27 Apr 1991
316	Tatsuya Maeda	Fullback	v USA Chicago, 4 May 1991
317	Terunori Masuho	Wing	v USA Chicago, 4 May 1991
318	Sam Kaleta	Flanker	v Hong Kong Seoul, 26 Sep 1992
319	Jun Komura	Flanker	v Hong Kong Seoul, 26 Sep 1992
320	Sione Latu	No. 8	v Hong Kong Seoul, 26 Sep 1992
321	Tsutomu Matsuda	Fullback	v Hong Kong Seoul, 26 Sep 1992
322	Lopeti Oto	Wing	v Hong Kong Seoul, 26 Sep 1992
323	Noriyuki Owashi	Flyhalf	v Hong Kong Seoul, 26 Sep 1992
324	Hirohisa Kato	Centre	v Argentina Tucuman, 15 May 1993
325	Hideo Kaneshiro	Flanker	v Argentina Buenos Aires, 22 May 1993
326	Bruce Ferguson	Lock	v Wales Cardiff, 16 Oct 1993
327	Mitsuo Fujikake	Centre	v Wales Cardiff, 16 Oct 1993
328	Yoji Nagatomo	Scrum-half	v Wales Cardiff, 16 Oct 1993
329	Ian Williams	Wing	v Wales Cardiff, 16 Oct 1993
330	Takashi Akatsuka	Lock	v Fiji Ehime, 8 May 1994
331	Hideki Nishida	Scrum-half	v Fiji Ehime, 8 May 1994
332	Yasunobu Sato	Prop	v Fiji Tokyo, 15 May 1994
333	Keiji Hirose	Flyhalf	v Korea Kuala Lumpur, 29 Oct 1994
334	Tetsuya Takeyama	Centre	v Korea Kuala Lumpur, 29 Oct 1994
335	Tomoya Haneda	Flanker	v Tonga Nagoya, 11 Feb 1995
336	Eiji Hirotsu	Hooker	v Tonga Nagoya, 11 Feb 1995
337	Ko Izawa	Flanker	v Tonga Nagoya, 11 Feb 1995
338	Akira Yoshida	Centre	v Romania Tokyo, 3 May 1995
339	David Bickle	Lock	v Hong Kong Tokyo, 11 May 1996
340	Takeomi Ito	No. 8	v Hong Kong Tokyo, 11 May 1996
341	Andrew McCormick	Centre	v Hong Kong Tokyo, 11 May 1996
342	Toshikazu Nakamichi	Prop	v Hong Kong Tokyo, 11 May 1996
343	Hiroki Ozeki	Wing	v Hong Kong Tokyo, 11 May 1996
344	Yasunori Watanabe	(Lock)	v Hong Kong Tokyo, 11 May 1996
345	Kenichi Kimura	Prop	v Canada Tokyo, 9 Jun 1996
346	Kenji Sato	Lock	v Canada Tokyo, 9 Jun 1996
347	Kazu Hamabe	(Prop)	v Canada Tokyo, 9 Jun 1996
348	Masaaki Sakata	(Hooker)	v Canada Tokyo, 9 Jun 1996
349	Osami Yatsuhashi	Fullback	v USA San Francisco, 6 Jul 1996
350	Daisuke Ohata	Wing	v Korea Taipei, 9 Nov 1996
351	Shuji Shimizu	Prop	v Korea Taipei, 9 Nov 1996
352	Hiroyuki Tanuma	Lock	v Korea Taipei, 9 Nov 1996
353	Isikeli Basiyalo	Lock	v Hong Kong Hong Kong, 3 May 1997
354	Rob Gordon	No. 8	v Hong Kong Hong Kong, 3 May 1997
355	Kensuke Iwabuchi	Flyhalf	v Hong Kong Hong Kong, 3 May 1997
356	Keiji Mizobe	Prop	v Hong Kong Hong Kong, 3 May 1997
357	Patiliai Tuidraki	Wing	v Hong Kong Hong Kong, 3 May 1997
358	Kenichi Wada	Fullback	v Hong Kong Hong Kong, 3 May 1997
359	Jun Oyamada	(Wing)	v Hong Kong Hong Kong, 3 May 1997
360	Kohei Oguchi	Prop	v USA San Francisco, 7 Jun 1997
361	Kazuya Koizumi	(Lock)	v USA San Francisco, 7 Jun 1997
362	Shin Hasegawa	(Flanker)	v Hong Kong Tokyo, 29 Jun 1997
363	Steve Miln	Fullback	v Canada Tokyo, 3 May 1998
364	Naoto Nakamura	Prop	v Canada Tokyo, 3 May 1998
365	Greg Smith	Flanker	v Canada Tokyo, 3 May 1998
366	Ross Thompson	No. 8	v Canada Tokyo, 3 May 1998
367	Keisuke Sawaki	(Flyhalf)	v Argentina Tokyo, 15 Sep 1998
368	Katsuji Ohara	(Scrum-half)	v Korea Singapore, 24 Oct 1998
369	Masahiro Kurokawa	(No. 8)	v C Taipai Singapore, 27 Oct 1998
370	Takafumi Hirao	Wing	v Korea Bangkok, 18 Dec 1998
371	Masamitsu Oyabu	Centre	v Korea Bangkok, 18 Dec 1998
372	Takayuki Sugata	(Flanker)	v Korea Bangkok, 18 Dec 1998
373	Graeme Bachop	Scrum-half	v Canada Tokyo, 1 May 1999
374	Jamie Joseph	Flanker	v Canada Tokyo, 1 May 1999
375	Kenji Kasai	Prop	v Canada Tokyo, 1 May 1999
376	Goshi Tachikawa	(Fullback)	v Canada Tokyo, 1 May 1999
377	Naoya Okubo	Lock	v Tonga Tokyo, 8 May 1999
378	Junji Hiratsuka	(Lock)	v USA Honolulu, 12 Jun 1999
379	Ryuji Ishi	No. 8	v Spain Tokyo, 20 Aug 1999
380	Ryohei Miki	(Wing)	v Spain Tokyo, 20 Aug 1999
381	Koji Fukuoka	Fullback	v Fiji Tokyo, 20 May 2000
382	Hideki Nanba	Centre	v Fiji Tokyo, 20 May 2000
383	Naoya Okubo	Lock	v Fiji Tokyo, 20 May 2000
384	Yuji Sonoda	Scrum-half	v Fiji Tokyo, 20 May 2000
385	Hiroshi Sugawara	Flanker	v Fiji Tokyo, 20 May 2000
386	Karl Todd	Lock	v Fiji Tokyo, 20 May 2000
387	Masahiko Toyoyama	Prop	v Fiji Tokyo, 20 May 2000
388	Toru Kurihara	(Wing)	v Fiji Tokyo, 20 May 2000
389	Shotaro Onishi	(Centre)	v Fiji Tokyo, 20 May 2000
390	Takahiro Hirata	(Prop)	v USA Osaka, 27 May 2000
391	Yasuhiko Iwama	(Prop)	v USA Osaka, 27 May 2000
392	Takuo Kawasaki	(Back row)	v USA Osaka, 27 May 2000
393	Michinori Oda	(Fullback)	v USA Osaka, 27 May 2000
394	Mamoru Ito	Scrum-half	v Tonga Tokyo, 3 Jun 2000
395	Takeshi Nozawa	(Flanker)	v Tonga Tokyo, 3 Jun 2000
396	Masanori Tatsukawa	Hooker	v Samoa Apia, 10 Jun 2000
397	Kousuke Fujii	(Lock)	v Samoa Apia, 10 Jun 2000
398	Yasuharu Uryu	(Centre)	v Samoa Apia, 10 Jun 2000
399	Masao Amino	Hooker	v Korea Aomori, 2 Jul 2000
400	Masanao Washiya	Lock	v Korea Aomori, 2 Jul 2000
401	Noboru Yasuda	(Hooker)	v Korea Aomori, 2 Jul 2000
402	Toshikazu Fumihara	Prop	v Ireland Lansdowne Road, 11 Nov 2000
403	Reo Kawai	Centre	v Ireland Lansdowne Road, 11 Nov 2000
404	Koichi Kubo	Flanker	v Ireland Lansdowne Road, 11 Nov 2000
405	Soushi Fuchigami	(Flyhalf)	v Ireland Lansdowne Road, 11 Nov 2000
406	Nataniela Oto	Centre	v Korea Tokyo, 13 May 2001
407	Kenichi Takayanagi	Prop	v Korea Tokyo, 13 May 2001
408	Yutaka Tsujimoto	Hooker	v Korea Tokyo, 13 May 2001
409	Shinichi Tsukita	Scrum-half	v Korea Tokyo, 13 May 2001
410	Luatangi Vatuvei	Lock	v Korea Tokyo, 13 May 2001
411	Eiji Yamamoto	Flanker	v Korea Tokyo, 13 May 2001
412	Akihito Kato	(Hooker)	v Korea Tokyo, 13 May 2001
413	Hajime Kiso	(Back row)	v Korea Tokyo, 13 May 2001
414	Kazunaka Motoyoshi	Prop	v C Taipai Tainan, 27 May 2001
415	Yuya Saito	No. 8	v C Taipai Tainan, 27 May 2001
416	Hirotoki Onozawa	Fullback	v Wales Tokyo, 17 Jun 2001
417	Jun Akune	(Lock)	v Wales Tokyo, 17 Jun 2001
418	Ryō Yamamura	(Prop)	v Wales Tokyo, 17 Jun 2001
419	Hideyuki Yoshida	Centre	v Samoa Tokyo, 4 Jul 2001
420	Yuichi Hisadomi	Prop	v Russia Tokyo, 19 May 2002
421	Andy Miller	Flyhalf	v Russia Tokyo, 19 May 2002
422	Takuro Miuchi	Flanker	v Russia Tokyo, 19 May 2002
423	Adam Parker	(Lock)	v Russia Tokyo, 19 May 2002
424	Masahito Yamamoto	(Prop)	v Russia Tokyo, 19 May 2002
425	Dean Anglesey	Flanker	v Tonga Kumagaya, 26 May 2002
426	Tsuyoshi Kinoshita	Prop	v Tonga Kumagaya, 26 May 2002
427	Takashi Yoshida	Fullback	v Tonga Kumagaya, 26 May 2002
428	Masahiro Shichinohe	Hooker	v C Taipai Tainan, 21 Jul 2002
429	Takamasa Sawaguchi	Lock	v Korea Ulsan, 13 Oct 2002
430	Tetsuya Watanabe	Centre	v Korea Ulsan, 13 Oct 2002
431	Dai Katsuno	(Centre)	v Korea Ulsan, 13 Oct 2002
432	Kenji Shomen	(Flyhalf)	v Korea Ulsan, 13 Oct 2002
433	Ken Tsukagoshi	(Hooker)	v Korea Ulsan, 13 Oct 2002
434	George Konia	Centre	v USA San Francisco, 17 May 2003
435	Yohei Shinomiya	Wing	v USA San Francisco, 17 May 2003
436	Reuben Parkinson	Centre	v Russia Tokyo, 25 May 2003
437	Ryota Asano	Flanker	v Australia A Osaka, 5 Jun 2003
438	Hiroki Matsuo	(Hooker)	v Australia A Osaka, 5 Jun 2003
439	Takashi Tsuji	Scrum-half	v Scotland Townsville, 12 Oct 2003
440	Hiroaki Ito	Flyhalf	v Korea Tokyo, 16 May 2004
441	Takanori Kumagae	Lock	v Korea Tokyo, 16 May 2004
442	Yuji Matsubara	Hooker	v Korea Tokyo, 16 May 2004
443	Masatoshi Mukoyama	Centre	v Korea Tokyo, 16 May 2004
444	Koichi Ohigashi	Fullback	v Korea Tokyo, 16 May 2004
445	Wataru Ikeda	(Scrum-half)	v Korea Tokyo, 16 May 2004
446	Hitoshi Ono	(Lock)	v Korea Tokyo, 16 May 2004
447	Mau Touriki	Flanker	v Russia Tokyo, 27 May 2004
448	Kyohei Morita	Flyhalf	v Canada Tokyo, 30 May 2004
449	Mitsugu Yamamoto	(Hooker)	v Canada Tokyo, 30 May 2004
450	Kosuke Endo	Fullback	v Italy Tokyo, 4 Jul 2004
451	Keiji Takei	(Utility back)	v Italy Tokyo, 4 Jul 2004
452	Takashi Yamaoka	(Hooker)	v Italy Tokyo, 4 Jul 2004
453	Hayato Daimon	Wing	v Scotland Perth, 13 Nov 2004
454	Koichiro Kubota	Wing	v Scotland Perth, 13 Nov 2004
455	Seiichi Shimonura	Centre	v Scotland Perth, 13 Nov 2004
456	Kiyonori Tanaka	(Scrum-half)	v Scotland Perth, 13 Nov 2004
457	Takatoyo Yamaguchi	(Back row)	v Scotland Perth, 13 Nov 2004
458	Hiroki Mizuno	Wing	v Romania Bucharest, 20 Nov 2004
459	Tatsukichi Nishiura	(Prop)	v Wales Millennium Stadium, 26 Nov 2004
460	Tatsuhiko Otao	(Wing)	v Wales Millennium Stadium, 26 Nov 2004
461	Christian Loamanu	Wing	v Uruguay Montevideo, 16 Apr 2005
462	Hare Makiri	Flanker	v Uruguay Montevideo, 16 Apr 2005
463	Tomoaki Nakai	Flanker	v Uruguay Montevideo, 16 Apr 2005
464	Hiroshi Takahashi	Prop	v Uruguay Montevideo, 16 Apr 2005
465	Jamie Washington	Lock	v Uruguay Montevideo, 16 Apr 2005
466	Ayumu Goromaru	(Fullback)	v Uruguay Montevideo, 16 Apr 2005
467	Shota Goto	(Scrum-half)	v Uruguay Montevideo, 16 Apr 2005
468	Shigeyasu Takagi	(Prop)	v Uruguay Montevideo, 16 Apr 2005
469	Masakazu Nakabayashi	Hooker	v Hong Kong Tokyo, 8 May 2005
470	Katoni Otukolo	Centre	v Hong Kong Tokyo, 8 May 2005
471	Philip O'Reilly	(Flanker)	v Korea Kangwon, 15 May 2005
472	Teppei Tomioka	(Centre)	v Ireland Osaka, 12 Jun 2005
473	Jumpei Enomoto	Centre	v Spain Tokyo, 5 Nov 2005
474	Takashi Kikutani	Flanker	v Spain Tokyo, 5 Nov 2005
475	Toshizumi Kitagawa	Lock	v Spain Tokyo, 5 Nov 2005
476	Takashi Miyake	(Utility back)	v Spain Tokyo, 5 Nov 2005
477	Tsuyoshi Sato	(Lock)	v Spain Tokyo, 5 Nov 2005
478	Tomokazu Soma	(Prop)	v Spain Tokyo, 5 Nov 2005
479	Eiji Ando	Flyhalf	v Arabian Gulf Tokyo, 16 Apr 2006
480	Yuta Imamura	Centre	v Arabian Gulf Tokyo, 16 Apr 2006
481	Yuki Yatomi	(Scrum-half)	v Korea Tokyo, 23 Apr 2006
482	Atsushi Moriya	Centre	v Tonga Fukuoka, 4 Jun 2006
483	Tomoaki Taniguchi	(Lock)	v Tonga Fukuoka, 4 Jun 2006
484	Go Aruga	Fullback	v Hong Kong Hong Kong, 18 Nov 2006
485	Tomoki Kitagawa	(Wing)	v Hong Kong Hong Kong, 18 Nov 2006
486	James Arlidge	Flyhalf	v Korea Tokyo, 22 Apr 2007
487	Bryce Robins	Centre	v Korea Tokyo, 22 Apr 2007
488	Koji Taira	Centre	v Korea Tokyo, 22 Apr 2007
489	Tomoki Yoshida	Scrum-half	v Korea Tokyo, 22 Apr 2007
490	Yusuke Aoki	(Hooker)	v Korea Tokyo, 22 Apr 2007
491	Yuji Kitagawa	(Lock)	v Korea Tokyo, 22 Apr 2007
492	Kosei Ono	(Centre)	v Korea Tokyo, 22 Apr 2007
493	Toshiaki Hirose	Flyhalf	v Hong Kong Tokyo, 29 Apr 2007
494	Takamichi Sasaki	Flanker	v Hong Kong Tokyo, 29 Apr 2007
495	Luke Thompson	Lock	v Hong Kong Tokyo, 29 Apr 2007
496	Taku Inokuchi	(Hooker)	v Hong Kong Tokyo, 29 Apr 2007
497	Takahiro Sugiura	(Prop)	v Hong Kong Tokyo, 29 Apr 2007
498	Glen Marsh	(Flanker)	v Australia A Townsville, 9 Jun 2007
499	Tatsuya Kusumi	Fullback	v Australia Lyon, 8 Sep 2007
500	Kim Chul-won	(Scrum-half)	v Wales Millennium Stadium, 20 Sep 2007
501	Ryan Nicholas	Centre	v Korea Incheon, 26 Apr 2008
502	Koji Shinozuka	Flanker	v Korea Incheon, 26 Apr 2008
503	Hiroki Yoshida	Wing	v Korea Incheon, 26 Apr 2008
504	Yoshitaka Nakayama	(Flanker)	v Korea Incheon, 26 Apr 2008
505	Akira Ozaki	(Prop)	v Korea Incheon, 26 Apr 2008
506	Takashi Sato	(Scrum-half)	v Korea Incheon, 26 Apr 2008
507	Yosuke Ikegaya	Prop	v Arabian Gulf Osaka, 3 May 2008
508	Yuta Inose	(Prop)	v Arabian Gulf Osaka, 3 May 2008
509	Taira Sato	(Lock)	v Arabian Gulf Osaka, 3 May 2008
510	Fumiaki Tanaka	(Scrum-half)	v Arabian Gulf Osaka, 3 May 2008
511	Shaun Webb	(Flyhalf)	v Arabian Gulf Osaka, 3 May 2008
512	Koliniasi Holani	No. 8	v Kazakhstan Almaty, 10 May 2008
513	Naonori Mizuyama	(Hooker)	v Tonga Miyagi, 15 Jun 2008
514	Kensuke Hatakeyama	Prop	v USA Nagoya, 16 Nov 2008
515	Hisateru Hirashima	Prop	v USA Nagoya, 16 Nov 2008
516	Kaoru Matsushita	Fullback	v USA Nagoya, 16 Nov 2008
517	Koji Tomioka	Wing	v USA Nagoya, 16 Nov 2008
518	Michael Leitch	(Flanker)	v USA Nagoya, 16 Nov 2008
519	Masakazu Irie	(Centre)	v USA Tokyo, 22 Nov 2008
520	Naoki Kawamata	(Prop)	v USA Tokyo, 22 Nov 2008
521	Piei Mafileo	(Wing)	v USA Tokyo, 22 Nov 2008
522	Masato Toyoda	(No. 8)	v USA Tokyo, 22 Nov 2008
523	Toetuʻu Taufa	No. 8	v Kazakhstan Osaka, 25 Apr 2009
524	Hiroshi Yamashita	Prop	v Kazakhstan Osaka, 25 Apr 2009
525	Tateo Kanai	(Hooker)	v Kazakhstan Osaka, 25 Apr 2009
526	Shinsuke Nakamura	(Prop)	v Kazakhstan Osaka, 25 Apr 2009
527	Jack Tarrant	(Centre)	v Kazakhstan Osaka, 25 Apr 2009
528	Yoshimitsu Yasue	(Hooker)	v Hong Kong Hong Kong, 2 May 2009
529	Masakazu Toyota	(No. 8)	v Singapore Singapore, 23 May 2009
530	Shōta Horie	Hooker	v Canada Miyagi, 15 Nov 2009
531	Daniel Quate	(Lock)	v Canada Miyagi, 15 Nov 2009
532	Alisi Tupuailei	(Centre)	v Canada Miyagi, 15 Nov 2009
533	Takeshi Kizu	(Hooker)	v Canada Tokyo, 21 Nov 2009
534	Shinya Makabe	(Lock)	v Canada Tokyo, 21 Nov 2009
535	Yasunori Nagatomo	Wing	v Korea Daegu, 1 May 2010
536	Sione Vatuvei	Flanker	v Korea Daegu, 1 May 2010
537	Nozomu Fujita	(Prop)	v Korea Daegu, 1 May 2010
538	Hiroki Yuhara	(Hooker)	v Korea Daegu, 1 May 2010
539	Ryo Kanazawa	Centre	v Arabian Gulf Tokyo, 8 May 2010
540	Koji Wada	(Scrum-half)	v Arabian Gulf Tokyo, 8 May 2010
541	Ryohei Yamanaka	(Flyhalf)	v Arabian Gulf Tokyo, 8 May 2010
542	Atsushi Tanabe	Fullback	v Russia Tokyo, 6 Nov 2010
543	Itaru Taniguchi	(No. 8)	v Russia Tokyo, 6 Nov 2010
544	Atsushi Hiwasa	Scrum-half	v Hong Kong Hong Kong, 30 Apr 2011
545	Justin Ives	Lock	v Hong Kong Hong Kong, 30 Apr 2011
546	Taihei Ueda	Fullback	v Hong Kong Hong Kong, 30 Apr 2011
547	Takehisa Usuzuki	Wing	v UAE Dubai, 13 May 2011
548	Ryuta Ueno	(Hooker)	v Sri Lanka Colombo, 21 May 2011
549	Tadasuke Nishihara	Flanker	v Samoa Tokyo, 2 Jul 2011
550	Murray Williams	(Fullback)	v Samoa Tokyo, 2 Jul 2011
551	Ryuhei Arita	Hooker	v Kazakhstan Almaty, 28 Apr 2012
552	Jun Fujii	Scrum-half	v Kazakhstan Almaty, 28 Apr 2012
553	Shoji Ito	No. 8	v Kazakhstan Almaty, 28 Apr 2012
554	Yusuke Nagae	Prop	v Kazakhstan Almaty, 28 Apr 2012
555	Tomohiro Senba	Centre	v Kazakhstan Almaty, 28 Apr 2012
556	Yu Tamura	Centre	v Kazakhstan Almaty, 28 Apr 2012
557	Yuta Mochizuki	(Flanker)	v Kazakhstan Almaty, 28 Apr 2012
558	Harumichi Tatekawa	(Flyhalf)	v Kazakhstan Almaty, 28 Apr 2012
559	Hidetatsu Tsuboi	(Prop)	v Kazakhstan Almaty, 28 Apr 2012
560	Keisuke Uchida	(Scrum-half)	v Kazakhstan Almaty, 28 Apr 2012
561	Yoshikazu Fujita	Wing	v UAE Fukuoka, 5 May 2012
562	Daiki Hashimoto	Flanker	v UAE Fukuoka, 5 May 2012
563	Yusaku Kuwazuru	(Flanker)	v UAE Fukuoka, 5 May 2012
564	Kaito Morikawa	(Centre)	v UAE Fukuoka, 5 May 2012
565	Hendrik Tui	No. 8	v Tonga Tokyo, 10 Jun 2012
566	Michael Broadhurst	(Lock)	v Romania Bucharest, 10 Nov 2012
567	Masataka Mikami	Prop	v Philippines Fukuoka, 20 Apr 2013
568	Male Sa'u	Centre	v Philippines Fukuoka, 20 Apr 2013
569	Takuma Asahara	(Prop)	v Philippines Fukuoka, 20 Apr 2013
570	Kenki Fukuoka	(Wing)	v Philippines Fukuoka, 20 Apr 2013
571	Craig Wing	Centre	v UAE Dubai, 10 May 2013
572	Ryōto Nakamura	(Centre)	v UAE Dubai, 10 May 2013
573	Ryuta Yasui	(Flanker)	v UAE Dubai, 10 May 2013
574	Akihito Yamada	(Wing)	v Russia Colwyn Bay, 15 Nov 2013
575	Hayden Hopgood	No. 8	v Philippines Silangan, 3 May 2014
576	Kotaro Matsushima	Wing	v Philippines Silangan, 3 May 2014
577	Daishi Murata	Centre	v Philippines Silangan, 3 May 2014
578	Yasuki Hayashi	(Centre)	v Philippines Silangan, 3 May 2014
579	Kyosuke Horie	(Flanker)	v Philippines Silangan, 3 May 2014
580	Karne Hesketh	Wing	v Romania Bucharest, 15 Nov 2014
581	Amanaki Mafi	No. 8	v Romania Bucharest, 15 Nov 2014
582	Keita Inagaki	(Prop)	v Romania Bucharest, 15 Nov 2014
583	Shinnosuke Kakinaga	(Prop)	v Georgia Tbilisi, 23 Nov 2014
584	Chihito Matsui	Wing	v Korea Incheon, 18 Apr 2015
585	Tsuyoshi Murata	(Flanker)	v Korea Incheon, 18 Apr 2015
586	Kazuhiko Usami	(Lock)	v Korea Incheon, 18 Apr 2015
587	Tim Bennetts	(Wing)	v Canada San Jose, 18 Jul 2015
588	Takayuki Watanabe	(Prop)	v Uruguay Fukuoka, 22 Aug 2015
589	Taiyo Ando	Flanker	v Korea Kanagawa, 30 Apr 2016
590	Yu Chinen	Prop	v Korea Kanagawa, 30 Apr 2016
591	Takuya Ishibashi	Centre	v Korea Kanagawa, 30 Apr 2016
592	Kengo Kitagawa	Prop	v Korea Kanagawa, 30 Apr 2016
593	Kentaro Kodama	Wing	v Korea Kanagawa, 30 Apr 2016
594	Futoshi Mori	Hooker	v Korea Kanagawa, 30 Apr 2016
595	Ryuji Noguchi	Fullback	v Korea Kanagawa, 30 Apr 2016
596	Tevita Tatafu	No. 8	v Korea Kanagawa, 30 Apr 2016
597	Hiroki Yamamoto	Flanker	v Korea Kanagawa, 30 Apr 2016
598	Hajime Yamashita	Wing	v Korea Kanagawa, 30 Apr 2016
599	Kotaro Yatabe	Lock	v Korea Kanagawa, 30 Apr 2016
600	Kanta Higashionna	(Prop)	v Korea Kanagawa, 30 Apr 2016
601	Daisuke Inoue	(Scrum-half)	v Korea Kanagawa, 30 Apr 2016
602	Naohiro Kotaki	(Lock)	v Korea Kanagawa, 30 Apr 2016
603	Doga Maeda	(Flyhalf)	v Korea Kanagawa, 30 Apr 2016
604	Ataata Moeakiola	(Wing)	v Korea Kanagawa, 30 Apr 2016
605	Atsushi Sakate	(Hooker)	v Korea Kanagawa, 30 Apr 2016
606	Shokei Kin	Flanker	v Hong Kong Hong Kong, 7 May 2016
607	Shogo Miura	(Prop)	v Hong Kong Hong Kong, 7 May 2016
608	Masato Furukawa	Flanker	v Korea Incheon, 21 May 2016
609	Takuhei Yasuda	Wing	v Korea Incheon, 21 May 2016
610	Daigo Hashimoto	(Hooker)	v Korea Incheon, 21 May 2016
611	Faulua Makisi	(Flanker)	v Korea Incheon, 21 May 2016
612	Daiki Nakajima	(Scrum-half)	v Korea Incheon, 21 May 2016
613	Yoshiya Hosoda	Flanker	v Canada Vancouver, 11 Jun 2016
614	Mifiposeti Paea	Wing	v Canada Vancouver, 11 Jun 2016
615	Yasutaka Sasakura	Wing	v Canada Vancouver, 11 Jun 2016
616	Rikiya Matsuda	(Wing)	v Canada Vancouver, 11 Jun 2016
617	Kaito Shigeno	(Scrum-half)	v Canada Vancouver, 11 Jun 2016
618	Samuela Anise	Lock	v Argentina Tokyo, 5 Nov 2016
619	Uwe Helu	Flanker	v Argentina Tokyo, 5 Nov 2016
620	Kyosuke Kajikawa	Lock	v Argentina Tokyo, 5 Nov 2016
621	Lomano Lemeki	Wing	v Argentina Tokyo, 5 Nov 2016
622	Amanaki Lotoahea	Centre	v Argentina Tokyo, 5 Nov 2016
623	Yuhimaru Mimura	Flanker	v Argentina Tokyo, 5 Nov 2016
624	Satoshi Nakatani	Prop	v Argentina Tokyo, 5 Nov 2016
625	Malgene Ilaua	(Flanker)	v Argentina Tokyo, 5 Nov 2016
626	Heiichiro Ito	(Prop)	v Argentina Tokyo, 5 Nov 2016
627	Timothy Lafaele	(Centre)	v Argentina Tokyo, 5 Nov 2016
628	Shuhei Matsuhashi	(Flanker)	v Argentina Tokyo, 5 Nov 2016
629	Takahiro Ogawa	(Scrum-half)	v Argentina Tokyo, 5 Nov 2016
630	Koki Yamamoto	(Prop)	v Argentina Tokyo, 5 Nov 2016
631	Shunsuke Nunomaki	Flanker	v Georgia Tbilisi, 12 Nov 2016
632	Yasuo Yamaji	(Prop)	v Georgia Tbilisi, 12 Nov 2016
633	Takeshi Hino	(Hooker)	v Wales Millennium Stadium, 19 Nov 2016
634	Shintaro Ishihara	Prop	v Korea Incheon, 22 Apr 2017
635	Yutaka Nagare	Scrum-half	v Korea Incheon, 22 Apr 2017
636	Yuya Odo	Lock	v Korea Incheon, 22 Apr 2017
637	Jumpei Ogura	Flyhalf	v Korea Incheon, 22 Apr 2017
638	Seiya Ozaki	Fullback	v Korea Incheon, 22 Apr 2017
639	Naoki Ozawa	Flanker	v Korea Incheon, 22 Apr 2017
640	Yoshitaka Tokunaga	No. 8	v Korea Incheon, 22 Apr 2017
641	Daiki Yanagawa	Flanker	v Korea Incheon, 22 Apr 2017
642	Kohei Asahori	(Prop)	v Korea Incheon, 22 Apr 2017
643	Chikara Ito	(Wing)	v Korea Incheon, 22 Apr 2017
644	Genki Sudo	(Prop)	v Korea Incheon, 22 Apr 2017
645	Takuya Yamasawa	(Flyhalf)	v Korea Tokyo, 29 Apr 2017
646	Kanta Shikao	Centre	v Hong Kong Tokyo, 6 May 2017
647	Kosuke Horikoshi	(Hooker)	v Hong Kong Hong Kong, 13 May 2017
648	Derek Carpenter	Centre	v Romania Kumamoto, 10 Jun 2017
649	Yusuke Niwai	(Hooker)	v Romania Kumamoto, 10 Jun 2017
650	Will Tupou	Centre	v Ireland Shizuoka, 17 Jun 2017
651	Kazuki Himeno	Lock	v Australia Yokohama, 4 Nov 2017
652	Fetuani Lautaimi	(Flanker)	v Australia Yokohama, 4 Nov 2017
653	Sione Teaupa	(Centre)	v Australia Yokohama, 4 Nov 2017
654	Asaeli Ai Valu	(Prop)	v Australia Yokohama, 4 Nov 2017
655	Wimpie van der Walt	(Lock)	v Australia Yokohama, 4 Nov 2017
656	Koo Ji-won	Prop	v Tonga Toulouse, 18 Nov 2017
657	Masakatsu Nishikawa	(Flanker)	v Georgia Aichi, 23 Jun 2018
658	Jamie Henry	Wing	v New Zealand Tokyo, 3 Nov 2018
659	Isileli Nakajima	(Lock)	v New Zealand Tokyo, 3 Nov 2018
660	Yusuke Kajimura	(Centre)	v Russia Gloucester, 24 Nov 2018
661	Lappies Labuschagné	Flanker	v Fiji Kamaishi, 27 Jul 2019
662	James Moore	Lock	v Fiji Kamaishi, 27 Jul 2019
663	Yusuke Kizu	(Prop)	v Fiji Kamaishi, 27 Jul 2019
664	Takuya Kitade	(Hooker)	v South Africa Kumagaya, 6 Sep 2019
665	Siosaia Fifita	Wing	v Lions XV Murrayfield, 26 Jun 2021
666	Jack Cornelsen	(Lock)	v Lions XV Murrayfield, 26 Jun 2021
667	Craig Millar	(Prop)	v Lions XV Murrayfield, 26 Jun 2021
668	Naoto Saitō	(Scrum-half)	v Lions XV Murrayfield, 26 Jun 2021
669	Semisi Masirewa	Wing	v Ireland Lansdowne Road, 3 Jul 2021
670	Shane Gates	(Fullback)	v Ireland Lansdowne Road, 3 Jul 2021
671	Ben Gunter	Flanker	v Australia Oita, 23 Oct 2021
672	Dylan Riley	(Wing)	v Australia Oita, 23 Oct 2021
673	Shōgo Nakano		
674	Warner Dearns		
675	Shunsuke Asaoka		
676	Koji Iino		
677	Koga Nezuka		
678	Takeyama Koki		
679	Shuhei Takeuchi		
680	Kota Kaishi		
681	Sione Lavemai		
682	Taira Main		
683	Daichi Akiyama		
684	Gerhard van den Heever		
685	Sanaila Waqa		
686	Lee Seung-sin		
687	Yukio Morikawa		
688	Taichi Takahashi		
689	Takayasu Tsuji		
690	Kanji Shimokawa		
691	Hayata Nakao		
692	Amato Fakatava		
693	Jone Naikabula		
694	Shota Fukui		
695	Tomoki Osada		
696	Saumaki Amanaki		
697	Kenta Fukuda		
698	Tiennan Costley		
699	Mamoru Harada		
700	Takayoshi Mohara		
701	Samisoni Tua		
702	Yoshitaka Yazaki		
703	Keijiro Tamefusa		
704	Shinobu Fujiwara		
705	Kai Yamamoto		
