= 2004 Italy rugby union tour =

Summary
P	W	D	L
Total
3	2	0	1
Test match
2	1	0	1
Opponent
P	W	D	L
Romania
1	0	0	1
Japan
1	1	0	0

The 2004 Italy rugby union tour of Romania and Japan was a series of matches played during 2004 in Romania and Japan by the Italy national rugby union team.

== Results ==
26 June 2004

Romania	25–24	Italy
Try: Mersoiu, Tofan; Tonița; Con: Tofan 2 Drop: Dumbrava, Tofan		Try: Canale, Griffen; Mazzucato, Robertson; Con: Griffen, Mazzariol

Stadionul Arcul de Triumf, Bucharest
Referee: Robert Dickson (Scotland)

Romania:

15. Dănuț Dumbravă
14. Vasile Ghioc
13. Cristian Săuan
12. Romeo Gontineac
11. Bogdan Voicu
10. Ionuț Tofan
9. Lucian Sîrbu
8. Alin Petrache (c)
7. Ovidiu Tonița
6. Costica Mersoiu
5. Cristian Petre
4. Cornel Tatu
3. Marcel Socaciu
2. Bogdan Zebega
1. Petru Bălan
– Replacements:
16. Paulică Ion
17. Petrișor Toderașc
18. Valentin Ursache
19. Marius Bejan
20. Iulian Andrei
21. Stefan Dumitru
22. Ionuț Dimofte

Italy: 15. Gonzalo Canale
14. Nicola Mazzucato
13. Andrea Masi
12. Walter Pozzebon
11. Kaine Robertson
10. Francesco Mazzariol
9. Alessandro Troncon (c)
8. Andrea de Rossi
7. Aaron Persico
6. Enrico Pavanello
5. Carlo Del Fava
4. Marco Bortolami
3. Salvatore Costanzo
2. Fabio Ongaro
1. Andrea Lo Cicero
– Replacements:
16. Giorgio Intoppa
17. Mario Savi
18. Roberto Mandelli
19. Scott Palmer
20. Paul Griffen
21. Danilo Carpente
22. Matteo Barbini

30 June 2004

Junior Japan	5–22	Italy XV

Osaka

4 July 2004

Japan	19–32	Italy
Try: Onozawa; Con: Ikeda; Pen: Ikeda (3); Drop: Morita		Try: Canale Castrogiovanni (3); Con: Wakarua (3); Pen: Wakarua (2)

Chichibunomiya Rugby Stadium, Tokyo
Attendance: 14,000
Referee: Nigel Whitehouse (Wales)

Japan:

15. Kosuke Endo
14. Takafumi Hirao
13. Daisuke Ohata
12. Yukio Motoki
11. Hirotoki Onozawa
10. Kyohei Morita
9. Wataru Ikeda
8. Takeomi Ito
7. Takuro Miuchi (c)
6. Feletikiki Mau
5. Takanori Kumagae
4. Adam Parker
3. Ryo Yamamura
2. Yuji Matsubara
1. Yuichi Hisadomi
– Replacements:
16. Takashi Yamaoka
18. Lautangi Vatuvei
19. Koichi Kubo
21. Masatoshi Mukoyama
22. Keiji Takei
– Unused: 17. Yasumasa Miyamoto
20. Mamoru Ito

Italy:
15. Gonzalo Canale
14. Kaine Robertson
13. Andrea Masi
12. Matteo Barbini
11. Walter Pozzebon
10. Rima Wakarua
9. Paul Griffen
8. David dal Maso
7. Mauro Bergamasco
6. Enrico Pavanello
5. Marco Bortolami (c)
4. Carlo Del Fava
3. Martin Castrogiovanni
2. Fabio Ongaro
1. Andrea Lo Cicero
– Replacements:
16. Giorgio Intoppa
17. Mario Savi
18. Roberto Mandelli
19. Aaron Persico
20. Alessandro Troncon
21. Danilo Carpente
22. Nicola Mazzucato
