= Rugby union at the 2002 Asian Games – Men's tournament =

Men at the 2002 Asian Games
- Venue: Ulsan Public Stadium
- Date: 5–13 October 2002
- Competitors: 103 from 4 nations

Medalists
gold medal	South Korea
silver medal	Japan
bronze medal	Chinese Taipei

The 2002 Men's Asian Games Rugby union Tournament was held in Ulsan Public Stadium from October 5, 2002 to October 13, 2002.

South Korea won the gold medal in a round robin tournament.

== Squads ==
Chinese Taipei	Japan	South Korea	Sri Lanka
Chang Ching-fong; Chang Wei-cheng; Chen Chen-fu; Chen Chi-chung; Chen Wen-yen; Chen Yu-chen; Hsieh Cheng-chung; Hsieh Wen-kang; Huang Chen-hua; Huang Yu-ming; Hung Chi-hsiang; Lin Wen-cheng; Lin Yi-te; Ling Chang-heng; Pan Chih-ming; Pan Kuei-chih; Sun Cheng-yen; Tien Chung-i; Wang Kuo-feng; Wu Chih-hsien; Wu Chih-wei; Wu Shih-chieh; Yeh Teng-yuan; Yen Hsiang-hua; Yu Fuh-hsin; Yu Po-chin	Yuichi Hisadomi; Takeomi Ito; Kensuke Iwabuchi; Dai Katsuno; Tsuyoshi Kinoshita; Yoshiyuki Koike; Koichi Kubo; Toru Kurihara; Ryohei Miki; Takuro Miuchi; Yukio Motoki; Keiya Nishimura; Daisuke Ohata; Hirotoki Onozawa; Yuya Saito; Takamasa Sawaguchi; Masahiro Shichinohe; Kenji Shomen; Hiroyuki Tanuma; Ken Tsukagoshi; Shinichi Tsukida; Tetsuya Watanabe; Eiji Yamamoto; Masahito Yamamoto; Hiroki Yamazaki; Takashi Yoshida	Baek In-sung; Cho Chul-hyeong; Choi Chang-yeul; Choi Sung-hwan; Chun Jong-man; Han Young-hoon; Kim Dong-sun; Kim Hyung-ki; Kim Jae-sung; Kim Kwang-jae; Kim Kwang-mo; Kim Young-nam; Lee Jin-wook; Lee Kwan-hee; Lee Myung-geun; Park Chang-min; Park Jin-bae; Park Kwang-soo; Park No-young; Park Yong-don; Shin Woo-sik; Sung Hae-kyung; Um Soon-gil; Yong Hwan-myung; Yoo Min-suk; Yun Hi-su	Indrajith Bandaranayake; Pradeep Basnayake; Mohamed Buksh; Savantha de Saram; Lakshman Dissanayake; Anura Fernando; Nilusha Fernando; Pavithra Fernando; Jeeva Galgamuwa; Radhika Hettiarachchi; Saranath Hettiarachchi; Charaka Hewawasam; Nilufer Ibrahim; Sumedha Jayasinghe; Rajitha Jayasundara; Ravi Jayasuriya; Herathge Karunaratne; Kapila Knowlton; Sajith Mallikarachchi; Champika Nishantha; Harris Omar; Lakala Perera; Nalaka Weerakkody; Dilanka Wijesekera; Sameera Wijesinghe

== Results ==
All times are Korea Standard Time (UTC+09:00)

Pos	Team	Pld	W	D	L	PF	PA	PD	Pts
1	South Korea	3	3	0	0	165	60	+105	6
2	Japan	3	2	0	1	239	70	+169	4
3	Chinese Taipei	3	1	0	2	90	144	−54	2
4	Sri Lanka	3	0	0	3	35	255	−220	0

Source: Official website

5 October
12:00

South Korea	70–11	Sri Lanka

Public Stadium, Ulsan

5 October
14:00

Japan	76–19	Chinese Taipei

Public Stadium, Ulsan

9 October
12:00

Japan	129–6	Sri Lanka

Public Stadium, Ulsan

9 October
14:00

South Korea	50–15	Chinese Taipei

Public Stadium, Ulsan

13 October
12:00

Chinese Taipei	56–18	Sri Lanka

Public Stadium, Ulsan

13 October
14:00

South Korea	45–34	Japan

Public Stadium, Ulsan

== Final standing ==
Rank	Team	Pld	W	D	L
1st place, gold medalist(s)	South Korea	3	3	0	0
2nd place, silver medalist(s)	Japan	3	2	0	1
3rd place, bronze medalist(s)	Chinese Taipei	3	1	0	2
4	Sri Lanka	3	0	0	3
