= 2004 Japan rugby union tour of Europe =

Summary
P	W	D	L
Total
3	0	0	3
Test match
3	0	0	3
Opponent
P	W	D	L
Scotland
1	0	0	1
Romania
1	0	0	1
Wales
1	0	0	1

The 2004 Japan rugby union tour of Europe was a series of test-matches played in November 2004 in Scotland, Romania and Wales Europe by Japan rugby union team.

== Results ==
13 November 2004

Scotland	100–8	Japan
Try: Blair; Henderson; Hogg; Lamont; Macfadyen; Morrison; Parks; Paterson (3); Petrie; Russell (2); Southwell (2); Con: Paterson (11); Pen: Paterson		Try: Daimon; Pen: Ikeda

McDiarmid Park, Perth
Attendance: 10,000
Referee: Andrew Cole (Australia)

Scotland: 15. Hugo Southwell, 14. Chris Paterson, 13. Ben Hinshelwood, 12. Andrew Henderson, 11. Sean Lamont, 10. Dan Parks, 9. Chris Cusiter, 8. Jon Petrie, 7. Donnie Macfadyen, 6. Ally Hogg, 5. Nathan Hines, 4. Stuart Grimes, 3. Gavin Kerr, 2. Gordon Bulloch (c), 1. Allan Jacobsen – Replacements: 16. Robbie Russell, 17. Craig Smith, 18. Scott Macleod, 19. Jason White, 20. Mike Blair, 21. Gordon Ross, 22. Graeme Morrison
Japan: 15. Ryohei Miki, 14. Koichiro Kubota, 13. Seiichi Shimomura, 12. Yukio Motoki, 11. Hayato Daimon, 10.Keisuke Sawaki, 9. Wataru Ikeda, 8. Takuro Miuchi (c), 7. Hajime Kiso, 6. Naoya Okubo, 5. Hitoshi Ono, 4. Takanori Kumagae, 3. Ryo Yamamura, 2. Takashi Yamaoka, 1. Yuichi Hisadomi – Replacements: 16. Mitsugu Yamamoto, 17. Masahito Yamamoto, 18. Feletikiki Mau, 19. Takatoyo Yamaguchi, 20. Kiyonori Tanaka, 21. Masatoshi Mukoyama, 22. Hideyuki Yoshida

20 November 2004

Romania	25–10	Japan
Try: Săuan; Toderașc; Tudori; Con: Tofan 2 Pen: Tofan 2		Try: Miuchi; Con: Shimomura; Pen: Shimomura

Stadionul Arcul de Triumf, Bucharest
Referee: Donal Courtney (Ireland)

Romania: 15. Valentin Maftei, 14. Bogdan Voicu, 13. Cristian Săuan, 12. Romeo Gontineac, 11. Ion Teodorescu, 10. Ionuț Tofan, 9. Vali Calafeteanu, 8. Alin Petrache (c), 7. Alex Tudori, 6. Costica Mersoiu (red card) , 5. Cristian Petre, 4. George Oprisor, 3. Marcel Socaciu, 2. Răzvan Mavrodin, 1. Petru Bălan – Replacements: 16. Bogdan Zebega, 17. Cezar Popescu, 18. Petrișor Toderașc, 19. Valentin Ursache, 20. Iulian Andrei, 21. Ionuț Dimofte, 22. Dănuț Dumbravă
Japan: 15. Ryohei Miki, 14. Koichiro Kubota, 13. Seiichi Shimomura, 12. Masatoshi Mukoyama, 11. Hiroki Mizuno, 10. Hideyuki Yoshida, 9. Kiyonori Tanaka, 8. Takuro Miuchi (c), 7. Takatoyo Yamaguchi, 6. Naoya Okubo, 5. Hajime Kiso, 4. Takanori Kumagae, 3. Ryo Yamamura, 2. Takashi Yamaoka, 1. Masahito Yamamoto – Replacements: 17. Yuichi Hisadomi, 19. Feletikiki Mau, 20. Wataru Ikeda, 21. Yukio Motoki – Unused: 16. Mitsugu Yamamoto, 18. Hitoshi Ono, 22. Hayato Daimon

26 November 2004

Wales	98–0	Japan
Try: Charvis 4 Cooper; Davies; Jenkins; Shanklin (3); G. Williams (2); S. Williams (2); Con: Henson (14)

Millennium Stadium, Cardiff
Attendance: 56,380
Referee: Tappe Henning (South Africa)

Wales: 15. Rhys Williams, 14. Hal Luscombe, 13. Tom Shanklin, 12. Gavin Henson, 11. Shane Williams, 10. Ceri Sweeney, 9. Gareth Cooper, 8. Michael Owen, 7. Colin Charvis (c), 6. Dafydd Jones, 5. Jonathan Thomas, 4. Ryan Jones, 3. Gethin Jenkins, 2. Mefin Davies, 1. Duncan Jones – Replacements: 16. Steve Jones, 17. Adam Jones, 18. Alix Popham, 19. Martyn Williams, 21. Mike Phillips, 22. Kevin Morgan – Unused: 20. Matthew Watkins
Japan: 15. Ryohei Miki, 14. Koichiro Kubota, 13. Masatoshi Mukoyama, 12. Yukio Motoki, 11. Hayato Daimon, 10. Hideyuki Yoshida, 9. Wataru Ikeda, 8. Takuro Miuchi (c), 7. Feletikiki Mau, 6. Naoya Okubo, 5. Takanori Kumagae, 4. Hajime Kiso, 3. Ryo Yamamura, 2. Takashi Yamaoka, 1. Masahito Yamamoto – Replacements: 16. Mitsugu Yamamoto, 17. Tatsukichi Nishiura, 19. Takatoyo Yamaguchi, 20. Kiyonori Tanaka, 22. Tatsuhiko Otao – Unused: 18. Koichi Kubo, 21. Sadanobu Imari
