= Rugby union at the 2002 Asian Games =

- Venue: Ulsan Public Stadium
- Dates: 30 September – 13 October 2002
- Competitors: 151 from 8 nations

Rugby (Sevens and Union) was one of the many sports which was held at the 2002 Asian Games in Ulsan, South Korea. All games played at the Ulsan Public Stadium. The competition included only men's events.

== Schedule ==
●	Round	●	Last round	P	Preliminary round	½	Semifinals	F	Finals

Event↓/Date →	30th Mon	1st Tue		2nd Wed	3rd Thu	4th Fri	5th Sat	6th Sun	7th Mon	8th Tue	9th Wed	10th Thu	11th Fri	12th Sat	13th Sun
Men's union							●				●				●
Men's sevens	P	½	F												

== Medalists ==
=== Union ===
Event	Gold	Silver	Bronze
Men	South Korea; Baek In-sung; Cho Chul-hyeong; Choi Chang-yeul; Choi Sung-hwan; Chun Jong-man; Han Young-hoon; Kim Dong-sun; Kim Hyung-ki; Kim Jae-sung; Kim Kwang-jae; Kim Kwang-mo; Kim Young-nam; Lee Jin-wook; Lee Kwan-hee; Lee Myung-geun; Park Chang-min; Park Jin-bae; Park Kwang-soo; Park No-young; Park Yong-don; Shin Woo-sik; Sung Hae-kyung; Um Soon-gil; Yong Hwan-myung; Yoo Min-suk; Yun Hi-su	Japan; Yuichi Hisadomi; Takeomi Ito; Kensuke Iwabuchi; Dai Katsuno; Tsuyoshi Kinoshita; Yoshiyuki Koike; Koichi Kubo; Toru Kurihara; Ryohei Miki; Takuro Miuchi; Yukio Motoki; Keiya Nishimura; Daisuke Ohata; Hirotoki Onozawa; Yuya Saito; Takamasa Sawaguchi; Masahiro Shichinohe; Kenji Shomen; Hiroyuki Tanuma; Ken Tsukagoshi; Shinichi Tsukida; Tetsuya Watanabe; Eiji Yamamoto; Masahito Yamamoto; Hiroki Yamazaki; Takashi Yoshida	Chinese Taipei; Chang Ching-fong; Chang Wei-cheng; Chen Chen-fu; Chen Chi-chung; Chen Wen-yen; Chen Yu-chen; Hsieh Cheng-chung; Hsieh Wen-kang; Huang Chen-hua; Huang Yu-ming; Hung Chi-hsiang; Lin Wen-cheng; Lin Yi-te; Ling Chang-heng; Pan Chih-ming; Pan Kuei-chih; Sun Cheng-yen; Tien Chung-i; Wang Kuo-feng; Wu Chih-hsien; Wu Chih-wei; Wu Shih-chieh; Yeh Teng-yuan; Yen Hsiang-hua; Yu Fuh-hsin; Yu Po-chin

=== Sevens ===
Event	Gold	Silver	Bronze
Men	South Korea; Choi Chang-yeul; Chun Jong-man; Kim Hyung-ki; Kim Jae-sung; Lee Jin-wook; Lee Myung-geun; Park Chang-min; Park Jin-bae; Park No-young; Sung Hae-kyung; Yong Hwan-myung; Yoo Min-suk	Chinese Taipei; Chang Ching-fong; Chen Chen-fu; Chen Chi-chung; Chen Wen-yen; Huang Chen-hua; Pan Chih-ming; Sun Cheng-yen; Tien Chung-i; Wang Kuo-feng; Wu Chih-hsien; Wu Chih-wei; Wu Shih-chieh	Thailand; Nattawut Aryuwan; Paisak Chueakomhod; Jintawat Jeepetch; Sayan Kaewmoolmuk; Tanyavit Kuasint; Santi Meethavorn; Nattawut Petcharawuthikri; Chatree Phaksoontorn; Sarayuth Thiengtrong; Kitti Wangkanai; Korapong Wongsalungkarn; Nantawat Wongwanichslip

== Medal table ==
Rank	Nation	Gold	Silver	Bronze	Total
1	South Korea (KOR)	2	0	0	2
2	Chinese Taipei (TPE)	0	1	1	2
3	Japan (JPN)	0	1	0	1
4	Thailand (THA)	0	0	1	1
Totals (4 entries)		2	2	2	6

== Draw ==
The teams were drawn into two groups of four teams for sevens competition, rugby union competitions were played in round robin format.

Group A

- South Korea
- Malaysia
- Thailand
- Sri Lanka

Group B

- Japan
- China
- Hong Kong
- Chinese Taipei

== Final standing ==
=== Union ===
Rank	Team	Pld	W	D	L
1st place, gold medalist(s)	South Korea	3	3	0	0
2nd place, silver medalist(s)	Japan	3	2	0	1
3rd place, bronze medalist(s)	Chinese Taipei	3	1	0	2
4	Sri Lanka	3	0	0	3

=== Sevens ===
Rank	Team	Pld	W	D	L
1st place, gold medalist(s)	South Korea	5	5	0	0
2nd place, silver medalist(s)	Chinese Taipei	5	4	0	1
3rd place, bronze medalist(s)	Thailand	5	3	0	2
4	Japan	5	2	0	3
5	China	4	2	0	2
6	Sri Lanka	4	1	0	3
7	Hong Kong	3	0	0	3
7	Malaysia	3	0	0	3
