= Rugby sevens at the 2002 Asian Games – Men's tournament =

Men at the 2002 Asian Games
- Venue: Ulsan Public Stadium
- Date: 30 September – 1 October 2002
- Competitors: 96 from 8 nations

Medalists
gold medal	South Korea
silver medal	Chinese Taipei
bronze medal	Thailand

The 2002 Men's Asian Games Rugby sevens Tournament was held in Ulsan Public Stadium from September 30 to October 1, 2002.

== Squads ==
China	Chinese Taipei	Hong Kong	Japan
Deng Zhigang; He Zhongliang; Hu Ming; Mi Peng; Mu Hua; Wu Zhenling; Xu Hui; Xu Hui; Yuan Feng; Zhang Dong; Zhang Yang; Zhang Zhiqiang	Chang Ching-fong; Chen Chen-fu; Chen Chi-chung; Chen Wen-yen; Huang Chen-hua; Pan Chih-ming; Sun Cheng-yen; Tien Chung-i; Wang Kuo-feng; Wu Chih-hsien; Wu Chih-wei; Wu Shih-chieh	Dan Bailey; Chan Fuk Ping; Chan Wai Ping; Ricky Cheuk; Peter Choy; Alex Gibbs; Jung Ho Jung; Lee Cheuk Yin; Liu Kwok Leung; Terence Ng; Kelvin Yip; Yong Chi Fung	Kensuke Iwabuchi; Dai Katsuno; Yoshiyuki Koike; Koichi Kubo; Ryohei Miki; Takuro Miuchi; Kenji Shomen; Hiroyuki Tanuma; Shinichi Tsukida; Tetsuya Watanabe; Eiji Yamamoto; Takashi Yoshida
Malaysia	South Korea	Sri Lanka	Thailand
Zamri Abdul Kahar; Khairul Azhar; Syaiful Basyar Azuan; Mohd Shahuddin Baharom; Badrul Hisham Basri; Nor Hazmin Chamili; Mohd Fazarul Helmi; Mazlan Ismail; Lee Wei Ming; Ahmad Farid Rahman; Ahmad Faizal Salim; Yusoff Shahrom	Choi Chang-yeul; Chun Jong-man; Kim Hyung-ki; Kim Jae-sung; Lee Jin-wook; Lee Myung-geun; Park Chang-min; Park Jin-bae; Park No-young; Sung Hae-kyung; Yong Hwan-myung; Yoo Min-suk	Indrajith Bandaranayake; Radhika Hettiarachchi; Nilufer Ibrahim; Milinda Jayasinghe; Sumedha Jayasinghe; Ravi Jayasuriya; Herathge Karunaratne; Kapila Knowlton; Sajith Mallikarachchi; Lakala Perera; Nalaka Weerakkody; Dilanka Wijesekera	Nattawut Aryuwan; Paisak Chueakomhod; Jintawat Jeepetch; Sayan Kaewmoolmuk; Tanyavit Kuasint; Santi Meethavorn; Nattawut Petcharawuthikri; Chatree Phaksoontorn; Sarayuth Thiengtrong; Kitti Wangkanai; Korapong Wongsalungkarn; Nantawat Wongwanichslip

== Results ==
All times are Korea Standard Time (UTC+09:00)

=== Preliminary ===
==== Group A ====
Pos	Team	Pld	W	D	L	PF	PA	PD	Pts	Qualification
1	South Korea	3	3	0	0	115	24	+91	6	Semifinals
2	Thailand	3	2	0	1	62	47	+15	4	Semifinals
3	Sri Lanka	3	1	0	2	33	89	−56	2	Classification (5–6)
4	Malaysia	3	0	0	3	24	74	−50	0	

Source: Official website

30 September
12:00

South Korea	31–5	Malaysia

Public Stadium, Ulsan

30 September
12:25

Thailand	26–7	Sri Lanka

Public Stadium, Ulsan

30 September
13:40

Malaysia	5–24	Thailand

Public Stadium, Ulsan

30 September
14:05

South Korea	49–7	Sri Lanka

Public Stadium, Ulsan

30 September
15:20

South Korea	35–12	Thailand

Public Stadium, Ulsan

30 September
15:45

Malaysia	14–19	Sri Lanka

Public Stadium, Ulsan

==== Group B ====
Pos	Team	Pld	W	D	L	PF	PA	PD	Pts	Qualification
1	Chinese Taipei	3	3	0	0	70	7	+63	6	Semifinals
2	Japan	3	2	0	1	71	39	+32	4	Semifinals
3	China	3	1	0	2	35	52	−17	2	Classification (5–6)
4	Hong Kong	3	0	0	3	24	102	−78	0	

Source: Official website

30 September
12:50

Japan	19–7	China

Public Stadium, Ulsan

30 September
13:15

Hong Kong	0–29	Chinese Taipei

Public Stadium, Ulsan

30 September
14:30

China	28–14	Hong Kong

Public Stadium, Ulsan

30 September
14:55

Japan	7–22	Chinese Taipei

Public Stadium, Ulsan

30 September
16:10

Japan	45–10	Hong Kong

Public Stadium, Ulsan

30 September
16:35

China	0–19	Chinese Taipei

Public Stadium, Ulsan

=== Classification (5–6) ===
1 October
15:00

Sri Lanka	14–24	China

Public Stadium, Ulsan

=== Final round ===
Semifinals
1 October
South Korea	24
Japan	7
1 October
Chinese Taipei	19
Thailand	0

Final
1 October
South Korea	33
Chinese Taipei	21
Classification (3–4)
1 October
Japan	14
Thailand	17

==== Semifinals ====
1 October
14:00

South Korea	24–7	Japan

Public Stadium, Ulsan

1 October
14:30

Chinese Taipei	19–0	Thailand

Public Stadium, Ulsan

==== Classification (3–4) ====
1 October
16:00

Japan	14–17	Thailand

Public Stadium, Ulsan

==== Final ====
1 October
16:30

South Korea	33–21	Chinese Taipei

Public Stadium, Ulsan

== Final standing ==
Rank	Team	Pld	W	D	L
1st place, gold medalist(s)	South Korea	5	5	0	0
2nd place, silver medalist(s)	Chinese Taipei	5	4	0	1
3rd place, bronze medalist(s)	Thailand	5	3	0	2
4	Japan	5	2	0	3
5	China	4	2	0	2
6	Sri Lanka	4	1	0	3
7	Hong Kong	3	0	0	3
7	Malaysia	3	0	0	3
