= Rugby union at the 1998 Asian Games =

- Venue: Royal Thai Army Stadium
- Dates: 7–18 December 1998
- Nations: 7

Rugby (Sevens and Union) was one of the many sports which was held at the 1998 Asian Games in Bangkok, Thailand from December 7 to December 18, 1998.

== Schedule ==
P	Preliminary round	½	Semifinals	F	Finals

Event↓/Date →	7th Mon	8th Tue		9th Wed	10th Thu	11th Fri	12th Sat	13th Sun	14th Mon	15th Tue	16th Wed	17th Thu	18th Fri
Men's union					P		P		P		½		F
Men's sevens	P	½	F										

== Medalists ==
=== Union ===
Event	Gold	Silver	Bronze
Men	South Korea; An Jin-hwan; Baek In-sung; Choi Hyun-min; Chun Jong-man; Han Young-hoon; Kang Dong-ho; Kim Dong-sun; Kim Hyung-ki; Kim Jae-hyun; Kim Jae-sung; Kim Jin-heung; Kim Kwang-jae; Kim Kyung-woo; Kim Sung-nam; Kwak Chul-woong; Lee Je-kil; Lee Keun-wook; Lim Sung-soo; No Chul-ki; Park Jin-bae; Sung Hae-kyung; Woo Tae-il; Yong Hwan-myung; Yoo Jung-hyen; Yoo Min-oug; Yoo Min-suk	Japan; Shin Hasegawa; Takafumi Hirao; Keiji Hirose; Masami Horikoshi; Daisuke Hoshikawa; Takeomi Ito; Tsuyoshi Kinoshita; Atsushi Komura; Masahiro Kunda; Masahiro Kurokawa; Tsutomu Matsuda; Yukio Motoki; Wataru Murata; Ko Nakamura; Naoto Nakamura; Hideki Nanba; Kohei Oguchi; Katsuji Ohara; Daisuke Ohata; Masamitsu Oyabu; Masaaki Sakata; Yoshihiko Sakuraba; Keisuke Sawaki; Takayuki Sugata; Hiroyuki Tanuma; Osami Yatsuhashi	Chinese Taipei; Chang Chung-wei; Chen Chia-hsin; Chen Wei-chie; Cheng Chi-ho; Cheng Chia-wen; Cheng Yung-hui; Chuang Shih-lung; Ho Chang-lien; Huang Chen-hua; Huang Hung-lung; Huang Yu-ming; Hung Chi-hsiang; Kuo Shan-pen; Lin Fu-lung; Lin Shu-kai; Lin Yen-kuang; Lin Yi-lung; Lin Yi-te; Lu Kuang-jung; Mae Chyan-shuenn; Tsai Yin-chan; Tseng Chi-ming; Wen Kuang-liang; Wu Chih-hsien; Wu Shih-chieh; Yu Cheng-laing

=== Sevens ===
Event	Gold	Silver	Bronze
Men	South Korea; Chun Jong-man; Kang Dong-ho; Kim Hyung-ki; Kim Jae-hyun; Kim Jae-sung; Kwak Chul-woong; Lee Keun-wook; Park Jin-bae; Sung Hae-kyung; Yong Hwan-myung; Yoo Jung-hyen; Yoo Min-suk	Japan; Takafumi Hirao; Keiji Hirose; Takeomi Ito; Tsutomu Matsuda; Yukio Motoki; Wataru Murata; Ko Nakamura; Hideki Nanba; Daisuke Ohata; Keisuke Sawaki; Hiroyuki Tanuma; Osami Yatsuhashi	Thailand; Phongchak Chakshuraksha; Paisak Chueakomhod; Jintawat Jeepetch; Suwat Kaedkeaw; Sorat Klinpirom; Poj Laksanasompong; Samak Marod; Chatree Phaksoontorn; Sahapol Polpathapee; Chanchai Thaenkam; Chartchai Thaipakdee; Chatewut Watcharakhun

== Medal table ==
Rank	Nation	Gold	Silver	Bronze	Total
1	South Korea (KOR)	2	0	0	2
2	Japan (JPN)	0	2	0	2
3	Chinese Taipei (TPE)	0	0	1	1
3	Thailand (THA)	0	0	1	1
Totals (4 entries)		2	2	2	6

== Final standing ==
=== Union ===
Rank	Team	Pld	W	D	L
1st place, gold medalist(s)	South Korea	4	4	0	0
2nd place, silver medalist(s)	Japan	4	3	0	1
3rd place, bronze medalist(s)	Chinese Taipei	4	2	0	2
4	Sri Lanka	4	1	0	3
5	Kazakhstan	2	0	0	2
5	Thailand	2	0	0	2

=== Sevens ===
Rank	Team	Pld	W	D	L
1st place, gold medalist(s)	South Korea	5	5	0	0
2nd place, silver medalist(s)	Japan	4	3	0	1
3rd place, bronze medalist(s)	Thailand	4	2	0	2
4	Chinese Taipei	5	2	0	3
5	Hong Kong	3	1	0	2
6	Kazakhstan	4	1	0	3
7	Sri Lanka	3	0	0	3
