= Rugby union at the Asian Games =

Asian Games competition

- Governing bodies: WR (World) / AR (Asia)
- Events: 2 (men: 1; women: 1)

Games
- 1951; 1954; 1958; 1962; 1966; 1970; 1974; 1978; 1982; 1986; 1990; 1994; 1998; 2002; 2006; 2010; 2014; 2018; 2022; 2026
- Medalists

Rugby has been played at the Asian Games since the 1998 games in Bangkok, Thailand. In the 1998 and 2002 editions of the games, both the usual fifteen-a-side variety and rugby sevens were played, but from 2006 onwards, only rugby sevens was retained. In 2010, the women's rugby sevens event was introduced. The event is likely to remain a permanent fixture of the Asian Games due to elevation of rugby sevens as an Olympic sport from the 2016 Olympics onwards.

== Summary ==
=== Men's union ===
#	Year	Host	Final			Third place match			Teams
#	Year	Host	Winner	Score	Runner-up	3rd place	Score	4th place	Teams
1	1998	(Thailand); Bangkok	South Korea	21–17	Japan	Chinese Taipei	38–20	Sri Lanka	6
2	2002	(South Korea); Busan	South Korea	No playoffs	Japan	Chinese Taipei	No playoffs	Sri Lanka	4

=== Men's sevens ===
#	Year	Host	Final			Third place match			Teams
#	Year	Host	Winner	Score	Runner-up	3rd place	Score	4th place	Teams
1	1998	(Thailand); Bangkok	South Korea	29–14	Japan	Thailand	19–5	Chinese Taipei	7
2	2002	(South Korea); Busan	South Korea	33–21	Chinese Taipei	Thailand	17–14	Japan	8
3	2006	(Qatar); Doha	Japan	27–26	South Korea	China	19–12	Chinese Taipei	9
4	2010	(China); Guangzhou	Japan	28–21	Hong Kong	South Korea	21–14	China	9
5	2014	(South Korea); Incheon	Japan	24–12	Hong Kong	South Korea	17–14	Sri Lanka	12
6	2018	(Indonesia); Jakarta–Palembang	Hong Kong	14–0	Japan	South Korea	36–14	Sri Lanka	12
7	2022	(China); Hangzhou	Hong Kong	14–7	South Korea	Japan	21–19	China	13
8	2026	(Japan); Aichi–Nagoya	Hong Kong	26–0	China	Japan	17–5	South Korea	12

=== Women's sevens ===
#	Year	Host	Final			Third place match			Teams
#	Year	Host	Winner	Score	Runner-up	3rd place	Score	4th place	Teams
1	2010	(China); Guangzhou	Kazakhstan	17–14	China	Thailand	17–12 aet	Hong Kong	8
2	2014	(South Korea); Incheon	China	14–12	Japan	Kazakhstan	12–0	Hong Kong	10
3	2018	(Indonesia); Jakarta–Palembang	Japan	7–5	China	Kazakhstan	29–7	Thailand	8
4	2022	(China); Hangzhou	China	22–21	Japan	Hong Kong	7–5	Thailand	7
5	2026	(Japan); Aichi–Nagoya	Japan	10–5	China	Hong Kong	7–5	Thailand	8

== Medal table ==
=== Total ===
Rank	Nation	Gold	Silver	Bronze	Total
1	Japan (JPN)	5	6	2	13
2	South Korea (KOR)	4	2	3	9
3	Hong Kong (HKG)	3	2	2	7
4	China (CHN)	2	4	1	7
5	Kazakhstan (KAZ)	1	0	2	3
6	Chinese Taipei (TPE)	0	1	2	3
7	Thailand (THA)	0	0	3	3
Totals (7 entries)		15	15	15	45

=== MU ===
Rank	Nation	Gold	Silver	Bronze	Total
1	South Korea (KOR)	2	0	0	2
2	Japan (JPN)	0	2	0	2
3	Chinese Taipei (TPE)	0	0	2	2
Totals (3 entries)		2	2	2	6

=== MS ===
Rank	Nation	Gold	Silver	Bronze	Total
1	Japan (JPN)	3	2	2	7
2	Hong Kong (HKG)	3	2	0	5
3	South Korea (KOR)	2	2	3	7
4	China (CHN)	0	1	1	2
5	Chinese Taipei (TPE)	0	1	0	1
6	Thailand (THA)	0	0	2	2
Totals (6 entries)		8	8	8	24

=== WS ===
Rank	Nation	Gold	Silver	Bronze	Total
1	China (CHN)	2	3	0	5
2	Japan (JPN)	2	2	0	4
3	Kazakhstan (KAZ)	1	0	2	3
4	Hong Kong (HKG)	0	0	2	2
5	Thailand (THA)	0	0	1	1
Totals (5 entries)		5	5	5	15

== Participating nations ==
=== Men's union ===
Team	(Thailand) 1998	(South Korea) 2002	Years
Chinese Taipei	3rd	3rd	2
Japan	2nd	2nd	2
Kazakhstan	5th		1
South Korea	1st	1st	2
Sri Lanka	4th	4th	2
Thailand	5th		1
Teams (6)	6	4	_

=== Men's sevens ===
Team	(Thailand) 1998	(South Korea) 2002	(Qatar) 2006	(China) 2010	(South Korea) 2014	(Indonesia) 2018	(China) 2022	(Japan) 2026	Years
Afghanistan						9th	12th		2
China		5th	3rd	4th	6th	6th	4th	2nd	7
Chinese Taipei	4th	2nd	4th		8th	7th	8th		6
Hong Kong	5th	7th	5th	2nd	2nd	1st	1st	1st	8
India			8th	7th					2
Indonesia						11th			1
Japan	2nd	4th	1st	1st	1st	2nd	3rd	3rd	8
Kazakhstan	6th							10th	2
Lebanon					10th				1
Malaysia		7th		5th	9th	5th	6th	5th	6
Mongolia				9th					1
Nepal							13th		1
Pakistan					11th	10th			2
Philippines					5th		9th	6th	3
Qatar			9th						1
Saudi Arabia					12th				1
Singapore							7th	11th	2
South Korea	1st	1st	2nd	3rd	3rd	3rd	2nd	4th	8
Sri Lanka	7th	6th	6th	6th	4th	4th	10th	7th	8
Thailand	3rd	3rd	7th	8th	7th	8th	11th	9th	8
United Arab Emirates						12th	5th	8th	3
Uzbekistan								12th	1
Teams (22)	7	8	9	9	12	12	13	12	_

=== Women's sevens ===
Team	(China) 2010	(South Korea) 2014	(Indonesia) 2018	(China) 2022	(Japan) 2026	Years
China	2nd	1st	2nd	1st	2nd	5
Hong Kong	4th	4th	5th	3rd	3rd	5
India	7th			7th	6th	3
Indonesia			8th			1
Japan	5th	2nd	1st	2nd	1st	5
Kazakhstan	1st	3rd	3rd	5th	5th	5
Laos		10th				1
Malaysia		8th			8th	2
Singapore	6th	6th	6th	6th	7th	5
South Korea	8th	9th	7th			3
Thailand	3rd	5th	4th	4th	4th	5
Uzbekistan		7th				1
Teams (12)	8	10	8	7	8	_
