= Oguchi (surname) =

Oguchi (written: 小口 lit. "small mouth") is a Japanese surname. Notable people with the surname include:

- Daihachi Oguchi (小口 大八; 1924–2008), Japanese drummer
- Hisao Oguchi (小口 久雄; born 1960), Japanese businessman
- Kohei Oguchi (小口 耕平; born 1968), Japanese former rugby union player
- Takahisa Oguchi (小口 貴久; born 1979), Japanese luger
- Takako Oguchi (小口 貴子; born 1984), Japanese skeleton racer

Ōguchi, Ooguchi or Ohguchi (written: 大口 lit. "big mouth") is a separate Japanese surname, though it may be romanized the same way. Notable people with the surname include:

- Hiroshi Oguchi (大口 広司; 1950–2009), Japanese musician and actor
- Yoshinori Oguchi (大口 善徳; born 1955), Japanese politician
