= Milinda Jayasinghe =

- School: Nalanda College, Colombo

Rugby union career
- Position: Scrum half
Senior career
| Years | Team | Apps | (Points) |
- CR & FC
- CH & FC
International career
| Years | Team | Apps | (Points) |
- Sri Lanka
National sevens team
| Years | Team | | Comps |
- Sri Lanka

Milinda Jayasinghe (born 1978) is a former Sri Lankan rugby union player domiciled in New Zealand. He played for Sri Lanka in the Rugby Sevens tournament at the 2002 Asian Games.

== Career ==
Jayasinghe pursued his primary and secondary education at Nalanda College, Colombo. He played for Nalanda Rugby team from 1994 to 1998. After leaving school he represented CR & FC, CH & FC and Sri Lanka Air Force. He moved to New Zealand where he became a provincial rugby coach.

== See also ==
- Rugby union in Sri Lanka
