= Rugby union at the 1998 Asian Games – Men's tournament =

Men at the 1998 Asian Games
- Venue: Royal Thai Army Stadium
- Date: 10–18 December 1998
- Nations: 6

Medalists
gold medal	South Korea
silver medal	Japan
bronze medal	Chinese Taipei

The 1998 Men's Asian Games Rugby union Tournament was held at the Royal Thai Army Stadium from December 10 to December 18, 1998.

== Results ==
All times are Indochina Time (UTC+07:00)

=== Preliminary round ===
==== Group A ====
Pos	Team	Pld	W	D	L	PF	PA	PD	Pts	Qualification
1	South Korea	2	2	0	0	150	6	+144	4	Semifinals
2	Sri Lanka	2	1	0	1	21	96	−75	2	Semifinals
3	Thailand	2	0	0	2	9	78	−69	0	

Source: Results

10 December
16:00

South Korea	90–3	Sri Lanka

Royal Thai Army Stadium, Bangkok

12 December
19:00

Sri Lanka	18–6	Thailand

Royal Thai Army Stadium, Bangkok

14 December
19:00

South Korea	60–3	Thailand

Royal Thai Army Stadium, Bangkok

==== Group B ====
Pos	Team	Pld	W	D	L	PF	PA	PD	Pts	Qualification
1	Japan	2	2	0	0	183	9	+174	4	Semifinals
2	Chinese Taipei	2	1	0	1	33	76	−43	2	Semifinals
3	Kazakhstan	2	0	0	2	14	145	−131	0	

Source: Results

10 December
19:00

Japan	118–3	Kazakhstan

Royal Thai Army Stadium, Bangkok

12 December
16:00

Japan	65–6	Chinese Taipei

Royal Thai Army Stadium, Bangkok

14 December
16:00

Chinese Taipei	27–11	Kazakhstan

Royal Thai Army Stadium, Bangkok

=== Final round ===
Semifinals
16 December
Japan	116
Sri Lanka	0
16 December
South Korea	69
Chinese Taipei	5

Final
18 December
Japan	17
South Korea	21
Bronze medal match
18 December
Sri Lanka	20
Chinese Taipei	38

==== Semifinals ====
16 December
16:00

Japan	116–0	Sri Lanka

Royal Thai Army Stadium, Bangkok

16 December
19:00

South Korea	69–5	Chinese Taipei

Royal Thai Army Stadium, Bangkok

==== Bronze medal match ====
18 December
16:00

Sri Lanka	20–38	Chinese Taipei

Royal Thai Army Stadium, Bangkok

==== Final ====
18 December
19:00

Japan	17–21	South Korea

Royal Thai Army Stadium, Bangkok

== Final standing ==
Rank	Team	Pld	W	D	L
1st place, gold medalist(s)	South Korea	4	4	0	0
2nd place, silver medalist(s)	Japan	4	3	0	1
3rd place, bronze medalist(s)	Chinese Taipei	4	2	0	2
4	Sri Lanka	4	1	0	3
5	Kazakhstan	2	0	0	2
5	Thailand	2	0	0	2
