= Daniel Quate =

Japan international rugby union player

- Full name: Daniel George Quate
- Born: 2 April 1980 (age 46) Napier, New Zealand
- Height: 6 ft 4 in (193 cm)
- Weight: 242 lb (110 kg)

Rugby union career
- Position: Back-row / Lock
Super Rugby
Years	Team	Apps	(Points)
2003–04	Highlanders	12	
International career
Years	Team	Apps	(Points)
2009	Japan	1	(0)

Daniel George Quate (born 2 April 1980) is a New Zealand-born Japanese former international rugby union player.

== Rugby career ==
Born in Napier, Quate was a NZ Colts representative, who played his rugby as a lock and back-rower.

Quate played two Super 14 seasons with Highlanders, then had a stint in Italy with Amatori Catania, before being signed by Japanese club Toyota Verblitz for the 2005–06 Top League season. After five seasons in Japan, Quate returned to New Zealand and opened up a gym in Tauranga. He continued to play rugby with rural club Te Puna.

=== International ===
Quate appeared once for the Japan national team, as a substitute in a 2009 Test match against Canada in Sendai.

== See also ==
- List of Japan national rugby union players
