= David Bickle =

Japan international rugby union player

- Full name: David John Bickle
- Born: 21 August 1970 (age 56) Edinburgh, Scotland
- Height: 6 ft 8 in (203 cm)
- University: Durham University; University of Birmingham; Cambridge University
- Occupation: Chartered accountant

Rugby union career
- Position: Lock
International career
| Years | Team | Apps | (Points) |
| 1996 | Japan | 6 | (5) |

David John Bickle OBE (born 21 August 1970) is a British chartered accountant and former rugby union player.

== Biography ==
Born in Edinburgh, Scotland, Bickle was a 6 ft 8 in lock forward who played his early rugby in England, appearing for Wasps, Moseley and Cambridge University. He graduated from Durham University in 1991 with a degree in Geography and then attended Cambridge University, where he won a Cambridge blue in the 1992 Varsity Match. Following Cambridge he moved to Japan to work and play rugby for Kobe Steel. In 1996, Bickle was capped six times by the Japan national team. He continued competing with Kobe Steel until 1999.

Bickle served as president of the British Chamber of Commerce in Japan from 2014 to 2022. He was made an Officer of the Order of the British Empire (OBE) in the 2021 New Year Honours for services to UK/Japan relations.

== See also ==
- List of Japan national rugby union players
