= Koji Horaguchi =

Japan international rugby union player

- Born: November 3, 1953 Iwate Prefecture, Japan
- Died: 27 June 1999 (aged 45) Shibuya, Tokyo
- School: Kamaishi High School

Rugby union career
- Position: Prop
Senior career
Years	Team	Apps	(Points)
1985-1987	Kamaishi Seawaves		
- Toyoko Rugby Club
International career
Years	Team	Apps	(Points)
1979-1987	Japan	24	(0)
Coaching career
- Years: Team
- 199?-1999: IBM Big Blue

Koji Horaguchi (洞口孝治, Horaguchi Kōji), (3 November 1953 in Iwate – 27 June 1999) was a Japanese former rugby union player who played an active role as one of the main players of Nippon Steel Kamaishi, achieving the seven consecutive titles for the first time in the history of the Japanese championship.

== Biography ==
After graduating from the Kamaishi High School (currently, Kamaishi Commerce and Industry High School), Horaguchi joined Nippon Steel Kamaishi. In the team, he supported the first row of the scrum with his strong physique. He played every match with Nippon Steel Kamaishi during the seven consecutive Japanese championship victories from 1979 to 1985, where he was the vice-captain. Horaguchi became captain after the then-captain, Yuji Matsuo took office as player-coach.

== International career ==
As Japanese representative, his first match with the Japan national team was against England XV at Osaka, on 13 May 1979. He was also part of the 1987 Rugby World Cup roster, where he played two matches. After the pool match against England, at Sydney on 30 May 1987, he retired from the international career.

== After career ==
After retiring, he became a player-coach for Toyoko Rugby Club, but in 1999, during his tenure as coach for IBM Japan, he had a car accident while he was working and was taken to a hospital in Shibuya ward, where he died at the age of 45 years.
