= Ross Thompson (rugby union, born 1963) =

Japan international rugby union player

- Full name: Ross James Thompson
- Born: 15 July 1963 (age 63)
- Height: 6 ft 4 in (193 cm)
- Weight: 231 lb (105 kg)

Rugby union career
- Position: No. 8
Provincial / State sides
Years	Team	Apps	(Points)
1990–92	Auckland	10	(16)
International career
Years	Team	Apps	(Points)
1998	Japan	6	(25)

Ross James Thompson (born 15 July 1963) is a former Japan rugby union international .

A number eight, Thompson was an Auckland provincial player in the early 1990s and had a stint in Wales with Abertillery, before relocating to Japan, where he plied his trade with NEC Green Rockets.

Thompson made six capped appearances for Japan in 1998, scoring five tries.

== See also ==
- List of Japan national rugby union players
