= Radhika Hettiarachchi =

Sri Lankan rugby union player

- Born: 14 November 1977 (age 48)
- School: Dharmaraja College

Rugby union career
Senior career
Years	Team	Apps	(Points)
1997 – 2005	Kandy SC		
2008 – 2010	Colombo Hockey and Football Club		
International career
Years	Team	Apps	(Points)
- Sri Lanka
National sevens team
Years	Team		Comps
- Sri Lanka

Radhika Hettiarachchi (born 14 November 1977) is a Sri Lankan rugby union player and coach. He captained both Sri Lanka national rugby union team and Sri Lanka national rugby sevens team. He is regarded as one of the finest rugby sevens players to have emerged from Sri Lanka and he is also nicknamed as Iron Man of Sri Lanka Rugby.

== Career ==
He pursued his primary and secondary education at the Dharmaraja College in Kandy and joined Central Province XV rugby side just after leaving the school. He later signed up for Kandy Sports Club in 1997 where he spent major part of his club career and also had brief spells with Colombo Hockey and Football Club. He turned for Kandy SC from 1997 to 2005 and then after a gap of three years he returned to Kandy SC in 2008 and played for the club until 2010.

He was a member of the Sri Lankan side which finished at sixth position in the men's rugby sevens competition at the 2002 Asian Games and was also part of the fifteen member Sri Lankan squad which competed in the men's rugby union competition at the 2002 Asian Games.

Under his captaincy, Kandy Sports Club won the Caltex League Trophy as part of the Sri Lanka Rugby Championship in 2004. Under his captaincy tenure, Sri Lanka won Plate Championship titles in three consecutive years in 2003, 2004 and 2005 at the Singer Sri Lankan Airlines Sevens.

He was known for his exploits in a match against Australia at the 2009 Hong Kong Sevens series where he scored two crucial tries and also had physical contact with the Aussie opponents before scoring those tries. Despite his valiant efforts, Australia registered a comfortable victory with 56–12 at the end of the full time.

In 2009, he was initially handed a two-year ban for pulling out of the national squad in protest regarding the appointment of Pavithra Fernando as the captain of the side for the Dubai Asia Five Nations series. However, he was given green light by the ministry of sports to play for Sri Lanka at the 2009 Carlton Sri Lanka Rugby Sevens.

He was part of the Sri Lankan rugby team which finished at sixth position in the men's rugby sevens competition at the 2010 Asian Games. He also went onto captain relatively inexperienced Sri Lankan rugby sevens side which finished at thirteenth position in the men's rugby sevens competition during the 2010 Commonwealth Games. He also subsequently captained the national side at the 2010 Malaysia Sevens, 2010 Hong Kong Sevens and 2010 Singapore Sevens.

He joined Sri Lanka Air Force Sports Club during the latter part of his rugby playing career and later went onto become a coach after retiring from the game.

== Coaching career ==
He had two coaching spells with the Dharmaraja College XV in 2013/14 season and 2015/16 season. He guided Dharmaraja College to win their maiden inter-schools league rugby title in 2013. In 2017, he was approved to coach by Sri Lanka Rugby Football Union after serving a six-month ban for breaching the code of conduct during a school rugby encounter between St. Joseph's College and Dharmaraja College during 2016.

In June 2018, he was appointed as the head coach for both Nepal national men's and women's rugby teams by the Nepal Rugby Association. He was appointed as head coach of the Sri Lanka Army Sports Club in 2019 and was reappointed to the position again ahead of the 2020 club rugby season.

== See also ==
- Rugby union in Sri Lanka
