= Steve Miln =

Japan international rugby union player

- Full name: Stephen Crawford Miln
- Born: 26 February 1966 (age 60) Te Kūiti, New Zealand
- Height: 6 ft 0 in (183 cm)
- Weight: 198 lb (90 kg)

Rugby union career
- Position: Fullback
Provincial / State sides
Years	Team	Apps	(Points)
1988–90	Bay of Plenty	28	(33)
International career
Years	Team	Apps	(Points)
1998	Japan	5	(34)

Stephen Crawford Miln (born 26 February 1966) is a New Zealand-born former Japan rugby union international.

== Biography ==
A Te Kūiti-born fullback, Miln was a New Zealand Māori representative player and competed for Bay of Plenty from 1988 to 1990, then spent over a decade playing in Japan.

Miln represented the Japanese side at the 1997 Rugby World Cup Sevens and the following year made five capped appearances for the Japan XV, playing as a fullback and flyhalf.

Returning to New Zealand, Miln is a former Bay of Plenty assistant coach.

Miln has a son Coby that played professional rugby in Japan.

== See also ==
- List of Japan national rugby union players
