= Indrajith Bandaranayake =

Sri Lankan rugby union player

- School: Dharmaraja College

Rugby union career
Senior career
Years	Team	Apps	(Points)
1990 – 2005	Kandy SC		
International career
Years	Team	Apps	(Points)
- Sri Lanka
National sevens team
Years	Team		Comps
- Sri Lanka

Indrajith Bandaranayake is a former Sri Lankan rugby union player and coach. He currently lives in Australia.

== Career ==
He pursued his primary and secondary education at the Dharmaraja College in Kandy. He also played for the Dharmaraja College rugby team for one season. After leaving the school, he pursued his career in rugby and joined the Kandy Sports Club in 1990.

He was a crucial member of the Kandy SC club which went onto win the Clifford Cup for the first time in 1992 under the captaincy of Maurice Joachim. He became the youngest ever captain to lead the Kandy Sports Club at the age of 24. Under his captaincy, Kandy SC won the Sri Lanka Rugby Championship title in 1994.

He moved to Australia for personal reasons in 1996 and returned to Sri Lanka to play for Kandy Sports Club after a two year absence from the sport. He also captained Sri Lankan national side at the Singapore Sevens in 1998. He was once again appointed as the captain of Kandy SC in 2000 ahead of the Clifford Cup tournament which they won by defeating Sri Lanka Army Sports Club by 39 – 12 in the final.

He also featured in Sri Lankan national squads at the Asian Rugby Championship in 1992, 1994, 2000 and 2002. He was a member of the Sri Lankan side which finished at sixth position in the men's rugby sevens competition at the 2002 Asian Games and was also part of the fifteen member Sri Lankan squad which competed in the men's rugby union competition at the 2002 Asian Games. He retired from the sport in 2002 after being part of the Sri Lankan contingent at the 2002 Asian Games.

== Legacy ==
In September 2004, one of the terraces at Nittawela Rugby Stadium was named after Indrajith Bandaranayake and was declared open by the then Prime minister of Sri Lanka Mahinda Rajapakse.

== See also ==
- Rugby union in Sri Lanka
