= Mitsuru Sakamoto =

- Born: August 7, 1954 (age 72) Japan
- School: Nakoso Technical High School, Iwaki
- University: Daito Bunka University

Rugby union career
- Position: Flanker
Amateur team(s)
Years	Team	Apps	(Points)
- Nakoso Technical High School RFC
–	Daito Bunka University RFC		
Senior career
Years	Team	Apps	(Points)
–	Sanyo Electric		
International career
Years	Team	Apps	(Points)
1978–1980	Japan	3	(0)
National sevens team
Years	Team		Comps
1980	Japan		1980 Hong Kong Sevens
Coaching career
- Years: Team
- –: Shochi Fukaya High School RFC

Mitsuru Sakamoto (坂本 満, Sakamoto Mitsuru), born on 7 August 1954, is a Japanese former rugby union player and currently coach.

In his player career, he played as flanker.

== Career ==
After graduating from Nakoso Technical High School in Iwaki, Fukushima Prefecture, and from Daito Bunka University, Sakamoto went to play for Sanyo Electric.

He was capped three times for Japan, with his debut against France XV in Tokyo, 23 September 1978. His last cap was on 16 November 1980 against Korea in Taipei.

Sakamoto was also part of the Japan squad for the 1980 Hong Kong sevens.

After retiring as a player, he served as the head coach of the rugby team of the Shochi Fukaya High School from Fukaya.
