= Karl Todd =

Japan international rugby union player

- Full name: Karl Raymond Todd
- Born: 21 January 1972 (age 54)
- Height: 6 ft 5 in (196 cm)
- Weight: 230 lb (104 kg)
- School: Manurewa High School
- Occupation: Real estate agent

Rugby union career
- Position: Lock
Provincial / State sides
Years	Team	Apps	(Points)
1996	Counties Manukau	2	(0)
International career
Years	Team	Apps	(Points)
2000	Japan	3	(0)

Karl Raymond Todd (born 21 January 1972) is a New Zealand-born former Japan rugby union international.

A native of Auckland, Todd attended Manurewa High School and was a New Zealand Colts captain in 1993, leading a side that included many future All Blacks, including Andrew Mehrtens and Jeff Wilson.

Todd, standing at 6 ft 5 in, played his rugby as a lock and appeared in provincial rugby for Counties Manukau, before relocating to Japan for several seasons. He was called up to the Japan national team in 2000, playing two Pacific Rim Rugby Championship matches and a Test against Ireland at Lansdowne Road.

== See also ==
- List of Japan national rugby union players
