= Tsuyoshi Kinoshita =

Japan rugby union player (born 1975)

- Born: 5 July 1975 (age 51) Osaka Prefecture, Japan
- Height: 6 ft 1 in (185 cm)
- Weight: 244 lb (111 kg)
- University: Kyoto Sangyo University

Rugby union career
- Position: Prop / Lock
International career
Years	Team	Apps	(Points)
2002	Japan	2	(5)
Medal record
Rugby union
Representing Japan
Asian Games
Silver medal – second place	1998 Bangkok	Men's tournament
Silver medal – second place	2002 Ulsan	Men's tournament

Tsuyoshi Kinoshita (born 5 July 1975) is a Japanese former international rugby union player.

== Biography ==
Born in Osaka Prefecture, Kinoshita was a high school classmate of Daisuke Ohata. He studied at Kyoto Sangyo University, during which time he became a Kansai representative.

Kinoshita was picked for Japan's under-23 national side in 1997 and first represented the senior team at the 1998 Asian Games. He often played in the second row although his first two Japan caps was at prop against Tonga and South Korea in 2002. A two-time All-Japan Championship winner with the NEC Green Rockets, Kinoshita retired from rugby in 2010 and switched to American football, playing for X League side Obic Seagulls as an offensive player.

== See also ==
- List of Japan national rugby union players
