= Keiji Takei =

Japan international rugby union player (born 1980)

- Born: 1 June 1980 (age 46) Kanagawa Prefecture, Japan
- Height: 5 ft 9 in (175 cm)
- Weight: 176 lb (80 kg)
- University: Nihon University

Rugby union career
- Position: Fullback
International career
Years	Team	Apps	(Points)
2004–06	Japan	6	(25)

Keiji Takei (born 1 June 1980) is a Japanese former international rugby union player.

A fullback from Kanagawa Prefecture, Takei was capped six times by Japan between 2004 and 2006, which included qualifying matches for the 2007 Rugby World Cup. He scored five international tries.

Takei played his club rugby for NEC Green Rockets in Japan's Top League.

In 2013, Takei announced his retirement from professional rugby to focus on his career in the corporate sector.

== See also ==
- List of Japan national rugby union players
