= Satoshi Nakatani =

Japan international rugby union player

- Born: 27 October 1981 (age 45) Takatsuki, Osaka, Japan
- Height: 1.70 m (5 ft 7 in)
- Weight: 105 kg (16 st 7 lb; 231 lb)
- School: Shimamoto High School
- University: Ritsumeikan University

Rugby union career
- Position: Loosehead Prop / Hooker
Senior career
Years	Team	Apps	(Points)
2010−2019	Yamaha Júbilo	41	(0)
- Correct as of 15 January 2017
International career
Years	Team	Apps	(Points)
2016	Japan	4	(0)
- Correct as of 26 November 2016

Satoshi Nakatani (仲谷聖史, Nakatani Satoshi; born 27 October 1981) is a Japanese international rugby union player who plays as a prop. He currently plays for Yamaha Júbilo in Japan's domestic Top League.

== Club career ==
Nakatani is a long term member of the Yamaha Júbilo club.

== International ==
At the age of 35, Nakatani received his first call-up to Japan's senior squad ahead of the 2016 end-of-year rugby union internationals. He debuted in the number 1 jersey in new head coach, Jamie Joseph's first game, a 54-20 loss at home to Argentina.
