= Yuji Matsuo =

Japan international rugby union player

- Born: January 20, 1954 (age 72) Ebisu, Shibuya-ku, Tokyo, Japan
- School: Meguro Gakuin High School
- University: Meiji University

Rugby union career
- Position(s): Fly-half, Scrum-half
Senior career
Years	Team	Apps	(Points)
1970s-1985	Shin-Nittetsu Kamaishi		
International career
Years	Team	Apps	(Points)
1974-1984	Japan	24	(73)
National sevens team
Years	Team		Comps
1980	Japan 7s		
Coaching career
- Years: Team
- 2004-2012: Seijo University

Yuji Matsuo (松尾 雄治, Matsuo Yūji; born 20 January 1954) is a former Japanese rugby union player and a sports journalist. He played as a fly-half.

Matsuo was one of the greatest Japanese rugby players of all times and played for Shin-Nittetsu Kamaishi. He left competition in 1985, after seven consecutive wins.

He had 24 caps for Japan, from 1974 to 1984, scoring 3 tries, 5 conversions, 14 penalties and 3 drop goals, in an aggregate of 73 points.

After finishing his player career he became a sports journalist for the Japanese television.
