= Costica Mersoiu =

Romania international rugby union player

- Born: 30 October 1977 (age 49) Focșani, Romania
- Height: 6 ft 3 in (191 cm)
- Weight: 222 lb (101 kg)

Rugby union career
- Position: Back-row
International career
| Years | Team | Apps | (Points) |
| 2000–09 | Romania | 39 | (30) |

Costica Mersoiu (born 30 October 1977) is a Romanian former rugby union international.

Born in Focșani, Mersoiu was a back-rower and earned 39 Test caps for Romania, debuting in 2000.

Mersoiu received a two-year prison sentence in 2001 for manslaughter, having beaten to death his mother's live-in lover. Released from prison early for good behaviour, Mersoiu was rehabilitated back into the national team.

At club level, Mersoiu played locally for Steaua Bucarest and won a national title with the team in 2003, after which he competed in France with CA Périgueux and then AS Béziers.

Mersoiu scored a try in Romania's surprise win over Tier 1 team Italy in 2004. Due to injuries, Mersoiu missed both the 2003 and 2007 Rugby World Cups. He served for a period as national captain in 2007 and 2008.

== See also ==
- List of Romania national rugby union players
