= Kim Kwang-mo =

South Korean rugby player (born 1978)

- Born: 1978 (age 47–48) South Korea
- Height: 1.87 m (6 ft 2 in)
- Weight: 117 kg (18.4 st)

Rugby union career
- Position: Prop
Senior career
Years	Team	Apps	(Points)
- Panasonic
International career
Years	Team	Apps	(Points)
- South Korea

Kim Kwang Mo (born 1978) is a South Korean rugby union player. He plays as a prop for Korea and for Japanese club Panasonic Wild Knights.
