= Mitsugu Yamamoto =

Japanese rugby union player

- Born: 12 May 1981 (age 45) Japan
- Height: 1.74 m (5 ft 9 in)
- Weight: 114 kg (251 lb; 17 st 13 lb)

Rugby union career
- Position: Prop / Hooker
Senior career
| Years | Team | Apps | (Points) |
| 2004-2011 | Panasonic Wild Knights | 102 | (135) |
| 2012–2017 | Canon Eagles | 48 | (20) |
| 2019–2021 | Coca-Cola Red Sparks | 7 | (5) |
- Correct as of 6 May 2021
International career
| Years | Team | Apps | (Points) |
| 2004–2007 | Japan | 10 | (15) |
- Correct as of 6 May 2021

Mitsugu Yamamoto (山本光, Yamamoto Hikaru; born 12 May 1981) is a Japanese rugby union player who played as a prop or hooker. He's currently playing for Coca-Cola Red Sparks in Japan's domestic Top League. He was named in the Japan squad for the 2007 Rugby World Cup, but withdrew from the tournament due to injury. He made a further 10 appearances for Japan in his career, scoring three tries.
