= Wataru Ikeda =

Japan international rugby union player

- Born: 17 November 1975 (age 50) Higashimatsushima, Miyagi Prefecture, Japan
- Height: 5 ft 8 in (173 cm)
- Weight: 167 lb (76 kg)
- University: Ryutsu Keizai University

Rugby union career
- Position: Scrum-half
International career
Years	Team	Apps	(Points)
2004–06	Japan	14	(61)

Wataru Ikeda (born 17 November 1975) is a Japanese former professional rugby union player.

Born in Higashimatsushima, Miyagi Prefecture, Ikeda attended Miyagi Fisheries High School and got involved in rugby union as his elder brother was a player. He attended Ryutsu Keizai University.

Ikeda, a scrum-half, was with Sanyo Wild Knights for the inaugural Top League season in 2003–04 and earned a place in the tournament's best XV. He made his international debut with Japan in 2004 and was in the team for three years, gaining 14 caps, some as captain. In 2008, Ikeda transferred to Ricoh Black Rams, where he remained for the remainder of his career. He was the competition's oldest player at 39-year of age in his final season.

== See also ==
- List of Japan national rugby union players
