= Takafumi Hirao =

Japan international rugby union player

- Born: Tsuyoshi Hirao; 3 March 1975 (age 51) Osaka, Japan
- Height: 180 cm (5 ft 11 in)
- School: Doshisha Kori Junior High School
- University: Doshisha University

Rugby union career
- Position(s): Fullback, Wing
Senior career
Years	Team	Apps	(Points)
199?-1999	Mitsubishi Motors Kyoto		
1999-2006	Kobelco Steelers		
International career
Years	Team	Apps	(Points)
1998-2004	Japan	11	(25)

Takafumi Hirao (平尾 剛史, Hirao Takafumi), also known as Tsuyoshi Hirao (平尾剛, Hirao Tsuyoshi), (born Osaka, 3 May 1975) is a Japanese former rugby union player. He played as wing and as fullback. He is not related to the late Seiji Hirao. As of 2015 he works as teacher at Kobe Shinwa Women's University's Development and Education Faculty of Junior sports education Department, with "sports pedagogy", "kinematics" as field of specialization and "body and sports" and "sports education rooted in children's development" as research field.

== Career ==
Hirao started to play rugby since his first year at the secondary school days. He left the basketball club and joined the rugby club when the club members eagerly invited him to join them. He then accepted. Hirao attended Doshisha Kori Junior High School and Doshisha University, earning a master in commerce in the latter. He played for Mitsubishi Motors Kyoto and then, for Kobelco Steelers between 1999 and 2006. With Kobe Steel, Hirao won three Japan Championships in 2000, 2001 and 2004 and two All Japan Championship titles in 2000 and 2001. Hirao debuted for Japan in 1998, against South Korea in Bangkok, on 18 December. He was also part of the 1999 Rugby World Cup squad, playing only the match against Wales. His last cap was against Italy, in Tokyo, on 4 July 2004. As of March 2007, Hirao retired from playing due to the continuous concussions he had during play, resulting in diplopia and distortion of visibility. As of March 2008, he also was manager and coach of the Kobe club SCIX Rugby Club and completed a master's degree in pedagogy and graduated in letters in Kobe Shinwa Women's University.

== Books ==
- "Aikidō to ragubī o tsuranuku mono - jisedai no karada-ron" (Those who pass through Aikido and Rugby - next generation body theory（13/9/2007, Asahi Shinsho 64） ISBN 978-4022731647 - （co-author, along with Taro Uchida）
- "Chikakute tōi kono karada" (Near and far this body)（27/9/2014、Mishima-sha） ISBN 978-4903908557
- "Boku-ra no karada shugyō-ron" (Our theory of physical exercise)（9/3/2015, Asahi Shinsho） ISBN 978-4022618252 - （co-author, along with Taro Uchida）
