= Kensuke Iwabuchi =

Japan international rugby union player

- Born: December 30, 1975 (age 50) Tokyo, Japan
- Height: 5 ft 10 in (1.78 m)
- Weight: 176 lb (80 kg)

Rugby union career
- Position: Fly-half
Senior career
Years	Team	Apps	(Points)
2000-2001	Saracens		
International career
Years	Team	Apps	(Points)
1997-2002	Japan	20	(40)
National sevens team
Years	Team		Comps
	Japan		22
Coaching career
- Years: Team
- 2008-: Japan

Kensuke "Kenny" Iwabuchi (岩渕健輔 いわぶちけんすけ; born December 30, 1975, in Tokyo) is a Japanese rugby player and coach. He plays at stand off, and has 20 caps for the Japan national rugby union team. He also captained the Japan sevens team in the third sevens World Cup and was the first Japanese player to play professional rugby in England.

== Career ==
=== Player ===
In 1998 he graduated from Aoyama Gakuin University in Tokyo, entered Kobe Steel and joined Kobelco Steelers. In October he proceeded to study overseas at Cambridge University where he won a Blue and much praise for his efforts in The Varsity Match.

In July 2000 he graduated from Cambridge and left Kobe Steel at the same time. In August he became the first Japanese player to join an English Premiership team when he signed up with Saracens in the Aviva Premiership.

In 2002 he suffered a severe knee injury playing sevens rugby at the Pusan Asian tournament.

=== Coach ===
In 2004 he was strategy controller at Fukuoka Sanix Blues, on secondment from Saracens. In 2005 he was registered at Sanix as a player-coach. The following year he moved to US Colomiers in France.

In 2007 he was registered as player-coach of Secom Rugguts. He also works part-time as a guest commentator for J Sports and did so for the Rugby World Cup 2007.

On February 28, 2008, he was announced as coach of the Japan national sevens team, working with Wataru Murata as head coach.
