= Takanori Kumagae =

Japanese rugby union player

- Full name: Takanori Kumagae
- Born: 1 January 1978 (age 48) Fukuoka, Japan
- Height: 1.93 m (6 ft 4 in)
- Weight: 103 kg (16 st 3 lb; 227 lb)

Rugby union career
- Position: Lock
Senior career
Years	Team	Apps	(Points)
2010	NEC Green Rockets	7	(5)
- Correct as of 6 May 2021
International career
Years	Team	Apps	(Points)
2004–2007	Japan	26	(5)
- Correct as of 6 May 2021

Takanori Kumagae (熊谷皇紀, Kumagai kōki; born 1 January 1978) is a former Japanese rugby union player who played as a lock. He spent his whole career playing for NEC Green Rockets in Japan's domestic Top League, playing a single season. He was named in the Japan squad for the 2007 Rugby World Cup, making 1 appearance in the tournament. He made a further 25 appearances for Japan in his career, scoring one try.
