= Ulsan Public Stadium =

Sports venue in Ulsan, South Korea

- Interactive map of Ulsan Public Stadium
- Location: 865 Namoe-dong, Jung-gu, Ulsan, South Korea
- Coordinates: 35.562174°N 129.348065°E
- Owner: City of Ulsan
- Operator: City of Ulsan
- Capacity: 23,000
- Surface: Natural grass

Construction
- Groundbreaking: 1969
- Opened: 1970
- Demolished: 2003

Tenant
- Ulsan Hyundai (1990–2002)

Ulsan Public Stadium was a multi-purpose stadium located in Ulsan, South Korea. It opened in 1970. In 2003, the city of Ulsan demolished the stadium and built the Ulsan Sports Complex at the same location.

== See also ==
- Ulsan Stadium
