= Wataru Murata =

Japan international rugby union player

- Born: January 25, 1968 (age 58) Jōnan, Fukuoka, Japan
- Height: 5 ft 8 in (1.73 m)
- Weight: 165 lb (75 kg)
- School: Jonan High School; East Fukuoka High School
- University: Senshu University

Rugby union career
- Position: Scrum-half
Amateur team(s)
| Years | Team | Apps | (Points) |
| 1975-1980 | Kusagae Young Ruggers | | |
| 1980-1983 | Jonan High School | | |
| 1983-1986 | East Fukuoka High School | | |
| 1986-1990 | Senshu University RFC | | |
Senior career
| Years | Team | Apps | (Points) |
| 1990-1999 | Toshiba | 75 | |
| 1999-2001 | Bayonne | 40 | |
| 2001-2008 | Yamaha | 68 | |
International career
| Years | Team | Apps | (Points) |
| 1991-2005 | Japan | 41 | (0) |
Coaching career
- Years: Team
- 2008-2012: Japan Sevens
- 2012-: Senshu University

Wataru Murata (村田亙, Murata Wataru) (born 25 January 1968 in Jōnan) is a former Japanese rugby player and coach. He played as scrum-half. He currently coaches Senshu University Rugby Football Club.

== Career ==
Murata started rugby at elementary school. In the fourth year in the Senshu University Rugby Football Club, he contributed to victory of the Kanto University League title as captain. Later, his team played against Meiji University in the Kanto College match, which resulted in a 13-13 draw. Immediately after the game, even though it comes to drawing for a university championship, he pulled out tears and draw tears. After graduating from high school, he joined Toshiba Fuchu, he contributed to the third consecutive victory of the Japanese championship since 1996, demonstrating his playing style matching the "P to GO" tactics used by the then-coach Shogo Mukai. In 1990, he won a match against USA playing for Japan Under-23. Murata got his first cap in a test match against USA in 1991. He also took part at the 1991 Rugby World Cup in the match against Scotland, in the 1995 Rugby World Cup and in the 1999 Rugby World Cup. He earned 41 international caps for Japan.

In 1999, Murata signed a professional contract with Aviron Bayonnais of the French league and he became the first Japanese professional rugby union player. In the French league, he played 44 games and scored 7 tries, including two tries in the debut match., playing an active role as a central player in the team. At the time, on Rugby Magazine and on his official website, he reported his life in France.

In 2001, he moved to Yamaha Júbilo, leading the team with more sense of play. In 2002, he won the Kansai Company League for the first time.

In 2005, he returned to play for Japan at the age of 37, beating the caps record that Ross Thompson had. (this record was beaten by Hitoshi Ono for the 2019 Rugby World Cup). Also, he was the oldest player to participate in the Top League, at the age of 40.

In an article for the Monthly VS. magazine, Murata stated that he " can play up to 40 years in Top League". He took 40 years tas player, as he decided to continue playing in the 2007-08 Top League season.

As of January 2008, Murata announced that he will retire from his player career from the 2007-08 season. On 2 February, after the match against Toshiba Brave Lupus, his retirement ceremony was held, a bouquet was presented to Murata by his best friend, Jubilo Iwata player Masashi Nakayama, who was also at age 40, with which Murata also exchanged each other's jerseys.

In 2008, by request of the JRFU, Murata was appointed as coach of the Japan national rugby sevens team and assumed office. In the same year he led Japan at the Hong Kong Sevens for the first time. In October, he led Japan in the 2009 Rugby World Cup Sevens qualifiers in Hong Kong. He also coached Japan national sevens team in the World Cup Sevens, held in Dubai, in March 2009.

As of 2012, he was appointed coach for Senshu University Rugby Football Club Old Boys. Senshu returned to the first division in 2014 for the first time in 13 years. In addition to Nakayama, in the same age, Katsuyuki Kiyomiya was also present.
