= Kohei Oguchi =

Japan international rugby union player

- Born: October 6, 1968 (age 58) Saitama Prefecture, Japan
- Height: 5 ft 11 in (1.80 m)
- Weight: 233 lb (106 kg; 16.6 st)
- School: Daito Bunka University College
- University: Daito Bunka University

Rugby union career
- Position: Prop
Amateur team(s)
Years	Team	Apps	(Points)
19??-1997	Daito Bunka University RFC		
Senior career
Years	Team	Apps	(Points)
19??-97	Isetan		
1997-2000	Ricoh		
International career
Years	Team	Apps	(Points)
1997-2000	Japan	10	(0)

Kohei Oguchi (小口耕平, Oguchi Kōhei) (born Saitama Prefecture, 6 October 1968) is a Japanese former rugby union player. He played as a prop.

== Career ==
After graduating from Daito Bunka University, where he played in the All-Japan University Rugby Championship, Oguchi joined the Ricoh club, where he played throughout all of his career. He was first capped for Japan on 7 June 1997, against United States, in San Francisco. Oguchi was also called up in the 1999 Rugby World Cup squad coached by Seiji Hirao, playing two matches in the tournament. His last cap for Japan was against South Korea, in Aomori, on 2 July 2000.
