= Mau Touriki =

Japan international rugby union player

- Born: Feletiliki Mau; August 21, 1977 (age 49) Nukuʻalofa, Tonga
- Height: 1.9 m (6 ft 3 in)
- Weight: 120 kg (260 lb; 19 st)
- University: Daito Bunka University

Rugby union career
- Position: Lock
Senior career
Years	Team	Apps	(Points)
2001-2003	Ricoh Black Rams		
2004-2009	World Fighting Bull		
2010-2011	Canon Eagles		
2012 -	Fukuoka Sanix Blues		
International career
Years	Team	Apps	(Points)
2004	Japan	6	(0)

Mau Touriki (真羽闘力, Mau Tōriki), (real name:Feletiliki Mau) (born 21 August 1977) is a Tongan-Japanese rugby union player who played in Japan for World Fighting Bull and also played for the Japan national rugby union team. In 2005, he obtained Japanese citizenship. His first cap was against Russia in Tokyo, on 27 May 2004 and his last international cap was against Wales at the Millennium Stadium on 26 November 2004.
