= Ryohei Miki =

Japan international rugby union player

- Born: March 24, 1978 (age 48) Tokyo, Japan
- Height: 6 ft 2 in (1.88 m)
- Weight: 209 lb (95 kg; 14.9 st)
- School: Kyoto Gakuen High School
- University: Ryukoku University

Rugby union career
- Position(s): Wing, Centre
Amateur team(s)
Years	Team	Apps	(Points)
1996-1999	Ryukoku University RFC		
Senior career
Years	Team	Apps	(Points)
2000-2003	Toyota Motors		
2004-2005	World Co.		
2005-2008	Honda		
2008-2011	Sanyo Wild Knights		
International career
Years	Team	Apps	(Points)
1999-2004	Japan	9	(40)
National sevens team
Years	Team		Comps
2001-2005	Japan 7s		23

Ryohei Miki (三木亮平, Miki Ryōhei) (born Tokyo, 24 March 1978) is a former Japanese rugby union player. He played as wing and as centre.

== Career ==
In 1996, after graduating from Kyoto Gakuen High School, Miki entered Ryukoku University, where he would play the All-Japan University Rugby Championship. He debuted for Japan on 20 August 1999, against Spain. He also took part at the 1999 Rugby World Cup, but did not play any match in the tournament. In 2000, Miki graduated from Ryukoku University and joined the Toyota Motors club. A year later, he played for Japan Sevens in the 2001 Rugby World Cup Sevens. In 2004, he moved to World Fighting Bull in the Top League and ended his international career after a disastrous European tour in 2004, in the match against Wales, at the Millennium Stadium, on 26 November. In 2005, Miki was called up to play for Japan Sevens in the 2005 Rugby World Cup Sevens and moved to Honda Heat. In 2008, he moved to Sanyo Wild Knights. Miki retired as player in 2011 after playing the season for Panasonic Wild Knights.
