= Hiroyuki Tanuma =

Japan international rugby union player

- Born: May 24, 1973 (age 53) Kanagawa Prefecture, Japan
- Height: 193 cm (6 ft 4 in)
- Weight: 90 kg (198 lb)
- School: Shonan Gakuen High School, Fujisawa
- University: Nippon Sport Science University

Rugby union career
- Position: Lock
Amateur team(s)
Years	Team	Apps	(Points)
-1996	Nippon Sport Science University RFC		
Senior career
Years	Team	Apps	(Points)
1996-2010	Ricoh		
International career
Years	Team	Apps	(Points)
1996-2003	Japan	42	(10)
National sevens team
Years	Team		Comps
1996-1997	Japan 7s		91997
Coaching career
- Years: Team
- 2010: Ricoh Black Rams
- 2015: Nippon Sport Science University RFC

Hiroyuki Tanuma (田沼 広之, Tanuma Hiroyuki; born 24 May 1973 in Kanagawa) is a former Japanese rugby union player. He played as lock.

== Career ==
Tanuma attended Nippon Sport Science University, for whose club he played and won the Kanto Taikosen league university championship in 1995. In 1996 he graduated and joined Ricoh, where he played 14 consecutive seasons until his retirement as player in 2010. Tanuma was first capped for Japan against South Korea, in Taipei, on 9 November 1996. He also played three matches in the 1999 Rugby World Cup and played only one match in the 2003 Rugby World Cup, against France, in Townsville, on 18 October, which would be his last cap for Japan. Tanuma also played in the Japan Sevens team, where he played the 1997 Rugby World Cup Sevens. After his retirement in 2010, he coached Ricoh Black Rams and then, Nippon Sport Science University Rugby Football Club.
