= Takeomi Ito =

Japan international rugby union player

- Born: April 11, 1971 (age 55)
- Height: 6 ft 1 in (1.85 m)
- Weight: 202 lb (92 kg; 14.4 st)

Rugby union career
- Position: Loose forward
Senior career
Years	Team	Apps	(Points)
1993-2011	Kobelco Steelers		
2012-2018	Kamaishi Seawaves		
International career
Years	Team	Apps	(Points)
1996-2005	Japan	62	(30)
National sevens team
Years	Team		Comps
1992-1997	Japan		151993 - 1997

Takeomi Ito (伊藤剛臣, Itō Takeomi) (born April 11, 1971 in Tokyo, Japan) is a Japanese rugby union footballer. He plays rugby as blindside flanker or no.8 for Kobelco Steelers in the Japanese Top League and also in the Japan national rugby union team. He played in both the 1999 and 2003 World Cups.

== Away from rugby ==
She was joined SASUKE 38 at December 2020 and failed Stage 1 at Fish Bone.
