= Takuro Miuchi =

Japan international rugby union player

- Born: Takuro Miuchi; December 11, 1975 (age 50) Kitakyushu, Japan
- Height: 1.88 m (6 ft 2 in)
- Weight: 107 kg (16 st 12 lb)

Rugby union career
- Position: Number eight
Senior career
Years	Team	Apps	(Points)
1999-2009	NEC Green Rockets		
2000	Paese		
2010- present	NTT DoCoMo Red Hurricanes		
- Correct as of September 2012
International career
Years	Team	Apps	(Points)
2002 -	Japan	48	(10)
- Correct as of September 21, 2007

Takuro Miuchi (箕内 拓郎, Miuchi Takuro, born December 11, 1975) is a Japanese rugby union player, who plays number eight. He was captain of the Japan national rugby union team until relieved of that responsibility by Japan national team coach Jean-Pierre Elissalde in a surprise move during February 2006. He was recalled to the team for the IRB Pacific 5 Nations games, and has appeared in 2 World Cups - 2003 and 2007.

He also plays for NEC Green Rockets in the Top League, and was the NEC captain before Ryota Asano.

Under John Kirwan (appointed head coach January 1, 2007) he again became captain of Japan, and appeared in the Japanese squad for the 2007 World Cup and the 2008 IRB Pacific Nations Cup.

== Early life ==
Takuro is originally from Tobata ward in Kitakyushu city. He first learned rugby at Sayagatani rugby school, and played also for Yahata High School.

He played as a student for Kanto Gakuin University and for a year at Oxford University where he gained a blue. Miuchi's first international cap was on May 19, 2002 in a match against Russia.
