= Yukio Motoki =

Japan international rugby union player

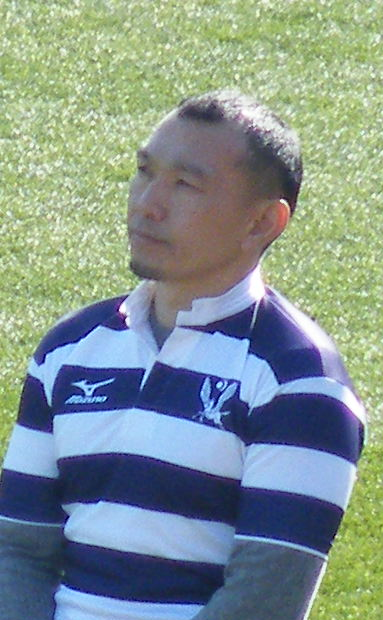
- Motoki in 2013
- Born: August 27, 1971 (age 55) Higashiōsaka, Osaka
- Height: 5 ft 10 in (1.78 m)
- Weight: 202 lb (92 kg)
- School: Aida High School, Higashiosaka
- University: Meiji University

Rugby union career
- Position: Centre
Amateur team(s)
Years	Team	Apps	(Points)
1987-1990	Aida HS, Higashiosaka		
1990-1994	Meiji University RFC		
Senior career
Years	Team	Apps	(Points)
1994-2010	Kobelco Steelers		
International career
Years	Team	Apps	(Points)
1991-2005	Japan	79	(45)

Yukio Motoki (元木由記雄, Motoki Yukio) (born Higashiōsaka, Osaka. August 27, 1971) is a former Japanese rugby union footballer. He played as a centre and was known for his powerful running and tackling.

== Club career ==
He played for Meiji University and for Kobelco Steelers in the Japanese Top League.

== International career ==
Motoki had 79 caps representing Japan, scoring 9 tries, 45 points in aggregate, from 1991 to 2005. He was selected for four Rugby World Cup finals: in 1991, without playing; in 1995, playing in three matches; in 1999, again in three matches; and in 2003. He never scored in any of his World Cup presences.
