= Japan national rugby sevens team =

Japan
- Union: Japan Rugby Football Union
- Coach: Simon Amor
- Captain: Yusaku Kuwazuru
Team kit

World Cup Sevens
- Appearances: 7 (First in 1993)
- Best result: 13th (1993)

The Japan national rugby sevens team participates in competitions such as the World Rugby Sevens Series and the Rugby World Cup Sevens.

== History ==
=== Hong Kong Sevens ===
Japan won the Plate match at the 1980 and 1999 Hong Kong Sevens.

In the 2007 Hong Kong Sevens, Japan reached Bowl semi-finals (19th place), where they lost against France; previously they had beaten Asian rivals China and Chinese Taipei. In 2008, they lost all four matches versus South Africa, Argentina, Russia and Hong Kong.

Japan won in 2009 against China and Sri Lanka, after which they lost the Bowl semi-finals versus Portugal. In 2010 they beat Hong Kong but were defeated by Scotland in Bowl quarter-finals, so they ended 13th.

The team won in 2011 against China, Scotland and the United States, then were beaten by Canada in the Bowl final to end 9th.

In the 2012 World Series qualifier at Hong Kong, Japan were defeated by Portugal and Russia and won against Guyana in the group phase. The team won against Hong Kong in quarter-finals, but was defeated by Spain in semi-finals and Portugal in the third-place match. so they failed to qualify for the World Series.

In the 2013 World Series pre-qualifier at Hong Kong, the team won all group phase matches against Brazil, Georgia and Jamaica. However, Georgia beat them in quarter-finals.

In the 2014 World Series qualifier at Hong Kong, Japan won the three group phase matches against Uruguay, Cook Islands and Trinidad and Tobago. Later they beat Tunisia, Russia and Italy to claim World Series core status for 2014/15.

=== Sevens World Series ===
Japan won the Plate final match (5th place) at the 2000 Japan Sevens, scoring 8 points for the 1999–2000 World Sevens Series. The team lost the Bowl final match to end 10th in the 2002 Australia Sevens and 2002 Singapore Sevens.

In the 2012 USA Sevens they reached Bowl semifinals (11th place). In the 2014 Japan Sevens they repeated that result.

Japan became a core team for the 2014–15 Sevens World Series. As hosts of the 2015 Japan Sevens, they won over Samoa, tied Argentina and lost to France to advance to Cup quarter-finals. They were defeated by Fiji and then Scotland, therefore resulting 7th in the tournament. However, they resulted last in seven out of ten events and finished 15th, therefore the team lost its core team status for 2015–16.

At the 2016 Wellington Sevens, Japan defeated France to reach Bowl semi-finals, where they lost to Scotland, therefore claiming 11th place. The team advanced to Cup quarter-finals of the 2016 USA Sevens after winning over Scotland and drawing versus England. They lost to Fiji and defeated Kenya to reach the Plate final, where they fell to New Zealand to clinch 6th place.

=== 2024 ===
Japan qualified for the Sevens Challenger Series and competed in the first round in Dubai. They were edged out of the quarter-final by eventual winners Kenya and then went on to beat Tonga for fifth place. They came ninth in the overall Challenger Series.

== Tournament Summary ==
=== Summer Olympic Games ===
Olympic Games record
Year	Round	Position	Pld	W	L	D
(Brazil) 2016	Semifinal	4th	6	3	3	0
(Japan) 2020	11th Place Match	11th	5	1	4	0
(France) 2024	11th Place Match	12th	5	0	5	0
Total	Fourth	3/3	16	4	13	0

Olympic Games History
2016	Pool stage	Japan 14 – 12 New Zealand	Win
2016	Pool stage	Japan 19 – 21 Great Britain	Loss
2016	Pool stage	Japan 31 – 7 Kenya	Win
2016	Quarterfinal	Japan 12 – 7 France	Win
2016	Semifinal	Japan 5 – 20 Fiji	Loss
2016	Bronze medal	Japan 14 – 54 South Africa	Loss
2020	Pool stage	Japan 19 – 24 Fiji	Loss
2020	Pool stage	Japan 0 – 34 Great Britain	Loss
2020	Pool stage	Japan 12 – 36 Canada	Loss
2020	9–12th place playoff	Japan 7 – 21 Kenya	Loss
2020	11th-place match	Japan 31 – 19 South Korea	Win
2024	Pool stage	Japan 12 – 40 New Zealand	Loss
2024	Pool stage	Japan 5 – 40 Ireland	Loss
2024	Pool stage	Japan 5 – 49 South Africa	Loss
2024	9–12th place playoff	Japan 7 – 42 Samoa	Loss
2024	11th-place match	Japan 10 – 21 Uruguay	Loss

=== Rugby World Cup Sevens ===
World Cup record
Year	Round	Position	Pld	W	L	D
(Scotland) 1993	Bowl Winner	13th	7	4	3	0
(Hong Kong) 1997	Bowl Finalist	17th	7	2	5	0
(Argentina) 2001	Plate Quarterfinalist	13th	6	3	3	0
(Hong Kong) 2005	Plate Quarterfinalist	13th	6	3	3	0
(United Arab Emirates) 2009	Bowl Quarterfinalist	21st	4	0	4	0
(Russia) 2013	Bowl Finalist	18th	6	2	3	1
(United States) 2018	Challenge Trophy Quarterfinalist	15th	4	2	2	0
Total	0 Titles	6/6	40	16	24	1

=== Asian Games ===
Asian Games record
Year	Round	Position	Pld	W	L	D
(Thailand) 1998	Runner-Up	2nd	4	3	1	0
(South Korea) 2002	Semifinalst	4th	5	2	3	0
(Qatar) 2006	Winners	1st	4	4	0	0
(China) 2010	Winners	1st	7	7	0	0
(South Korea) 2014	Winners	1st	6	6	0	0
(Indonesia) 2018	Runner-Up	2nd	6	5	1	0
Total	3 Titles	6/6	32	27	5	0

== Team ==
=== Current squad ===
12-member squad for the 2024 World Rugby Sevens Challenger Series in Dubai.

No.	Players
3	Yu Okudaira
4	Junya Matsumoto
6	Moeki Fukushi
7	Kippei Taninaka
8	Yoshihiro Noguchi
10	Tamakasa Maruo
11	Shotaro Tsuoka
12	Taisei Hayashi
14	Timo Fiti Sufia
15	Taichi Yoshizawa
18	Kippei Ishida
21	Kazuma Ueda

=== Coaches ===
- Wataru Murata - head coach from February 28, 2008
- Kensuke Iwabuchi - coach from February 28, 2008

== See also ==
- World Sevens Series
- Rugby World Cup Sevens
- Japan national rugby union team
