= Asia Rugby Sevens Series =

Asian rugby tournaments

- Sport: Rugby union
- Founded: 2009
- No. of teams: 12
- Most recent champion: Hong Kong (2025)
- Most titles: Hong Kong (8 titles)
- 2025 Asia Rugby Sevens Series

The Asia Rugby Sevens Series is an annual series of regional rugby sevens tournaments run by Asia Rugby featuring national sevens teams. It has been held regularly since 2009 to determine Asia's best men's national team in the sport of rugby sevens.

== History ==
The first season of the competition began in 2009 with two events happening in Shanghai and Borneo. In the first season, Japan took out the trophy after taking out the Borneo Sevens and finishing runner up in Shanghai.

== Tournaments ==
=== Asia Rugby Sevens Series ===
Tournaments that have featured as ranking events in the Asia Sevens Series include:

- China Sevens
- Hong Kong Sevens
- India Sevens
- Korean Sevens
- Malaysia Sevens
- Singapore Sevens
- Sri Lanka Sevens
- Thailand Sevens

Results

Host Year	China	Hong Kong	India	(South Korea) Korea	(Malaysia) Malaysia	(Singapore) Singapore	Sri Lanka	(Thailand) Thailand	(United Arab Emirates) United Arab Emirates	Ranking events
2009	Shanghai				Borneo		^{a} Colombo			2 ^{b}
2010	Shanghai				Borneo					2
2011	Shanghai		Goa ^{a}		Borneo			Bangkok ^{a}		2
2012	Shanghai		Mumbai		Borneo					3
2013			Mumbai		Kuala Lumpur	Singapore		Bang Saen		4
2014	Beijing	Hong Kong			Kuala Lumpur					3
2015 ^{c}	Qingdao						Colombo	Bangkok		3
2016		Hong Kong		Incheon			Colombo			3
2017		Hong Kong		Incheon			Colombo			3
2018		Hong Kong		Incheon			Colombo			3
2019	Huizhou			Incheon			Colombo			3
^{2020^{d}}_{^{(cancelled)}}	~~Huizhou~~			~~Incheon~~			~~Colombo~~			N/A
2021 ^{e}	~~Huizhou~~			~~Incheon~~			~~Colombo~~		Dubai	1
2022				Incheon				Bangkok	Ajman	3
2023				Incheon				Bangkok		2
2024	Hangzhou			Incheon				Bangkok		2
2025	Hangzhou						Colombo			2
Total	7	4	2 (+1)	6	6	1	5 (+1)	4 (+1)	2	37 (+3)

Series logo pre-2015

Notes:

^a Italics denotes tournaments that are non-ranking events not counting towards the annual series championship.

^b The inaugural 2009 series also included non-ranking events at Kish Island in Iran, Subic in the Philippines, and Brunei.

^c It was originally planned to use the 2015 Asian Sevens Series as the qualifier for the 2016 Olympics but the series clashed with the 2015 Rugby World Cup so a separate Asian Olympic qualifying tournament was held with the final stage hosted in Hong Kong.

^d The 2020 series was cancelled before any events were held, due to impacts of the COVID-19 pandemic.

^e Incheon, Huizhou and Colombo were originally scheduled as legs of the 2021 series. Due to impacts of the COVID-19 pandemic, all three of those events were cancelled and replaced – initially by two events planned for Dubai, but eventually by just one event in Dubai.

=== Asia Rugby Sevens Trophy ===
Year	Host	Winner	Runner-up	Refs
2017	Qatar	Philippines	Thailand	
2018	Singapore	United Arab Emirates	Singapore	
2019	Indonesia	Malaysia	Singapore	
2021	Qatar	United Arab Emirates	Iran	
2022	Indonesia	Singapore	Afghanistan	
2023	Qatar	Thailand	Bahrain	
2024	Nepal	Philippines	Chinese Taipei	
2025	Oman	Kazakhstan	India	

=== Trophy Titles ===
Team	Champion	Runner-up
Philippines	2	–
United Arab Emirates	2	–
Singapore	1	2
Thailand	1	1
Malaysia	1	–
Kazakhstan	1	–
Iran	–	1
Afghanistan	–	1
Bahrain	–	1
Chinese Taipei	–	1
India	–	1

== Honours ==
=== By Year ===
Year	Series winner	Runner-up	Refs
2009	Japan	South Korea	
2010	South Korea	Japan	
2011	Japan	Hong Kong	
2012	Hong Kong	Japan	
2013	Japan	Hong Kong	
2014	Hong Kong	South Korea	
2015	Japan	Hong Kong	
2016	Hong Kong	Sri Lanka	
2017	Japan	Hong Kong	
2018	Japan	Hong Kong	
2019	Japan	Hong Kong	
2020	Not contested		
2021	Hong Kong	South Korea	
2022	Hong Kong	South Korea	
2023	Hong Kong	Japan	
2024	Hong Kong	Japan	
2025	Hong Kong	Japan	

=== Series Titles ===
Team	Champion	Runner-up
Hong Kong	8	6
Japan	7	5
South Korea	1	4
Sri Lanka	–	1

== See also ==
- Asia Rugby Women's Sevens Series
