= 2022 Asia Rugby Sevens Series =

Rugby sevens tournament

- Hosts: Indonesia (Trophy); Thailand; South Korea; UAE
- Date: 6–7 August (Trophy); 22–23 October (Thailand); 12–13 November (South Korea); 26–27 November (UAE)

The 2022 Asia Rugby Sevens Series was the thirteenth edition of the Asia Rugby Sevens Series. The lower-tier Trophy tournament, hosted in Indonesia, served as a qualifier, with the top team qualifying for the main series hosted in Thailand, South Korea, and UAE.

The Asia Rugby Sevens Series issued an apology after the wrong national anthem was played for the Hong Kong Men's 7's team before the final of the Incheon Sevens.

== Teams ==
Asia Rugby Sevens Trophy

- Afghanistan
- Brunei
- Indonesia
- India
- Iran
- Iraq
- Jordan
- Kazakhstan
- Mongolia
- Pakistan
- Singapore
- Thailand

Asia Rugby Sevens Series

- China
- Hong Kong
- Japan
- Malaysia
- Philippines
- South Korea
- United Arab Emirates

== Schedule ==
The official schedules and venues for the 2022 Asia Rugby Sevens Trophy & Asia Rugby Sevens Series were:

2022 Sevens Series Trophy schedule
Leg	Stadium	City	Dates	Winner
Indonesia	JGBK Rugby Pitch	Jakarta	6–7 August	Singapore

2022 Sevens Series schedule
Leg	Stadium	City	Dates	Winner
Thailand	Boonyachinda Stadium	Bangkok	22–23 October	Hong Kong
Korea	Incheon Namdong Asiad Rugby Field	Incheon	12–13 November	Hong Kong
UAE	Al Ain Equestrian, Shooting and Golf Club	Al Ain	26–27 November	Hong Kong

== Trophy ==
The Trophy was held from 6 to 7 August at the JGBK Rugby Pitch in Jakarta.

=== Placings ===
Place	Team	Qualification
1	Singapore	
2	Afghanistan	
3	Thailand	
4	Iran	
5	Kazakhstan	
6	Mongolia	
7	Jordan	
8	Indonesia	
9	India	
10	Pakistan	
11	Brunei	
12	Iraq	

=== Pool stage ===
==== Pool A ====
Team	P	W	D	L	PF	PA	PD	Pts	Qualification
Singapore	2	2	0	0	102	7	+95	6	Advance to Cup playoffs
Indonesia	2	1	0	1	50	45	+5	4	Advance to Cup playoffs
Brunei	2	0	0	2	5	105	-100	2	9th place play-off

6 August
9:00

Indonesia	43–5	Brunei

6 August
12:20

Singapore	62–0	Brunei

6 August
15:40

Singapore	40–7	Indonesia

==== Pool B ====
Team	P	W	D	L	PF	PA	PD	Pts	Qualification
Kazakhstan	2	2	0	0	79	0	+79	6	Advance to Cup playoffs
Mongolia	2	1	0	1	47	25	+22	4	Advance to Cup playoffs
Iraq	2	0	0	2	0	101	-101	2	9th place play-off

6 August
9:25

Kazakhstan	54–0	Iraq

6 August
12:45

Mongolia	47–0	Iraq

6 August
16:05

Mongolia	0–25	Kazakhstan

==== Pool C ====
Team	P	W	D	L	PF	PA	PD	Pts	Qualification
Thailand	2	2	0	0	59	7	+52	6	Advance to Cup playoffs
Iran	2	1	0	1	52	31	+21	4	Advance to Cup playoffs
Pakistan	2	0	0	2	0	73	-73	2	9th place play-off

6 August
9:50

Pakistan	0–45	Iran

6 August
13:10

Thailand	31–7	Iran

6 August
16:30

Thailand	28–0	Pakistan

==== Pool D ====
Team	P	W	D	L	PF	PA	PD	Pts	Qualification
Afghanistan	2	2	0	0	58	21	+37	6	Advance to Cup playoffs
Jordan	2	1	0	1	28	43	-15	4	Advance to Cup playoffs
India	2	0	0	2	19	41	-22	2	9th place play-off

6 August
10:15

Afghanistan	31–14	Jordan

6 August
13:35

India	12–14	Jordan

6 August
16:55

India	7–27	Afghanistan

=== 9th place play-off ===
Team	P	W	D	L	PF	PA	PD	Pts	Qualification
India	3	3	0	0	56	5	+51	9	
Pakistan	3	2	0	1	49	12	+37	7	
Brunei	3	1	0	2	20	48	-28	5	
Iraq	3	0	0	3	0	60	-60	3	

7 August
09:00

Brunei	0–24	Pakistan

7 August
09:25

Iraq	0–20^{WLK}	India

7 August
11:30

Brunei	0–24	India

7 August
11:55

Iraq	0–20^{WLK}	Pakistan

7 August
14:00

Brunei	20–0^{WLK}	Iraq

7 August
14:25

Pakistan	5–12	India

=== Knockout stage ===
==== 5th–8th bracket ====
5th–8th playoffs
7 August - 09:50
Jordan	0
Mongolia	20
7 August - 10:15
Indonesia	0
Kazakhstan	50

Fifth place
7 August - 15:15
Mongolia	5
Kazakhstan	24
Seventh place
7 August - 14:50
Jordan	10
Indonesia	5

==== Cup playoffs ====
Quarterfinals
6 August - 19:00
Singapore	41
Jordan	0
6 August - 19:50
Afghanistan	24
Indonesia	0
6 August - 19:25
Mongolia	7
Thailand	26
6 August - 20:15
Iran	31
Kazakhstan	10

Semifinals
7 August - 10:40
Singapore	21
Thailand	7
7 August - 11:05
Afghanistan	22
Iran	0

Final
7 August - 17:20
Singapore	19
Afghanistan	5
Third place
7 August - 16:30
Thailand	22
Iran	5

== Series standings ==
Final standings over the three legs of the 2019 Asia Rugby Sevens Series:

Pos	Event Team	Bangkok	Incheon	Al Ain	Total points	Qualification or relegation
1st place, gold medalist(s)	Hong Kong	12	12	12	36	Entry to 2023 World Challenger Series
2nd place, silver medalist(s)	South Korea	8	10	4	22	Entry to 2023 World Challenger Series
3rd place, bronze medalist(s)	United Arab Emirates	7	4	10	21	
4	Japan	10	2	8	20	
5	China	5	5	7	17	
6	Philippines	4	8	5	17	
7	Sri Lanka	—	7	2	9	
8	Malaysia	2	1	1	4	Relegated to 2023 Asia Sevens Trophy

== Bangkok ==
The Thailand leg of the series was held from 22 to 23 October at the Boonyachinda Stadium in Bangkok. Sri Lanka was suspended from participating in this tournament.

=== Pool stage ===
==== Pool A ====
Team	P	W	D	L	PF	PA	PD	Pts	Qualification
Hong Kong	3	3	0	0	113	14	+99	9	Advance to Cup playoffs
United Arab Emirates	3	2	0	1	54	82	-28	7	Advance to Cup playoffs
China	3	1	0	2	80	78	+2	5	5th–8th bracket
Philippines	3	0	0	3	26	99	-73	3	5th–8th bracket

22 October
10:00

China	28–33	United Arab Emirates

Boonyachinda Stadium

22 October
10:25

Hong Kong	40–0	Philippines

Boonyachinda Stadium

22 October
13:20

China	38–14	Philippines

Boonyachinda Stadium

22 October
13:45

Hong Kong	42–0	United Arab Emirates

Boonyachinda Stadium

22 October
16:40

United Arab Emirates	21–12	Philippines

Boonyachinda Stadium

22 October
17:05

Hong Kong	41–14	China

Boonyachinda Stadium

==== Pool B ====
Team	P	W	D	L	PF	PA	PD	Pts	Qualification
Japan	3	3	0	0	69	14	+55	9	Advance to Cup playoffs
South Korea	3	2	0	1	58	26	+32	7	Advance to Cup playoffs
Malaysia	3	1	0	2	41	69	-27	5	5th–8th bracket

22 October
10:50

South Korea	31–14	Malaysia

Boonyachinda Stadium

22 October
14:10

Japan	37–7	Malaysia

Boonyachinda Stadium

22 October
17:30

South Korea	7–12	Japan

Boonyachinda Stadium

=== Knockout stage ===
==== Plate bracket ====
5th–8th playoffs
23 October – 11:30 – Boonyachinda Stadium
China	20
BYE	0
23 October – 11:55 – Boonyachinda Stadium
Philippines	19
Malaysia	14

Fifth place
23 October – 15:15 – Boonyachinda Stadium
China	41
Philippines	0
Seventh place
23 October – 14:50 – Boonyachinda Stadium
BYE	0
Malaysia	20

==== Cup playoffs ====
Semifinals
23 October – 12:20 – Boonyachinda Stadium
Hong Kong	26
South Korea	0
23 October – 12:45 – Boonyachinda Stadium
United Arab Emirates	5
Japan	19

Final
23 October – 16:30 – Boonyachinda Stadium
Hong Kong	36
Japan	19
Third place
23 October – 17:20 – Boonyachinda Stadium
South Korea	31
United Arab Emirates	0

== Incheon ==
The Korean leg of the series was held from 12 to 13 November in Incheon.

=== Pool stage ===
==== Pool A ====
Team	P	W	D	L	PF	PA	PD	Pts	Qualification
Hong Kong	3	2	1	0	78	29	49	8	Advance to Cup playoffs
Sri Lanka	3	2	0	1	47	43	-26	7	Advance to Cup playoffs
United Arab Emirates	3	1	1	1	61	57	4	6	Plate playoffs
China	3	0	0	3	41	68	-27	3	Plate playoffs

==== Pool B ====
Team	P	W	D	L	PF	PA	PD	Pts	Qualification
South Korea	3	3	0	0	79	31	48	9	Advance to Cup playoffs
Philippines	3	2	0	1	36	29	7	7	Advance to Cup playoffs
Japan	3	1	0	2	55	55	0	5	Plate playoffs
Malaysia	3	0	0	3	19	74	-55	3	Plate playoffs

=== Knockout stage ===
==== Plate playoffs ====
5th–8th playoffs
13 November – 11:30 – Incheon Namdong Asiad Rugby Field
United Arab Emirates	35
Malaysia	7
13 November – 11:50 – Incheon Namdong Asiad Rugby Field
China	31
Japan	10

Fifth place
13 November – 15:15 – Incheon Namdong Asiad Rugby Field
United Arab Emirates	21
China	31
Seventh place
13 November – 14:50 – Incheon Namdong Asiad Rugby Field
Malaysia	5
Japan	33

==== Cup playoffs ====
Semi Final
13 November – 12:20 – Incheon Namdong Asiad Rugby Field
Hong Kong	17
Philippines	0
13 November – 12:45 – Incheon Namdong Asiad Rugby Field
Sri Lanka	14
South Korea	31

Final
13 November – 17:20 – Incheon Namdong Asiad Rugby Field
Hong Kong	19
South Korea	12
Third Place
13 November – 16:30 – Incheon Namdong Asiad Rugby Field
Philippines	24
Sri Lanka	7

== Al Ain ==
The Arabian leg of the series was held from 26 to 27 November in Al Ain.

=== Pool stage ===
==== Pool A ====
Team	P	W	D	L	PF	PA	PD	Pts	Qualification
Hong Kong	3	3	0	0	99	36	63	9	Advance to Cup playoffs
China	3	2	0	1	64	56	8	7	Advance to Cup playoffs
Malaysia	3	1	0	2	47	78	-31	5	Plate playoffs
Sri Lanka	3	0	0	3	50	90	-40	3	Plate playoffs

==== Pool B ====
Team	P	W	D	L	PF	PA	PD	Pts	Qualification
United Arab Emirates	3	2	1	0	63	55	8	9	Advance to Cup playoffs
Japan	3	2	0	1	72	66	6	7	Advance to Cup playoffs
South Korea	3	1	0	2	55	58	-3	5	Plate playoffs
Philippines	3	0	1	2	36	47	-11	4	Plate playoffs

=== Knockout stage ===
==== Plate playoffs ====
5th–8th playoffs
– Al Ain
Malaysia	7
Philippines	33
– Al Ain
South Korea	26
Sri Lanka	19

Fifth place
– Al Ain
Philippines	24
South Korea	19
Seventh place
– Al Ain
Malaysia	12
Sri Lanka	26

==== Cup playoffs ====
Semi Final
– Al Ain
Hong Kong	33
Japan	7
– Al Ain
China	21
United Arab Emirates	26

Final
– Al Ain
Hong Kong	21
United Arab Emirates	5
Third Place
– Al Ain
Japan	33
China	21

== Incidents ==
A national anthem mix-up incident happened on 13 November. "Glory to Hong Kong" was played instead of "March of the Volunteers" as the national anthem of Hong Kong during the final of the Inchoen Sevens between Hong Kong and South Korea. Asia Rugby apologised and explained that it was down to "simple human error" made by a junior member of staff. The Chief Secretary for Administration, Eric Chan said the Hong Kong government raised "strong objection to the association for its inability" to prevent the mistake from happening. While Chief Executive John Lee said that the "song that was played was closely connected to the 2019 violence and disturbances, and advocacy for Hong Kong's independence," and said that the Organised Crime and Triad Bureau would investigate the matter. For similar incidents, see a list of wrong anthems incidents.

== See also ==
- 2022 Asia Rugby Women's Sevens Series
