= Korean Sevens =

- Sport: Rugby sevens
- First season: 2016
- No. of teams: 8
- Most recent champion: Japan (2019)

The Korean Sevens is an international rugby union sevens tournament contested by men's national teams. The tournament forms part of the Asian Sevens Series, and is hosted, as of 2017, in Incheon at the Namdong Rugby Field.

== Results ==
Year	Venue	Cup Final			Placings			Refs
Year	Venue	Winner	Score	Runner-up	Third	Fourth	Fifth	Refs
2016	Namdong Rugby Field	Hong Kong	36–0	Sri Lanka	South Korea	China	Malaysia	
2017	Namdong Rugby Field	South Korea	17–12	Japan	Hong Kong	China	Sri Lanka	
2018	Namdong Rugby Field	Japan	28–19	Hong Kong	China	South Korea	Philippines	
2019	Namdong Rugby Field	Japan	21–12	Hong Kong	China	South Korea	Sri Lanka	
2020	Namdong Rugby Field	Cancelled due to the COVID-19 pandemic						
2021	Namdong Rugby Field	Scheduled for 4–5 September 2021						
2022	Namdong Rugby Field	Hong Kong	19–12	South Korea	Philippines	Sri Lanka	China	
2023	Namdong Rugby Field	Japan	12-10	Hong Kong	South Korea	United Arab Emirates	China	

== See also ==
- Asian Sevens Series
