= 2015 ARFU Men's Sevens Championships =

- Hosts: Hong Kong
- Date: 7–8 November
- Nations: 10

Final positions
- Champions: Japan
- Runners-up: Hong Kong
- Third: South Korea

The 2015 ARFU Men's Sevens Championships is an Olympic qualification tournament for rugby sevens at the 2016 Summer Olympics which was held in Hong Kong on 7–8 November 2015. It was originally planned to use the 2015 Asian Sevens Series for the qualification but as the series clashed with the 2015 Rugby World Cup hosted in England, it was decided to use one qualifying tournament (with a pre-qualifying round) for Asia.

The Preliminary round was held in Chennai, India on 7–8 March 2015.

== Pre-qualifying round ==
=== Pool stage ===
Key to colours in group tables
Teams that advanced to the Semifinals

Teams	Pld	W	D	L	PF	PA	+/−	Pts
India	4	4	0	0	87	34	+53	12
Iran	4	3	0	1	98	22	+76	10
Uzbekistan	4	2	0	2	73	54	+19	8
United Arab Emirates	4	1	0	3	38	92	–54	6
Laos	4	0	0	4	33	127	–94	4

7 March 2015
11:00

India	17–15	Iran

Jawaharlal Nehru Stadium

7 March 2015
12:00

Uzbekistan	24–7	United Arab Emirates

Jawaharlal Nehru Stadium

7 March 2015
13:20

India	26–14	Laos

Jawaharlal Nehru Stadium

7 March 2015
13:40

Iran	24–0	United Arab Emirates

Jawaharlal Nehru Stadium

7 March 2015
16:00

India	32–0	United Arab Emirates

Jawaharlal Nehru Stadium

7 March 2015
16:20

Laos	7–39	Uzbekistan

Jawaharlal Nehru Stadium

7 March 2015
18:20

India	12–5	Uzbekistan

Jawaharlal Nehru Stadium

7 March 2015
18:40

Laos	0–31	Iran

Jawaharlal Nehru Stadium

8 March 2015
11:20

Uzbekistan	5–28	Iran

Jawaharlal Nehru Stadium

8 March 2015
11:40

United Arab Emirates	31–12	Laos

Jawaharlal Nehru Stadium

==== Semifinals ====
8 March 2015
14:00

India	17–5	United Arab Emirates

Jawaharlal Nehru Stadium

8 March 2015
14:20

Iran	19–0	Uzbekistan

Jawaharlal Nehru Stadium

==== Third Place Match ====
8 March 2015
16:15

Uzbekistan	10–7	United Arab Emirates

Jawaharlal Nehru Stadium

==== Final ====
8 March 2015
17:30

Iran	17–12	India

Jawaharlal Nehru Stadium

=== Final standing ===
Key to colours in group tables
Teams that advanced to the Olympic Qualifying round

Rank	Team
1	Iran
2	India
3	Uzbekistan
4	United Arab Emirates
5	Laos

== Olympic qualifying round ==
=== Teams ===
- China (Automatic qualifier)
- Chinese Taipei (Automatic qualifier)
- Hong Kong (Host Nation)
- Iran (Preliminary round qualifier)
- Japan (Automatic qualifier)
- Kazakhstan (Automatic qualifier) (withdrawn)
- Malaysia (Automatic qualifier)
- Philippines (Automatic qualifier)
- Singapore (Automatic qualifier)
- Sri Lanka (Automatic qualifier)
- South Korea (Automatic qualifier)
- Thailand (Automatic qualifier) (withdrawn)

=== Pool stage ===
Key to colours in group tables
Teams that advanced to the Cup Semifinals
Teams that advance to the Plate Semifinals
Teams that advance to 9th/10th place playoff

All match times are HKT (UTC+8).

==== Pool A ====
Teams	Pld	W	D	L	PF	PA	+/−	Pts
Japan	4	4	0	0	183	0	+183	12
South Korea	4	3	0	1	88	69	+19	10
China	4	2	0	2	86	53	+33	8
Singapore	4	1	0	3	19	141	−122	6
Chinese Taipei	4	0	0	4	25	138	−113	4

7 November 2015
09:00

China	22–0	Singapore

Hong Kong Stadium, Hong Kong

7 November 2015
09:22

South Korea	31–10	Chinese Taipei

Hong Kong Stadium, Hong Kong

7 November 2015
11:38

Japan	38–0	Chinese Taipei

Hong Kong Stadium, Hong Kong

7 November 2015
12:00

South Korea	19–14	China

Hong Kong Stadium, Hong Kong

7 November 2015
14:27

China	50–0	Chinese Taipei

Hong Kong Stadium, Hong Kong

7 November 2015
14:49

Japan	66–0	Singapore

Hong Kong Stadium, Hong Kong

7 November 2015
17:16

Singapore	19–15	Chinese Taipei

Hong Kong Stadium, Hong Kong

7 November 2015
17:38

Japan	45–0	South Korea

Hong Kong Stadium, Hong Kong

8 November 2015
10:24

South Korea	38–0	Singapore

Hong Kong Stadium, Hong Kong

8 November 2015
10:46

Japan	34–0	China

Hong Kong Stadium, Hong Kong

==== Pool B ====
Teams	Pld	W	D	L	PF	PA	+/−	Pts
Hong Kong	4	4	0	0	154	12	+142	12
Sri Lanka	4	3	0	1	117	52	+65	10
Malaysia	4	2	0	2	54	98	–44	8
Philippines	4	1	0	3	53	104	–51	6
Iran	4	0	0	4	32	144	–112	4

7 November 2015
9:44

Malaysia	15–10	Philippines

Hong Kong Stadium, Hong Kong

7 November 2015
10:06

Sri Lanka	31–10	Iran

Hong Kong Stadium, Hong Kong

7 November 2015
12:22

Hong Kong	46–0	Iran

Hong Kong Stadium, Hong Kong

7 November 2015
12:44

Sri Lanka	24–10	Malaysia

Hong Kong Stadium, Hong Kong

7 November 2015
15:11

Hong Kong	29–0	Philippines

Hong Kong Stadium, Hong Kong

7 November 2015
15:33

Malaysia	29–12	Iran

Hong Kong Stadium, Hong Kong

7 November 2015
18:00

Philippines	38–10	Iran

Hong Kong Stadium, Hong Kong

7 November 2015
18:22

Hong Kong	27–12	Sri Lanka

Hong Kong Stadium, Hong Kong

8 November 2015
11:08

Hong Kong	52–0	Malaysia

Hong Kong Stadium, Hong Kong

8 November 2015
11:32

Sri Lanka	50–5	Philippines

Hong Kong Stadium, Hong Kong

=== Playoffs ===
==== 9th/10th Place Playoff ====
8 November 2015
15:22

Chinese Taipei	22–5	Iran

Hong Kong Stadium, Hong Kong

==== Plate Semifinals ====
8 November 2015
13:54

China	26–15	Philippines

Hong Kong Stadium, Hong Kong

8 November 2015
14:16

Singapore	10–31	Malaysia

Hong Kong Stadium, Hong Kong

==== 7th/8th Place Playoff ====
8 November 2015
16:38

Philippines	24–12	Singapore

Hong Kong Stadium, Hong Kong

==== Plate Final ====
8 November 2015
17:00

China	38–5	Malaysia

Hong Kong Stadium, Hong Kong

==== Cup Semifinal ====
8 November 2015
14:38

Japan	43–0	Sri Lanka

Hong Kong Stadium, Hong Kong

8 November 2015
15:00

South Korea	10–19	Hong Kong

Hong Kong Stadium, Hong Kong

==== 3rd/4th Place Playoff ====
8 November 2015
17:22

Sri Lanka	21–26	South Korea

Hong Kong Stadium, Hong Kong

==== Cup Final ====
8 November 2015
18:20

Hong Kong	10–24	Japan

Hong Kong Stadium, Hong Kong

== Final standings ==
Legend
In qualification position for the 2016 Summer Olympics.
In qualification position for the Final 2016 Men's Olympic Qualification Tournament.

Rank	Team
1st place, gold medalist(s)	Japan
2nd place, silver medalist(s)	Hong Kong
3rd place, bronze medalist(s)	South Korea
4	Sri Lanka
5	China
6	Malaysia
7	Philippines
8	Singapore
9	Chinese Taipei
10	Iran
