= 2017 Asia Rugby Sevens Series =

- Hosts: Qatar (Trophy); Hong Kong; South Korea; Sri Lanka
- Date: 17 February - 14 October

The 2017 Asia Rugby Sevens Series is the ninth edition of Asia's continental sevens tournament. The lower-tier Trophy tournament hosted in Qatar served as a qualifier, with the top team qualifying for the main series hosted in Hong Kong, South Korea, and Sri Lanka.

The top two teams that are not already core teams on the Sevens World Series will earn qualification to the 2018 Hong Kong Sevens for a chance to earn core team status for the following World Series.

In addition, the 2017 edition of the Asian series serves as qualification to the 2018 Rugby World Cup Sevens, with the top two teams qualifying.

== Teams ==
Asia Rugby Sevens Trophy

- Bangladesh
- India
- Iran
- Jordan
- Nepal
- Pakistan
- Philippines
- Qatar
- Singapore
- Thailand
- United Arab Emirates

Asia Rugby Sevens Series

- China
- Chinese Taipei
- Hong Kong
- Japan
- Malaysia
- South Korea
- Sri Lanka
- Philippines

== Trophy ==
The men's Trophy was held 3–4 March at Aspire Rugby Football Centre, Doha, Qatar.

=== Group stage ===
Pool A

Legend
Advances to Cup quarter-finals
Advances to 9th-11th place round-robin

Teams	Pld	W	D	L	PF	PA	+/−	Pts
Singapore	2	2	0	0	50	20	+30	6
Pakistan	2	1	0	1	29	45	-16	4
Jordan	2	0	0	2	34	48	-14	2

3 Mar
13:30

Pakistan	24-19	Jordan

3 Mar
16:15

Singapore	24-5	Jordan

3 Mar
18:30

Singapore	26-5	Pakistan

Pool B

Teams	Pld	W	D	L	PF	PA	+/−	Pts
Philippines	2	2	0	0	93	5	+88	6
Qatar	2	1	0	1	58	26	+32	4
Nepal	2	0	0	2	0	120	-120	2

3 Mar
13:52

Qatar	53-0	Nepal

3 Mar
16:37

Philippines	67-0	Nepal

3 Mar
18:52

Philippines	26-5	Qatar

Pool C

Teams	Pld	W	D	L	PF	PA	+/−	Pts
United Arab Emirates	2	2	0	0	64	12	+52	6
India	2	0	0	2	12	64	-52	2

3 Mar
16:59

United Arab Emirates	19-12	India

3 Mar
19:14

United Arab Emirates	45-0	India

Pool D

Teams	Pld	W	D	L	PF	PA	+/−	Pts
Thailand	2	2	0	0	60	0	+60	6
Iran	2	1	0	1	33	36	-3	4
Bangladesh	2	0	0	2	5	62	-57	2

3 Mar
14:14

Iran	33-5	Bangladesh

3 Mar
17:21

Thailand	29-0	Bangladesh

3 Mar
19:36

Thailand	31-0	Iran

=== Knockout stage ===
9th-11th Place

Teams	Pld	W	D	L	PF	PA	+/−	Pts
Jordan	2	2	0	0	88	12	+76	6
Bangladesh	2	1	0	1	67	24	+43	4
Nepal	2	0	0	2	0	119	-119	2

4 Mar
13:00

Jordan	64-0	Nepal

4 Mar
15:38

Nepal	0-55	Bangladesh

4 Mar
17:50

Jordan	24-12	Bangladesh

5th-8th Place

Quarter-finals
4 Mar - 13:22
Philippines	42
Iran	0
4 Mar - 13:44
Singapore	19
India	7
4 Mar - 14:06
Qatar	5
Thailand	24
4 Mar - 14:28
Pakistan	10
United Arab Emirates	24

Semi-finals
4 Mar - 16:00
Iran	17
India	5
4 Mar - 16:22
Qatar	21
Pakistan	5

Final
4 Mar - 18:34
Iran	10
Qatar	24
Seventh Place
4 Mar - 18:12
India	14
Pakistan	12

Cup

Quarter-finals
4 Mar - 13:22
Philippines	42
Iran	0
4 Mar - 13:44
Singapore	19
India	7
4 Mar - 14:06
Qatar	5
Thailand	24
4 Mar - 14:28
Pakistan	10
United Arab Emirates	24

Semi-finals
4 Mar - 16:44
Philippines	12
Singapore	10
4 Mar - 17:06
Thailand	19
United Arab Emirates	17

Final
4 Mar - 19:18
Philippines	41
Thailand	7
Third place
4 Mar - 18:56
Singapore	14
United Arab Emirates	43

=== Final standings ===
Legend
Promoted to the main series for 2017

Rank	Team
1	Philippines
2	Thailand
3	United Arab Emirates
4	Singapore
5	Qatar
6	Iran
7	India
8	Pakistan
9	Jordan
10	Bangladesh
11	Nepal

== Main series ==
=== Hong Kong ===
Was held 1–2 September. All matches were held at King's Park Sports Ground. All times are Hong Kong Time (UTC+8).

Event	Winners	Score	Finalists	Semifinalists
Cup	Japan	19–12	Hong Kong	South Korea; China
Plate	Sri Lanka	32–19	Philippines	Malaysia; Chinese Taipei

Pool A

Teams	Pld	W	D	L	PF	PA	+/−	Pts
Hong Kong	3	3	0	0	95	12	+83	9
China	3	2	0	1	83	45	+38	7
Philippines	3	1	0	2	43	60	−17	5
Malaysia	3	0	0	3	14	118	−104	3

1 September 2017
14:14

Hong Kong	31–0	Malaysia

1 September 2017
14:36

China	22–5	Philippines

1 September 2017
16:44

Hong Kong	38–5	Philippines

1 September 2017
17:06

China	54–14	Malaysia

1 September 2017
19:14

Hong Kong	26–7	China

1 September 2017
19:36

Malaysia	0–33	Philippines

Pool B

Teams	Pld	W	D	L	PF	PA	+/−	Pts
Japan	3	3	0	0	104	15	+89	9
South Korea	3	2	0	1	77	54	+23	7
Sri Lanka	3	1	0	2	71	64	+7	5
Chinese Taipei	3	0	0	3	14	133	−119	3

1 September 2017
13:30

Sri Lanka	5–33	Japan

1 September 2017
13:52

South Korea	43–7	Chinese Taipei

1 September 2017
16:00

Sri Lanka	52–7	Chinese Taipei

1 September 2017
16:22

South Korea	10–33	Japan

1 September 2017
18:30

Japan	38–0	Chinese Taipei

1 September 2017
18:52

Sri Lanka	14–24	South Korea

Cup

Quarter-finals
2 September 2017 12:00
Philippines	12
South Korea	17
2 September 2017 12:22
Hong Kong	50
Chinese Taipei	0
2 September 2017 12:44
Malaysia	0
Japan	44
2 September 2017 13:06
China	36
Sri Lanka	12

Semi-finals
2 September 2017 15:22
South Korea	17
Hong Kong	22
2 September 2017 15:44
Japan	40
China	5

Final
2 September 2017 18:16
Hong Kong	12
Japan	19
Third place
2 September 2017 17:54
South Korea	14
China	7

Plate

Semi-finals
2 September 2017 14:38
Philippines	29
Chinese Taipei	5
2 September 2017 15:00
Malaysia	0
Sri Lanka	45

Final
2 September 2017 17:32
Philippines	19
Sri Lanka	32
Seventh Place
2 September 2017 17:10
Chinese Taipei	12
Malaysia	33

=== South Korea ===
Was held 23–24 September. All matches were held at Namdong Asiad Stadium in Incheon. All times are Korea Standard Time(UTC+9).

Event	Winners	Score	Finalists	Semifinalists
Cup	South Korea	17−12	Japan	Hong Kong; China
Plate	Sri Lanka	41−7	Malaysia	Philippines; Chinese Taipei

Pool A

Teams	Pld	W	D	L	PF	PA	+/−	Pts
Japan	3	3	0	0	137	12	+125	9
China	3	1	1	1	57	71	−14	6
Sri Lanka	3	1	1	1	57	97	−40	6
Chinese Taipei	3	0	0	3	24	95	−71	3

23 September 2017
10:44

Japan	47−5	Sri Lanka

23 September 2017
11:06

China	24−0	Chinese Taipei

23 September 2017
13:40

Japan	45−0	Chinese Taipei

23 September 2017
14:02

China	26−26	Sri Lanka

23 September 2017
16:36

Japan	45−7	China

23 September 2017
16:58

Sri Lanka	26−24	Chinese Taipei

Pool B

Teams	Pld	W	D	L	PF	PA	+/−	Pts
South Korea	3	3	0	0	103	36	+67	9
Hong Kong	3	2	0	1	88	36	+52	7
Malaysia	3	1	0	2	34	78	−44	5
Philippines	3	0	0	3	10	85	−75	3

23 September 2017
10:00

Hong Kong	36−0	Philippines

23 September 2017
10:22

South Korea	40−12	Malaysia

23 September 2017
12:56

Hong Kong	28−5	Malaysia

23 September 2017
13:18

South Korea	32−0	Philippines

23 September 2017
15:52

Philippines	10−17	Malaysia

23 September 2017
16:14

Hong Kong	24−31	South Korea

Cup

Quarter-finals
24 September 2017 11:28
Sri Lanka	7
Hong Kong	31
24 September 2017 11:50
Japan	34
Philippines	5
24 September 2017 12:12
Chinese Taipei	7
South Korea	52
24 September 2017 12:34
China	36
Malaysia	10

Semi-finals
24 September 2017 15:08
Hong Kong	7
Japan	19
24 September 2017 15:30
South Korea	33
China	12

Final
24 September 2017 18:26
Japan	12
South Korea	17
Third place
24 September 2017 17:42
Hong Kong	22
China	17

Plate

Semi-finals
24 September 2017 14:20
Sri Lanka	42
Philippines	0
24 September 2017 14:42
Chinese Taipei	21
Malaysia	26

Final
24 September 2017 16:58
Sri Lanka	41
Malaysia	7
Seventh Place
24 September 2017 16:36
Philippines	47
Chinese Taipei	5

=== Sri Lanka ===
Will be held 14–15 October. All matches will be held at Racecourse International Rugby Stadium in Colombo. All times are Sri Lanka Standard Time(UTC+5:30).

Event	Winners	Score	Finalists	Semifinalists
Cup	Hong Kong	19–14	Japan	Sri Lanka; South Korea
Plate	Philippines	19–17	Malaysia	China; Chinese Taipei

Pool A

Teams	Pld	W	D	L	PF	PA	+/−	Pts
South Korea	3	3	0	0	66	38	+28	9
Sri Lanka	3	2	0	1	82	35	+47	7
China	3	1	0	2	37	47	−10	5
Chinese Taipei	3	0	0	3	14	79	−65	3

14 October 2017
11:14

South Korea	28−21	Sri Lanka

14 October 2017
11:36

China	20−7	Chinese Taipei

14 October 2017
14:10

South Korea	26−7	Chinese Taipei

14 October 2017
14:36

China	7−28	Sri Lanka

14 October 2017
17:06

South Korea	12−10	China

14 October 2017
17:28

Sri Lanka	33−0	Chinese Taipei

Pool B

Teams	Pld	W	D	L	PF	PA	+/−	Pts
Hong Kong	3	3	0	0	72	29	+43	9
Japan	3	2	0	1	64	31	+33	7
Malaysia	3	1	0	2	31	77	−46	5
Philippines	3	0	0	3	39	69	−30	3

14 October 2017
10:30

Japan	28−7	Malaysia

14 October 2017
10:52

Hong Kong	21−17	Philippines

14 October 2017
13:26

Japan	29−5	Philippines

14 October 2017
13:48

Hong Kong	32−5	Malaysia

14 October 2017
16:22

Malaysia	19−17	Philippines

14 October 2017
16:44

Japan	7−19	Hong Kong

Cup

Quarter-finals
15 October 2017 − 11:28
China	12
Japan	26
15 October 2017 − 11:50
South Korea	17
Philippines	12
15 October 2017 − 12:12
Chinese Taipei	0
Hong Kong	50
15 October 2017 − 12:34
Sri Lanka	22
Malaysia	5

Semi-finals
15 October 2017 − 15:34
Japan	15
South Korea	10
15 October 2017 − 15:56
Hong Kong	26
Sri Lanka	12

Final
15 October 2017 − 18:58
Japan	14
Hong Kong	19
Third place
15 October 2017 − 18:14
South Korea	5
Sri Lanka	22

Plate

Semi-finals
15 October 2017 − 14:20
China	10
Philippines	26
15 October 2017 − 14:42
Chinese Taipei	0
Malaysia	17

Final
15 October 2017 − 17:24
Philippines	19
Malaysia	17
Seventh Place
15 October 2017 − 17:02
China	27
Chinese Taipei	7

=== Final standings ===
Legend
Qualified to 2018 Hong Kong Sevens
and 2018 Rugby World Cup Sevens

Rank	Team	Hong Kong	South Korea	Sri Lanka	Points
1	Japan	12	10	10	32
2	Hong Kong	10	8	12	30
3	South Korea	8	12	7	27
4	Sri Lanka	5	5	8	18
5	China	7	7	2	16
6	Philippines	4	2	5	11
7	Malaysia	2	4	4	10
8	Chinese Taipei	1	1	1	3

== See also ==
- 2018 Rugby World Cup Sevens qualifying – Men
- 2017 Asia Rugby Women's Sevens Series
