= 2018 Asia Rugby Sevens Series =

- Hosts: Singapore (Trophy); Hong Kong; South Korea; Sri Lanka
- Date: 4 August – 14 October

The 2018 Asia Rugby Sevens Series was the tenth edition of Asia's continental sevens circuit. The lower-tier Trophy tournament, hosted in Singapore, served as a qualifier, with the top team qualifying for the main series hosted in Hong Kong, South Korea, and Sri Lanka.

Japan won all three tournaments of the 2018 series to retain their title as champions of Asia. Hong Kong and Philippines, as the two highest placed teams not already having core status on the Sevens World Series, gained entry to the 2019 Hong Kong Sevens for a chance to qualify as core teams for the following World Series.

United Arab Emirates won the 2018 Asia Rugby Sevens Trophy, and qualified to the 2019 Asia Rugby Sevens Series, replacing the eighth placed team of 2018 Asia Rugby Sevens Series. Malaysia.

== Teams ==
Asia Rugby Sevens Trophy

- Bangladesh
- Brunei
- Indonesia
- Jordan
- Kazakhstan
- Laos
- Nepal
- Pakistan
- Singapore
- Thailand
- United Arab Emirates
- Uzbekistan

Asia Rugby Sevens Series

- China
- Chinese Taipei
- Hong Kong
- Japan
- Malaysia
- Philippines
- South Korea
- Sri Lanka

== Trophy ==
The men's trophy was held 4–5 August at Queenstown Stadium in Singapore. All times in Singapore Standard Time (UTC+08:00).

=== Pool stage ===
Legend
Advances to Cup
Advances to Plate
Advances to Bowl

Pool A

Teams	Pld	W	D	L	PF	PA	+/−	Pts
Thailand	3	3	0	0	104	10	+94	9
Kazakhstan	3	2	0	1	61	26	+35	7
Uzbekistan	3	1	0	2	27	83	–56	5
Laos	3	0	0	3	14	87	–73	3

4 August
11:58

Thailand	47–0	Uzbekistan

Queenstown Stadium

4 August
12:20

Kazakhstan	22–7	Laos

Queenstown Stadium

4 August
14:43

Thailand	43–0	Laos

Queenstown Stadium

4 August
15:05

Uzbekistan	5–29	Kazakhstan

Queenstown Stadium

4 August
17:28

Thailand	14–10	Kazakhstan

Queenstown Stadium

4 August
17:50

Uzbekistan	22–7	Laos

Queenstown Stadium

Pool B

Teams	Pld	W	D	L	PF	PA	+/−	Pts
United Arab Emirates	3	3	0	0	129	10	+119	9
Indonesia	3	1	0	1	81	52	+29	7
Jordan	3	1	0	1	26	60	–34	5
Nepal	3	0	0	2	5	119	–114	3

4 August
10:30

United Arab Emirates	48–0	Nepal

Queenstown Stadium

4 August
10:52

Jordan	7–19	Indonesia

Queenstown Stadium

4 August
13:15

United Arab Emirates	45–5	Indonesia

Queenstown Stadium

4 August
13:37

Nepal	5–14	Jordan

Queenstown Stadium

4 August
16:00

Nepal	0–57	Indonesia

Queenstown Stadium

4 August
16:22

United Arab Emirates	36–5	Jordan

Queenstown Stadium

Pool C

Teams	Pld	W	D	L	PF	PA	+/−	Pts
Singapore	3	3	0	0	144	7	+137	9
Pakistan	3	2	0	1	43	43	0	7
Brunei	3	1	0	2	0	0	–75	5
Bangladesh	3	0	0	3	0	0	–62	3

4 August
11:14

Singapore	52–0	Bangladesh

Queenstown Stadium

4 August
11:36

Pakistan	19–5	Brunei

Queenstown Stadium

4 August
13:59

Singapore	66–0	Brunei

Queenstown Stadium

4 August
14:21

Pakistan	17–12	Bangladesh

Queenstown Stadium

4 August
16:44

Bangladesh	21–26	Brunei

Queenstown Stadium

4 August
17:06

Singapore	26–7	Pakistan

Queenstown Stadium

=== Knockout stage ===
Bowl

Semi-finals
5 August – 11:00 – Queenstown Stadium
Bangladesh	26
Laos	12
5 August – 11:22 – Queenstown Stadium
Brunei	22
Nepal	7

Bowl Final
5 August – 14:00 – Queenstown Stadium
Bangladesh	26
Brunei	12
Eleventh place
5 August – 14:22 – Queenstown Stadium
Laos	31
Nepal	7

Plate

Semi-finals
5 August – 11:44 – Queenstown Stadium
Pakistan	19
Jordan	5
5 August – 12:06 – Queenstown Stadium
Indonesia	12
Uzbekistan	10

Plate Final
5 August – 14:44 – Queenstown Stadium
Pakistan	5
Indonesia	12
Seventh place
5 August – 15:06 – Queenstown Stadium
Jordan	28
Uzbekistan	5

Cup

Semi-finals
5 August – 12:28 – Queenstown Stadium
United Arab Emirates	26
Thailand	0
5 August – 12:50 – Queenstown Stadium
Singapore	33
Kazakhstan	10

Cup Final
5 August – 15:50 – Queenstown Stadium
United Arab Emirates	14
Singapore	0
Third place
5 August – 15:28 – Queenstown Stadium
Thailand	17
Kazakhstan	19

=== Final standings ===
Legend
Promoted to the main series for 2019

Rank	Team
1	United Arab Emirates
2	Singapore
3	Kazakhstan
4	Thailand
5	Indonesia
6	Pakistan
7	Jordan
8	Uzbekistan
9	Bangladesh
10	Brunei
11	Laos
12	Nepal

== Main Series ==
=== Hong Kong ===
The tournament was held 14–15 September in Hong Kong. All times in Hong Kong Time (UTC+08:00).

==== Pool stage ====
Legend
Advances to Cup
Advances to Plate

Pool A

Teams	Pld	W	D	L	PF	PA	+/−	Pts
Japan	3	3	0	0	81	14	+67	9
Sri Lanka	3	2	0	1	64	33	+31	7
Chinese Taipei	3	1	0	2	31	75	–44	5
China	3	0	0	3	29	83	–54	3

14 September 2018
13:58

Sri Lanka	31–0	China

HKFC

14 September 2018
14:20

Japan	27–0	Chinese Taipei

HKFC

14 September 2018
16:54

China	15–19	Chinese Taipei

HKFC

14 September 2018
17:16

Japan	21–0	Sri Lanka

HKFC

15 September 2018
11:28

Japan	33–14	China

HKFC

15 September 2018
11:50

Sri Lanka	33–12	Chinese Taipei

HKFC

Pool B

Teams	Pld	W	D	L	PF	PA	+/−	Pts
Hong Kong	3	3	0	0	155	7	+148	9
Philippines	3	2	0	1	45	59	–14	7
Malaysia	3	1	0	2	36	99	–63	5
South Korea	3	0	0	3	26	97	–71	3

14 September 2018
14:42

South Korea	7–12	Philippines

HKFC

14 September 2018
15:04

Hong Kong	54–0	Malaysia

HKFC

14 September 2018
17:38

Hong Kong	59–0	South Korea

HKFC

14 September 2018
18:00

Philippines	26–10	Malaysia

HKFC

15 September 2018
12:12

Hong Kong	42–7	Philippines

HKFC

15 September 2018
12:34

South Korea	19–26	Malaysia

HKFC

==== Knockout stage ====
Plate

Semi-finals
15 September – 14:24 – HKFC
China	28
Malaysia	24
15 September – 14:46 – HKFC
Chinese Taipei	40
South Korea	5

Plate Final
15 September – 17:02 – HKFC
China	15
Chinese Taipei	7
Seventh place
15 September – 16:40 – HKFC
Malaysia	14
South Korea	28

Cup

Semi-finals
15 September – 15:12 – HKFC
Japan	36
Philippines	5
15 September – 15:34 – HKFC
Sri Lanka	0
Hong Kong	31

Cup Final
15 September – 18:30 – HKFC
Japan	12
Hong Kong	0
Third place
15 September – 17:46 – HKFC
Philippines	12
Sri Lanka	40

=== South Korea ===
The men's trophy was held 29–30 September in Incheon. All times in Korea Standard Time (UTC+09:00).

==== Pool stage ====
Legend
Advances to Cup
Advances to Plate

Pool A

Teams	Pld	W	D	L	PF	PA	+/−	Pts
Japan	3	3	0	0	105	19	+86	9
China	3	2	0	1	57	45	+12	7
Philippines	3	1	0	2	31	60	–29	5
Malaysia	3	0	0	3	22	91	–69	3

29 September 2018
13:58

Sri Lanka	31–0	China

Namdong Asiad

29 September 2018
14:20

Japan	27–0	Chinese Taipei

Namdong Asiad

29 September 2018
16:54

China	15–19	Chinese Taipei

Namdong Asiad

29 September 2018
17:16

Japan	21–0	Sri Lanka

Namdong Asiad

30 September 2018
11:28

Japan	33–14	China

Namdong Asiad

30 September 2018
11:50

Sri Lanka	33–12	Chinese Taipei

Namdong Asiad

Pool B

Teams	Pld	W	D	L	PF	PA	+/−	Pts
Hong Kong	3	3	0	0	119	26	+93	9
South Korea	3	2	0	1	77	41	+36	7
Sri Lanka	3	1	0	2	61	65	–4	5
Chinese Taipei	3	0	0	3	24	149	–125	3

29 September 2018
14:42

South Korea	7–12	Philippines

Namdong Asiad

29 September 2018
15:04

Hong Kong	54–0	Malaysia

Namdong Asiad

29 September 2018
17:38

Hong Kong	59–0	South Korea

Namdong Asiad

29 September 2018
18:00

Philippines	26–10	Malaysia

Namdong Asiad

30 September 2018
12:12

Hong Kong	73–0	Chinese Taipei

Namdong Asiad

30 September 2018
12:34

Sri Lanka	14–22	South Korea

Namdong Asiad

==== Knockout stage ====
Plate

Semi-finals
30 September – 14:24 – Namdong Asiad
Malaysia	12
Sri Lanka	17
30 September – 14:46 – Namdong Asiad
Philippines	40
Chinese Taipei	5

Plate Final
30 September – 17:12 – Namdong Asiad
Sri Lanka	17
Philippines	19
Seventh place
30 September – 16:50 – Namdong Asiad
Malaysia	24
Chinese Taipei	29

Cup

Semi-finals
30 September – 15:22 – Namdong Asiad
Japan	33
South Korea	24
30 September – 15:44 – Namdong Asiad
China	0
Hong Kong	47

Cup Final
30 September – 18:40 – Namdong Asiad
Japan	28
Hong Kong	19
Third place
30 September – 17:56 – Namdong Asiad
South Korea	12
China	31

=== Sri Lanka ===
The tournament was held 13–14 October in Colombo. All times in Sri Lanka Standard Time (UTC+05:30).

==== Pool stage ====
Legend
Advances to Cup
Advances to Plate

Pool A

Teams	Pld	W	D	L	PF	PA	+/−	Pts
Japan	3	3	0	0	122	12	+110	9
Philippines	3	2	0	1	70	45	+25	7
Malaysia	3	1	0	2	43	95	−52	5
South Korea	3	0	0	3	15	98	−83	3

13 October 2018
14:58

South Korea	5−34	Philippines

Racecourse Stadium

13 October 2018
15:20

Japan	61−0	Malaysia

Racecourse Stadium

13 October 2018
18:16

Philippines	24−19	Malaysia

Racecourse Stadium

13 October 2018
18:38

Japan	40−0	South Korea

Racecourse Stadium

14 October 2018
11:28

Japan	21−12	Philippines

Racecourse Stadium

14 October 2018
11:50

South Korea	10−24	Malaysia

Racecourse Stadium

Pool B

Teams	Pld	W	D	L	PF	PA	+/−	Pts
Hong Kong	3	3	0	0	139	24	+115	9
Sri Lanka	3	2	0	1	74	33	+41	7
China	3	1	0	2	59	73	−14	5
Chinese Taipei	3	0	0	3	12	154	−142	3

13 October 2018
15:42

China	12−19	Sri Lanka

Racecourse Stadium

13 October 2018
16:04

Hong Kong	71−5	Chinese Taipei

Racecourse Stadium

13 October 2018
19:00

Hong Kong	47−7	China

Racecourse Stadium

13 October 2018
19:22

Sri Lanka	43−0	Chinese Taipei

Racecourse Stadium

14 October 2018
12:12

Hong Kong	21−12	Sri Lanka

Racecourse Stadium

14 October 2018
12:34

China	40−7	Chinese Taipei

Racecourse Stadium

==== Knockout stage ====
Plate

Semi-finals
14 October – 14:24 – Racecourse Stadium
South Korea	7
China	39
14 October – 14:46 – Racecourse Stadium
Malaysia	19
Chinese Taipei	12

Plate Final
14 October – 17:12 – Racecourse Stadium
China	24
Malaysia	21
Seventh place
14 October – 16:50 – Racecourse Stadium
South Korea	15
Chinese Taipei	12

Cup

Semi-finals
14 October – 15:22 – Racecourse Stadium
Japan	34
Sri Lanka	17
14 October – 15:44 – Racecourse Stadium
Philippines	12
Hong Kong	19

Cup Final
14 October – 18:50 – Racecourse Stadium
Japan	19
Hong Kong	5
Third place
14 October – 17:56 – Racecourse Stadium
Sri Lanka	7
Philippines	19

=== Final standings ===
Legend
Qualified to 2019 Hong Kong Sevens
Already in World Sevens Series
Relegated for 2019 Series

Rank	Team	Hong Kong	South Korea	Sri Lanka	Points
1	Japan	12	12	12	36
2	Hong Kong	10	10	10	30
3	Philippines	7	4	8	19
4	Sri Lanka	8	3	7	18
5	China	4	8	4	16
6	South Korea	2	7	2	11
7	Chinese Taipei	3	2	1	6
8	Malaysia	1	1	3	5

== See also ==
- 2018 Asia Rugby Women's Sevens Series
