= 2016 Asia Rugby Sevens Series =

8th edition of Asia's continental sevens tournament

- Hosts: India; UAE; Hong Kong; South Korea; Sri Lanka
- Date: 3 September - 16 October

Final positions
- Champions: Hong Kong
- Runners-up: Sri Lanka
- Third: South Korea

The 2016 Asia Rugby Sevens Series is the eighth edition of Asia's continental sevens tournament. It was played over three legs hosted in Hong Kong, South Korea, and Sri Lanka. The top two teams besides Japan qualifying for the 2017 Hong Kong Sevens for a chance to win a place as a World Rugby Sevens Series core team.

The size of the series has been reduced from twelve teams in 2015 to eight teams in 2016. The Asia Rugby Development Sevens Series, held over two legs in India and the United Arab Emirates, served as a qualifier, with the winner qualifying for the main series.

== Teams ==
Asia Rugby Development Sevens Series

- Bangladesh
- Chinese Taipei
- India
- Indonesia
- Iran
- Lebanon
- Nepal
- Pakistan
- Philippines
- Qatar
- Syria
- Thailand
- United Arab Emirates

Asia Rugby Sevens Series

- China
- Chinese Taipei
- Hong Kong
- Japan
- Malaysia
- Singapore
- South Korea
- Sri Lanka

== Development series ==
=== Chennai leg ===
All matches were held at Nehru Jawaharlal Stadium in Chennai, India

Key to colours in group tables
Teams that advance to Cup Semifinal
Teams that advance to Plate Semifinal

Pool A

Teams	Pld	W	D	L	PF	PA	+/−	Pts
Philippines	4	4	0	0	164	21	+143	12
United Arab Emirates	4	3	0	1	162	36	+126	10
India	4	2	0	2	102	81	+21	8
Syria	4	1	0	3	32	179	-147	6
Nepal	4	0	0	4	0	143	-143	4

Matches

20 February 2016

India	41-0	Nepal

20 February 2016

Philippines	63-0	Syria

20 February 2016

India	47-0	Syria

20 February 2016

United Arab Emirates	41-0	Nepal

20 February 2016

Nepal	0-27	Syria

20 February 2016

United Arab Emirates	14-24	Philippines

20 February 2016

United Arab Emirates	69-5	Syria

20 February 2016

Philippines	43-7	India

21 February 2016

Philippines	34-0	Nepal

21 February 2016

United Arab Emirates	38-7	India

Pool B

Teams	Pld	W	D	L	PF	PA	+/−	Pts
Thailand	4	4	0	0	94	35	+59	12
Chinese Taipei	4	3	0	1	132	38	+94	10
Lebanon	4	2	0	2	121	43	+78	8
Bangladesh	4	1	0	3	26	137	-113	6
Indonesia	4	0	0	4	0	118	-118	4

Matches

20 February 2016

Lebanon	47-0	Bangladesh

20 February 2016

Chinese Taipei	31-0	Indonesia

20 February 2016

Thailand	22-14	Bangladesh

20 February 2016

Lebanon	41-0	Indonesia

20 February 2016

Bangladesh	12-0	Indonesia

20 February 2016

Thailand	19-7	Chinese Taipei

20 February 2016

Thailand	34-0	Indonesia

20 February 2016

Chinese Taipei	24-19	Lebanon

21 February 2016

Chinese Taipei	70-0	Bangladesh

20 February 2016

Thailand	19-14	Lebanon

Knockout Stage

9th/10th Place Playoff

Final
21 February 2016
Nepal	12
Indonesia	39

Plate

Semi-finals
21 February 2016
India	31
Bangladesh	5
21 February 2016
Syria	0
Lebanon	52

Final
21 February 2016
India	7
Lebanon	19
Third place
21 February 2016
Bangladesh	26
Syria	24

Cup

Semi-finals
21 February 2016
Philippines	12
Chinese Taipei	31
21 February 2016
United Arab Emirates	10
Thailand	22

Final
21 February 2016
Chinese Taipei	36
Thailand	21
Third place
21 February 2016
Philippines	38
United Arab Emirates	21

=== Al Ain leg ===
All matches were held at Al Ain Amblers RFC in Al Ain, United Arab Emirates

First Round

Legend
Qualified to Pool D for second round
Qualified to Pool E for second round
Qualified to Pool F for second round

Pool A

Teams	Pld	W	D	L	PF	PA	+/−	Pts
Chinese Taipei	2	2	0	0	56	20	+36	6
India	2	1	0	1	38	35	+3	4
Qatar	2	0	0	2	27	66	-39	2

26 February 2016

India	38-7	Qatar

26 February 2016

Chinese Taipei	28-20	Qatar

26 February 2016

Chinese Taipei	28-0	India

Pool B

Teams	Pld	W	D	L	PF	PA	+/−	Pts
Thailand	2	2	0	0	64	14	+50	6
Lebanon	2	1	0	1	31	38	-7	4
Pakistan	2	0	0	2	7	50	-43	2

26 February 2016

Lebanon	17-7	Pakistan

26 February 2016

Thailand	33-0	Pakistan

26 February 2016

Thailand	31-14	Lebanon

Pool C

Teams	Pld	W	D	L	PF	PA	+/−	Pts
United Arab Emirates	2	2	0	0	45	26	+19	6
Philippines	2	1	0	1	47	38	+9	4
Iran	2	0	0	2	19	47	-28	2

26 February 2016

United Arab Emirates	19-7	Iran

26 February 2016

Philippines	28-12	Iran

26 February 2016

Philippines	19-26	United Arab Emirates

Second Round

Legend
Qualified to Cup Semifinals
Qualified to Plate Round-Robin
Qualified to Bowl Round-Robin

Pool D

Teams	Pld	W	D	L	PF	PA	+/−	Pts
Chinese Taipei	2	1	0	1	36	26	+10	4
United Arab Emirates	2	1	0	1	29	31	-2	4
Thailand	2	1	0	1	33	41	-8	4

26 February 2016

Chinese Taipei	19-5	United Arab Emirates

26 February 2016

Chinese Taipei	17-21	Thailand

27 February 2016

Thailand	12-24	United Arab Emirates

Pool E

Teams	Pld	W	D	L	PF	PA	+/−	Pts
Philippines	2	2	0	0	94	10	+84	6
India	2	1	0	1	14	66	-52	4
Lebanon	2	0	0	2	22	54	-32	2

26 February 2016

India	0-54	Philippines

26 February 2016

India	14-12	Lebanon

27 February 2016

Lebanon	10-40	Philippines

Pool F

Teams	Pld	W	D	L	PF	PA	+/−	Pts
Iran	2	2	0	0	44	22	+22	6
Qatar	2	1	0	1	45	25	+20	4
Pakistan	2	0	0	2	10	52	-42	2

26 February 2016

Qatar	17-20	Iran

26 February 2016

Qatar	28-5	Pakistan

27 February 2016

Pakistan	5-24	Iran

Final Round

Bowl

27 February 2016

Qatar	24-7	Pakistan

27 February 2016

Qatar	26-5	Pakistan

Plate

27 February 2016

India	24-15	Iran

27 February 2016

Lebanon	17-29	Iran

27 February 2016

India	19-14	Lebanon

Cup

Semi-finals
27 February 2016
Chinese Taipei	17
Philippines	12
27 February 2016
United Arab Emirates	38
Thailand	7

Final
27 February 2016
Chinese Taipei	24
United Arab Emirates	22
Third place
27 February 2016
Philippines	19
Thailand	15

=== Final standings ===
Legend
Promoted to the main series for 2016

Rank	Team	Chennai	Al Ain	Overall
1	Chinese Taipei	10	9	19
2	Philippines	8	7	15
2	Thailand	9	6	15
2	United Arab Emirates	7	8	15
5	India	5	5	10
6	Lebanon	6	3	9
7	Bangladesh	4	-	4
7	Iran	-	4	4
9	Syria	3	-	3
10	Indonesia	2	-	2
10	Qatar	-	2	2
12	Nepal	1	-	1
13	Pakistan	-	1	1

== Main series ==
=== Hong Kong ===
All matches will be held at the Hong Kong Football Club Stadium. All times are Hong Kong Time(UTC+8)

Event	Winners	Score	Finalists	Semifinalists
Cup	Hong Kong	22–17	Sri Lanka	South Korea, China
Plate	Japan	7–0	Singapore	Chinese Taipei, Malaysia

Pool A

Teams	Pld	W	D	L	PF	PA	+/−	Pts
China	3	3	0	0	60	27	+33	9
South Korea	3	2	0	1	82	24	+58	7
Japan	3	1	0	2	60	31	+29	5
Singapore	3	0	0	3	0	120	-120	3

Matches

2 September 2016
13:28

Japan	10-12	China

2 September 2016
13:50

South Korea	46-0	Singapore

2 September 2016
16:24

Japan	45-0	Singapore

2 September 2016
16:46

South Korea	17-19	China

2 September 2016
19:20

China	29-0	Singapore

2 September 2016
19:42

Japan	5-19	South Korea

Pool B

Teams	Pld	W	D	L	PF	PA	+/−	Pts
Hong Kong	3	3	0	0	105	0	+105	9
Sri Lanka	3	2	0	1	83	55	28	7
Malaysia	3	1	0	2	35	83	-48	5
Chinese Taipei	3	0	0	3	19	104	-85	3

Matches

2 September 2016
14:12

Hong Kong	36-0	Malaysia

2 September 2016
14:34

Sri Lanka	43-12	Chinese Taipei

2 September 2016
17:08

Hong Kong	47-0	Chinese Taipei

2 September 2016
17:30

Sri Lanka	40-21	Malaysia

2 September 2016
20:04

Hong Kong	22-0	Sri Lanka

2 September 2016
20:26

Malaysia	14-7	Chinese Taipei

Plate Semifinals

Semi-finals
3 September 2016 - 12:28
Japan	10
Chinese Taipei	5
3 September 2016 - 12:50
Singapore	14
Malaysia	12

Final
3 September 2016 - 15:24
Japan	7
Singapore	0
Third place
3 September 2016 - 15:02
Chinese Taipei	22
Malaysia	7

Cup Semifinals

Semi-finals
3 September 2016 - 13:12
China	17
Sri Lanka	29
3 September 2016 - 13:34
South Korea	14
Hong Kong	28

Final
3 September 2016 - 16:30
Sri Lanka	17
Hong Kong	22
Third place
3 September - 15:46
China	14
South Korea	33

=== Korea ===
All Matches will be held at Namdong Asiad Rugby Stadium. All times are Korea Standard Time (UTC+9)

Event	Winners	Score	Finalists	Semifinalists
Cup	Hong Kong	36–0	Sri Lanka	South Korea; China
Plate	Malaysia	21–17	Chinese Taipei	Japan; Singapore

Pool A

Teams	Pld	W	D	L	PF	PA	+/−	Pts
South Korea	3	3	0	0	109	38	+71	9
Hong Kong	3	2	0	1	125	33	+92	7
Chinese Taipei	3	1	0	2	31	104	-73	5
Japan	3	0	0	3	17	107	-90	3

Matches

24 September 2016
13:12

Hong Kong	47-5	Chinese Taipei

24 September 2016
13:34

South Korea	36-5	Japan

24 September 2016
16:08

Hong Kong	57-0	Japan

24 September 2016
16:30

South Korea	45-12	Chinese Taipei

24 September 2016
19:04

Hong Kong	21-28	South Korea

24 September 2016
19:26

Japan	12-14	Chinese Taipei

Pool B

Teams	Pld	W	D	L	PF	PA	+/−	Pts
China	3	3	0	0	98	21	+77	9
Sri Lanka	3	2	0	1	89	36	+53	7
Malaysia	3	1	0	2	17	77	-60	5
Singapore	3	0	0	3	12	82	-70	3

Matches

24 September 2016
12:28

Sri Lanka	29-5	Singapore

24 September 2016
12:50

China	29-0	Malaysia

24 September 2016
15:24

Sri Lanka	41-5	Malaysia

24 September 2016
15:46

China	43-0	Singapore

24 September 2016
18:20

Singapore	7-12	Malaysia

24 September 2016
18:42

Sri Lanka	21-26	China

Plate Semifinals

Semi-finals
25 September 2016 - 12:13
Chinese Taipei	41
Singapore	17
25 September 2016 - 12:35
Japan	10
Malaysia	20

Final
25 September 2016 - 15:17
Chinese Taipei	17
Malaysia	21
Third place
25 September 2016 - 14:55
Singapore	21
Japan	24

Cup Semifinals

Semi-finals
25 September 2016 - 13:05
South Korea	10
Sri Lanka	26
25 September 2016 - 13:27
China	0
Hong Kong	29

Final
25 September 2016 - 16:23
Sri Lanka	0
Hong Kong	36
Third place
25 September - 15:39
South Korea	29
China	12

=== Colombo ===
All matches will be held at Race Course International Rugby Stadium. All times are Sri Lanka Standard Time (UTC+5:30)

Event	Winners	Score	Finalists	Semifinalists
Cup	Hong Kong	24 – 19	South Korea	China; Sri Lanka
Plate	Malaysia	19 – 14	Japan	Chinese Taipei; Singapore

Pool A

Teams	Pld	W	D	L	PF	PA	+/−	Pts
Hong Kong	3	2	0	1	71	46	+25	7
South Korea	3	2	0	1	89	54	+35	7
Japan	3	1	0	2	43	90	-47	5
Malaysia	3	1	0	2	47	60	-13	5

Matches

15 October 2016
12:28

Hong Kong	31-12	Japan

15 October 2016
12:50

South Korea	29-14	Malaysia

15 October 2016
15:24

Hong Kong	14-19	Malaysia

15 October 2016
15:46

South Korea	45-14	Japan

15 October 2016
18:20

Malaysia	14-17	Japan

15 October 2016
18:42

Hong Kong	26-15	South Korea

Pool B

Teams	Pld	W	D	L	PF	PA	+/−	Pts
China	3	3	0	0	86	19	+67	9
Sri Lanka	3	2	0	1	106	31	+75	7
Singapore	3	1	0	2	12	100	-88	5
Chinese Taipei	3	0	0	3	7	61	-54	3

Matches

15 October 2016
13:12

Sri Lanka	26-7	Chinese Taipei

15 October 2016
13:34

China	34-5	Singapore

15 October 2016
16:08

Sri Lanka	66-0	Singapore

15 October 2016
16:30

China	28-0	Chinese Taipei

15 October 2016
19:04

Sri Lanka	14-24	China

15 October 2016
19:26

Chinese Taipei	0-7	Singapore

Plate Semifinals

Semi-finals
16 October 2016 - 14:13
Japan	26
Chinese Taipei	5
16 October 2016 - 14:35
Malaysia	24
Singapore	12

Final
16 October 2016 - 17:17
Japan	14
Malaysia	19
Third place
25 September 2016 - 16:55
Chinese Taipei	22
Singapore	17

Cup Semifinals

Semi-finals
16 October 2016 - 15:05
Hong Kong	19
Sri Lanka	7
16 October 2016 - 15:27
South Korea	19
China	14

Final
16 October 2016 - 17:39
Hong Kong	24
South Korea	19
Third place
16 October 2016 - 18:23
Sri Lanka	21
China	22

=== Final standings ===
Legend
Winner and qualified to 2017 Hong Kong Sevens
Qualified to 2017 Hong Kong Sevens
Relegated for 2017 Series

Rank	Team	Hong Kong	Korea	Sri Lanka	Points
1	Hong Kong	12	12	12	36
2	Sri Lanka	10	10	7	27
3	South Korea	8	8	10	26
4	China	7	7	8	22
5	Japan	5	2	4	11
6	Malaysia	1	5	5	11
7	Chinese Taipei	2	4	2	8
8	Singapore	4	1	1	6
