= Rugby sevens at the 2017 SEA Games – Men's tournament =

Rugby Sevens – Men's tournament at the 2017 SEA Games
- Venue: Petaling Jaya Stadium
- Dates: 19 – 20 August 2017
- Nations: 6

Medalists
gold medal	Malaysia (MAS)
silver medal	Singapore (SGP)
bronze medal	Thailand (THA)

The men's rugby sevens tournament at the 2017 Southeast Asian Games was held from 19 to 20 August in Malaysia. In this tournament, 6 Southeast Asian teams will play in the men's competition.

All matches will be played at Petaling Jaya Stadium in Petaling Jaya.

== Competition schedule ==
The following was the competition schedule for the men's rugby sevens competitions:

G	Group stage	PO	5th place play-off	B	3rd place play-off	F	Final

Sat 19	Sun 20			
G	G	PO	B	F

== Participating nations ==
The following six teams participated for the men's competition.

- Cambodia (CAM)
- Indonesia (INA)
- Malaysia (MAS)
- Philippines (PHI)
- Singapore (SGP)
- Thailand (THA)

== Draw ==
There are no official draw since only 6 teams participating in this competition. All teams are automatically drawn to one group.

== Results ==
- All times are Malaysia Standard Time (UTC+8).

=== Group stage ===
Pos	Team	Pld	W	D	L	PF	PA	PD	Pts	Final Result
1	Malaysia (H)	5	4	0	1	169	36	+133	13	Advanced to Gold medal match
2	Singapore	5	4	0	1	174	43	+131	13	Advanced to Gold medal match
3	Thailand	5	4	0	1	159	47	+112	13	Advanced to Bronze medal match
4	Philippines	5	2	0	3	129	90	+39	9	Advanced to Bronze medal match
5	Indonesia	5	1	0	4	52	231	−179	7	Advanced to 5th place playoff match
6	Cambodia	5	0	0	5	14	250	−236	5	Advanced to 5th place playoff match

Source: Schedule
(H) Hosts

19 August 2017
10:44

Malaysia	51–0	Cambodia

19 August 2017
11:06

Philippines	47–7	Indonesia

19 August 2017
11:28

Thailand	19–21	Singapore

19 August 2017
13:22

Philippines	47–7	Cambodia

19 August 2017
13:44

Malaysia	12–10	Singapore

19 August 2017
14:06

Thailand	50–5	Indonesia

19 August 2017
16:00

Malaysia	24–14	Philippines

19 August 2017
16:22

Thailand	47–0	Cambodia

19 August 2017
16:44

Singapore	52–5	Indonesia

20 August 2017
10:00

Indonesia	35–7	Cambodia

20 August 2017
10:22

Malaysia	7–12	Thailand

20 August 2017
10:44

Philippines	7–21	Singapore

20 August 2017
12:38

Malaysia	75–0	Indonesia

20 August 2017
13:00

Singapore	70–0	Cambodia

20 August 2017
13:22

Philippines	14–31	Thailand

=== Final round ===
5th place playoff

20 August 2017
15:38

Indonesia	12–17	Cambodia

Bronze medal match

20 August 2017
16:00

Thailand	26–7	Philippines

Gold medal match

20 August 2017
17:06

Malaysia	22–7	Singapore

== See also ==
- Women's tournament
