= 2025 Asia Rugby Sevens Series =

Rugby sevens competition

- Hosts: China; Sri Lanka
- Date: 20 September–19 October 2025
- Nations: 12

Final positions
- Champions: Hong Kong
- Runners-up: Japan
- Third: China; Sri Lanka

The 2025 Asia Rugby Sevens Series is the sixteenth edition of the series. It is played over two legs in China and Sri Lanka.

== Teams ==
Twelve teams featured in the series, expanded from eight in previous editions:

- China
- Hong Kong
- Japan
- Malaysia
- Singapore
- South Korea
- Thailand
- United Arab Emirates
- Sri Lanka
- Philippines
- Uzbekistan
- Chinese Taipei

== Tour venues ==
The official schedule for the 2025 Asia Rugby Sevens Series is:

Leg	Stadium	City	Dates	Winner
China	Hangzhou Normal University	Hangzhou	20–21 September 2025	Hong Kong
Sri Lanka	Colombo Racecourse	Colombo	18–19 October 2025	Hong Kong

== Standings ==
2025 Asia Rugby Sevens Series
Pos	Event Team	Hangzhou	Colombo	Points total
1	Hong Kong	12	12	24
2	Japan	11	11	22
3	China	10	9	19
3	Sri Lanka	9	10	19
5	United Arab Emirates	8	7	15
6	Malaysia	7	4	11
7	Thailand	2	8	10
8	Singapore	3	6	9
9	South Korea	6	2	8
10	Uzbekistan	4	3	7
11	Philippines	1	5	6
11	Chinese Taipei	5	1	6

Legend
Blue fill	Entry to 2026 SVNS 3
