= 1976 Hong Kong Sevens =

International rugby sevens tournament

- Host nation: Hong Kong
- Date: 28 March 1976

Cup
- Champion: New Zealand
- Runner-up: Australia

Plate
- Winner: Hong Kong
- Runner-up: Tonga

Tournament details
- Matches played: 22

The 1976 Hong Kong Sevens was the inaugural edition of the Hong Kong Sevens series held on 28 March 1976 at the Hong Kong Football Club Stadium in Happy Valley, Hong Kong. It was called Rothmans-Cathay Pacific International Seven-a-side Championship at that time and was organized by Hong Kong Rugby Football Union.

The draw was conducted on 23 February 1976 at The Excelsior Hotel.

Twelves teams are divided into four groups of three teams. The teams play a round-robin in their group in the first round, the winners advance to the semifinal and the other eight teams enter the plate knockout stage.

== Teams ==
- Pool A: Australia, South Korea, Tonga
- Pool B: Hong Kong, Fiji, Malaysia
- Pool C: Singapore, Sri Lanka, Japan
- Pool D: Thailand, New Zealand, Indonesia

== Squad ==
- Sri Lanka: Indrajit Coomaraswamy, Maiya Gunasekera, Mohan Balasuriya, L. Tonnekoon, R. Rodrigo, S. Ching, G. Gunadasa, J. de Jong, one unknown.
- Australia: Streeter, Hasell, Thomas, Gelling, Weekes, Bullsfield,
- South Korea: Chong In Lee
- Tonga: Sami Latu, Malakai, Sutia, Polutele, Kainiu
- Fiji: Tuisese, Raluni, Cavuilati, Rauto
- Hong Kong: Dunkan, Ogolter, Lloyd, Kent, Cunningham
- Japan: Matsuo, Kumagayi, Fugowara, Nishizuma
- Singapore: Teo Han Chua, Crotty
- New Zealand: Purdon, Cartwright, Hales, Scott, McPhale, Davies, Hurst, Thomson

== Pool stage ==
Key to colors in group tables
Teams that advanced to the Cup semifinals
Teams that advanced to the Plate quarterfinals

=== Pool A ===
Pos	Team	Pld	W	D	L	PF	PA	PD	Pts
1	Australia	2	2	0	0	38	14	+24	6
2	Tonga	2	1	0	1	38	18	+20	4
3	South Korea	2	0	0	2	8	52	−44	2

28 March 1976
10:30

Australia	24–4	South Korea

Hong Kong Football Club Stadium, Hong Kong

28 March 1976
11:50

South Korea	4–28	Tonga

Hong Kong Football Club Stadium, Hong Kong

28 March 1976
13:10

Tonga	10–14	Australia

Hong Kong Football Club Stadium, Hong Kong

Source World Rugby

=== Pool B ===
Pos	Team	Pld	W	D	L	PF	PA	PD	Pts
1	Fiji	2	2	0	0	56	4	+52	6
2	Hong Kong	2	1	0	1	40	20	+20	4
3	Malaysia	2	0	0	2	0	72	−72	2

28 March 1976
10:50

Fiji	20–4	Hong Kong

Hong Kong Football Club Stadium, Hong Kong

28 March 1976
12:10

Fiji	36–0 (36-10 in Japan Rugby)	Malaysia

Hong Kong Football Club Stadium, Hong Kong

28 March 1976
13:30

Hong Kong	36–0	Malaysia

Hong Kong Football Club Stadium, Hong Kong

Source World Rugby

=== Pool C ===
Pos	Team	Pld	W	D	L	PF	PA	PD	Pts
1	Japan	2	2	0	0	38	14	+24	6
2	Singapore	2	1	0	1	38	18	+20	4
3	Sri Lanka	2	0	0	2	8	52	−44	2

28 March 1976
11:10

Singapore	22–0	Sri Lanka

Hong Kong Football Club Stadium, Hong Kong

28 March 1976
12:30

Japan	32–0	Sri Lanka

Hong Kong Football Club Stadium, Hong Kong

28 March 1976
13:50

Japan	22-6 (20-6 in Japan Rugby, Canberra Times, New Nations)	Singapore

Hong Kong Football Club Stadium, Hong Kong

Source World Rugby

=== Pool D ===
Pos	Team	Pld	W	D	L	PF	PA	PD	Pts
1	New Zealand	2	2	0	0	38	14	+24	6
2	Indonesia	2	1	0	1	38	18	+20	4
3	Thailand	2	0	0	2	8	52	−44	2

28 March 1976
11:30

New Zealand	24–4	Thailand

Hong Kong Football Club Stadium, Hong Kong

28 March 1976
12:50

New Zealand	34–3	Indonesia

Hong Kong Football Club Stadium, Hong Kong

28 March 1976
14:10

Indonesia	16-4	Thailand

Hong Kong Football Club Stadium, Hong Kong

Source World Rugby

== Knockout stage ==
=== Plate ===
Quarter-finals
28 March – Hong Kong Stadium
Hong Kong	18
South Korea	8
28 March – Hong Kong Stadium
Singapore	14
Thailand	10
28 March – Hong Kong Stadium
Tonga	20
Malaysia	0
28 March – Hong Kong Stadium
Sri Lanka	14
Indonesia	0

Semi-finals
28 March – Hong Kong Stadium
Hong Kong	20
Singapore	10
28 March – Hong Kong Stadium
Tonga	16
Sri Lanka	0

Final
28 March – Hong Kong Stadium
Hong Kong	19
Tonga	16

Source: World Rugby

=== Main ===
Semi-finals
28 March – Hong Kong Football Club Stadium
New Zealand	18
Japan	0
28 March – Hong Kong Football Club Stadium
Australia	14
Fiji	10

Final
28 March – Hong Kong Football Club Stadium
New Zealand	24
Australia	8

Source: World Rugby
