= 2021 Asia Rugby Sevens Series Trophy =

Rugby Sevens qualification tournament

- Host nation: Qatar
- Date: 8–9 October 2021

Cup
- Champion: United Arab Emirates
- Runner-up: Iran
- Third: Qatar

Tournament details
- Matches played: 14
- Most points: Boris Finck (45 points)
- Most tries: Ali Yaghoti (7 tries)

The 2021 Asia Rugby Sevens Series Trophy also known as the 2021 Asia Rugby Sevens Series qualification or the 2021 West Asia Sevens was the qualification tournament for the 2021 Asia Rugby Sevens Series, the winner of which would qualify for the event as the eighth team. The 2021 Asia Rugby Sevens Series was the first Asian Sevens event to be held since 2019. And was itself a qualification event for the 2022 Rugby World Cup Sevens.

The tournament was played between five teams (Qatar, United Arab Emirates, Iran, Lebanon and debutants Palestine). The event was held in Doha, Qatar over two days (8, 9 October). The winners of the tournament were the United Arab Emirates.

== Pool stage ==
All the tournament results were tallied via Asia Rugby:

=== Round-robin ===
Team	Pld	W	D	L	PF	PA	PD	Pts	Qualification
United Arab Emirates	4	3	0	1	133	32	+101	10	Advance to Semi-finals
Qatar	4	3	0	1	117	29	+88	10	Advance to Semi-finals
Iran	4	3	0	1	118	52	+66	10	Advance to Semi-finals
Lebanon	4	1	0	3	94	102	–8	6	Advance to Semi-finals
Palestine	4	0	0	4	0	247	–247	4	

==== Round 1 ====
8 October
16:40 AST (UTC+3)

Palestine	0–58	Qatar
	Report

Doha

8 October
17:00 AST (UTC+3)

United Arab Emirates	26–0	Iran
	Report

Doha

==== Round 2 ====
8 October
18:00 AST (UTC+3)

Palestine	0–68	Lebanon
	Report

Doha

8 October
18:20 AST (UTC+3)

Qatar	25–5	United Arab Emirates
	Report

Doha

==== Round 3 ====
8 October
19:20 AST (UTC+3)

Palestine	0–59	Iran
	Report

Doha

8 October
19:40 AST (UTC+3)

Qatar	22–5	Lebanon
	Report

Doha

==== Round 4 ====
9 October
16:00 AST (UTC+3)

Palestine	0–62	United Arab Emirates
	Report

Doha

9 October
16:20 AST (UTC+3)

Iran	40–14	Lebanon
	Report

Doha

==== Round 5 ====
9 October
17:20 AST (UTC+3)

United Arab Emirates	40–7	Lebanon
	Report

Doha

9 October
17:40 AST (UTC+3)

Qatar	12–19	Iran
	Report

Doha

== Knockout stage ==
=== Playoffs ===
Semi-finals
9 October – Doha
United Arab Emirates	64
Lebanon	7
9 October – Doha
Qatar	22
Iran	24

Final
9 October – Doha
United Arab Emirates	38
Iran	14
Third place
9 October – Doha
Lebanon	10
Qatar	36

Matches

Semi-finals

9 October	United Arab Emirates	64–7	Lebanon	Doha
18:40 AST (UTC+3)		Report

9 October	Qatar	22–24	Iran	Doha
19:00 AST (UTC+3)		Report

Third place

9 October	Lebanon	10–36	Qatar	Doha
19:00 AST (UTC+3)		Report

Final

9 October	United Arab Emirates	38–14	Iran	Doha
20:20 AST (UTC+3)		Report
