= 2016 Colombo Sevens =

Final leg of the 2016 Asian Seven Series

- Host nation: Sri Lanka
- Date: 15–16 October 2015

Cup
- Champion: Hong Kong
- Runner-up: South Korea
- Third: China

Plate
- Winner: Malaysia
- Runner-up: Japan

Tournament details
- Matches played: 20
- Tries scored: 119 (average 5.95 per match)
- Most points: (Hong Kong) Rimene, Benjamin (39)
- Most tries: (Sri Lanka) Dharmapala, Richard (6)

The 2016 Colombo Sevens was the third and final leg of the Asian Sevens Series for the year. A total of 20 matches were played across the tournament, which was held between 15 and 16 October 2016 at the Colombo International Rugby Stadium.

Hong Kong had their third straight tournament win in the series, defeating South Korea 24-19 in the Cup final. The victory secured Hong Kong the overall series title and a place in the international qualifier for the 2017 Hong Kong Sevens, which is part of the World Rugby Sevens Series. China defeated Sri Lanka 22-21 in the third/fourth place playoff; however the home side secured enough overall points in the series to finish second and also secure a place in the international qualifier at the 2017 Hong Kong Sevens. In the Plate final Malaysia defeated Japan 19-14. The leading points scorer for the tournament was Benjamin Rimene from Hong Kong with 39 points (comprising three tries and twelve conversions) closely followed by Malaysia's Azwan Mat Zizi on 38 points (four tries and 9 conversions). The top try scorer was Richard Dharmapala from Sri Lanka with six tries.

== Pool Stage ==
=== Pool A ===
Pool A featured the national sevens teams from Hong Kong, South Korea, Japan, and Malaysia, with matches taking place on 15 October 2016.

Hong Kong opened with a 31–12 victory over Japan, and South Korea followed with a 29–14 win against Malaysia. In the next round, Malaysia upset Hong Kong 19–14, South Korea defeated Japan 45–14, and Malaysia lost to Japan 17–14. The pool matches concluded with Hong Kong defeating South Korea 26–15.

Hong Kong and South Korea, the top two teams, advanced to the Cup semifinals, with Hong Kong seeded first.

Teams	Pld	W	D	L	PF	PA	+/−	Pts
Hong Kong	3	2	0	1	71	46	+25	7
South Korea	3	2	0	1	89	54	+35	7
Japan	3	1	0	2	43	90	-47	5
Malaysia	3	1	0	2	47	60	-13	5

15 October 2016
12:28

Hong Kong	31-12	Japan

15 October 2016
12:50

South Korea	29-14	Malaysia

15 October 2016
15:24

Hong Kong	14-19	Malaysia

15 October 2016
15:46

South Korea	45-14	Japan

15 October 2016
18:20

Malaysia	14-17	Japan

15 October 2016
18:42

Hong Kong	26-15	South Korea

=== Pool B ===
Pool B featured four teams: China, Sri Lanka, Singapore, and Chinese Taipei, with all matches played on 15 October 2016.

The opening matches saw Sri Lanka defeat Chinese Taipei 26–7, with China secured a 34–5 victory over Singapore. Later in the afternoon, Sri Lanka beat Singapore 66–0, scoring ten tries, while China won against Chinese Taipei 28–0. In the evening China defeated Sri Lanka 24–14, clinching the top spot, and Singapore beat Chinese Taipei 7–0.

China finished first and Sri Lanka second, both advancing to the Cup semifinals, while Singapore and Chinese Taipei proceeded to the Plate competition.

Teams	Pld	W	D	L	PF	PA	+/−	Pts
China	3	3	0	0	86	19	+67	9
Sri Lanka	3	2	0	1	106	31	+75	7
Singapore	3	1	0	2	12	100	-88	5
Chinese Taipei	3	0	0	3	7	61	-54	3

15 October 2016
13:12

Sri Lanka	26-7	Chinese Taipei

15 October 2016
13:34

China	34-5	Singapore

15 October 2016
16:08

Sri Lanka	66-0	Singapore

15 October 2016
16:30

China	28-0	Chinese Taipei

15 October 2016
19:04

Sri Lanka	14-24	China

15 October 2016
19:26

Chinese Taipei	0-7	Singapore

== Finals ==
=== Plate ===
The Plate competition served as the consolation bracket for teams eliminated in the Cup quarterfinals, and consisted of the third- and fourth-placed teams from each pool.

The Plate semifinals were held on 16 October 2016, Japan defeated Chinese Taipei 26–5, and Malaysia overcame Singapore 24–12. The Plate final, saw Malaysia win over Japan 19–14 to claim the title. In the third-place match, Chinese Taipei won over Singapore 22–17, securing seventh overall in the tournament standings.

Semi-finals
16 October 2016 - 14:13
Japan	26
Chinese Taipei	5
16 October 2016 - 14:35
Malaysia	24
Singapore	12

Final
16 October 2016 - 17:17
Japan	14
Malaysia	19
Third place
25 September 2016 - 16:55
Chinese Taipei	22
Singapore	17

=== Cup ===
The Cup competition featured the top four teams advancing from the pool stage.

In the first semifinal held on 16 October 2016, Hong Kong defeated Sri Lanka 19–7, and in the second semifinal South Korea won over China 19–14.

Hong Kong claimed the Cup title in the final overcoming South Korea 24–19. In the third-place match China narrowly defeated Sri Lanka 22–21.

Semi-finals
16 October 2016 - 15:05
Hong Kong	19
Sri Lanka	7
16 October 2016 - 15:27
South Korea	19
China	14

Final
16 October 2016 - 17:39
Hong Kong	24
South Korea	19
Third place
16 October 2016 - 18:23
Sri Lanka	21
China	22

== Standings ==
Pos.	Country	Points
1	Hong Kong	12
2	South Korea	11
3	China	10
4	Sri Lanka	9
5	Malaysia	8
6	Japan	7
7	Chinese Taipei	6
8	Singapore	5

Hong Kong's victory in the Colombo Sevens secured their third consecutive leg victory in the 2016 Asia Rugby Sevens Series, clinching the overall title with a total of 36 points, the first series sweep since the competition's inception in 2009.

Sri Lanka, finishing second in the series with 27 points, earned qualification alongside Hong Kong for the 2017 Hong Kong Sevens qualifier. South Korea placed third overall with 26 points, and China fourth with 22 points.
