= 2016 Korean Sevens =

2016 Hong Kong Asian Sevens
- Host nation: South Korea
- Date: 24–25 September 2016

Cup
- Champion: Hong Kong
- Runner-up: Sri Lanka
- Third: South Korea

Plate
- Winner: Malaysia
- Runner-up: Chinese Taipei

Tournament details
- Matches played: 20

The 2016 Korean Sevens was the second leg of the Asian Rugby Sevens Series for the year. It was the first time the Korean Sevens tournament was included in the series. The event was held at Incheon in the Namdong Asiad Rugby Stadium

Hong Kong won the second leg of the series after they defeated Sri Lanka 36–0 to open up a four-point lead heading into the final round at Colombo.

== Pool Stage ==
=== Pool A ===
Teams	Pld	W	D	L	PF	PA	+/−	Pts
South Korea	3	3	0	0	109	38	+71	9
Hong Kong	3	2	0	1	125	33	+92	7
Chinese Taipei	3	1	0	2	31	104	-73	5
Japan	3	0	0	3	17	107	-90	3

24 September 2016
13:12

Hong Kong	47-5	Chinese Taipei

24 September 2016
13:34

South Korea	36-5	Japan

24 September 2016
16:08

Hong Kong	57-0	Japan

24 September 2016
16:30

South Korea	45-12	Chinese Taipei

24 September 2016
19:04

Hong Kong	21-28	South Korea

24 September 2016
19:26

Japan	12-14	Chinese Taipei

=== Pool B ===
Teams	Pld	W	D	L	PF	PA	+/−	Pts
China	3	3	0	0	98	21	+77	9
Sri Lanka	3	2	0	1	89	36	+53	7
Malaysia	3	1	0	2	17	77	-60	5
Singapore	3	0	0	3	12	82	-70	3

24 September 2016
12:28

Sri Lanka	29-5	Singapore

24 September 2016
12:50

China	29-0	Malaysia

24 September 2016
15:24

Sri Lanka	41-5	Malaysia

24 September 2016
15:46

China	43-0	Singapore

24 September 2016
18:20

Singapore	7-12	Malaysia

24 September 2016
18:42

Sri Lanka	21-26	China

== Knockout stage ==
=== Plate ===
Semi-finals
25 September 2016 - 12:13
Chinese Taipei	41
Singapore	17
25 September 2016 - 12:35
Japan	10
Malaysia	20

Final
25 September 2016 - 15:17
Chinese Taipei	17
Malaysia	21
Third place
25 September 2016 - 14:55
Singapore	21
Japan	24

=== Cup ===
Semi-finals
25 September 2016 - 13:05
South Korea	10
Sri Lanka	26
25 September 2016 - 13:27
China	0
Hong Kong	29

Final
25 September 2016 - 16:23
Sri Lanka	0
Hong Kong	36
Third place
25 September - 15:39
South Korea	29
China	12
