= 2016 Hong Kong Asian Sevens =

- Host nation: Hong Kong
- Date: 2–3 September 2016

Cup
- Champion: Hong Kong
- Runner-up: Sri Lanka
- Third: South Korea

Plate
- Winner: Japan
- Runner-up: Singapore

Tournament details
- Matches played: 20

The 2016 Hong Kong Asian Sevens was the first leg of the Asian Rugby Sevens Series for the year. It was held at the Hong Kong Football Club Stadium

Hong Kong won the opening leg of the series after they defeated Sri Lanka 22–17 to lead the series.

== Pool Stage ==
=== Pool A ===
Teams	Pld	W	D	L	PF	PA	+/−	Pts
China	3	3	0	0	60	27	+33	9
South Korea	3	2	0	1	82	24	+58	7
Japan	3	1	0	2	60	31	+29	5
Singapore	3	0	0	3	0	120	-120	3

2 September 2016
13:28

Japan	10-12	China

2 September 2016
13:50

South Korea	46-0	Singapore

2 September 2016
16:24

Japan	45-0	Singapore

2 September 2016
16:46

South Korea	17-19	China

2 September 2016
19:20

China	29-0	Singapore

2 September 2016
19:42

Japan	5-19	South Korea

=== Pool B ===
Teams	Pld	W	D	L	PF	PA	+/−	Pts
Hong Kong	3	3	0	0	105	0	+105	9
Sri Lanka	3	2	0	1	83	55	28	7
Malaysia	3	1	0	2	35	83	-48	5
Chinese Taipei	3	0	0	3	19	104	-85	3

2 September 2016
14:12

Hong Kong	36-0	Malaysia

2 September 2016
14:34

Sri Lanka	43-12	Chinese Taipei

2 September 2016
17:08

Hong Kong	47-0	Chinese Taipei

2 September 2016
17:30

Sri Lanka	40-21	Malaysia

2 September 2016
20:04

Hong Kong	22-0	Sri Lanka

2 September 2016
20:26

Malaysia	14-7	Chinese Taipei

== Knockout stage ==
=== Plate ===
Semi-finals
3 September 2016 - 12:28
Japan	10
Chinese Taipei	5
3 September 2016 - 12:50
Singapore	14
Malaysia	12

Final
3 September 2016 - 15:24
Japan	7
Singapore	0
Third place
3 September 2016 - 15:02
Chinese Taipei	22
Malaysia	7

=== Cup ===
Semi-finals
3 September 2016 - 13:12
China	17
Sri Lanka	29
3 September 2016 - 13:34
South Korea	14
Hong Kong	28

Final
3 September 2016 - 16:30
Sri Lanka	17
Hong Kong	22
Third place
3 September - 15:46
China	14
South Korea	33
