= 2019 Asia Rugby Sevens Series =

- Hosts: Indonesia (Trophy); South Korea; China; Sri Lanka
- Date: 31 August – 29 September

Final positions
- Champions: Japan
- Runners-up: Hong Kong
- Third: China

The 2019 Asia Rugby Sevens Series was the eleventh edition of Asia's continental sevens circuit. The lower-tier Trophy tournament, hosted in Indonesia, served as a qualifier, with the top team qualifying for the main series hosted in South Korea, China, and Sri Lanka.

== Teams ==
Asia Rugby Sevens Trophy

- Afghanistan
- Bangladesh
- Brunei
- Indonesia
- Jordan
- Kazakhstan
- Laos
- Singapore
- Thailand
- Uzbekistan
- Malaysia (Relegated from 2018 Asia Rugby Sevens Series)

Asia Rugby Sevens Series

- China
- Chinese Taipei
- Hong Kong
- Japan
- Philippines
- South Korea
- Sri Lanka
- United Arab Emirates (Promoted from 2018 Asia Rugby Sevens Trophy)

== Schedule ==
The official schedule for the 2019 Asia Rugby Sevens Series was:

2019 Sevens Series schedule
Leg	Stadium	City	Dates	Winner
Korea	Incheon Namdong Asiad Rugby Field	Incheon	31 August – 1 September 2019	Japan
China	Huizhou Olympic Stadium	Huizhou	14–15 September 2019	Hong Kong
Sri Lanka	Colombo Racecourse Stadium	Colombo	28–29 September 2019	Japan

== Trophy ==
The men's trophy event was held on 10–11 August at the Gelora Bung Karno Sports Complex in Jakarta, Indonesia.

=== Placings ===
Place	Team	Qualification
1	Malaysia	Promoted to the main Asia Rugby Sevens Series for 2020
2	Singapore	
3	Thailand	
4	Mongolia	
5	India	
6	Indonesia	
7	Afghanistan	
8	Laos	
9	Uzbekistan	
10	Bangladesh	
11	Brunei	

=== Pool stage ===
==== Pool A ====
Team	P	W	D	L	PF	PA	PD	Pts	Qualification
Mongolia	2	2	0	0	38	12	+26	6	Advance to Cup playoffs
Indonesia	2	1	0	1	47	24	+23	4	5th–8th bracket
Uzbekistan	2	0	0	2	5	54	-49	2	9th place

10 August

Uzbekistan	0-19	Mongolia

10 August

Indonesia	12-19	Mongolia

10 August

Indonesia	35-5	Uzbekistan

==== Pool B ====
Team	P	W	D	L	PF	PA	PD	Pts	Qualification
Thailand	2	2	0	0	48	10	+38	6	Advance to Cup playoffs
Afghanistan	2	1	0	1	26	38	-12	4	5th–8th bracket
Bangladesh	2	0	0	2	15	41	-26	2	10th place

10 August

Bangladesh	10-21	Afghanistan

10 August

Thailand	28-5	Afghanistan

10 August

Thailand	20-5	Bangladesh

==== Pool C ====
Team	P	W	D	L	PF	PA	PD	Pts	Qualification
Singapore	2	2	0	0	77	12	+65	6	Advance to Cup playoffs
India	2	1	0	1	45	34	+11	4	5th–8th bracket
Brunei	2	0	0	2	7	83	-76	2	11th place

10 August

Brunei	7-33	India

10 August

Singapore	27-12	India

10 August

Singapore	50-0	Brunei

==== Pool D ====
Team	P	W	D	L	PF	PA	PD	Pts	Qualification
Malaysia	2	2	0	0	92	0	+92	6	Advance to Cup playoffs
Laos	2	0	0	2	0	92	-92	2	5th–8th bracket

10 August

Malaysia	36-0	Laos

10 August

Laos	0-56	Malaysia

=== Knockout stage ===
==== 5th–8th bracket ====
5th–8th playoffs
11 August
Indonesia	26
Laos	7
11 August
Afghanistan	12
India	17

Fifth place
11 August
Indonesia	14
India	24
Seventh place
11 August
Laos	7
Afghanistan	15

==== Cup playoffs ====
Semi-finals
11 August
Mongolia	0
Malaysia	26
11 August
Thailand	12
Singapore	14

Cup Final
11 August
Malaysia	17
Singapore	14
Third place
11 August
Mongolia	14
Thailand	24

== Series standings ==
Final standings over the three legs of the 2019 Asia Rugby Sevens Series:

Pos	Event Team	Incheon	Huizhou	Colombo	Total points	Qualification or relegation
1st place, gold medalist(s)	Japan	12	8	12	32	Entry to 2020 World Challenger Series
2nd place, silver medalist(s)	Hong Kong	10	12	10	32	Entry to 2020 World Challenger Series
3rd place, bronze medalist(s)	China	8	10	8	26	
4	Sri Lanka	5	7	7	19	
5	South Korea	7	5	1	13	
6	Philippines	4	2	5	11	
7	United Arab Emirates	2	1	4	7	
8	Chinese Taipei	1	4	2	7	Relegated to 2021 Asia Sevens Series#Trophy

== Incheon ==
The Korean leg of the series was held from 31 August to 1 September in Incheon.

=== Pool stage ===
==== Pool A ====
Team	P	W	D	L	PF	PA	PD	Pts	Qualification
Japan	3	3	0	0	96	24	+72	9	Advance to Cup playoffs
China	3	2	0	1	53	52	+1	7	Advance to Cup playoffs
Sri Lanka	3	1	0	2	40	77	–37	5	5th–8th bracket
United Arab Emirates	3	0	0	3	38	74	–36	3	5th–8th bracket

31 August
14:42

Sri Lanka	14–17	China

Incheon Namdong Field

31 August
15:04

Japan	29–7	United Arab Emirates

Incheon Namdong Field

31 August
17:38

China	24–14	United Arab Emirates

Incheon Namdong Field

31 August
18:00

Japan	43–5	Sri Lanka

Incheon Namdong Field

1 September
12:12

Sri Lanka	21–17	United Arab Emirates

Incheon Namdong Field

1 September
12:34

Japan	24–12	China

Incheon Namdong Field

==== Pool B ====
Team	P	W	D	L	PF	PA	PD	Pts	Qualification
Hong Kong	3	3	0	0	111	17	+94	9	Advance to Cup playoffs
South Korea	3	2	0	1	95	55	+40	7	Advance to Cup playoffs
Philippines	3	1	0	2	66	60	+6	5	5th–8th bracket
Chinese Taipei	3	0	0	3	14	154	–140	3	5th–8th bracket

31 August
13:58

Philippines	19–33	South Korea

Incheon Namdong Field

31 August
14:20

Hong Kong	62–0	Chinese Taipei

Incheon Namdong Field

31 August
16:54

South Korea	50–7	Chinese Taipei

Incheon Namdong Field

31 August
17:16

Hong Kong	20–5	Philippines

Incheon Namdong Field

1 September
11:28

Philippines	42–7	Chinese Taipei

Incheon Namdong Field

1 September
11:50

Hong Kong	29–12	South Korea

Incheon Namdong Field

=== Knockout stage ===
==== 5th–8th bracket ====
5th–8th playoffs
1 September – 14:24 – Incheon Namdong
Philippines	21
United Arab Emirates	19
1 September – 14:46 – Incheon Namdong
Chinese Taipei	0
Sri Lanka	42

Fifth place
1 September – 17:12 – Incheon Namdong
Philippines	14
Sri Lanka	21
Seventh place
1 September – 16:50 – Incheon Namdong
United Arab Emirates	31
Chinese Taipei	5

==== Cup playoffs ====
Semi-finals
1 September – 15:22 – Incheon Namdong
Hong Kong	21
China	7
1 September – 15:44 – Incheon Namdong
South Korea	5
Japan	43

Cup final
1 September – 18:40 – Incheon Namdong
Japan	21
Hong Kong	12
Third place
1 September – 17:56 – Incheon Namdong
China	24
South Korea	19

Source: Asia Rugby

== Huizhou ==
The China leg of the series was held on 14–15 September in Huizhou.

=== Pool stage ===
==== Pool A ====
Team	P	W	D	L	PF	PA	PD	Pts	Qualification
Japan	3	3	0	0	116	0	+116	9	Advance to Cup playoffs
Sri Lanka	3	2	0	1	54	59	-5	7	Advance to Cup playoffs
South Korea	3	1	0	2	17	73	-56	5	5th–8th bracket
Chinese Taipei	3	0	0	3	24	79	-55	3	5th–8th bracket

14 September
14:42

South Korea	5–28	Sri Lanka

Huizhou Olympic Stadium

14 September
15:04

Japan	41–0	Chinese Taipei

Huizhou Olympic Stadium

14 September
17:38

Sri Lanka	26–17	Chinese Taipei

Huizhou Olympic Stadium

14 September
18:00

Japan	38–0	South Korea

Huizhou Olympic Stadium

15 September
12:12

South Korea	12–7	Chinese Taipei

Huizhou Olympic Stadium

15 September
12:34

Japan	37–0	Sri Lanka

Huizhou Olympic Stadium

==== Pool B ====
Team	P	W	D	L	PF	PA	PD	Pts	Qualification
Hong Kong	3	3	0	0	88	14	+74	9	Advance to Cup playoffs
China	3	2	0	1	64	34	+30	7	Advance to Cup playoffs
United Arab Emirates	3	1	0	2	28	75	-47	5	5th–8th bracket
Philippines	3	0	0	3	32	89	-57	3	5th–8th bracket

14 September
13:58

China	21–15	Philippines

Huizhou Olympic Stadium

14 September
14:20

Hong Kong	22–7	United Arab Emirates

Huizhou Olympic Stadium

14 September
16:54

Philippines	17–21	United Arab Emirates

Huizhou Olympic Stadium

14 September
17:16

Hong Kong	19–7	China

Huizhou Olympic Stadium

15 September
11:28

China	36–0	United Arab Emirates

Huizhou Olympic Stadium

15 September
11:50

Hong Kong	47–0	Philippines

Huizhou Olympic Stadium

=== Knockout stage ===
==== 5th–8th bracket ====
5th–8th playoffs
15 September – 14:24 – Huizhou Olympic
United Arab Emirates	19
Chinese Taipei	24
15 September – 14:46 – Huizhou Olympic
South Korea	19
Philippines	7

Fifth place
15 September – 17:12 – Huizhou Olympic
Chinese Taipei	0
South Korea	17
Seventh place
15 September – 16:50 – Huizhou Olympic
United Arab Emirates	5
Philippines	26

==== Cup playoffs ====
Semi-finals
1 September – 15:22 – Huizhou Olympic
Hong Kong	55
Sri Lanka	0
1 September – 15:44 – Huizhou Olympic
Japan	7
China	14

Cup Final
1 September – 18:40 – Huizhou Olympic
Hong Kong	14
China	7
Third place
1 September – 17:56 – Huizhou Olympic
Sri Lanka	0
Japan	40

Source: Asia Rugby

== Colombo ==
The Sri Lanka leg of the series was held on 28–29 September in Colombo.

=== Pool stage ===
==== Pool A ====
Team	P	W	D	L	PF	PA	PD	Pts	Qualification
Hong Kong	3	3	0	0	113	0	+113	9	Advance to Cup playoffs
Sri Lanka	3	2	0	1	59	54	+5	7	Advance to Cup playoffs
United Arab Emirates	3	1	0	2	34	86	-52	5	5th–8th bracket
South Korea	3	0	0	3	27	93	-66	3	5th–8th bracket

28 September
15:42

Sri Lanka	24–10	South Korea

Racecourse Stadium

28 September
16:04

Hong Kong	34–0	United Arab Emirates

Racecourse Stadium

28 September
19:00

South Korea	17–24	United Arab Emirates

Racecourse Stadium

28 September
19:22

Hong Kong	34–0	Sri Lanka

Racecourse Stadium

29 September
12:12

Sri Lanka	35–10	United Arab Emirates

Racecourse Stadium

29 September
12:34

Hong Kong	45–0	South Korea

Racecourse Stadium

==== Pool B ====
Team	P	W	D	L	PF	PA	PD	Pts	Qualification
Japan	3	3	0	0	111	5	+106	9	Advance to Cup playoffs
China	3	2	0	1	59	50	+9	7	Advance to Cup playoffs
Philippines	3	1	0	2	63	61	+2	5	5th–8th bracket
Chinese Taipei	3	0	0	3	7	124	-117	3	5th–8th bracket

28 September
14:58

Japan	43–0	Chinese Taipei

Racecourse Stadium

28 September
15:20

China	19–17	Philippines

Racecourse Stadium

28 September
18:16

Chinese Taipei	7–41	Philippines

Racecourse Stadium

28 September
18:38

China	0–33	Japan

Racecourse Stadium

29 September
11:28

Japan	35–5	Philippines

Racecourse Stadium

29 September
11:50

China	40–0	Chinese Taipei

Racecourse Stadium

=== Knockout stage ===
==== 5th–8th bracket ====
5th–8th playoffs
29 September – 14:24 – Racecourse Stadium
South Korea	12
Philippines	22
29 September – 14:46 – Racecourse Stadium
Chinese Taipei	0
United Arab Emirates	38

Fifth place
29 September – 17:12 – Racecourse Stadium
Philippines	19
United Arab Emirates	14
Seventh place
29 September – 16:50 – Racecourse Stadium
South Korea	12
Chinese Taipei	19

==== Cup playoffs ====
Semi-finals
29 September – 15:22 – Racecourse Stadium
Sri Lanka	0
Japan	45
29 September – 15:44 – Racecourse Stadium
China	19
Hong Kong	24

Cup Final
29 September – 18:40 – Racecourse Stadium
Japan	17
Hong Kong	12
Third place
29 September – 17:56 – Racecourse Stadium
Sri Lanka	12
China	27

Source: Asia Rugby

== See also ==
- 2019 Asia Rugby Women's Sevens Series
