= Bangladesh national rugby sevens team =

Bangladesh Men's Rugby Sevens
- Union: Bangladesh Rugby Federation Union (BRFU)
- Coach: Shariar Hossain Addra
- Captain: Jwel Rana

First international
- Bangladesh 0–47 Lebanon (Chennai, India; 20 February 2016)

Largest win
- Bangladesh 55-0 Nepal (Doha, Qatar; 4 March 2017)

Largest defeat
- Bangladesh 0–70 Taiwan (Chennai, India; 21 February 2016)

World Cup Sevens
- Appearances: 0

The Bangladesh national rugby union sevens team currently competes in the Asian Sevens Series. It is managed by Bangladesh Rugby Federation Union

In 2018 Bangladesh won the Bowl final of the Asia Rugby Sevens Series Trophy in Singapore.

== History ==
The team first participated in 2016 as part of the Asia Rugby Development Sevens Series held over two legs in Chennai, India and Dubai, United Arab Emirates, ending up in joint 7th place with Iran in the standings at the conclusion of the two legs.

== Current squad ==
S/N	Player
1	Paritosh Chakma
2	Jwel Rana (Captain)
3	Obaidur Rahman (Vice Captain)
4	Taniur Hossain
5	Mehedi Hasan
6	Sohel Rana
7	Sree Tipu Ronzon
8	Sohel Ahmed
9	Saddam Hossain

== Fixtures & results ==
=== 2025 ===
23 November 2025	Bangladesh	0–15	Nepal	National Stadium , Dhaka
11:00

23 November 2025	Bangladesh	15–26	Nepal	National Stadium , Dhaka
13:30

== Tournament history ==
=== Asia Rugby Sevens Trophy ===
Asia Rugby Sevens Trophy records
Host	Result	Position	GP	W	D	L	PF	PA
(India) (United Arab Emirates) 2016	7th-place	7/13	6	2	0	4	57	192
(Qatar) 2017	Group stages	10/11	2	1	0	1	67	24
(Singapore) 2018	Bowl Semi-finals	9/12	3	0	0	3	107	59
(Indonesia) 2019	Bowl stage	10/11	4	1	0	3	74	60
(Thailand) 2022	6th place	6/6	5	0	1	4	12	167
(Nepal) 2024	13th place	13/14	4	1	0	3	48	130
Total	No Titles	6/6	24	5	1	18	365	632

== Team staff & management ==
As of 23 November 2025

Position	Name
Team Manager	(Bangladesh) SIM Ferrous Alom
Head Coach	(Bangladesh) Shariar Hossain Addra
Assist Coach	(Bangladesh) Abdul Kader Sumon
Consultant	(Portugal) Auguste Louis Jouen
Physio	(Bangladesh) Delowar Hossain

== See also ==
- Rugby union in Bangladesh
