= Rugby sevens at the 2017 SEA Games – Women's tournament =

Rugby Sevens – Women's tournament at the 2017 SEA Games
- Venue: Petaling Jaya Stadium
- Dates: 19 – 20 August 2017
- Nations: 5

Medalists
gold medal	Thailand (THA)
silver medal	Singapore (SGP)
bronze medal	Malaysia (MAS)

The women's rugby sevens tournament at the 2017 Southeast Asian Games was held from 19 to 20 August in Malaysia. In this tournament, 5 Southeast Asian teams will play in the women's competition.

All matches will be played at Petaling Jaya Stadium in Petaling Jaya.

== Competition schedule ==
The following was the competition schedule for the women's rugby sevens competitions:

G	Group stage	½	Semifinals	B	3rd place play-off	F	Final

Sat 19	Sun 20			
G	G	½	B	F

== Participating nations ==
The following five teams participated in the women's competition.

- Laos (LAO)
- Malaysia (MAS)
- Philippines (PHI)
- Singapore (SGP)
- Thailand (THA)

== Draw ==
There is no official draw since only 6 teams are participating in this competition. All teams are automatically drawn into one group.

== Results ==
- All times are Malaysia Standard Time (UTC+8).

=== Group stage ===
Pos	Team	Pld	W	D	L	PF	PA	PD	Pts	Qualification
1	Thailand	4	4	0	0	143	15	+128	12	Final round
2	Singapore	4	3	0	1	81	29	+52	10	Final round
3	Malaysia (H)	4	1	1	2	46	60	−14	7	Final round
4	Philippines	4	1	1	2	36	62	−26	7	Final round
5	Laos	4	0	0	4	5	145	−140	4	

Updated to match(es) played on 20 August 2017. Source: Schedule
(H) Hosts

19 August 2017
10:00

Thailand	32–0	Philippines

19 August 2017
10:22

Singapore	17–0	Malaysia

19 August 2017
12:38

Thailand	24–10	Singapore

19 August 2017
13:00

Malaysia	36–0	Laos

19 August 2017
15:16

Philippines	31–0	Laos

19 August 2017
15:38

Thailand	38–5	Malaysia

19 August 2017
17:32

Singapore	25–0	Philippines

19 August 2017
17:54

Thailand	49–0	Laos

20 August 2017
11:06

Singapore	29–5	Laos

20 August 2017
11:28

Philippines	5–5	Malaysia

=== Final round ===
Semi-finals
20 August – 13:44
Thailand	26
Philippines	0
20 August – 14:06
Singapore	22
Malaysia	0

Gold medal match
20 August – 16:44
Thailand	17
Singapore	10
Bronze medal match
20 August – 16:22
Philippines	5
Malaysia	7

==== Semi-finals ====
20 August 2017
13:44

Thailand	26–0	Philippines

20 August 2017
14:06

Singapore	22–0	Malaysia

==== Bronze medal match ====
20 August 2017
16:22

Philippines	5–7	Malaysia

==== Gold medal match ====
20 August 2017
16:44

Thailand	17–10	Singapore

== See also ==
- Men's tournament
