= Rugby union in Bangladesh =

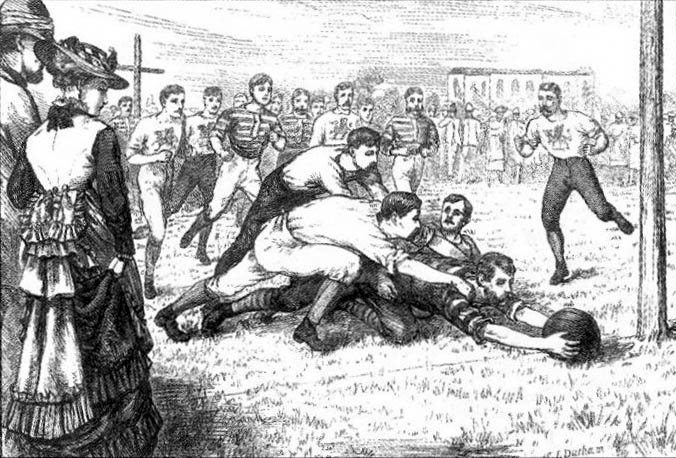
- Europeans playing rugby in Bengal in 1875. On new generation time fram Bangladesh Started Rugby at 2006 with belong Mr Mousum Ali. Now Bangladesh Rugby Federation Union is the Governing body of the game.
- Country: Bangladesh
- Governing body: Bangladesh Rugby Federation Union
- National team: Bangladesh
- First played: pre-1875
- Registered players: as full member of Asia Rugby
- Clubs: Bangladesh Army Rugby Team, Topdeal, Flame boys and Girls, Azad Sporting, Bangladesh Amateur Rugby Club, Addsel, JBRC, Victoria Sporting club

Rugby union in Bangladesh is a minor sport but one of the fastest-growing games in Bangladesh.

== Governing body ==
The governing body is the Bangladesh Rugby Federation Union. Bangladesh Rugby Federation is Member of National Sports Council, Member of Bangladesh Olympic Association and Regional Association Asia Rugby.

== History ==
=== Pre-independence Bengal ===
Like other sports founded in England and brought to the subcontinent during the British Raj, such as cricket, rugby union has a long history. Bangladeshi rugby's history may be discontinuous, but it dates back to the Bengal Presidency, when East Bengal (future Bangladesh) and West Bengal (now in India) were politically united. Rugby became particularly popular in Calcutta, the capital of Bengal at that time. The earliest trace of Rugby Football in the subcontinent dates back to a scratch match or two played in Calcutta and Madras during the visit of HMS Galatea in 1871. The teak goal posts used on the occasion of the Calcutta Match were afterward used by the C.F.C. up to at least 1886. The first recorded match was played on Christmas Day 1872, at CFC in Calcutta, it was played between England and a combined team of Scotland, Ireland and Wales. The game caught on and had to be repeated within the week. This is why the Calcutta Cup, the oldest trophy in international rugby bears the name it does.

A number of Bengali noblemen sent their children to English private schools, and they also picked up the game there.

However, because of the climate in the region, other sports such as cricket, polo, and tennis became more popular, and rugby went into decline in the region. And like other areas in Asia and Africa, the game became too connected with the British expatriate community, meaning that when Bangladesh became independent (as East Pakistan), the game more or less died. However, despite not being successful in Bangladesh, rugby union in Sri Lanka, which has an even hotter climate has been highly successful.

=== Post-independence ===
Rugby had little or no presence from the period of independence from Britain, and thence from Pakistan.

However, in 2007, after a long period of dormancy, some Japanese coaches started a youth programme. Amongst the schools which sent under-12s to the training camp were the Sunbeams, the Sunnydale, Marie Curie School, The Agha Khan School, Playpan, Reading, Green James, Khilgaon Oxford School, Dhanmondi Boys' High School, Khilgaon Model School and East Khilgaon Primary School. The Bangladeshi Rugby Federation Union has been training these children in order to start an inter-schools tournament. In 2018 Bangladesh won bowl group of 2018 Asia Rugby Sevens Series
