= Afghanistan national rugby sevens team =

Afghanistan
- Union: Afghanistan Rugby Federation

First international
- South Korea 42–5 Afghanistan (2018 Asian Games 30 August)

World Cup Sevens
- Appearances: 0

Afghanistan national rugby sevens team is a rugby sevens team that represents Afghanistan. The national team played their first international tournament at the 2018 Asian Games where they just missed out on qualifying through to the quarter finals.

== History ==
Afghanistan's first appearance at a tournament was the 2018 Asian Games held in Indonesia with a team that was full of Afghan expatriates. They would only record the one win in the tournament against the United Arab Emirates finishing ninth of the twelve teams competing. With the focus being on rugby sevens they competed in the trophy where the team seventh of eleven teams with a single win over Bangladesh

== Tournament history ==
=== Summer Olympics ===
Olympic Games record
Year	Round	Position	Pld	W	L	D
(Brazil) 2016	Did Not Enter					
(Japan) 2020	Did not qualify					
Total	0 Titles	0/0	-	-	-	-

=== Asian Games ===
Asian Games record
Year	Round	Position	Pld	W	L	D
(Indonesia) 2018	Group Stage	9th	6	4	2	0
Total	Group Stage	1/1	6	4	2	0
