= Bahrain national rugby sevens team =

Rugby team

The Bahrain national rugby sevens team is a minor sevens side. They have competed in the Hong Kong Sevens. They are traditionally seen as "minnows". For example, in the 1989 Hong Kong Sevens, they lost 52–0 to New Zealand and 24–4 to the Netherlands.

== History ==
The first team representing Bahrain at sevens competed at the Hong Kong Sevens in 1978 (doing so for seven non-consecutive tournaments until 1989). However this was likely the Bahrain RFC founded in 1971, containing exclusively foreign nationals.

The first official team played in the 2023 Asia Rugby Sevens Trophy held in Doha, Qatar where they reached the final, losing to Thailand.

== Tournament history ==
=== Hong Kong Sevens ===
Year	Venue	Cup			Plate	
Year	Venue	Winner	Final Score	Runner-up	Winner	Runner-up
1978; Details	HK Football Club Stadium	Fiji	14-10	Manawatu	Bahrain	Singapore
1985; Details	HK Football Club Stadium	Australia	24-10	(United Kingdom); Public School Wanderers	Tonga	Bahrain

- 1979: Plate Semi-finals
- 1983: Plate Quarter-finals
- 1984: Plate Quarter-finals
- 1987: Plate Quarter-finals

=== Asia Rugby Sevens Trophy ===
Asia Rugby Sevens Trophy record
Year	Round	Position	Pld	W	L	D
(Qatar) 2023	Finalists	2nd	4	2	1	1
(Nepal) 2024	Cup quarter-finals	5th	5	3	2	0
(Oman) 2025	Cup quarter-finals	5th	5	4	1	0
Total	0 Titles	3/3	14	9	4	1
