= Michael Letts =

Philippines international rugby union player

- Born: Michael Robrigado Letts; 15 February 1983 (age 43) Sydney, Australia
- Height: 6 ft 2 in (1.88 m)
- Weight: 90 kg (200 lb; 14 st)

Rugby union career
- Position: Fullback
International career
Years	Team	Apps	(Points)
	Philippines		(20)
National sevens team
Years	Team		Comps
2012	Philippines 7s		

Michael Robrigado Letts (born 15 February 1985) is an Australian–Filipino rugby union player and is the captain of the Philippines national rugby union team.

== Personal life ==
He was born in Sydney, Australia to an Australian father and a Filipina mother who hails from Bicol.
