= Indonesia national rugby sevens team =

The Indonesia national rugby union sevens is a minor sevens side. They have competed at the Hong Kong Sevens, and were runners up in the plate competition in 1977.

== History ==
Rugby was first introduced in Indonesia during the Dutch colonial period, and was played mostly by ex-pats. In March 1976 an Indonesian Sevens squad, alongside twelve other nations, participated in the inaugural Hong Kong Sevens tournament. Indonesia returned to Hong Kong again for the 1976 tournament where they lost to Tonga in the plate final. Indonesia continued to participate in the tournament until 1986 after which, interest began to wane and the program went on hiatus.

Indonesia returned to competitive sevens rugby at the 2012 HSBC Asian Rugby Sevens Series after having some success with their fifteens program.

== Tournament Record ==
| Year | Tournament | Host | Venue | W | L | Place |
|---|---|---|---|---|---|---|
| 1976 | Hong Kong Sevens | Hong Kong | HK Football Club Stadium, Hong Kong | ― | ― | DNP |
| 1977 | Hong Kong Sevens | Hong Kong | HK Football Club Stadium, Hong Kong | ― | ― | 4th |
| 1978 | Hong Kong Sevens | Hong Kong | HK Football Club Stadium, Hong Kong | ― | ― | DNP |
| 1980 | Hong Kong Sevens | Hong Kong | HK Football Club Stadium, Hong Kong | ― | ― | DNP |
| 1981 | Hong Kong Sevens | Hong Kong | HK Football Club Stadium, Hong Kong | ― | ― | DNP |
| 1982 | Hong Kong Sevens | Hong Kong | HK Football Club Stadium, Hong Kong | ― | ― | DNP |
| 1983 | Hong Kong Sevens | Hong Kong | HK Football Club Stadium, Hong Kong | ― | ― | DNP |
| 1984 | Hong Kong Sevens | Hong Kong | HK Football Club Stadium, Hong Kong | ― | ― | DNP |
| 1985 | Hong Kong Sevens | Hong Kong | HK Football Club Stadium, Hong Kong | ― | ― | DNP |
| 1986 | Hong Kong Sevens | Hong Kong | HK Football Club Stadium, Hong Kong | ― | ― | DNP |
| 2013 | HSBC Asian Rugby Sevens Series | Singapore | Yio Chu Kang Stadium, Ang Mo Kio | ― | ― | 11th |
| 2016 | Asia Rugby Sevens Series | India | Nehru Jawaharlal Stadium. Chennai | 1 | 4 | 10th |
| 2017 | Southeast Asian Games | Malaysia | Petaling Jaya Stadium. Petaling Jaya | 2 | 4 | 5th |
| 2018 | Asia Rugby Sevens Series | Philippines | Clark Parade Grounds, Mabalacat | 4 | 1 | 5th |
| 2018 | Asian Games | Indonesia | Senayan Rugby Pitch, Jakarta | 1 | 5 | 11th |
| 2019 | Southeast Asian Games | Philippines | Clark Parade Grounds, Mabalacat | 2 | 4 | 5th |
| 2019 | Asia Rugby Sevens Series | Indonesia | Gelora Bung Karno Sports Complex, Jakarta | 2 | 2 | 6th |
| 2022 | Asia Rugby Sevens Series | Indonesia | JGBK Rugby Pitch, Jakarta | 1 | 3 | 8th |

(DNP) = Did not place, (―) = W/L record unavailable

== Players ==
=== 2017 S.E.A. Games ===
Head coach: (Indonesia) Iswahyudi

1. Yohanes Musi Uran Mema
2. Agus Maulana Setiawan
3. Muhammad Yacob
4. Muhammad Rifaldi
5. Asmuri
6. Buldan Muhammad Abdurohman
7. Tri Aji Utomo
8. Aris Triyanto
9. Christopher Adhitya Hardwika
10. Nanda Septian Oloan Siregar
11. Andika Yudistira Pratama
12. Andre Fiksi Gumilang

=== 2018 Asian Games ===
Head coach: (New Zealand) George Dennis Wilson

1. Nanda Septian Oloan Siregar
2. Handika Hadi Wibowo
3. Fransiscus Lohtar Matius Sinaga
4. Yusuf Satria Nugroho Bagong Putra
5. Aqiel Azis Safrurrozi
6. Buldan Muhammad Abdurrohman
7. Lawrence Oiyaitou
8. Dionysius Oktavian Andi Pratikno
9. Christopher Adhitya Hardwika
10. Muhammad Rifaldi
11. Andika Yudistira Pratama
12. Muhammad Danial Al Fikri
