= Qatar national rugby sevens team =

The Qatar national rugby sevens team is a minor national sevens side. They competed at the 2017 Asia Rugby Sevens Series in the Trophy Division.

== Asian Games ==
=== 2006 Asian Games ===
Group C matches -

Team	Pts	Pld	W	L	GW	GL
Japan	6	2	2	0	82	7
Chinese Taipei	4	2	1	1	89	24
Qatar	2	2	0	2	0	140

December 10

Chinese Taipei	82 – 0	Qatar
Japan	58 – 0	Qatar
Chinese Taipei	7 – 24	Japan
