= Pakistan national rugby sevens team =

Pakistan
- Union: Pakistan Rugby Union
- Coach: Shakeel Ahmed
Team kit

The Pakistan national rugby sevens team first took part in the 2006 Singer Sevens in Kandy, Sri Lanka. Playing three matches, they lost all three, against the Arabian Gulf, hosts Sri Lanka and India respectively, failing to register a single point in the process.

== Results ==
=== 2009 ===
Rugby Sevens – Pakistan internationals in 2009
| Date | Location | Opposition | Result | Tournament |
|---|---|---|---|---|
| 28–29 October | Colombo | Sri Lanka | 0-52 | 2009 Carlton Sevens |
| 28–29 October | Colombo | South Korea | 0-24 | 2009 Carlton Sevens |
| 28–29 October | Colombo | Iran | **19-17** | 2009 Carlton Sevens |
| 28–29 October | Colombo | Brunei | **26-7** | 2009 Carlton Sevens |

=== 2010 ===
Rugby Sevens – Pakistan internationals in 2010
| Date | Location | Opposition | Result | Tournament |
|---|---|---|---|---|
| 2–3 April | New Delhi | Malaysia | | 2010 Commonwealth Games Sevens Test Event |
| 2–3 April | New Delhi | Sri Lanka | | 2010 Commonwealth Games Sevens Test Event |
| 2–3 April | New Delhi | Kazakhstan | | 2010 Commonwealth Games Sevens Test Event |

- Pakistan wins in **bold**.
