= China national rugby sevens team =

China
- Union: Chinese Rugby Football Association

World Cup Sevens
- Appearances: 0

The People's Republic of China national rugby sevens team has played in the Sri Lanka Sevens and at the Asian Games.

Tournament History

Summer Olympics

== Tournament history ==
=== Summer Olympics ===
Olympic Games record
Year	Round	Position	Pld	W	L	D	Qualifying
(Brazil) 2016	Did not qualify						Finished 5th at the 2015 ARFU Men's Sevens Championships.
(Japan) 2020	Did not qualify						Withdrew from Olympic repechage

=== Asian Sevens Series ===
Season	Round 1	Round 2	Round 3	Pos	Points
2015	(China); Qingdao; 11th	(Thailand); Bangkok; 8th	(Sri Lanka); Colombo; 6th	5th	25
2016	Hong Kong; 4th	(South Korea); Seoul; 4th	(Sri Lanka); Colombo (bronze)	4th	22
2017	Hong Kong; 4th	(South Korea); Seoul; 4th	(Sri Lanka); Colombo; 7th	5th	16
2018	Hong Kong; 5th	(South Korea); Seoul (bronze)	(Sri Lanka); Colombo; 5th	5th	16
2019	(South Korea); Seoul (bronze)	(China); Huizhou (silver)	(Sri Lanka); Colombo (bronze)	3rd	26

=== Asian Games ===
Asian Games Record
Year	Round	Position	Pld	W	L	D
(Thailand) 1998	did not enter					
(South Korea) 2002	5th-6th Playoff	5th	4	2	2	0
(Qatar) 2006	Bronze Medal Match	3rd place, bronze medalist(s)	4	3	1	0
(China) 2010	Bronze Medal Match	4th	6	4	2	0
(South Korea) 2014	Quarter-finalists	6th	6	3	3	0
(Indonesia) 2018	Quarter-finalists	6th	6	3	3	0

=== Hong Kong Sevens ===
Year	Venue	Cup			Plate	
Year	Venue	Winner	Final Score	Runner-up	Winner	Runner-up
2006; Details	Hong Kong Stadium	England	26-24	Fiji	Wales	China

=== Sri Lanka Rugby 7s ===
Year	Cup	Plate	Bowl
1999	South Korea	Malaysia	India
2000	Chinese Taipei	Japan	Thailand
2001	Chinese Taipei	Denmark	Czech Republic
2002	Portugal	South Korea	Hong Kong
2003	Kenya	Sri Lanka	Arabian Gulf
2004	Japan	Sri Lanka	Kazakhstan
2005	Japan	Sri Lanka	Arabian Gulf
2006	South Korea	Thailand	Malaysia
2007	Hong Kong	China	India
2008	South Korea	Chinese Taipei	Singapore

== Players ==
=== Previous Squads ===
Squad to 2012 Hong Kong Sevens:

- Chen Xuesen
- Li Sheng
- Lu Peng
- Cao Zhiwen
- Li Jialin
- Lu Zhuan
- Li Yang
- Long Hanxiao
- Su Hailiang
- Wang Jiacheng
- Wang Chongyi
- Liu Guanjun
