= Brunei national rugby sevens team =

Brunei Darussalam
- Union: Brunei Rugby Football Union
- Coach: (England) John Beart
- Captain: Lim Shen Quan
Team kit

World Cup Sevens
- Appearances: 0

The Brunei national rugby union sevens team is the national men's rugby team for Brunei.

The team competes in the IRB Asian Sevens Series. In 2009, the team defeated Laos and Indonesia during the inaugural IRB Asian Sevens Series in 2009.

In 2016, the team competed in the Borneo 7s in Sandakan and the Singapore SEA 7s. Brunei placed 6th out of 8, above Singapore development and Indonesia.

== IRB Asian Sevens Series record ==
2009 Series (12th overall)
First Day	Event	Finish
2009-09-12	Shanghai	Did Not Compete
2009-10-24	Brunei	Plate Runners Up
2009-10-31	Borneo	Bowl Semi-Finalists
2009-11-20	Kish Island	Did Not Compete
2009-11-27	Sri Lanka	Bowl Semi-Finalists

Current Squad current squad As at 31 October 2009 for the Borneo and Sri Lanka tournaments:

Player	Club
Faez Anuar	Bandar Blacks
Augustine Mulok	KB Pythons
Cassidy Enggau	KB Pythons
Christian Danial Wong	KB Pythons
Damian Donnavan	Bandar Blacks
George Pyrgos	No Club
Lim Shen Quan	Bandar Blacks
Muhammad Ziyad	KB Pythons
Nobel Lee	Bandar Blacks
Petrus Tuan	KB Pythons
Richard Chu	KB Pythons
Ronny Tarang	Bandar Blacks
Richard Gillam	Bandar Blacks

== Honours ==
- 2009 Brunei 7s Plate Runners up
