= Iran national rugby sevens team =

Iran
- Union: Iran Rugby Federation
Team kit

The Iran national rugby sevens team first took part in the 2009 Carlton Sevens in Colombo, Sri Lanka. Playing three matches, they lost all three, against Japan, Kazakhstan and Pakistan respectively.

== Rugby Sevens Results ==
=== 2009 ===
Rugby Sevens – Iran internationals in 2009
Date	Location	Opposition	Result	Tournament
28–29 October	Colombo	Japan	0-33	2009 Carlton Sevens
28–29 October	Colombo	Kazakhstan	7-15	2009 Carlton Sevens
28–29 October	Colombo	Pakistan	17-19	2009 Carlton Sevens

=== 2010 ===
Rugby Sevens – Iran internationals in 2010
Date	Location	Opposition	Result	Tournament
2–3 April	New Delhi	India		2010 Commonwealth Games Sevens Test Event
2–3 April	New Delhi	Brunei		2010 Commonwealth Games Sevens Test Event
2–3 April	New Delhi	Uzbekistan		2010 Commonwealth Games Sevens Test Event

- Iran wins in **bold**. Rugby sevens at the 2010 Commonwealth Games The 2010 Commonwealth Games Sevens test event, held in Delhi, India, was a precursor to the main rugby sevens tournament at the Games. This event, held in April 2010, was the first international Rugby 7s event to be held in India and served to test the venue and logistics for the main event.

=== By Year ===
Asia Rugby Sevens Series

2025:

2024:

2023:

IRI 36-5 IRQ / IRI 33-0 MGL / IRI 12-5 JOR / IRI 5-22 BHR

2022:

IRI 0-22 AFG / IRI 5-22 THA / IRI 45-0 PAK / IRI 7-31 THA / IRI 31-10 KAZ

2021:

IRI 40-14 LBN / IRI 19-12 QAT / IRI 24-22 QAT / IRI 14-31 UAE / IRI 0-26 UAE / IRI 59-0 PLE

2020:

2019:

2018:

2017:

IRI 0-42 PHI / IRI 17-5 IND / IRI 10-24 QAT / IRI 33-5 BAN / IRI 0-31 THA

2016:

IRI 24-5 PAK / IRI 15-24 IND / IRI 29-17 LBN / IRI 7-19 UAE / IRI 12-28 PHI / IRI 20-17 QAT

2015:

IRI 5-22 TPE / IRI 10-31 SRI / IRI 0-46 HKG / IRI 12-29 MAS / IRI 10-38 PHI /

IRI 28-5 UZB / IRI 19-0 UZB / IRI 17-12 IND / IRI 15-17 IND / IRI 24-0 UAE / IRI 31-0 LAO

2014:

IRI 19-7 JOR / IRI 44-0 KSA / IRI 10-5 LBN / IRI 26-0 AFG / IRI 28-14 / IRI 26-0 UAE

2013:

IRI 22-7 UAE / IRI 17-5 AFG / IRI 33-7 AFG / IRI 17-12 AFG / IRI 20-0 LBN

IRI 12-7 UAE / IRI 24-5 UAE / IRI 5-32 CHN / IRI 14-19 KAZ / IRI 47-0 AFG / IRI 14-14 IND / IRI 45-5 AFG / IRI 7-14 IND

2012:

IRI 14-17 UAE / IRI 42-7 AFG / IRI 22-7 IND / IRI 0-21 CHN / IRI 0-24 SRI / IRI 0-21 MAS

2011:

IRI 0-20 KAZ / IRI 12-7 SIN / IRI 0-41 HKG / IRI 5-42 UAE / IRI 28-19 SIN

2010:

Asian 7s Invitational: IRI ?-? KAZ / IRI ?-? BRU / IRI 47-0 PAK / IRI 33-7 UZB / IRI 0-28 IND / IRI 57-0 BRU

2009: 2009 Carlton Rugby 7s

IRI 7-15 KAZ / IRI 0-33 JPN / IRI 17-19 PAK

== U20 Rugby Sevens ==
No team (2025).

== U18 Rugby Sevens ==
Asia Rugby U19 Championship

30/9/2023 1/10/2023 AR U18s Boys & Girls 7s Taiwan

Founded in 2023.

Results:

2023 AR U18s Boys - 7th Place (of 7)

1. IRI 7-47 HKG
2. IRI 0-22 IND
3. IRI 0-22 MAS
4. IRI 10-17 THA

== Rugby league Results ==
No team (2025).

== Rugby Union Results ==
Founded in 2007

=== Season ===
2022 Defeated in Final West Asia in Asian Rugby Championship - Division 3:

2018 Defeated in Final West Asia in Asian Rugby Championship - Division 3:

2017 Third in West Asia in Asian Rugby Championship - Division 3:

2016 Third in West Central Asia in Asian Rugby Championship - Division 3:

2015 Second in West in Asian Rugby Championship - Division 3: and Third in Poule B in Crescent Cup:

2014 Winner in 3rd place final in Asian 5 Nations - Division 2: (relegated to Asian Rugby Championship - Division 3:)

2013 Winner in 3rd place final in Asian 5 Nations - Division 2:

2012 Winner in 3rd place final in Asian 5 Nations - Division 2:

2011 Winner in 3rd place final in Asian 5 Nations - Division 2:

2010 Winner in Final in Asian 5 Nations - Division 3: (promoted to Asian 5 Nations - Division 2:)

2009 Winner in 3rd place final in Asian 5 Nations - Division 3:

2008 Winner in Central Asia in Asian 5 Nations - Regional Tournaments: (promoted to Asian 5 Nations - Division 3:)

2006 Winner in Asian Championship - Division 3:

=== Results ===
Years	W	D	L	F	A
2023	0	0	1	12	40
2018	1	0	1	34	37
2017	0	1	1	37	38
2016	0	0	2	24	69
2015	1	0	1	57	30
2014	1	0	1	48	66
2013	1	0	1	40	61
2012	1	0	1	69	40
2011	1	0	1	61	53
2010	2	0	0	63	17
2009	1	0	1	48	28
2008	2	0	0	38	22
2007	3	0	0	93	21

Total 14 1 11 624-522 +102

Due to political riots, it was cancelled in 2006 and rescheduled in 2007.

1. Iran 39-7 India
2. Iran 32-3 Pakistan
3. Iran 22-11 Pakistan
4. Iran 8-6 Uzbekistan
5. Iran 30-16 Kyrgyzstan
6. Iran 48-13 Indonesia
7. Iran 0-15 Philippines
8. Iran 19-6 Pakistan
9. Iran 44-11 Guam
10. Iran 30-19 India
11. Iran 31-34 Chinese Taipei
12. Iran 52-3 China
13. Iran 17-37 Thailand
14. Iran 30-13 India
15. Iran 10-48 Malaysia
16. Iran 26-23 Thailand
17. Iran 22-43 Malaysia
18. Iran 8-27 Lebanon
19. Iran 49-3 Jordan
20. Iran 12-34 Lebanon
21. Iran 12-35 Qatar
22. Iran 24-25 Lebanon
23. Iran 13-13 Uzbekistan
24. Iran 17-8 Qatar
25. Iran 17-29 Lebanon
26. Iran 12-40 Qatar
