= Hong Kong national rugby sevens team =

Hong Kong Sevens
- Union: Hong Kong Rugby Football Union
- Coach: Jevon Groves

World Cup Sevens
- Appearances: 8 (First in 1993)
- Best result: 10th (1997)

Hong Kong national rugby sevens team
Medal record

Asia Rugby Sevens Series
Gold medal – first place	2012	
Gold medal – first place	2014	
Gold medal – first place	2016	
Gold medal – first place	2021	
Gold medal – first place	2022	
Gold medal – first place	2023	
Gold medal – first place	2024	
Gold medal – first place	2025	
Silver medal – second place	2011	
Silver medal – second place	2013	
Silver medal – second place	2015	
Silver medal – second place	2017	
Silver medal – second place	2018	
Silver medal – second place	2019	
Bronze medal – third place	2009	

Asian Games
Gold medal – first place	2018 Jakarta	Team
Gold medal – first place	2022 Hangzhou	Team
Gold medal – first place	2026 Aichi–Nagoya	Team
Silver medal – second place	2010 Guangzhou	Team
Silver medal – second place	2014 Incheon	Team

East Asian Games
Silver medal – second place	2009 Hong Kong	Team

The Hong Kong national rugby sevens team is a regular participant in the Rugby World Cup Sevens. The team's greatest achievements include winning the gold medal 3 times in a row at the 2018, 2022 and 2026 Asian Games and winning the Asian Sevens Series a record 8 times.

== History ==
The men's and women's Hong Kong national sevens teams were granted elite sport status by the Hong Kong Sports Institute on 1 April 2013, which means the HKRFU national sevens teams receive an annual stipend to be distributed to qualified players from the target teams.

In November 2013, former Wales sevens coach Gareth Baber took over as head of the men's rugby sevens programme at the Hong Kong Sports Institute. At the same time former coach, Dai Rees, was promoted to be the HKRFU's head of technical development and performance.

=== 2024 ===
They qualified for the 2024 World Rugby Sevens Challenger Series in Dubai. In round one of the tournament, they were knocked out of the quarter-final by Germany. They went on to beat Georgia for seventh place. They finished the overall series in fifth place.

== Tournament history ==
=== Rugby World Cup Sevens ===
Rugby World Cup Sevens Record
Tournament	Round	Position	Pld	W	L	D
(Scotland) 1993	Group Stage	17th	5	1	4	0
(Hong Kong) 1997	Plate Finalist	10th	7	4	3	0
(Argentina) 2001	Bowl Quarterfinalist	21st	6	0	6	0
(Hong Kong) 2005	Bowl Quarterfinalist	21st	6	0	6	0
(United Arab Emirates) 2009	Bowl Semifinalist	19th	5	1	4	0
(Russia) 2013	Bowl Quarterfinalist	21st	4	1	3	0
(United States) 2018	Bowl Finalist	18th	4	2	2	0
(South Africa) 2022	19th Place Final	19th	4	2	2	0
Total	0 Titles	8/8	41	11	30	0

=== Asian Games ===
Asian Games record
Year	Round	Position	Pld	W	L	D
(Thailand) 1998	Classification	5th	3	1	2	0
(South Korea) 2002	Group Stage	7th	3	0	3	0
(Qatar) 2006	Classification	5th	3	2	1	0
(China) 2010	Runner-Up	2nd	7	5	2	0
(South Korea) 2014	Runner-Up	2nd	6	5	1	0
(Indonesia) 2018	Champions	1st	6	6	0	0
(China) 2022	Champions	1st	6	6	0	0
(Japan) 2026	Champions	1st	6	6	0	0
Total	3 Titles	N/A	38	29	9	0

=== Asia Rugby Sevens Series ===
Asia Rugby Sevens Series record
Year	Round	Position	Pld	W	L	D	Ref
(Malaysia) 2009	2nd Runner Up	3rd					
(China) (Malaysia) 2010	Plate	5th					
(China) (Malaysia) 2011	Runner-Up	2nd					
(China) (Malaysia) 2012	Champions	1st					
(Thailand) (Malaysia) (Singapore) 2013	Runner-Up	2nd					
(Hong Kong) (Malaysia) (China) 2014	Champions	1st					
(China) (Thailand) (Sri Lanka) 2015	Runner-Up	2nd	15	12	3	0	
(Hong Kong) (South Korea) (Sri Lanka) 2016	Champions	1st	15	13	2	0	
(Hong Kong) (South Korea) (Sri Lanka) 2017	Runner-Up	2nd	18	15	3	0	
(Hong Kong) (South Korea) (Sri Lanka) 2018	Runner-Up	2nd	15	12	3	0	
(South Korea) (China) (Sri Lanka) 2019	Runner-Up	2nd	15	13	2	0	
2020	Not held due to the COVID-19 pandemic						
(United Arab Emirates) 2021	Champions	1st	5	5	0	0	
(Thailand) (South Korea) (United Arab Emirates) 2022	Champions	1st	15	14	0	1	
(Thailand) (South Korea) 2023	Champions	1st	-	-	-	-	
(Thailand) (South Korea) (China) 2024	Champions	1st	-	-	-	-	
(Sri Lanka) (China) 2025	Champions	1st	-	-	-	-	-
Total	8 Titles	N/A	98	84	13	1	

== Current squad ==
Squad for the 2024 World Rugby Sevens Challenger Series in Dubai.

No.	Players
4	Pierce Mackinlay-West
5	Callum McCullough
6	Liam Doherty
7	Harry Sayers
8	Max Denmark
9	Bryn Phillips
10	Russell Webb
11	Seb Brien
17	Fong Kit Fung
20	James Christie
27	Cado Lee
54	Liam Herbert

== Player records ==
=== World Rugby Sevens Series ===
As of 27 September 2021, or after the 2021 Canada Sevens

==== Most appearances ====
1. Rowan Varty – 47
2. Carl Murray – 39
3. Ricky Cheuk – 39
4. Andrew Chambers – 38
5. Jamie Hood – 37

==== Most points ====
1. Carl Murray – 139
2. Keith Robertson – 135
3. Rowan Varty – 105
4. Matthew Reede – 90
5. Ricky Cheuk – 75

==== Most tries ====
1. Rowan Varty – 21
2. Matthew Reede – 18
3. Keith Robertson – 15
4. Ricky Cheuk – 15
5. Tom McQueen – 13

==== Most conversions ====
1. Jamie Hood - 34
2. Carl Murray – 30
3. Keith Robertson – 25
4. Russell Webb – 17
5. Nigel D'Acre – 16

==== Most tackles ====
1. Jamie Hood – 59
2. Max Woodward – 42
3. Liam Herbert – 32
4. Cado Lee – 30
5. Michael Coverdale – 28

== Honours ==
- 2012, 2014, 2016, 2021, 2022, 2023, 2024, 2025 Asia Rugby Sevens Series Champions
- 2011, 2013, 2015, 2017, 2018 Asia Rugby Sevens Series Runners-Up
- 2018 Asian Games, 2022 Asian Games, 2026 Asian Games Gold Medals
- 2010 Asian Games, 2014 Asian Games Silver Medals
- 2009 East Asian Games Silver Medal
- 2025 China National Games Gold Medal
- 2013 China National Games Silver Medal

== See also ==
- Hong Kong Sevens
