= Philippines national rugby sevens team =

Philippines
- Union: Philippine Rugby Football Union
- Nickname: Volcanoes
- Coach: Josh Sutcliffe
| Team kit | Change kit |

First international
- Philippines 32–5 Indonesia (Manila, Philippines; December 3, 2005)

Largest win
- Philippines 67–0 Nepal (Doha, Qatar; March 3, 2017)

Largest defeat
- Japan 50–0 Philippines (Moscow, Russia; June 30, 2013)

World Cup Sevens
- Appearances: 1 (First in 2013)
- Best result: Bowl quarterfinals (2013)

The Philippines national rugby sevens team represents the Philippines in international rugby sevens tournament. It is organized by the Philippine Rugby Football Union.

== History ==
Rugby sevens was a demonstration sport at the 2005 SEA Games in the Philippines. The Philippines fielded its first ever rugby sevens national team and defeated Indonesia 32–5 for the gold medal.

The Philippines qualified for their first and only Rugby World Cup Sevens in the 2013 edition in Moscow.

== Tournament history ==
=== Rugby World Cup Sevens ===
World Cup record
| Year | Round | Position | Pld | W | L | D |
|---|---|---|---|---|---|---|
| (Scotland) 1993 | Did Not Enter | | | | | |
| (Hong Kong) 1997 | Did Not Enter | | | | | |
| (Argentina) 2001 | Did Not Enter | | | | | |
| (Hong Kong) 2005 | Did Not Enter | | | | | |
| (United Arab Emirates) 2009 | Did Not Enter | | | | | |
| (Russia) 2013 | Bowl Quarterfinals | 24th | 4 | 0 | 4 | 0 |
| (United States) 2018 | did not qualify | | | | | |
| Total | 0 Title | | 4 | 0 | 4 | 0 |

=== Asian Games ===
Asian Games record
| Year | Round | Position | Pld | W | L | D |
|---|---|---|---|---|---|---|
| (Thailand) 1998 | did not enter | | | | | |
| (South Korea) 2002 | did not enter | | | | | |
| (Qatar) 2006 | did not enter | | | | | |
| (China) 2010 | did not enter | | | | | |
| (South Korea) 2014 | Classification round | 5 | 6 | 3 | 3 | 0 |
| (Indonesia) 2018 | did not enter | | | | | |
| (China) 2022 | Classification round | 9 | 6 | 3 | 3 | 0 |
| (Japan) 2026 | to be determined | | | | | |
| Total | No Title | 2/7 | 12 | 6 | 6 | 0 |

=== SEA Games ===
SEA Games record
| Year | Round | Position | Pld | W | L | D |
|---|---|---|---|---|---|---|
| (Thailand) 2007 | Final | 1st place, gold medalist(s) | 7 | 4 | 3 | 0 |
| (Singapore) 2015 | Final | 1st place, gold medalist(s) | 6 | 6 | 0 | 0 |
| (Malaysia) 2017 | Final | 4 | 6 | 2 | 4 | 0 |
| (Philippines) 2019 | Final | 1st place, gold medalist(s) | 6 | 6 | 0 | 0 |
| (Thailand) 2025 | Third playoff | 3rd place, bronze medalist(s) | 5 | 3 | 2 | 0 |
| Total | 4 Titles | 3/5 | 30 | 21 | 9 | 0 |

== Players ==
=== Current team ===
The following is the squad for the 2022 Asian Games.

Head coach: (New Zealand) Darryl Suasua

| No. | Pos. | Player | Age |
|---|---|---|---|
| 1 | FW | Tommy Kalaw Gilbert | 27 |
| 2 | BK | Kai Ledesma Stroem | 25 |
| 3 | FW | Donald Coleman | 25 |
| 4 | BK | Joe Palabay Dawson | 33 |
| 5 | BK | Luc Villalba Smith | 22 |
| 7 | BK | Jerome Rudder | 25 |
| 8 | BK | Vincent Amar Young | 29 |
| 9 | FW | Barberis Raphael | 22 |
| 10 | FW | Robert Luceno Fogerty | 26 |
| 11 | BK | Nicholas Gaffud Robertson | 26 |
| 12 | FW | Justin Coveney | 38 |
| 14 | FW | Rafael Julian Phillips | 21 |

=== Other notable players ===
- Andrew Wolff
- Gareth Holgate
- Matthew Saunders
- Andrew Everingham
- Oliver Saunders
- Michael Letts

== Coaches ==
- (Australia) Rick Hartley (2006–2009)
- (United States) Al Caravelli (2012–2013)
- (Australia) Matthew Cullen (2013–2014)
- (New Zealand) Geoff Alley (2014–2015)
- (New Zealand) Frano Botica (2016–?)
- (Australia) Josh Sutcliffe (2021–?)
- (New Zealand) Darryl Suasua (2023–)
