= United Arab Emirates national rugby sevens team =

United Arab Emirates Sevens
- Union: UAE Rugby Association
- Coach: Apollo Perelini
- Captain: Niall Statham

First international
- 2015 Asia Rugby Sevens Series

World Cup Sevens
- Appearances: 0

The United Arab Emirates Sevens team is new to the sevens scene. They previously formed the Arabian Gulf sevens team along with Bahrain, Kuwait, Oman, Qatar, Saudi Arabia as part of the Arabian Gulf Rugby Football Union before the IRB disbanded the union.

The 2011 Dubai Sevens will be their debut as a national team.

== Current squad ==
12 Men squad to 2011 Dubai Sevens:

- Tim Fletcher
- Murray Strang
- Shane Rutherford
- Brad Barker
- Adam V Robinson
- Emad Reyal
- Mohammed Rahma
- Sean Hurley
- Chris Gregory
- Steve Smith
- Cyrus Homayoun
- Stefan Imbert
- David Matasio

2015-2016 Men's Squad:

- Niall Statham
- Andrew Carphin
- Christopher Marshall
- Munier Kenny
- Ryno Fourie
- Devante Steele
- Imad Reyal
- Charlie Sargent
- Hassan Al Noobi
- Ian Overton
- Mohammad Hassan
- Adel Al Hendi
- Jerry Baleilautoka
- Tuharangi Kahukuranui

== Results ==
=== 2011 ===
2011 Dubai Sevens

Pool Games
| Samoa | 55 – 12 | United Arab Emirates |
| Fiji | 43 – 0 | United Arab Emirates |
| Argentina | 73 – 7 | United Arab Emirates |

1/4 final Bowl
| Scotland | 40 – 5 | United Arab Emirates |
