= Singapore national rugby sevens team =

The Singapore national rugby sevens team is a minor national sevens side. They have competed in the Hong Kong Sevens many times, and were the host team in the former Singapore Sevens.

In 2015, the team won the SEA Games' bronze medal.

== Summaries ==
| Year | Venue | Cup | | | Plate | |
| Year | Venue | Winner | Final Score | Runner-up | Winner | Runner-up |
|---|---|---|---|---|---|---|
| 1978; Details | HK Football Club Stadium | Fiji | 14-10 | Manawatu | Bahrain | Singapore |
| 1980; Details | HK Football Club Stadium | Fiji | 12-8 | Co-Optimists | Japan | Singapore |
