= Denmark national rugby sevens team =

The Denmark national rugby sevens team is a minor national sevens side. They compete annually in the Rugby Europe Sevens Trophy tournaments.

== Tournament results ==
=== Sri Lankan Rugby 7s ===
Year	Cup	Plate	Bowl
1999	South Korea	Malaysia	India
2000	Chinese Taipei	Japan	Thailand
2001	Chinese Taipei	Denmark	Czech Republic
2002	Portugal	South Korea	Hong Kong
2003	Kenya	Sri Lanka	Arabian Gulf
2004	Japan	Sri Lanka	Kazakhstan
2005	Japan	Sri Lanka	Arabian Gulf
2006	South Korea	Thailand	Malaysia
2007	Hong Kong	China	India
2008	Did not compete		
