= 2015 Asian Sevens Series =

- Hosts: China; Thailand; Sri Lanka
- Date: 5 September – 11 October 2015
- Nations: 12

Final positions
- Champions: Japan
- Runners-up: Hong Kong
- Third: South Korea

Series details
- Top try scorer: (Japan) Goto, Teruya (22)
- Top point scorer: (Japan) Goto, Teruya

The 2015 Asian Sevens Series was the seventh Asian Sevens Series held by Asia Rugby. The winner and runner-up of the competition gaining entry into the World Series qualifying tournament (to become a core team in 2017) at the 2016 Hong Kong Sevens.

The first leg of the 2015 Asian Sevens Series was held at the Tiantai Stadium in Qingdao on 5 and 6 September. The biggest surprise of that tournament was that for the first time since 2011 Hong Kong failed to make the finals, losing in the quarterfinals to the Chinese, 21–17. The Chinese were successful in the semi-finals defeating Sri Lanka 22–12 garnering their first cup final appearance against Japan, who defeated South Korea by 21–5 in their semi-final. The Japanese went on to win the Cup final by defeating the Chinese by 28–12. In the Plate final Hong Kong defeated Kazakhstan 27–0 and in the Bowl final UAE were successful against Singapore 15–7.

The second leg of the series was held in Thailand on 26 and 27 September. In this leg Japan, and South Korea, successfully made their way through the competition unbeaten. Japan coming from behind to win a tense encounter 24–19, against Hong Kong in the semi-final, scoring a golden try in sudden death extra-time. Japan then repeated their earlier result in Shanghai, easily winning the Cup 45–7 against South Korea. The Plate final was contested between UAE and China, with China securing the Plate with a 26–5 victory, whilst in the Bowl final Thailand defeated the Philippines 24–19.

The last leg was held at the Colombo Racecourse in Sri Lanka on 10 and 11 October. Japan booked their berth in the Cup final with a 31–5 victory over China in the quarter-final and a hard-fought 26–19 win over hosts Sri Lanka in the semi-final. Hong Kong beat Chinese Taipei 33–5 in their quarter-final before hammering Malaysia 38–7 in the semi-finals. Hong Kong’s path to the final was made easier by the shock loss of South Korea to Thailand in the preliminary rounds. Japan secured a clean sweep of the series winning their third Cup by defeating Hong Kong 29–22. South Korea won the Plate final, with a 17–10 victory over Chinese Taipei.

The winner of the 2015 Asian Sevens Series was Japan, who won all three legs, the remaining places on the podium went to Hong Kong and South Korea, with their final position determined by the difference of points.

== Teams ==
12 teams competed in the tournament.

- Japan
- Hong Kong
- South Korea
- Sri Lanka
- China
- Malaysia
- United Arab Emirates
- Singapore
- Thailand
- Philippines
- Kazakhstan
- Taiwan

== Tour venues ==
2015 Venues
Leg	City	Dates	Cup	Plate	Bowl
China	Qingdao	5–6 September 2015	Japan	Hong Kong	United Arab Emirates
Thailand	Bangkok	26–27 September 2015	Japan	United Arab Emirates	Philippines
Colombo	Colombo	10–11 October 2015	Japan	South Korea	United Arab Emirates

== China ==
The China 7s was held in Qingdao from September 5-6.

=== Pool stages ===
Pool A

Teams	P	W	D	L
Hong Kong	2	2	0	0
Philippines	2	1	0	1
United Arab Emirates	2	0	0	2

Philippines	20-0	United Arab Emirates

Hong Kong	24-0	United Arab Emirates

Hong Kong	45-0	Philippines

Pool B

Teams	P	W	D	L
Sri Lanka	2	2	0	0
Kazakhstan	2	1	0	1
Singapore	2	0	0	2

Singapore	7-22	Kazakhstan

Sri Lanka	24-12	Kazakhstan

Sri Lanka	43-0	Singapore

Pool C

Teams	P	W	D	L
Japan	2	2	0	0
China	2	1	0	1
Taiwan	2	0	0	2

China	7-21	Japan

Japan	50-0	Taiwan

Taiwan	5-37	China

Pool D

Teams	P	W	D	L
South Korea	2	2	0	0
Malaysia	2	1	0	1
Thailand	2	0	0	2

Thailand	12-26	Malaysia

South Korea	27-7	Malaysia

South Korea	40-0	Thailand

=== Knockout stages ===
Bowl

Semi-finals
United Arab Emirates	24
Taiwan	12
Singapore	24
Thailand	19

9th-place final
United Arab Emirates	15
Singapore	7
11th Place
Thailand	21
Taiwan	7

Plate

Semi-finals
Hong Kong	29
Malaysia	0
Kazakhstan	19
Philippines	5

5th-place final
Hong Kong	27
Kazakhstan	0
7th Place
Philippines	19
Malaysia	17

Cup

Quarter-finals
Sri Lanka	31
Malaysia	0
China	21
Hong Kong	17
South Korea	19
Kazakhstan	17
Japan	26
Philippines	5

Semi-finals
China	22
Sri Lanka	12
Japan	21
South Korea	5

Final
Japan	28
China	12
Third place
South Korea	24
Sri Lanka	7

== Thailand ==
The Thailand 7s was held in Bangkok September 26-27.

=== Pool stages ===
Pool A

Teams	P	W	D	L
Japan	2	2	0	0
Kazakhstan	2	1	0	1
Singapore	2	0	0	2

Kazakhstan	14-9	Singapore

Japan	33-5	Singapore

Japan	54-0	Kazakhstan

Pool B

Teams	P	W	D	L
Hong Kong	2	2	0	0
Sri Lanka	2	1	0	1
Taiwan	2	0	0	2

Hong Kong	34-0	Taiwan

Sri Lanka	36-0	Taiwan

Sri Lanka	14-33	Hong Kong

Pool C

Teams	P	W	D	L
South Korea	2	2	0	0
United Arab Emirates	2	1	0	1
Philippines	2	0	0	2

Philippines	7-12	United Arab Emirates

South Korea	33-10	United Arab Emirates

South Korea	42-7	Philippines

Pool D

Teams	P	W	D	L
China	2	2	0	0
Malaysia	2	1	0	1
Thailand	2	0	0	2

Malaysia	21-15	Thailand

China	31-5	Thailand

China	42-5	Malaysia

=== Knockout stages ===
Bowl

Semi-finals
Philippines	21
Kazakhstan	12
Thailand	17
Taiwan	7

9th-place final
Thailand	24
Philippines	19
11th Place
Kazakhstan	15
Taiwan	12

Plate

Semi-finals
United Arab Emirates	27
Malaysia	14
China	26
Singapore	7

5th-place final
China	26
United Arab Emirates	5
7th Place
Singapore	21
Malaysia	19

Cup

Quarter-finals
Hong Kong	33
Malaysia	0
Japan	39
United Arab Emirates	0
Sri Lanka	14
China	7
South Korea	17
Singapore	0

Semi-finals
Japan	24
Hong Kong	19
South Korea	27
Sri Lanka	0

Cup Final
Japan	45
South Korea	7
3rd Place
Hong Kong	33
Sri Lanka	7

== Sri Lanka ==
The Sri Lanka 7s was held in Colombo from October 10-11. Kazakhstan withdrew from the tournament leaving only Hong Kong and China in pool C.

=== Pool stages ===
Pool A

Teams	P	W	D	L
Japan	2	2	0	0
Taiwan	2	1	0	1
United Arab Emirates	2	0	0	2

United Arab Emirates	14-19	Taiwan

Japan	35-7	Taiwan

Japan	36-7	United Arab Emirates

Pool B

Teams	P	W	D	L
Sri Lanka	2	2	0	0
Malaysia	2	1	0	1
Philippines	2	0	0	2

Malaysia	21-19	Philippines

Sri Lanka	38-7	Philippines

Sri Lanka	40-0	Malaysia

Pool C

Teams	P	W	D	L
Hong Kong	2	2	0	0
China	2	0	0	2

Hong Kong	29-14	China

China	0-24	Hong Kong

Pool D

Teams	P	W	D	L
Thailand	2	2	0	0
South Korea	2	1	0	1
Singapore	2	0	0	2

Singapore	0-22	Thailand

South Korea	14-21	Thailand

South Korea	19-0	Singapore

=== Knockout stages ===
Bottom 3 playoff

United Arab Emirates	19-12	Philippines

Philippines	19-21	Singapore

United Arab Emirates	29-0	Singapore

- United Arab Emirates - 9th
- Singapore - 10th
- Philippines - 11th

Plate

Semi-finals
South Korea	7
China	5
Taiwan	21
Thailand	0

5th-place final
South Korea	17
Taiwan	10
7th Place
China	26
Thailand	19

Cup

Quarter-finals
Sri Lanka	19
South Korea	12
Japan	31
China	5
Malaysia	43
Thailand	0
Hong Kong	33
Taiwan	5

Semi-finals
Japan	26
Sri Lanka	19
Hong Kong	38
Malaysia	7

Cup Final
Japan	29
Hong Kong	22
3rd Place
Sri Lanka	45
Malaysia	12

== Final standings ==
2015 Standings
Pos.	Country	China	Thailand	Sri Lanka	Overall
1st place, gold medalist(s)	Japan	12	12	12	36
2nd place, silver medalist(s)	Hong Kong	8	10	11	29
3rd place, bronze medalist(s)	South Korea	10	11	8	29
4	Sri Lanka	9	9	10	28
5	China	11	8	6	25
6	Malaysia	5	5	9	19
7	United Arab Emirates	4	7	4	15
8	Singapore	3	6	3	12
9	Thailand	2	4	5	11
10	Philippines	6	3	2	11
11	Kazakhstan	7	2	-	9
12	Chinese Taipei	1	1	7	9
