= 2010 Carlton Rugby 7s =

Tournament details
- Tournament format(s): Knockout
- Date: 27–28 November 2010

Tournament statistics
- Teams: 16
- Matches played: 44

Final
- Champions: Fiji Barbarians
- Runners-up: Spain

The 2010 Carlton Rugby 7s was the second year of the Carlton Rugby 's tournament. Fiji Barbarians defeated Spain 36 - 07 in the final of the Cup.

== Group stage ==
Key to colours in group tables
Teams advanced to the Cup quarter-final
Teams advanced to the Plate semi-final
Teams advanced to the Bowl semi-final

=== Pool A ===
- Fiji Barbarians 12–12 Spain
- South Korea 19–7 Malaysia
- Fiji Barbarians 42–0 Malaysia
- Spain 43–0 South Korea
- Fiji Barbarians 52–5 South Korea
- Spain 29–0 Malaysia

Teams	Pld	W	D	L	PF	PA	+/−	Pts
Fiji Barbarians	3	2	1	0	106	17	+86	8
Spain	3	2	1	0	84	12	+72	8
South Korea	3	1	0	2	24	102	−78	5
Malaysia	3	0	0	3	7	90	−83	3

=== Pool B ===
- Australia Legends 26–7 Kenya Shujaa
- Germany 35–14 Taiwan
- Kenya Shujaa 26–5 Taiwan
- Australia Legends 28–0 Germany
- Kenya Shujaa 10–5 Germany
- Australia Legends 45–0 Taiwan

Teams	Pld	W	D	L	PF	PA	+/−	Pts
Australia Legends	3	3	0	0	99	7	+92	9
Kenya Shujaa	3	2	0	1	43	36	+7	7
Germany	3	1	0	2	40	52	−12	5
Taiwan	3	0	0	3	19	106	−137	3

=== Pool C ===
- Samoa Barbarians 31–15 Japan
- Kazakhstan 21–7 (Cooperation Council for the Arab States of the Gulf) Arabian Gulf
- Samoa Barbarians 59–0 Kazakhstan
- Japan 29–28 (Cooperation Council for the Arab States of the Gulf) Arabian Gulf
- Samoa Barbarians 31–5 (Cooperation Council for the Arab States of the Gulf) Arabian Gulf
- Japan 10–7 Kazakhstan

Teams	Pld	W	D	L	PF	PA	+/−	Pts
Samoa Barbarians	3	3	0	0	121	20	+101	9
Japan	3	2	0	1	54	66	−12	7
Kazakhstan	3	1	0	2	28	73	−45	5
(Cooperation Council for the Arab States of the Gulf) Arabian Gulf	3	0	0	3	40	81	−41	3

=== Pool D ===
- South Africa Vipers 12–5 New Zealand Legends
- China 26–19 Sri Lanka
- New Zealand Legends 52–5 Sri Lanka
- South Africa Vipers 22–7 China
- New Zealand Legends 36–0 China
- South Africa Vipers 33–19 Sri Lanka

Teams	Pld	W	D	L	PF	PA	+/−	Pts
South Africa Vipers	3	3	0	0	67	31	+36	9
New Zealand Legends	3	2	0	1	93	17	+76	7
China	3	1	0	2	33	77	−44	5
Sri Lanka	3	0	0	3	43	111	−68	3

== Second round ==
=== Bowl ===
Quarter-finals
South Korea	19
Taiwan	15
China	17
(Cooperation Council for the Arab States of the Gulf) Arabian Gulf	12
Kazakhstan	27
Sri Lanka	7
Germany	43
Malaysia	0

Semi-finals
South Korea	0
China	35
Kazakhstan	0
Germany	21

Final
China	10
Germany	21

=== Shield ===
Semi-finals
(Cooperation Council for the Arab States of the Gulf) Arabian Gulf	33
Taiwan	14
Sri Lanka	31
Malaysia	7

Final
Arabian Gulf	19
Sri Lanka	31

=== Cup ===
Quarter-finals
South Africa Vipers	47
Japan	0
Fiji Barbarians	22
Kenya Shujaa	10
Samoa Barbarians	21
New Zealand Legends	7
Spain	21
Australia Legends	7

Semi-finals
South Africa Vipers	19
Fiji Barbarians	28
Samoa Barbarians	14
Spain	17

Final
Fiji Barbarians	36
Spain	7

=== Plate ===
Semi-finals
Japan	15
Kenya Shujaa	7
New Zealand Legends	24
Australia Legends	12

Final
Japan	7
New Zealand Legends	31
