= 2009 Carlton Rugby 7s =

Tournament details
- Countries: 12
- Tournament format(s): Knockout
- Date: 27–29 November 2009

Tournament statistics
- Teams: 12
- Matches played: 25

Final
- Venue: Sugathadasa Stadium, Colombo
- Champions: Japan
- Runners-up: Malaysia

The 2009 Carlton Rugby 7s, had previously been conducted as the Singer Sri Lankan Airlines Rugby 7s competition but was rebranded as the Carlton Sri Lanka Rugby 7s under a new partnership between the Tharunyata Hetak Foundation and the Sri Lanka Rugby Football Union (SLRFU). The tournament was the sixth and final leg of the Asian Sevens Series for the year.

The Carlton 7s were held on 27–29 November 2008 at Sugathadasa Stadium in Colombo, involving 12 teams from the Asian rugby playing nations of Japan, South Korea, Kazakhstan, Chinese Taipei, China, Thailand, Iran, Jordan, Brunei, Pakistan and Malaysia, together with the host nation, Sri Lanka. In the Cup final Japan defeated Malaysia 26 points to 7, with Thailand winning the Plate and Pakistan the Bowl.

There was also a separate championship for six invited international teams, in addition to the annual schools tournament. The schools event was won by St Peter’s College, who defeated Royal College 17 points to 14. In the final of the Invitational International tournament, Fiji, who fielded the Fiji Dijicel were victorious over the South African Vipers, 38 points to 12. In the third place play-off the Western Samoa Barbarians beat the New Zealand Legends by 14-5 whilst the Australian Legends recorded a 24–5 win over Papua New Guinea in the fifth place play-off.

== First round ==
Key to colours in group tables
| Teams advanced to the Cup quarter-final |
| Teams advanced to the Bowl semi-final |

=== Pool A ===
- Japan 40–0 Kazakhstan
- Kazakhstan 15–7 Iran
- Japan 33–0 Iran

| Teams | Pld | W | D | L | PF | PA | +/− | Pts |
|---|---|---|---|---|---|---|---|---|
| Japan | 2 | 2 | 0 | 0 | 73 | 0 | +73 | 6 |
| Kazakhstan | 2 | 1 | 0 | 1 | 15 | 47 | −32 | 4 |
| Iran | 2 | 0 | 0 | 2 | 7 | 48 | −41 | 2 |

=== Pool B ===
- Chinese Taipei 31–14 Thailand
- Thailand 45–0 Jordan
- Chinese Taipei 31–0 Jordan

| Teams | Pld | W | D | L | PF | PA | +/− | Pts |
|---|---|---|---|---|---|---|---|---|
| Chinese Taipei | 2 | 2 | 0 | 0 | 62 | 14 | +48 | 6 |
| Thailand | 2 | 1 | 0 | 1 | 59 | 31 | +28 | 4 |
| Philippines | 2 | 0 | 0 | 2 | 0 | 76 | −76 | 2 |

=== Pool C ===
- Malaysia 35–5 China
- Malaysia 43–0 Brunei
- China 41–0 Brunei

| Teams | Pld | W | D | L | PF | PA | +/− | Pts |
|---|---|---|---|---|---|---|---|---|
| Malaysia | 2 | 2 | 0 | 0 | 78 | 5 | +73 | 6 |
| China | 2 | 1 | 0 | 1 | 46 | 35 | +11 | 4 |
| Brunei | 2 | 0 | 0 | 2 | 0 | 84 | −84 | 3 |

=== Pool D ===
- Sri Lanka 22–12 South Korea
- Sri Lanka 52–0 Pakistan
- South Korea 24–0 Pakistan

| Teams | Pld | W | D | L | PF | PA | +/− | Pts |
|---|---|---|---|---|---|---|---|---|
| Sri Lanka | 2 | 2 | 0 | 0 | 74 | 12 | +62 | 6 |
| South Korea | 2 | 1 | 0 | 1 | 36 | 22 | +14 | 4 |
| Pakistan | 2 | 0 | 0 | 2 | 0 | 76 | −76 | 2 |

== Second round ==
=== Bowl ===
Semi-finals
Brunei | 21
Jordan | 5
Pakistan | 19
Iran | 17

Final
Brunei | 7
Pakistan | 26

=== Plate ===
Semi-finals
Thailand | 28
Sri Lanka | 12
South Korea | 17
China | 10

Final
Thailand | 15
South Korea | 12

=== Cup ===
Quarter-finals
Malaysia | 29
Thailand | 14
Kazakhstan | 17
Sri Lanka | 12
Chinese Taipei | 21
China | 17
Japan | 35
South Korea | 7

Semi-finals
Malaysia | 19
Kazakhstan | 0
Chinese Taipei | 5
Japan | 40

Final
Malaysia | 7
Japan | 26
