= 2015 Colombo Sevens =

- Host nation: Sri Lanka
- Date: 10–11 October 2015

Cup
- Champion: Japan
- Runner-up: Hong Kong
- Third: Sri Lanka

Plate
- Winner: South Korea
- Runner-up: Chinese Taipei

Bowl
- Winner: United Arab Emirates

Tournament details
- Matches played: 26
- Tries scored: 133 (average 5.12 per match)
- Most points: (Japan) Sakai, Katsuyuki
- Most tries: (Sri Lanka) Ranjan, Danushka (Japan) Goto, Teruya

The 2015 Colombo Sevens was the third and final leg of the Asian Sevens Series for the year.

== Main draw ==
=== Pool Stage ===
==== Pool A ====
Teams	Pld	W	D	L	PF	PA	+/−	Pts
Japan	2	2	0	0	14	71	+57	6
Chinese Taipei	2	1	0	1	49	26	-23	4
United Arab Emirates	2	0	0	2	55	21	−34	2

10 October 2015
11:58

United Arab Emirates	9–14	Chinese Taipei

Colombo Racecourse, Colombo

10 October 2015
15:00

Japan	35–7	Chinese Taipei

Colombo Racecourse, Colombo

10 October 2015
17:56

Japan	36–7	United Arab Emirates

Colombo Racecourse, Colombo

==== Pool B ====
Teams	Pld	W	D	L	PF	PA	+/−	Pts
Sri Lanka	2	2	0	0	7	78	+71	6
Malaysia	2	1	0	1	59	21	-38	4
Philippines	2	0	0	2	59	26	−33	2

10 October 2015
12:20

Malaysia	21–9	Philippines

Colombo Racecourse, Colombo

10 October 2015
15:22

Sri Lanka	38–7	Philippines

Colombo Racecourse, Colombo

10 October 2015
18:18

Sri Lanka	40–0	Malaysia

Colombo Racecourse, Colombo

==== Pool C ====
Teams	Pld	W	D	L	PF	PA	+/−	Pts
Hong Kong	2	2	0	0	14	53	+39	6
China	2	0	0	2	53	14	-39	2

10 October 2015
15:44

Hong Kong	29–14	China

Colombo Racecourse, Colombo

10 October 2015
18:40

China	0–24	Hong Kong

Colombo Racecourse, Colombo

==== Pool D ====
Teams	Pld	W	D	L	PF	PA	+/−	Pts
Thailand	2	2	0	0	14	43	+29	6
South Korea	2	1	0	1	21	33	+12	4
Singapore	2	0	0	2	41	0	−41	2

10 October 2015
12:42

Singapore	0–22	Thailand

Colombo Racecourse, Colombo

10 October 2015
16:06

South Korea	14–21	Thailand

Colombo Racecourse, Colombo

10 October 2015
19:02

South Korea	19–0	Singapore

Colombo Racecourse, Colombo

== Finals ==
=== Bottom Three playoffs ===
11 October 2015
9:30

United Arab Emirates	19–12	Philippines

Colombo Racecourse, Colombo

11 October 2015
12:48

Philippines	19–21	Singapore

Colombo Racecourse, Colombo

11 October 2015
15:56

United Arab Emirates	29–0	Singapore

Colombo Racecourse, Colombo

=== Plate ===
Semi-finals
11 October 2015 – 15:00 – Colombo Racecourse
South Korea	5
China	7
11 October 2015 – 15:22 – Colombo Racecourse
Thailand	0
Chinese Taipei	21

Final
11 October 2015 – 17:24 – Colombo Racecourse
South Korea	17
Chinese Taipei	10
Third place
11 October 2015 - 17:02 - Colombo Racecourse
China	26
Thailand	19

=== Cup ===
Quarter-finals
11 October 2015 – 11:20 – Colombo Racecourse
South Korea	12
Sri Lanka	19
11 October 2015 – 11:42 – Colombo Racecourse
Japan	31
China	5
11 October 2015 – 12:04 – Colombo Racecourse
Malaysia	43
Thailand	-
11 October 2015 – 12:26 – Colombo Racecourse
Hong Kong	33
Chinese Taipei	5

Semi-finals
11 October 2015 – 15:22 – Colombo Racecourse
Sri Lanka	19
Japan	26
11 October 2015 – 15:34 – Colombo Racecourse
Malaysia	7
Hong Kong	38

Final
11 October 2015 – 19:15 – Colombo Racecourse
Japan	29
Hong Kong	22
Third place
11 October 2015 - 18:08 - Colombo Racecourse
Sri Lanka	45
Malaysia	12

== Standings ==
Pos.	Country	Points
1	Japan	12
2	Hong Kong	11
3	Sri Lanka	10
4	Malaysia	9
5	South Korea	8
6	Chinese Taipei	7
7	China	6
8	Thailand	5
9	United Arab Emirates	4
10	Singapore	3
11	Philippines	2
