= 2024 Asia Rugby Sevens Series =

- Hosts: South Korea; China; Thailand
- Date: 7 September–10 November 2024
- Nations: 8

Final positions
- Champions: Hong Kong
- Runners-up: Japan
- Third: China

The 2024 Asia Rugby Sevens Series is the fifteenth edition of the series. It is played over three legs in South Korea, China and Thailand.

== Teams ==
Eight teams featured in the series:

- China
- Hong Kong
- Japan
- Malaysia
- Singapore
- South Korea
- Thailand
- United Arab Emirates

== Tour venues ==
The official schedule for the 2024 Asia Rugby Sevens Series is:

Leg	Stadium	City	Dates	Winner
South Korea	Namdong Asiad Rugby Stadium	Incheon	7–8 September 2024	Hong Kong
China	Hangzhou Normal University	Hangzhou	21–22 September 2024	Hong Kong
Thailand	Boonyachinda Stadium	Bangkok	9–10 November 2024	Hong Kong

== Standings ==
2024 Asia Rugby Sevens Series
Pos	Event Team	Incheon	Hangzhou	Bangkok	Points total
1	Hong Kong	12	12	12	36
2	Japan	8	10	10	28
3	China	10	8	8	26
4	South Korea	7	7	7	21
5	Thailand	5	2	5	12
6	Malaysia	4	5	2	11
7	United Arab Emirates	2	4	4	10
8	Singapore	1	1	1	3

Legend
Blue fill	Entry to World Challenger Series
Red fill	Relegated to 2025 Trophy

== Incheon ==
=== Pool A ===
Team	W	D	L	PF	PA	PD	Pts
China	3	0	0	116	12	+104	9
Japan	2	0	1	62	40	+22	7
Thailand	1	0	2	20	76	–56	5
Malaysia	0	0	3	7	77	–70	3

7 September
10:00

China	41–0	Malaysia

Namdong Asiad Rugby Stadium, Incheon

7 September
10:25

Japan	29–5	Thailand

Namdong Asiad Rugby Stadium, Incheon

7 September
13:20

China	40–0	Thailand

Namdong Asiad Rugby Stadium, Incheon

7 September
13:45

Japan	21–0	Malaysia

Namdong Asiad Rugby Stadium, Incheon

7 September
16:40

Malaysia	7–15	Thailand

Namdong Asiad Rugby Stadium, Incheon

7 September
17:05

Japan	12–35	China

Namdong Asiad Rugby Stadium, Incheon

=== Pool B ===
Team	W	D	L	PF	PA	PD	Pts
Hong Kong	3	0	0	108	7	+101	9
South Korea	2	0	1	44	48	–4	7
Singapore	1	0	2	24	85	–61	5
United Arab Emirates	0	0	3	31	67	–36	3

7 September
10:50

United Arab Emirates	12–17	South Korea

Namdong Asiad Rugby Stadium, Incheon

7 September
11:15

Hong Kong	46–0	Singapore

Namdong Asiad Rugby Stadium, Incheon

7 September
14:10

United Arab Emirates	12–14	Singapore

Namdong Asiad Rugby Stadium, Incheon

7 September
14:35

Hong Kong	26–0	South Korea

Namdong Asiad Rugby Stadium, Incheon

7 September
17:30

South Korea	27–10	Singapore

Namdong Asiad Rugby Stadium, Incheon

7 September
17:55

Hong Kong	36–7	United Arab Emirates

Namdong Asiad Rugby Stadium, Incheon

=== Plate ===
Plate semifinals
8 September – 10:00
Thailand	17
United Arab Emirates	14
8 September – 10:25
Malaysia	10
Singapore	0

Plate final
8 September – 13:45
Thailand	22
Malaysia	5
7th place final
8 September – 13:20
United Arab Emirates	19
Singapore	14

=== Cup ===
Cup semifinals
8 September – 10:50
China	14
South Korea	5
8 September – 11:15
Japan	12
Hong Kong	24

Cup final
8 September – 15:50
China	7
Hong Kong	40
3rd place final
8 September – 15:00
South Korea	12
Japan	17

== Hangzhou ==
=== Pool A ===
Team	W	D	L	PF	PA	PD	Pts
Hong Kong	3	0	0	110	0	+110	9
South Korea	1	0	2	31	53	–22	5
Singapore	1	0	2	40	67	–27	5
Thailand	1	0	2	17	78	–67	5

21 September
10:00

South Korea	19–0	Thailand

Hangzhou Normal University, Hangzhou

21 September
10:25

Hong Kong	38–0	Singapore

Hangzhou Normal University, Hangzhou

21 September
13:20

South Korea	12–26	Singapore

Hangzhou Normal University, Hangzhou

21 September
13:45

Hong Kong	45–0	Thailand

Hangzhou Normal University, Hangzhou

21 September
16:04

Thailand	17–14	Singapore

Hangzhou Normal University, Hangzhou

21 September
17:05

Hong Kong	27–0	South Korea

Hangzhou Normal University, Hangzhou

=== Pool B ===
Team	W	D	L	PF	PA	PD	Pts
Japan	3	0	0	90	45	+45	9
China	2	0	1	80	33	+47	7
United Arab Emirates	1	0	2	48	62	–14	5
Malaysia	0	0	3	19	97	–78	3

21 September
10:50

Japan	40–12	Malaysia

Hangzhou Normal University, Hangzhou

21 September
11:15

China	26–12	United Arab Emirates

Hangzhou Normal University, Hangzhou

21 September
14:10

Japan	29–14	United Arab Emirates

Hangzhou Normal University, Hangzhou

21 September
14:35

China	35–0	Malaysia

Hangzhou Normal University, Hangzhou

21 September
17:30

Malaysia	7–22	United Arab Emirates

Hangzhou Normal University, Hangzhou

21 September
17:55

China	19–21	Japan

Hangzhou Normal University, Hangzhou

=== Plate ===
Plate semifinals
22 September – 10:00
Singapore	10
Malaysia	24
22 September – 10:25
Thailand	10
United Arab Emirates	14

Plate final
22 September – 13:45
Malaysia	17
United Arab Emirates	12
7th place final
22 September – 13:20
Singapore	12
Thailand	27

=== Cup ===
Cup semifinals
22 September – 10:50
Hong Kong	29
China	7
22 September – 11:15
South Korea	12
Japan	35

Cup final
22 September – 15:50
Hong Kong	24
Japan	19
3rd place final
22 September – 15:00
China	38
South Korea	0

== Bangkok ==
=== Pool A ===
Team	W	D	L	PF	PA	PD	Pts
Hong Kong	3	0	0	121	7	+114	9
South Korea	1	1	1	33	81	–48	6
Malaysia	1	0	2	32	61	–29	5
Singapore	0	1	2	28	65	–37	4

9 November
10:00

South Korea	12–10	Malaysia

Boonyachinda Stadium, Bangkok

9 November
10:25

Hong Kong	22–7	Singapore

Boonyachinda Stadium, Bangkok

9 November
13:20

South Korea	21–21	Singapore

Boonyachinda Stadium, Bangkok

9 November
13:45

Hong Kong	49–0	Malaysia

Boonyachinda Stadium, Bangkok

9 November
16:40

Malaysia	22–0	Singapore

Boonyachinda Stadium, Bangkok

9 November
17:05

Hong Kong	50–0	South Korea

Boonyachinda Stadium, Bangkok

=== Pool B ===
Team	W	D	L	PF	PA	PD	Pts
Japan	3	0	0	109	26	+83	9
China	2	0	1	98	45	+53	7
Thailand	1	0	2	17	82	–65	5
United Arab Emirates	0	0	3	24	95	–71	3

9 November
10:50

China	49–5	United Arab Emirates

Boonyachinda Stadium, Bangkok

9 November
11:15

Japan	40–0	Thailand

Boonyachinda Stadium, Bangkok

9 November
14:10

China	35–5	Thailand

Boonyachinda Stadium, Bangkok

9 November
14:35

Japan	34–12	United Arab Emirates

Boonyachinda Stadium, Bangkok

9 November
17:30

United Arab Emirates	7–12	Thailand

Boonyachinda Stadium, Bangkok

9 November
17:55

Japan	35–14	China

Boonyachinda Stadium, Bangkok

=== Plate ===
Plate semifinals
10 November – 10:00
Malaysia	19
United Arab Emirates	21
10 November – 10:25
Singapore	14
Thailand	15

Plate final
10 November – 13:45
Thailand	22
United Arab Emirates	14
7th place final
10 November – 13:20
Malaysia	19
Singapore	14

=== Cup ===
Cup semifinals
10 November – 10:50
Hong Kong	26
China	5
10 November – 11:15
South Korea	7
Japan	36

Cup final
10 November – 15:50
Hong Kong	26
Japan	15
3rd place final
10 November – 15:00
China	43
South Korea	0
