= Rugby sevens at the 1998 Asian Games – Men's tournament =

Men at the 1998 Asian Games
- Venue: Royal Thai Army Stadium
- Date: 7–8 December 1998
- Nations: 7

Medalists
gold medal	South Korea
silver medal	Japan
bronze medal	Thailand

The 1998 Men's Asian Games Rugby sevens Tournament was held in Royal Thai Army Stadium from December 7, 1998, to December 8, 1998.

== Results ==
=== Preliminary round ===
==== Group A ====
Pos	Team	Pld	W	D	L	PF	PA	PD	Pts	Qualification
1	South Korea	3	3	0	0	113	12	+101	6	Semifinals
2	Chinese Taipei	3	2	0	1	78	54	+24	4	Semifinals
3	Kazakhstan	3	1	0	2	31	108	−77	2	5th place match
4	Sri Lanka	3	0	0	3	26	74	−48	0	

Source: Results

7 December

South Korea	56–0	Kazakhstan

Royal Thai Army Stadium, Bangkok

7 December

Sri Lanka	12–28	Chinese Taipei

Royal Thai Army Stadium, Bangkok

7 December

Chinese Taipei	12–28	South Korea

Royal Thai Army Stadium, Bangkok

7 December

Kazakhstan	17–14	Sri Lanka

Royal Thai Army Stadium, Bangkok

7 December

South Korea	29–0	Sri Lanka

Royal Thai Army Stadium, Bangkok

7 December

Chinese Taipei	38–14	Kazakhstan

Royal Thai Army Stadium, Bangkok

==== Group B ====
Pos	Team	Pld	W	D	L	PF	PA	PD	Pts	Qualification
1	Japan	2	2	0	0	73	5	+68	4	Semifinals
2	Thailand	2	1	0	1	33	45	−12	2	Semifinals
3	Hong Kong	2	0	0	2	12	68	−56	0	5th place match

Source: Results

7 December

Hong Kong	0–40	Japan

Royal Thai Army Stadium, Bangkok

7 December

Thailand	5–33	Japan

Royal Thai Army Stadium, Bangkok

7 December

Hong Kong	12–28	Thailand

Royal Thai Army Stadium, Bangkok

=== 5th place match ===
8 December

Kazakhstan	12–14	Hong Kong

Royal Thai Army Stadium, Bangkok

=== Final round ===
Semifinals
8 December
South Korea	28
Thailand	10
8 December
Japan	14
Chinese Taipei	0

Final
8 December
South Korea	29
Japan	14
Bronze medal match
8 December
Thailand	19
Chinese Taipei	5

==== Semifinals ====
8 December

South Korea	28–10	Thailand

Royal Thai Army Stadium, Bangkok

8 December

Japan	14–0	Chinese Taipei

Royal Thai Army Stadium, Bangkok

==== Bronze medal match ====
8 December

Thailand	19–5	Chinese Taipei

Royal Thai Army Stadium, Bangkok

==== Final ====
8 December

South Korea	29–14	Japan

Royal Thai Army Stadium, Bangkok

== Final standing ==
Rank	Team	Pld	W	D	L
1st place, gold medalist(s)	South Korea	5	5	0	0
2nd place, silver medalist(s)	Japan	4	3	0	1
3rd place, bronze medalist(s)	Thailand	4	2	0	2
4	Chinese Taipei	5	2	0	3
5	Hong Kong	3	1	0	2
6	Kazakhstan	4	1	0	3
7	Sri Lanka	3	0	0	3
