= 2001 Singer Sri Lankan Airlines Rugby 7s =

Tournament details
- Countries: 15
- Tournament format(s): Knockout
- Date: 15–16 September 2001

Tournament statistics
- Teams: 16
- Matches played: 37

Final
- Venue: Bogambara Stadium
- Champions: Chinese Taipei
- Runners-up: South Korea

The 2001 Singer Sri Lankan Airlines Rugby 7s was the third year of the Singer Sri Lankan Airlines Rugby 7s tournament. All matches were played at Bogambara Stadium in Kandy, Sri Lanka on 15 and 16 September 2001. 2001 was the second year that the competition was expanded to include non-Asian rugby playing nations, with teams from the Belgium, Czech Republic, Denmark and Germany competing. Chinese Taipei defeated South Korea in the final to take the Cup for the second time, becoming the first team to win the cup twice. The Czech Republic and Denmark won the Bowl and Plate finals respectively.

== Group stage ==
Key to colours in group tables
Teams advanced to the Cup quarter-final
Teams advanced to the Plate semi-final
Teams advanced to the Bowl semi-final

=== Pool A ===
- Malaysia 21–0 Czech Republic
- Sri Lanka 26–19 South Korea
- Malaysia 14–12 Sri Lanka
- South Korea 35–14 Czech Republic
- Sri Lanka 28–5 Czech Republic
- South Korea 24–7 Malaysia

Teams	Pld	W	D	L	PF	PA	+/−	Pts
South Korea	3	2	0	1	78	47	+31	7
Sri Lanka	3	2	0	1	66	33	+28	7
Malaysia	3	2	0	1	42	36	+6	7
Czech Republic	3	0	0	3	19	84	−65	0

=== Pool B ===
- Singapore 5–0 (Cooperation Council for the Arab States of the Gulf) Arabian Gulf
- Belgium 20–10 China
- Singapore 14–0 Belgium
- (Cooperation Council for the Arab States of the Gulf) Arabian Gulf 24–19 China
- Belgium 14–0 (Cooperation Council for the Arab States of the Gulf) Arabian Gulf
- China 14–12 Singapore

Teams	Pld	W	D	L	PF	PA	+/−	Pts
Singapore	3	2	0	1	31	14	+17	7
Belgium	3	2	0	1	34	24	+10	7
China	3	1	0	2	43	58	−15	5
(Cooperation Council for the Arab States of the Gulf) Arabian Gulf	3	1	0	2	24	43	−19	5

=== Pool C ===
- Kazakhstan 38–7 India
- Germany 26–5 Hong Kong
- Germany 54–0 India
- Hong Kong 19–12 Kazakhstan
- Germany 19–5 Kazakhstan
- Hong Kong 50–0 India

Teams	Pld	W	D	L	PF	PA	+/−	Pts
Germany	3	3	0	0	99	10	+89	9
Hong Kong	3	2	0	1	74	38	+36	7
Kazakhstan	3	1	0	2	55	45	+10	5
India	3	0	0	3	7	142	−135	3

=== Pool D ===
- Thailand 26–0 Sri Lanka Barbarians
- Denmark 31–12 Thailand
- Chinese Taipei 12–0 Denmark
- Chinese Taipei 47–0 Sri Lanka Barbarians
- Denmark 14–12 Sri Lanka Barbarians
- Thailand 24–19 Chinese Taipei

Teams	Pld	W	D	L	PF	PA	+/−	Pts
Chinese Taipei	3	2	0	1	78	24	+54	7
Thailand	3	2	0	1	62	50	+12	7
Denmark	3	2	0	1	45	36	+9	7
Sri Lanka Barbarians	3	0	0	3	12	87	−75	3

== Second round ==
=== Bowl ===
Semi-finals
(Cooperation Council for the Arab States of the Gulf) Arabian Gulf	17
Sri Lanka Barbarians	12
Czech Republic	43
India	7

Final
(Cooperation Council for the Arab States of the Gulf) Arabian Gulf	14
Czech Republic	15

=== Plate ===
Semi-finals
China	14
Denmark	26
Kazakhstan	12
Malaysia	21

Final
Denmark	24
Malaysia	14

=== Cup ===
Quarter-finals
Chinese Taipei	17
Singapore	10
Thailand	19
Belgium	12
South Korea	24
Hong Kong	12
Sri Lanka	21
Germany	7

Semi-finals
Chinese Taipei	31
Thailand	7
South Korea	24
Sri Lanka	7

Final
Chinese Taipei	26
South Korea	21
