= Kazakhstan national rugby sevens team =

Kazakhstan Sevens Team
- Union: Kazakhstan Rugby Union
Team kit	Change kit

The Kazakhstan national rugby sevens team is a minor national sevens side.

== Singer Sri Lankan Airlines Rugby 7s ==
Year	Cup	Plate	Bowl
1999	South Korea	Malaysia	India
2000	Chinese Taipei	Japan	Thailand
2001	Chinese Taipei	Denmark	Czech Republic
2002	Portugal	South Korea	Hong Kong
2003	Kenya	Sri Lanka	Arabian Gulf
2004	Japan	Sri Lanka	Kazakhstan
2005	Japan	Sri Lanka	Arabian Gulf
2006	South Korea	Thailand	Malaysia
2007	Hong Kong	China	India
2008			

== Rugby at the 1998 Asian Games ==
Group A matches -

Team	Pts	Pld	W	L	PW	PL
South Korea	9	3	3	0	113	12
Chinese Taipei	7	3	2	1	78	54
Kazakhstan	5	3	1	2	31	108
Sri Lanka	3	3	0	3	26	74

December 7

South Korea	56 – 0	Kazakhstan
Chinese Taipei	28 – 12	Sri Lanka
Sri Lanka	14 – 17	Kazakhstan
South Korea	28 – 12	Chinese Taipei
South Korea	29 – 0	Sri Lanka
Chinese Taipei	38 – 14	Kazakhstan

December 8 - 5th place match

Kazakhstan	12 – 14	Hong Kong

== Results ==
Asia Rugby Sevens Series

2008 Singer Sri Lankan Airlines Rugby 7s

2009 Carlton Rugby 7s

2010 Carlton Rugby 7s

Rugby sevens at the 2013 Asian Youth Games

== See also ==
- Kazakhstan national rugby union team
