= Rugby union in Thailand =

Sport in Thailand

- Country: Thailand
- Governing body: Thai Rugby Union
- National team: Thailand
- First played: Early 20th century
- Registered players: 16,121
- Clubs: 154

National competitions
- Rugby World Cup; Rugby World Cup Sevens; IRB Sevens World Series; Asian Five Nations; Rugby union at the Asian Games

Rugby union in Thailand is a significant sport. They are currently ranked 60th, with 16,121 registered players.

The governing body is the Thai Rugby Union, which was founded in 1937, and affiliated to the IRFB in 1989.

== History ==
Thai rugby goes back to the early twentieth century. Unlike most other Asian countries, Thailand does not have a history of European colonialism, and was one of the few to maintain its neutrality. Thus Thai rugby is not a legacy of colonialism.

Some of the Thai middle class took up the sport in the 1920s, along with ex-patriates from French and English speaking countries. The Second World War interrupted the development of the sport, but its adoption by the Thai military and police ensured its survival.

Thai rugby still has a strong ex-pat connection; one of the most famous players for Thailand is best known for being Will Carling's brother. The Southerners Sports Club (Bangkok), and the Old Bangkok Bangers Rugby Club are Thailand's main ex-pat rugby clubs, fielding sides in the local Thailand Rugby Union competition, and in local and international 7s and 10s tournaments.

There has been a resurgence of Rugby up North in Chiang Mai with the Chiang Mai All Stars, Chiang Mai Cobras, Chiang Mai University and Lanna Rugby Club all playing regular games and hosting tournaments. The Chiang Mai Rugby 11s played annually in November is fast becoming one of the regions popular tournament destinations.

There are now at least fifty clubs in Thailand.

== National team ==
Thailand has a national sevens team. The Scottish rugby commentator, Bill McLaren mentioned the Thais in a report on the 1989 Hong Kong Sevens, and noted that they supplied at least one referee for the tournament, Vengsakern Paerehitya of the Royal Thai Air Force, who gained valuable experience by working with the other internationally renowned referees at the game.

== International hosting ==
Thailand has hosted two international rugby tournaments -

- at the 1998 Asian Games
- at the 2007 Southeast Asian Games

== See also ==
- Thailand national rugby union team
