= 2006 Singer Sri Lankan Airlines Rugby 7s =

- Host nation: Sri Lanka
- Date: 16–17 September 2006

Cup
- Champion: South Korea
- Runner-up: China

Plate
- Winner: (Cooperation Council for the Arab States of the Gulf) Arabian Gulf
- Runner-up: Thailand

Bowl
- Winner: Malaysia
- Runner-up: India

Tournament details
- Matches played: 12

The 2006 Singer Sri Lankan Airlines Rugby 7s was the eighth year that the Singer Sri Lankan Airlines Rugby 7s tournament had been held. South Korea defeated, China 24–19, in the final of the Cup.

== Pool stage ==
Key to colours in group tables
Teams advanced to the Cup quarter-final

=== Pool A ===
Teams	Pld	W	D	L	PF	PA	+/−	Pts
South Korea	2	2	0	0	98	7	+91	6
Hong Kong	2	1	0	1	33	42	−9	4
Malaysia	2	0	0	2	7	89	−82	2

South Korea	35–7	Hong Kong

Hong Kong	26–7	Malaysia

South Korea	63–0	Malaysia

=== Pool B ===
Teams	Pld	W	D	L	PF	PA	+/−	Pts
Chinese Taipei	2	2	0	0	80	5	+75	6
Kazakhstan	2	1	0	1	46	31	+15	4
Philippines	2	0	0	2	5	95	−90	2

Chinese Taipei	31–0	Kazakhstan

Kazakhstan	46–0	Philippines

Chinese Taipei	49–5	Philippines

=== Pool C ===
Teams	Pld	W	D	L	PF	PA	+/−	Pts
Sri Lanka	2	2	0	0	79	7	+72	6
(Cooperation Council for the Arab States of the Gulf) Arabian Gulf	2	1	0	1	37	40	-3	4
Pakistan	2	0	0	2	0	69	−69	3

- Sri Lanka 40–7 (Cooperation Council for the Arab States of the Gulf) Arabian Gulf
- (Cooperation Council for the Arab States of the Gulf) Arabian Gulf 30–0 Pakistan
- Sri Lanka 39–0 Pakistan

=== Pool D ===
Teams	Pld	W	D	L	PF	PA	+/−	Pts
China	2	2	0	0	86	7	+79	6
Thailand	2	1	0	1	47	45	+2	4
India	2	0	0	2	7	88	+81	2

- China 38–7 Thailand
- China 48–0 India
- Thailand 40–7 India

== Knockout stage ==
=== Bowl ===
Semi-finals
India	24
Pakistan	0
Malaysia	46
Philippines	0

Final
India	10
Malaysia	14

=== Plate ===
Semi-finals
(Cooperation Council for the Arab States of the Gulf) Arabian Gulf	24
Hong Kong	12
Kazakhstan	22
Thailand	26

Final
(Cooperation Council for the Arab States of the Gulf) Arabian Gulf	5
Thailand	26

=== Cup ===
Quarter-finals
South Korea	31
Kazakhstan	7
Sri Lanka	35
Thailand	19
Chinese Taipei	21
Hong Kong	5
China	31
(Cooperation Council for the Arab States of the Gulf) Arabian Gulf	5

Semi-finals
South Korea	14
Sri Lanka	12
China	19
Chinese Taipei	17

Final
South Korea	24
China	19
