= 2000 Singer Sri Lankan Airlines Rugby 7s =

Tournament details
- Countries: 15
- Tournament format(s): Knockout
- Date: 5–6 September 2000

Tournament statistics
- Teams: 16
- Matches played: 37

Final
- Venue: Bogambara Stadium
- Champions: Chinese Taipei
- Runners-up: South Korea

The 2000 Singer Sri Lankan Airlines Rugby 7s was the second year of the Singer Sri Lankan Airlines Rugby 7s tournament. All matches were played at Bogambara Stadium in Kandy, Sri Lanka. Following the success of the inaugural competition the previous year the tournament was made an open event and expanded to 16 teams, with four teams from Europe competing. Chinese Taipei defeated South Korea 38 points to 21 in the final of the Cup, with the Bowl final won by Thailand and the Plate final by Japan.

== Group stage ==
Key to colours in group tables
Teams advanced to the Cup quarter-final
Teams advanced to the Plate semi-final
Teams advanced to the Bowl semi-final

=== Pool A ===
- South Korea 59–0 Sri Lanka Barbarians
- South Korea 26–7 Malaysia
- South Korea 47–0 (Cooperation Council for the Arab States of the Gulf) Arabian Gulf
- Malaysia 14–5 Sri Lanka Barbarians
- Sri Lanka Barbarians 31–14 (Cooperation Council for the Arab States of the Gulf) Arabian Gulf
- (Cooperation Council for the Arab States of the Gulf) Arabian Gulf 29–11 Malaysia

Teams	Pld	W	D	L	PF	PA	+/−	Pts
South Korea	3	3	0	0	132	07	+125	9
(Cooperation Council for the Arab States of the Gulf) Arabian Gulf	3	1	0	2	43	89	−46	5
Malaysia	3	1	0	2	33	60	-27	5
Sri Lanka Barbarians	3	1	0	2	36	87	−51	5

=== Pool B ===
- Denmark 19–14 Japan
- Czech Republic 19–14 Thailand
- Czech Republic 26–21 Japan
- Denmark 28–7 Thailand
- Japan 36–7 Thailand
- Denmark 19–0 Czech Republic

Teams	Pld	W	D	L	PF	PA	+/−	Pts
Denmark	3	3	0	0	66	21	+45	9
Czech Republic	3	2	0	1	45	54	−9	7
Japan	3	1	0	2	71	52	+19	5
Thailand	3	0	0	3	28	83	−55	3

=== Pool C ===
- Chinese Taipei 24–7 Netherlands
- Sri Lanka 45–12 Singapore
- Sri Lanka 28–17 Netherlands
- Chinese Taipei 19–19 Sri Lanka
- Netherlands 38–7 Singapore
- Chinese Taipei 45–7 Singapore

Teams	Pld	W	D	L	PF	PA	+/−	Pts
Chinese Taipei	3	2	1	0	88	33	+55	8
Sri Lanka	3	2	1	0	92	48	+44	7
Netherlands	3	1	0	2	62	59	−3	5
Singapore	3	0	0	3	26	128	−102	3

=== Pool D ===
- China 49–0 India
- Germany 47–7 China
- Germany 70–0 India
- Germany 28–19 Hong Kong
- Hong Kong 42–7 China
- Hong Kong 40–0 India

Teams	Pld	W	D	L	PF	PA	+/−	Pts
Germany	3	3	0	0	145	26	+119	9
Hong Kong	3	2	0	1	101	35	+66	7
China	3	2	0	1	63	89	−26	5
India	3	0	0	3	159	00	−159	3

== Second round ==
=== Bowl ===
Semi-finals
Thailand	21
Singapore	14
Sri Lanka Barbarians	33
India	14

Final
Thailand	35
Sri Lanka Barbarians	26

=== Plate ===
Semi-finals
Japan	26
Netherlands	12
China	24
Malaysia	07

Final
Japan	42
China	00

=== Cup ===
Quarter-finals
Chinese Taipei	24
Denmark	19
Sri Lanka	40
Czech Republic	10
Germany	17
(Cooperation Council for the Arab States of the Gulf) Arabian Gulf	14
South Korea	40
Hong Kong	7

Semi-finals
Chinese Taipei	22
Sri Lanka	12
South Korea	19
Germany	17

Final
Chinese Taipei	38
South Korea	21
