= 2008 Singer Sri Lankan Airlines Rugby 7s =

Tournament details
- Countries: 10
- Tournament format(s): Knockout
- Date: 6–7 September 2008

Tournament statistics
- Teams: 10
- Matches played: 29

Final
- Venue: Bogambara Stadium
- Champions: Malaysia
- Runners-up: South Korea

The 2008 Singer Sri Lankan Airlines Rugby 7s was the tenth year and final year of the Singer Sri Lankan Airlines Rugby 7s tournament. Malaysia defeated South Korea 31–21 in the final of the Cup.

== First round ==
Key to colours in group tables
Teams advanced to the Cup quarter-final
Teams advanced to the Plate semi-final
Teams advanced to the Bowl final

=== Pool A ===
- South Korea 10–10 Malaysia
- Thailand 28–24 (Cooperation Council for the Arab States of the Gulf) Arabian Gulf
- South Korea 21–12 (Cooperation Council for the Arab States of the Gulf) Arabian Gulf
- Malaysia 52–0 India
- Thailand 33–0 India
- Malaysia 19–12 (Cooperation Council for the Arab States of the Gulf) Arabian Gulf
- South Korea 19–7 Thailand
- (Cooperation Council for the Arab States of the Gulf) Arabian Gulf 50–0 India
- Malaysia 41–0 Thailand
- South Korea 45–0 India

Teams	Pld	W	D	L	PF	PA	+/−	Pts
Malaysia	4	3	1	0	122	22	+100	11
South Korea	4	3	1	0	95	29	+66	11
Thailand	4	2	0	2	68	84	−16	8
(Cooperation Council for the Arab States of the Gulf) Arabian Gulf	4	1	0	3	98	68	+30	6
India	4	0	0	4	0	180	−180	4

=== Pool B ===
- Sri Lanka 17–7 China
- Chinese Taipei 21–7 Kazakhstan
- Sri Lanka 22–7 Chinese Taipei
- China 45–0 Singapore
- Kazakhstan 45–0 Singapore
- China 45–0 Chinese Taipei
- Sri Lanka 34–0 Kazakhstan
- Chinese Taipei 31–5 Singapore
- China 19–7 Kazakhstan
- Sri Lanka 24–0 Singapore

Teams	Pld	W	D	L	PF	PA	+/−	Pts
Sri Lanka	4	4	0	0	97	14	83	12
China	4	3	0	1	116	19	+97	10
Chinese Taipei	4	2	0	2	59	79	−20	8
Kazakhstan	4	1	0	3	59	74	−15	6
Singapore	4	0	0	4	10	145	−135	4

== Second round ==
=== Bowl ===
Final
Singapore	15
India	0

=== Plate ===
Semi-finals
Chinese Taipei	15
(Cooperation Council for the Arab States of the Gulf) Arabian Gulf	10
Kazakhstan	17
Thailand	12

Final
Chinese Taipei	22
Kazakhstan	12

=== Cup ===
Semi-finals
South Korea	28
Sri Lanka	14
Malaysia	35
China	14

Final
South Korea	21
Malaysia	31
