= 2004 Singer Sri Lankan Airlines Rugby 7s =

Tournament details
- Countries: 12
- Tournament format(s): Knockout
- Date: 10–11 September 2004

Tournament statistics
- Teams: 12
- Matches played: 25

Final
- Venue: Bogambara Stadium
- Champions: Japan
- Runners-up: Chinese Taipei

The 2004 Singer Sri Lankan Airlines Rugby 7s was the sixth year of the Singer Sri Lankan Airlines Rugby 7s tournament. It also doubled as an Asian qualifier for the 2005 Rugby World Cup Sevens. Japan defeated Chinese Taipei, 38–14, in the final of the Cup.

== First round ==
Key to colours in group tables
Teams advanced to the Cup quarter-final
Teams advanced to the Bowl semi-final

=== Pool A ===
- Chinese Taipei 45–7 Malaysia
- Malaysia 19–14 Guam
- Chinese Taipei 31–14 Guam

Teams	Pld	W	D	L	PF	PA	+/−	Pts
Chinese Taipei	2	2	0	0	76	21	+55	6
Malaysia	2	1	0	1	26	59	−33	4
Guam	2	0	0	2	28	50	−22	2

=== Pool B ===
- Thailand 26–10 Sri Lanka
- Sri Lanka 26–10 Kazakhstan
- Thailand 33–5 Kazakhstan

Teams	Pld	W	D	L	PF	PA	+/−	Pts
Thailand	2	2	0	0	59	15	+44	6
Sri Lanka	2	1	0	1	36	36	0	4
Kazakhstan	2	0	0	2	15	59	−44	2

=== Pool C ===
- Japan 31–5 China
- China 77–0 India
- Japan 45–5 India

Teams	Pld	W	D	L	PF	PA	+/−	Pts
Japan	2	2	0	0	76	10	+66	6
China	2	1	0	1	82	31	+51	4
India	2	0	0	2	5	122	−117	3

=== Pool D ===
- South Korea 40–7 Singapore
- (Cooperation Council for the Arab States of the Gulf) Arabian Gulf 31–0 Singapore
- South Korea 28–14 (Cooperation Council for the Arab States of the Gulf) Arabian Gulf

Teams	Pld	W	D	L	PF	PA	+/−	Pts
South Korea	2	2	0	0	68	21	+47	6
(Cooperation Council for the Arab States of the Gulf) Arabian Gulf	2	1	0	1	45	28	+17	4
Singapore	2	0	0	2	7		+9	2

== Second round ==
=== Bowl ===
Semi-finals
Kazakhstan	44
India	12
Guam	24
Singapore	12

Final
Kazakhstan	20
Guam	5

=== Plate ===
Semi-finals
(Cooperation Council for the Arab States of the Gulf) Arabian Gulf	24
China	7
Sri Lanka	29
Malaysia	7

Final
(Cooperation Council for the Arab States of the Gulf) Arabian Gulf	19
Sri Lanka	31

=== Cup ===
Quarter-finals
Chinese Taipei	14
(Cooperation Council for the Arab States of the Gulf) Arabian Gulf	10
Thailand	38
China	0
Japan	47
Sri Lanka	5
South Korea	39
Malaysia	0

Semi-finals
Chinese Taipei	22
Thailand	17
Japan	22
South Korea	0

Final
Chinese Taipei	24
Japan	38
