= 2010 Asian Five Nations =

- Date: 24 April 2010 – 22 May 2010
- Countries: Arabian Gulf; Hong Kong; Japan; Kazakhstan; South Korea

Final positions
- Champions: Japan (18th title)

Tournament statistics
- Matches played: 10
- Website: www.asian5nations.com

The 2010 Asian Five Nations, known as the 2010 HSBC Asian 5 Nations due to its sponsorship by HSBC, was the third series of the Asian Five Nations, the flagship competition devised by the International Rugby Board (IRB) to develop rugby union in Asia. The top five teams took part in a round-robin competition held on five consecutive weekends between 24 April and 22 May 2010, with each match hosted by one of the participants. Four other divisions operating on a single-elimination basis also took place, with a system of promotion and relegation between the four divisions and the main tournament.

The main tournament was contested by the Arabian Gulf rugby union team, Hong Kong, Japan, Kazakhstan and South Korea. Japan maintained their unbeaten streak within the Asian Five Nations, winning the tournament for the third time in a row, with an average winning margin of over seventy points in their four games. As champions, they qualified for the 2011 Rugby World Cup in New Zealand. Kazakhstan, who placed second with two victories, qualified for the final place play-offs, where they were defeated by Uruguay. Hong Kong and the Arabian Gulf came third and fourth respectively, with two victories each, while Korea were relegated to Division One for the 2011 competition after failing to win a match.

== Changes from 2009 ==
- Singapore has been replaced with Arabian Gulf, who earns promotion from Division 1.

== Teams ==
The teams involved, with their world rankings pre tournament, were:

- Arabian Gulf (44)
- Hong Kong (39)
- Japan (13)
- Kazakhstan (26)
- South Korea (24)

== Final Table ==
Champions
Relegated to Division One for 2011

Pos	Nation	Games				Points				Table points	
Pos	Nation	Played	Won	Drawn	Lost	For	Against	Diff	Tries	Bonus Points	Points
1	Japan	4	4	0	0	326	30	+296	50	4	24
2	Kazakhstan	4	2	0	2	94	173	−76	9	3	13
3	Hong Kong	4	2	0	2	65	133	−68	7	2	12
4	Arabian Gulf	4	2	0	2	70	128	−61	7	0	10
5	South Korea	4	0	0	4	65	156	−91	9	3	3

Scoring System

- Win – 5 Points
- Draw – 3 Points
- Loss – 0 Points
- Bonus points for scoring four tries or for losing by no more than 7 points.

=== Fixtures ===
Home	Score (Tries)	Away	Match Information
Home	Score (Tries)	Away	Date	Venue
Hong Kong	32–8 (4–1)	South Korea	24-Apr-2010	Hong Kong FC Stadium, Hong Kong
Kazakhstan	43–28 (4–3)	Arabian Gulf	24-Apr-2010	National University Stadium, Almaty
Arabian Gulf	16–9 (1–0)	Hong Kong	30-Apr-2010	Bahrain Sports Club, Manama, Bahrain
South Korea	13–71 (1–11)	Japan	1-May-2010	Gyeongsang Rugby Stadium, Daegu
Japan	60–5 (10–1)	Arabian Gulf	8-May-2010	Chichibunomiya Rugby Stadium, Tokyo
Hong Kong	19–15 (2–0)	Kazakhstan	8-May-2010	Hong Kong FC Stadium, Hong Kong
Arabian Gulf	21–19 (2–3)	South Korea	14-May-2010	The Sevens, Dubai
Kazakhstan	7–101 (1–15)	Japan	15-May-2010	Chichibunomiya Rugby Stadium, Tokyo
Japan	94–5 (14–1)	Hong Kong	22-May-2010	Chichibunomiya Rugby Stadium, Tokyo
South Korea	25–32 (4–4)	Kazakhstan	22-May-2010	Incheon Munhak Stadium, Incheon

NB:

- The Kazakhstan–Japan fixture was moved from Almaty to Tokyo.
- The Arabian Gulf–Korea match was the last Test for the Arabian Gulf team.
