= 2005 Singer Sri Lankan Airlines Rugby 7s =

Tournament details
- Countries: 12
- Tournament format(s): Knockout
- Date: 10–11 September 2005

Tournament statistics
- Teams: 12
- Matches played: 25

Final
- Venue: Bogambara Stadium
- Champions: Japan
- Runners-up: South Korea

The 2005 Singer Sri Lankan Airlines Rugby 7s was the seventh year of the Singer Sri Lankan Airlines Rugby 7s tournament. The competition served as the qualifier for the 2006 Asian Games, with the highest placed eight teams being selected to play in Qatar. In the Cup final Japan defeated South Korea, 28–10, and in the Plate final Sri Lanka won, 17–0, against Kazakhstan.

== First round ==
Key to colours in group tables
Teams advanced to the Cup quarter-final
Teams advanced to the Bowl semi-final

=== Pool A ===
- China 40–0 Hong Kong
- China 26–5 Malaysia
- Hong Kong 10–5 Malaysia

Teams	Pld	W	D	L	PF	PA	+/−	Pts
China	2	2	0	0	66	5	+61	6
Hong Kong	2	1	0	1	10	45	−35	4
Malaysia	2	0	0	2	10	36	−26	2

=== Pool B ===
- South Korea 21–12 (Cooperation Council for the Arab States of the Gulf) Arabian Gulf
- Kazakhstan 7–5 (Cooperation Council for the Arab States of the Gulf) Arabian Gulf
- South Korea 24–5 Kazakhstan

Teams	Pld	W	D	L	PF	PA	+/−	Pts
South Korea	2	2	0	0	45	17	+28	6
Kazakhstan	2	1	0	1	12	29	−17	4
(Cooperation Council for the Arab States of the Gulf) Arabian Gulf	2	0	0	2	17	28	−11	2

=== Pool C ===
- Chinese Taipei 26–0 Sri Lanka
- Sri Lanka 37–7 Guam
- Chinese Taipei 59–0 Guam

Teams	Pld	W	D	L	PF	PA	+/−	Pts
Chinese Taipei	2	2	0	0	75	0	+75	6
Sri Lanka	2	1	0	1	37	33	+4	4
Guam	2	0	0	2	7	96	−89	3

=== Pool D ===
- Japan 26–12 Thailand
- Thailand 22–7 Singapore
- Japan 57–0 Singapore

Teams	Pld	W	D	L	PF	PA	+/−	Pts
Japan	2	2	0	0	83	12	+71	6
Thailand	2	1	0	1	34	33	+1	4
Singapore	2	0	0	2	7	79	−72	2

== Second round ==
=== Bowl ===
Semi-finals
(Cooperation Council for the Arab States of the Gulf) Arabian Gulf	43
Guam	5
Malaysia	19
Singapore	12

Final
(Cooperation Council for the Arab States of the Gulf) Arabian Gulf	40
Malaysia	12

=== Plate ===
Semi-finals
Sri Lanka	17
Thailand	10
Kazakhstan	19
Hong Kong	17

Final
Sri Lanka	17
Kazakhstan	0

=== Cup ===
Quarter-finals
China	26
Thailand	14
South Korea	26
Sri Lanka	5
Japan	19
Hong Kong	5
Chinese Taipei	19
Kazakhstan	5

Semi-finals
China	0
South Korea	29
Japan	12
Chinese Taipei	0

Final
South Korea	18
Japan	28
