= Tokkie Smith =

Hong Kong Rugby Sevens founder (1934–1985)

Arthur Dennison Cooley "Tokkie" Smith (1934 – 12 July 1985) was chairman of Hong Kong Rugby Football Union 1973–1978, who was recognised for his long service to Rugby Asia and for founding and managing the first three Hong Kong International Sevens tournaments.

== Early life in South Africa ==
Smith was born in 1934 in East London, South Africa and grew up at the beginning of apartheid, his rugby being totally segregated. After finishing school, he left South Africa to travel the world and he ended up in Hong Kong in 1959 where he essentially spent the rest of his life.

It was an active rugby location for him where many expatriates considered the game a way of life.

== Rugby in Hong Kong ==
There were twenty teams in Hong Kong dominated by the Club, the Army, RAF, Navy and the Police. Selected teams took on any tourists or docked war ships, particularly New Zealand frigates.

Tokkie was a second row forward. He was soon Football Club captain and helped improve results to a point where they became regular winners.

== Rugby in Asia ==
With improving travel communications there were more rugby tours between Asian countries, plus visits by Australian and New Zealand military and naval teams released from duties in the region.

The local Blarney Stone Sevens later became Tokkie's model for the first multi-racial International Sevens. The Blarney Stones had become a three-day, thirty-two team event played at the end of each season.

Thanks to business and personal relationships, he joined several members Clubs and became part of the Hong Kong establishment. Elected a revered Life Member of the Football Club he moved on into rugby management.

After years of touring experience he took part in founding the Asian Rugby Football Union. This was the only Union in the world set up on independent lines and contained nine different nations. In 1973 he was elected Chairman of Hong Kong Rugby Football Union and became prominent in the expanding regional sport.

== The Hong Kong Sevens ==
Rugby was changing. Minor sponsorships had been recognised by RFU which had even launched a committee to advise on the subject.

A leading tobacco company approached Tokkie Smith in 1975 and offered to sponsor an international tournament in Hong Kong. These tournaments were normally held exclusively between traditional rugby countries, as for example the 1973 International Seven-a-side Tournament held by Scotland to celebrate their Centenary.

In 1975 Tokkie convinced the HKRFU committee and the sponsors to promote an international tournament, but in the interest of economy and practicality they decided upon Sevens and held the first Hong Kong International Sevens Tournament in March 1976.

He managed the first three vital tournaments out of his own office. He wrote to his sponsors, “It is unquestionably the most colourful day of sport I have ever seen. It has put Hong Kong on the international sporting map.”

The games in 1978 added four more countries, expanding the tournament to 16 international teams. It rained incessantly but nevertheless, the third Sevens was reported as “magnificent”.

The Hong Kong Sevens were recognised as “The largest international rugby tournament” in the world by the Guinness Book of Records

Over the years, the tournament continued to grow - especially for the sponsors. This was changing the dynamics of rugby in Hong Kong as money played an increasing influence in tournament decisions.

== Tokkie's Dragons ==
After completing his term as Sevens Chairman, he unsuccessfully promoted a tour to Asia by a mixed-race South African team.

During apartheid, he defied Colonial and Commonwealth politics by taking the first ever mixed-race team on tour in South Africa in July 1982 - Tokkie's Dragons. After the tournament he was ostracised publicly by Hong Kong Rugby Football Union and stripped of his vice-presidency.

The repercussions extended to other nations. For example, Song Koon Poh of Singapore was given a lifetime ban for his part in the South African tour. It was later rescinded.

Tokkie returned to Cape Town, South Africa, in 1983.

== Personal life and death ==
His wife, Terry, left him soon after they arrived in South Africa. Tokkie Smith died in a car collision on 12 July 1985. Back in Hong Kong his friends gave him an impressive rugby send off in August 1985 at St. John's Cathedral, complete with eulogies, organ, and piper, followed by a wake in The Football Club bar.
