= 2002 Singer Sri Lankan Airlines Rugby 7s =

Tournament details
- Countries: 16
- Tournament format(s): Knockout
- Date: 14–15 September 2002

Tournament statistics
- Teams: 16
- Matches played: 37

Final
- Venue: Bogambara Stadium
- Champions: Portugal
- Runners-up: Kenya

The 2002 Singer Sri Lankan Airlines Rugby 7s was the fourth year of the Singer Sri Lankan Airlines Rugby 7s tournament. Portugal defeated Kenya, 24–21, in the final of the Cup.

== First round ==
Key to colours in group tables
Teams advanced to the Cup quarter-final
Teams advanced to the Plate semi-final
Teams advanced to the Bowl semi-final

=== Pool A ===
- Czech Republic 31–12 Singapore
- Denmark 15–15 Chinese Taipei
- Denmark 42–14 Czech Republic
- Chinese Taipei 38–7 Singapore
- Denmark 33–0 Singapore
- Chinese Taipei 33–14 Czech Republic

Teams	Pld	W	D	L	PF	PA	+/−	Pts
Denmark	3	2	1	0	90	29	+61	8
Chinese Taipei	3	2	1	0	86	36	+50	7
Czech Republic	3	1	0	2	59	87	−28	5
Singapore	3	0	0	3	19	102	−83	3

=== Pool B ===
- Malaysia 24–21 Hong Kong
- Portugal 28–0 (Cooperation Council for the Arab States of the Gulf) Arabian Gulf
- (Cooperation Council for the Arab States of the Gulf) Arabian Gulf 24–14 Malaysia
- Portugal 29–0 Hong Kong
- (Cooperation Council for the Arab States of the Gulf) Arabian Gulf 33–14 Hong Kong
- Portugal 33–7 Malaysia

Teams	Pld	W	D	L	PF	PA	+/−	Pts
Portugal	3	3	0	0	90	7	+83	9
(Cooperation Council for the Arab States of the Gulf) Arabian Gulf	3	2	0	1	57	56	+1	7
Malaysia	3	1	0	2	45	78	−33	5
Hong Kong	3	0	0	3	7	35	−51	3

=== Pool C ===
- Kenya 33–0 China
- Germany 12–7 Netherlands
- Netherlands 12–5 China
- Kenya 38–14 Germany
- Germany 19–14 China
- Kenya 40–0 Netherlands

Teams	Pld	W	D	L	PF	PA	+/−	Pts
Kenya	3	3	0	0	111	14	+97	9
Germany	3	2	0	1	45	59	−14	7
Netherlands	3	1	0	2	19	57	−38	5
China	3	0	0	3	19	64	−45	3

=== Pool D ===
- Belgium 19–0 India
- Sri Lanka 17–14 South Korea
- Belgium 21–14 South Korea
- Sri Lanka 36–19 India
- Sri Lanka 33–10 Belgium
- South Korea 54–0 India

Teams	Pld	W	D	L	PF	PA	+/−	Pts
Sri Lanka	3	3	0	0	86	43	+43	9
Belgium	3	2	0	1	50	47	+3	7
South Korea	3	1	0	2	82	38	+44	5
India	3	0	0	3	19	109	−90	3

== Second round ==
=== Bowl ===
Semi-finals
India	14
China	12
Hong Kong	26
Singapore	7

Final
Hong Kong	50
India	00

=== Plate ===
Semi-finals
South Korea	26
Netherlands	12
Malaysia	21
Czech Republic	7

Final
South Korea	27
Malaysia	26

=== Cup ===
Quarter-finals
Sri Lanka	24
(Cooperation Council for the Arab States of the Gulf) Arabian	5
Kenya	40
Chinese Taipei	12
Germany	31
Denmark	5
Portugal	31
Belgium	7

Semi-finals
Kenya	33
Sri Lanka	0
Portugal	21
Germany	19

Final
Portugal	24
Kenya	21
