= Hong Kong Sevens =

Annual rugby sevens tournament

- Current season, competition or edition: 2026 Hong Kong Sevens
- Hong Kong Sevens Logo
- Sport: Rugby sevens
- Founded: 1976
- No. of teams: 30 (since 2024)
- Countries: 15 men + 15 women
- Venues: Hong Kong Stadium (1994-2024); Kai Tak Stadium (2025-present)
- Most recent champion: South Africa (1st title)
- Most titles: Fiji (19 titles)
- Website: hksevens.com

Hong Kong Sevens
- Traditional Chinese: 香港國際七人欖球賽
- Simplified Chinese: 香港国际七人榄球赛
Transcriptions
Standard Mandarin
- Hanyu Pinyin: Xiānggǎng Guójì Qī Rén Lǎnqiúsài
- Wade–Giles: Hsiang Kang Kuo Chi Chʻi Jen Lan Chʻiu Sai
Yue: Cantonese
- Jyutping: hoeng1 gong2 gwok3 zai3 cat1 jan4 laam5*2 kau4 coi3

The Hong Kong Sevens (Chinese: 香港國際七人欖球賽) is a rugby sevens tournament held annually in Hong Kong on a weekend in late March or early April. Considered the premier tournament on the World Rugby Sevens Series competition, the Hong Kong Sevens is currently the fifth tournament on the World Series calendar and the first leg of the World Championship Series. The tournament spans three days, beginning on a Friday and concluding on Sunday. The tournament is organised each year by the Hong Kong Rugby Union (HKRU). Due to the COVID-19 pandemic, the tournament was cancelled in 2020 and 2021. The Hong Kong Rugby Sevens 2026 concluded on 19 April 2026 at Kai Tak Stadium.

== History ==
The season-ending Blarney Stone Sevens had traditionally been a part of the game’s program in Hong Kong, but HKRFU was affiliated to the RFU and internationally the game was controlled by the rugby powers. The Scottish Centenary at Easter 1973 had been a recent international Sevens tournament but to which only the establishment countries were invited. The Hong Kong Sevens became established with the first staging in 1976. It was an original idea of Rodney Bentham-Wood of Rothmans Asia - he wanted a 15 aside tournament but agreed a 7 aside tourney would be cheaper. A great deal of work between Vernon Roberts, Tokkie Smith, Bob Gaff and Mike Pratt and the two main sponsors, initially Rothmans and Cathay Pacific at the time. Over a lunch between Tokkie Smith and Rodney Bentham-Wood of Rothmans, who originally wanted to do a 15 aside tournament, the concept evolved into the 7 aside tournament. Rugby sponsorship was just being introduced and Tokkie ADC Smith, Chairman of HKRFU and worked with Ian Gow of Rothmans Hong Kong to discuss the possibility of a sponsored international rugby tournament in Hong Kong. Tokkie Smith promoted the idea to his President Vernon Roberts and to the Rugby Union Committee but on account of numbers and costs it was decided that any sponsored international tournament would need to be Sevens.

Jock Campbell of Cathay Pacific then offered to sponsor travel and the Committee led by President Vernon Roberts, Chairman Tokkie Smith, Treasurer Bob Gaff and Honorary Secretary Mike Pratt in 1975 made the decision to organize an international Sevens Tournament.

Friendly rugby countries throughout Asia and the Pacific were invited to send teams, creating the multiracial tournament. The founding program announced: Rothmans-Cathay Pacific International Seven-a-Side Championship, 28 March 1976, at the Hong Kong Football Club, and the participating countries as Australia, Fiji, Indonesia, Japan, South Korea, Malaysia, New Zealand, Sri Lanka, Singapore, Thailand, and Tonga with Hong Kong as the Home Team.

In view of the enormous success of the Sevens, the Rugby Union Committee determined to continue annually, and Tokkie Smith, still as Chairman, also managed the expanding tournaments in 1977 and 1978, establishing the series and changing rugby forever.

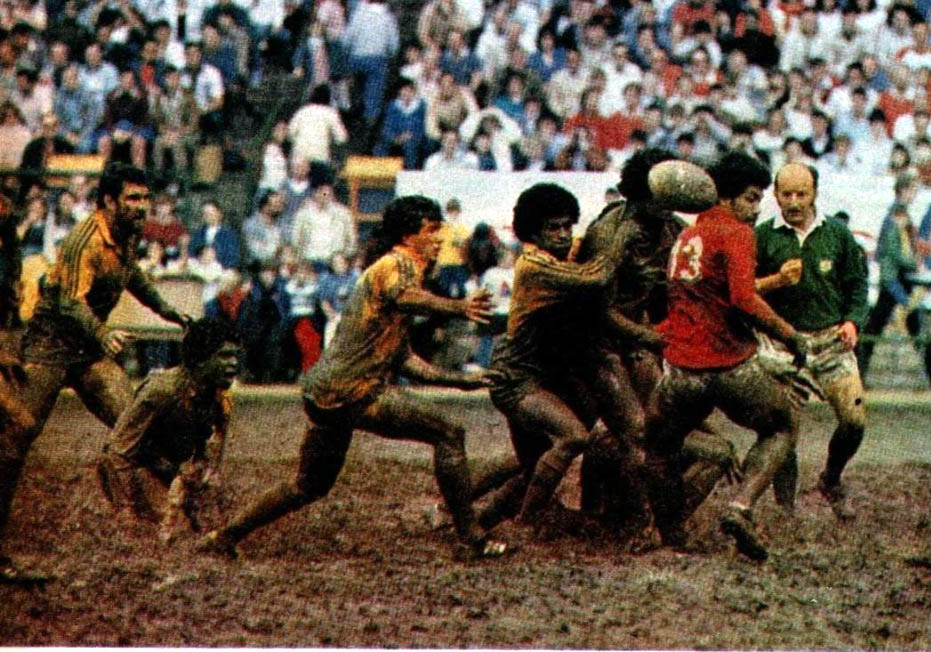
Australia v Tonga in 1983

This was an important step as this was one of the first rugby tournaments that attracted commercial sponsorship. Of the countries represented in the inaugural sevens tournament, only Australia and New Zealand did not send national sides, instead being represented by the Wallaroos and the Cantabrians respectively. These two clubs met in the final where the Cantabrians won 24–8.

The series then grew into a competition with national representative sevens sides competing, and with this growth, the tournament moved to the Hong Kong Stadium in 1982.

The Hong Kong Sevens were ahead of their time, and an influential force in the modernisation of rugby union, for example, the Hong Kong Sevens were one of the first rugby union tournaments to attract major sponsorship, when Cathay Pacific sponsored the 1976 tournament. They also provided a level of cosmopolitan international competition, which tended not to exist in rugby before the first Rugby World Cup in 1987, especially since Hong Kong was not seen as one of the "Big Eight", and other than some involvement with France, the Commonwealth teams tended to be notoriously clannish. By 1986, the Hong Kong Sevens were held up as a positive example to others:

This Seven-a-Side international tournament is without a doubt the most spectacular, exotic, best organised Rugby competition of its kind in the world, and it has consistently produced the highest standard of Sevens Rugby seen anywhere.

I was not surprised on my first visit to see quality play from the Australian, New Zealand, Fijian, and British players, but I was staggered at the amazingly high quality play produced by countries I never even knew played Rugby. South Korea and Western Samoa were every bit as good as Japan and Tonga. Malaysia, Thailand and Singapore found their lack of sheer size and bulk an insuperable handicap, but against each other they displayed a range of running and handling skills which demanded unqualified praise. Papua New Guinea, Sri Lanka and the Solomon Islands were inevitably outgunned by the teams from the major Rugby-playing nations but they still have a remarkably high level of skill which promises well for the future of the game.

The week of the Hong Kong tournament allows 24 Rugby-playing nations to intermingle for several days, and the huge cross-fertilisation of ideas can only be beneficial in the long term for the emerging nations. After the first day of the play when the top eight seeded teams meet the smaller fish in a pool system, the second day is divided into three different competitions... The strength of this great tournament is that on the opening day the most famous players in the world share a pitch with unknown opponents from countries where Rugby is a minority sport... While tournaments like the Hong Kong Sevens continue to be played, Rugby administrators can be confident that the game will continue to thrive in over 100 countries worldwide.

Bill McLaren, in his autobiography Talking of Rugby writes at length about his Hong Kong Sevens experiences:

"I remember a big South Sea islander saying that, in his view, the Hong Kong sevens were really the Olympic games of Rugby Union. Certainly, the Hong Kong event encapsulates all the really good things that the game has to offer–splendid organisation, wonderful sporting spirit, universal camaraderie, admirable field behaviour, the most enjoyable crowd participation, the chance for emergent rugby nations to lock horns with the mighty men of New Zealand, Australia, Fiji, Wales, Scotland and the Barbarians. There is, too, scintillating running and handling which is what the game is supposed to be all about."

However, despite this apparent diversity, some of the same old problems which had dogged international rugby were still manifest in the Hong Kong Sevens in the 1980s – for example, in a photograph of the Hong Kong v Bahrain game at the tournament in 1984, the teams do not appear to include anyone who is ethnically Arabian or Chinese, instead both teams are quite clearly of northern European ethnic origin.

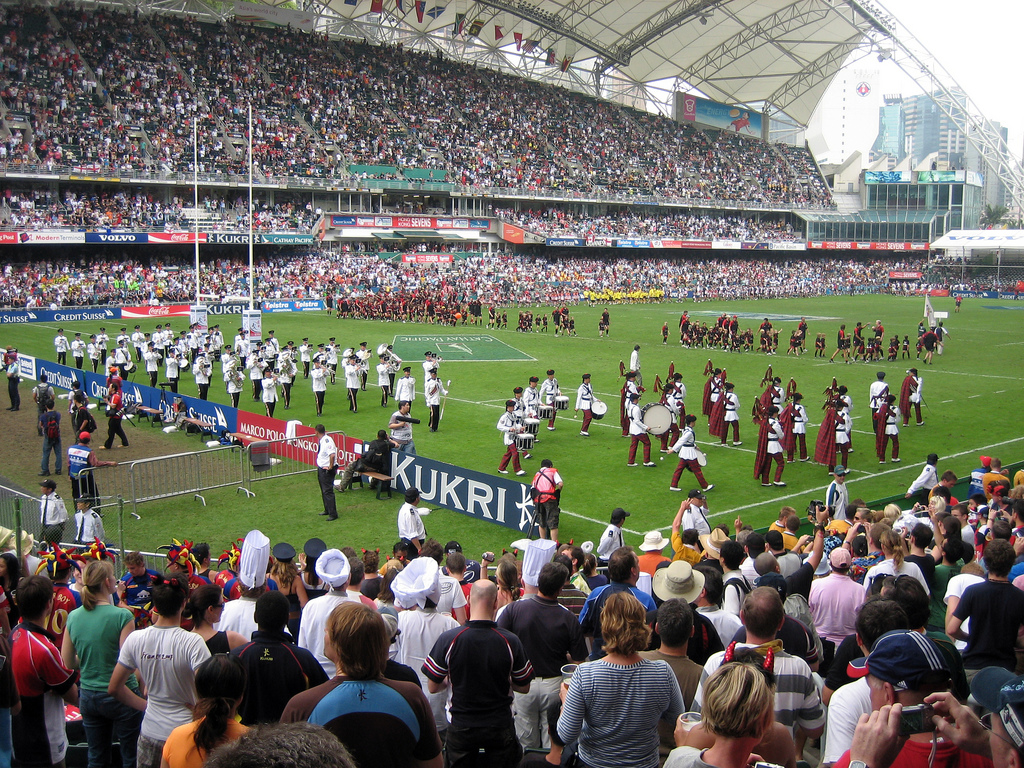
Opening Celebration 2008

In 1994, the venue was deemed too small for the tournament and was rebuilt into a 40,000-seat stadium now named the Hong Kong Stadium. New Zealand were the dominant team in the mid 1990s, winning three straight from 1994 to 1996, led by legends Eric Rush and Jonah Lomu.

Today, 24 national representative sides compete in the tournament. These include the 16 'core' members of the IRB Sevens World Series, plus eight further invited teams.

In 1997 and 2005, the Hong Kong Sevens was not held; taking its place was the Rugby World Cup Sevens, which Hong Kong hosted in both years. Fiji won both World Cup Sevens tournaments.

In 1998, the first tournament after the transfer of sovereignty to China, tickets were not sold internationally and the event was stricken with a bankrupt sponsor Peregrine. The Union's Organising Committee worked hard, and successfully implemented its marketing strategy to get the local population involved through "Friday Night is Party Night" and secured CSFB as sponsors "on a spur-of-the-moment", the event was a comparatively huge success. In 2011, after HSBC negotiated title sponsorship to the entire World Sevens Series tournaments, it was no longer possible for Credit Suisse to sponsor the Hong Kong leg after 14 years.

== Format ==
The Hong Kong Sevens is the sport's most prestigious annual rugby sevens event organised as part of the World Rugby Sevens Series. Historically, it had been contested by 24 teams; all other World Series tournaments had 16 teams participating until the 2012–13 edition. The teams are divided into six pools of four teams, who play a round-robin within the pool. The winning team of the tournament acquires 30 points towards its rankings in the World Series instead of the normal 22, and the runner-up earns 25 points instead of the normal 19. Through the 2008–09 World Series, the Hong Kong Sevens awarded 24 points to the runner-up, and 16-team events offered only 20 points for the winner and 16 for the runner-up.

The 2010 edition saw several significant changes to the tournament format. Foremost among these changes was the introduction of the fourth-level Shield trophy, which had not previously been awarded in Hong Kong. More important within the context of the World Series as a whole, the Cup and Plate are now contested in the same manner as in other competitions, with the losing quarter-finalists in the Cup parachuting into the Plate semi-finals.

=== World Series qualifier ===
Further major changes were made to the event for 2013. These changes resulted from the decision of World Rugby, then known as the International Rugby Board (IRB), to institute a formal promotion and relegation process for core teams (i.e., teams assured of playing in all series events) starting with the 2012–13 series.

For starters, the number of teams involved in the event increased from 24 to 28. However, only 16 of these teams compete for series points. The 15 core teams were joined in the main draw by the winner of the most recent edition of the HSBC Asian Sevens Series. The remaining 12 teams, specifically two qualifiers from each of the IRB's six regional zones, participated in the World Series Pre-Qualifier. Like the main draw, the Pre-Qualifier grouped the entrants into four-team pools. The top two teams from each pool, plus the top two third-place teams, advanced to a quarterfinal round, with the winners of all four matches, along with the Asian Sevens Series winner, advancing to the World Series Core Team Qualifier at the London Sevens.

The IRB further changed the promotion/relegation process in advance of the 2013–14 series. The Pre-Qualifier was folded into the Core Team Qualifier, which now involves 12 teams competing for a single promotion place as part of that season's Hong Kong Sevens.

The total prize money stands at US$150,000. The Cup Champion wins US$100,000, and the runner-up takes home US$25,000; each semi-finalist loser receives US$12,500.

=== Pool ===
Points are awarded in each pool on a different schedule from most tournaments in 15-a-side rugby union—3 for a win, 2 for a draw, 1 for a loss. The first tiebreaker is the head-to-head result between the tied teams, followed by difference in points scored during the tournament.

=== Trophies round ===
Like all other World Series tournaments, four trophies are awarded at the end of a knockout tournament. Before the reorganisation of the tournament in 2013, the six pool winners, plus the two top-rated second-place teams, played for the Cup and Plate. The Cup is awarded to the overall tournament champion. As for the other World Series tournaments, four quarterfinal losers dropped into the bracket for the Plate. The Bowl was contested by the four remaining second-place teams, plus the four top-rated third-place teams, while the Shield was contested by the eight remaining teams. The Shield was contested in Hong Kong for the first time in 2010.

Since the 2013 event, only the 16 teams in the main draw compete for trophies. The format is identical to that of other series events, with the top two teams in each pool advancing to the Cup and Plate tournaments, and the remaining teams contesting the Bowl and Shield. The losers of the Cup quarterfinals drop to the Plate tournament, and the losers of the Bowl quarterfinals drop to the Shield tournament.

== Atmosphere ==
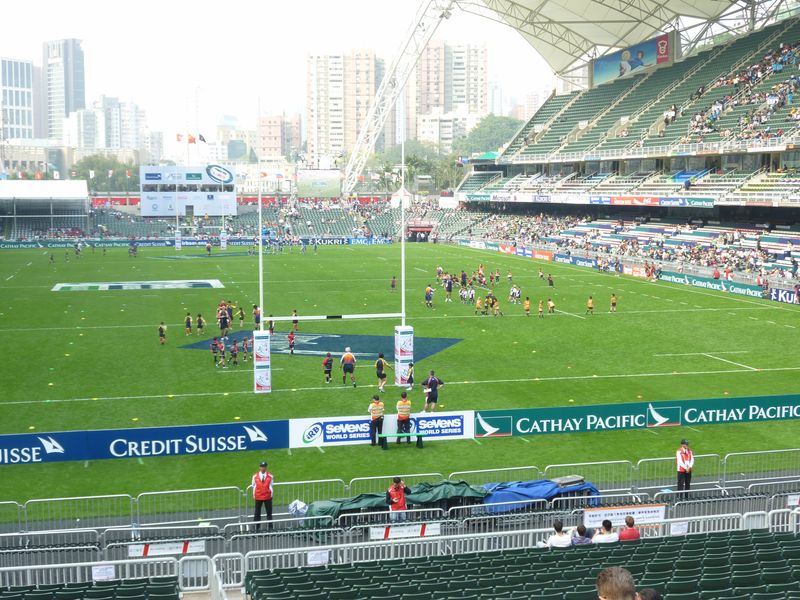
Football ground sectioned off for children's matches (2011)

The Hong Kong Sevens is traditionally one of the biggest events, if not the biggest, on the Hong Kong sporting calendar. As such, there is a tremendous party atmosphere, with the involvement of the entire rugby-playing community. A two-day women's tournament, Hong Kong Women's Rugby Sevens, precedes the men's contests. Under the auspices of the Hong Kong Mini Rugby Football Union, children with local clubs aged between 6 and 12 years play tournaments before the main matches each day. They also take part in the March Past immediately before the semi-final round of the main tournament.

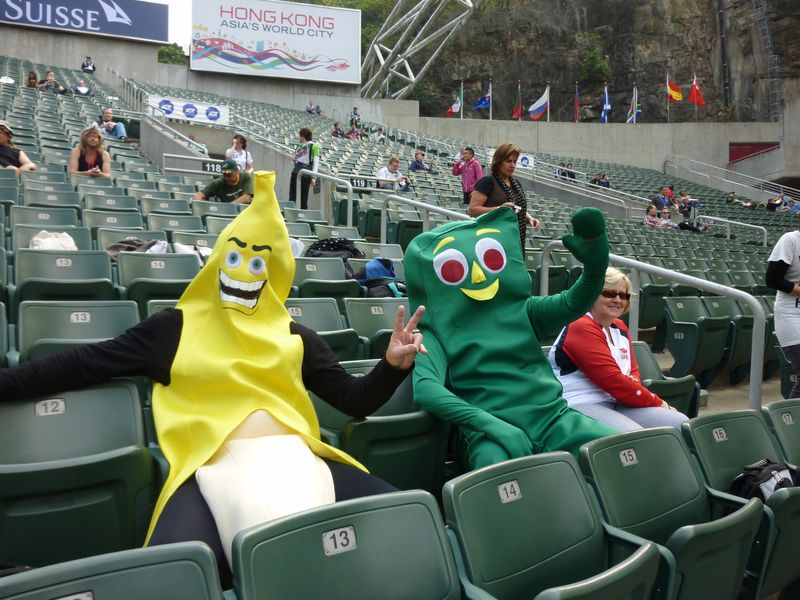
Gumby and Banana resting before the matches (2011)

For spectators, particular emphasis is placed on the South Stand, where hordes of fans dress up and dance for most of the duration of Saturday. Activities that typically ensue as the weekend progresses include the throwing of empty beer jugs (banned circa 2006) around the South Stand, Mexican waves, and streakers running across the pitch (prosecutable). Outside the stadium, the 'Sevens Village' at the Indian Recreation Club nearby is an alternative venue to gather and watch matches on giant screens, eat and drink to excess while matches are in progress; and after the match, partying continues with champagne and live music and DJs in the champagne tent. An annual public awareness campaign called "Save Our Sevens" sponsored by KELY Support Group, Hong Kong Rugby Union and supported by Start JG Hong Kong Limited encourages responsible drinking among spectators and interventions among underage drinkers while at the three-day event.

Since 2007 the South Stand has been made officially accessible to over-18s only, due to its hyper and somewhat provocative atmosphere. Streakers were formerly a regular feature, and still occasionally make a showing on the pitch, to the acclamation of the crowd. Nonetheless, most pitch invaders are caught and arrested. Following an incident in 2010 when one spectator climbed onto the crossbars at the south end of the stadium before dodging back into the stands and disappearing, organisers stepped up security and announced a zero-tolerance policy of invaders.

== Results by year ==
=== Men's tournament ===
Year	Venue	Cup			Plate (5th)	Bowl (9th)	Shield (13th, Melrose Claymores since 2023)
Year	Venue	Winner	Final Score	Runner-up	Winner	Winner	Winner
1976	HK Football Club Stadium	(New Zealand); Cantabrians	24–8	(Australia); Wallaroos	Hong Kong	No competition	No competition
1977	HK Football Club Stadium	Fiji	28–18	(New Zealand); Marlborough	Tonga	No competition	No competition
1978	HK Football Club Stadium	Fiji	14–10	(New Zealand); Manawatu	Bahrain	No competition	No competition
1979	HK Football Club Stadium	Australia	39–3	Western Samoa	Papua New Guinea	No competition	No competition
1980	HK Football Club Stadium	Fiji	12–8	(Scotland); Co-Optimists	Japan	No competition	No competition
1981	HK Football Club Stadium	(United Kingdom); Barbarian F.C.	12–10	Australia	Tonga	No competition	No competition
1982	Government Stadium	Australia	18–14	(Scotland); Scottish Border Club	South Korea	No competition	No competition
1983	Government Stadium	Australia	14–4	Fiji	South Korea	No competition	No competition
1984	Government Stadium	Fiji	26–0	New Zealand	Australia	Sri Lanka	No competition
1985	Government Stadium	Australia	24–10	(United Kingdom); Public School Wanderers	Tonga	Hong Kong	No competition
1986	Government Stadium	New Zealand	32–12	(France); French Barbarians	United States	Papua New Guinea	No competition
1987	Government Stadium	New Zealand	12–6	Fiji	(France); French Barbarians	Hong Kong	No competition
1988	Government Stadium	Australia	13–12	New Zealand	United States	Chinese Taipei	No competition
1989	Government Stadium	New Zealand	22–10	Australia	Tonga	Netherlands	No competition
1990	Government Stadium	Fiji	22–10	New Zealand	Hong Kong	West Germany	No competition
1991	Government Stadium	Fiji	18–14	New Zealand	Argentina	South Korea	No competition
1992	Government Stadium	Fiji	22–6	New Zealand	Hong Kong	Romania	No competition
1993	Government Stadium	Western Samoa	14–12	Fiji	Tonga	Romania	No competition
1994	Hong Kong Stadium	New Zealand	32–20	Australia	South Korea	Hong Kong	No competition
1995	Hong Kong Stadium	New Zealand	35–17	Fiji	Canada	Hong Kong	No competition
1996	Hong Kong Stadium	New Zealand	19–17	Fiji	France	Japan	No competition
1997; World Cup	Hong Kong Stadium	Fiji	24–21	South Africa	Tonga	United States	No competition
1998	Hong Kong Stadium	Fiji	28–19	Western Samoa	South Korea	Morocco	No competition
1999	Hong Kong Stadium	Fiji	21–12	New Zealand	Japan	Hong Kong	No competition
2000	Hong Kong Stadium	New Zealand	31–5	Fiji	France	Ireland	No competition
2001	Hong Kong Stadium	New Zealand	29–5	Fiji	United States	Hong Kong	No competition
2002	Hong Kong Stadium	England	33–20	Fiji	South Africa	Morocco	No competition
2003	Hong Kong Stadium	England	22–17	New Zealand	Canada	United States	No competition
2004	Hong Kong Stadium	England	22–12	Argentina	Scotland	Cook Islands	No competition
2005; World Cup	Hong Kong Stadium	Fiji	29–19	New Zealand	Portugal	Italy	No competition
2006	Hong Kong Stadium	England	26–24	Fiji	Wales	China	No competition
2007	Hong Kong Stadium	Samoa	27–22	Fiji	Wales	Russia	No competition
2008	Hong Kong Stadium	New Zealand	26–12	South Africa	France	Russia	No competition
2009	Hong Kong Stadium	Fiji	26–24	South Africa	Tonga	Portugal	No competition
2010	Hong Kong Stadium	Samoa	24–21	New Zealand	Australia	Canada	Hong Kong
2011	Hong Kong Stadium	New Zealand	29–17	England	South Africa	Canada	Kenya
2012	Hong Kong Stadium	Fiji	35–28	New Zealand	Samoa	Kenya	Canada
2013	Hong Kong Stadium	Fiji	26–19	Wales	Samoa	England	France
2014	Hong Kong Stadium	New Zealand	26–7	England	South Africa	Scotland	Kenya
2015	Hong Kong Stadium	Fiji	33–19	New Zealand	Australia	Scotland	Kenya
2016	Hong Kong Stadium	Fiji	21–7	New Zealand	England	Argentina	Russia
2017	Hong Kong Stadium	Fiji	22–0	South Africa	New Zealand	Scotland	Japan
2018	Hong Kong Stadium	Fiji	24–12	Kenya	Argentina	France	Wales
2019	Hong Kong Stadium	Fiji	21–7	France	Argentina	Scotland	Spain
World Series tournaments in Hong Kong for men's teams were cancelled in 2020 and 2021 due to impacts of the COVID-19 pandemic.
2022	Hong Kong Stadium	Australia	20–17	Fiji	Argentina	New Zealand	Uruguay
2023	Hong Kong Stadium	New Zealand	24–19	Fiji	Argentina	Ireland	Hong Kong
2024	Hong Kong Stadium	New Zealand	10–7	France	Fiji	Argentina	Hong Kong
2025	Kai Tak Stadium	Argentina	12–7	France	Australia	Fiji	Hong Kong
2026	Kai Tak Stadium	South Africa	35–7	Argentina	Fiji	Uruguay	Hong Kong

=== Women's tournament ===
Year	Venue	Cup			Melrose Claymore		
Year	Venue	Winner	Final Score	Runner-up	Winner	Final Score	Runner-up
2023	Hong Kong Stadium	New Zealand	26–17	Australia	Not held		
2024	Hong Kong Stadium	New Zealand	36–7	United States	China	24–10	Hong Kong
2025	Kai Tak Stadium	New Zealand	26–19	Australia	Hong Kong	45–5	Kazakhstan
2026	Kai Tak Stadium	New Zealand	36–7	Australia	Denmark	17–14	Thailand

== All-time results ==
Team	Champions	Finalists	Plates	Bowls	Shields (Melrose since 2023)
Fiji	19	31	1	1	
New Zealand	13	24		1	
Australia	6	9	4		
England	4	6	1	1	
Samoa	3	5	2		
South Africa	1	5	3		
Argentina	1	3	5	2	
(United Kingdom) Barbarian F.C.	1				
(New Zealand) Cantabrians	1				
France		3	3	1	1
Wales		1	2		
(France) French Barbarians		1	1		
(Australia) Wallaroos		1			
(New Zealand) Marlborough		1			
(New Zealand) Manawatu		1			
(Scotland) Co-Optimists		1			
(Scotland) Scottish Border Club		1			
(United Kingdom) Public School Wanderers		1			
Kenya		1			
Tonga			7		
South Korea			4	1	
Hong Kong/Hong Kong			3	6	6
United States			3	2	
Canada			2	2	1
Japan			2	1	1
Scotland			1	3	
Portugal			1	1	
Papua New Guinea			1	1	
Ireland				2	
Romania				2	
Russia				2	
Morocco				2	
Kenya				1	3
Chinese Taipei				1	
Sri Lanka				1	
West Germany				1	
Cook Islands				1	
Italy				1	
China				1	
Netherlands				1	
Uruguay					1

== Qualifier results ==
Since 2014, the Hong Kong Sevens has also featured a qualifying competition where the winner is promoted to "core team" status for the World Rugby Sevens Series the following season.

Tournament	Winner (Qualified)	Final score	Runner-up	Semi-finalists
2014	Japan	26–5	Italy	Russia; Hong Kong
2015	Russia	22–19	Zimbabwe	Spain; Papua New Guinea
2016	Japan	24–14	Hong Kong	Germany; Zimbabwe
2017	Spain	12–7	Germany	Papua New Guinea; Chile
2018	Japan	19–14	Germany	Ireland; Chile
2019	Ireland	28–7	Hong Kong	Germany; Chile

== Players ==
At each Hong Kong Sevens since 1980, the player who "most exemplifies the spirit and skills needed in rugby sevens" has received 'The Leslie Williams Award for Best and Fairest Player'. It is named for the late Leslie Williams, who lived in Hong Kong from 1955 to 1971 and played for Hong Kong Football Club and the national team. The trophy has been awarded every year since 1980 with the exception of the Rugby World Cup Sevens in 1997 and 2005 when there was a different individual award. Fijian legend Waisale Serevi is the only player to have won the Leslie Williams Trophy three times and he was also named Player of the Tournament at both RWC events.

=== Young talent ===
For New Zealand, Jonah Lomu, Christian Cullen, Zinzan Brooke, John Schuster, Rodney So'oialo, Joe Rokocoko, Mils Muliaina and Rico Gear were first introduced to the international game of Sevens. For Australia, former captain George Gregan first demonstrated his ability at the Hong Kong Sevens in the same team as Joe Roff and Ben Tune. For Wales, Jamie Roberts and James Hook are among those who went on to the 15-man national team after playing in the Hong Kong Sevens. South Africa, also, have seen Jean de Villiers, Bryan Habana, Ricky Januarie, Brent Russell and Kabamba Floors showcase their variety of skills at the event.

== See also ==
- Hong Kong Women's Sevens
- Singer Sri Lankan Airlines Rugby 7's
- Rugby Sevens
- World Rugby Sevens Series
- World Rugby Women's Sevens Series
- Rugby World Cup Sevens
