= 2007 Singer Sri Lankan Airlines Rugby 7s =

Tournament details
- Countries: 10
- Tournament format(s): Knockout
- Date: 8–9 September 2007

Tournament statistics
- Teams: 10
- Matches played: 25

Final
- Venue: Bogambara Stadium
- Champions: Hong Kong
- Runners-up: South Korea

The 2007 Singer Sri Lankan Airlines Rugby 7s was the ninth year of the Singer Sri Lankan Airlines Rugby 7s tournament. The competition was held in Kandy. The top seeded team Japan and the Arabian Gulf team withdrawing prior to the competition. In the final of the Cup Hong Kong defeated South Korea 37 points to five, and in the Plate final China were successful against Thailand, 34 points to nil.

== First round ==
Key to colours in group tables
Teams advanced to the Cup quarter-final
Teams advanced to the Plate semi-final
Teams advanced to the Bowl final

=== Pool A ===
- South Korea 33–10 Sri Lanka
- Kazakhstan 45–19 Cambodia
- South Korea 36–5 Thailand
- Thailand 45–0 Cambodia
- South Korea 47–12 Kazakhstan
- Sri Lanka 28–12 Kazakhstan
- South Korea 55–0 Cambodia
- Thailand 17–17 Kazakhstan
- Sri Lanka 47–0 Cambodia
- Sri Lanka Won–Lost Thailand

Teams	Pld	W	D	L	PF	PA	+/−	Pts
South Korea	4	4	0	0	171	27	+144	12
Sri Lanka	4	3	0	1	?	?	?	10
Thailand	4	1	1	2	?	?	?	7
Kazakhstan	4	1	1	2	86	111	−25	7
Cambodia	4	0	0	4	19	192	−173	4

=== Pool B ===
- China 24–15 Chinese Taipei
- Malaysia 50–0 India
- Hong Kong 15–12 China
- Hong Kong 59–0 India
- Malaysia 15–12 China
- Malaysia 19–12 Chinese Taipei
- China 41–0 India
- Hong Kong 33–0 Malaysia
- Chinese Taipei 19–5 India
- Hong Kong Won–Lost Chinese Taipei

Teams	Pld	W	D	L	PF	PA	+/−	Pts
Hong Kong	4	4	0	0	?	?	?	12
Malaysia	4	3	0	1	84	24	+60	10
China	4	2	0	2	89	45	+44	8
Chinese Taipei	4	1	0	3	?	?	?	6
India	4	0	0	4	5	169	−164	4

== Second round ==
=== Bowl ===
Final
India	36
Cambodia	5

=== Plate ===
Semi-finals
China	45
Kazakhstan	0
Thailand	7
Chinese Taipei	5

Final
China	34
Thailand	0

=== Cup ===
Semi-finals
Hong Kong	21
Sri Lanka	14
South Korea	14
Chinese Taipei	12

Final
Hong Kong	37
South Korea	5
