= 1999 Singer Sri Lankan Airlines Rugby 7s =

Singer Sri Lankan Airlines (1999) rugby

Tournament details
- Tournament format(s): Knockout

Tournament statistics

Final
- Venue: Bogambara Stadium
- Champions: South Korea
- Runners-up: Chinese Taipei

The 1999 Singer Sri Lankan Airlines Rugby 7s was the first year of the Singer Sri Lankan Airlines Rugby 7s tournament. South Korea defeated Chinese Taipei, 38–7, in the final of the Cup.

The competition was initiated as a part of the Kandy Sports Club 125-year anniversary celebrations, with ten Asian national rugby sevens teams taking part. The tournament was held over two days at the Bogambara Stadium in Kandy.

== First round ==
Key to colours in group tables
Teams advanced to the Cup quarter-final
Teams advanced to the Plate semi-final
Teams advanced to the Bowl final

=== Pool A ===
- Japan 33–0 Sri Lanka
- Chinese Taipei 28–12 Sri Lanka
- Sri Lanka 49–7 Thailand
- Sri Lanka 21–7 Malaysia
- Chinese Taipei 12–7 Japan
- Chinese Taipei 40–7 Thailand
- Chinese Taipei 26–7 Malaysia
- Japan 48–5 Malaysia
- Malaysia 40–12 Thailand
- Japan 56–0 Thailand

Teams	Pld	W	D	L	PF	PA	+/−	Pts
Chinese Taipei	4	4	0	0	106	33	+73	12
Japan	4	3	0	1	144	17	+127	10
Sri Lanka	4	2	0	2	82	75	+7	8
Malaysia	4	1	0	3	59	107	−48	6
Thailand	4	0	0	4	26	185	−159	4

=== Pool B ===
- South Korea 40–0 China
- Hong Kong 29–12 China
- China 19–12 Singapore
- China 36–0 India
- South Korea 38–19 Hong Kong
- Singapore 21–19 Hong Kong
- South Korea 47–7 India
- Hong Kong 33–0 India
- Singapore 14–14 India
- South Korea 40–0 Singapore

Teams	Pld	W	D	L	PF	PA	+/−	Pts
South Korea	4	4	0	0	165	26	+139	12
Hong Kong	4	2	0	2	100	71	+29	8
China	4	2	0	2	67	81	−14	8
Singapore	4	1	1	2	47	92	−45	7
India	4	0	1	3	21	130	−109	5

== Second round ==
=== Bowl ===
Final
India	47
Thailand	31

=== Plate ===
Semi-finals
Sri Lanka	50
Singapore	0
Malaysia	22
China	21

Final
Malaysia	27
Sri Lanka	26

=== Cup ===
Semi-finals
Chinese Taipei	19
Hong Kong	8
South Korea	12
Japan	7

Final
South Korea	38
Chinese Taipei	7
