= 2003 Singer Sri Lankan Airlines Rugby 7s =

Tournament details
- Countries: 16
- Tournament format(s): Knockout
- Date: 5–7 September 2003

Tournament statistics
- Teams: 16
- Matches played: 37

Final
- Venue: Bogambara Stadium
- Champions: Kenya
- Runners-up: Portugal

The 2003 Singer Sri Lankan Airlines Rugby 7s was the fifth year that the Singer Sri Lankan Airlines Rugby 7s tournament was held and was the first year that teams from Africa (Kenya, Morocco and the Arabian Gulf) and Oceania (Australia, New Zealand and the Cook Islands) participated. Kenya defeated Portugal 16 points to 12 in the Cup final, with Arabian Gulf winning the Bowl and host nation, Sri Lanka, winning the Plate.

== First round ==
Key to colours in group tables
Teams advanced to the Cup quarter-final
Teams advanced to the Plate semi-final
Teams advanced to the Bowl semi-final

=== Pool A ===
- Morocco 12–0 (Cooperation Council for the Arab States of the Gulf) Arabian Gulf
- Kenya 31–7 (Cooperation Council for the Arab States of the Gulf) Arabian Gulf
- Kenya 40–0 Morocco
- New Zealand Centurions 21–12 Kenya
- New Zealand Centurions 42–0 (Cooperation Council for the Arab States of the Gulf) Arabian Gulf
- New Zealand Centurions 47–0 Morocco

Teams	Pld	W	D	L	PF	PA	+/−	Pts
New Zealand Centurions	3	3	0	0	110	12	+98	9
Kenya	3	2	0	1	83	28	+55	7
Morocco	3	1	0	2	12	87	−75	5
(Cooperation Council for the Arab States of the Gulf) Arabian Gulf	3	0	0	3	7	85	−78	3

=== Pool B ===
- Belgium 38–7 Singapore
- Cook Islands 62–0 Singapore
- Cook Islands 33–5 Belgium
- Portugal 31–19 Cook Islands
- Portugal 38–7 Belgium
- Portugal 52–0 Singapore

Teams	Pld	W	D	L	PF	PA	+/−	Pts
Portugal	3	3	0	0	121	26	+95	9
Cook Islands	3	2	0	1	114	36	+78	7
Belgium	3	1	0	2	50	78	−28	5
Singapore	3	0	0	3	7	152	−145	3

=== Pool C ===
- Germany 54–0 Malaysia
- South Korea 59–0 Malaysia
- South Korea 35–0 Germany
- Hong Kong 28–14 South Korea
- Hong Kong 45–0 Malaysia
- Hong Kong 12–10 Germany

Teams	Pld	W	D	L	PF	PA	+/−	Pts
Hong Kong	3	3	0	0	85	24	+61	9
South Korea	3	2	0	1	108	28	+80	7
Germany	3	1	0	2	64	47	+17	5
Malaysia	3	0	0	3	0	158	−158	3

=== Pool D ===
- Sri Lanka 31–5 Denmark
- Australia Potoroos 19–7 Sri Lanka
- Australia Potoroos 21–14 Denmark
- Chinese Taipei 35–7 Sri Lanka
- Chinese Taipei 26–19 Australia Potoroos
- Chinese Taipei 12–7 Denmark

Teams	Pld	W	D	L	PF	PA	+/−	Pts
Chinese Taipei	3	3	0	0	73	33	+40	9
Australia Potoroos	3	2	0	1	59	47	+12	7
Sri Lanka	3	1	0	2	45	59	−14	5
Denmark	3	0	0	3	26	64	−38	3

== Second round ==
=== Bowl ===
Semi-finals
(Cooperation Council for the Arab States of the Gulf) Arabian Gulf	24
Singapore	19
Denmark	19
Malaysia	7

Final
(Cooperation Council for the Arab States of the Gulf) Arabian Gulf	28
Denmark	19

=== Plate ===
Semi-finals
Sri Lanka	26
Germany	19
Morocco	5
Belgium	10

Final
Sri Lanka	33
Belgium	19

=== Cup ===
Quarter-finals
Cook Islands	31
Chinese Taipei	15
Kenya	36
Hong Kong	12
Portugal	52
Australia Potoroos	0
New Zealand Centurions	27
South Korea	7

Semi-finals
Kenya	43
Cook Islands	5
Portugal	21
New Zealand Centurions	12

Final
Kenya	16
Portugal	12
