= Thailand national rugby sevens team =

Thailand
- Union: Thai Rugby Union

First international
- Thailand 4–24 New Zealand; 1976 Hong Kong Sevens

Largest win
- Thailand 37–0 Saudi Arabia; 2023 Asia Rugby Men’s Sevens Trophy

World Cup Sevens
- Appearances: 0
- Best result: Did not qualify

The Thailand national rugby sevens team is a minor national sevens side. They have competed in the Hong Kong Sevens since the 1980s.

== Sri Lanka Rugby 7s ==
Year	Cup	Plate	Bowl
1999	South Korea	Malaysia	India
2000	Chinese Taipei	Japan	Thailand
2001	Chinese Taipei	Denmark	Czech Republic
2002	Portugal	South Korea	Hong Kong
2003	Kenya	Sri Lanka	Arabian Gulf
2004	Japan	Sri Lanka	Kazakhstan
2005	Japan	Sri Lanka	Arabian Gulf
2006	South Korea	Thailand	Malaysia
2007	Hong Kong	China	India
2008			

== Rugby at the 1998 Asian Games ==
Group B matches -

Team	Pts	Pld	W	L	PW	PL
Japan	6	2	2	0	73	5
Thailand	4	2	1	1	33	45
Hong Kong	2	2	0	2	12	68

December 7

Japan	40 – 0	Hong Kong
Japan	33 – 5	Thailand
Thailand	28 – 12	Hong Kong

Semi-finals
December 8
South Korea	28
Thailand	10
December 8
Japan	14
Chinese Taipei	0

Final
December 8
South Korea	29
Japan	14
Third place
December 8
Thailand	19
Chinese Taipei	5

== Rugby at the 2002 Asian Games ==
Group A matches -

Team	Pts	Pld	W	L	PW	PL
South Korea	9	3	3	0	115	24
Thailand	7	3	2	1	62	47
Sri Lanka	5	3	1	2	33	89
Malaysia	3	3	0	3	24	74

September 30

South Korea	31 – 5	Malaysia
Thailand	26 – 7	Sri Lanka
Malaysia	5 – 24	Thailand
South Korea	49 – 7	Sri Lanka
South Korea	35 – 12	Thailand
Malaysia	14 – 19	Sri Lanka

Semi-finals
October 1
South Korea	24
Japan	7
October 1
Chinese Taipei	19
Thailand	0

Final
October 1
South Korea	33
Chinese Taipei	21
Third place
October 1
Japan	14
Thailand	17

== See also ==
- Rugby union in Thailand
