= Malaysia national rugby sevens team =

Malaysia
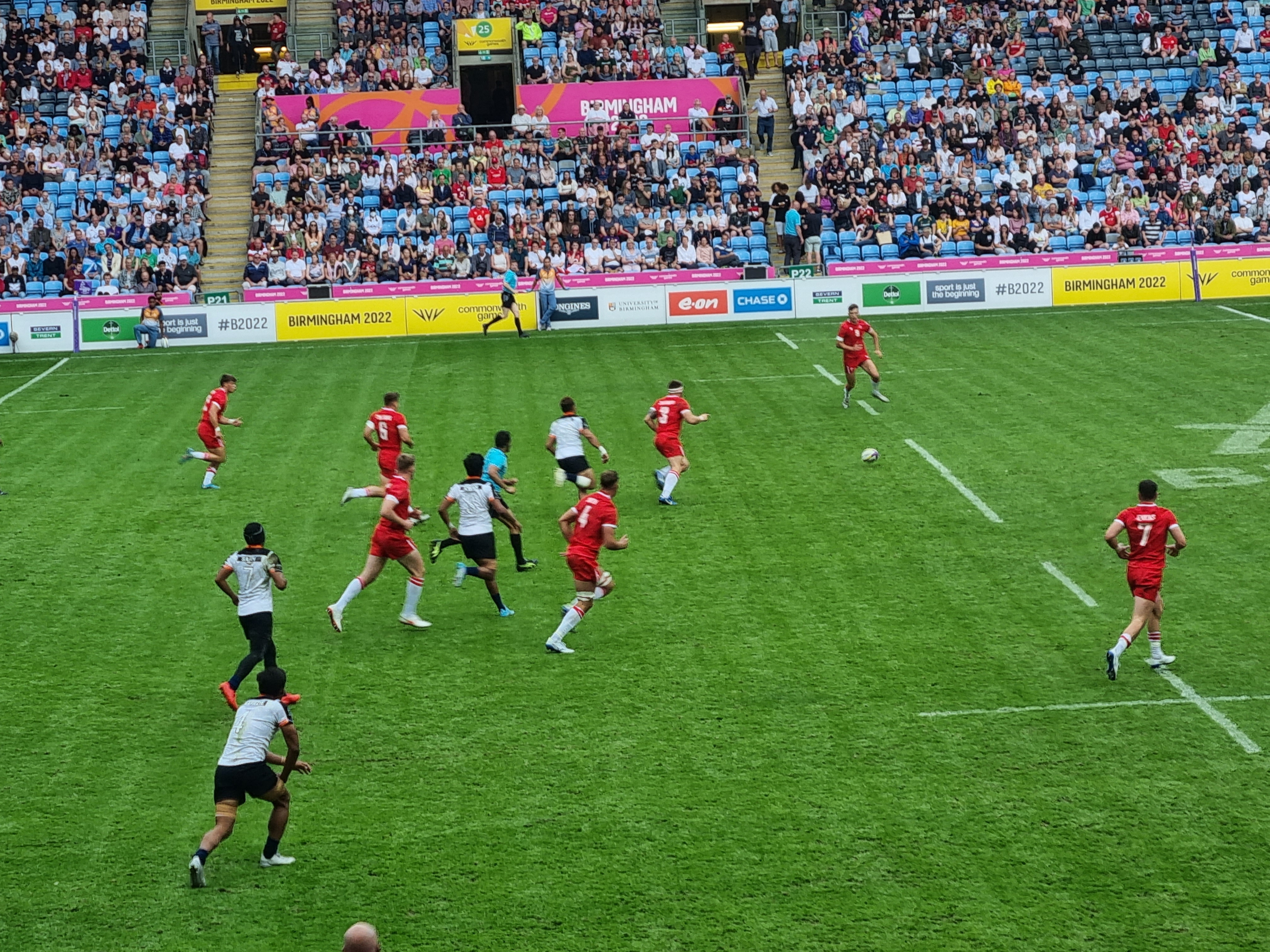
- Wales playing Malaysia at the 2022 Commonwealth Games
- Union: Malaysia Rugby Union
- Coach: John Walters

World Cup Sevens
- Appearances: (First in 1993)
- Best result: 5th (1997)

The Malaysia national rugby sevens team is a minor national sevens side. They have competed in the Hong Kong Sevens since the 1980s.Malaysia also qualified for the 2010 Commonwealth Games.

== Tournament history ==
=== Rugby World Cup Sevens ===
World Cup record
Year	Round	Position	Pld	W	L	D
1993–2022	Did not qualify					
Total	Titles	0/8	0	0	0	0

=== Commonwealth Games ===
Commonwealth Games record
Year	Round	Position	Pld	W	L	D
(Malaysia) 1998	Plate Semi-finalist	11th	4	2	2	0
(England) 2002	Bowl Quarter-finalist	13th	4	1	3	0
(Australia) 2006	Did not qualify					
(India) 2010	Bowl Quarter-finalist	13th	4	0	4	0
(Scotland) 2014	Shield Semi-finalist	15th	5	0	5	0
(Australia) 2018	Group stage	13th	3	0	3	0
(England) 2022	13th–16th Place Playoff	=15th	5	0	5	0
Total	0 Titles	6/7	25	3	22	0

=== Asian Games ===
Asian Games record
Year	Position
(Thailand) 1998	-
(South Korea) 2002	7th
(Qatar) 2006	-
(China) 2010	5th
(South Korea) 2014	9th
(Indonesia) 2018

=== Southeast Asian Games ===
Southeast Asian Games record
Year	Position
(Singapore) 2015	2nd
(Malaysia) 2017	1st

== Sri Lanka Rugby 7s ==
Year	Cup	Plate	Bowl
1999	South Korea	Malaysia	India
2000	Chinese Taipei	Japan	Thailand
2001	Chinese Taipei	Denmark	Czech Republic
2002	Portugal	South Korea	Hong Kong
2003	Kenya	Sri Lanka	Arabian Gulf
2004	Japan	Sri Lanka	Kazakhstan
2005	Japan	Sri Lanka	Arabian Gulf
2006	South Korea	Thailand	Malaysia
2007	Hong Kong	China	India
2008			

== Rugby at the 2002 Asian Games ==
Group A matches -

Team	Pts	Pld	W	L	PW	PL
South Korea	9	3	3	0	115	24
Thailand	7	3	2	1	62	47
Sri Lanka	5	3	1	2	33	89
Malaysia	3	3	0	3	24	74

September 30

South Korea	31 – 5	Malaysia
Thailand	26 – 7	Sri Lanka
Malaysia	5 – 24	Thailand
South Korea	49 – 7	Sri Lanka
South Korea	35 – 12	Thailand
Malaysia	14 – 19	Sri Lanka

== Squad ==
=== Current squad ===
Squad to 2017 Southeast Asian Games

- Mohamad Khairul Abdillah bin Ramli
- Mohamad Nur Azri bin Azmi
- Mohamad Safwan bin Abdullah
- Muhamad Firdaus bin Tarmizi
- Muhammad Ameer Nasrun Zulkeffli
- Muhammad Siddiq Amir bin Jalil
- Muhammad Zulhisham bin Rasli
- Muhd Azwan Zuwairi bin Mat Zizi
- Muhd Dzafran Asyraaf bin Muhd Zainudin
- Nik Mohd Shahiddan bin Mohd Zain
- Wan Izzuddin bin Ismail
- Zulkiflee bin Azmi

=== Past squad ===
Squad to 2014 Asian Games:

- Anwarrul Aswad Ahmad
- Anwarul Hafiz Ahmad
- Dinesvaran Krishnan
- Syafril Yasmin
- Mohd Fairuz Abdul Rahman
- Mohd Izwan Abu Bakar
- Muhammad Ameer Nasrun Zulkeffli
- Muhammad Danial Noor Hamidi
- Muhammad Faridzal Ismail
- Muhammad Hanafi Zaini
- Nazuriddin Abdul Latiff
- Wanizzuddin Ismail
- Zulkiflee Azmi
