= Sri Lanka national rugby sevens team =

Sri Lankan men's rugby sevens team

Sri Lanka Sevens
- Union: Sri Lanka Rugby Football Union
- Nickname: Tuskers
- Coach: Peter Woods
- Captain: Srinath Sooriyabandara

World Cup Sevens
- Appearances: no

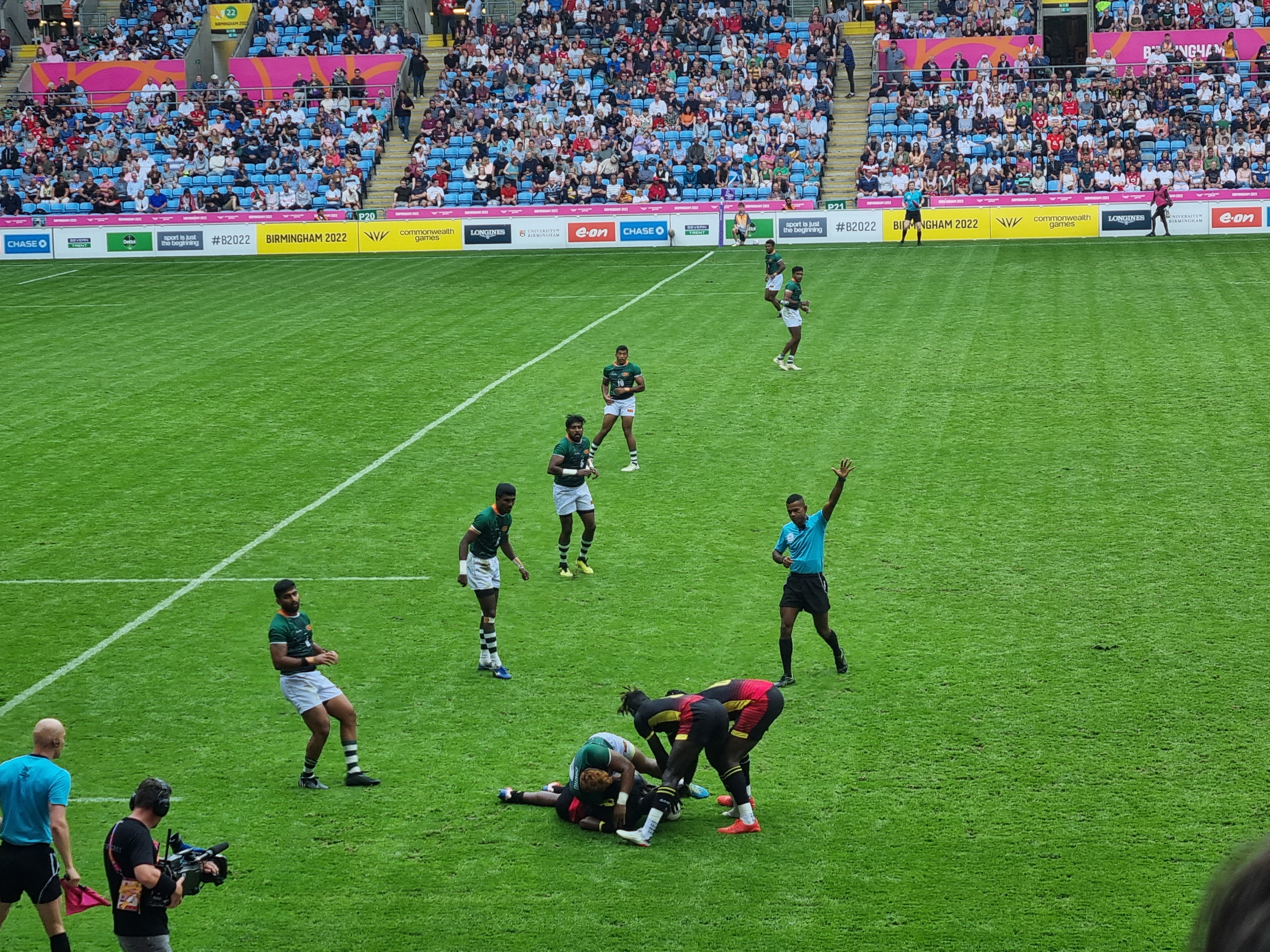
Sri Lanka vs Uganda at the 2022 Commonwealth Games.

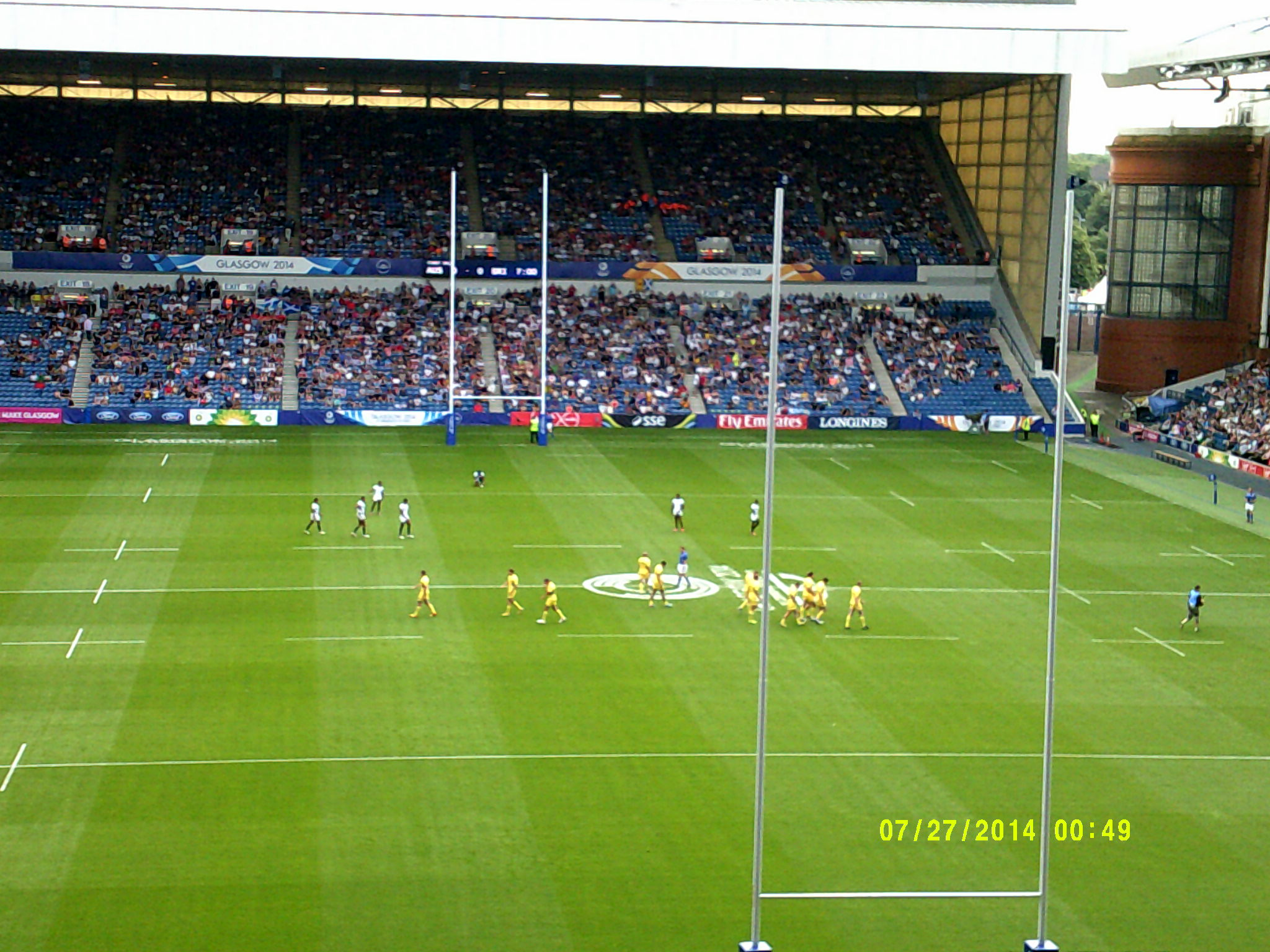
Australia playing Sri Lanka at the 2014 Commonwealth Games.

The Sri Lanka national rugby sevens team, also known as the Tuskers, represents Sri Lanka in men's international rugby sevens. The team is administered by Sri Lanka Rugby and competes in Asian and international sevens competitions, including the Asian Games, Commonwealth Games and regional tournaments.

Sri Lanka has a long history in Asian sevens rugby and has competed at the Hong Kong Sevens since the 1980s. In 1989, rugby commentator Bill McLaren referred to Sri Lanka's Hong Kong Sevens side, mentioning players such as Kothalawala, Ekanayake and Lakshantha.

== History ==
=== Early international sevens ===
Sri Lanka became a regular participant in Asian invitational sevens tournaments during the late twentieth century, particularly through appearances at the Hong Kong Sevens. The team also participated in multi-sport events after rugby sevens was introduced to the Asian Games and Commonwealth Games programmes.

=== Asian and Commonwealth Games ===
Sri Lanka has competed in every Asian Games rugby sevens tournament since the sport appeared at the Games in 1998. The team's best Asian Games finishes came in 2014 and 2018, when Sri Lanka reached the semi-finals and finished fourth.

The team has also appeared in every Commonwealth Games men's rugby sevens tournament from 1998 to 2022. Sri Lanka recorded its first Commonwealth Games sevens wins at the 2014 Commonwealth Games in Glasgow, finishing 13th.

=== 2026 CASA Rugby Sevens title ===
In May 2026, Sri Lanka won the men's title at the inaugural Central Asia and South Asia Rugby Sevens tournament, commonly known as the CASA 7s, held in Tashkent, Uzbekistan. The competition was scheduled for 16–17 May 2026 and was sanctioned by Asia Rugby and World Rugby.

Six men's teams took part: Sri Lanka, India, Uzbekistan, Pakistan, Mongolia and Kyrgyzstan. Sri Lanka went unbeaten in the league stage, defeating Kyrgyzstan 54–5, Mongolia 43–5, Pakistan 41–0, Uzbekistan 29–5 and India 33–12.

In the final, Sri Lanka defeated India 31–10 to become the first men's CASA Sevens champions. The victory was part of a Sri Lankan double at the tournament, as the Sri Lanka women's team also won the women's title by defeating Kazakhstan 27–0 in its final.

=== 2026 Howard Hinton Sevens Shield title ===
Later in May 2026, Sri Lanka travelled to France for the Howard Hinton Sevens tournament, with the tour described as part of the team's preparations for upcoming Asian Sevens competitions and the 2026 Asian Games in Japan.

Sri Lanka won the Shield Championship at the tournament after defeating Pyla Sevens Rugby 28–21 in the Shield final. The team had trailed 7–21 at half-time before scoring three unanswered converted tries in the second half. Earlier, Sri Lanka defeated Euskadi 22–15 in the Shield semi-final, after losing 24–19 to Mauritius in the Bowl qualification match.

=== Peter Woods return ===
In June 2026, Sri Lanka Rugby appointed New Zealander Peter Woods as head coach of the national sevens team ahead of the Asian Sevens Series in Sri Lanka and China and the Asian Games in Japan. Woods had previously coached the Sri Lanka sevens team from 2016 to 2018, including during the Commonwealth Games and Asian Games cycle.

== Players ==
=== 2026 Howard Hinton Sevens squad ===
Sri Lanka named a 12-member touring squad for the 2026 Howard Hinton Sevens in France. Srinath Sooriyabandara captained the side, with Janidu Dilshan named vice-captain.

- Srinath Sooriyabandara
- Janidu Dilshan
- Chathura Widanalage
- Akash Madusanka
- Kavindu De Costa
- Kavindu Perera
- Ramitha Himash
- Ravindu Anjula
- Suranga Thennakoon
- Diluksha Dange
- Gayan Perera
- Chemod Muthunayaka

== Tournament history ==
=== Summer Olympics ===
Olympic Games record
Year	Round	Position	Pld	W	L	D
(Brazil) 2016	Did not qualify					
(Japan) 2020	Did not qualify					
(France) 2024	Did not qualify					
Total	0 titles	0/3	-	-	-	-

=== Asian Games ===
Asian Games record
Year	Round	Position	Pld	W	L	D
(Thailand) 1998	Group stage	7th	3	0	3	0
(South Korea) 2002	Classification	6th	4	1	3	0
(Qatar) 2006	Classification	6th	3	1	2	0
(China) 2010	Quarter-finalist	6th	6	2	4	0
(South Korea) 2014	Semi-finalist	4th	6	3	3	0
(Indonesia) 2018	Semi-finalist	4th	6	3	3	0
(China) 2022	Classification (Note: Sri Lanka competed as neutral athletes under the Olympic Council of Asia flag.)	10th	6	3	3	0
Total	Semi-finalist	7/7	34	13	21	0

=== Commonwealth Games ===
Commonwealth Games record
Year	Round	Position	Pld	W	L	D
(Malaysia) 1998	Plate finals	14th	4	0	4	0
(England) 2002	Bowl quarter-finals	=13th	4	0	4	0
(Australia) 2006	Bowl quarter-finals	=13th	4	0	4	0
(India) 2010	Bowl quarter-finals	=13th	4	0	4	0
(Scotland) 2014	Shield final	13th	6	2	4	0
(Australia) 2018	Pool stage	15th	3	0	3	0
(England) 2022	13th-place play-off	14th	6	1	5	0
Total	0 titles	7/7	31	3	28	0

=== Hong Kong Sevens ===
Sri Lanka has participated in the Hong Kong Sevens since the 1980s. In 1984, Sri Lanka won the Bowl competition at the tournament, while Fiji defeated New Zealand in the Cup final.

Year	Result	Notes
1984	Bowl winner	Sri Lanka won the Bowl competition.
2007	Pool stage	Sri Lanka played in Pool A with Fiji, Scotland and Portugal.
2008	Pool stage	Sri Lanka played in Pool B with England, Samoa and Canada.
2009	Pool stage	Sri Lanka played in Pool C with New Zealand, Australia and Zimbabwe.
2014	Pool stage	Sri Lanka played in Pool A with Fiji, Wales and Kenya.

=== Sri Lanka Rugby Sevens ===
Year	Cup	Plate	Bowl
1999	South Korea	Malaysia	India
2000	Chinese Taipei	Japan	Thailand
2001	Chinese Taipei	Denmark	Czech Republic
2002	Portugal	South Korea	Hong Kong
2003	Kenya	Sri Lanka	(Cooperation Council for the Arab States of the Gulf) Arabian Gulf
2004	Japan	Sri Lanka	Kazakhstan
2005	Japan	Sri Lanka	(Cooperation Council for the Arab States of the Gulf) Arabian Gulf
2006	South Korea	Thailand	Malaysia
2007	Hong Kong	China	India
2008	Malaysia	Kazakhstan	Singapore
2009	Japan	Thailand	Pakistan
2010	Fiji Barbarians	New Zealand Legends	Germany
2015	Japan	South Korea	United Arab Emirates
2016	Hong Kong	Japan	—

=== CASA Rugby Sevens ===
Year	Host	Result	Final	Notes
2026	Tashkent, Uzbekistan	Champions	Sri Lanka 31–10 India	Inaugural CASA 7s men's tournament; Sri Lanka finished unbeaten.

=== Howard Hinton Sevens ===
Year	Host	Result	Key matches	Notes
2026	France	Shield champions	Shield final: Sri Lanka 28–21 Pyla Sevens Rugby; Shield semi-final: Sri Lanka 22–15 Euskadi; Bowl qualifier: Sri Lanka 19–24 Mauritius	Sri Lanka won the Shield Championship after recovering from a 7–21 half-time deficit in the final.

== See also ==
- Sri Lanka national rugby union team
- Sri Lanka women's national rugby sevens team
- Rugby union in Sri Lanka
