= Chinese Taipei national rugby sevens team =

Chinese Taipei
- Union: Chinese Taipei Rugby Football Union

Largest win
- Chinese Taipei 82 – 0 Qatar; 2006 Asian Games (Dec 10)

World Cup Sevens
- Appearances: 3 (First in 1993)

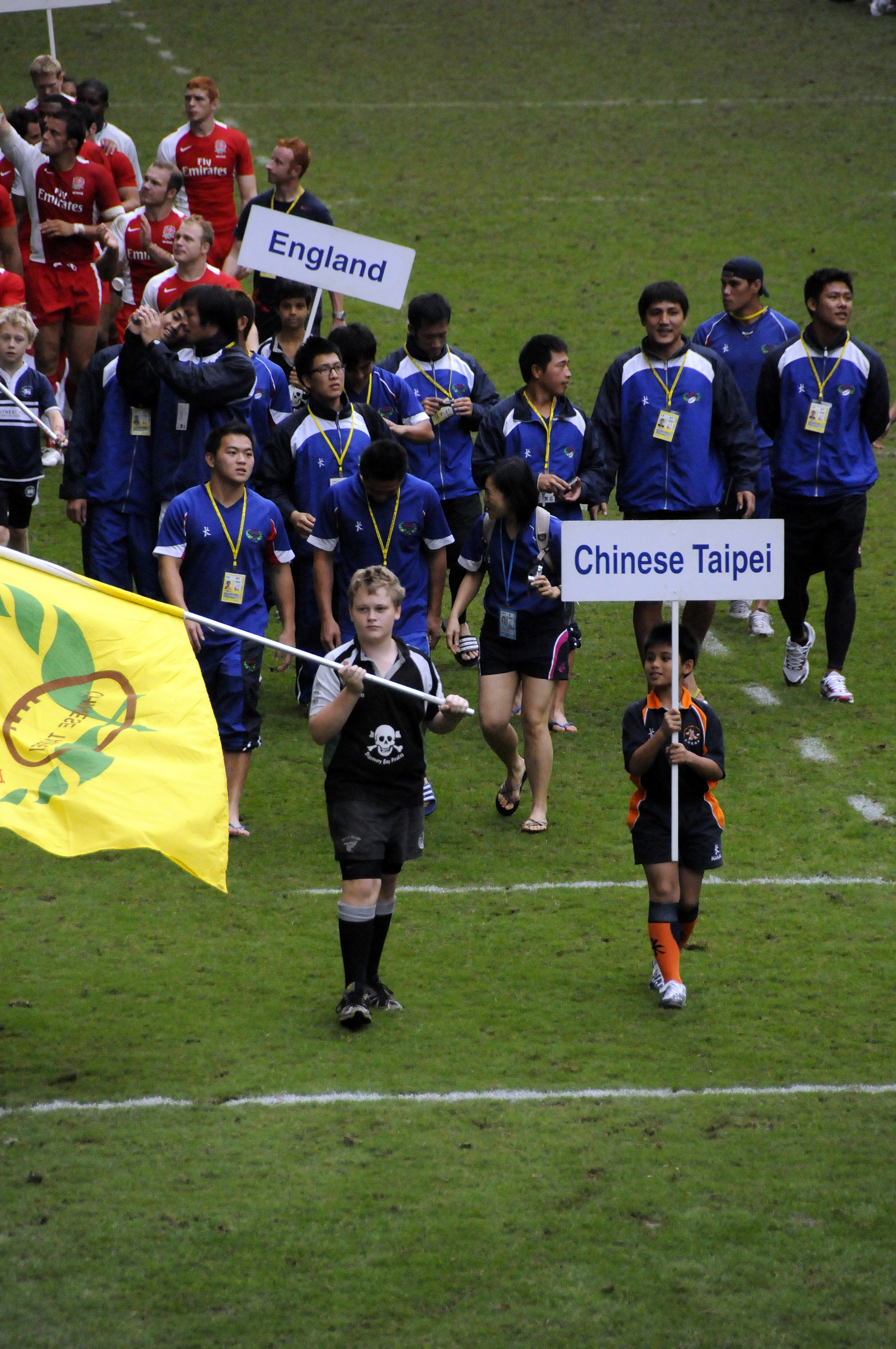
Chinese Taipei Sevens Rugby Team

The Chinese Taipei national rugby sevens team is a minor national sevens side. They have competed in the Hong Kong Sevens since the 1980s. In 1989, veteran rugby commentator Bill McLaren mentions them in an article on the Hong Kong Sevens, saying that their team had two Chi-Mings, a Yen-Ching, and a Chijen-Shuen, and that he was grateful that he did not have to broadcast all the names, as he had trouble remembering them.

== Record ==
=== Summer Olympics ===
Olympic Games record
Year	Round	Position	Pld	W	D	L
(Brazil) 2016	did not qualify					
(Japan) 2020	did not qualify					
(France) 2024	did not qualify					
Total	0 Titles	0/3	-	-	-	-

=== Rugby World Cup Sevens ===
Year	Round	Position	Pld	W	D	L
(Scotland) 1993	Group stage	21st	5	0	0	5
(Hong Kong) 1997	did not qualify					
(Argentina) 2001	Bowl	21st	6	0	0	6
(Hong Kong) 2005	Bowl	21st	6	1	0	5
(United Arab Emirates) 2009	did not qualify					
(Russia) 2013	did not qualify					
(United States) 2018	did not qualify					
(South Africa) 2022	did not qualify					
Total	0 Titles	3/8	17	1	0	16

=== Hong Kong Sevens ===
Year	Venue	Cup			Plate	
Year	Venue	Winner	Final Score	Runner-up	Winner	Runner-up
1988; Details	Government Stadium	Australia	13-12	New Zealand	United States	Chinese Taipei

=== Sri Lanka Rugby 7s ===
Year	Cup	Plate	Bowl
1999	South Korea	Malaysia	India
2000	Chinese Taipei	Japan	Thailand
2001	Chinese Taipei	Denmark	Czech Republic
2002	Portugal	South Korea	Hong Kong
2003	Kenya	Sri Lanka	(Cooperation Council for the Arab States of the Gulf) Arabian Gulf
2004	Japan	Sri Lanka	Kazakhstan
2005	Japan	Sri Lanka	(Cooperation Council for the Arab States of the Gulf) Arabian Gulf
2006	South Korea	Thailand	Malaysia
2007	Hong Kong	China	India
2008	Malaysia	Chinese Taipei	Singapore

=== Asian Games ===
Year	Round	Position	Pld	W	D	L
(Thailand) 1998	Bronze Medal Final	4th	5	2	0	3
(South Korea) 2002	Final	2nd place, silver medalist(s)	5	4	0	1
(Qatar) 2006	Bronze Medal Final	4th	4	1	0	3
(China) 2010	N/A					
(South Korea) 2014	Classification 7th–8th	8th	6	1	0	5
(Indonesia) 2018	Classification 7th–8th	7th	6	2	0	4
(China) 2022	Classification 7th–8th	8th	5	1	0	4
(Japan) 2026	To be determined					
Total	0 Titles	6/7	31	11	0	20
