= South Korea national rugby sevens team =

South Korea
- Union: Korea Rugby Union
- Coach: Charles Louw
- Captain: Wanyong Park
Team kit

World Cup Sevens
- Appearances: 5 (First in 1993)
- Best result: 5th (1997)

The South Korea national rugby sevens team is a minor national sevens side. They sometimes take part in the Rugby World Cup Sevens, and have competed in the Hong Kong Sevens since the 1980s.

South Korea made their Olympic debut at the 2020 Tokyo Olympics, they had qualified the previous year after defeating Hong Kong at the 2019 Asia Rugby Sevens Olympic Qualifying Tournament in Incheon.

== Tournament history ==
=== Summer Olympics ===
Olympic Games record
Year	Round	Position	Pld	W	L	D
(Brazil) 2016	Did not qualify					
(Japan) 2020	9–12th Place Playoff	12th	5	0	5	0
(France) 2024	Did not qualify					
Total	0 Titles	1/3	5	0	5	0

=== Rugby World Cup Sevens ===
World Cup record
Year	Round	Position	Pld	W	L	D
(Scotland) 1993	Group stage	11th	6	3	3	0
(Hong Kong) 1997	Cup Quarter-finals	5th	5	1	3	1
(Argentina) 2001	Plate Quarter-finals	13th	6	2	3	1
(Hong Kong) 2005	Bowl Quarter-finals	21st	6	1	5	0
(United Arab Emirates) 2009	Did not qualify					
(Russia) 2013	Did not qualify					
(United States) 2018	Did not qualify					
(South Africa) 2022	Bowl Quarter-finals	21st	4	2	2	0
Total	0 Titles	5/8	27	9	16	2

=== Asian Games ===
Asian Games record
Year	Round	Position	Pld	W	L	D
(Thailand) 1998	Winners	1st	5	5	0	0
(South Korea) 2002	Winners	1st	5	5	0	0
(Qatar) 2006	Runner-up	2nd	4	3	1	0
(China) 2010	Semi-finalist	3rd	6	4	2	0
(South Korea) 2014	Semi-finalist	3rd	6	5	1	0
(Indonesia) 2018	Semi-finalist	3rd	6	5	1	0
Total	2 Titles	6/6	32	27	5	0

=== Hong Kong Sevens results ===
Year	Venue	Cup			Plate	
Year	Venue	Winner	Final score	Runner-up	Winner	Runner-up
1982; Details	Government Stadium	Australia	18-14	Scottish Border Club	South Korea	Japan
1983; Details	Government Stadium	Australia	14-4	Fiji	South Korea	Canada
1991; Details	Government Stadium	Fiji	18-14	New Zealand	Argentina	South Korea
1994; Details	Hong Kong Stadium	New Zealand	32-20	Australia	South Korea	Hong Kong
1998; Details	Hong Kong Stadium	Fiji	28-19	Western Samoa	South Korea	Morocco

=== Sri Lanka Sevens ===
Year	Cup	Plate	Bowl
1999	South Korea	Malaysia	India
2000	Chinese Taipei	Japan	Thailand
2001	Chinese Taipei	Denmark	Czech Republic
2002	Portugal	South Korea	Hong Kong
2003	Kenya	Sri Lanka	Arabian Gulf
2004	Japan	Sri Lanka	Kazakhstan
2005	Japan	Sri Lanka	Arabian Gulf
2006	South Korea	Thailand	Malaysia
2007	Hong Kong	China	India
2008	Malaysia	Chinese Taipei	Singapore
