= Arabian Gulf rugby union team =

Former rugby team

- Union: Persian gulf Rugby Football Union
- Nickname: the Gulf
- Coach: Darryl Weir
- Captain(s): Mark Gathercole, Nigel Palmer, David Clark
Team kit

First match
- Arabian Gulf 20–64 Namibia; 3 July 1993; Last international Arabian Gulf 21–19 South Korea; 14 May 2010

Largest win
- Arabian Gulf 97–3 India; 27 April 2001

Largest defeat
- Japan 114–6 Arabian Gulf; 3 May 2008

The Arabian Gulf rugby union team was a combined team of players that represented the countries of the Gulf Cooperation Council in international rugby union competitions. The team competed in international matches between 1993 and 2010, and was governed by the Arabian Gulf Rugby Football Union (AGRFU). Associate members were Egypt, Lebanon and Jordan.

The Arabian Gulf participated in the 1999 RWC qualifiers, where they beat, Botswana, Zambia and Tunisia to qualify for the next round of competition, losing somewhat controversially to the Kenyan National team in Nairobi. In 2002 The Gulf team played in a tournament in Colombo versus the Sri Lankan national team as well as Japan, comfortably beating the Lankan team but struggled against the growing power of the Japanese team, which went on to beat many top tier nations. In 2003 The Gulf team played in the Asian Championships in Bangkok Thailand, where they beat Malaysia and Singapore but lost narrowly to the Thai national team in the Final. The following year, now under the spiritual guidance of Captain Nigel Palmer, they played in the Cobra 10s tournament in Kuala Lumpur beating HK, Singapore and Malaysia but lost by 3 points to South Africa in the Final. The highest tier of the inaugural 2008 Asian Five Nations alongside Korea, Japan, Hong Kong and Kazakhstan. After losing all four of their matches and subsequently finishing last, the team was relegated to Division One for the 2009 tournament. The team proceeded to win Division One in 2009, securing promotion to the Asian Five Nations for 2010.

In 2007 Palmer and his henchmen, William Wood and Paul Manders formed the AGRFU Veterans team, the “Gulf Legends” which they set up to make space to allow aging Gulf vets to continue entertaining their fan base. Each year since then “The Leg’Ends” (as they are globally known) have played in the Dubai rugby 7s tournament and their annual Easter tours, winning hearts and minds and contributing to the local economies.

However, on 16 January 2009, the sport's international governing body, the International Rugby Board (IRB), announced that the AGRFU – and the combined Arabian Gulf team – would be split into separate national entities and cease to exist by the end of 2010. The first new union to be formed was that of the UAE, which became a full IRB member in November 2012.

The team's final tournament before the breakup was the 2010 Asian Five Nations, which doubled as the final stage of Asian qualification for the 2011 Rugby World Cup. The Arabian Gulf team won two of their four matches, including a 21–19 win in their final match in history at The Sevens in Dubai against Korea.

== World Cup record ==
- 1987 - Not invited
- 1991 - Did not qualify
- 1995 - Did not qualify
- 1999 - Did not qualify
- 2003 - Did not qualify
- 2007 - Did not qualify (See 2007 Rugby World Cup – Asia qualification)
- 2011 - Did not qualify (See 2011 Rugby World Cup – Asia qualification)

The team did not take part in the 2015 tournament qualifying as it had been broken up by then.

== Women's rugby ==
Although Arabian Gulf's women never played test match rugby, they were at the time one of the most active international sevens rugby teams, taking part in the first ever women's tournament in 1997, playing over 70 internationals between 1997 and 2010.

== Successor teams ==
Former associate members of the AGRFU, Jordan and Lebanon played each other on 14 May 2010, the first match for both national teams.

The UAE Rugby Federation, and the respective federations of Lebanon, Jordan, Qatar and Saudi Arabia, all subsequently joined Asia Rugby in their own right.

== See also ==
- Rugby union in the Arabian Peninsula
- Arabian Gulf Cup
- GCC Futsal Cup
- GCC Games
- Gulf Cooperation Council Athletics Championships
- Gulf Cooperation Council Youth Athletics Championships
