= India national rugby sevens team =

India national rugby sevens team may refer to:

- India men's national rugby sevens team
- India women's national rugby sevens team
