= Khelo India =

Indian sports programme

Khelo India official logo

Khelo India: National Programme for Development of Sports, branded as Khelo India (transl. Play India), aims at improving India's sports culture at the grass-root level through organized talent identification, structured sporting competitions and infrastructure development. It is a Government of India programme launched in 2017-18 under the tenure Prime Minister Narendra Modi and Sports Ministers Vijay Goel and Rajyavardhan Singh Rathore. There has also been an emphasis on including traditional Indian games in Khelo India events in order to revive their popularity.

== Competitions ==
- Khelo India Youth Games
  - Editions: 2018, 2019, 2020, 2021, 2022, 2023, 2024, 2025
- Khelo India University Games
  - Editions: 2020, 2022, 2023, 2024, 2025
- Khelo India Winter Games
  - Editions: 2020, 2021, 2023, 2024, 2025, 2026
- Khelo India Para Games
  - Editions: 2023, 2025
- Khelo India Beach Games
  - Editions: 2025, 2026
- Khelo India Water Sports Festival
  - Editions: 2025
- Khelo India Tribal Games
  - Editions: 2026

== Khelo India Centres of Excellence ==
Khelo India State Centres of Excellence (KISCE) are sports facilities across India, built upon existing facilities, aiming to provide basic facilities for sportspersons with potential. Each centre will cater to three sporting disciplines. In 36 States and Union Territories across 679 districts, there are more than 1000 Khelo India centres and in 31 States and Union Territories, around 32 Khelo India State Centres of Excellence have been notified.

In November 2020, Minerva Academy was accredited as one of the centres of KISCE.

Anurag Thakur has officially launched 33 Khelo India centers at Sawai Mansingh Stadium in Rajasthan. Additionally, the Sports Minister revealed plans to establish a National Center of Excellence featuring a specialized Sports Science Center in Rajasthan. Furthermore, an extra 18 Khelo India Centers will be established, bringing the total count of such centers in the state to 51.

== See also ==
- Sports in India
- National Games of India
- Target Olympic Podium Scheme
- Fit India Movement
