= Sports in Bihar =

Sports in the Indian state of Bihar

Sports in Bihar are administered by state bodies, associations, and local organisations. In recent years, the Government of Bihar has expanded infrastructure and training programmes to support athlete development and sporting activities.

== Governing bodies ==
The main governing organisation is the Bihar State Sports Authority (BSSA), established in 2023 under the Government of Bihar. It manages sports infrastructure, training programmes, and athlete welfare. BSSA conducts the Bihar Khel Pratibha Khoj talent hunt across schools and prepares athletes for future international events.

Bihar Cricket Association (BCA) – Governing body for cricket in Bihar, affiliated to the Board of Control for Cricket in India (BCCI).

Other State Associations – Football, Athletics, Hockey, Volleyball, Rugby, Kabaddi and Karate are managed by their respective state federations affiliated to national bodies.

== Infrastructure ==
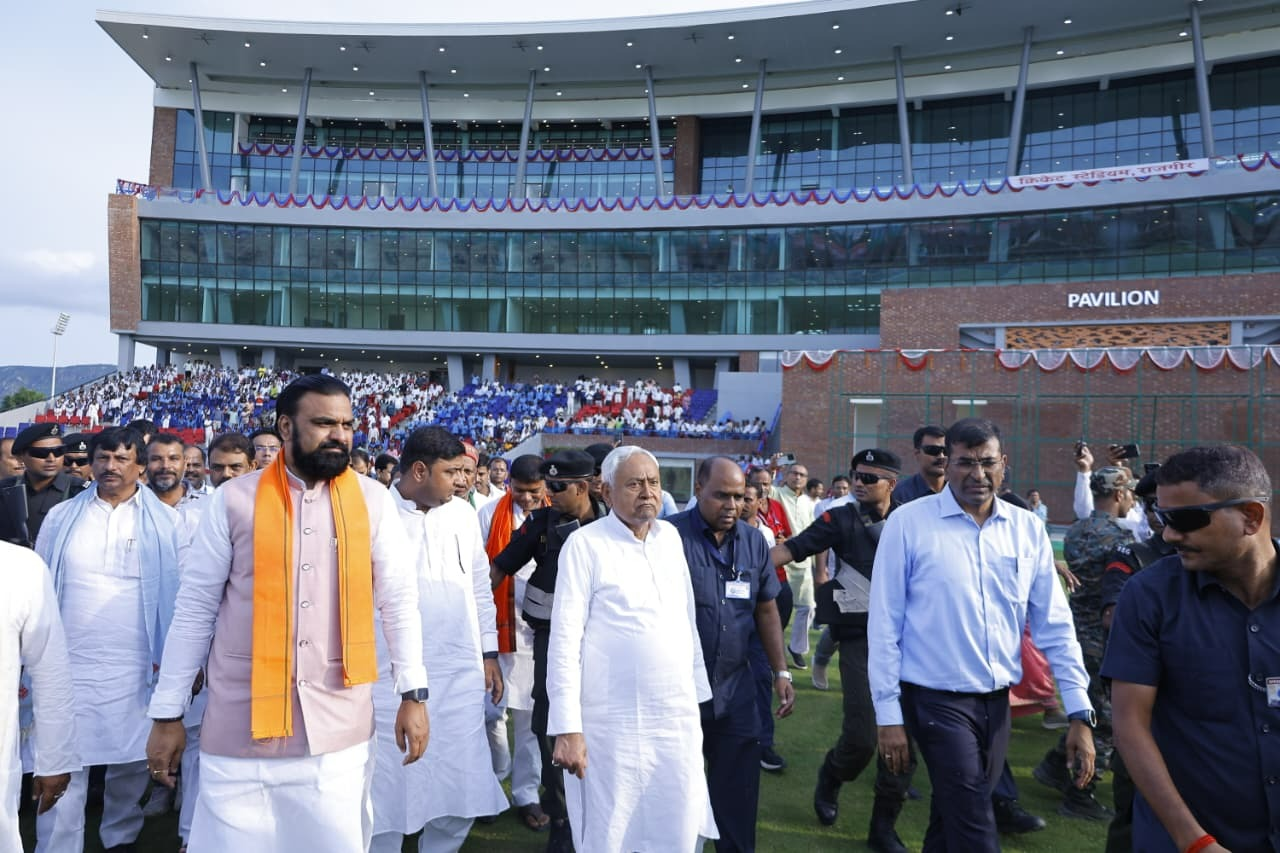
Deputy Chief Minister Samrat Choudhary and CM Nitish Kumar inaugurating Rajgir cricket stadium in Nalanda district of Bihar.

- Patliputra Sports Complex (Patna) – Major multi-sport venue with a 20,000-seat outdoor stadium and a 3,500-seat indoor arena. It hosted the 2012 Women’s World Cup Kabaddi and Pro Kabaddi League matches.
- Rajgir Sports Complex – Inaugurated in 2024, spread over 90 acres with a cricket stadium, sports university, hospital, and training centres.
- Moin-ul-Haq Stadium (Patna) – Being redeveloped into a 40,000+ capacity cricket stadium with international facilities.
- Over 8,000 village playgrounds and more than 250 block-level stadiums are being developed to strengthen grassroots sports.

== Major sports ==
Cricket is the most popular sport, with the Bihar cricket team competing in Indian domestic tournaments. Athletics, archery, kabaddi and martial arts (especially karate) have strong grassroots participation. Hockey, football, swimming, and rugby are also gaining prominence.

== Major events hosted ==
- 2025 Khelo India Youth Games, held across Patna, Rajgir, Gaya, Bhagalpur and Begusarai, featured 8,500 athletes in 28 sports.
- 2025 Men's Hockey Asia Cup was hosted at Rajgir Sports Complex, marking the first time Bihar staged an international hockey tournament.
- Bihar also hosted its first Asia-level rugby event in Rajgir.

== Notable athletes ==
- Vaibhav Sooryavanshi, youngest-ever player in the Indian Premier League.
- Shreyasi Singh, Commonwealth Games gold medallist shooter, advocates for greater women’s participation in sports.
- Md Zabir Ansari, Karate player.
- Preyansh, Karate player.
- Pramod Bhagat , Paralympic gold medalist and para-badminton player
- Kavita Roy,Former Indian women's ODI cricketer

== See also ==
- Bihar State Sports Authority
- Patliputra Sports Complex
- Moin-ul-Haq Stadium
- 2025 Khelo India Youth Games
