= 2025 Asia Rugby Emirates U20s Sevens =

Rugby sevens tournament

- Hosts: India (host nation); Hong Kong; China; Kazakhstan; Malaysia; Nepal; Sri Lanka; United Arab Emirates; Uzbekistan
- Date: 9–10 August 2025
- Nations: 9

The 2025 Asia Rugby Emirates U20s Sevens was the thirteenth edition of the Asia Rugby Sevens Series. It will feature national youth teams from across the continent, including China, Hong Kong, India, Kazakhstan, Sri Lanka, the United Arab Emirates, and Uzbekistan, all sending both men’s and women’s teams. Malaysia will compete in the men’s competition only, while Nepal will be represented in the women’s tournament. It is hosted by Rugby Football Association of Bihar, India and is being played in the campus of Bihar Sports University of Rajgir, Nalanda district, Bihar.

== Teams ==
The 2025 Asia Rugby Emirates U20s Sevens featured 9 nations with 16 teams (8 men's and 8 women's teams).

The participating countries were:

- India (Host)
- China
- Hong Kong
- Kazakhstan
- Malaysia (men's competition only)
- Nepal (women's competition only)
- Sri Lanka
- United Arab Emirates
- Uzbekistan

== See also ==
- 2024 Asia Rugby Sevens Series
- Asia Rugby Sevens Series
- Asia Rugby
- Rugby union in Asia
- Bihar Olympic Association
- Bihar Football Association
- India national rugby union team
- India women's national rugby union team
- India national rugby sevens team
