= Chandigarh Group of Colleges =

College in Punjab, India

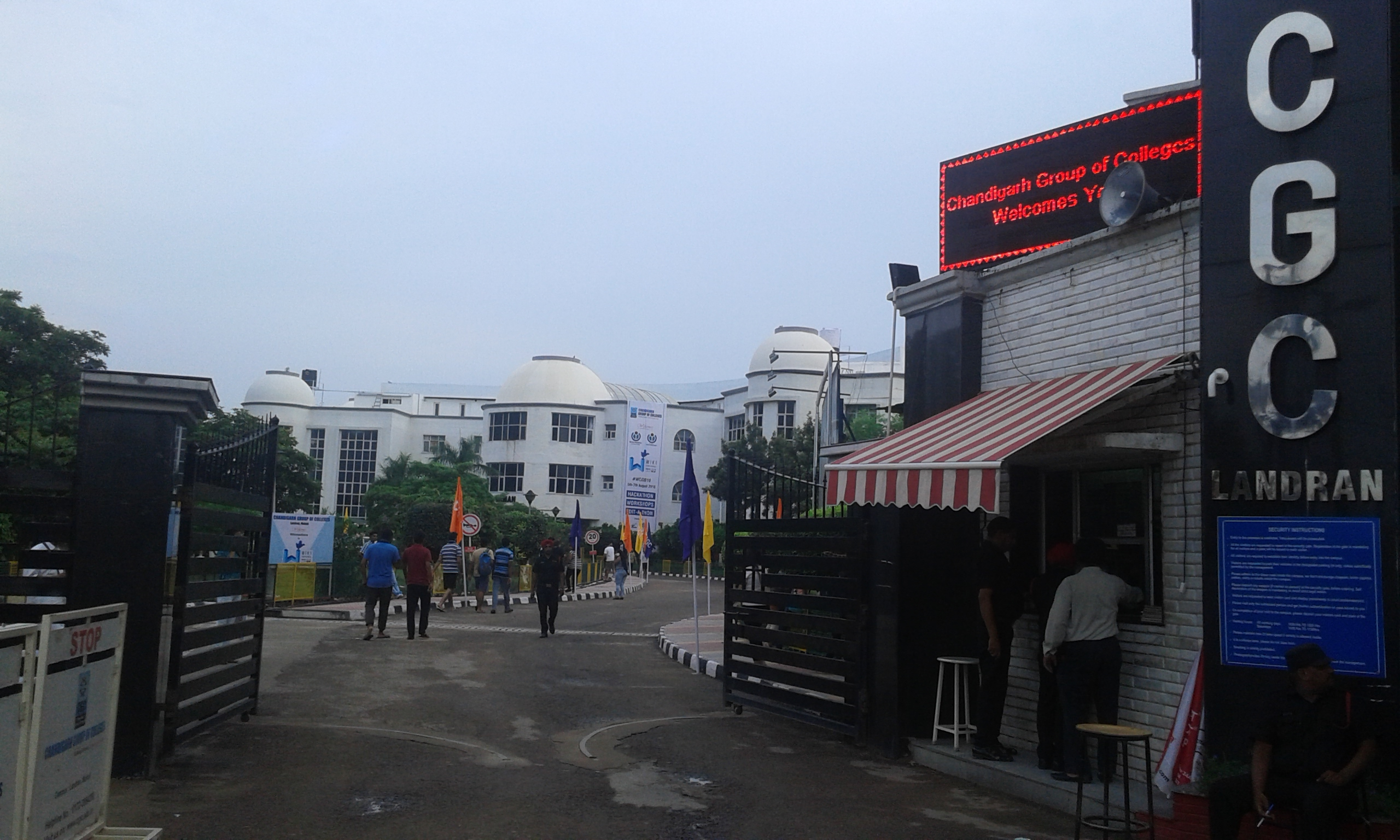
- Main gate of Chandigarh Group of Colleges
- Type: College
- Established: 2001
- Academic affiliations: I. K. Gujral Punjab Technical University
- Chairman: Satnam Singh Sandhu
- Location: Landran and Jhanjheri in Mohali district, Punjab, India; 30°41′11″N 76°39′53″E
- Campus: Rural (Village)
- Website: www.cgc.edu.in

The Chandigarh Group of Colleges (or CGC) are the educational institutions located in the Mohali district of Punjab, near Mohali. The CGC was established in 2001 at Landran and in 2012 at Jhanjeri.

== Individual institutions ==
CGC Landran, CGC University Mohali, and Chandigarh University are part of the CGC. They are distinct institutions at different locations.

=== CGC Landran ===
CGC Landran, also known as Landran College, was created in 2001 under affiliation with I. K. Gujral Punjab Technical University. CGC Landran offers technical, pharmaceutical, management, arts, and science courses. Landran is an urbanized village with links to Sohana, Kharar, and Banur, three towns and villages in Mohali.

==== Campus activities and sports ====
CGC campus students have the opportunity to be a part of different cultural events like fashion shows, faculty felicitation, the NASA-sponsored CanSat competition, MHRD's Smart India Hackathon events, Start up to Scale Up conferences, NCC best cadet, Faculty Development Programmes apart from annual Techno cultural Fests. CGC students also participate in many sports tournaments and competitions such as Volleyball, Wrestling, weightlifting, power lifting, and best physique championships.

=== CGC University Mohali ===
In 2012, CGC Jhanjeri, now CGC University Mohali, was initiated as a technical campus. It currently runs under administration in Jhanjeri, a village between Mohali and Sirhind-Fategarh.

=== CGC Gharuan or Chandigarh University ===
CGC Gharaun was initiated in 2009. The University Grants Commission gave it university status in 2012. It is now known as Chandigarh University.

== Placements ==
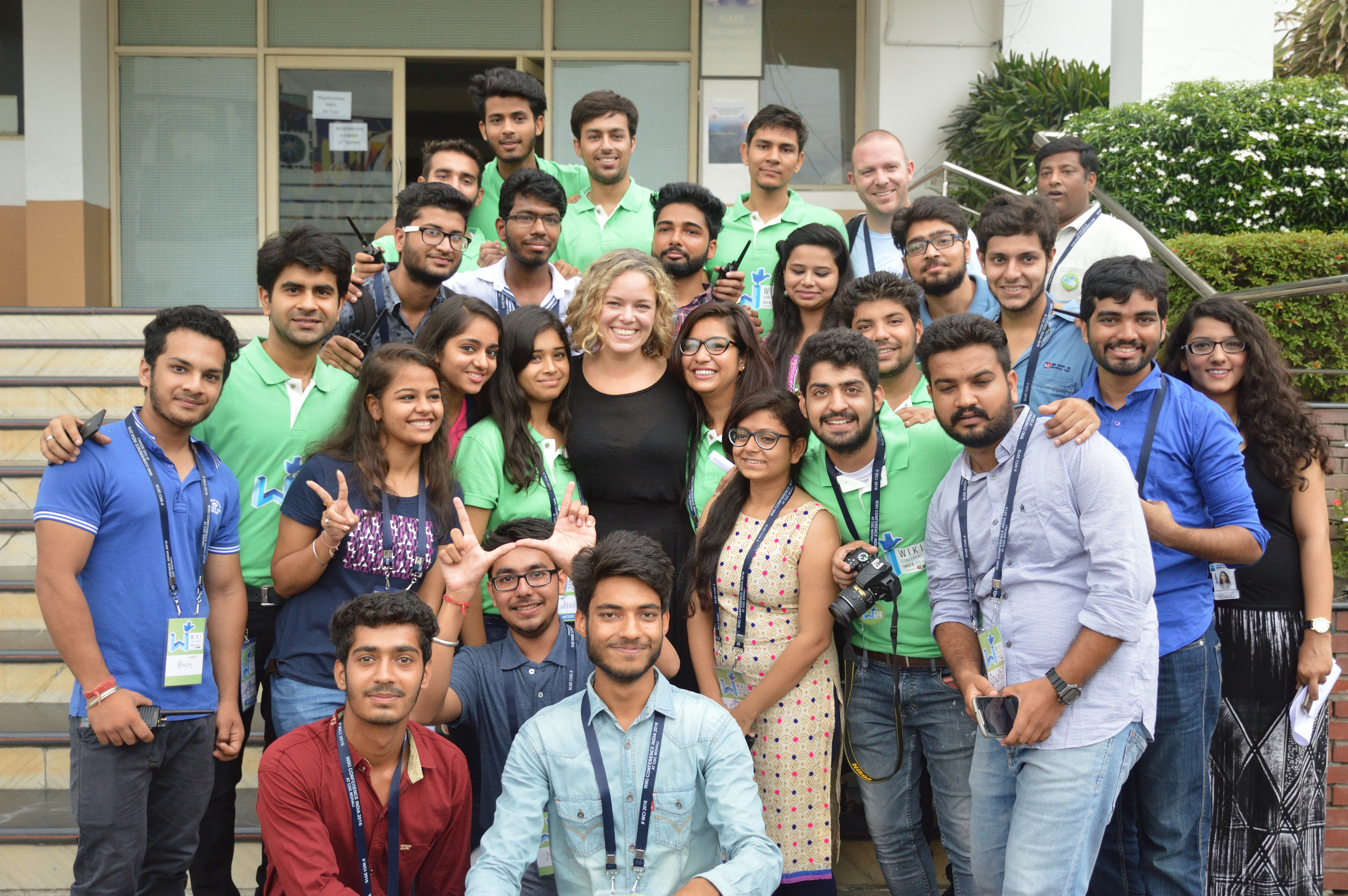
CGC students with a foreign guest

In 2017, 457 multinational corporations, including Amazon, Microsoft, and HP, visited CGC Landran with 4900 placement offers. HP, Wipro, Cognizant, and IBM visited CGC University Mohali with more than 27 job offers. In 2018, the university was recognised as the best institution for placements in Punjab by Amarinder Singh, the Chief Minister of Punjab.

== Research and development ==
CGC Landran is placed within the top ten Indian institutes by patents filed. CGC Landran has a memorandum of understanding with the National Institute of Electronics & Information Technology for entrepreneurship, research and development projects, and training. The institute is a member of the artificial intelligence and deep learning project under the Newton Bhabha Fund, sanctioned by the UK's Royal Academy of Engineering. The college was granted ₹23 lakh (US$24,000) by the Indian Council of Medical Research for the development of a nanotechnology-based lung cancer vaccine.

== Ranking ==
CGC Landran was awarded the Aspiring Minds' National Employability Award in 2019 and placed within the top 50 engineering institutes according to a Times engineering survey. It was given an A++ rank in the Chronicle India's engineering college survey.

== See also ==
- Chandigarh University
- Thapar Institute of Engineering and Technology
- Indian School of Business
