= Dhanalakshmi Poojary =

Indian kabaddi player

Dhanalakshmi Poojary (born 2004) is an Indian kabaddi player from Karnataka. She plays for the Indian women's national kabaddi team and for Karnataka in the domestic tournaments. She is an allrounder.

== Early life ==
Poojary is from the Suratkal Idya locality in Mangaluru city, Dakshina Kannada district, Karnataka. Her parents are Narayan Poojary and Shashikala. He did her graduation and post-graduation at Alva's College, Moodabidiri, which is part of Alva's Education Foundation and was a product of Alva's Sports Club programme.

== Career ==
She was a part of the Indian women's national kabaddi team that won gold in the Women's Kabaddi World Cup 2025 at Dhaka, Bangladesh in November 2025. Before the World Cup, she trained at Sports Authority of India (SAI) Centre in Gandhinagar, Gujarat after she was selected for the national camp. She captained the Karnataka state team in the 2025 Senior Federation Cup Kabaddi Championship. She also represented Karnataka 12 time in various junior, senior and Khelo India games. She also represented Mangalore University at the All India Inter-University Games.
