= Valasamgari Bhavani =

Indian track and field Para Athlete

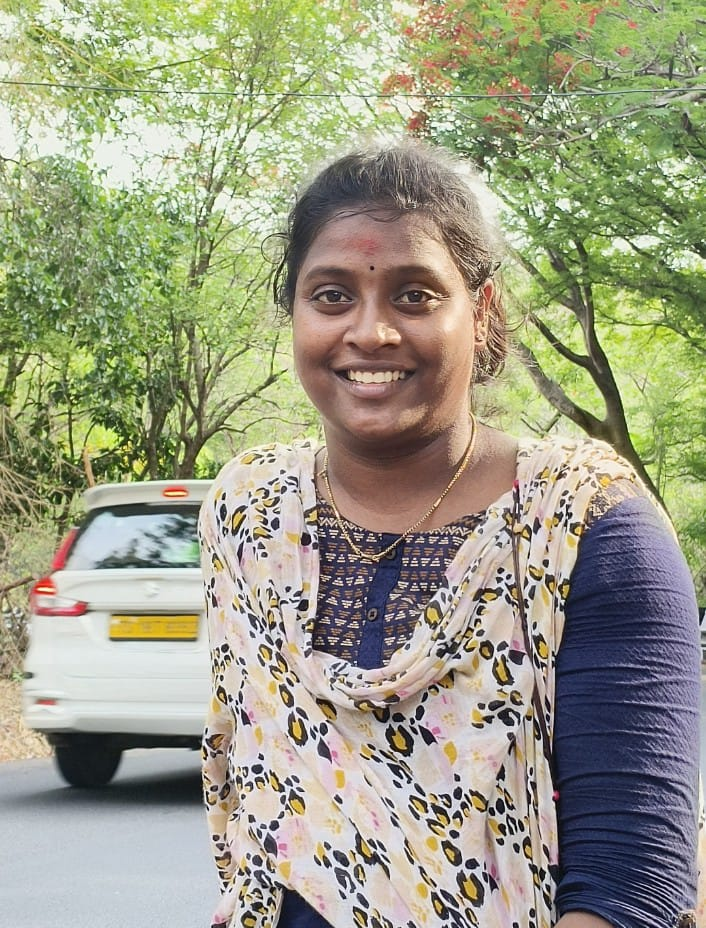

Personal information
- Nationality: Indian
- Education: Graduate

Sport
- Country: India
- Sport: Track & Field
- Disability: Right Upper Limb - Post Traumatic Amputation
- Disability class: T-46
- Events: 100m, 200m, Long jump, Shot Put
- Coached by: Zaseem
Medal record
Representing India
Women's athletics
New Delhi 2026 World Para Athletics Grand Prix
Bronze medal – third place	New Delhi	100m
Gold medal – first place	New Delhi	200m
World Para Athletics Grand Prix 2026
Bronze medal – third place	Dubai	100m
Silver medal – second place	Dubai	200m
World Para Athletics Grand Prix 2025
Gold medal – first place	Olomouc, Czech Republic	100m
Gold medal – first place	Olomouc, Czech Republic	200m
World Abilitysport Games 2023
Bronze medal – third place	Nakhon Ratchasima, Thailand	100m
Bronze medal – third place	Nakhon Ratchasima, Thailand	Shot Put
Khelo India Para Games 2025
Silver medal – second place	Delhi	100m
Bronze medal – third place	Delhi	Long Jump
Khelo India Para Games 2023
Bronze medal – third place	Delhi	100m
Silver medal – second place	Delhi	200m
Bronze medal – third place	Delhi	Long Jump

Valasamgari Bhavani is an Indian track and field Para Athlete from Andhra Pradesh. Bhavani was born in SPSR Nellore District. She represents India in the Women's 100m, 200m, long jump and shot put events.

== Childhood and early life ==
Valasamgari Bhavani was born in a poor family in Muttukur village of SPSR Nellore district, Andhra Pradesh. Her father, Chandraiah died in 2009 and her mother, Bujjamma is a housewife. In her childhood days, she played Kho Kho and Kabaddi and dreamt of becoming a sprinter as it is supported by her father. In 2009, climbing on a water tanker truck she accidentally touched a live electric cable, in which her right arm incurred significant damage and also her father who tried to protect her from electric shock was died on spot. She received medical attention but the doctors amputated her right arm. After that with the support of her mother and her coach, Zaseem, SAAP coach started her athletic training.

== Career ==
In her initial days of training, it took over twenty seconds to finish 100m race. She trained under Coach Sk. Zaseem, to improve skills in sprinting as she is still training only in the Sports Authority of Andhra Pradesh. Bhavani won her first national medal in 19th Indian national para athletics, 2021 at Bengaluru and her first Indian ranking medal in 4th Indian Open National Para-Athletics Championships. She won bronze medals in both 100m sprint and shot put under T-46 category at 2023 World Abilitysport Games, Nakhon Ratchasima, Thailand. Later, on the encouragement of G. Venkateshwara Rao, President and V. Ramaswamy, General Secretary to the AP Para Sports Association she achieved several in Para Athletic events.

A knee injury prevented her from participating in Para Athletics for a few months, but she later recovered. Later, she switched to a synthetic race track in Acharya Nagarjuna University, Guntur for improved athletic training. After two years of training in ANU, Guntur, she returned to AC Subbareddy Stadium, Nellore.

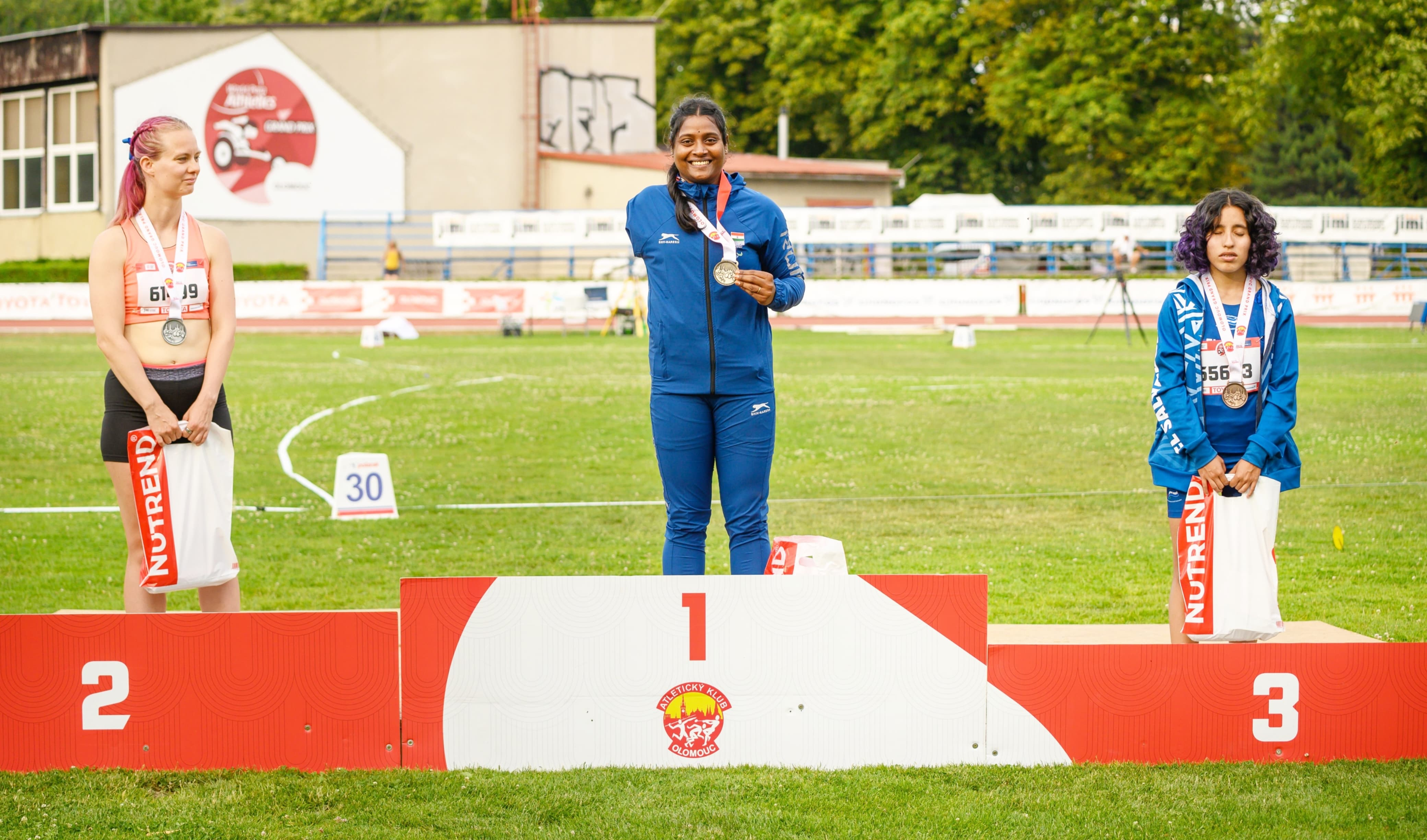
Bhavani won the gold medal in the World Para Athletics Grandprix, 2025

In the World Para Athletics Grand Prix 2025 she won the Gold Medal in both the 100m and 200m events.

In the year 2026, she got Silver Medal and Bronze Medal in the events, 200m run and 100m run respectively in World Para Athletics Grand Prix 2026, Dubai and got Gold Medal in 200m and Bronze Medal in the 100m New Delhi 2026 World Para Athletics Grand Prix.

== Achievements ==
=== 8th Indian Open Para Athletics International Championships - 2026 ===
Year	Venue	Event	Category	Result
2026	Bengaluru	100m	T46	Gold
2026	Bengaluru	200m	T46	Bronze

=== New Delhi 2026 World Para Athletics Grand Prix ===
Year	Venue	Event	Category	Result
2026	New Delhi	100m	T46	Bronze
2026	New Delhi	200m	T46	Gold

=== World Para Athletics Grand Prix, Dubai ===
Year	Venue	Event	Category	Result
2026	Dubai	100m	T46	Bronze
2026	Dubai	200m	T46	Silver

=== World Para Athletics Grand Prix, Czech Republic ===
Year	Venue	Event	Category	Result
2025	Olomouc, Czech Republic	100m	T46	Gold
2025	Olomouc, Czech Republic	200m	T46	Gold

=== 7th Indian Open Para - Athletics International Championship ===
Year	Venue	Event	Category	Result
2025	Bengaluru	100m	T46	Silver
2025	Bengaluru	200m	T46	Silver

=== 6th Indian Open Para Athletics International Championships ===
Year	Venue	Event	Category	Result
2024	Bengaluru	100m	T35/44/46/47/62	Bronze
2024	Bengaluru	long Jump	T20/44/46	Bronze

=== World Abilitysport Games ===
Year	Venue	Event	Category	Result
2023	Nakhon Ratchasima, Thailand	100m	T42/46/62	Bronze
2023	Nakhon Ratchasima, Thailand	shot put	F46	Bronze

=== Khelo India Para Games ===
Year	Venue	Event	Category	Result
2025	Delhi	100m	T45/46/47	Silver
2025	Delhi	Long Jump	T45/46/47	Bronze
2023	Delhi	100m	T45/46/47	Bronze
2023	Delhi	200m	T45/46/47	Silver
2023	Delhi	Long Jump	T45/46/47	Bronze

=== 5th Indian Open Para Athletics International Championship ===
Year	Venue	Event	Category	Result
2023	Bengaluru	100m	T46	Silver

=== 4th Indian Open National Para-Athletics Championships ===
Year	Venue	Event	Category	Result
2022	Bengaluru	200m	T11/12/35/46/47	Bronze

=== National Para Athletic Championships ===
Year	Venue	Event	Category	Result
2026	Bhubaneswar	100m	T45/46/47	Bronze
2025	Chennai	100m	T45/46/47	Bronze
2025	Chennai	Long Jump	T45/46/47	Bronze
2024	Goa	100m	T45/46/47	Silver
2024	Goa	Long Jump	T45/46/47	Silver
2023	Pune	100m	T45/46/47	Silver
2023	Pune	200m	T45/46/47	Bronze
2021	Bengaluru	100m	T46	Silver
2021	Bengaluru	200m	T46	Bronze
2021	Bengaluru	Shot Put	T46	Silver
