= Trupti Mane =

Indian weightlifter

Trupti Mane is an Indian weightlifter who won gold in the 2017 Commonwealth Youth Champion in the 58kg category. She hails from Kolhapur. She also bagged 2 gold medals for Maharashtra in the Khelo India Youth Games in 2018.
