= Satnam Singh Sandhu =

Indian parliament member (born 1969)

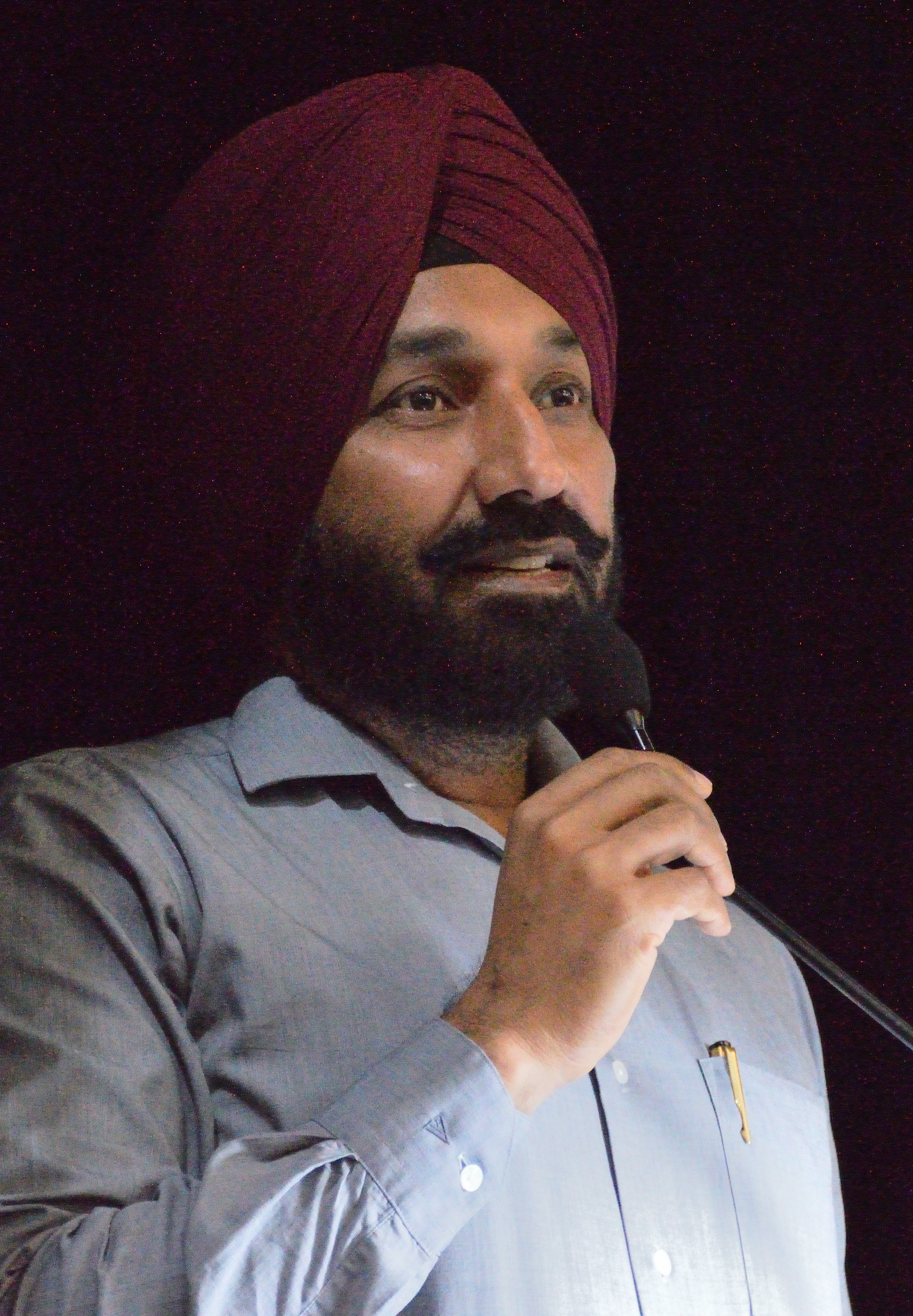
- Satnam Singh Sandhu in 2016

Member of Parliament, Rajya Sabha
- Incumbent
- Assumed office 30 January 2024
- Appointed by: Droupadi Murmu (President of India)
- Constituency: Nominated (Education)

Personal details
- Born: 11 September 1969 (age 56) Rasoolpur, Ferozepur, Punjab, India
- Citizenship: India
- Party: Bhartiya Janata Party BJP
- Spouse: Damandeep Kaur Sandhu
- Children: 2 sons
- Website: satnamsandhu.in

Satnam Singh Sandhu is a Chancellor of Chandigarh University and a nominated Member of Parliament, Rajya Sabha.

Sandhu founded the Chandigarh Group of Colleges (CGC) at Landran in Mohali in 2001, Chandigarh University in 2012 and Chandigarh University, Unnao in 2024. Sandhu is also involved in community services in health and wellness sectors and runs two NGOs, the Indian Minorities Foundation and the New India Development Foundation.

== Political life ==
Satnam Singh Sandhu is a Member of Parliament in the Rajya Sabha.

== Digital initiatives ==
In January 2026, Satnam Singh Sandhu launched an Artificial intelligence (AI)-enabled web portal designed to facilitate citizen engagement by collecting public opinions, suggestions, and grievances. The platform uses AI tools to categorise issues from urban and rural areas into sectors such as health, infrastructure, education, and women’s safety, and includes multilingual support and an “MP Performance Dashboard” that allows citizens to track parliamentary activities such as questions asked and debates participated in.
