= Khelo India University Games =

National multi-sport event held in India

- Abbreviation: KIUG
- Purpose: Multi-sport events across Indian universities
- Frequency: Annual
- Inaugurated: 2020
- Headquarters: New Delhi, India
- Website: Khelo India University Games

Khelo India University Games (KIUG) is a national level multi-sport event held in India, where athletes from universities across the country compete in different sports disciplines. The inaugural edition held in Odisha started on 22 February and concluded on 1 March 2020. It is organised by Sports Authority of India (SAI) and Ministry of Youth Affairs and Sports along with Association of Indian Universities, Indian Olympic Association and National Sports Federation. It is the largest university level sports competition in India.

Khelo India University Games was launched after the success of the Khelo India Youth Games, which had completed its third edition in 2020. The Khelo India University Games is intended to identify and train capable athletes in the age group of 18 to 25 years for the Olympics and the Asian Games.

== History ==
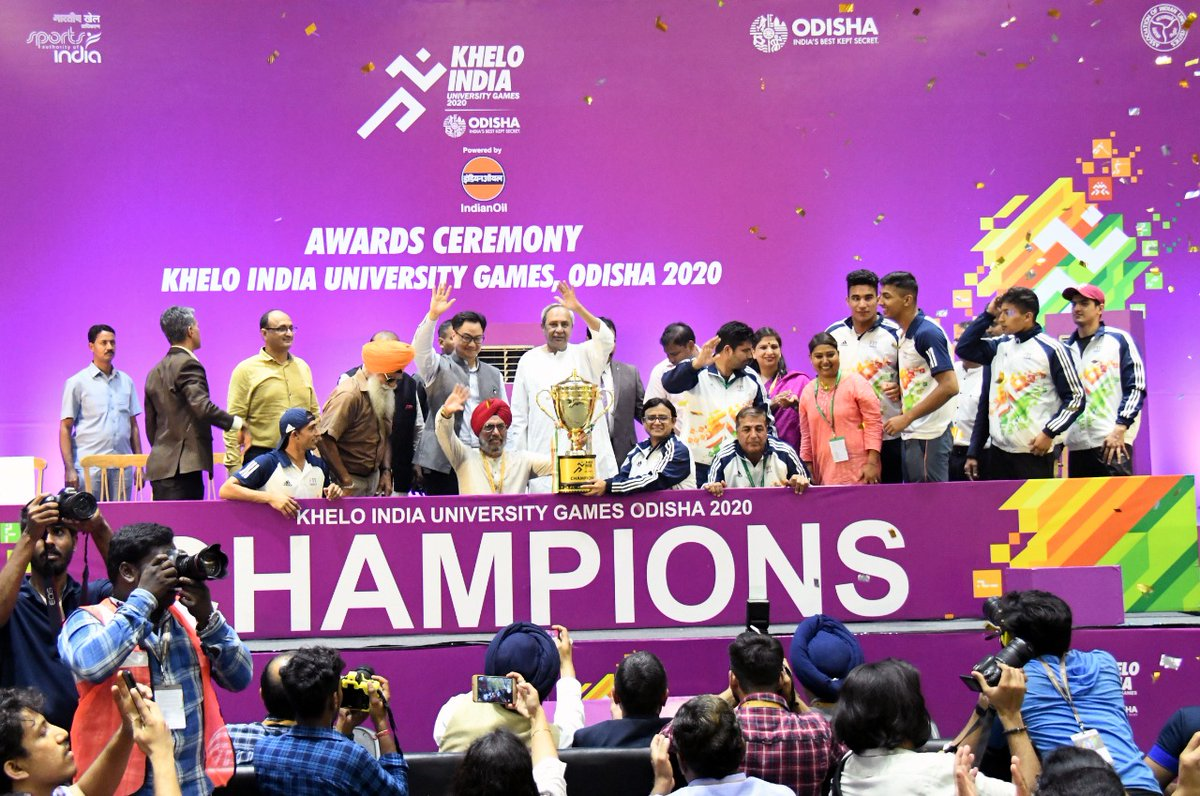
The winners of the first edition with Chief Minister Naveen Patnaik and Kiren Rijiju

On 22 February 2020, Prime Minister Narendra Modi, inaugurated the first edition of the Khelo India University Games in Cuttack. The inaugural event was held at JNL Indoor Stadium. Coaches and officials believe that the event gives athletes the exposure of multi-disciplinary events and promote sporting talent at the university level.

== Editions ==
Khelo India University Games
Edition	Year	Host(s)	Start Date	End Date	Sports	Gold	1st Team				2nd Team				3rd Team				Ref
Edition	Year	Host(s)	Start Date	End Date	Sports	Gold	Gold Medal	Silver Medal	Bronze Medal	T	Gold Medal	Silver Medal	Bronze Medal	T	Gold Medal	Silver Medal	Bronze Medal	T	Ref
I	2020	Kalinga Institute of Industrial Technology, Odisha	22 February	1 March	17	206	Panjab University, Chandigarh				Savitribai Phule Pune University, Maharashtra				Punjabi University, Punjab				
I	2020	Kalinga Institute of Industrial Technology, Odisha	22 February	1 March	17	206	17	19	10	46	17	11	9	37	13	6	14	33	
II	2022	Jain University, Karnataka	24 April	3 May	20	259	Jain University, Karnataka				Lovely Professional University, Punjab				Panjab University, Chandigarh				
II	2022	Jain University, Karnataka	24 April	3 May	20	259	20	7	5	32	17	15	19	51	15	19	24	48	
III	2023	IIT Kanpur & Banaras Hindu University, Uttar Pradesh	23 May	3 June	21	262	Panjab University, Chandigarh				Guru Nanak Dev University, Punjab				Jain University, Karnataka				
III	2023	IIT Kanpur & Banaras Hindu University, Uttar Pradesh	23 May	3 June	21	262	26	17	26	69	24	27	17	68	16	10	6	32	
IV	2024	Assam	17 February	29 February	20	240	Chandigarh University, Punjab				Lovely Professional University, Punjab				Guru Nanak Dev University, Punjab				
IV	2024	Assam	17 February	29 February	20	240	32	18	21	71	20	14	8	42	12	20	19	51	
V	2025	Rajasthan	24 November	5 December	23		Chandigarh University, Punjab				Lovely Professional University, Punjab				Guru Nanak Dev University, Punjab				
V	2025	Rajasthan	24 November	5 December	23		42	14	11	67	32	24	22	78	32	22	17	72	

== 2020 edition ==
The 2020 edition was held from 22 February to 1 March 2020 includes 211 events in 17 sports. The sport events were held at Kalinga Institute of Industrial Technology (KIIT) in Bhubaneswar, JNL Indoor Stadium, SAI-Odisha Badminton Academy and SAI International Residential School in Cuttack.

More than 4000 athletes from 176 universities participated in the events. The number of medals include 206 Gold, 206 Silver and 286 Bronze. Fencing and Rugby were included for the first time in a Khelo India competition.

Panjab University finished first with 46 total medals that included 17 gold, 19 silver and 10 bronze medals. Savitribai Phule Pune University and Punjabi University were second and third with 37 and 33 total medals respectively. National record-holding sprinter, Dutee Chand participated representing KIIT. She won two gold medals in 100m and 200m events. Siddhant Sejwal of Panjab University and Sadhvi Dhuri of Pune University were the top performers with five gold medals each.

=== Universities ===
*	Host

University	State
Acharya Nagarjuna University	Andhra Pradesh
Andhra University	Andhra Pradesh
Bangalore University	Karnataka
Barkatullah University	Madhya Pradesh
Berhampur University	Odisha
Chaudhary Bansi Lal University	Haryana
Chaudhary Charan Singh University	Uttar Pradesh
Christ University	Karnataka
Cluster University of Jammu	Jammu and Kashmir
Dr. Babasaheb Ambedkar Marathwada University	Maharashtra
Gujarat University	Gujarat
Guru Jambheshwar University of Science and Technology	Haryana
Guru Nanak Dev University	Punjab
Hemchand Yadav Vishwavidyalaya	Chhattisgarh
Himachal Pradesh University	Himachal Pradesh
Hindustan Institute of Technology and Science	Tamil Nadu
Jadavpur University	West Bengal
Jain University	Karnataka
Jamia Millia Islamia	Delhi
Kalinga Institute of Industrial Technology*	Odisha
Kannur University	Kerala
Kaviyitri Bahinabai Chaudhari North Maharashtra University	Maharashtra
Kolhan University	Jharkhand
Krishna University	Andhra Pradesh
Kurukshetra University	Haryana
Lovely Professional University	Punjab
Maharaja Ganga Singh University	Rajasthan
Maharashtra University of Health Sciences	Maharashtra
Maharshi Dayanand University	Haryana
Mahatma Gandhi University	Kerala
Mangalore University	Karnataka
Manipur University	Manipur
Manonmaniam Sundaranar University	Tamil Nadu
Panjab University	Punjab
Periyar University	Tamil Nadu
Punjabi University	Punjab
Rajiv Gandhi University of Health Sciences	Karnataka
Ranchi University	Jharkhand
Rani Durgavati Vishwavidyalaya	Madhya Pradesh
Rashtrasant Tukadoji Maharaj Nagpur University	Maharashtra
Sant Baba Bhag Singh University	Punjab
Sant Gadge Baba Amravati University	Maharashtra
Sardar Patel University	Gujarat
Savitribai Phule Pune University	Maharashtra
Shivaji University	Maharashtra
SRM Institute of Science and Technology	Tamil Nadu
University of Calicut	Kerala
Delhi University	Delhi
University of Jammu	Jammu and Kashmir
University of Kerala	Kerala
University of Madras	Tamil Nadu
University of Mumbai	Maharashtra
University of Mysore	Karnataka
University of Rajasthan	Rajasthan
Veer Bahadur Singh Purvanchal University	Uttar Pradesh
Veer Narmad South Gujarat University	Gujarat
Visvesvaraya Technological University	Karnataka

Source: Khelo India

=== Medals tally ===
* Host nation (Host(s))

2020 Khelo India University Games
Rank	University	Gold	Silver	Bronze	Total
1	Panjab University	17	19	10	46
2	Savitribai Phule Pune University	17	11	9	37
3	Punjabi University	13	6	14	33
4	Maharshi Dayanand University	11	11	11	33
5	Mangalore University	9	7	9	25
6	Lovely Professional University	9	6	8	23
7	Jain University	8	6	2	16
8	Guru Nanak Dev University	7	6	12	25
9	University of Madras	7	5	3	15
10	University of Mumbai	6	9	10	25
11	University of Delhi	6	7	11	24
12	Mahatma Gandhi University	6	4	3	13
13	University of Kerala	5	2	5	12
14	Kurukshetra University	4	6	6	16
15	Shivaji University	4	5	10	19
16	Rajiv Gandhi University of Health Sciences	4	3	2	9
17	Kalinga Institute of Industrial Technology*	4	1	2	7
18	Chaudhary Bansi Lal University	4	0	2	6
19	University of Rajasthan	3	4	3	10
20	Maharaja Ganga Singh University	3	3	3	9
21	Manonmaniam Sundaranar University	3	2	2	7
22	Dr. Babasaheb Ambedkar Marathwada University	3	1	3	7
22	Veer Bahadur Singh Purvanchal University	3	1	3	7
24	Veer Narmad South Gujarat University	2	6	3	11
25	Barkatullah University	2	4	2	8
26	Chaudhary Charan Singh University	2	4	1	7
27	Guru Jambheshwar University of Science and Technology	2	3	3	8
28	Himachal Pradesh University	2	2	5	9
29	Sant Baba Bhag Singh University	2	2	3	7
30	Gujarat University	2	2	1	5

Source: Medal Tally

== 2022 edition ==
The second edition of the Khelo India University games was supposed to be held in the year 2021 but was later postponed to 2022 due to the COVID-19 pandemic in the country. It is to be hosted by Bangalore's Jain University and is expected to be held between April-May 2022. Jain University’s School of Engineering and Technology campus and The Sports School campus situated at Kanakapura Road are hosting majority of the events while some events are being hosted at different campuses of the university. However the opening ceremony is to be held in Sree Kanteerava Stadium in Bangalore while the closing ceremony is to held in the global campus of Jain University.

More than 5000 athletes from over 170 institutes are expected to take part in the games making it the biggest ever Khelo Games till date.

=== Universities ===
*	Host

University	State
Jain University	Karnataka

Rest of the participants are yet to be announced

== Sport events ==
- Archery
- Athletics
- Badminton
- Basketball
- Boxing
- Fencing
- Football
- Field hockey
- Judo
- Kabaddi
- Rugby union
- Shooting
- Swimming
- Table tennis
- Tennis
- Volleyball
- Weightlifting
- Wrestling
- Taekwondo
- Karate

== Gallery ==
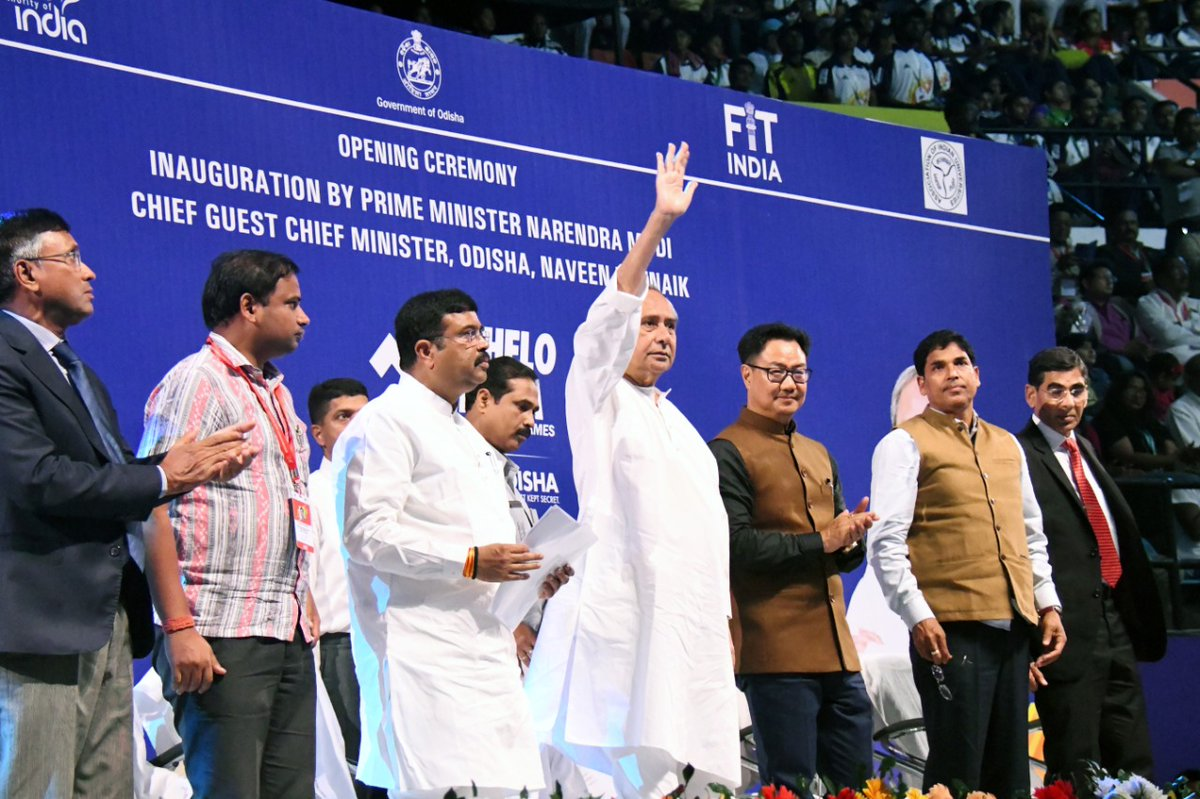
Chief Minister of Odisha inaugurating 2020 Khelo India University Games

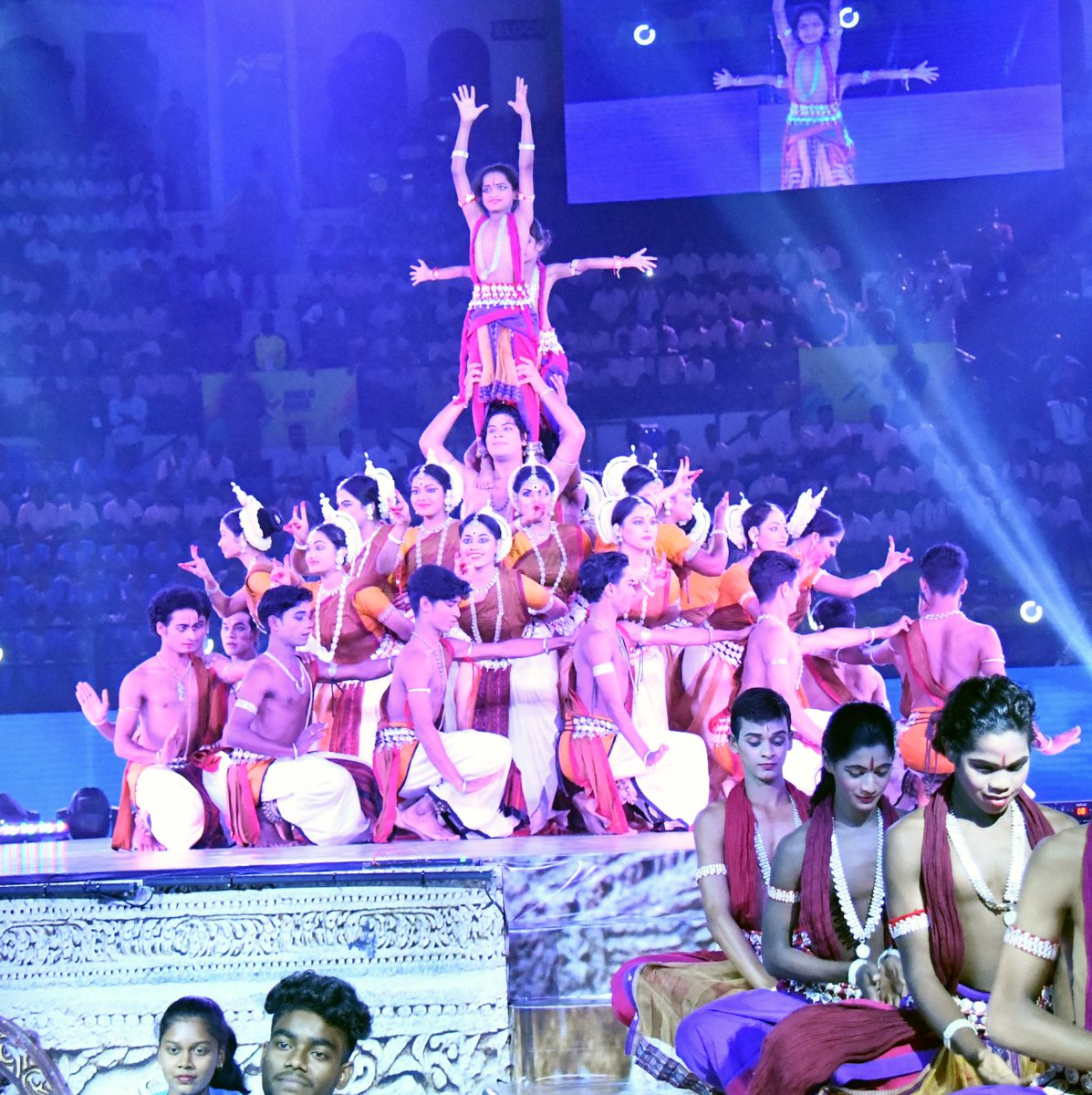
Dance performances at opening ceremony of 2020 Khelo India University Games

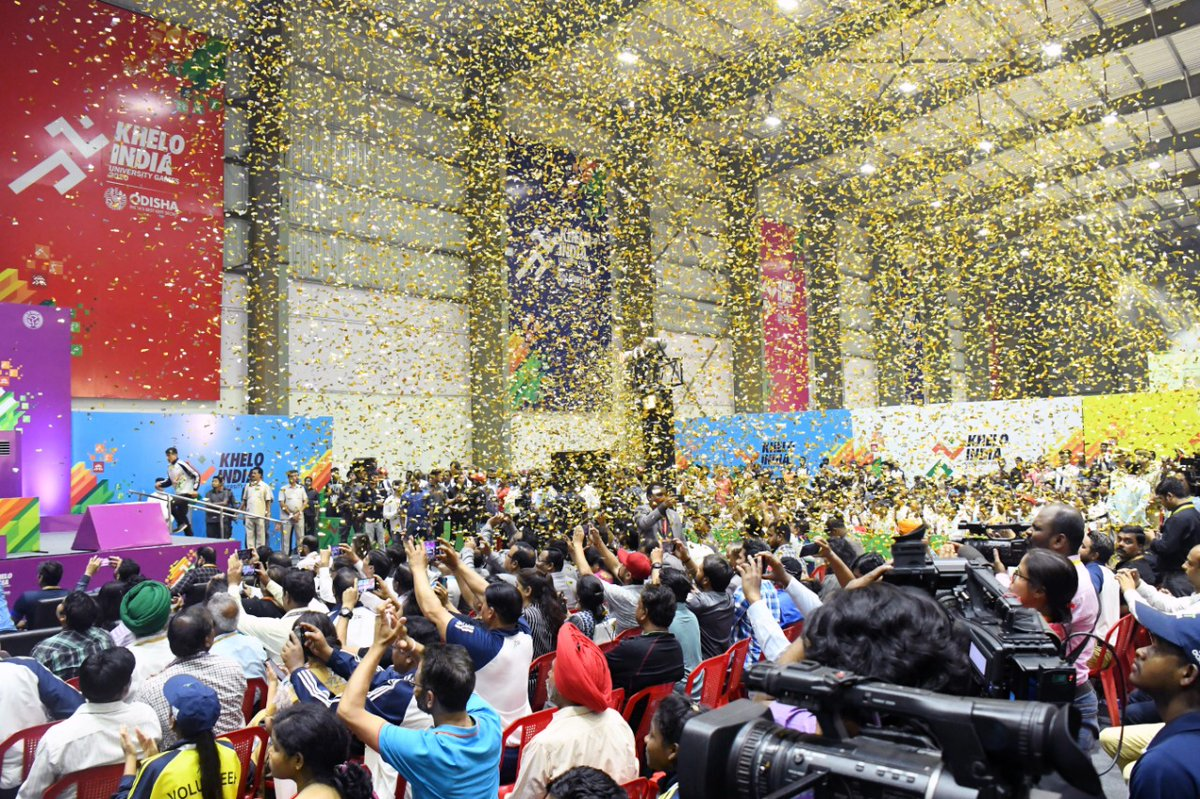
Closing ceremony of 2020 Khelo India University Games

== See also ==
- National Games of India
- Khelo India Winter Games
- Khelo India Beach Games
- Khelo India Youth Games
- Khelo India Para Games
