= 2023 Khelo India Para Games =

Khelo India Para Games 2023
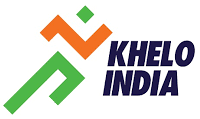
- Host city: New Delhi, India
- Athletes: 1350+
- Events: (7 sports)
- Opening: 10 December 2023
- Closing: 17 December 2023
- Main venue: Nehru Stadium, Dr. Karni Singh Shooting Range, and Indira Gandhi Arena

The inaugural 2023 Khelo India Para Games will be held from 10 to 17 December 2023.

There will be more than 1350 athletes from across the country, competing in athletics, shooting, archery, football, badminton, table tennis and weightlifting. The disciplines will be contested in the Nehru Stadium, Dr. Karni Singh Shooting Range, and Indira Gandhi Stadium.
