= Maulana Abul Kalam Azad Trophy =

Indian university sports award

- Rolling Trophy awarded to the best overall university in sports
- Sponsored by: Government of India
- Reward: ₹15 lakh (US$16,000)
- First award: 1956–1957
- Final award: 2024
- Most recent winner: Chandigarh University

Highlights
- Total awarded: 68
- First winner: Bombay University

The Maulana Abul Kalam Azad Trophy, is a sports honour of the Republic of India. The award is named after Abul Kalam Azad commonly referred to as Maulana Azad, one of the senior leaders of Indian national congress and first Minister of Education in independent India. It is awarded annually by the Ministry of Youth Affairs and Sports. It is a rolling trophy awarded to the "overall top performing University in sports and promoting competitive sports in University" over the preceding year. As of 2020, the award for the university securing first position comprises "a rolling MAKA trophy and a cash prize of ₹15 lakh (US$16,000)". The second- and third-place universities receive cash prizes of ₹7.5 lakh (US$8,000) and ₹4.5 lakh (US$4,800) respectively.

The trophy, initiated in 1956–1957, has been awarded a total of 68 times as of 2024. The objective of the trophy is to promote competitive sports, excellence in sports, and integrating sports and physical fitness amongst the Indian colleges and universities. The trophy is awarded annually with the other five National Sports Awards and national adventure award at the Presidential Palace presented by the President of India, usually on 29 August of a year. Six universities have won the trophy various times. Guru Nanak Dev University in Amritsar has won the trophy 25 times, most recently in the year 2023. Panjab University in Chandigarh has won the trophy 15 times, most recently in the year 2020, while Delhi University based in Delhi has won the trophy 14 times, most recently in the year 2000–2001. Other winners include Bombay University in Mumbai which won the inaugural trophy, Punjabi University in Patiala, Kurukshetra University in Kurukshetra, and Chandigarh University in Mohali.

== List of recipients ==
Recipients by number of times awarded
| University | Number of times awarded |
|---|---|
| University of Mumbai | 3 |
| Delhi University, Delhi | 14 |
| Guru Nanak Dev University, Amritsar | 24 |
| Kurukshetra University, Kurukshetra | 1 |
| Panjab University, Chandigarh | 15 |
| Punjabi University, Patiala | 9 |
| Chandigarh University, Mohali | 1 |

List of Maulana Abul Kalam Azad Trophy recipients, showing the year, university, and city
| Year | University | City |
|---|---|---|
| 1956–1957 | University of Mumbai | Mumbai |
| 1957–1958 | Panjab University | Chandigarh |
| 1958–1959 | Panjab University | Chandigarh |
| 1959–1960 | University of Mumbai | Mumbai |
| 1960–1961 | Panjab University | Chandigarh |
| 1961–1962 | Panjab University | Chandigarh |
| 1962–1963 | Delhi University | Delhi |
| 1963–1964 | Delhi University | Delhi |
| 1964–1965 | Delhi University | Delhi |
| 1965–1966 | Panjab University | Chandigarh |
| 1966–1967 | Kurukshetra University | Kurukshetra |
| 1967–1968 | Panjab University | Chandigarh |
| 1968–1969 | Panjab University | Chandigarh |
| 1969–1970 | Panjab University | Chandigarh |
| 1970–1971 | Panjab University | Chandigarh |
| 1971–1972 | Panjab University | Chandigarh |
| 1971–1972 | Delhi University | Delhi |
| 1972–1973 | Delhi University | Delhi |
| 1973–1974 | Delhi University | Delhi |
| 1974–1975 | Delhi University | Delhi |
| 1975–1976 | Delhi University | Delhi |
| 1976–1977 | Guru Nanak Dev University | Amritsar |
| 1977–1978 | Delhi University | Delhi |
| 1978–1979 | Guru Nanak Dev University | Amritsar |
| 1979–1980 | Guru Nanak Dev University | Amritsar |
| 1980–1981 | Guru Nanak Dev University | Amritsar |
| 1981–1982 | Guru Nanak Dev University | Amritsar |
| 1983–1984 | Guru Nanak Dev University | Amritsar |
| 1984–1985 | Guru Nanak Dev University | Amritsar |
| 1985–1986 | University of Mumbai | Mumbai |
| 1986–1987 | Guru Nanak Dev University | Amritsar |
| 1987–1988 | Delhi University | Delhi |
| 1988–1989 | Delhi University | Delhi |
| 1989–1990 | Delhi University | Delhi |
| 1990–1991 | Delhi University | Delhi |
| 1991–1992 | Guru Nanak Dev University | Amritsar |
| 1992–1993 | Guru Nanak Dev University | Amritsar |
| 1993–1994 | Guru Nanak Dev University | Amritsar |
| 1994–1995 | Panjab University | Chandigarh |
| 1995–1996 | Panjab University | Chandigarh |
| 1996–1997 | Guru Nanak Dev University | Amritsar |
| 1997–1998 | Guru Nanak Dev University | Amritsar |
| 1998–1999 | Guru Nanak Dev University | Amritsar |
| 1999–2000 | Guru Nanak Dev University | Amritsar |
| 2000–2001 | Delhi University | Delhi |
| 2001–2002 | Guru Nanak Dev University | Amritsar |
| 2002–2003 | Guru Nanak Dev University | Amritsar |
| 2003–2004 | Guru Nanak Dev University | Amritsar |
| 2004–2005 | Panjab University | Chandigarh |
| 2005–2006 | Guru Nanak Dev University | Amritsar |
| 2006–2007 | Punjabi University | Patiala |
| 2007–2008 | Punjabi University | Patiala |
| 2008–2009 | Punjabi University | Patiala |
| 2009–2010 | Guru Nanak Dev University | Amritsar |
| 2010–2011 | Guru Nanak Dev University | Amritsar |
| 2011–2012 | Punjabi University | Patiala |
| 2012–2013 | Punjabi University | Patiala |
| 2013–2014 | Punjabi University | Patiala |
| 2014–2015 | Punjabi University | Patiala |
| 2015–2016 | Punjabi University | Patiala |
| 2016–2017 | Punjabi University | Patiala |
| 2017–2018 | Guru Nanak Dev University | Amritsar |
| 2019 | Panjab University | Chandigarh |
| 2020 | Panjab University | Chandigarh |
| 2021 | Panjab University | Chandigarh |
| 2022 | Guru Nanak Dev University | Amritsar |
| 2023 | Guru Nanak Dev University | Amritsar |
| 2024 | Chandigarh University | Mohali |
