= Chandigarh University, Unnao =

Chandigarh University, Uttar Pradesh
- Other name: CU-UP
- Type: Private university
- Established: 2024
- Parent institution: Chandigarh University
- Affiliations: UGC
- Academic affiliations: BCI, PCI, AIU
- Chancellor: Satnam Singh Sandhu
- Location: Unnao, India; 26.6192°N 80.6883°E
- Campus: 100 acres (40 ha); Suburban
- Colours: Red, Black and White
- Website: culko.in

Chandigarh University, Uttar Pradesh (commonly known as CU-UP) is a Private university located in Unnao, Uttar Pradesh, with its main campus in Mohali, Punjab, India. The university was inaugurated by the Chief Minister of Uttar Pradesh on 26 July 2025.

== Campus ==
The campus features smart classrooms, advanced libraries, separate hostel and gymnasium facilities for boys and girls, and shuttle services to major neighboring cities.

== Academics and Facilities ==
CU-UP offers undergraduate and postgraduate programs in engineering, management, sciences, commerce, law, and pharmacy, among others. The university uses AI-powered tools for learning, supports research and innovation, and has sports and cultural amenities.

== Recognition ==
Chandigarh University, Uttar Pradesh is recognized by the UGC and the AIU.
