= Chandigarh University =

Private university in Mohali, Punjab, India

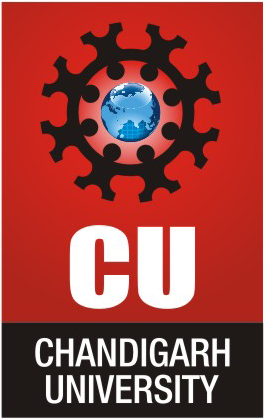
- Other name: CU
- Motto: Discover. Learn. Empower.
- Type: Private research university
- Established: July 10, 2012; 14 years ago
- Accreditation: NAAC (A+); NBA
- Affiliations: UGC, BCI, PCI, AIU, ACU, IAU, IEEE, ASME, ACS
- Budget: ₹689.43 crore (US$72 million) (FY2021–22)
- Chancellor: Satnam Singh Sandhu
- Vice-Chancellor: Dr. Raviraja N. Seetharam
- Academic staff: 2,537
- Students: 37,683 (fall 2025)
- Undergraduates: 30,002 (fall 2025)
- Postgraduates: 6,429 (fall 2025)
- Doctoral students: 1,252 (fall 2025)
- Location: Gharuan, Mohali, Punjab, India
- Campus: 250 acres (100 ha); Suburban
- Other campus: Unnao
- Colors: Red, black and white
- Nickname: CUians
- Website: cuchd.in

University rankings

Global – Overall
- QS World: 526 (2027)
- USNWR Global: 739 (2026)

National – Overall
- NIRF National: 19 (2025)

Chandigarh University (CU) is a private research university located in Mohali, within the Chandigarh Capital Region, Punjab, India. Established in 2012 by an act of the Punjab State Legislature. It is recognized by the University Grants Commission under Section 2(f) with the right to confer degrees as per Section 22(1) of the UGC Act, 1956.

The university traces its origins to Chandigarh Group of Colleges, which was founded by Satnam Singh Sandhu at Landran in Mohali in 2001. Since its establishment, the university has expanded into a multidisciplinary institution with its main campus at Gharuan. The university is active in university sports and extracurriculars, fielding teams in national inter-university competitions and hosting cultural and technical festivals.

The university places strong emphasis on research, innovation and international collaboration. It has substantial patent activity and extensive institutional partnerships. The university received an A+ grade in its first cycle of NAAC accreditation and has been ranked among India's leading universities in the National Institutional Ranking Framework.

== History ==
Chandigarh University was established by the Punjab State Legislature through The Chandigarh University Act, 2012, which came into force on 10 July 2012. The Act incorporated the university as a private, self-financed institution in Punjab and placed its headquarters at Gharuan in Sahibzada Ajit Singh Nagar district.

The university emerged from the educational work of Satnam Singh Sandhu, who founded Chandigarh Group of Colleges at Landran in Mohali in 2001 before establishing Chandigarh University in 2012. Public reporting has described this earlier phase as the foundation of a wider higher-education project that preceded the university by more than a decade.

From the beginning, Chandigarh University was designed as a multi-disciplinary institution. The Act authorised it to provide instruction, research, and training across a wide range of fields, and the university's official profile identifies it as recognised by the University Grants Commission under Section 2(f) with the right to confer degrees under Section 22(1) of the UGC Act, 1956. This legal and regulatory framework gave the university a broad mandate for academic expansion and allowed it to develop beyond its original founding context.

The university's early development was marked by rapid institutional growth and later recognition in accreditation and rankings. Chandigarh University states that it received an A+ grade from the National Assessment and Accreditation Council in its first cycle, and the university has since featured prominently in the National Institutional Ranking Framework. The university's own history and ranking pages present these developments as part of a broader phase of institutional consolidation after its establishment in 2012.

Chandigarh University also expanded its reach through international collaborations. In 2021, reports said that the university had signed MoUs with 306 foreign universities, reflecting a growing emphasis on student exchange, faculty exchange, and collaborative research. This internationalisation became one of the university's defining features in the years after its creation.

== Campuses ==
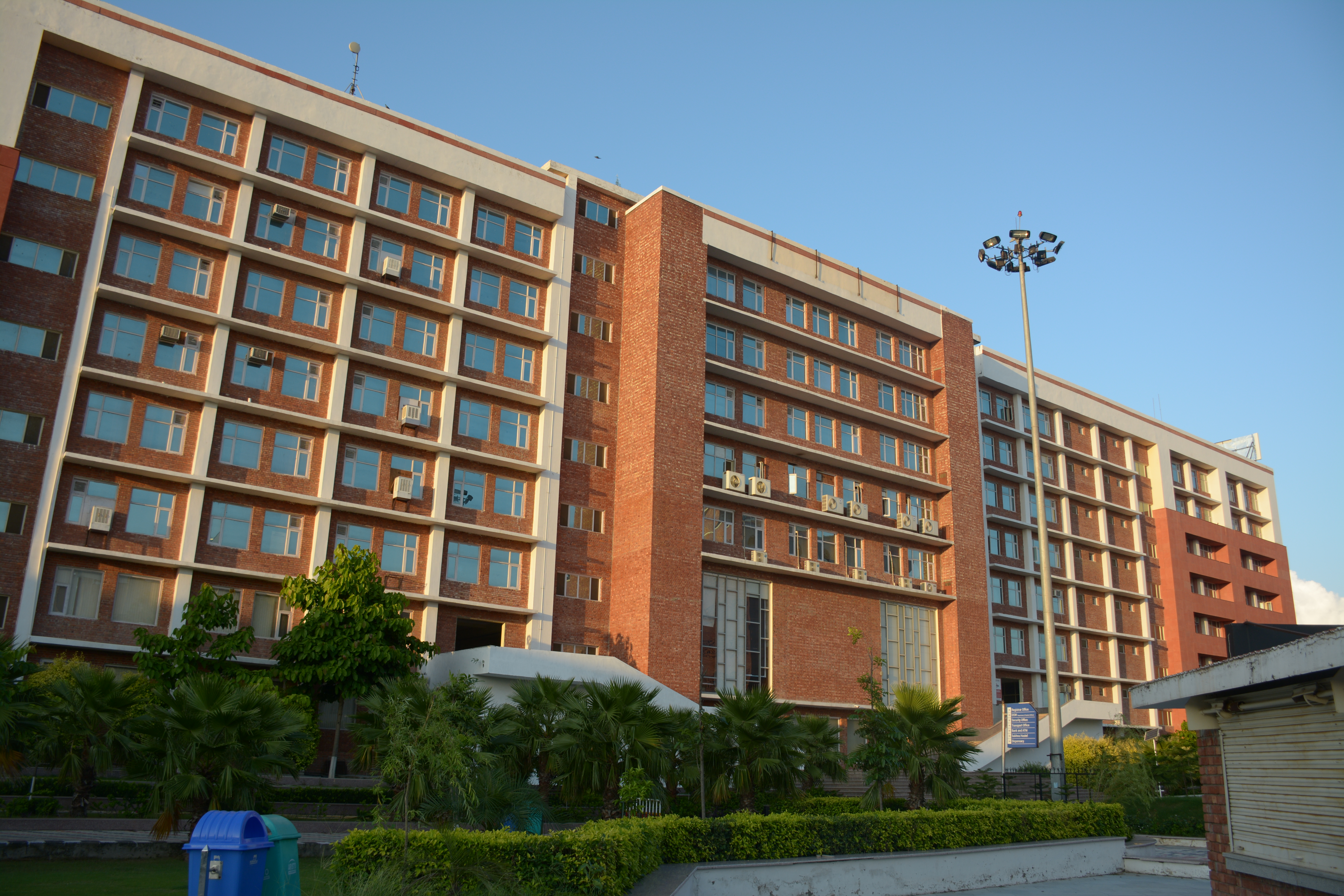
Main block

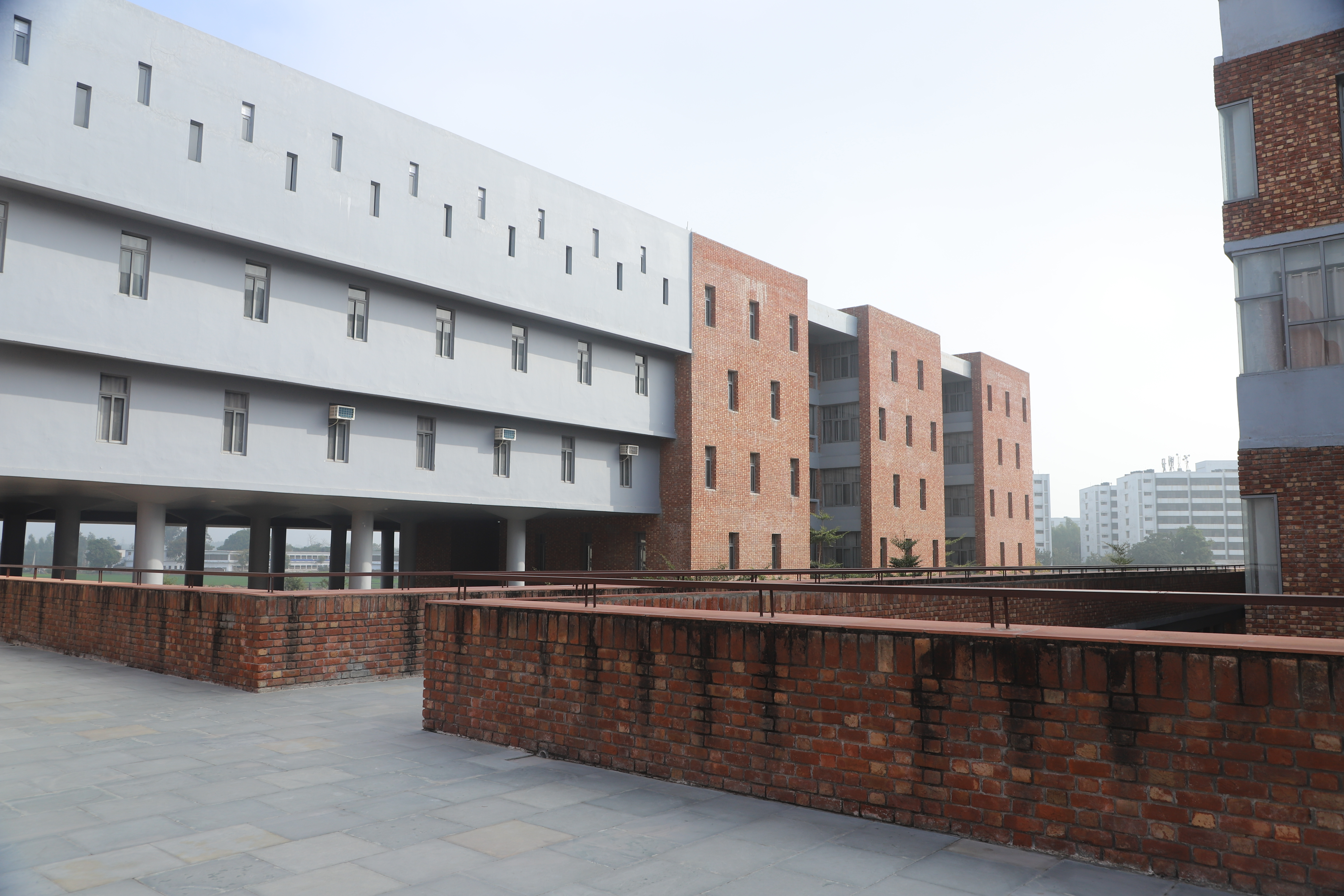
South Campus

Chandigarh University's main campus is located at Gharuan in Sahibzada Ajit Singh Nagar district (Mohali), Punjab, on the Chandigarh–Ludhiana Highway. The university's official profile describes the site as its principal campus and places it within the wider Chandigarh region, while the article on the university notes the same location in Gharuan, Mohali. The campus has been developed as a large suburban academic site rather than a city-centre institution, with the university presenting it as a purpose-built environment for teaching, research, and student life.

The campus is organised around a master-planned layout that combines academic, administrative, residential, and recreational facilities. Available descriptions of the site mention academic blocks, hostels, food courts, banking services, a dispensary, shops, and sports facilities, all arranged within the same campus complex. This integrated layout reflects the university's residential model and its effort to provide an environment in which students can live, study, and participate in extracurricular activity on the same grounds.

The main campus also serves as the centre of the university's academic and administrative system. Chandigarh University's governance and disclosure pages indicate that the institution's major authorities, offices, and internal structures operate from Gharuan, which makes the campus the base for central administration as well as instruction. In practical terms, this means that the campus functions not only as a teaching site but also as the headquarters from which academic policy, student services, examinations, and financial administration are coordinated.

As the university expanded, the Gharuan campus was developed to support increasing enrolment and a wider range of academic programmes. The site has been described as containing multiple academic blocks and specialised facilities for professional study, including separate spaces for law, engineering, and other disciplines. This expansion of physical infrastructure has paralleled the university's rise in accreditation and rankings, and the campus itself has become closely associated with the institution's identity and growth since its establishment in 2012.

The university has also expanded its physical presence beyond the original Mohali site. In 2024, media reports noted approval for the other campus in Unnao, Uttar Pradesh, a move toward a multi-campus model. That development marked an important step in the university's institutional expansion and suggested that its campus structure may increasingly extend beyond Punjab, while the Gharuan site continues to remain the primary campus.

== Organization and administration ==
Chandigarh University is governed under The Chandigarh University Act, 2012, which establishes a set of statutory authorities for the institution. The university's governance framework is centered on the Chancellor, the Vice-Chancellor, the Governing Body, the Board of Management, the Academic Council, and the Finance Committee.

The Chancellor is the head of the university's governing structure. Chandigarh University identifies Satnam Singh Sandhu as Chancellor, and the official governance material lists the Chancellor as chairman of the Governing Body. The Vice-Chancellor is the principal academic and executive officer of the university and is responsible for the day-to-day administration of the institution.

Under the Act and the university's disclosure material, the Governing Body includes the Chancellor, the Vice-Chancellor, representatives nominated by the sponsoring trust, representatives of the State Government, finance and management experts, and eminent educationists. The Board of Management has a similarly mixed composition and serves as the main executive body for institutional decisions, while the Academic Council is the principal academic authority responsible for academic standards, curricula, and examinations.

The Finance Committee oversees budgeting and financial planning. Because Chandigarh University is self-financed, financial oversight is an important part of its administration and supports the management of infrastructure, faculty recruitment, student services, and expansion. The university also names officers such as the Registrar and the Chief Finance and Accounts Officer among its senior administrative officials.

Chandigarh University's administrative structure is intended to support its educational mission, research activity, and institutional growth. The university presents its leadership system as one that combines trust-based governance, state representation, and academic management within a single statutory framework.

== Academics ==
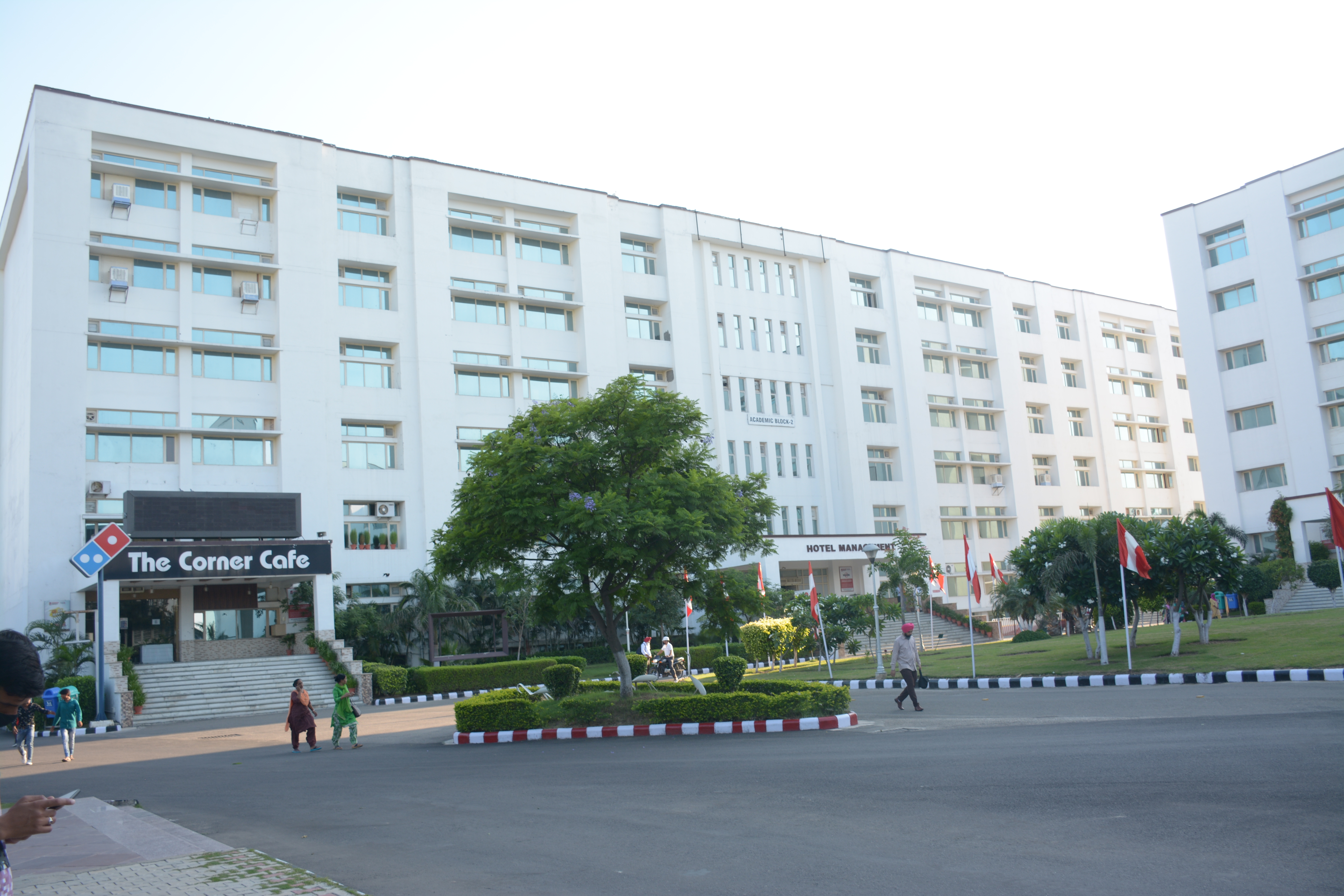
Faculty of Hotel Management

Chandigarh University offers undergraduate, post-graduate and doctorate degrees in engineering, management, computing, cognitive sciences, education, animation and multimedia, tourism, pharma sciences, biotechnology, architecture, commerce, legal studies, agricultural science, media studies, liberal arts, basic sciences and other professional areas.

The university organises its teaching through specialised schools and departments, with an emphasis on professional education and interdisciplinary study. Engineering, management, computing, applied sciences, legal studies, architecture, hospitality, pharmaceutical sciences, and media-related fields are among the core areas highlighted in its programme structure. This arrangement reflects the university's aim of combining conventional academic disciplines with career-oriented training and applied learning.

Chandigarh University places strong emphasis on research and innovation. Its research pages state that patent filing, collaborative research, and industry-linked projects are central to its teaching model, and the university says it works with national and international institutions for joint research and academic guidance. The university's international relations office also describes exchange programmes, collaborative research, scholarly meetings, and faculty development initiatives as part of its academic mission.

The institution's academic profile has been reinforced by accreditation and national ranking performance. Chandigarh University received an A+ grade from NAAC in its first cycle and has since placed well in the National Institutional Ranking Framework. These results have been used by the university to present itself as one of India's stronger private universities in terms of academic quality and institutional performance.

Internationalisation is a major part of the university's academic strategy. Chandigarh University has partnerships with more than 515 institutions in 100 countries, and its international relations materials describe student exchange, faculty exchange, internships, short courses, conferences, workshops, and collaborative research as routine parts of these partnerships. In recent years, the university has also announced new collaborations with institutions abroad, including universities in USA, UK, EU, Canada, Australia and SAARC countries, reflecting a continuing effort to expand its academic reach beyond India.

The university also emphasises experiential learning and industry exposure. Its official materials say that programmes are designed to be contemporary and relevant, with a focus on practical training, project work, and links to professional practice. This approach is intended to make graduates more employable while also aligning academic delivery with changing industry needs. The combination of broad programme coverage, research activity, and international exposure has become a defining feature of Chandigarh University's academic identity.

== Research and recognitions ==
Chandigarh University presents research as a central part of its academic identity. Its official research pages describe the university as having a large patent output, numerous departmental research groups, and a broad set of funded projects, placing research alongside teaching as one of its core institutional priorities. The university has also used its research profile to distinguish itself among Indian private universities.

The university has filed more than 5,900 patents, while earlier institutional pages had described it as having filed 900+ and later 1,000+ patents, indicating rapid growth in its intellectual property activity over time. Chandigarh University has also claimed that it ranks among the leading Indian institutions in patent filing, and it has repeatedly highlighted patent output as evidence of its research culture.

In addition to patents, the university reports extensive internal research activity through departmental research groups and funded projects. Its research pages say that more than 60 departmental research groups operate across the university, alongside government-funded projects and projects with international partners. This structure suggests a decentralised research environment in which individual schools and departments contribute to the university's overall output. The university also states that its projects include both externally funded work and collaborations with international organisations, reflecting an effort to integrate local and global research activity.

Research is closely tied to the university's programme structure and professional orientation. Chandigarh University says that its teaching and learning model is designed to keep courses contemporary and relevant, with research and patent filing at the core of that approach. The university's departments, including engineering, computing, pharmacy, civil engineering, and design, maintain discipline-specific patent and research pages, showing how research is embedded across academic units rather than confined to a single central centre.

The university's research strategy is also linked to international relations and collaboration. Its international relations materials describe academic partnerships, joint research, and scholarly exchange as part of the university's wider research enterprise. In practice, this places research within a broader framework that includes patents, collaborative projects, and cross-border academic ties, rather than treating it as a purely internal academic function.

=== Recognitions ===
Chandigarh University is recognized by the University Grants Commission (UGC). Approved by the All India Council for Technical Education (AICTE), National Council for Hotel Management and Catering Technology (NCHMCT), Bar Council of India (BCI), Pharmacy Council of India (PCI), Council of Architecture (COA), National Council for Teacher Education (NCTE), member of Association of Indian Universities (AIU), member of Computer Society of India (CSI), member of International Association of Universities (IAU), member of Association of Commonwealth Universities (ACU), member of Institute of Electrical and Electronics Engineers (IEEE), member of The American Society of Mechanical Engineers (ASME) and member of American Chemical Society (ACS).

== Student activities ==
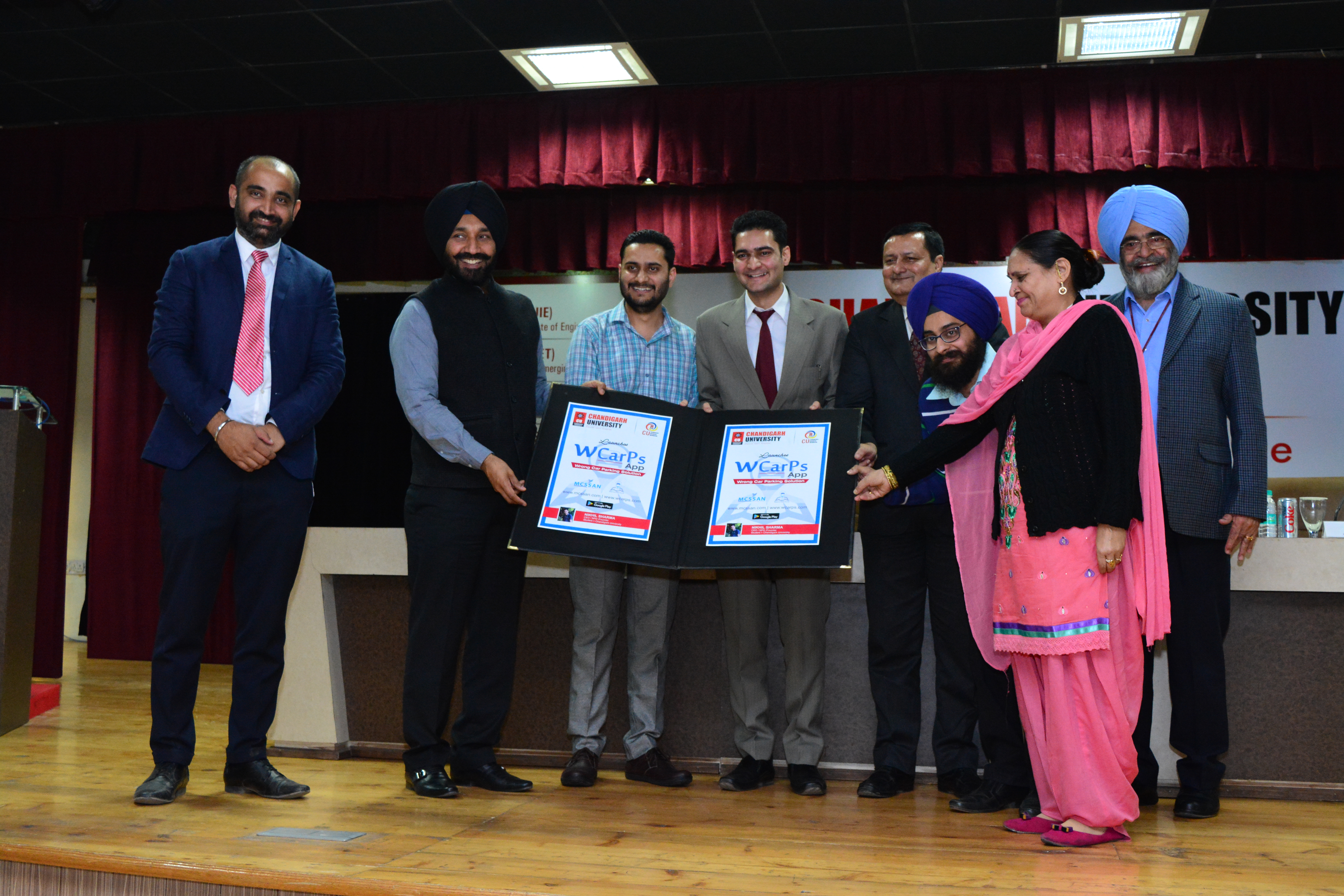
Launch of a student project in 2016

Chandigarh University maintains a substantial programme of student clubs, societies, and campus activities. Its official student activities portal says that the university has 37 clubs, 5 communities, 10 department societies, and 30 professional groups, indicating a large organised extracurricular structure within the university. These groups are presented as part of the university's broader effort to combine academic work with personal development, leadership training, and student engagement.

The university describes student activity as a core part of campus life rather than an optional supplement to classroom teaching. Its official materials say that cultural clubs and committees regularly organise inter-university competitions, performances, and campus events in music, dance, theatre, literature, and fine arts. The university presents these activities as a means of developing confidence, communication skills, and time management while also giving students a forum for self-expression.

A significant part of the student activity structure is organised around department-based clubs and professional societies. These include subject-linked groups in engineering, computing, management, liberal arts, and other disciplines, which are used for workshops, seminars, competitions, and leadership-oriented events. The university's departmental activity pages show that these societies are intended to deepen subject engagement while also giving students a platform for peer learning and practical experience.

The university also highlights event-based student life, including club meetings, cultural showcases, guest sessions, and large campus gatherings. One official report on the Spectrum Club described a meet-and-greet event with speaker sessions, membership drives, and interactive activities, illustrating the university's emphasis on student participation outside the classroom. Such events form part of a larger calendar of activities that is meant to keep student life active throughout the academic year.

Sports and recreational activity are also integrated into student life. The university's campus-life materials note the presence of sports facilities and hostel-based recreational options, including gym access and courts for volleyball, basketball, and badminton. These facilities support intramural activity, fitness, and informal student interaction, and they form part of the wider residential environment of the university. In combination with clubs and cultural events, the sports infrastructure helps create a campus culture that is not limited to classroom instruction.

== Athletics ==
Chandigarh University has developed a substantial sports programme through its Department of Sports, which the university describes as supporting students in maintaining an active lifestyle alongside academic study. The university's sports infrastructure includes facilities for athletics and other indoor and outdoor events, and sports participation is treated as part of campus life rather than as a separate activity.

In competitive university sport, Chandigarh University has become one of the most successful private universities in India. Its athletes have won major titles at the Khelo India University Games, and the university has reported topping the medal table in recent editions of the event. The university won the MAKA Trophy in 2024, becoming the first private university to receive the award since its inception, reflecting the scale of its university sports programme.

Chandigarh University's athletics results have been particularly strong in recent university competitions. Media reports on the 2025 Khelo India University Games said that CU athletes contributed medal-winning performances in athletics, including record-setting marks in hammer throw, race walk, and javelin throw. These results have been presented by the university as evidence of a broader sporting culture that extends across multiple disciplines, including athletics, swimming, wrestling, cycling, canoeing, and kayaking.

The university also participates in inter-university championships under the Association of Indian Universities and other sporting bodies. Its sports reporting highlights team and individual achievements, athlete development, and training support for students who compete at national level. In this respect, athletics at Chandigarh University functions both as a competitive discipline and as part of a wider student-development framework.

== Notable alumni ==
Chandigarh University maintains an official alumni portal that highlights graduates and former students active in fields such as sports, entertainment, entrepreneurship, and technology. The university's own pages frame alumni achievement as part of its campus culture and institutional identity, rather than as a separate afterthought.

Among the alumni and former students highlighted are Arshdeep Singh, an Indian cricketer; Maninder Singh, a hockey player; Bhagwan Singh, a rowing medalist; Shashi Chopra, a boxer; Palak Kohli, a para-badminton player; Tanya Mittal, an entrepreneur and pageant titleholder; Navv Inder, a singer; Parry G, a rapper; and Abhilipsa Panda, a singer. These names show the range of areas in which Chandigarh University alumni have become publicly visible, especially in sport, music, media, and entrepreneurship.

The university also uses alumni pages to showcase graduate outcomes from academic departments, especially engineering and computing. Departmental alumni pages include placements and career destinations in private companies, indicating that the university treats employability and professional progression as part of its alumni narrative. This approach is consistent with the university's broader emphasis on career-oriented education and industry-linked training.

Chandigarh University's alumni base is still developing, and much of its public alumni recognition comes from recent graduates and current public figures associated with the university. The university's official and semi-official pages therefore focus less on long-established legacy alumni and more on emerging names in sports, entertainment, technology, and business.
