= Khelo India Para Games =

Di sability sports event in India

- Abbreviation: KIPG
- Purpose: Enabling disabled athletes
- Frequency: Annual
- Inaugurated: 2023
- Most recent: 2025
- Headquarters: New Delhi, India
- Website: Khelo India Para Games

The Khelo India Para Games (KIPG) are an annual sports event under the Khelo India initiative for disabled athletes.

The inaugural KIPG was scheduled to happen in 2018, but did not take place, with Khelo India instead backing a separate competition called the Indian Open Para-Athletics Championship, which was held in Bengaluru. Later, it was announced that the inaugural KIPG would take place in December 2023.

One purpose of KIPG is to help disabled athletes receive recognition under the TOPS scheme.

== Editions ==
Khelo India Para Games
Edition	Year	Host(s)	Start Date	End Date	Sports	Gold	1st Team				2nd Team				3rd Team				Ref
Edition	Year	Host(s)	Start Date	End Date	Sports	Gold	Gold Medal	Silver Medal	Bronze Medal	T	Gold Medal	Silver Medal	Bronze Medal	T	Gold Medal	Silver Medal	Bronze Medal	T	Ref
I	2023	Delhi	10 December	17 December	7	173	Haryana				Uttar Pradesh				Tamil Nadu				
I	2023	Delhi	10 December	17 December	7	173	40	39	26	105	25	23	14	62	20	8	14	42	
II	2025	Delhi	20 March	27 March	6	189	Haryana				Tamil Nadu				Uttar Pradesh				
II	2025	Delhi	20 March	27 March	6	189	34	39	31	104	28	19	27	74	23	21	20	64	

== See also ==
- National Games of India
- Khelo India Winter Games
- Khelo India Beach Games
- Khelo India Youth Games
- Khelo India University Games
