= 2025 Khelo India Youth Games =

Multi-sport event season

Khelo India Youth Games 2025
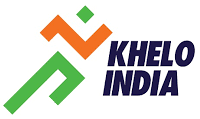
- Host city: Patna, Rajgir, Gaya, Bhagalpur, and Begusarai (all in Bihar, India)
- Athletes: 8500
- Events: (in 28 sports)
- Opening: 4 May 2025
- Closing: 15 May 2025
- Opened by: Narendra Modi

The 7th edition of the Khelo India Youth Games (KIYG) was held from 4 May 2025 to 15 May 2025, marking the first time the event took place in Bihar. This national multi-sport event brought together over 10,000 athletes from 28 states and 8 union territories, competing across 28 disciplines, including traditional Indian sports and esports as a demonstration category.

== Venues ==
The games were conducted across five cities in Bihar: Patna, Rajgir, Gaya, Bhagalpur, and Begusarai. (Additionally, New Delhi hosted events in shooting, gymnastics, and track cycling).

Key venues included:

- Patliputra Sports Complex, Patna
- BSAP 5 Indoor Stadium, Patna
- Rajgir Sports Complex, Rajgir
- Indian Institute of Management Bodh Gaya
- Sandish Compound
- IOCL Barauni and Yamuna Bhagat Stadium, Begusarai
- Bihar Institute of Public Administration & Rural Development-Open Ground, Gaya
- Indira Gandhi Arena

Other venues were IAS Bhawan for tennis and Gyan Bhawan for wrestling in Patna and so on.

== Sports events ==
There are 28 sports disciplines in Khelo India Youth Games 2025. Sepak takraw has been included for the first time on the back of India's gold medal in the 2025 ISTAF World Cup.

Sports event						
Archery	Cycling	Kabaddi	Table tennis	Athletics	Fencing	Football
Kho kho	Tennis	Badminton	Field hockey	Sepak takraw	Lawn bowling	Volleyball
Basketball	Gymnastics	Shooting	Rugby	Weightlifting	Boxing	Judo
Swimming	Wrestling	Mallakhamb	Gatka	Kalaripayattu	Thanga ta	Yogasana

Esports have been included as a demonstration sport.

== Mascot and Branding ==
The official mascot, Gajasimha, symbolizes the strength of an elephant and the courage of a lion. Inspired by the Pala dynasty's heritage from Nalanda and Bodh Gaya, Gajasimha was unveiled by Bihar's Chief Minister Nitish Kumar and Union Sports Minister Mansukh Mandaviya.

== Inauguration ==
Prime Minister Narendra Modi virtually inaugurated the games on 4 May 2025, with the opening ceremony held at the Patliputra Sports Complex in Patna. The event aimed to promote sports culture and infrastructure development in Bihar.

== Medal tally ==
The final medal tally of the 7th edition of Khelo India Youth Games is listed below. The host state, Bihar, is starred.

Rank	State/UT	Gold	Silver	Bronze	Total
1	Maharashtra	58	47	53	158
2	Haryana	39	27	51	117
3	Rajasthan	24	12	24	60
4	Karnataka	17	26	15	58
5	Delhi	16	20	32	68
6	Tamil Nadu	15	21	29	65
7	Uttar Pradesh	14	20	18	52
8	Kerala	12	5	8	25
9	Manipur	11	8	11	30
10	Madhya Pradesh	10	9	13	32
11	Assam	10	5	10	25
12	Telangana	9	3	11	23
13	Punjab	8	14	25	44
14	Jharkhand	8	7	6	21
15	Bihar (*Host)	7	11	18	36
16	Chandigarh	6	7	4	17
17	Odisha	5	6	3	14
18	Andhra Pradesh	3	11	10	24
19	Chhattisgarh	3	1	10	14
20	Uttarakhand	3	1	7	11
21	Gujarat	2	4	7	13
22	West Bengal	1	11	4	16
23	Jammu & Kashmir	1	2	2	5
24	Nagaland	1	1	4	6
25	Arunachal Pradesh	1	0	2	3
26	Mizoram	1	0	1	2
27	Himachal Pradesh	0	3	2	5
28	Puducherry	0	1	1	2
29	Meghalaya	0	0	2	2
29	Tripura	0	0	2	2
30	Andaman & Nicobar Islands	0	0	1	1
30	Goa	0	0	1	1
30	Sikkim	0	0	1	1

Maharashtra secured its third consecutive KIYG title with a record 158 medals, including 58 golds, showcasing dominance across multiple disciplines.Haryana excelled in sports like fencing and athletics, finishing second with 107 medals .Rajasthan achieved its best-ever finish, clinching third place with 22 golds. Bihar, the host state, delivered a historic performance, securing 7 golds among 36 total medals, marking a significant improvement from its previous standings having a Jump from 28th rank to 15th rank marking its best ever performance in the all editions of KIYG, they doubled their all edition medal tally having total of 29 medals in previous 6 editions by securing 36 medals in the single seventh edition including victories in athletics, Thang-Ta, and rugby.

== Notable Performances ==
- Samuel Zadeng (Mizoram): Won gold in the boys' 70 kg boxing category, marking Mizoram's first medal in this edition.
- Harshal Joge (Maharashtra): Clinched gold in the boys' 800 meters race, contributing to Maharashtra's medal tally.
- Anjali Rawat (Madhya Pradesh): Secured gold in Thang-Ta (Phunaba Ama 56 kg category).
- Khushi Yadav (Bihar): triumphed in the girls' 2000m steeplechase, clocking 9:52.10.
- Aisengfa Gogoi (Assam): Broke the national youth record in the 55 kg weightlifting category with a total lift of 183 kg.

== Broadcasting ==
The games were broadcast live on DD Sports and streamed online via the Prasar Bharati YouTube channel, ensuring wide accessibility for viewers across the country.
