= 2021 Khelo India Youth Games =

Multi-sport event season

Khelo India Youth Games 2021
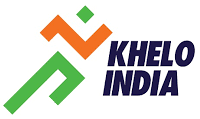
- Host city: Panchkula, Haryana, India
- Teams: 36
- Athletes: 4700
- Events: 462 (in 25 sports)
- Opening: 4 June 2022
- Closing: 13 June 2022
- Opened by: Manohar Lal Khattar; Anurag Thakur
- Main venue: Tau Devi Lal Stadium

The 2021 Khelo India Youth Games is the fourth edition, of the Khelo India Youth Games. After being postponed thrice due to COVID-19, the Khelo India Youth Games 2021 were held from 4–13 June 2022 across multiple venues. Haryana hosted the bulk of the events and Panchkula, Haryana, India is named as the host city. The event witnessed 25 national-level multidisciplinary grassroots games. The event was held in 25 disciplines and all of India’s 36 states and Union Territories participated at the KIYG for the first time. Khelo India programme's inaugural edition was held in New Delhi in 2018, while Pune and Guwahati hosted 2nd and 3rd edition in 2019 and 2020 respectively. The winner of the fourth edition of KIYG was Haryana who edged past defending champions Maharashtra who finished 2nd. Karnataka for the first time finished in the 3rd position. Sikkim, Nagaland, and Lakshadweep were the only participants not to win a single medal.

== Sports events ==
There are 25 sports disciplines in Khelo India Youth Games 2021. five new indigenous sports, mallakhamb, gatka, kalaripayattu, thang-ta and yogasana, have been added to the sports list for the 2021 edition.

Sports event
Archery	Cycling	Kabaddi	Table tennis	Athletics
Football	Kho-Kho	Tennis	Badminton	Field hockey
Lawn bowling	Volleyball	Basketball	Gymnastics	Shooting
Weightlifting	Boxing	Judo	Swimming	Wrestling
Mallakhamb	Gatka	Kalaripayattu	Thang-ta	Yogasana

== Medal tally ==
The medal tally of the 4th edition of Khelo India Youth Games is listed below. The host state, Haryana, is highlighted.

* Host nation (Haryana)

Rank	State	Gold	Silver	Bronze	Total
1	Haryana*	52	39	46	137
2	Maharashtra	45	40	40	125
3	Karnataka	22	17	28	67
4	Manipur	19	4	5	28
5	Kerala	18	19	18	55
6	Delhi	15	15	49	79
7	Tamil Nadu	14	14	24	52
8	Madhya Pradesh	12	11	15	38
9	Punjab	11	15	16	42
10	Rajasthan	8	9	15	32
11	West Bengal	7	8	12	27
12	Uttar Pradesh	6	17	19	42
13	Chandigarh	5	4	7	16
14	Gujarat	4	11	9	24
15	Andhra Pradesh	4	4	5	13
16	Jammu and Kashmir	3	5	6	14
17	Jharkhand	3	3	6	12
18	Himachal Pradesh	3	2	1	6
19	Andaman and Nicobar Islands	3	1	1	5
20	Assam	2	11	8	21
21	Telangana	2	4	7	13
22	Chhattisgarh	2	3	6	11
23	Tripura	2	1	4	7
24	Mizoram	2	1	1	4
25	Goa	2	1	0	3
26	Odisha	1	5	3	9
27	Arunachal Pradesh	1	4	2	7
28	Bihar	1	0	1	2
29	Uttarakhand	0	3	2	5
30	Ladakh	0	1	1	2
31	Dadra and Nagar Haveli and Daman and Diu	0	1	0	1
32	Puducherry	0	0	3	3
33	Meghalaya	0	0	1	1
Totals (33 entries)		269	273	361	903
