= Uzbekistan national rugby sevens team =

Uzbekistan
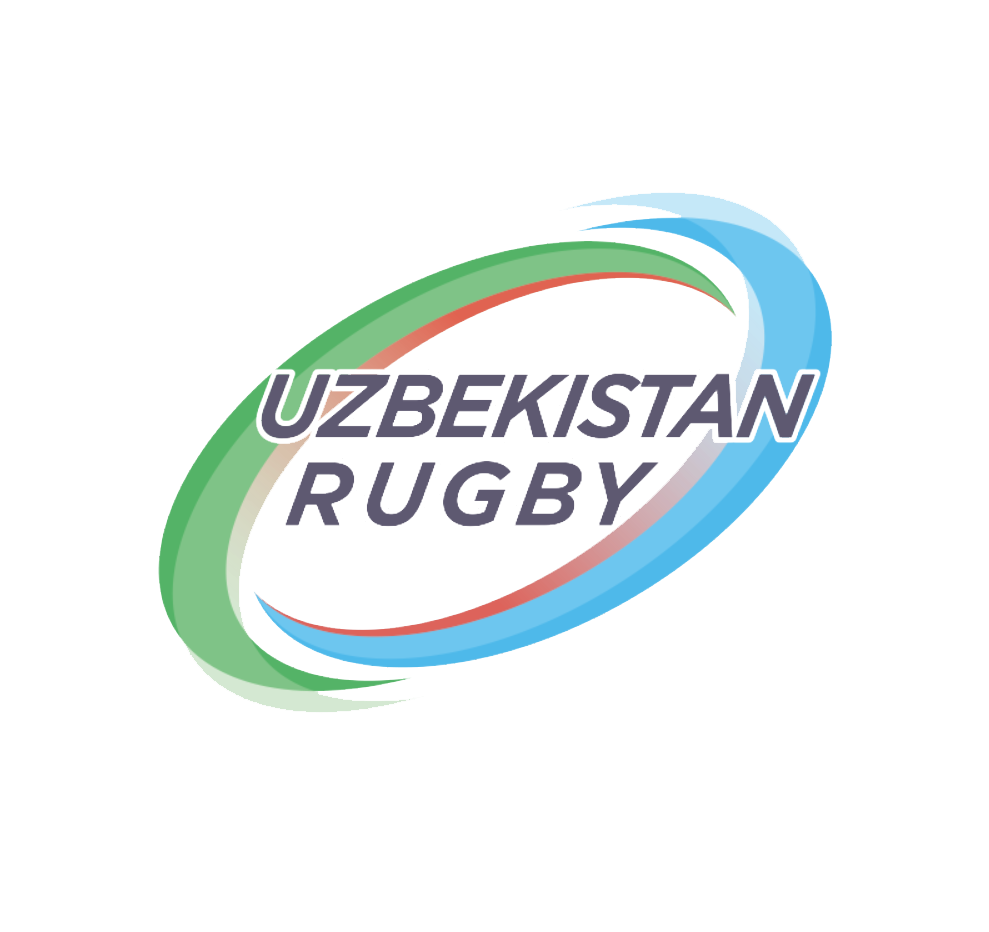
- Union: Uzbekistan Rugby Federation
Team kit

The Uzbekistan national rugby sevens team represents Uzbekistan in international rugby sevens competitions.

== Results ==
=== 2010 ===
Rugby Sevens – Uzbekistan internationals in 2010
Date	Location	Opposition	Result	Tournament
2–3 April	New Delhi	India		2010 Commonwealth Games Sevens Test Event
2–3 April	New Delhi	Brunei		2010 Commonwealth Games Sevens Test Event
2–3 April	New Delhi	Iran		2010 Commonwealth Games Sevens Test Event

=== 2026 Seven Results ===
1. Uzbekistan 14-21 Singapore
2. Uzbekistan 19-14 India
3. Uzbekistan 14-17 Kazakhstan
4. Uzbekistan 0-48 Hong Kong
5. Uzbekistan 0-33 Thailand
6. Uzbekistan 10-29 Malaysia

Central Asia & South Asia 7s

1. Uzbekistan 5-29 Sri Lanka
2. Uzbekistan 35-5 Mongolia
3. Uzbekistan 20-7 Pakistan
4. Uzbekistan 12-24 India
5. Uzbekistan 28-5 Pakistan
6. Uzbekistan 47-0 Kyrgyzstan

=== 2025 Seven Results ===
1. Uzbekistan 12-28 Singapore
2. Uzbekistan 10-5 South Korea
3. Uzbekistan 5-31 Malaysia
4. Uzbekistan 14-26 Sri Lanka
5. Uzbekistan 0-31 China
6. Uzbekistan 15-14 Philippines
7. Uzbekistan 24-5 Singapore
8. Uzbekistan 0-34 Hong Kong
9. Uzbekistan 12-21 Malaysia
10. Uzbekistan 5-29 United Arab Emirates
