= Bihar Olympic Association =

Bihar Olympic

- Abbreviation: BOA
- Type: Sports Association
- Headquarters: Patna, Bihar
- Members: Indian Olympic Association; Olympic Council of Asia
- Interim chairman: Bholanath Singh
- Website: olympic.ind.in/member-unit

Bihar Olympic Association (BOA) is responsible for organizing various State level tournaments in coordination with other Bihar State Sports Organization and Government of Bihar. BOA is an affiliated member of Indian Olympic Association.

Indian Olympic Association has dissolved the Bihar Olympic Association (BOA) for lack of governance, transparency, and administrative inefficiency. IOA president PT Usha has formed a five-member ad hoc committee led by Hockey India secretary general Bholanath Singh to take interim charge of BOA

== Executive Board (2025–present) ==
In elections held in Hajipur on 1 May 2025, the following officials were elected to the Bihar Olympic Association executive board.

| Position | Name |
|---|---|
| President | Ajay Kumar |
| Secretary | Pradeep Kumar |
| Treasurer | Mohd Mukhtar Khan |
| Executive Members | Akhouri Bishwajeet, Nutan Kumari, Manoj Kumar, Anish Bari, Suman Mishra |

== Affiliated State Sports Organisation ==
| Sport | State Sports Organisation |
|---|---|
| Athletics | Bihar Athletics Association |
| Badminton | Bihar Badminton Association |
| Basketball | Basketball Association of Bihar |
| Boxing | Boxing Association Of Bihar |
| Canoeing | Bihar Kayaking and Canoeing Association |
| Cycling | Cycling Association Of Bihar |
| Fencing | Bihar State Fencing Association |
| Football | Bihar Football Association |
| Handball | Bihar Handball Association |
| Hockey | Hockey Association of Bihar |
| Judo | Bihar State Judo Association |
| Kabaddi | Bihar State Kabaddi Association |
| Karate | State Karate Association of Bihar |
| Rugby | Rugby Football Association of Bihar |
| Shooting | Bihar State Rifle Association |
| Taekwondo | Bihar Taekwondo Association |
| Volleyball | Bihar Volleyball Association |
| Weightlifting | Bihar Weightlifter Association |
| Wrestling | Bihar Wrestling Association |
| Wushu | Bihar Wushu Association |
