= Jhanjeri =

Village in India

Coordinates: 30°41′N 76°37′E

Jhanjeri is a village in the SAS Nagar district and comes under Kharar Tehsil as per the latest records total of 3269 people (mainly Sikhs and Hindus) are living here as per 2011 census data, also some Muslim families are living there. Its pin code or better known as postal code is 140307. The official language of communication is native Punjabi. It is known for Chandigarh Group of Colleges, Jhanjeri, a college group affiliated with Punjab Technical University. The Village is also having another college called Quest Group of Institutions. The Village is facing untidy surrounding due to urban mess and swear water issues as reported in 2017.
