= Bihar State Kabaddi Association =

State governing body of Kabaddi in Bihar

- Sport: Kabaddi
- Jurisdiction: Bihar
- Abbreviation: BSKA
- Affiliation: Amateur Kabaddi Federation of India
- Headquarters: Patna
- President: Apoorva Sukhant
- Secretary: Vipul Kumar Singh

Official website
- www.biharkabaddi.com

Bihar State Kabaddi Association (BSKA) is the governing body for the sport of Kabaddi in the Indian state of Bihar. The association is affiliated with the Amateur Kabaddi Federation of India and the Bihar Olympic Association.

== Office Bearers ==
In September 2024, the Bihar State Kabaddi Association elected its new office bearers.

Position	Name
President	Apoorva Sukhant
Secretary	Vipul Kumar Singh
Vice Presidents	Saroj Kumar; Kunal Anand; Sanjay Kumar Singh
Treasurer	Harishankar
Joint Secretaries	Pankaj Kumar Kashyap; Kamal Kumar Patel; Amit Kumar
Executive Members	Roushan Kumar; Prashant Raj; Yashpal Singh; Meenu Kumar Singh; Rinku Kumari

== See also ==
- Amateur Kabaddi Federation of India
- Bihar Olympic Association
