= Sandish Compound =

Sports complex in Bhagalpur, Bihar, India

Coordinates: 25°15′9″N 86°59′41″E

Sandy's Compound is a 30-year-old sports complex located in, Bhagalpur City, Bihar, opposite of police line Bhagalpur. It contains a Doordarshan TV Centre, volleyball court and a small open stadium. It also provides state level matches and is one of the best fields in Bhagalpur.

The land was acquired by the government for public purposes in 1906, and was named after a Briton who was the Mayor of Bhagalpur.

In 1981, the stadium hosted its only cricket match when Bihar cricket team played against Assam cricket team in the 1981/82 Ranji Trophy. Bihar cricket team won the match by an innings and 2 runs.
