= Khelo India Beach Games =

National multi-sport event held in India

- Abbreviation: KIBG
- Purpose: Multi-sport events across Indian beaches
- Frequency: Annual
- Inaugurated: 2025
- Website: Khelo India Beach Games

Khelo India Beach Games (KIBG) is a national level multi-sport event held in India, where athletes across the country compete in six beach sports, namely beach soccer, beach volleyball, sepak takraw, beach kabaddi, pencak silat and open water swimming. Mallakhamb and tug of war are also held with the games for demonstration purposes. The inaugural edition of KIBG was held in 2025 on the Ghoghla Beach in Diu, from 19-24 May, with Manipur winning the competition.

== Editions ==
Khelo India Beach Games
Edition	Year	Host(s)	Start Date	End Date	Sports	Gold	1st Team				2nd Team				3rd Team				Ref
Edition	Year	Host(s)	Start Date	End Date	Sports	Gold	Gold Medal	Silver Medal	Bronze Medal	T	Gold Medal	Silver Medal	Bronze Medal	T	Gold Medal	Silver Medal	Bronze Medal	T	Ref
I	2025	Diu	19 May	24 May	6	46	Manipur				Maharashtra				Nagaland				
I	2025	Diu	19 May	24 May	6	46	5	6	3	14	5	5	10	20	5	3	5	13	

== See also ==
- National Games of India
- Khelo India Winter Games
- Khelo India Youth Games
- Khelo India Para Games
- Khelo India University Games
