= CGC University, Mohali =

Private university in Punjab, India

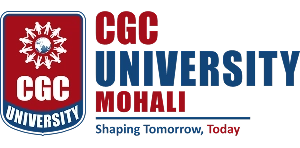
- Motto: Shaping Tomorrow, Today
- Type: Private research university
- Established: 2025; 1 year ago
- Accreditation: National Assessment and Accreditation Council (NAAC) A+
- Affiliations: UGC, NAAC, AIU, ACU, IET
- Chancellor: S. Rashpal Singh Dhaliwal
- Vice-Chancellor: Dr. Vinay Goyal
- Faculty: 1000+
- Students: 15,000+
- Location: State Highway 12A, Chandigarh - Sirhind Road, Mohali, Punjab, 140307, India; 30°24′40″N 76°23′43″E
- Campus: 30 hectares (70 acres); Rural
- Colors
- Nickname: CGC University
- Website: www.cgcuniversity.in

CGC University, Mohali is a private university located in Mohali, Punjab, India. The university was established in 2025 by an act of the Punjab State Legislature. It is recognized by the University Grants Commission under Section 2(f) with the right to confer degrees as per Section 22(1) of the UGC Act, 1956.

== History ==
CGC University, Mohali, formerly known as Chandigarh Group of Colleges, Jhanjeri (CGC Jhanjeri), was established in 2012 by S. Rashpal Singh Dhaliwal. Chandigarh Group of Colleges, Jhanjeri was a part of the CGC Group which was established in 2002. In August 2025, CGC Jhanjeri announced its transition to CGC University Mohali.

== Academics ==
CGC University, Mohali offers undergraduate, postgraduate, and doctoral programmes in disciplines including engineering, management, law, pharmacy, and allied sciences. Its academic structure includes the School of Engineering and Technology, School of Management Studies, School of Advanced Computing, School of Pharmaceutical Sciences, School of Allied and Health Sciences, School of Liberal Arts and Languages, School of Legal Studies, and School of Physical Education and Sports Sciences, which offer programmes such as B.Tech, M.Tech, BBA, B.Com (Hons), MBA, BCA, MCA, D.Pharm, B.Pharm, BPT, BA, B.Sc., LLB, BA LL.B, BBA LL.B, and LLM.

== Campus ==
The campus of CGC University, Mohali is spread over approximately 70 acres and currently utilized student capacity i.e. 15,000 students. It is located on State Highway 12A (Chandigarh–Sirhind Road).
