= Khelo India Youth Games =

Youth sporting event

- Abbreviation: KIYG
- Purpose: Grassroot talent hunt
- Frequency: Annual
- Inaugurated: 2018
- Most recent: 2025
- Headquarters: New Delhi, India
- Website: Khelo India Youth Games

Khelo India Youth Games (KIYG) are the annual national level multidisciplinary grassroot games in India held in January or February for two categories, namely under-17 years school students and under-21 college students. Every year best 1,000 kids will be given an annual scholarship of ₹5 lakh (US$5,200) for 8 years to prepare them for the international sporting events.

The Training of Trainers Programme was held in December 2018–January 2019 in the first phase. A total of 160 young athletes were trained in 4 batches of 40 each in the December to January period. It will continue semi-annually or quarterly to include all the interested teachers, principals, vice-principals and physical education trainers.

== History ==
On 31 January 2018, Prime Minister, Narendra Modi, inaugurated Khelo India School Games at the opening ceremony based on Guru–shishya tradition held at Indira Gandhi Arena. from the 2019 events, Khelo India School Games were renamed to Khelo India Youth Games after Indian Olympic Association came on board earlier in September 2018. The second edition of the event was kicked off in Shree Shiv Chhatrapati Sports Complex, a sports complex situated in Balewadi, Pune, by Sports Minister, Rajyavardhan Singh Rathore, and, Chief Minister of Maharashtra, Devendra Fadnavis.

On 27 February 2019, PM Narendra Modi launched the Khelo India App at the Youth Indian Parliament in Vigyan Bhawan, New Delhi to promote sports and fitness.

On 22 February 2020, Prime Minister Narendra Modi inaugurated the first edition of the Khelo India University Games in Cuttack to give athletes the exposure of multi-disciplinary events at the university level.

=== Games and medals ===
The inaugural 2018 games had students competing for 209 gold medals across 17 sports.

Badminton, basketball, boxing, cricket (26 gold medals), gymnastics (20 gold medals), judo (16 gold medals), kabaddi, volleyball and wrestling (30 gold medals) were held at the Indira Gandhi Indoor Stadium Complex. Athletics (36 gold medals), football, kho kho and weightlifting (16 gold medals) were held at the Jawaharlal Nehru Stadium. Swimming at the Shyama Prasad Mukherjee Swimming Complex (35 gold medals), hockey at the Dhyan Chand National Stadium and shooting at the Dr. Karni Singh Shooting Range were other venues.

In December 2020 four indigenous games were added – Gatka, Kalaripayattu, Thang-Ta and Mallakhamba.

== Execution ==
=== Selection criteria ===
Only selected school kids below the age of 17 years are eligible to compete. In the individual sports, top 8 sportsperson from the SGFI National School Games, 4 nominations from federation, one from Central Board of Secondary Education, one from the host State and 2 wild card entries for the individual events will be selected. In team sports, the top 4 from the National School Games, 2 nominations by the federation, 1 from the host State and one from the organising committee will be selected. For archery, badminton and shooting, the top 16 from the National School Games, 8 nominations by the federation, 1 from CBSE, 1 from host State, 1 from organising committee, and 6 from wild cards will be selected.

=== Talent hunt and scholarship ===
To identify the talent at grassroot level, each sports has a dedicated talent hunt committee, who will identify top 2 sportsperson for each sports and they will be given an annual scholarship of INR 500,000 for 8 years. Additionally, medal winners in all Khelo India competitions will now be eligible for government jobs, as per a revised criteria.

== Edition-wise medal tally ==
Khelo India Youth Games
Edition	Year	Host(s)	Start date	End date	Sports	Gold	1st Team				2nd Team				3rd Team				Ref
Edition	Year	Host(s)	Start date	End date	Sports	Gold	Gold Medal	Silver Medal	Bronze Medal	T	Gold Medal	Silver Medal	Bronze Medal	T	Gold Medal	Silver Medal	Bronze Medal	T	Ref
I	2018	Delhi	31 January 2018	8 February 2018	16	209	Haryana				Maharashtra				Delhi				
I	2018	Delhi	31 January 2018	8 February 2018	16	209	38	26	38	102	36	32	43	111	25	29	40	94	
II	2019	Maharashtra	9 January 2019	20 January 2019	18	403	Maharashtra				Haryana				Delhi				
II	2019	Maharashtra	9 January 2019	20 January 2019	18	403	85	62	81	228	62	56	60	178	48	37	51	136	
III	2020	Assam	10 January 2020	22 January 2020	20	447	Maharashtra				Haryana				Delhi				
III	2020	Assam	10 January 2020	22 January 2020	20	447	78	77	101	256	68	60	72	200	39	36	47	122	
IV	2021	Haryana	4 June 2022	13 June 2022	25	269	Haryana				Maharashtra				Karnataka				
IV	2021	Haryana	4 June 2022	13 June 2022	25	269	52	39	46	137	45	40	40	125	22	17	28	67	
V	2023	Madhya Pradesh	30 January 2023	11 February 2023	27	295	Maharashtra				Haryana				Madhya Pradesh				
V	2023	Madhya Pradesh	30 January 2023	11 February 2023	27	295	56	55	50	161	41	32	55	128	39	30	27	96	
VI	2024	Tamil Nadu	19 January 2024	31 January 2024	27	278	Maharashtra				Tamil Nadu				Haryana				
VI	2024	Tamil Nadu	19 January 2024	31 January 2024	27	278	57	48	53	158	38	21	39	98	35	22	46	103	
VII	2025	Bihar	4 May 2025	15 May 2025	27	285	Maharashtra				Haryana				Rajasthan				
VII	2025	Bihar	4 May 2025	15 May 2025	27	285	58	47	53	158	39	27	51	117	24	12	24	60	

== See also ==
- National Games of India
- Khelo India Winter Games
- Khelo India Beach Games
- Khelo India Para Games
- Khelo India University Games
