= 2020 Khelo India Youth Games =

Multi-sport event season

Khelo India Youth Games 2020
- Host city: Guwahati, Assam, India
- Teams: 37
- Athletes: 10000 (est.)
- Events: 451 (in 20 sports)
- Opening: 10 January 2020
- Closing: 22 January 2020
- Opened by: Sarbananda Sonowal (Chief Minister of Assam) and Kiren Rijiju (Sports Minister of India)
- Torch lighter: Hima Das
- Main venue: Indira Gandhi Athletic Stadium
- Website: www.kiyg2020guwahati.in

The third Khelo India Youth Games was held from 10 January 2020 and 22 January 2020 in Guwahati, Assam, India. The event witnessed 20 national level multidisciplinary grassroots games to get played among the age groups of under-17 and under-21 categories. Maharashtra defended its title as they topped the medal tally with 78 Gold medals, 77 Silver medals and 101 Bronze medals. The winning contingent of Maharashtra also broke their previous record of total medal haul of 228 medals created at Pune, by winning a total of 256 medals. The event is held in 20 disciplines with the participation of 37 states and Union Territories. Khelo India programme's inaugural edition was held in New Delhi in 2018, while Pune hosted 2nd edition in 2019.

Every year best performing 1000 participants are given an annual scholarship of Rs 500,000 for 8 years to prepare them for international sporting events.

== Sports events ==
There are 20 sports disciplines in Khelo India Youth Games 2020. Cycling and Lawn Bowls are the new additional games of this year's event.

Sports event
Archery	Cycling	Kabaddi	Table tennis
Athletics	Football	Kho-Kho	Tennis
Badminton	Field hockey	Lawn bowling	Volleyball
Basketball	Gymnastics	Shooting	Weightlifting
Boxing	Judo	Swimming	Wrestling

== Medals tally ==
The final medal tally of the 3rd edition of Khelo India Youth Games is listed below. The host state, Assam, is highlighted.

* Host nation (Host(s))

Rank	State	Gold	Silver	Bronze	Total
1	Maharashtra	78	77	101	256
2	Haryana	68	60	72	200
3	Delhi	39	36	47	122
4	Karnataka	32	26	22	80
5	Uttar Pradesh	29	28	30	87
6	Tamil Nadu	22	32	22	76
7	Assam*	20	22	34	76
8	West Bengal	19	14	20	53
9	Gujarat	16	16	20	52
10	Punjab	16	15	28	59
11	Rajasthan	15	24	12	51
12	Madhya Pradesh	15	11	20	46
13	Kerala	15	5	20	40
14	Manipur	14	20	20	54
15	Telangana	7	6	8	21
16	Chandigarh	6	2	9	17
17	Odisha	5	8	8	21
18	Andaman and Nicobar Islands	5	2	1	8
19	Uttarakhand	4	4	11	19
20	Tripura	4	1	0	5
21	Jharkhand	3	9	7	19
22	Andhra Pradesh	3	7	7	17
23	Arunachal Pradesh	3	5	4	12
24	Mizoram	3	2	5	10
25	Himachal Pradesh	2	3	2	7
26	Jammu and Kashmir	2	3	1	6
27	Chhattisgarh	1	2	4	7
28	Bihar	1	1	7	9
29	Goa	0	3	9	12
30	Daman and Diu	0	1	0	1
31	Ladakh	0	0	1	1
31	Puducherry	0	0	1	1
31	Sikkim	0	0	1	1
Totals (33 entries)		447	445	554	1,446

Source: Khelo India
