= Rugby Football Association of Bihar =

Indian sports body

- Sport: Rugby union
- Founded: 2017
- Asia Rugby affiliation: 2017
- Headquarters: LIG Sector 3, Block 1, Flat No. 75, Bahadurpur Housing Colony, Kankarbagh, Patna, Bihar - 800020
- President: Sanjay Prakash Mayukh
- Secretary: Pankaj Kumar Jyoti
- Website: rugbyindia.in

The Rugby Football Association of Bihar, also known as Bihar Rugby Football Association, abbreviated ("RFAB") is the governing body for rugby union in Bihar, India. It is a member of India Rugby Football Union with a seat on that body's Executive Council. It is affiliated with the Bihar Olympic Association.

== Administration ==
The following is the current organisational structure of Rugby Football Association of Bihar:

Position	Name
President	(India) Sanjay Prakash Mayukh
Secretary	(India) Pankaj Kumar Jyoti

== See also ==
- Bihar Olympic Association
- Bihar Football Association
- India national rugby union team
- India women's national rugby union team
- India national rugby sevens team
