= 2008 Asian Five Nations division tournaments =

- Date: 4 June 2008 – 15 November 2008
- Countries: (19) Refer to division

Tournament statistics
- Matches played: 20
- Official website: Website

The 2008 Asian Five Nations division tournaments, known as the 2008 HSBC Asian 5 Nations due to the tournament's sponsorship by the HSBC, was a rugby tournament played in divisions. This was the 1st series of the Asian Five Nations, following the merge of the ARFU Asian Rugby Series and Asian Rugby Championship.

There were two main divisions, with three further regional divisions. The winners of Division 1 would be promoted up to the Top Division for 2009, as will the winner of Division 2 being promoted to Division 1. The loser of Division 1, drops to Division 2.

Scoring system: 5 points for a win, three for a draw, one bonus point for being within seven points of the winning team, and one for four tries.

== Teams ==
The teams involved, with their world rankings pre tournament, were:

Division 1

- Chinese Taipei (48)
- Singapore (55)
- Sri Lanka (50)

Division 2

- India (81)
- Malaysia (79)
- Pakistan (NA)
- Thailand (65)

South-East Asia Division

- Cambodia (NA)
- Indonesia (NA)
- Laos (NA)

Pacific-Asia Division

- Brunei (NA)
- Guam (83)
- Philippines (NA)

Central Asia Division

- Iran (NA)
- Kyrgyzstan (NA)
- Uzbekistan (NA)

Other Regions

- Macau (NA)
- Mongolia (NA)
- Qatar (NA)

== Division 1 ==
Key to colours
Earns Promotion
Relegated

2008 Asian Five Nations division 1
Tournament details
- Host: Taiwan
- Date: 11 – 15 November 2008
- Countries: 4

Final positions
- Champions: Singapore
- Relegated: China

Tournament statistics
- Matches played: 4

=== Standings ===
Position	Nation	Games				Points				Table points
Position	Nation	Played	Won	Drawn	Lost	For	Against	Difference	Tries	Table points
1	Singapore	2	1	1	0	43	42	+1	4	8
2	Chinese Taipei	2	1	0	1	57	46	+11	6	7
3	Sri Lanka	2	0	1	1	43	55	-12	4	3
4	China	0	0	0	0	0	0	0	0	0

- China withdrew due to lack of visa availability and were relegated to Division Two.
- Standings were determined according to the same method used in the HSBC Asian Five Nations championship.
- Singapore promoted to main tournament for 2009 edition.

=== Fixtures ===
11 November 2008
7.00 p.m

Sri Lanka	20–20	Singapore

Tainan, Taiwan

13 November 2008
3.00 p.m

Chinese Taipei	22–23	Singapore

Tainan, Taiwan

15 November 2008
3.00 p.m

Chinese Taipei	35–23	Sri Lanka

Tainan, Taiwan

== Division 2 ==
Key to colours
Earns Promotion
Relegated

2008 Asian Five Nations division 2
Tournament details
- Host: Thailand
- Date: 11 – 14 June 2008
- Countries: 4

Final positions
- Champions: Thailand

Tournament statistics
- Matches played: 4

Division Two served as the first round of qualifying for the 2011 Rugby World Cup, as the Division Two champion would be promoted to Division One for 2009 and have the opportunity to be promoted to the HSBC Asian Five Nations for the 2010 season. The 2010 HSBC Asian Five Nations will be the final qualifying stage for the Asian representative at the 2011 Rugby World Cup.

Semi-finals
11 June 2008
Malaysia	30
Pakistan	5
11 June 2008
Thailand	30
India	22

Final
14 June 2008
Malaysia	7
Thailand	30
3rd-Place final
14 June 2008
Pakistan	0
India	92

=== Fixtures ===
==== Semi finals ====
11 June 2008

Malaysia	30–5	Pakistan

Bangkok, Thailand

11 June 2008

Thailand	30–22	India

Bangkok, Thailand

==== Third v Fourth Final ====
14 June 2008

Pakistan	0–92	India

Bangkok, Thailand

==== Final ====
14 June 2008

Thailand	30–7	Malaysia

Bangkok, Thailand

- Tournament winner Thailand promoted to Division One for 2009.
- There will be no relegation for fourth placed team Pakistan.

== Regional Divisions ==
Key to colours
Earns Promotion
Relegated

=== South-East Asia ===
Position	Nation	Games				Points				Table points
Position	Nation	Played	Won	Drawn	Lost	For	Against	Difference	Tries	Table points
1	Indonesia	2	2	0	0	78	14	+64	0	10
2	Laos	2	1	0	1	44	23	+21	0	5
3	Cambodia	2	0	0	2	3	88	-85	0	0

12 July 2008

Laos	33–0	Cambodia

Jakarta, Indonesia

15 July 2008

Indonesia	23–11	Laos

Jakarta, Indonesia

19 July 2008

Indonesia	55–3	Cambodia

Jakarta, Indonesia

=== Pacific-Asia ===
Position	Nation	Games				Points				Table points
Position	Nation	Played	Won	Drawn	Lost	For	Against	Difference	Tries	Table points
1	Philippines	2	2	0	0	121	8	113	18	10
2	Guam	2	1	0	1	82	20	62	0	5
3	Brunei	2	0	0	2	0	175	-175	0	0

28 June 2008

Guam	74–0	Brunei

Wettengel Rugby Field, Dededo, Guam

2 July 2008

Brunei	0–101	Philippines
	Report

Wettengel Rugby Field, Dededo, Guam

5 July 2008

Guam	8–20	Philippines
	Report

Wettengel Rugby Field, Dededo, Guam
Attendance: 500
Referee: Akihisa Aso (Japan)

=== Central Asia ===
Position	Nation	Games				Points				Table points
Position	Nation	Played	Won	Drawn	Lost	For	Against	Difference	Tries	Table points
1	Iran	2	2	0	0	38	22	16	6	10
2	Uzbekistan	2	0	1	1	21	23	-2	2	3
3	Kyrgyzstan	2	0	1	1	31	45	-14	3	3

5 October 2008

Kyrgyzstan	16–30	Iran

Spartak Stadium, Bishkek
Referee: (India) Greg Davey

8 October 2008

Iran	8–6	Uzbekistan

Spartak Stadium, Bishkek
Referee: (Sri Lanka) Fernando Dilroy

10 October 2008

Kyrgyzstan	15–15	Uzbekistan

Spartak Stadium, Bishkek

=== Other Regions ===
Position	Nation	Games				Points				Table points
Position	Nation	Played	Won	Drawn	Lost	For	Against	Difference	Tries	Table points
1	Qatar	0	0	0	0	0	0	0	0	0
2	Mongolia	0	0	0	0	0	0	0	0	0
3	Macau	0	0	0	0	0	0	0	0	0

- Cancelled

== See also ==
- 2008 Asian Five Nations
