= 2011 Asian Five Nations division tournaments =

- Date: 4 May 2011 – 30 July 2011
- Countries: (18) Refer to division

Tournament statistics
- Matches played: 18
- Official website: Website

- For main Top 5 Division, see: 2011 Asian Five Nations

The 2011 Asian Five Nations division tournaments, known as the 2011 HSBC Asian 5 Nations due to the tournament's sponsorship by the HSBC, refer to the divisions played within the tournament. This was the 4th series of the Asian Five Nations.

There were five divisional teams in the 2011 version who contested for a place in the Top 5 tournament. Who ever finished last place in a division was relegated, while the winner of a division was promoted. Last place in division 1 was replaced by the winner of division 2, winner of division 3 replaced last place in division 2, winner in division 4 replaced last in division 3 and winner in division 5 replaced last in division 4.

== Changes from 2010 ==
- South Korea becomes one of the first Asian Top 5 giants to be relegated to Division 1.
- Sri Lanka are no longer competing in Division 1, following promotion to the Top 5 Division.
- Philippines have replaced Chinese Taipei in Division 1, with Chinese Taipei competing in Division 2.
- Iran will compete in Division 2 - replacing China, following promotion from Division 3.
- Cambodia and Laos form a newly introduced Division 5.

== Teams ==
The teams involved, with their world rankings pre tournament, were:

Division 1

- Malaysia (58)
- Philippines (NA)
- Singapore (51)
- South Korea (34)

Division 2

- Chinese Taipei (61)
- India (75)
- Iran (NA)
- Thailand (60)

Division 3

- China (66)
- Guam (82)
- Indonesia (NA)
- Pakistan (NA)

Division 4

- Jordan (NA)
- Lebanon (NA)
- Qatar (NA)
- Uzbekistan (NA)

Division 5

- Cambodia (NA)
- Laos (NA)

== Division 1 ==
Key to colours
Earns Promotion
Relegated

2011 Asian Five Nations division 1
Tournament details
- Host: South Korea
- Date: 1 – 4 June 2011
- Countries: 4

Final positions
- Champions: South Korea
- Relegated: Malaysia

Tournament statistics
- Matches played: 4

Semi-finals
June 1, 2011
Singapore	52
Malaysia	17
June 1, 2011
South Korea	34
Philippines	20

Final
June 4, 2011
Singapore	19
South Korea	58
Third place play-off
June 4, 2011
Malaysia	20
Philippines	86

=== Semi-finals ===
1 June 2011
13:00

Singapore	52–17	Malaysia

Ansan Wa~ Stadium, Ansan

1 June 2011
15:00

South Korea	34–20	Philippines

Ansan Wa~ Stadium, Ansan

=== Third place play-off ===
4 June 2011
13:00

Malaysia	20–86	Philippines

Ansan Wa~ Stadium, Ansan

Malaysia are relegated to Division II for 2012.

=== Finals ===
4 June 2011
15:00

Singapore	19–58	South Korea

Ansan Wa~ Stadium, Ansan

South Korea are promoted to the 2012 Asian Five Nations.

== Division 2 ==
Key to colours
Earns Promotion
Relegated

2011 Asian Five Nations division 2
Tournament details
- Host: Thailand
- Date: 4 – 7 May 2011
- Countries: 4

Final positions
- Champions: Chinese Taipei
- Relegated: India

Tournament statistics
- Matches played: 4

Semi-finals
May 4, 2011
Chinese Taipei	34
Iran	31
May 4, 2011
India	24
Thailand	37

Final
May 7, 2011
Chinese Taipei	22
Thailand	10
Third place play-off
May 7, 2011
Iran	30
India	19

=== Semi-finals ===
4 May 2011
15:00

Chinese Taipei	34–31	Iran

National Stadium, Bangkok

4 May 2011
17:30

India	24–37	Thailand

National Stadium, Bangkok

=== Third place play-off ===
7 May 2011
14:00

Iran	30–19	India

National Stadium, Bangkok

India are relegated to Division III for 2012.

=== Finals ===
7 May 2011
16:00

Chinese Taipei	22–10	Thailand

National Stadium, Bangkok

Chinese Taipei are promoted to Division I for 2012.

== Division 3 ==
Key to colours
Earns Promotion
Relegated

2011 Asian Five Nations division 3
Tournament details
- Host: Indonesia
- Date: 22 – 25 June 2011
- Countries: 4

Final positions
- Champions: China

Tournament statistics
- Matches played: 4

Semi-finals
June 22, 2011
Pakistan	10
Guam	37
June 22, 2011
China	32
Indonesia	23

Final
June 25, 2011
Guam	18
China	28
Third place play-off
June 25, 2011
Pakistan	19
Indonesia	20

=== Semi-finals ===
22 June 2011
13:00

Pakistan	10–37	Guam

UPH Stadium, Jakarta

22 June 2011
16:00

China	32–23	Indonesia

UPH Stadium, Jakarta

=== Third place play-off ===
25 June 2011
13:00

Pakistan	19–20	Indonesia

UPH Stadium, Jakarta

Pakistan are relegated to Division IV for 2012.

=== Final ===
25 June 2011
16:00

Guam	18–28	China

UPH Stadium, Jakarta

China are promoted to Division II in 2012.

== Division 4 ==
Key to colours
Earns Promotion
Relegated

2011 Asian Five Nations division 4
Tournament details
- Host: United Arab Emirates
- Date: 11 – 13 May 2011
- Countries: 4

Final positions
- Champions: Qatar

Tournament statistics
- Matches played: 4

Semi-finals
May 11, 2011
Uzbekistan	15
Lebanon	34
May 11, 2011
Jordan	8
Qatar	26

Final
May 13, 2011
Lebanon	14
Qatar	29
Third place play-off
May 13, 2011
Uzbekistan	14
Jordan	17

=== Semi-finals ===
11 May 2011
17:00

Uzbekistan	15–34	Lebanon

The Sevens, Dubai

11 May 2011
19:00

Jordan	8–26	Qatar

The Sevens, Dubai

=== Third place play-off ===
13 May 2011
18:00

Uzbekistan	14–17	Jordan

The Sevens, Dubai

Uzbekistan are relegated to Division V for 2012.

=== Final ===
13 May 2011

Lebanon	14–29	Qatar

The Sevens, Dubai

Qatar are promoted to Division III for 2012.

2011 Asian Five Nations division 5
- Date: 16 – 30 July 2011
- Countries: 2

Final positions
- Champions: Laos

Tournament statistics
- Matches played: 2

== Division 5 ==
Key to colours
Earns Promotion
Relegated

16 July 2011

Cambodia	19–21	Laos

Phnom Penh

30 July 2011

Laos	11–7	Cambodia

Vientiane

Laos are promoted to Division IV for 2012.
