= 2012 Asian Five Nations division tournaments =

- Date: 15 April 2012 – 30 June 2012
- Countries: (19) Refer to division

Tournament statistics
- Matches played: 21
- Official website: Website

For main Top 5 Division, see: 2012 Asian Five Nations

The 2012 Asian Five Nations division tournaments, known as the 2012 HSBC Asian 5 Nations due to the tournament's sponsorship by the HSBC, refer to the divisions played within the tournament. This was the 5th series of the Asian Five Nations.

There were five divisions in the 2012 version who contested for a place in the Top 5 tournament. Who ever finished last place in a division was relegated, while the winner of a division was promoted. Last place in division 1 was replaced by the winner of division 2, winner of division 3 replaced last place in division 2, winner in division 4 replaced last in division 3 and winner in division 5 replaced last in division 4.

== Changes from 2011 ==
- Sri Lanka participated in the Division 1 tournament, haven been relegated from the Top 5.
- South Korea returned to the Top 5 division, after a year in the First Division.
- Chinese Taipei have replaced Malaysia in Division 1, with Malaysia competing in Division 2.
- China will compete in Division 2 - replacing India, following promotion from Division 3.
- Brunei joins Cambodia and Laos in Division 5.

== Teams ==
The teams involved, with their world rankings pre tournament, were:

Division 1

- Chinese Taipei (57)
- Philippines (72)
- Singapore (52)
- Sri Lanka (46)

Division 2

- China (62)
- Iran (NA)
- Malaysia (63)
- Thailand (65)

Division 3

- Guam (88)
- Indonesia (77)
- India (NA)
- Pakistan (73)

Division 4

- Jordan (NA)
- Lebanon (NA)
- Qatar (NA)
- Uzbekistan (NA)

Division 5

- Brunei (NA)
- Cambodia (NA)
- Laos (NA)

== Division 1 ==
Key to colours
| Earns Promotion |
| Relegated |

2012 Asian Five Nations division 1
Tournament details
- Host: Philippines
- Date: 15 – 21 April 2012
- Countries: 4

Final positions
- Champions: Philippines
- Relegated: Singapore

Tournament statistics
- Matches played: 6

For the first time, division one was held in a round-robin format. All games were played in Manila, Philippines on April 14–21, 2012. The Philippines was promoted to the main division in 2013, while Singapore was relegated to division II for 2013.

=== Table ===
| Position | Nation | Games | | | | Points | | | Bonus points | Total points |
| Position | Nation | Played | Won | Lost | Drawn | For | Against | Difference | Bonus points | Total points |
|---|---|---|---|---|---|---|---|---|---|---|
| 1 | Philippines | 3 | 3 | 0 | 0 | 99 | 36 | +63 | 3 | 18 |
| 2 | Sri Lanka | 3 | 2 | 1 | 0 | 89 | 36 | +53 | 2 | 12 |
| 3 | Chinese Taipei | 3 | 1 | 2 | 0 | 69 | 94 | −25 | 1 | 6 |
| 4 | Singapore | 3 | 0 | 3 | 0 | 51 | 114 | −64 | 1 | 1 |

Points are awarded to the teams as follows:

| Results | Points |
|---|---|
| Win | 5 points |
| Draw | 3 points |
| 4 or more tries | 1 point |
| Loss within 7 points | 1 point |
| Loss greater than 7 points | 0 points |

=== Fixtures ===
15 April 2012
17:00

| Sri Lanka | 36–8 | Chinese Taipei |
| | Report |

Rizal Memorial Stadium, Manila
Referee: Warren Needham (Hong Kong)

15 April 2012
19:00

| Singapore | 20–37 | Philippines |
| | Report |

Rizal Memorial Stadium, Manila
Referee: Dhamapalage Nimal (Sri Lanka)

18 April 2012
17:00

| Sri Lanka | 35–10 | Singapore |
| | Report |

Rizal Memorial Stadium, Manila
Referee: Dewi Rowlands (Hong Kong)

18 April 2012
19:00

| Philippines | 34–12 | Chinese Taipei |
| | Report |

Rizal Memorial Stadium, Manila
Referee: Paul Mckay (Singapore)

21 April 2012
17:00

| Sri Lanka | 18–28 | Philippines |
| | Report |

Rizal Memorial Stadium, Manila
Referee: Taizo Hirabayashi (Japan)

21 April 2012
19:00

| Singapore | 31–49 | Chinese Taipei |
| | Report |

Rizal Memorial Stadium, Manila
Referee: Jimmy Toda (Japan)

== Division 2 ==
Key to colours
| Earns Promotion |
| Relegated |

2012 Asian Five Nations division 2
Tournament details
- Host: Malaysia
- Date: 31 May – 2 June 2012
- Countries: 4

Final positions
- Champions: Thailand
- Relegated: China

Tournament statistics
- Matches played: 4

Semi-finals
May 31, 2012
Thailand | 37
Iran | 17
May 31, 2012
Malaysia | 89
China | 0

Final
June 2, 2012
Thailand | 22
Malaysia | 19
Third place play-off
June 2, 2012
Iran | 52
China | 3

=== Semi-finals ===
31 May 2012
14:30

| Thailand | 37–17 | Iran |
| | Report |

Royal Selangor Club, Kuala Lumpur

31 May 2012
16:30

| Malaysia | 89–0 | China |
| | Report |

Royal Selangor Club, Kuala Lumpur

=== Third place play-off ===
2 June 2012
14:30

| Iran | 52–3 | China |

Royal Selangor Club, Kuala Lumpur

=== Final ===
2 June 2012
16:30

| Thailand | 22–19 | Malaysia |

Royal Selangor Club, Kuala Lumpur

- Thailand promoted to 2013 Division one
- China relegated to 2013 Division three

== Division 3 ==
Key to colours
| Earns Promotion |
| Relegated |

2012 Asian Five Nations division 3
Tournament details
- Host: Indonesia
- Date: 30 May – 1 June 2012
- Countries: 4

Final positions
- Champions: India
- Relegated: Pakistan

Tournament statistics
- Matches played: 4

Semi-finals
May 30, 2012
Guam | 38
Indonesia | 17
May 30, 2012
India | 34
Pakistan | 5

Final
June 1, 2012
Guam | 16
India | 18
Third place play-off
June 1, 2012
Indonesia | 13
Pakistan | 7

=== Semi-finals ===
30 May 2012
14:30

| Guam | 38–17 | Indonesia |
| | Report |

Haji Agus Salim Stadium, Padang

30 May 2012
16:30

| India | 34–5 | Pakistan |
| | Report |

Haji Agus Salim Stadium, Padang

=== Third place play-off ===
1 June 2012
14:30

| Indonesia | 13–7 | Pakistan |
| | Report |

Haji Agus Salim Stadium, Padang

=== Final ===
1 June 2012
16:30

| Guam | 16–18 | India |
| | Report |

Haji Agus Salim Stadium, Padang

- India promoted to 2013 Division two
- Pakistan relegated to 2013 Division four

== Division 4 ==
Key to colours
| Earns Promotion |
| Relegated |

2012 Asian Five Nations division 4
Tournament details
- Host: United Arab Emirates
- Date: 25 – 27 April 2012
- Countries: 4

Final positions
- Champions: Qatar

Tournament statistics
- Matches played: 4

Semi-finals
April 25, 2012
Jordan | 19
Lebanon | 25
April 25, 2012
Qatar | 74
Uzbekistan | 13

Final
April 27, 2012
Lebanon | 0
Qatar | 67
Third place play-off
April 27, 2012
Jordan | 19
Uzbekistan | 15

=== Semi-finals ===
25 April 2012
18:00

| Jordan | 19–25 | Lebanon |
| | Report |

The Sevens Stadium, Dubai
Referee: Chaitanya Sinh (India)

25 April 2012
20:00

| Qatar | 74–13 | Uzbekistan |
| | Report |

The Sevens Stadium, Dubai
Referee: Mohamed Irshad Abdul Cader (Sri Lanka)

=== Third place play-off ===
27 April 2012
15:30

| Jordan | 19–15 | Uzbekistan |

The Sevens Stadium, Dubai

=== Final ===
27 April 2012
17:45

| Lebanon | 0–67 | Qatar |

The Sevens Stadium, Dubai

- Qatar promoted to 2013 Division three

== Division 5 ==
Key to colours
| Earns Promotion |
| Relegated |

2012 Asian Five Nations division 5
Tournament details
- Host: Cambodia
- Date: 26 – 30 June 2012
- Countries: 3

Final positions
- Champions: Laos

Tournament statistics
- Matches played: 3

=== Table ===
| Position | Nation | Games | | | | Points | | | Bonus points | Total points |
| Position | Nation | Played | Won | Lost | Drawn | For | Against | Difference | Bonus points | Total points |
|---|---|---|---|---|---|---|---|---|---|---|
| 1 | Laos | 2 | 2 | 0 | 0 | 128 | 14 | +114 | 2 | 12 |
| 2 | Brunei | 2 | 1 | 1 | 0 | 26 | 85 | −59 | 0 | 5 |
| 3 | Cambodia | 2 | 0 | 2 | 0 | 22 | 77 | −55 | 1 | 1 |

Points are awarded to the teams as follows:

| Results | Points |
|---|---|
| Win | 5 points |
| Draw | 3 points |
| 4 or more tries | 1 point |
| Loss within 7 points | 1 point |
| Loss greater than 7 points | 0 points |

=== Fixtures ===
26 June 2012
15:30

| Cambodia | 15–19 | Brunei |
| | Report |

RCAF Old Stadium, Phnom Penh

28 June 2012
17:30

| Laos | 70–7 | Brunei |
| | Report |

RCAF Old Stadium, Phnom Penh

30 June 2012
15:30

| Cambodia | 7–58 | Laos |
| | Report |

RCAF Old Stadium, Phnom Penh
