= 2014 Asian Five Nations division tournaments =

- Date: 23 April 2014 – 22 June 2014
- Countries: (19) Refer to division

Tournament statistics
- Matches played: 17
- Official website: Website

For main Top 5 Division, see: 2014 Asian Five Nations

The 2014 Asian Five Nations division tournaments, known as the 2014 HSBC Asian 5 Nations for sponsorship reasons, refer to the divisions played within the annual Asian Five Nations rugby union tournament. This is the 7th series of the Asian Five Nations. For the first time since 2010, only four division were used, with a shortened Division 1 due to the change of format in 2015. Division 3 was split into an East and a West conference which like Division 1 was out in place ahead of that format in 2015.

== Changes from 2013 ==
- The United Arab Emiratis participated in the Division 1 tournament, haven been relegated from the Top 5.
- Sri Lanka was promoted to the Top 5 Division, after winning the Division 1 competition in 2013.
- Singapore have replaced Thailand in Division 1, with Thailand competing in Division 2.
- Qatar will compete in Division 2 - replacing India, following promotion from Division 3.
- Lebanon promoted out of Division 4, though no team was demoted out of Division 3.
- With the removal of Division 5, Laos was moved to Division 3, while Brunei, Cambodia and Mongolia forms a new Division 4.

== Teams ==
The teams involved, with their world rankings pre tournament, were:

Division 1

- Chinese Taipei (58)
- Kazakhstan (45)
- Singapore (56)
- United Arab Emirates (97)

Division 2

- Iran (NA)
- Malaysia (71)
- Qatar (NA)
- Thailand (60)

Division 3 East

- China (68)
- Guam (88)
- Indonesia (96)
- Laos (NA)

Division 3 West

- India (74)
- Lebanon (NA)
- Pakistan (76)
- Uzbekistan (96)

Division 4

- Brunei (NA)
- Cambodia (NA)
- Mongolia (NA)

== Division 1 ==
2014 Asian Five Nations division 1
- Date: 23 April – 10 May 2014
- Countries: 2
- Champions: Kazakhstan; Singapore
- Relegated: Chinese Taipei; United Arab Emirates

Tournament statistics
- Matches played: 2

The 2014 Division 1 tournament was held as a single match knock-out format. The participants of the final will remain in Division 1 for the 2015 as the bottom two teams from the 2014 Asian Five Nations tournament will be relegated to Division 1.

=== Fixtures ===
23 April 2014	United Arab Emirates	13–30	Singapore	The Sevens, Dubai, United Arab Emirates
19:30

10 May 2014	Kazakhstan	37–8	Chinese Taipei	Hong Kong Football Club Stadium, Hong Kong
14:30

== Division 2 ==
2014 Asian Five Nations division 2
Tournament details
- Host: Qatar
- Date: 20 – 23 May 2014
- Countries: 4

Final positions
- Champions: Malaysia

Tournament statistics
- Matches played: 4

The 2014 Division II tournament, like the previous tournaments, is being held in a single match knock-out format.

Semi-finals
20 May 2014
Malaysia	43
Iran	22
20 May 2014
Thailand	11
Qatar	24

Final
23 May 2014
Malaysia	31
Qatar	22
Third place play-off
23 May 2014
Iran	26
Thailand	23

=== Semi-finals ===
20 May 2014	Malaysia	43–22	Iran	Al Arabi Stadium, Doha, Qatar
17:30	Try: Mohd Azmir Zanul Abidin (2); Atunaisa Lacadamu Takubu; Wan Izzudin Ismail; Villiame Veto Tuinivanua; Faat Hur Rozi Ismail; Con: Mohd Syarif Saiful Aazwan Sudin (5); Pen: Mohd Syarif Saiful Aazwan Sudin; Cards: Vatimio Rabebe (yellow card)		Try: Hamid-Reza Zareghlaghi (2); Moein Sarkari; Con: Farjam Atshan; Cards: Gholamreza Shahhoseini (yellow card)

20 May 2014	Thailand	11–24	Qatar	Al Arabi Stadium, Doha, Qatar
	Try: Khomchak Chakrabandhu Na Ayudhaya; Pen: Warongkorn Khamkoet (2)		Try: Shane Kelly; Liam Frost; Con: Paul Beard; Pen: Paul Beard (4); Cards: Jamie Frost (yellow card)

=== Third place play-off ===
23 May 2014	Iran	26–23	Thailand	Al Arabi Stadium, Doha, Qatar
17:30	Try: Amin Hoseinzadeh (2); Sajad Izadi; Ahmad Etehadpour; Con: Farjam Atshan (3); Cards: Shahab Balali (yellow card)		Try: Apichai Phichaikamol; Nutanun Thanganun; Topong Limphaiboon; Con: Akarin Thitisakulvit; Pen: Warongkorn Khamkoet (2); Cards: Pongnatee Ngoetong (yellow card)

=== Final ===
23 May 2014	Malaysia	31–22	Qatar	Al Arabi Stadium, Doha, Qatar
19:30	Try: Atunaisa Lacadamu Takubu (2); Wan Izzudin Ismail; Mohd Azmir Zanul Abidin; Con: Faat Hur Rozi Ismail (4); Pen: Faat Hur Rozi Ismail		Try: Aaron Palmer; Con: Paul Beard; Pen: Paul Beard (4); Drop: Paul Beard

== Division 3 ==
The 2014 Division 3 tournament was split into an East and West tournament with both tournaments being held in a single match knock-out format.

=== East ===
2014 Asian Five Nations division 3 East
Tournament details
- Host: Laos
- Date: 29 – 31 May 2014
- Countries: 4

Final positions
- Champions: China

Tournament statistics
- Matches played: 4

Semi-finals
29 May 2014
Indonesia	6
China	10
29 May 2014
Guam	48
Laos	10

Final
31 May 2014
China	41
Guam	10
Third place play-off
31 May 2014
Indonesia	11
Laos	10

==== Semi-finals ====
29 May 2014	Indonesia	6–10	China	Chao Anou Vong Stadium, Vientiane, Laos
16:00	Pen: Justin Field (2)		Try: Xiaoxiang Yu; Weitao Bu

29 May 2014	Guam	48–10	Laos	Chao Anou Vong Stadium, Vientiane, Laos
18:00	Try: Alexander Tenorio (2); Paul Eustaqio; Edward Calvo; Robert J Leon Guerrero; Paul Claros; Christopher Sgro; Arthur Toves; Con: Paul Eustaqio (2); Edward Calvo (2)		Try: Anousith Phaipanya; William Luangrath

==== Third place play-off ====
31 May 2014	Laos	10–11	Indonesia	Chao Anou Vong Stadium, Vientiane, Laos
16:00	Try: Brandon O'Mallan; Randy Mendiola		Try: Yingli Fu (2); Wen Ru Feng; Li Wei Jiang; Bing Ma; Xinjiang Zheng; Wenzhen Li; Con: Jian Hua Wang (2); Wen Ru Feng; Cards: Xin Lian (yellow card)

==== Final ====
29 May 2014	Guam	10–41	China	Chao Anou Vong Stadium, Vientiane, Laos
16:00	Try: William Luangrath; Con: Thitouthone Thirakoun; Pen: Christopher Mastoglio		Try: Reza Bein; Pen: Gareth Rae (2)

=== West ===
2014 Asian Five Nations division 3 West
Tournament details
- Host: Pakistan
- Date: 19 – 22 June 2014
- Countries: 4

Final positions
- Champions: Lebanon

Tournament statistics
- Matches played: 4

Semi-finals
19 June 2014
India	17
Uzbekistan	23
19 June 2014
Lebanon	17
Pakistan	3

Final
22 June 2014
Uzbekistan	19
Lebanon	20
Third place play-off
22 June 2014
India	25
Pakistan	7

==== Semi-finals ====
19 June 2014	India	17–23	Uzbekistan	Punjab Stadium, Lahore, Pakistan
17:00	Try: Nitin Dagar; Vikas Khatri; Neeraj Khatri; Con: Nasser Hussain		Try: Rustam Namirov; Pen: Maxsim Lifontov (6)

19 June 2014	Lebanon	17–3	Pakistan	Punjab Stadium, Lahore, Pakistan
19:00	Try: Mounir Finan; Pen: Karim Jammal		Pen: Kashif Khwaja

==== Third place play-off ====
22 June 2014	India	25–7	Pakistan	Punjab Stadium, Lahore, Pakistan
17:00	Try: Nasser Hussain; Gautam Daga; Rakesh Lochab; Con: Vikas Khatri (2); Pen: Nasser Hussain; Vikas Khatri		Try: Kashif Khwaja; Con: Kashif Khwaja

==== Final ====
22 June 2014	Uzbekistan	19–20	Lebanon	Punjab Stadium, Lahore, Pakistan
19:00	Try: Mosin Evgeniy; Con: Maxsim Lifontov; Pen: Maxsim Lifontov (4)		Try: Joseph Touma; Pen: Karim Jammal (5)

== Division 4 ==
2014 Asian Five Nations division 4
Tournament details
- Host: Brunei
- Date: 17 – 21 June 2014
- Countries: 3

Final positions
- Champions: Mongolia

Tournament statistics
- Matches played: 3

The 2014 Division IV tournament was held as a single round-robin tournament held in Bandar Seri Begawan, Brunei.

Position	Nation	Games				Points			Bonus points	Total points
Position	Nation	Played	Won	Lost	Drawn	For	Against	Difference	Bonus points	Total points
1	Mongolia	2	2	0	0	87	18	69	2	12
2	Cambodia	2	1	1	0	30	69	-39	0	5
3	Brunei	2	0	2	0	33	63	-30	1	1

17 June 2014	Brunei	13–38	Mongolia	Belapan Stadium, Bandar Seri Begawan, Brunei
20:00	Try: Khairi Zuhdi Bin Haji Ramlee; Con: Shen Quan Lim; Pen: Shen Quan Lim (2)		Try: Gansaikhan Enkhbat; Dashdendev Gansukh; Enkamagalan Nyamjar; Nyamsuren Otgonbayar; Khosbayar Ganbold; Mendamar Gansukh; Con: Gansaikhan Enkhbat (4)

19 June 2014	Cambodia	5–49	Mongolia	Belapan Stadium, Bandar Seri Begawan, Brunei
15:45	Try: Ra Rath		Try: Natsagdorj Oidovdorj (2); Zolbayar Batchluun (2); Ochbadrakh Sarantuya; Enkhbat Dashochir; Khucit Nergui; Batmandal Narantsatsral; Gah-Erdene Batdorj; Con: Gansaikhan Enkhbat (2)

21 June 2014	Brunei	20–25	Cambodia	Belapan Stadium, Bandar Seri Begawan, Brunei
20:00	Try: Syafiee Matali; Saffuan Mohammad Ali; Abdul Azim Bin Haji Abu Bakar; Con: Shen Quan Lim; Pen: Ahmad Faez Bin Anuar; Cards: Abdul Azim Bin Haji Abu Bakar (yellow card); Khairi Zuhdi Bin Haji Ramlee (yellow card); Rasimoon Bin Haji Adinin (yellow card)		Try: Vanara Norn; Sovanrado Nong, Nimol Chhil; Con: Ratana Pich (2); Pen: Vanara Norn (2); Cards: Suasdey Chea (yellow card)
