= 2015 Asia Rugby Championship division tournaments =

2015 Asian Rugby Championship division tournaments
- Date: 2015

Tournament statistics

The 2015 Asian Rugby Championship division tournaments refers to the divisions played within the annual Asian Rugby Championship rugby union tournament. The Asian Rugby Championship replaced the Asian Five Nations tournament. The main tournament is now participated by the top three teams in Asia, less teams competing at the 2014 Asian Five Nations, which saw the top five teams in Asia participate. In this edition, Hong Kong, Japan and South Korea participated at the main tournament.

== Teams ==
The teams involved, with their world rankings pre tournament (as of 14 April), were:

Division 1

- Kazakhstan (39)
- Philippines (52)
- Singapore (55)
- Sri Lanka (38)

Division 2

- Chinese Taipei (60)
- Malaysia (61)
- Thailand (65)
- United Arab Emirates (91)

Division 3

East

- China (64)
- Guam (80)
- Indonesia (91)

West

- Iran (NA)
- Jordan (NA)
- Lebanon (NA)

South Central

- India (69)
- Pakistan (79) (withdrew)
- Uzbekistan (88)

Division 4

No tournaments for the Div 4 teams:

- Afghanistan (NA)
- Brunei (NA)
- Cambodia (NA)
- Kyrgyzstan (NA)
- Laos (NA)
- Macau (NA)
- Mongolia (NA)
- Nepal (NA)

== Division 1 ==
2015 Asian Rugby Championship division 1
Tournament details
- Host: Philippines
- Date: 6 – 9 May 2015
- Countries: 4

Final positions
- Champions: Sri Lanka
- Relegated: Singapore

Tournament statistics
- Matches played: 4

Division 1 of the 2015 Asian Rugby Championship was held at the Philippine Sports Stadium in Bocaue, Bulacan from May 6, 2015 to May 9, 2015.

Semi-finals
6 May 2015
Sri Lanka	35
Kazakhstan	14
6 May 2015
Philippines (a.e.t.)	20
Singapore	17

Final
9 May 2015
Sri Lanka	27
Philippines	14
Third place play-off
9 May 2015
Kazakhstan	32
Singapore	12

=== Fixtures ===
==== Semi-finals ====
6 May 2015
14:00 PST (UTC+08)

Sri Lanka	35–14	Kazakhstan

Philippine Sports Stadium, Bocaue

6 May 2015
16:00 PST (UTC+08)

Philippines	20–17 (a.e.t.)	Singapore

Philippine Sports Stadium, Bocaue

==== Third place play-off ====
9 May 2015
16:00 PST (UTC+08)

Kazakhstan	32–12	Singapore

Philippine Sports Stadium, Bocaue

==== Final ====
9 May 2015
18:00 PST (UTC+08)

Philippines	14–27	Sri Lanka

Philippine Sports Stadium, Bocaue

Notes:

Due to financial reasons, the Top 3 Challenge match between Sri Lanka and South Korea scheduled for 6 June 2015 was cancelled. Sri Lanka remained in Division 1 for 2016 and South Korea remained in the Tri-nations division.

== Division 2 ==
2015 Asian Rugby Championship division 2
Tournament details
- Host: Malaysia
- Date: 10 – 16 May 2015
- Countries: 4

Final positions
- Champions: Malaysia
- Relegated: Thailand

Tournament statistics
- Matches played: 6

The Division 2 tournament was held in Kuala Lumpur, Malaysia.

=== Table ===
Pos	Nation	Games				Points			Bonus points	Total points
Pos	Nation	Played	Won	Lost	Drawn	For	Against	Difference	Bonus points	Total points
1	Malaysia	3	3	0	0	119	39	+80	2	17
2	United Arab Emirates	3	2	1	0	88	64	+24	2	12
3	Chinese Taipei	3	1	2	0	64	86	–22	0	6
4	Thailand	3	0	3	0	53	135	–82	1	1
Points were awarded to the teams as follows: Win - 5 points Draw - 3 points 4 or more tries - 1 point Loss within 7 points - 1 point Loss greater than 7 points - 0 points

=== Fixtures ===
==== Round 1 ====
10 May 2015

Thailand	22–53	United Arab Emirates

Petaling Jaya Stadium, Petaling Jaya

10 May 2015

Malaysia	46–13	Chinese Taipei

Petaling Jaya Stadium, Petaling Jaya

==== Round 2 ====
13 May 2015

Chinese Taipei	29–24	Thailand

Petaling Jaya Stadium, Petaling Jaya

13 May 2015

Malaysia	20–19	United Arab Emirates

Petaling Jaya Stadium, Petaling Jaya

==== Round 3 ====
16 May 2015

Chinese Taipei	12–16	United Arab Emirates

Petaling Jaya Stadium, Petaling Jaya

16 May 2015

Malaysia	53–7	Thailand

Petaling Jaya Stadium, Petaling Jaya

== Division 3 East ==
2015 Asian Rugby Championship division 3 East
Tournament details
- Host: Indonesia
- Date: 7 – 13 June 2015
- Countries: 3

Final positions
- Champions: Guam

Tournament statistics
- Matches played: 3

The Division 3 East tournament was held in Jakarta, Indonesia.

=== Table ===
Pos	Nation	Games				Points			Bonus points	Total points
Pos	Nation	Played	Won	Lost	Drawn	For	Against	Difference	Bonus points	Total points
1	Guam	2	2	0	0	51	23	+28	1	11
2	China	2	1	1	0	64	55	+9	1	6
3	Indonesia	2	0	2	0	27	64	–37	0	0
Points were awarded to the teams as follows: Win - 5 points Draw - 3 points 4 or more tries - 1 point Loss within 7 points - 1 point Loss greater than 7 points - 0 points

=== Fixtures ===
==== Round 1 ====
7 June 2015

Indonesia	6–17	Guam

UPH Stadium, Jakarta

==== Round 2 ====
10 June 2015

Guam	34–17	China

UPH Stadium, Jakarta

==== Round 3 ====
13 June 2015

Indonesia	21–47	China

UPH Stadium, Jakarta

== Division 3 West ==
2015 Asian Rugby Championship division 3 West
Tournament details
- Host: Lebanon
- Date: 14 – 18 April 2015
- Countries: 3

Final positions
- Champions: Lebanon

Tournament statistics
- Matches played: 3

The Division 3 West tournament was held in Jounieh, Lebanon.

=== Table ===
Pos	Nation	Games				Points			Bonus points	Total points
Pos	Nation	Played	Won	Lost	Drawn	For	Against	Difference	Bonus points	Total points
1	Lebanon	2	2	0	0	98	11	+87	1	11
2	Iran	2	1	1	0	57	30	+27	1	6
3	Jordan	2	0	2	0	6	120	–114	0	0
Points were awarded to the teams as follows: Win - 5 points Draw - 3 points 4 or more tries - 1 point Loss within 7 points - 1 point Loss greater than 7 points - 0 points

=== Fixtures ===
==== Round 1 ====
14 April 2015	Lebanon	71–3	Jordan	Fouad Shehab Stadium, Jounieh, Lebanon
19:30 EEST (UTC+03)	Try: Karim Jammal; Firas al-Chami (2); Mohammad Turk; Mounir Finan; Georges Cassab; Jean Rmeily; Steve Pere; Sam Jarouche; Con: Karim Jammal (7); Pen: Karim Jammal (4)		Pen: Yoldar Sober

==== Round 2 ====
16 April 2015	Iran	49–3	Jordan	Fouad Shehab Stadium, Jounieh
17:30 EEST (UTC+03)	Try: Amin Hoseinzadeh (3); Shahram Sharifi; Masour Majhali Firouzi; Meysam Khademardekani; Sina Khanzadehmohtashami; Reza Bayat; Con: Masour Majhali Firouzi; Sajjad Izadi; Ramin Norisadi; Pen: Shahram Sharifi; Cards: Sina Khanzadehmohtashami (yellow card)		Pen: Yaldar Sober

==== Round 3 ====
18 April 2015	Lebanon	27–8	Iran	Fouad Shehab Stadium, Jounieh
17:30 EEST (UTC+03)	Try: Arshia Mottaghinejad; Pen: Amin Hoseinzadeh; Cards: Meysam Khademardekani (yellow card); Omid Mostafa (yellow card)		Try: Karim Jammal, Jad al-Hachem; Con: Karim Jammal; Pen: Karim Jammal (4); Thomas Saliba; Cards: Jean Rmeily (yellow card)

== Division 3 Central ==
2015 Asian Rugby Championship division 3 Central
Tournament details
- Host: Uzbekistan
- Date: 24 – 30 May 2015
- Countries: 3

Final positions
- Champions: India

Tournament statistics
- Matches played: 2

The Division 3 Central tournament will be held in Tashkent, Uzbekistan. Pakistan were scheduled to participate, but had to withdraw due to financial concerns. The tournament was reduced to India and Uzbekistan playing two tests to decide the winner of Division 3 Central.

=== Table ===
Pos	Nation	Games				Points			Bonus points	Total points
Pos	Nation	Played	Won	Lost	Drawn	For	Against	Difference	Bonus points	Total points
1	India	2	1	1	0	46	40	6	0	6
2	Uzbekistan	2	1	1	0	40	46	-6	0	5
Points were awarded to the teams as follows: Win - 5 points Draw - 3 points 4 or more tries - 1 point Loss within 7 points - 1 point Loss greater than 7 points - 0 points

=== Fixtures ===
==== Round 1 ====
27 May 2015
17:00 UZT (UTC+05)

India	31–8	Uzbekistan
Try: Vikas Khatri 2, Rakesh Lochab; Con: Sujai Lama 2 Pen: Sujai Lama 4		Try: Abduvoris Karimov; Pen: Maxsim Lifontov

Dustlik, Tashkent, Uzbekistan

==== Round 2 ====
30 May 2015
17:00 UZT (UTC+05)

Uzbekistan	32–15	India

Dustlik, Tashkent
