= Dicky Natapradja =

- Born: March 29, 1977 (age 49) Bandung, Indonesia
- Height: 5 ft 8 in (1.73 m)
- Weight: 108 kg (238 lb; 17.0 st)
- University: University of Technology, Sydney

Rugby union career
- Position: Prop
International career
Years	Team	Apps	(Points)
2007–2015	Indonesia	14	(0)
Coaching career
- Years: Team
- 2019–: Indonesia

Dicky (Bobby) Natapradja, known as Bobby Orlando, (born 29 March 1977) is a former Indonesian rugby union player who played for the Indonesian National Rugby team, also known as the "Rhinos". Between 2007 and 2015, he played prop in 14 international matches, four as captain, for Indonesia. He has played for Jakarta Banteng Rugby Club, Jago Dulu Rugby Jakarta.

Originally from Bandung, Indonesia, Natapradja was raised in Sydney, Australia, where he graduated from St Marys Senior High School in 1994 and grew up playing both rugby union and league. He attended the University of Technology, Sydney.

== International rugby career ==
Natapradja made his Rhino debut on 15 July 2008, on the Indonesian squad that would play Laos in the 2008 Asian Five Nations tournament held in Jakarta. The historic 23-11 win would mark Indonesia's first win on home soil and also Natapradja's first win as captain. The following week, he would again lead the Rhino squad in their 55-3 win over Cambodia to win the tournament.

Natapradja was again named to the 42 man Indonesian training squad in preparation to the 2009 A5N tournament became the starting tight head prop for that series. Indonesia would ultimately lose matches against Guam and Iran, finishing in last place. He would go on to play four more matches for the Rhinos in 2010 and 2011, and named captain for the 2011 A5N tournament in which Indonesia beat Pakistan in a battle for third place.

In 2011, Natapradja retired from international rugby to take a post as Chairman for the Persatuan Rugby Union Indonesia, the governing body of Indonesian rugby, but came out of retirement two years later to once again represent his country in the 2014 A5N tournament in Laos, and again in the 2015 Asian Championship hosted in Jakarta, Indonesia.

=== Coaching ===
In 2019 Natapradja was named head coach of the Indonesian national team.
