= Indonesia national rugby union team =

Indonesia
- Nickname: The Rhinos
- Emblem: Javan rhinoceros
- Union: Indonesian Rugby Union Federation
- Head coach: Vacant
- Captain: Daniel Nugroho
- Most caps: Daniel Nugroho (21)
- Top scorer: Kirk Arundale (107)
- Home stadium: Gelora Bung Karno Sports Complex
First colours	Second colours

World Rugby ranking
- Current: 109 (as of 31 July 2024)
- Highest: 97 (2014)
- Lowest: 109 (2024)

First international
- Cambodia 30–12 Indonesia (Phnom Penh, Cambodia; June 27, 2006)

Biggest win
- Indonesia 55–3 Cambodia (Jakarta, Indonesia; June 19, 2008)

Biggest defeat
- Indonesia 10–63 China (Jakarta, Indonesia; June 23, 2019)

World Cup
- Appearances: none
- Website: rugbyindonesia.or.id

The Indonesia national rugby union team represents Indonesia in rugby union. They are nicknamed the "Rhinos". The team is a full member of World Rugby. They have yet to play in the Rugby World Cup. The Indonesian squad was formed in 2006 to attend the IRB sanctioned Six Division Asian Rugby Football Tournament between Brunei, Laos, Cambodia and Indonesia. They currently compete in Division 3 South-East in the Asian Rugby Football Union.

The national side is ranked 109th in the world (as of 31 July 2024).

== History ==
=== Early years (1975-1986) ===
Rugby was first introduced in Indonesia during the Dutch colonial period. In March 1976, an Indonesian Sevens squad, alongside twelve other nations, participated in the inaugural Hong Kong Sevens tournament. Indonesia returned to Hong Kong again for the 1976 tournament where they lost to Tonga in the plate final. Indonesia continued to participate in the tournament until 1986, after which interest began to wane.

=== ARFU Division 6 (2004-2008) ===
In the early to mid 2000s, rugby made a resurgence in Indonesia. In 2004, the Indonesian Rugby Football Union was formed and on 27 June 2006 the first ever Indonesian XVs game was played against Cambodia during the first Division 6 ARFU regional tournament in Phnom Penh, Cambodia. Indonesia would lose their début test match 30-7. In 2007, Singapore rugby's Ismail Kadir and Justin Sampson took over coaching duties. Later that year, the Rhinos returned once again to the Asian Division 6 Championships in Brunei, recording wins against Laos 17-3 and Cambodia 11-10. Indonesia then went on to defeat tournament hosts Brunei 28-13, taking home the series as well as the Darussalam Cup.

In July 2008, the Rhinos won the HSBC a5n Regional Tournament, which was played at the Universitas Pelita Harapan, Jakarta, Indonesia. The Rhinos defeated Laos 23-11 and Cambodia 55-3 in front of an appreciative home crowd. The Rhinos finished their time in ARFU Division 6 with an impressive 88% Win–loss record (7 wins, 1 loss), thus earning a promotion Division 3.

=== ARFU Division 3 (2009- present) ===
In 2009, Indonesia's coaching staff of Kadir and Sampson was expanded to include former Wallabies player Duncan Hall, who had previously held the head coaching job for the USA national team. In July 2009, Indonesia made their debut in Division 3 at the 2009 Asian Five Nations. In the tournament, the Rhinos recorded two consecutive losses, falling 3-23 to Guam and 13-48 to Iran.

In the years that followed, Indonesia would lose three more matches in the upper tier division before finally posting their first win on 25 June 2011 against Pakistan 20-19 during the 2011 A5N divisional series in Jakarta. Following that win, Indonesia went on to win two of its next four matches, including a thumping win over China 37-13 in Malaysia in 2014. A year later, the Rhinos would face China a second time in the 2014 A5n opener, losing a highly contested match by a four-point differential. Two days later, an 11-10 win against Laos would secure a third-place finish in the series.

In 2015, the rebranded Asia Rugby Championship returned once again to Jakarta where Indonesia faced Guam in the series opener. This would mark Indonesia's first match at home since they defeated Pakistan three years prior. The Rhinos would go winless in the series, first losing the opener to Guam and later China. In 2016 Indonesia would play just one test match against Loas, losing by a large margin, 12-48.

In 2019, the IRFU named former Rhinos veteran and captain Dicky Natapradja as head coach for the 2019 Asia Rugby Championship series where Indonesia competed in the newly formed Division 3 South-East division along with India and China. On June 23, Indonesia fell in the tournament opener to a strong Chinese side 63—10, with the Rhino's lone try coming from veteran captain Daniel Nugroho.

== Current squad ==
2019 Asia Rugby Championships roster

Player	Position	Date of birth (age)	Caps	Club/province
Nugroho, Daniel R. (c)	Prop	21 February 1989 (age 37)	21	Jakarta Komodos
Sebastian, Marco	Hooker	9 May 1985 (age 41)	9	Bandung Rams
Joku, Niko	Prop	3 November 1982 (age 43)	18	
Oyaitou, Lawrence	Lock	28 November 1995 (age 30)	1	Jayapura, Papua
Al Akbar, Brilyan	Lock	16 August 1994 (age 31)	1	
Bainivanua, Leone	Flanker	14 September 1982 (age 43)	1	Jakarta Banteng
Hendharto, Richard	Flanker	7 April 2001 (age 25)	2	Richmond F.C.
Pello, Kareem	Number 8	28 November 2000 (age 25)	0	Jakarta Banteng
Pramono, Ari Yudha	Scrum-half	6 January 1994 (age 32)	9	Jakarta Banteng
Atkinson, Ian S.	Fly-half	17 November 1992 (age 33)	2	Bali Rugby
Oyaitouw, Septinus	Wing	1 May 1990 (age 36)	1	Universitas Negeri Jakarta Rugby
Williams, Glen	Centre	18 January 1999 (age 27)	1	CSM Rugby
Gumilang, Andre	Centre	3 March 1996 (age 30)	0	Universitas Negeri Jakarta Rugby
Prahastano, Mirza	Wing	28 November 1998 (age 27)	9	Jakarta Banteng
Field, Stephen	Fullback	28 October 1994 (age 31)	7	
Buinei, Toberi	Hooker	16 November 1990 (age 35)	1	
Prakoso, Leonardo	Prop	18 August 1997 (age 28)	1	
Ardianto, Mohamad Yusuf	Prop	28 November 1997 (age 28)	1	
Ariobimo, Iman	Lock	28 August 1997 (age 28)	1	
Rahadiansyah, Dias	Flanker	6 October 1991 (age 34)	1	Universitas Negeri Jakarta Rugby
Uran Mema, Yohanes Musi	Scrum-half	10 August 1991 (age 34)	1	Jakarta Banteng
Faulkes, Todd	Centre	26 August 1992 (age 33)	0	
Bangim, Raphael	Centre	10 May 1994 (age 32)	1	
Rifaldi, Muhammad	Centre	25 December 1995 (age 30)	1	Universitas Negeri Jakarta Rugby
Triawan, Agus	Centre	9 August 1994 (age 31)	1	Universitas Negeri Jakarta Rugby
Carli, Maykel	Scrum-half	13 November 1995 (age 30)	1	Jakarta Banteng

== Coaches and captaincy ==
=== Current coaching staff ===
Position	Name
Head coach	Vacant
Assistant coach	
Backs coach	
Forwards coach	

=== Previous head coaches ===
Indonesia coaches by date, matches and win percentage
Coach	Period	G	W	L	D	%
(France) Nico de Ribas	2006	3	2	1	0	66.67
(Singapore) Ismail Kadir	2007–2009	7	5	2	0	71.43
(Australia) Duncan Hall	2010–2011	4	1	3	0	25.00
(United Kingdom) Jamie Johnston	2012–2013	4	2	2	0	50.00
(United Kingdom) Simon Jones	2014–2015	4	1	3	0	25.00
(South Africa) J. P. Koen	2016	1	0	1	0	0.00
(Indonesia) Bobby Orlando	2019–2021	2	0	2	0	0.00
Total (2006–present)		25	11	14	0	44.00
Updated as of 30 June 2019

=== Team Captains ===
Year(s)	Name
2006	(Indonesia) Nelson Joku
2007	(Indonesia) Fikri Al-Azhar
2008	(Indonesia) Bobby Orlando
2009–2010	(England) Kirk Arundale
2011	(Indonesia) Bobby Orlando
2012–2015	(Indonesia) Daniel Nugroho
2016	(Australia) Stephen Field
2019–	(Indonesia) Daniel Nugroho
Updated as of 26 June 2019

== Records ==
=== Asian Rugby Championship record ===
Year	Division	Result	P	W	L	D	W-L%	PF	PA	PD	Notes
2006	Regional	2nd	3	2	1	0	66.67	73	60	+13	
2007	Regional	1st	3	3	0	0	100.00	56	28	+28	
2008	South-East	1st	2	2	0	0	100.00	78	17	+64	promotion
2009	Division 3	4th	2	0	2	0	0.00	13	71	-58	
2010	Division 3	4th	2	0	2	0	0.00	23	62	-39	
2011	Division 3	3rd	2	1	1	0	50.00	43	51	-8	
2012	Division 3	3rd	2	1	1	0	50.00	30	45	-15	
2013	Division 3	3rd	2	1	1	0	50.00	52	46	+6	
2014	Division 3 East	3rd	2	1	1	0	50.00	17	20	-3	
2015	Division 3 East	4th	2	0	2	0	0.00	27	64	-37	
2016	Division 3 East	2nd	1	0	1	0	0.00	12	48	-36	
2017	Division 3 East	-	-	-	-	-	-	-	-	-	DNP
2018	Division 3 East	-	-	-	-	-	-	-	-	-	DNP
2019	Division 3 South-East	4th	2	0	2	0	0.00	22	105	-83	
Total			25	11	14	0	44.00	443	617	-224	–
Updated as of: 30 June 2019

=== Overall Test record by opponent ===
Below is a table of the representative rugby matches played by an Indonesia national XV at test level up until 29 June 2019, updated after match with India.

Opponent	Played	Won	Lost	Drawn	% Won	PF	PA	PD
Brunei	2	0	2	0	0%	65	34	+31
Cambodia	3	2	1	0	66.67%	73	43	+30
China	5	1	4	0	20%	97	165	-68
Guam	5	0	5	0	0%	54	160	-106
India	1	0	1	0	0%	12	42	-30
Iran	1	0	1	0	0%	13	48	-35
Laos	4	4	0	0	100%	85	36	+49
Pakistan	3	2	1	0	66.67%	44	39	+5
Total	25	11	14	0	44%	443	567	-124

== See also ==
- Rugby union in Indonesia
- Indonesia national rugby sevens team
