= India national rugby union team =

Indian national men's rugby team

India
- Union: Rugby India
- Head coach: Waisale Serevi
- Captain: Vikas Khatri
First colours	Second colours

World Rugby ranking
- Current: 86 (as of August 2025)

First international
- Singapore 85–0 India (26 October 1998)

Biggest win
- India 92–0 Pakistan (14 June 2008)

Biggest defeat
- Singapore 85–0 India (26 October 1998)

The India national rugby union team is the national team representing Indian men in the international rugby championships. The team is governed by Rugby India and recognised by World Rugby.

== History ==
Rugby union in India dates back to a scratch match or two played in Calcutta and Madras during the visit of MS Galatea in 1871. The first recorded match was played on Christmas Day 1872, at CFC in Kolkata, it was played between England and a combined team of Scotland, Ireland and Wales.

The national team was not started until 1998 however when the India national team played Singapore in Singapore, they lost 85–0. The team were then admitted into the International Rugby Board in 2001 and then in 2003 the team undertook its first UK tour. This consisted of playing three sides from the Midlands which all resulted in large defeats, including a staggering 153–0 defeat from a Leicester Tigers XV at Welford Road. They also failed to score a single try during their visit. Despite the sheer lack of success, the head did have some positive words, stating: "It's all a learning process for us. The difference in size and body weight between the two teams was huge, but when we get back to Asia we'll be playing against teams roughly our own size." In 2007 India attempted to qualify for the 2007 Rugby World Cup in France, Scotland, and Wales. They were placed in Asian Division 3, Pool B for the qualifiers in which India finished second of four teams with 1 win, 1 tie, and 1 loss. As only the first place team moved on to the second qualification round India was officially knocked out of the 2007 World Cup.

In 2005, they started their attempt to qualify for the 2007 Rugby World Cup, but a 22–36 loss to Kazakhstan sent them out of the running for that tournament. They also were disappointed with an 8–8 tie in Guam, but still managed to finish second in their group of four teams thanks to beating Malaysia 48–12. However, as only the top team in the group qualified for the next stage, India were out.

In 2008 the India Rugby Union Team attempted to qualify for the Rugby World Cup again. This time though qualification was different as instead of the group stage India had to play in the 2008 Asian Five Nations and win it in order to move on to Round 2 in qualification. India though lost their first match against Thailand and had to settle for 3rd place after a 2nd place match win against Pakistan in which India achieved their biggest ever victory as they beat Pakistan 92–0.

In 2019, South Africa legend and former South Africa national rugby union team player Naas Botha became the head coach of Indian men's and women's national teams. Under his supervision Rugby India held practice sessions, tryouts in different part of the India. As per Botha, India have to play at least 10-12 matches per year per season. India have 1.3 billion people, the country can form a competitive national team. 800 schools in the country have rugby 7 teams, these schools also have to make 15 players teams, It will increase talent pool. Even if 50-100 started their 15 player side.

== Stadium ==
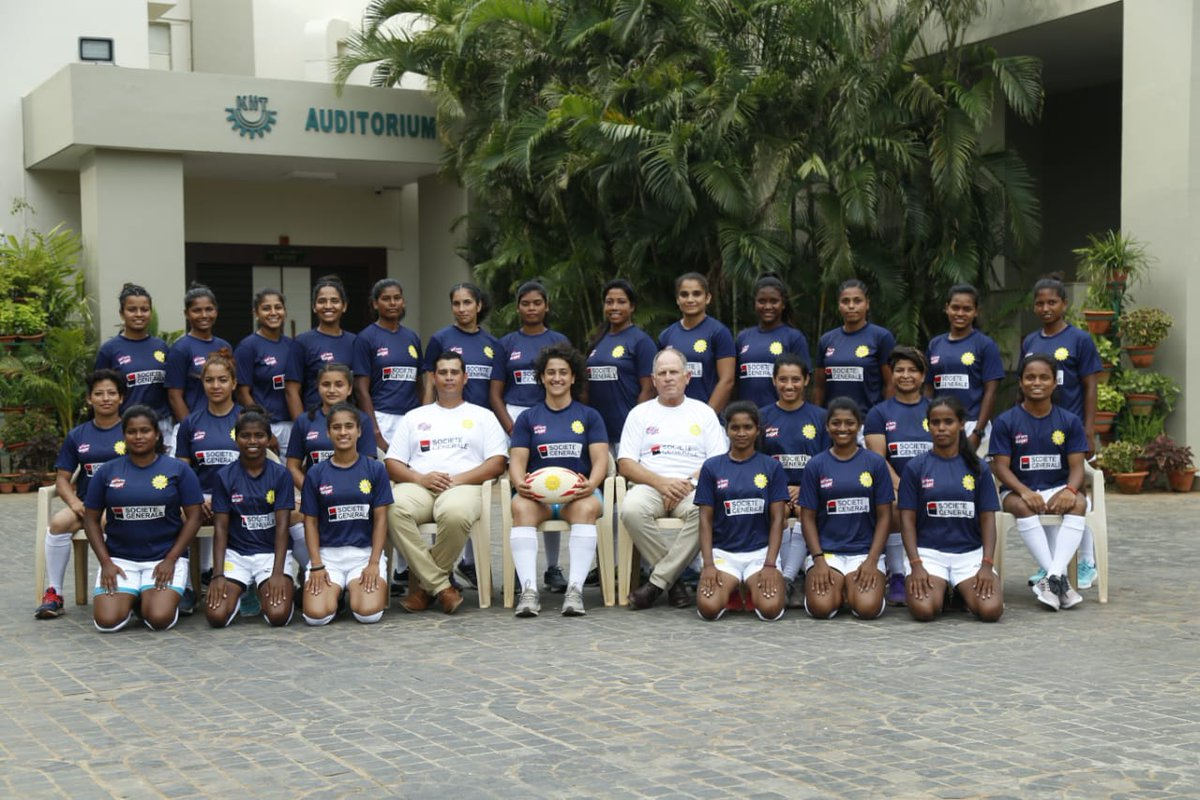
Rugby players from Odisha

India does not have its own personal stadium to use. When they play they usually do on local university fields throughout India.

== Strip ==
India have worn dark blue and black for all of their Rugby Union games since 2011 and prior to that, from 1998 to 2010, they used the traditional Indian sports colours of light blue and white. At present, the shirt and socks are dark blue and the shorts are black.

== Record ==
=== World Cup ===
India has never played in the Rugby World Cup but they have attempted to qualify a number of times.

Year	Host	Qualification	Record (W–L–D)	Finish	Results
1987 to 1995	Various	Did not exist			
1999	Various	Asian Qualifiers	–	Did not participate	
2003	Various	Asian Qualifiers	–	Did not participate	
2007	Various	Asian Qualifiers	1–1–1	2nd in Round 1 Division 3	Did not qualify
2011	Thailand	Asian Qualifiers	1–1–0	3rd in Round 1	Did not qualify
2015	Various	Asian Qualifiers	2–1–0	2nd in Division 2/3 promotion	Did not qualify
2019	Various	Asian Qualifiers	–	Did not participate	
2023	Various	Asian Qualifiers	–	Not eligible for main tournament	Did not qualify
2027	Sri Lanka	Asian Qualifiers	0–2–0	4th in Division 1	Did not qualify

=== Asia Rugby Championship ===
India competes annually in the Asia Rugby Championship, which is a rugby union competition held amongst national rugby sides within the Asia Rugby region. India participated in the inaugural 2008 Asian Five Nations (as it was then known) competing in the Second Division, finishing in third place, and missing out on being promoted. During the 2009 Asian Five Nations India again finished in 3rd place in the Second Division but then during the 2010 Asian Five Nations India just lost out on promotion to Division 1 when they were beaten 34–12 by the Philippines in the final game. They then suffered a setback in 2011 Asian Five Nations as they were relegated to Division 3 after losing both their matches in Second Division tournament. In 2012 India were successful in winning the Third Division tournament earning a promotion back to Division 2 the following year. In 2013 they finished fourth in the Second Division tournament, relegating them back to the third division. In 2014 the Division 3 tournament was split into an East and West competition, with four teams in each. India finished in fourth place in the Division 3 West tournament. In 2015 the Division 3 tournament was split into three brackets, East, West and Central, with three teams in each. India competed in the Central tournament, however due to the withdrawal of Pakistan the remaining teams India and Uzbekistan played two matches against each other. As both team scored respective victories India was declared the winner on points difference. In 2016 the Division 3 tournament was split into four competitions, East, Central, West and West-Central. India plays in the South-Central bracket where it is scheduled to compete against Pakistan.

Year	Host	Division Champion	India Record (W–L)	India Finish
1998	Singapore	Singapore	0–3	6th Place in Division 2
2002	Thailand	Thailand	0–3	7th Place in Division 2
2004	Hong Kong	China	1–1	3rd Place in Division 3
2007	Sri Lanka	Iran	1–1	2nd Place in Division 3
2008	Thailand	Thailand	1–1	3rd Place in Division 2
2009	Malaysia	Malaysia	1–1	3rd Place in Division 2
2010	India	Philippines	1–1	2nd Place in Division 2
2011	Thailand	Chinese Taipei	0–2	4th Place in Division 2
2012	Indonesia	India	2–0	1st Place in Division 3
2013	Malaysia	Singapore	0–2	4th Place in Division 2
2014	Pakistan	Lebanon	1–1	3rd Place in Division 3 West
2015	Uzbekistan	India	1–1	1st Place in Division 3 Central
2017	Chinese Taipei	Singapore	0–2	4th Place in Division 2
2018	Thailand	Chinese Taipei	0–2	3rd Place in Division 2
2019	Indonesia	China	1–1	2nd Place in Division 3 East-South
2022	India	India	2–0	1st Place in Division 3 South
2023	Qatar	Qatar	0–2	3rd Place in Division 2
2024	Sri Lanka	Sri Lanka	0–2	4th Place in Division 1

=== Overall records ===
Below is a table of the representative rugby matches played by an India national XV at test level up until 4 May 2024, updated after match with Qatar.

Opponent	Played	Won	Lost	Drawn	% Won
Arabian Gulf	1	0	1	0	0%
Bangladesh	1	1	0	0	100%
China	4	1	3	0	25%
Chinese Taipei	3	0	3	0	0%
Guam	3	2	0	1	66.67%
Indonesia	1	1	0	0	100%
Iran	3	0	3	0	0%
Kazakhstan	4	0	4	0	0%
Malaysia	4	1	3	0	25%
Nepal	1	1	0	0	100%
Pakistan	7	7	0	0	100%
Philippines	2	1	1	0	50%
Qatar	2	0	2	0	0%
Singapore	4	0	4	0	0%
Sri Lanka	3	0	3	0	0%
Thailand	8	0	8	0	0%
Uzbekistan	3	1	2	0	33.33%
Total	54	16	37	1	29.63%

== Squad ==
The squad selected for 2024 Asia Rugby Championship Division 1.

No.	Player	Club
1	Sanket Patil	Bombay Gymkhana
2	Vallabh Patil	Bombay Gymkhana
3	Suraj Prasad	CCFC
4	Harvinder Singh	CCFC
5	Devendra Padir	CCFC
6	Bhupinder Singh	CCFC
7	Hitesh Dagar (vc)	Delhi Hurricanes
8	Javed Hussain	Delhi Hurricanes
9	Shivam Shukla	Delhi Hurricanes
10	Bhupendra Bokan	Delhi Hurricanes
11	Deepak Punia (c)	Delhi Hurricanes
12	Mohit Khatri	Delhi Hurricanes
13	Neeraj Khatri	Delhi Hurricanes
14	Prince Khatri	Delhi Hurricanes
15	Bharat Dagar	Delhi Hurricanes
16	Mannu Tanwar	Delhi Hurricanes
17	Pradeep Tanwar	Delhi Hurricanes
18	Joginder	Delhi Hurricanes
19	Abhishek Shukla	Delhi Hurricanes
20	Prabal Giri	Delhi Rebels
21	Sukumar Hembrom	FH Harlequins
22	Rajdeep Saha	FH Harlequins
23	Sakti Nag	FH Harlequins
24	Asis Sabar	KISS
25	Ajit Hansdah	KISS
26	Suresh Kumar	Services

== See also ==
- History of rugby union
- Sport in India
- Rugby union in India
