= Rugby union in Indonesia =

- Country: Indonesia
- Governing body: Indonesia Rugby Football Union
- National team: Indonesia
- Clubs: 12

National competitions
- Rugby World Cup; Rugby World Cup Sevens; IRB Sevens World Series; Asian Five Nations

Rugby union in Indonesia is a minor but growing sport, dating back several decades, and which has experienced fluctuations in its success. There are currently just under six hundred registered players in the country.

== Governing body ==
The governing body is the Indonesian Rugby Football Union which is a member of World Rugby, and Asian Rugby Football Union.

== History ==
Rugby was first introduced into the Dutch East Indies, during the colonial period.

In 1983, it was recorded that there were four rugby clubs in the country, namely the International Sports Club (consisting of businessmen) based in Jakarta, another based in Kalimantan (mostly of French origin), another based at Bandung (with a 15 ft rise between the touchlines), and the fourth, bizarrely was based on a United States Navy vessel, and its home games were played there. Many of Indonesia's rugby pitches still have unusual distinctions – one is in the heart of the Indonesian jungle, another on a mountain summit, and another in the middle of a tea plantation.

Supposedly the game died out in 1986, after Indonesia had participated in Hong Kong Sevens. However, with the help of a group of Australian, New Zealand and Welsh expats, along with local Indonesians, Malaysians and Singaporeans, the game was revived in 2004.

Although traditionally seen as the province of Commonwealth expatriates, the game has made strides amongst the native population.

As with many other minor rugby nations, the sport is mainly played in and around the capital Jakarta. It is often staged by various multisport clubs. Among the more prominent Jakarta-based clubs are the Jakarta Komodos Rugby Club and the Jakarta Banteng R.F.U. At least before 2012, the former players of Jakarta Banteng from the surrounding megapolitan then established a new club called Bogor Rusa Rugby Club with the training bases formerly in Pajajaran field in Tanah Sareal then moved to army's football field of Cimandala, Regency Northern Bogor/Kabupaten Bogor Utara after 2024. A club in Bandung i.e. Bandung Rams was established since 2004 and still growing to this day despite the inability of some clubs due to COVID-19 i.e. Team KBB in Cilame, West Bandung. Several clubs emerged from Universities i.e. U.N.J. in East Jakarta, U.P.I. in Sumedang, or U.N.Y. in Sleman.

Today there is an Indonesia national rugby union team and a somewhat successful sevens team, and the game is somewhat more developed, but remains minor. There is also an ongoing schools programme called Get Into Rugby (G.I.R).
