= Rugby union in Laos =

Rugby union in Laos is a minor but growing sport.

== Governing body ==
The governing body is the Lao Rugby Federation, which was founded in 2001.

== History ==
Rugby was originally introduced when Laos was part of French Indochina, but this was mainly by French expatriates. After independence there was a long hiatus, as financial and political forces, from famine to the Vietnam War meant it was impossible for the game to be played.

The Indochinese Cup was established in 1999, as a four sided tourname between Vietnamese teams from Saïgon and Hanoi, Vientiane (Laos) and Phnom Penh in Cambodia.

Laos takes part in the South East Asia region of the Asian Five Nations

== See also ==
- Laos national rugby union team
