= 2012 Asian Five Nations =

- Date: 27 April – 26 May 2012
- Countries: Hong Kong; Japan; Kazakhstan; South Korea; United Arab Emirates

Final positions
- Champions: Japan (20th title)

Tournament statistics
- Matches played: 10
- Top scorer(s): (Japan) Ayumu Goromaru (62)
- Most tries: (Japan) Yoshikazu Fujita (6)
- Website: www.asian5nations.com

The 2012 Asian Five Nations, known as the 2012 HSBC Asian 5 Nations due to the tournament's sponsorship by the HSBC, was the 5th series of the Asian Five Nations rugby union tournament.

Japan secured their 5th Asian Five Nations title, 20th overall Asian title, winning all four of their games.

== Changes from 2011 ==
- Sri Lanka has been replaced with South Korea, who earns promotion from Division 1.

== Teams ==
The teams involved are:

Nation	Home stadium	City	Head coach	Captain
Hong Kong (26)	Hong Kong Football Club Stadium; Mong Kok Stadium	Hong Kong	(Wales) Dai Rees	
Japan (14)	Level-5 Stadium; Chichibunomiya Rugby Stadium	Fukuoka; Tokyo	(Australia) Eddie Jones	Toshiaki Hirose
Kazakhstan (30)	Almaty Central Stadium; National University Stadium	Almaty	(Kazakhstan) Valery Popov	
South Korea (31)	Seongnam Stadium	Seoul	(South Korea) Seo Chun-Oh	
United Arab Emirates (NR)	Jebel Ali Center of Excellence; The Sevens	Dubai	(Australia) Duncan Hall	(United Kingdom) Alistair Thompson

== Final Table ==
2012 Asian Five Nations Champion
Relegated to Division One

Rank	Nation	Games				Points			Bonus points	Total points
Rank	Nation	Played	Won	Lost	Drawn	For	Against	Diff	Bonus points	Total points
1	Japan	4	4	0	0	312	11	301	4	24
2	South Korea	4	3	1	0	163	109	54	2	17
3	Hong Kong	4	2	2	0	159	98	61	3	13
4	United Arab Emirates	4	1	3	0	80	269	-189	1	6
5	Kazakhstan	4	0	4	0	48	275	-227	1	1

Points are awarded to the teams as follows:

Results	Points
Win	5 points
Draw	3 points
4 or more tries	1 point
Loss within 7 points	1 point
Loss greater than 7 points	0 points

== Fixtures ==
27 April 2012
20:00

United Arab Emirates	10–85	Hong Kong
Try: Thompson		Try: Varty (4); Maclay (3); McQueen (2); Robertson; Kam Shing; Hewson; Jones; Hussey; Con: Robertson (3); McQueen; Hood (2); Pen: Robertson (1)

The Sevens, Dubai

28 April 2012
15:00

Kazakhstan	0–87	Japan
		Try: Tamura 1' c Ono 13' c Goromaru (2) 21' c, 49' c Onozawa (3) 33' c, 58' c, 64' c Semba 40' c Hatakeyama 41' c Fujii 60' m Sasaki 67' c Hirose 71' m Nagatomo 80' c Con: Goromaru (11/13)

Almaty Central Stadium, Almaty
Attendance: 3,400
Referee: (Singapore) Harry Mason

5 May 2012
16:00

Hong Kong	19–21	South Korea
		Try: Nam-Wook (2); Noh-Woon; Con: Oh Youn-Hyung (2/2) Kim Won-Yong (1/1)

Hong Kong Football Club Stadium, Hong Kong

5 May 2012
18:00

Japan	106–3	United Arab Emirates
Try: Tatekawa 5'; Fujita (6) 11', 50', 58', 61', 69', 71'; Goromaru (2) 18', 21'; Mochizuki 25'; Semba 32'; Kuwazuru (2) 46', 74'; H, Ono 55'; Morikawa 65'; Kizu 84'; Con: Goromaru (10/11); Tatekawa (4/5)	Report	Pen: Strang (1/2)

Level-5 Stadium, Fukuoka
Referee: (Singapore) Harry Mason

11 May 2012
18:00

United Arab Emirates	46–31	Kazakhstan

Jebel Ali Center of Excellence, Dubai

12 May 2012
13:00

South Korea	8–52	Japan
Try: Sung Min; Con: Hong Sik (0/1); Pen: Hong Sik (1/1)	Report	Try: Onozawa (3); Makabe; Mochizuki; Hirose; Sasaki (2); Con: Goromaru (6/8)

Seongnam Stadium, Seoul

19 May 2012
14:00

Japan	67–0	Hong Kong

Chichibunomiya Rugby Stadium, Tokyo

19 May 2012
15:00

Kazakhstan	17–87	South Korea

National University Stadium, Almaty

26 May 2012
13:00

South Korea	47–21	United Arab Emirates

Seongnam Stadium, Seoul

26 May 2012
16:00

Hong Kong	55–0	Kazakhstan

Mong Kok Stadium, Hong Kong

== See also ==
- 2012 Asian Five Nations division tournaments
