= United Arab Emirates national rugby union team =

United Arab Emirates
- Union: United Arab Emirates Rugby Federation
- Head coach: Jacques Benade
- Captain: Matthew Mills
- Home stadium: 7he Sevens

World Rugby ranking
- Current: 39 (as of 21 July 2025)
- Highest: 39 (2025)
- Lowest: 97 (2013)

First international
- Sri Lanka 13–13 UAE (23 April 2011)

Biggest win
- Pakistan 0–95 UAE (4 July 2023)

Biggest defeat
- UAE 0–111 Japan (13 May 2011)

World Cup
- Appearances: 0
- Website: uaerugby.ae

The United Arab Emirates national rugby union team represents the United Arab Emirates in rugby union and is governed by the United Arab Emirates Rugby Federation. They were once part of the Arabian Gulf team which consisted of players from the Gulf Cooperation Countries on the Arabian Peninsula, but the team disbanded in 2010 following a reorganization of rugby in the region by the International Rugby Board (now World Rugby).

The United Arab Emirates Rugby Federation became the first union formed following the disbantion of the Arabian Gulf team, and in 2011, they were granted membership into the Asian Rugby Football Union (now Asia Rugby) and, following a successful bid, were granted full membership in World Rugby in November 2012.

== History ==
=== Early Roots ===
Long term historical background shows that rugby's beginnings in the middle east, on the desert sand pitches for which it is famed, stretch as far back to the mid-1900s, when the British military personnel played against expatriate employees of the Kuwait Oil Company. Most informal matches were played on makeshift pitches—often on sand or grassless fields.

In 1974, expatriate representatives from the rugby clubs in the United Arab Emirates, Bahrain, Qatar, and Saudi Arabia, joined to form a union called the Arabian Gulf Rugby Football Union (AGRFU), which started to grow the game in the region. Its primary focus was to build an infrastructure and develop the game across the region, developing players, coaches and officials.

It was during this period the now famous Dubai Sevens was founded and became the nations flagship rugby event.

=== 2010–2018: Building UAE Rugby ===
By 2010, the AGRFU was dissolved, allowing the individual countries to take full control of their rugby development to allow for focused growth of the game in each country.

Founded in 2010, the then UAE Rugby Association, was responsible for developing and growing the game in the United Arab Emirates and was awarded full membership status of the Asian Rugby Football Union in June 2011. By October 2012, the local government of youth and sorts upgraded the organisation to the UAE Rugby Federation after it showed its commitment in developing and growing the game in the United Arab Emirates.

The UAE's first test match was on 23 April 2011 against Sri Lanka as part of the 2011 Asian Five Nations, which ended in a 13–all draw. A week later, the UAE earned their first win, defeating Kazakhstan 24–10 in Abu Dhabi.

After a competitive inaugural appearance in the Asian Five Nations competition, the UAE were included in the inaugural World Rugby Cup of Nations competition, where they joined other developing rugby nations Brazil, Hong Kong and Kenya in a round-robin tournament held in Dubai.

By November 2012, the UAE Rugby Federation was awarded full membership status by World Rugby, the highest recognition that a Union could be awarded, which allowed the side to be part of the 2015 Rugby World Cup Asia qualification process which commenced in April 2013. In their first attempt of World Cup qualification, the UAE were eliminated in their first round, losing all their matches during the 2013 Asian Five Nations to see them also relegated from the top flight Asian competition for 2014.

By 2015, the UAE has slipped into the second division of Asian Rugby (in effect the third tier in Asia), where they remained for two seasons. But despite being promoted back to Division 1 for 2017, they were later relegated back to Division 2 for 2018, and thus ending their chances of qualification for the 2019 Rugby World Cup.

=== 2018–onwards: Growth of Asian rugby ===
The side failed to compete in 2018, and returned to competitive rugby ahead of the 2019 season, where they won the second division and was promoted for 2020. However, due to the COVID-19 pandemic, the UAE did not play a game until 2023, where they then defeated Pakistan 188–3 on aggregate to return to the top flight championship for 2024.

In returning to the Asian Rugby Championship for 2024, the UAE reignited their chances for World Cup qualification in 2027. With an expanded competition for the 2027 event, the qualification process granted Asia a direct spot into the World Cup alongside the already qualified Japan. This encouraged further development for the UAE, and after finishing in second in the 2024 Asia Rugby Championship, World Rugby stepped in to facilitate international test matches during the 2024 November international window.

In July 2025, the UAE finished as runner-up in the 2025 Asia Rugby Championship, seeing them advance to World Cup qualification play-offs, the first time they have made it out of their regional bracket.

== Overall ==
Below is a table of the representative rugby matches played by the United Arab Emirates national XV at test level up until 26 July 2025.

Opponent	Played	Won	Lost	Drawn	Win %	For	Aga	Diff
Belgium	1	0	1	0	0%	3	94	–91
Brazil	1	0	1	0	0%	3	66	–63
Chinese Taipei	1	1	0	0	100%	16	12	+4
Cyprus A	1	1	0	0	100%	34	19	+15
Germany	1	0	1	0	0%	20	26	–6
Gibraltar	1	1	0	0	100%	28	15	+7
Guam	1	1	0	0	100%	82	7	+75
Hong Kong	7	0	7	0	0%	55	420	–365
Japan	3	0	3	0	0%	6	310	–304
Kazakhstan	2	2	0	0	100%	70	41	+29
Kenya	2	0	2	0	0%	41	109	–68
Malaysia	3	1	2	0	50%	103	75	+28
Namibia	1	0	1	0	0%	29	86	–57
Pakistan	2	2	1	0	100%	188	3	+185
Philippines	2	0	2	0	0%	34	48	–24
Singapore	1	0	1	0	0%	13	30	–17
South Korea	4	2	2	0	50%	105	190	–85
Sri Lanka	3	1	1	1	33.33%	59	67	–8
Thailand	3	3	0	0	100%	172	52	+120
Tunisia	1	0	1	0	0%	7	15	–8
Uzbekistan	1	1	0	0	100%	63	13	+50
Zimbabwe	2	0	2	0	0%	36	127	–91
Total	44	16	27	1	36.36%	1,167	1,835	–668

== Tournament history ==
=== Rugby World Cup ===
Rugby World Cup record										Qualification						
Year	Round	Pld	W	D	L	PF	PA	Squad	Head coach	Pos	Pld	W	D	L	PF	PA
(New Zealand) (Australia) 1987	Did not enter									Did not enter						
(England) (France) (Ireland) (Scotland) (Wales) 1991	Did not enter									Did not enter						
(South Africa) 1995	Did not enter									Did not enter						
(Wales) 1999	Did not enter									Did not enter						
(Australia) 2003	Did not enter									Did not enter						
(France) 2007	Did not enter									Did not enter						
(New Zealand) 2011	Did not enter									Did not enter						
(England) 2015	Did not qualify									Round 3	4	0	0	4	28	245
(Japan) 2019	Did not qualify									Round 2	5	2	0	3	200	134
(France) 2023	Did not enter									Did not enter						
(Australia) 2027	Did not qualify									P/O	7	4	0	3	209	289
(United States) 2031	To be determined									To be determined						
Total	—	—	—	—	—	—	—	—	—	—	16	6	0	10	437	668
Champions; Runners–up; Third place; Fourth place; Home venue

=== Asia Rugby Championship ===
Asia Rugby Championship record
Year	Division	Position	P	W	D	L	F	A
2013	Five Nations	Fifth	4	0	0	4	28	245
2014	Division 1	Third	1	0	0	1	13	30
2015	Division 2	Runners-up	3	2	0	1	88	64
2016	Division 2	Champions	2	2	0	0	133	31
2017	Division 1	Fourth	3	0	0	3	65	103
2019	Division 2	Champions	2	2	0	0	132	19
2023	Division 1	Champions	2	2	0	0	188	3
2024	Championship	Runners-up	3	2	0	1	103	103
2025	Championship	Runners-up	3	2	0	1	77	100
Total			23	12	0	11	827	698

=== Cup of Nations ===
Cup of Nations record
Year	Position	P	W	D	L	F	A
2011	Fourth	3	0	0	3	29	193
2012	Fourth	3	0	0	3	23	210
Total		6	0	0	6	52	403

== Squad ==
UAE players selected for the 2025 Asia Rugby Championship.

Head Coach: (South Africa) Jacques Benade

- Caps updated: 5 July 2025 (after Sri Lanka v UAE)

Note: Flags indicate national union for the club/province as defined by World Rugby.

Player	Position	Date of birth (age)	Caps	Club/province
Moeneeb Galant	Hooker		10	(United Arab Emirates) Dubai Exiles RFC
Michael Sejean	Hooker		3	(United Arab Emirates) Dubai Sharks
Riaan Barnard	Prop		10	(United Arab Emirates) Barrelhouse RC
Epeli Davetawalu	Prop	28 June 1989 (age 37)	10	(United Arab Emirates) Dubai Exiles RFC
Pieter Kilian	Prop	7 February 1992 (age 34)	10	(United Arab Emirates) Dubai Sharks
Lukas Waddington	Prop	4 December 1991 (age 34)	12	(United Arab Emirates) Dubai Exiles RFC
Jaen Botes	Lock	5 March 1990 (age 36)	18	(United Arab Emirates) Dubai Exiles RFC
Marcus Guerin	Lock	1 December 1993 (age 32)	8	(United Arab Emirates) Dubai Tigers RFC
Brad Janes	Back row		3	(United Arab Emirates) Jebel Ali Dragons
Ethan Mathews	Back row		3	(United Arab Emirates) Dubai Hurricanes
Chris McKee	Back row		7	(United Arab Emirates) Abu Dhabi Harlequins
Matthew Mills (c)	Back row	14 August 1988 (age 38)	12	(United Arab Emirates) Dubai Exiles RFC
Sean Stevens	Back row	15 November 1990 (age 35)	5	(United Arab Emirates) Abu Dhabi Harlequins
Emosi Vecanaua	Back row		4	(United Arab Emirates) Shaheen Rugby
Sam Bullock	Scrum-half		2	(England) Esher
Dave Evans	Scrum-half		3	(United Arab Emirates) Abu Dhabi Harlequins
Andrew Semple	Scrum-half		8	(United Arab Emirates) Abu Dhabi Harlequins
Max Johnson	Fly-half		3	(Qatar) Doha RFC
James Crossley	Centre	6 January 1993 (age 33)	6	(United Arab Emirates) Dubai Exiles RFC
Jack Stapley	Centre	28 April 1996 (age 30)	4	(England) Nottingham
Justin Walsh	Centre	3 April 1992 (age 34)	5	(United Arab Emirates) Dubai Exiles RFC
Liam Caldwell	Wing		6	(United Arab Emirates) Dubai Exiles RFC
Sakiusa Naisau	Wing	26 May 1992 (age 34)	12	(United Arab Emirates) Dubai Tigers RFC
Tobias Oakeley	Wing		9	(United Arab Emirates) Dubai Hurricanes
Niko Volavola	Wing	1 January 1994 (age 32)	3	(United Arab Emirates) Jebel Ali Dragons
Gerard Pieterse	Fullback		3	(England) CS Rugby 1863

== Past coaches ==
Years	Coach
2012–2013	(Australia) Duncan Hall Jr.
2014–2015	(South Africa) Roelof Kotze
2015–2023	(Samoa) Apollo Perelini
2024–present	(South Africa) Jacques Benade

== See also ==
- Rugby union in the Arabian Peninsula
- United Arab Emirates national rugby sevens team
- Dubai Sevens
