= Kazakhstan national rugby union team =

Kazakhstan
- Nickname: The Nomads
- Union: Kazakhstan Rugby Union
- Head coach: Van Deventer Ludwiche Hermanus
- Captain: Magomedrassyl Magomedov
First colours	Second colours

World Rugby ranking
- Current: 60 (as of 8 June 2026)
- Highest: 59 (2026)

First international
- Georgia 17–5 Kazakhstan (4 March 1994)

Biggest win
- Kazakhstan 114–5 Kyrgyzstan (3 July 2022)

Biggest defeat
- Japan 101–7 Kazakhstan (10 Dec 1998)

The Kazakhstan national rugby union team, nicknamed "The Nomads", is controlled by the Kazakhstan Rugby Union. Kazakhstan have been participating in international competition since 1994 after their independence from the USSR.

In 2007, the fortunes of the team greatly improved by winning all five of their matches and rising 14 places in the IRB World Rankings to 32nd. This rise was the biggest by any international team over the year. This led to the team being entered into the top division of the new Asian Five Nations in 2008.

Kazakhstan are now one of the leading rugby union nations in Asia, finishing second in the 2009 and 2010 Asian Five Nations to continent heavyweights Japan on both occasions. Their second-place finish in 2010 saw them advance to the four-team playoff for a final place at the 2011 Rugby World Cup. They lost 44–7 to Uruguay in Montevideo, being eliminated but it was still their best result yet. They have yet to qualify for a Rugby World Cup finals.

== Asian Games ==
Rugby union at the 1998 Asian Games – Men

Japan 118–3 Kazakhstan

Chinese Taipei 27–11 Kazakhstan

== Asian Five Nations Record ==
Asia Rugby Championship

- 2002 ARFU Asian Rugby Championship
- 2004 ARFU Asian Rugby Championship
- 2006–07 ARFU Asian Rugby Championship
- 2008: 4th
- 2009: 2nd
- 2010: 2nd
- 2011: 4th
- 2012: 5th

2024: QAT 33-31 KAZ / SRI 45-7 KAZ

2023: QAT 35-10 KAZ / KAZ 29-22 IND

2022: KAZ 32-24 UZB / KAZ 113-5 KGZ

2019: KAZ 17-8 GUM / THA 38-20 THA

2018: KAZ 48-0 PAK / KAZ 55-6 MGL

2015: KAZ 35-25 LBN / ALG 15-0 KAZ / ALG 26-5 KAZ / KAZ 32-12 SIN / SRI 35-14 KAZ

2014: KAZ 37-8 TPE (2014 Asian Five Nations division tournaments)

2013: SRI 49-18 KAZ / KAZ 42-10 TPE / THA 33-10 KAZ

2012: HKG 55-0 KAZ / KOR 87-17 KAZ / UAE 46-31 KAZ / JPN 87-0 KAZ

2011: KAZ 34-18 SRI / JPN 61-0 KAZ / UAE 24-10 KAZ / HKG 23-10 KAZ

2010: URU 44-7 KAZ / KAZ 32-25 KOR / JPN 101-7 KAZ / HKG 19-15 KAZ / KAZ 43-28 Arab Team

== Record ==
Below is a table of the representative rugby matches played by a Kazakhstan national XV at test level up until 4 May 2024, updated after match with Sri Lanka.

Opponent	Played	Won	Lost	Drawn	% Won
Algeria	2	0	2	0	0%
Arabian Gulf	6	4	2	0	66.67%
China	2	0	2	0	0%
Georgia	1	0	1	0	0%
Guam	2	2	0	0	100%
Hong Kong	5	1	4	0	20%
India	4	4	0	0	100%
Japan	5	0	5	0	0%
Junior Japan	1	0	1	0	0%
Kyrgyzstan	1	1	0	0	100%
Lebanon	1	1	0	0	100%
Malaysia	2	2	0	0	100%
Mongolia	1	1	0	0	100%
Pakistan	1	1	0	0	100%
Qatar	2	1	1	0	50%
Singapore	4	3	1	0	75%
South Korea	5	2	3	0	40%
Sri Lanka	10	6	4	0	60%
Taiwan	5	3	2	0	60%
Thailand	6	2	4	0	33.33%
United Arab Emirates	2	0	2	0	0%
Uruguay	1	0	1	0	0%
Uzbekistan	1	1	0	0	100%
Total	70	35	35	0	50%

== See also ==
- Kazakhstan national rugby sevens team
- Kazakhstan women's national rugby union team
- Rugby union in Kazakhstan
