= Beirut Phoenicians RFC =

Beirut Phoenicians
- Full name: Beirut Phoenicians Rugby FC
- Founded: 1995

Beirut Phoenicians Rugby Club was the first rugby union club team/club in Lebanon. It was established in 1995 in response to a request from the British embassy for a rugby team to play HMS Cardiff that was docked in Beirut for a few days in November 1995.
