= Jakarta Komodos Rugby Club =

The Jakarta Komodos Rugby Football Club (JKRFC) is a rugby union club based in Jakarta, Indonesia.

== History ==
The Jakarta Komodos Rugby Football Club was formed as ISCI Rugby in 1971 by members of the International Sports Club of Indonesia. The club has promoted the development of rugby in Indonesia, especially among young Indonesians.

In 2012, when Jakarta formed a regular rugby union competition, there were four clubs: Jakarta Banteng, Jakarta Komodos, Jakarta Japan Rugby Gila (JJRG) Samurai, and the Bandung Rams. The Jakarta Komodos were the winners of the inaugural competition.

== Membership ==
The Jakarta Komodos is Indonesia's most successful rugby club and consists of a Veterans’ team, Seniors’ side and age-group teams down to Under-7s.

The club, which has more than 200 registered players, has sponsored teams of local players, including a team of female players from the Mama Sayang Orphanage in Jonggol, south of Jakarta. In April 2016, three of the players from the orphanage were selected in Indonesia's national women's sevens rugby side that toured Singapore.

The Jakarta Komodos travel throughout Southeast Asia for tournaments and tour matches. The club in 2013 competed at the Phuket International Rugby 10s tournament for the first time. The club has also fielded teams in the annual Singlife Girls Rugby TRC Cup in Singapore.

The Jakarta Komodos organizes the annual Jakarta International Rugby 10s tournament, which includes men's, women's, juniors and veterans divisions contested by teams from across Asia. The 2020 tournament was postponed because of the novel coronavirus pandemic.

Six members of the Komodos club were among the victims of the 2002 Bali bombings that killed 202 people. The players had been in Bali for a rugby tournament.
