= Qatar national rugby union team =

Qatar
- Union: Qatar Rugby Federation
- Most caps: Abulaziz Al Dosari; Tom Featherstone (17)

World Rugby ranking
- Current: 90 (as of 4 November 2024)
- Lowest: 94 (2024)

First international
- Qatar 26–8 Jordan (Dubai, United Arab Emirates; 11 May 2011)

Biggest win
- Qatar 77–0 Jordan (Doha, Qatar; 30 March 2019)

Biggest defeat
- Qatar 22–31 Malaysia (Doha, Qatar; 20 May 2014)

The Qatar national rugby union team represents Qatar in men's international rugby union. The team plays in the West Asia division of the Asia Rugby Championship. The Qatar Rugby Federation is a full member of Asia Rugby and an associate member of World Rugby.

== History ==
Prior to 2011, the Qataris had some involvement with the Arabian Gulf rugby union team.

The Qatar national team made its debut in the 2011 Asian Five Nations fourth division. The team, with a blend of veteran international players qualifying under IRB residency regulations and young local players, beat both Jordan and Lebanon to claim the divisional title.

== Record ==
Below is a table of the representative rugby matches played by a Qatar national XV at test level up until 15 May 2026, updated after match with Saudi Arabia.

Opponent	Played	Won	Lost	Drawn	% Won
China	1	1	0	0	100%
Guam	1	1	0	0	100%
India	2	2	0	0	100%
Iran	3	2	1	0	66.67%
Jordan	3	3	0	0	100%
Kazakhstan	2	1	1	0	50%
Lebanon	4	4	0	0	100%
Malaysia	1	0	1	0	0%
Saudi Arabia	1	1	0	0	100%
Thailand	1	1	0	0	100%
Uzbekistan	1	1	0	0	100%
Total	20	17	3	0	85%

== 2016 ==
The Qatar Rugby Federation hosted Asia Rugby Championship Division III at the Aspire warm up and purpose built rugby pitch on the 16, 19 and 22 of April.

Qatar	35 - 12	Iran
Iran	12 - 34	Lebanon
Qatar	25 - 19	Lebanon

== 2018 ==
Qatar will be competing in the Asia Rugby Championship in 2018.

== Current squad ==
The Qatar squad for the Asia Rugby Championship Division 2 2023, caps updated 10 May 2023,

Player	Position	Date of birth (age)	Caps	Club/province
Abdulaziz Al-Dosari	Hooker	28 July 1984 (age 42)	17	Qatar Camels
Wade Lotter	Hooker	21 February 1990 (age 36)	3	(Qatar) Doha RFC
Brett Allam	Prop	17 November 1989 (age 36)	3	(Qatar) Doha RFC
Dylan Pietersen	Prop	11 December 1986 (age 39)	3	Bahrain RFC
Nicholas Lock	Prop	21 September 1988 (age 38)	3	(Qatar) Doha RFC
Steve Elumeze	Prop	29 January 1977 (age 49)	4	Qatar Camels
Joseph Dharshan De Silva Goobetilleke	Prop	12 September 1985 (age 41)	11	(Qatar) Doha RFC
Darshan Gangineni	Lock	29 August 2003 (age 23)	2	(Qatar) Doha RFC
Huw Kinsella	Lock	12 August 1983 (age 43)	5	(Qatar) Al Khor RFC
Guy Briggs	Lock	2 November 1989 (age 36)	3	(Qatar) Doha RFC
Ismail El Hatmi	Lock	11 July 1989 (age 37)	7	Qatar Camels
Guillermo Villegas Bardo	Back row	2 January 1989 (age 37)	5	(Qatar) Doha RFC
Tom Featherstone	Back row	12 March 1990 (age 36)	17	(Qatar) Doha RFC
Dave Ford (c)	Back row	27 April 1987 (age 39)	7	(Qatar) Doha RFC / (Wales) Newport HSOB RFC
Elliot Johnston	Back row	10 April 1987 (age 39)	4	(Qatar) Doha RFC
Thomas Metcalf	Back row	23 May 1987 (age 39)	3	(Qatar) Blue Falcons RFC
James Phillips	Scrum-half	25 August 1994 (age 32)	3	(Qatar) Doha RFC
Murshid Ahmat	Scrum-half	2 October 1983 (age 43)	1	(Qatar) Orycx RFC
Brook Tremayne	Fly-half	25 November 1988 (age 37)	5	(New Zealand) Kaierau RFC / (New Zealand) Whanganui
Abdulaziz Alhanek	Fly-half	24 February 1999 (age 27)	3	Qatar Camels
Iliesa Rakabu	Centre	10 July 1990 (age 36)	3	Qatar Camels
Johann-Henry Bezuidenhout	Centre	27 October 1994 (age 31)	3	(Qatar) Doha RFC
Pita Tuilagi Beracibi	Centre	1 July 1994 (age 32)	2	Qatar Camels
Breda Dreyer	Centre	16 July 1992 (age 34)	1	(Qatar) Doha RFC
Badre Bakaddouri	Wing	16 July 1992 (age 34)	7	Qatar Camels
Frank Hughes	Wing	6 November 1986 (age 39)	3	(Qatar) Doha RFC
Mubarak Al Malik	Wing	25 March 1987 (age 39)	2	Qatar Camels
Oliver Kinnaird-Barr	Wing	22 February 2003 (age 23)	1	(England) St George's Rugby
Hamza Saied	Fullback	4 October 1997 (age 29)	2	Qatar Camels
Oussama Lakhbib	Fullback	24 February 2000 (age 26)	7	Qatar Camels
Beau Swart	Fullback	23 June 2000 (age 26)	2	(Netherlands) ASCRUM

== HSBC Asian 5 Nations (Division III) ==
Qatar have been promoted to Division III of the HSBC Asian Five Nations. Division III is made up of four teams, China, Indonesia, Guam and Qatar.

Qatar won both of their matches in the 2013 Asian 5 Nations held in Kuala Lumpur, securing a promotion to Division II in next year's tournament.

=== Training Ground ===
Aspire Warm-Up Track

=== Sponsorship ===
Qatar Duty Free, are currently the sole sponsor for the Qatar Rugby Team. Helping to supply the team with kits and traveling gear.

=== Website ===
http://www.qatarugby.com/
