= Lebanon national rugby union team =

Lebanon
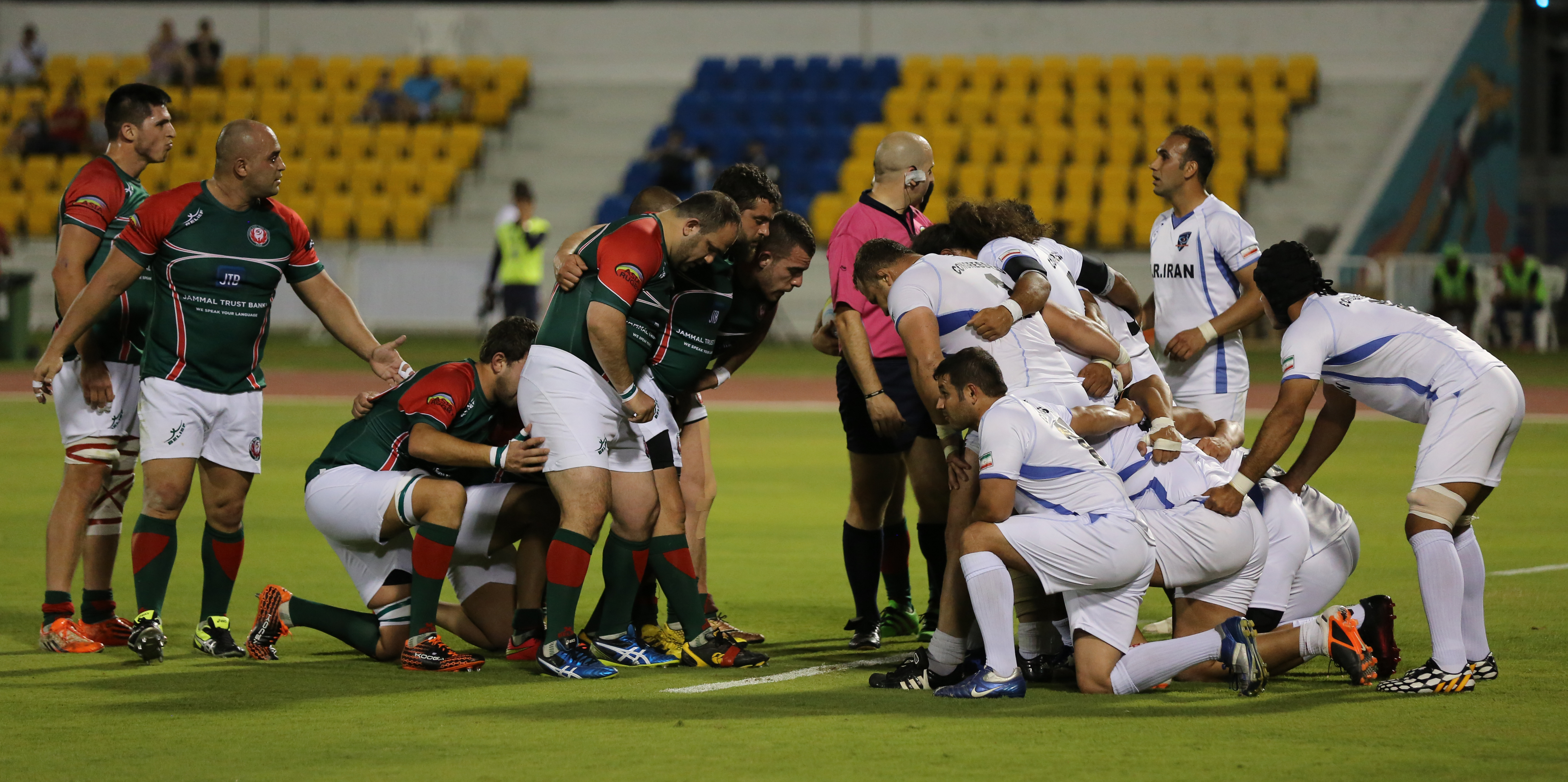
- Full name: Lebanese National Rugby Team
- Unions: Lebanese Rugby Union Federation (LRUF)
- Nickname: The Phoenix
- Emblem: Phoenix Emblem
- Founded: 2002
- Location: Lebanon
- Region: Beirut
- Ground: Fouad Chehab Stadium (Capacity: 4000)
- Chairman: Ghassan Hajjar
- CEO: Sol Mokdad
- Director of Rugby: Steve Wrigglesworth
- Coach(es): Steve Penberthy, Rony Bhachour
- Captain: Karim Jammal (9)
- Most caps: 14
- Fly-Half
Team kit	Change kit

First international
- Lebanon 104 – 0 Morocco (2 november 2002)

Largest win
- Lebanon 104 – 0 Morocco (17 november 1999)

Largest defeat
- Lebanon 0 – 80 Russia (28 september 2008)

Official website
- www.lebanonrugby.com

The Lebanese National Rugby Union team have yet to make their debut at the Rugby World Cup. Lebanon played their first test match against Jordan on 14 May 2010 in Dubai The Phoenix currently competes in the Asian Rugby Football Union's, Asian Rugby Championship in Division Three West. In November 2018 Lebanon Rugby attained World Rugby Associate Membership.

In March 2017, Lebanon competed in the Asian Rugby Championship, hosted by Uzbekistan in Tashkent. Lebanon defeated Iran 25 to 24 in the semi-final and drawing with hosts Uzbekistan 24 all in the final of the tournament to run out narrow ARC Div III West Champions.

On 24 April, Lebanon hosted the 2018 Asian Rugby Championship Division 3 West tournament in Jounieh, Lebanon. They defeated Jordan in the first round 62 – 3 and won against Iran 27 – 17 who had defeated Qatar in the semi-final to secure their fifth Asian title in six years.

== Current squad ==
Backs
Player	Position	Club
Karim Jammal	Scrum-half	(United States) San Diego
Hassan Al Jammal	Wing/Centre/Fullback	(Lebanon) Beirut Phoenicians RUFC
Georges Cassab	Scrum-half	(Lebanon) Jamhour Lions RFC
Omar Hamaoui	Scrum-half	(Lebanon) Beirut Phoenicians RUFC
Ben Abood	Fly-half	(Australia) South Sydney Rams
Lawrence Abood	Fly-half	(Australia) Saint Patricks
Jad Hashem	Fly-half	(United Arab Emirates) Beaver Nomads Rugby Team
Raymond Asfour	Centre	(England) Catford RUFC
Steve Pere	Wing	(Lebanon) Jounieh Dragons RFC
Robin Hachache	Centre	(Lebanon) Beirut Phoenicians RFC
Anthony Manassa	Wing	(Australia) Eastwood
Fadi Saad	Wing	(Australia) Sydney University Rugby Club.
Martin Wahbe	Fullback	(Australia) Eastwood
Thomas Alexander Saliba	Fullback	(England) Finchley RFC

Forwards
Player	Position	Club
Tariq Khaldi	Prop	(England) Barnes RFC
Rony Bachour	Prop	(England) Staines RFC
Salem ElDessouki	Prop	(Canada) Calgary Canadian Irish Athletic
Feda ElDessouki	Hooker	(Canada) Calgary Canadian Irish Athletic
Fadi Barakat Diab	Prop	(United Arab Emirates) Kuwait Scorpions
Joshua Taweel	Hooker	(Australia) West Harbour Rugby Club
Mohammed Turk	Hooker	(France) RC Compiègnois
Raymond Finan	Lock	(Lebanon) Beirut Phoenicians RFC
Mounir Finan	Lock	(Lebanon) Beirut Phoenicians RFC
Joe Bakhache	Hooker	(Lebanon) French Froggies RFC
Cyril Irani	Prop	(Lebanon) Jamhour Blacklions RFC
Firas El Chami	Lock	(Germany) TSV Handschuhsheim
Bilal Elbatoury	Prop	(Australia) Sydney University Football Club
Kamil Abdallah	Flanker	(Australia) Balmain Rugby Football Club
Jason Khoury	Flanker	(Australia) West Harbour Rugby Football Club
Ibrahim Ballout	Flanker	(Lebanon) Beirut Phoenicians RFC
François Zgheib Fournier	Flanker	(United States) San Diego
Camil Abou Farhat	Flanker	(Lebanon) Jamhour Blacklions RFC
Rudy Hachache	Number 8	(Lebanon) Beirut Phoenicians RFC
Frederick Makhlouf	Flanker	(United Arab Emirates) Jebel Ali Dragons
Kahil Bejjani	Flanker	(Lebanon) Beirut Phoenicians RFC
Sol Mokdad	Lock	(Lebanon) Beirut Phoenicians RFC
Joseph Touma	Number eight	(England) Barking Rugby Football Club

A full list of all capped Lebanese players: https://web.archive.org/web/20180428120026/http://www.lruf.org/player-profiles/

== Record ==
Below is a table of the representative rugby matches played by a Lebanon national XV at test level up until 26 May 2023, updated after match with Jordan.

Opponent	Played	Won	Lost	Drawn	% Won
Iran	4	4	0	0	100%
Jordan	7	6	1	0	85.71%
Kazakhstan	1	0	1	0	0%
Malaysia	1	0	1	0	0%
Pakistan	2	2	0	0	100%
Qatar	4	0	4	0	0%
Uzbekistan	5	4	0	1	80%
Total	24	16	7	1	66.67%

=== Hounors ===
Middle-East Africa Championship – 2015

Mediterranean Cup – 1999, 2002, 2003, 2004, 2016, 2017

Middle-East and North-African Cup – 2012

== See also ==
- Rugby union in Lebanon
