= Thailand national rugby union team =

Rugby national team representing Thailand

Thailand
- Union: Thai Rugby Union
First colours	Second colours

World Rugby ranking
- Current: 71 (as of 14 September 2026)
- Highest: 71 (14 September 2026)
- Lowest: 80 (2024)

First international
- Japan 82–8 Thailand (8 March 1969)

Biggest win
- India 6–90 Thailand (28 October 1998)

Biggest defeat
- Japan 141–10 Thailand (4 November 1996)

The Thailand national rugby union team represents Thailand in men's international Rugby union. The Thai national team is yet to play at the Rugby World Cup, but has been playing in qualifying tournaments since the 1999 Rugby World Cup in Wales.

== History ==
Thailand played their first ever rugby international in 1970. Thailand first attempted to qualify for a World Cup in 1999 when Wales was the host. They competed in Round 1 of the Asia qualifying tournament, winning and losing one match; seeing them finish second in the final standings, and knocking them out of contention to qualify. For the 2003 Rugby World Cup in Australia, Thailand participated in Pool B of the Asia qualification tournament, but finished third in the standings after losing both of their fixtures.

Thailand attempted to qualify for the 2007 Rugby World Cup in France as well, and were grouped with Sri Lanka and Singapore. However they lost both of their fixtures and did not advance to the next stage.

Within the Asian Five Nations, they competed in the inaugural 2008 HSBC Asian Five Nations in Division Two. After winning all their matches, they will play in the First Division for the 2009 event, taking the place of the Chinese team, (which withdrew due to visa problems) Sri Lanka who finished last stay in Division One because of this.

== Rugby World Cup record ==
Year	Round	Position	Notes
1987	—	—	No qualifying tournament held
1991	—	—	Did not enter
1995	—	—	Did not enter
1999	—	—	Did not qualify
2003	—	—	Did not qualify
2007	—	—	Did not qualify
2011	—	—	Did not qualify
2015	—	—	Did not qualify
2019	—	—	Did not qualify
2023	—	—	Did not enter

== Asia Rugby Championship ==
Asia Rugby Championship – Thailand record (Division 2 / equivalent)
Year	Host nation / Venue	Format	Position	P	W	L	Notes
2014	—	Round-robin	Fourth place	—	—	—	Participated in Division 2
2017	Chinese Taipei	Round-robin	—	—	—	—	Notable win vs Chinese Taipei (27–21)
2018	Thailand (Pattaya)	Knockout	Runner-up	2	1	1	Beat India (SF), lost final to Chinese Taipei
2019	Thailand (Hua Hin)	Knockout	Runner-up	2	1	1	Beat Kazakhstan (SF), lost final to UAE
2022	Pakistan (Lahore)	Two-leg final	Runner-up	2	1	1	Lost title on aggregate (38–39) to Pakistan
2024	—	League / Union Cup	—	—	—	—	Participated under Asia Rugby Union Cup structure

== Record ==
Below is a table of the representative rugby matches played by a Thailand national XV at test level up until 15 July 2026, updated after match with Guam.

Opponent	Played	Won	Lost	Drawn	% Won
Arabian Gulf	3	1	2	0	33.33%
China	3	1	2	0	33.33%
Guam	2	2	0	0	100%
Hong Kong	10	3	7	0	30%
India	8	8	0	0	100%
Iran	2	1	1	0	50%
Japan	1	0	1	0	0%
Junior Japan	8	0	8	0	0%
Kazakhstan	6	4	2	0	66.67%
Laos	1	1	0	0	100%
Malaysia	38	24	9	5	63.16%
Pakistan	3	2	1	0	66.67%
Philippines	2	0	2	0	0%
Qatar	1	0	1	0	0%
Scotland A	1	0	1	0	0%
Singapore	22	11	9	2	50%
South Korea	11	1	9	1	9.09%
Sri Lanka	14	4	9	1	28.57%
Taiwan	17	5	12	0	29.41%
United Arab Emirates	3	0	3	0	0%
Total	156	68	79	9	43.59%

== Squad ==
Squad to 2012 Asian Five Nations - Division 3

- Chiramat Budnampeth
- Pongnatee Ngoenthong
- Thodspornchai Jindasawat
- Sarayuth Thiengtrong
- Suparat Kongtawee
- Sumet Thammapom
- Chatree Wannadit
- Pinit Inta
- Nuntapol Potipirom
- Pawaj Jarunapat
- Pichit Yingcharoen
- Tanyavit Kuasint
- Yatchakorn Vorachate
- Korrrapong Wongsalangkarn
- Warongkorn Khamkoet

Substitutes

- Adsawin Thiamyod
- Chaninthorn Banluesup
- Chawiatt Klongtroujrok
- Chaisak Piromkraipak
- Chestaphol Promtaree
- Kittisak Boonprakob
- Nuttapong Kaittlbunnawat

== See also ==
- Rugby union in Thailand
