= Brunei national rugby union team =

Brunei
- Union: Brunei Rugby Football Union
- Coach: (Malaysia) Ainol Razman
- Captain: Faez "Eazy' Anuar
Team kit	Change kit

First international
- Singapore 23–3 Brunei (Kallang, Singapore; 8 May 1999)

Largest win
- Brunei 32–17 Laos (Phnom Penh, Cambodia; 27 June 2006)

Largest defeat
- Philippines 101–0 Brunei (Dededo, Guam; 28 June 2008)

The Brunei national rugby union team represents Brunei in international rugby union. They have yet to make their debut at the Rugby World Cup. It is governed by the Brunei Rugby Football Union (BRFU).

== History ==
Rugby Union, which is played in 105 countries around the world, has been played in Brunei since the 1950s.

The Brunei Rugby Football Union was set up in 1977, affiliated to the Rugby Football Union (RFU) of Twickenham. From then on, Brunei regularly sent teams to participate in regional 'Sevens' competitions, particularly the SCC Sevens in Singapore and the prestigious Hong Kong Sevens.

Since joining the Asian Rugby Football Union, the Brunei Rugby Team has taken part in a number of international competitions. Although presently recording a somewhat unfavorable Win-loss ratio in the international rugby scene, Brunei rugby is continually improving with efforts concentrating on youth players' development through the Under-19 Squad.

The Brunei national rugby union team plays in the Asian Rugby Football Union 6th Division along with Indonesia, Cambodia and Laos.

== Record ==
Below is a table of the representative rugby matches played by a Brunei national XV at test level up until 12 May 2018, updated after match with China.

Opponent	Played	Won	Lost	Drawn	% Won
Cambodia	8	3	5	0	37.5%
China	1	0	1	0	0%
Guam	2	0	2	0	0%
Indonesia	2	0	2	0	0%
Laos	5	2	3	0	40%
Mongolia	1	0	1	0	0%
Philippines	1	0	1	0	0%
Singapore	1	0	1	0	0%
Total	21	5	16	0	23.81%

== Under-19 Squad ==
The Under-19 National Rugby Squad of Brunei is seen as a platform from which the Brunei Rugby Football Union seeks to develop young players for the Senior team. Currently, the Under-19 squad has played in two Asian Under-19 Rugby Tournaments (as of September 2007) in Lahore, Pakistan and Taipei, Taiwan respectively.

The first ever Brunei Under-19 Rugby International was played against the Pakistan Under-19 Team at the Fortress Stadium in Lahore. Brunei emerged victorious with a scoreline of 14-5 in their favour - an upset considering the comparative populations and rugby history of the respective countries. Former Fiji National coach George Dreadon Simpkin commented on the impressive pace of the Bruneian backline whilst spectating the encounter. The free-running style of open, fast-paced play has become a trademark of the Bruneian team, although it has come under heavy criticism for sacrificing form and discipline in the favour of quick, energy-consuming tries.

The members of the first ever Brunei Under-19 Squad selected for the 2005 Asian Under-19 Rugby Tournament are as follows:

Manager: Stuart Alpe

Coaches: Tim Lian (Backs), Shafeek Kamalie (Forwards)

Players: 1. Muhd Khairuddeen bin D.P Haji Hamzah 2. Hj Mohd Azmiee Hj Mohd Sunnylai 3. Adrin Anak Salanjat 4. Yeo Hock Wee 5. Mohd Halim Mustaffa 6. Emmanuel bin Surat 7. Mohd Zulfadhli bin Haji Md Jali 8. Abd Amir bin Matjaneh 9. Ak Abd Muiz Pg Hj Abd Rahman 10. Muhammed Raushan Mohd Yuzer 11. Lim Shen Quan 12. Md Isa bin Haji Mohamad 13. Dinlee Ak Apo 14. Faridzul Daud Ak Dumi 15. Rangga Ak Tinggi 16. Christian Daniel Wong Kim Him 17. Md Hanafi Yusof 18. Mohd Farhan Hj Ismail 19. Mohd Sallihen Hj Bujang 20. Samuel Tan Yon Xiang 21. Ak Muhd Zulhilmi Pg Suhaimi 22. Muhammad Aziman bin Awang Nasir

== See also ==
- Rugby union in Brunei
- Brunei national rugby union team (sevens)
