= Guam national rugby union team =

Guam
- Emblem: Latte stone
- Union: Guam Rugby Football Union
- Head coach: Tony Penn
- Captain: Paul Claros
- Home stadium: Wettengel Rugby Field

World Rugby ranking
- Current: 89 (as of 2 June 2025)
- Highest: 71 (2023)
- Lowest: 76 (2024)

First international
- Guam 8–8 India (Dededo, Guam; 18 June 2005)

Biggest win
- Guam 74–0 Brunei (Dededo, Guam; 28 June 2008)

Biggest defeat
- United Arab Emirates 82–7 Guam (Hua Hin, Thailand; 15 May 2019)

World Cup
- Appearances: 0

The Guam national rugby union team represents the United States territory of Guam in international rugby union. They have yet to make their debut at the Rugby World Cup, though they have attempted to qualify for the World Cup.

The national side is ranked 89th in the world (as of 2 June 2025).

== History ==
Guam attempted to qualify for the 2007 Rugby World Cup in France, taking part in Division 3 Pool B of Round 1a of the Asian qualifying tournament. They competed against three other nations in the pool; Kazakhstan, India and Malaysia.

In their first match of the pool competition, Guam played India in Guam and drew 8-all with them. However they then lost 51–6 to Kazakhstan and 44–15 to Malaysia. In 2006 they played two internationals, a 14–18 loss against the Philippines and a 27–22 loss against Pakistan.

== World Cup record ==
- 1987 - No qualifying tournament held
- 1991 - 2003 - Did not enter
- 2007 - Did not qualify
- 2011 - Did not enter
- 2015 - Did not qualify

== Overall record ==
Below is a table of the representative rugby matches played by a Guam national XV at test level up until 18 July 2026, updated after match with Laos.

Opponent	Played	Won	Lost	Drawn	Win %	For	Aga	Diff
Brunei	2	2	0	0	100%	140	12	+128
China	4	2	2	0	50%	114	98	+16
India	3	0	2	1	0%	24	73	-49
Indonesia	5	5	0	0	100%	160	53	+107
Iran	1	0	1	0	0%	11	44	-33
Kazakhstan	2	0	2	0	0%	14	68	-54
Laos	2	2	0	0	100%	133	22	+111
Pakistan	2	1	1	0	50%	59	37	+22
Philippines	4	0	4	0	0%	45	102	-57
Qatar	1	0	1	0	0%	7	13	-6
Taiwan	1	0	1	0	0%	14	45	-31
Thailand	2	0	2	0	0%	36	46	-10
United Arab Emirates	1	0	1	0	0%	7	82	-75
Uzbekistan	1	1	0	0	100%	23	22	+1
Total	31	13	17	1	41.94%	787	717	+68

== Squad ==
Squad to 2012 Asian Five Nations - Division 3

- Leonard Calvo
- Brandon O'Mallan
- Carlos Eustaquio
- Sixto Quintanilla
- Fabian Garces
- James Basil O'Mallan
- Paul Claros (c)
- Steven Sablan
- Vinson Calvo
- Vern Lokeijak
- Jacob Flores
- Stephen Santos
- Randy Mendiola
- Gerard Aguon
- Paul Eustaquio
- Edward Calvo
- Neil James
- Joshua Jude 'Outside J' Paulino
- Casey Howard 'C-Swag' Zinser

Substitutes

- Matthew Toves
- Earl Pascual
- John Arceo
- Brian Romiro
- Paul Calvo
- Mario Martinez
- Jesse Manglona

== Honours ==
Asia Rugby Championship

- Division 3 Champions: 2015, 2018

== See also ==
- Rugby union in Guam
- 2007 Rugby World Cup - Asia qualification
- Guam national rugby sevens team
- Guam women's national rugby union team
