= 2009 Asian Five Nations =

2nd edition of the Asian Five Nations and 22nd Asian Rugby Championship

- Date: 25 April 2009 – 24 May 2009
- Countries: Hong Kong; Japan; Kazakhstan; South Korea; Singapore

Final positions
- Champions: Japan (17th title)

Tournament statistics
- Matches played: 10
- Website: www.asian5nations.com

The 2009 Asian Five Nations, known as the 2009 HSBC Asian 5 Nations due to its sponsorship by HSBC, was the second series of the rugby union Asian Five Nations, the flagship competition devised by the International Rugby Board to develop the sport in the Asian region. The tournament played a role in qualifying for the 2011 Rugby World Cup, with Singapore, the last place team, being relegated to Division 1. As the 2010 edition will serve as the final round of Asian qualifying, Singapore is effectively eliminated.

== Changes from 2008 ==
- Arabian Gulf has been replaced with Singapore, who earns promotion from Division 1.

== Teams ==
The teams involved, with their world rankings pre tournament, were:

- Hong Kong (31)
- Japan (16)
- Kazakhstan (34)
- South Korea (23)
- Singapore (49)

== Final Table ==
Position	Nation	Games				Points				Table points	
Position	Nation	Played	Won	Drawn	Lost	For	Against	Difference	Tries	Bonus Points	Points
1	Japan	4	4	0	0	271	40	+231	41	4	24
2	Kazakhstan	4	3	0	1	87	139	-52	10	0	15
3	South Korea	4	2	0	2	137	144	-7	19	3	13
4	Hong Kong	4	1	0	3	110	126	-16	8	3	8
5	Singapore	4	0	0	4	40	196	-156	1	1	1

Scoring System

- Win – 5 Points
- Draw – 3 Points
- Loss – 0 Points
- Bonus points for scoring four tries or for losing by no more than 7 points.
- Results

=== Fixture overview ===
Home	Score (Tries)	Away	Match Information
Home	Score (Tries)	Away	Date	Venue
(1 BP) South Korea	65–0	Singapore	25 Apr 2009	Tancheon Sports Complex, Seongnam
(1 BP) Japan	87–10	Kazakhstan	25 Apr 2009	Kintetsu Hanazono Rugby Stadium, Osaka
Hong Kong	6–59	Japan (1 BP)	2 May 2009	Hong Kong Football Club Stadium, Hong Kong
Kazakhstan	30–27	South Korea (1 BP)	2 May 2009	Central Stadium, Almaty
Singapore	19–22	Kazakhstan	9 May 2009	Yio Chu Kang Stadium, Singapore
(1 BP) South Korea	36–34	Hong Kong (2 BP)	9 May 2009	Tancheon Sports Complex, Seongnam
(1 BP) Japan	80–9	South Korea	16 May 2009	Kintetsu Hanazono Rugby Stadium, Osaka
(1 BP) Hong Kong	64–6	Singapore	16 May 2009	Hong Kong Football Club Stadium, Hong Kong
Singapore	15–45	Japan (1 BP)	23 May 2009	Yio Chu Kang Stadium, Singapore
Kazakhstan	25–6	Hong Kong	24 May 2009	Central Stadium, Almaty

=== Fixtures ===
25 April 2009

South Korea	65–0	Singapore
Tries: Kwang Moon Lee (2); Si Won Choi (2); Sung Soo Sim (2); Kun-kyu Han (2); Keun Hyun Kim (2); Yo Han Cha; Con: Jun Ki Hong (3); Keun Hyun Kim (2)	Report

Tancheon Sports Complex, Seongnam

25 April 2009

Japan	87–11	Kazakhstan
Tries: Shaun Webb (2); Yuta Imamura (2); Ayumu Goromaru (2); Takashi Kikutani; Bryce Robins; Yuki Yatomi; Luke Thompson; Michael Leitch; Jack Tarrant; Hiroki Yoshida; Con: Shaun Webb (9); Ayumu Goromaru (2)	Report	Try: Ildar Abdrazakov; Con: Denis Cherkashin; Pen: Denis Cherkashin

Kintetsu Hanazono Rugby Stadium, Osaka

2 May 2009

Hong Kong	6–59	Japan
Pen: Kenzo Pannell (2)	Report	Tries: Kensuke Hatakeyama (2); Naoki Kawamata; Hitoshi Ono; Yosshitaka Nakayama; Takashi Kikutani; Fumiaki Tanaka; Hirotoki Onozawa; Jack Tarrant; Con: Ryan Nicholas (7)

Hong Kong Football Club Stadium, Hong Kong

2 May 2009

Kazakhstan	30–27	South Korea
Tries: Anton Rudoy (3); Con: Maxim Lifontov (3); Pen: Maxim Lifontov (3)	Report	Tries: Jae Yong Chae; Dae Ik Jeong; Kun-kyu Han; Con: Jun Ki Hong; Kuen Hyun Kim (2); Pen: Keun Hyun Kim; Drop: Jun Ki Hong

Central Stadium, Almaty

9 May 2009

Singapore	19–22	Kazakhstan
Try: Ben Wheeler; Con: John Forrester; Pen: John Forrester (4)	Report	Tries: Mihail Soloviyev; Denis Cherkashin; Oleg Gusselnikov; Con: Maxim Lifontov (2); Pen: Maxim Lifontov

Yio Chu Kang Stadium, Singapore

9 May 2009

South Korea	36–34	Hong Kong
Tries: Kun-kyu Han (2); Shing Yong Chul; Youn Kwon Woo; Park Noh Hoon; Hwang Min Seo; Con: Chae Jae Yong; Lee Jung Min (2)	Report	Tries: Adam Raby (3); Simon Smith; Ed Rolston; Con: Kenzo Pannell (2); Jonny Elliot; Pen: Kenzo Pannell

Tancheon Sports Complex, Seongnam

16 May 2009

Japan	80–9	South Korea
Tries: Hitoshi Onozawa (4); Shaun Webb (2); Ryan Nicholas (2); Jack Tarrant (2); Ayumu Goromaru; Yuta Imamura; Con: Ryan Nicholas (7); Shaun Webb (3)	Report	Pen: Jun Ki Hong (2); Drop: Jun Ki Hong

Kintetsu Hanazono Rugby Stadium, Osaka

16 May 2009

Hong Kong	64–6	Singapore
Tries: Adam Raby (4); Rowan Varty (3); Simon Smith (2); Con: Kenzo Pannell (7); Mike McKee; Pen: Kenzo Pannell	Report	Pen: John Forrester (2)

Hong Kong Football Club Stadium, Hong Kong

23 May 2009

Singapore	15–45	Japan
Pen: Ryan Cumbers (5)	Report	Tries: Hitoshi Ono (2); Takashi Kikutani; Yuta Imamura; Koji Taira; Masakazu Toyota; Con: Hiroki Yoshida (5)

Yio Chu Kang Stadium, Singapore

24 May 2009

Kazakhstan	25–6	Hong Kong
Tries: Timur Mashurov; Daulet Akymbekov; Ildar Abdrazakov; Con: Maxim Lifontov (2); Pen: Maxim Lifontov (2)	Report	Pen: Kenzo Pannell; Keith Robertson

Central Stadium, Almaty
