= China national rugby union team =

China
- Emblem: Plum blossom
- Union: Chinese Rugby Football Association
- Head coach: Chenglong Liu
First colours

World Rugby ranking
- Current: 81 (as of 4 November 2024)
- Lowest: 82 (14 January 2023)

First international
- Singapore 33–3 China (1 November 1997)

Biggest win
- China 74–17 India (26 June 2019)

Biggest defeat
- South Korea 100–3 China (9 September 2006)

The China national rugby union team represents the People's Republic of China in international rugby union. China have yet to make their debut at the Rugby World Cup, but attempted to qualify in both 2003 and 2007.

China play their home games in shirts of amber and red with the Chinese flag in the right chest and the away strip is a red shirt with amber sleeves, the red flag is not so clear but still on the away strip being the same colour as the shirt.

The national side is ranked 82nd in the world.

== History ==
China played its first international in 1997 against Singapore.

China attempted to qualify for the 2003 Rugby World Cup in Australia, taking part in the Asia qualifying tournaments. They started in Pool C of Round 1, playing matches against Sri Lanka and Kazakhstan. Played in April, China lost 9-7 to Sri Lanka, and then defeated Kazakhstan 57-15. They finished at the top of the final standings due to a better points difference, and advanced to Round 2. However, they were knocked out in Round 2, losing both their fixtures against Hong Kong and Chinese Taipei.

China participated in qualifying competitions for the 2007 Rugby World Cup as well. They started in Division 2 of Round 1, contesting matches against the Arabian Gulf rugby union team and Chinese Taipei. China defeated Chinese Taipei 22-19 in their first game, but lost against the Arabian Gulf team, seeing them finish second, and moving into Division 2 of Round 2. However, China lost both their fixtures in Round 2 against Hong Kong and Sri Lanka. China was slated to participate in qualifying for the 2011 Rugby World Cup. However, they were forced to drop out due to visa complications.

China's national sevens team regularly participates in legs of the annual sevens tour, appearing consistently in the Hong Kong tournament. China has traditionally fared quite well, with recent results including a bowl victory in 2007 and a win over Scotland in the 2008 pool stage.

== Record ==
=== World Cup ===
World Cup record
Year	Qualification status
(Australia) (New Zealand) 1987	Not invited
(England) (France) (Ireland) (Scotland) (Wales) 1991	did not enter
(South Africa) 1995	did not enter
(Wales) 1999	did not enter
(Australia) 2003	did not qualify
(France) 2007	did not qualify
(New Zealand) 2011	did not qualify
(England) 2015	did not qualify
(Japan) 2019	did not enter
(France) 2023	did not enter

=== Overall ===
Opponent	Played	Won	Lost	Drawn	% Won
Arabian Gulf	1	0	1	0	0%
Brunei	1	1	0	0	100%
Chinese Taipei	3	2	1	0	66.67%
Guam	4	2	2	0	50%
Hong Kong	5	1	3	1	20%
India	4	3	1	0	75%
Indonesia	5	4	1	0	80%
Iran	1	0	1	0	0%
Kazakhstan	2	2	0	0	100%
Pakistan	1	1	0	0	100%
Malaysia	5	2	3	0	40%
Qatar	1	0	1	0	0%
Singapore	5	3	1	1	60%
South Korea	1	0	1	0	0%
Sri Lanka	6	1	5	0	16.67%
Thailand	3	2	1	0	66.67%
Total	48	24	22	2	50%

== Squad ==
Squad to 2019 Asia Rugby Championship

- Head coach: (China) Chenglong Liu

Player	Position	Club
Wang Shixue	Hooker	
Fu Chunyu	Hooker	
Chen Yongqiang (c)	Prop	
Wang Kai	Prop	
Li Jialin	Prop	
Zhang Chao	Prop	
Lu Xiaotang	Lock	
Yang Kai	Lock	
Fan Xiaolong	Lock	
Tian Xun	Flanker	
Lu Yingli	Flanker	
Liu Zhonglei	Flanker	
Jovilisi Sadau	Number 8	(China) Chongqing Rangers
Bai Xiangzheng	Scrum-half	
Yang Siyuan	Scrum-half	
Ratu Totivi Dakainiviti Ralulu	Fly-half	(China) Chongqing Rangers
Liu Xiaohui	Fly-half	
Matthew Neil Holding	Centre	(China) Shanghai Rugby Football Club
Ronnie Gardiner	Centre	
Tong Mingqi	Centre	(China) Chongqing Rangers
Zhou Cong	Wing	
Liu Junkui	Wing	(Hong Kong) South China Tigers
Ma Chong	Fullback	(Hong Kong) South China Tigers

== See also ==
- 2003 Rugby World Cup - Asia qualification
- 2007 Rugby World Cup - Asia qualification
- 2011 Rugby World Cup - Asia qualification
