= Chinese Taipei national rugby union team =

Chinese Taipei
- Nicknames: Taiwan, Republic of China
- Union: Chinese Taipei Rugby Football Union
- Head coach: Hung Chi Hsiang
- Captain: Chien Tzu Fan

World Rugby ranking
- Current: 61 ▲4 (as of 21 September 2026)
- Lowest: 66 (2024)

First international
- Hong Kong 27–0 Chinese Taipei (Tokyo, Japan; 10 March 1969)

Biggest win
- Chinese Taipei 86–3 Singapore (Hong Kong; 13 November 1988)

Biggest defeat
- Japan 155–3 Chinese Taipei (Tokyo, Japan; 6 July 2002)

World Cup
- Appearances: 0

The Chinese Taipei national rugby union team represents the Republic of China (Taiwan) in international rugby union. Chinese Taipei have yet to make their debut at the Rugby World Cup, but have attempted to qualify since Wales 1999.

== History ==
The team is referred to as "Chinese Taipei" rather than Taiwan or Republic of China for political reasons.

The Chinese Taipei finished at the top of their Round 2 pool in qualifying tournaments for the 1999 Rugby World Cup, winning both of their fixtures; defeating Sri Lanka and Malaysia. They advanced to Round 3, where they defeated Hong Kong.

In July, 2002 Chinese Taipei was in the unenviable position of being beaten by Japan 155-3. In May of the same year, Paraguay was beaten by the same margin by Argentina at 152-0, however, unlike Paraguay, Chinese Taipei scored some points in their match.

For qualifying tournaments for the 2003 Rugby World Cup in Australia, they won Pool A of Round 1, advancing to Round 2. There they faced both Hong Kong and China. The Chinese Taipei again finished at the top of the pool, winning both of their fixtures. The Chinese Taipei advanced to Round 3, however they lost their fixtures against Japan and Korea, knocking them out of the tournament. Their attempt to qualify for the 2007 Rugby World Cup was in Division 2, Round 1 of Asia qualifying.

== Record ==
Below is a table of the representative rugby matches played by a Chinese Taipei national XV at test level up until 18 July 2026, updated after match with Singapore.

Opponent	Played	Won	Lost	Drawn	% Won
Arabian Gulf	2	0	2	0	0%
Belgium A	1	1	0	0	100%
China	3	1	2	0	33.33%
Guam	1	1	0	0	100%
Hong Kong	21	6	14	1	28.57%
Hong Kong A	5	2	2	1	40%
India	3	3	0	0	100%
Iran	1	1	0	0	100%
Japan	4	0	4	0	0%
Junior Japan	12	0	12	0	0%
Kazakhstan	5	2	3	0	40%
Malaysia	9	5	4	0	55.56%
Mongolia	1	0	1	0	0%
Pakistan	1	1	0	0	100%
Philippines	1	0	1	0	0%
Singapore	16	11	5	0	68.75%
South Korea	13	0	13	0	0%
Sri Lanka	14	8	6	0	57.14%
Thailand	16	12	4	0	75%
United Arab Emirates	1	0	1	0	0%
Total	130	54	74	2	41.54%

== Squad ==
Hung Chi Hsiang named a 23 man squad for the 2024 Unions Cup in Singapore.

Chinese Taipei squad for 2024 Unions Cup
Name	Position	Caps	Club
Yeh Tai Ting	Prop	4	(Taiwan) Tainan Kaier
Ma Sheng En	Prop	0	(Taiwan) Hai Yang Ocean Feed
Ye Cheng Yu	Prop	0	(Taiwan) Tainan Kaier
Chun Yu Chun	Prop	0	(Taiwan) Taipei Medical University
Tsai Yu Tang	Hooker	0	(Taiwan) Taipei Yuan Kun
Cen Yu Qi	Hooker	0	(Taiwan) Tainan Kaier
Liu Chia Yu	Lock	0	(Taiwan) New Taipei Lei Xu Lions
Chang Yu Cheng	Lock	0	(Taiwan) Taipei Yuan Kun
Huang Pin Gui	Lock	0	(Taiwan) Taipei Yuan Kun
Cheng An Ting	Lock	0	(Taiwan) Taipei Yuan Kun
Yao Chih Yao	Backrow	0	(Taiwan) Taipei Yuan Kun
Huang Yi Kai	Backrow	0	(Taiwan) Hai Yang Ocean Feed
Hong Jing Che	Backrow	0	(Taiwan) Tainan Kaier
Shen Ming Kuang	Scrum-half	6	(Taiwan) Hai Yang Ocean Feed
Chen Chun Chi	Scrum-half	0	(Taiwan) Taipei Yuan Kun
Luo Yi Hong	Fly-half	0	(Taiwan) Taipei Yuan Kun
Chien Tzu Fan (c)	Centre	4	(Taiwan) Tainan Kaier
Wang Jia Xian	Centre	0	(Taiwan) Hai Yang Ocean Feed
Cheng Yu Min	Centre	0	(Taiwan) New Taipei Lei Xu Lions
Huang Jian Ying	Outside Back	0	(Taiwan) Taipei Yuan Kun
Shin Jai Yung	Outside Back	0	(Taiwan) Taipei Yuan Kun
Huang Yuan Cheng	Outside Back	0	(Taiwan) Taipei Yuan Kun
Xie Bing Yi	Outside Back	0	(Taiwan) Taipei Yuan Kun

== World Cup record ==
- 1987 - No qualifying tournament held
- 1991 - 1995 - Did not enter
- 1999 - 2015 - Did not qualify
- 2019 Rugby World Cup - Did not enter
- 2023 Rugby World Cup - Did not enter
- 2027 Rugby World Cup - Did not enter

== See also ==
- 2003 Rugby World Cup - Asia qualification
- 2007 Rugby World Cup - Asia qualification
- 2011 Rugby World Cup - Asia qualification
- 2015 Rugby World Cup – Asia qualification
