= Uzbekistan national rugby union team =

Uzbekistan
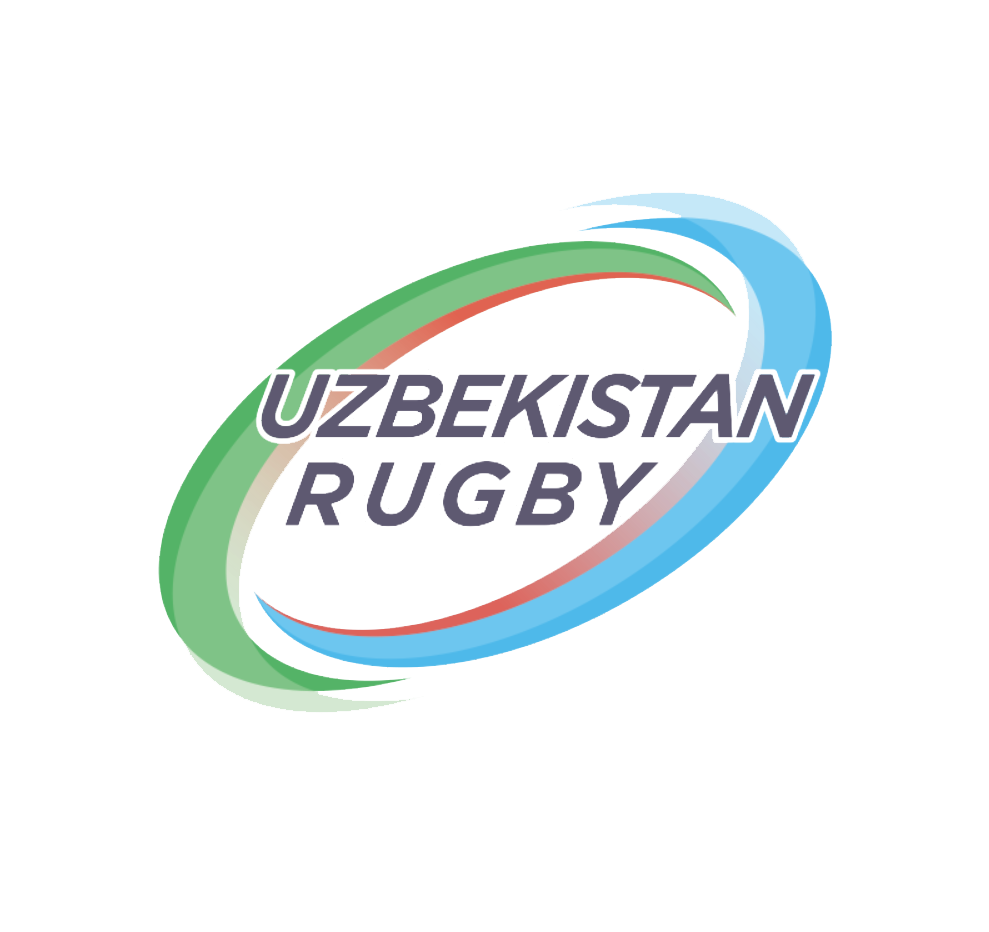
- Union: Uzbekistan Rugby Federation
First colours

World Rugby ranking
- Current: 91 (as of 4 November 2024)
- Highest: 89 (2024)
- Lowest: 91 (2024)
- Website: Uzbekistan Rugby

The Uzbekistan national rugby union team is a member of World Rugby and has yet to play in a Rugby World Cup tournament. The Uzbekistan Rugby Federation was established in 2001 and became a full member of World Rugby in 2014.

== Record ==
Below is a table of the representative rugby matches played by an Uzbekistan national XV at test level up until 6 July 2022, updated after match with Kazakhstan.

Opponent	Played	Won	Lost	Drawn	% Won
Guam	1	0	1	0	0%
India	3	2	1	0	66.67%
Iran	2	0	1	1	0%
Jordan	4	1	3	0	25%
Kazakhstan	1	0	1	0	0%
Kyrgyzstan	3	2	0	1	66.67%
Laos	1	1	0	0	100%
Lebanon	5	0	4	1	0%
Malaysia	1	0	1	0	0%
Mongolia	1	1	0	0	100%
Pakistan	2	1	1	0	50%
Qatar	1	0	1	0	0%
United Arab Emirates	1	0	1	0	0%
Total	26	8	16	2	30.77%

== Squad ==
Squad to 2019 Asia Rugby Championship

- Head coach: (Uzbekistan) Malkhaz Maghlaperidze

Forwards
Player	Position
Okhunjou Jumaev	Hooker
Akbar Kenjaev	Hooker
Bahodir Orzikulov (c)	Prop
Jahongir Abdukadirov	Prop
Furkat Nazarov	Prop
Avazbek Khakimov	Prop
Azamat Pardaev	Lock
Sergey Kurbanov	Lock
Sanjar Sadullayev	Lock
Akrom Chorshanbiev	Flanker
Muzaffar Ashurov	Flanker
Shokhrukh Akramov	Flanker
Khusniddin Bobojonov	Number 8

Backs
Player	Position
Usmoujou Nematov	Scrum-half
Izzatullo Yusupov	Scrum-half
Jaulonbek Rajabov	Fly-half
Sardor Kuldashev	Centre
Sobirjon Sobirov	Centre
Ramazan Allaev	Centre
Okhunjon Tukhtasinov	Wing
Bakhitiyor Sirojiddinov	Wing
Ruslan Matkurbanov	Fullback
