= Iran national rugby union team =

Iran
- Nickname: Team Melli
- Emblem: Faravahar
- Union: Iran Rugby Federation
- Head coach: Alireza Fazlollah Arabi
- Captain: Soroush Mohammad Hoseini Nokhandan
- Home stadium: Azadi Training Pitch 4
First colours	Second colours

World Rugby ranking
- Current: 95 (as of 4 November 2024)
- Highest: 94 (2023)

First international
- Iran 22–11 Pakistan (18 August 2007)

Biggest win
- Iran 52–3 China (2 June 2012)

Biggest defeat
- Malaysia 48–10 Iran (4 June 2013)

World Cup
- Appearances: 0

The Iran national rugby union team (Persian: تیم ملی راگبی یونیون ایران) is a sporting side that represents Iran in rugby union and is controlled by the I.R. Iran Rugby Federation. The I.R. Iran Rugby Federation is a member of World Rugby and the Asian Rugby Football Union (ARFU).

The team currently competes in Division 3 (West) of the Asian Rugby Championship.

== History ==
On August 18, 2007, Iran played its first international friendly as part of the Pakistan Tour and won 22–11 in Lahore, Pakistan.

=== Results summary ===
Below is a table of the representative rugby matches played by an Iran national XV at test level up until 10 February 2023, updated after match with Qatar.

Against	Played	Won	Drawn	Lost	%Won
China	1	1	0	0	100%
Chinese Taipei	1	0	0	1	0%
Guam	1	1	0	0	100%
India	3	3	0	0	100%
Indonesia	1	1	0	0	100%
Jordan	1	1	0	0	100%
Kyrgyzstan	1	1	0	0	100%
Lebanon	4	0	0	4	0%
Malaysia	2	0	0	2	0%
Pakistan	3	3	0	0	100%
Philippines	1	0	0	1	0%
Qatar	3	1	0	2	33.33%
Thailand	2	1	0	1	50%
Uzbekistan	2	1	1	0	50%
Total	26	14	1	11	53.85%

== Honours ==
- 2007 IRB Singer Rugby Asiad Shield Championship
- 2008 Asian Five Nations Central Asia Regional tournament Champions
- 2010 Asian Five Nations Division III tournament Champions
- 2013 West Asia Championship in Dubai

== Coaches ==
- (Iran) Sadegh Nabidoust (2007)
- (Iran) Emil Vartazarian (2007)
- (New Zealand) Rob Yule (2008–2009)
- (Iran) Sadegh Nabidoust (2010)
- (New Zealand) Wayne Marsters (2010–2011)
- (Iran) Sadegh Nabidoust (2011)
- (Iran) Mahyar Askari (2012)
- (Iran) Pedram Baniamerian (2013)
- (Republic of Ireland) Liam Dunseath (2016)
- (Iran) Mahyar Askari 2019–present

== See also ==
- Rugby union in Iran
