= Cambodia national rugby union team =

Cambodia
- Union: Cambodian Federation of Rugby
- Nickname: Koupreys
- Emblem: The Kouprey
- Ground: RCAF Old Stadium
- Coach: John Mojsa
- Captain: Vannak Vireak

First international
- Cambodia 7 - 46 Macau (Hong Kong; 22 May 2005)

Largest win
- Cambodia 38 - 0 Brunei (Phnom Penh, Cambodia; 5 July 2013)

Largest defeat
- Indonesia 55 - 3 Cambodia (Jakarta, Indonesia; 19 July 2008)

World Cup
- Appearances: none

The Cambodia national rugby union team, nicknamed the Koupreys, represents Cambodia in the sport of rugby union. The national team is administered by the Cambodian Federation of Rugby, which is part of Asia Rugby.

The Koupreys have been inactive since at least 2015, their last recorded match being a 25-20 win against Brunei on 21 June 2014. Cambodia has yet to make their debut at the Rugby World Cup.

== History ==
Cambodia's first match was against Macau in Hong Kong on 22 May 2005, a curtain raiser to a 2007 Rugby World Cup qualifier, which resulted in a 7-46 loss for them. Their first victory by 30-7 followed in 2006, against Indonesia as part of the 2006 ARFU Asian Rugby Series Regional tournament which they hosted in Phnom Penh and also won.

== Record ==
Below is a table of the representative rugby matches played by a Cambodia national XV at test level up until 21 June 2014, updated after match with Brunei.

Opponent	Played	Won	Lost	Drawn	Win %	For	Aga	Diff
Brunei	8	5	3	0	62.5%	196	88	+108
Indonesia	3	1	2	0	33.33%	43	73	-30
Laos	11	3	8	0	27.27%	147	198	-51
Macau	1	0	1	0	0%	7	46	-39
Mongolia	1	0	1	0	0%	5	49	-44
Total	24	9	15	0	37.5%	398	454	-56

== Tournament history ==
=== Asia Rugby Championship ===
Asia Rugby Championship record
Year	Position	P	W	D	L	F	A
(Cambodia) 2006	Champions	3	3	0	0	101	17
(Brunei) 2007	Silver	3	2	0	1	66	35
Total	6 titles	106	63	2	42	3705	2205
