= Pakistan national rugby union team =

Pakistan
- Nickname: The Greenshirts
- Union: Pakistan Rugby Union
- Head coach: Gert Mulder
First colours

World Rugby ranking
- Current: 90 (as of 2 June 2025)
- Highest: 90 (2 June 2025)
- Lowest: 94 (29 July 2019)

First international
- Sri Lanka 75–3 Pakistan (27 October 2003)

Biggest win
- Pakistan 82–0 Kyrgyzstan (16 May 2018)

Biggest defeat
- United Arab Emirates 95–0 Pakistan (4 July 2023)

The Pakistan national rugby union team represents Pakistan in international rugby union. Pakistan is a member of the International Rugby Board (IRB), and have yet to play in a Rugby World Cup tournament. As of 2021, they will play in Division II of the Asian championships, having been promoted from Division III in 2019.

In the 19 March 2012 IRB World Rankings, Pakistan, along with Mexico and Philippines, were listed, entering with the base rating of 40 points (which positioned the three national teams in 71st place). The national side was ranked 90th in the world, as of 2 June 2025.

== History ==
The Pakistan national team made their international debut in a match against Sri Lanka in 2003, losing 75-3. They won their first match in 2006 against Guam by 27-22. Recently Pakistan Under-19 Rugby Team participates in South Asian A5N Rugby 7s Championship 2013 and won Gold.

Since their first match, Pakistan have played a total of 27 matches, with only 6 wins and 21 losses.

Pakistan rugby sevens made its international debut at the 2014 Asian Games in Incheon, South Korea, in the Pool B with matches against China, Hong Kong, and the Philippines.

== Strip ==
Pakistan play in green jerseys with gold and white trim.

== Record ==
=== World Cup ===
- 1987 - No qualifying tournament held
- 1991-1999 - Not into existence
- 2003-2007 - Did not enter
- 2011-2019 - Did not qualify

=== Overall ===
Below is a table of the representative rugby matches played by a Pakistan national XV at test level up until 8 July 2023, updated after match with United Arab Emirates.

Opponent	Played	Won	Lost	Drawn	% Won
China	1	0	1	0	0%
Chinese Taipei	1	0	1	0	0%
Guam	2	1	1	0	50%
India	7	0	7	0	0%
Indonesia	3	1	2	0	33.33%
Iran	3	0	3	0	0%
Kazakhstan	1	0	1	0	0%
Kyrgyzstan	1	1	0	0	100%
Laos	1	1	0	0	100%
Lebanon	2	0	2	0	0%
Macau	1	1	0	0	100%
Malaysia	1	0	1	0	0%
Philippines	1	1	0	0	100%
Sri Lanka	1	0	1	0	0%
Thailand	3	1	2	0	33.33%
United Arab Emirates	2	0	2	0	0%
Uzbekistan	2	1	1	0	50%
Total	33	8	25	0	24.24%

== Current squad ==
Squad for the 2022 Asia Rugby Championship.

Forwards
Player	Position
Meer balaj	Hooker
Israr Ahmed	Hooker
Hammad Safdar	Prop
Syed Muhammad Moiz Ali Shah	Prop
Raheel Ashraf	Prop
Saaim Maqbool	Prop
Muhammad Waqas	Lock
Syed Muhammad Dawood Ali Shah	Lock
Romail Ashraf	Lock
Muhammad Ali Khan	Flanker
Arfan Ali	Flanker
Muhammad Bilal	Flanker
Ali Shahid	Number 8

Backs
Player	Position
Daud Gill	Scrum-half
Mehorz afzal	Scrum-half
Khalid mehmood	Fly-half
Muhammad Aqib Siddique	Fly-half
Amsal khan wardag	Centre
Muhammad Haroon	Centre
Khalid Hussain Bhatti	Wing
Saad Arif	Wing
Faisal Aslam	Wing
Omair khan	Fullback

== See also ==
- Rugby union in Pakistan
- Sports in Pakistan
- 2011 Rugby World Cup – Asia qualification
- Rugby World Cup
