= Laos national rugby union team =

Laos
- Union: Lao Rugby Federation

World Rugby ranking
- Current: 95 (as of 4 November 2024)
- Highest: 94 (2023)

First international
- Malaysia 31–10 Laos (Colombo, Sri Lanka; 17 November 1974)

Biggest win
- Laos 70–7 Brunei (Phnom Penh, Cambodia; 28 June 2012)

Biggest defeat
- Philippines 74–0 Laos (Saraburi, Thailand; 12 July 2026)

World Cup
- Appearances: 0

The Laos national rugby union team represents Laos in international rugby union. Its first international match was against Malaysia in 1974, losing 34 points to 10. After this it did not field an international side again until 2006. The Lao Rugby Federation is the governing body. Laos has been an associate member of World Rugby (formerly IRB) since November 2004.

== Overall ==
Below is a table of the representative rugby matches played by a Laos national XV at test level up until 18 July 2026, updated after match with Guam.

| Opponent | Played | Won | Lost | Drawn | % Won |
|---|---|---|---|---|---|
| Brunei | 5 | 3 | 2 | 0 | 60% |
| Cambodia | 11 | 8 | 3 | 0 | 72.73% |
| Guam | 2 | 0 | 2 | 0 | 0% |
| Indonesia | 5 | 1 | 4 | 0 | 20% |
| Malaysia | 1 | 0 | 1 | 0 | 0% |
| Pakistan | 1 | 0 | 1 | 0 | 0% |
| Philippines | 1 | 0 | 1 | 0 | 0% |
| Singapore | 1 | 0 | 1 | 0 | 0% |
| Sri Lanka | 1 | 0 | 1 | 0 | 0% |
| Thailand | 1 | 0 | 1 | 0 | 0% |
| Uzbekistan | 1 | 0 | 1 | 0 | 0% |
| Total | 30 | 12 | 18 | 0 | 40% |
