= 2026 Asia Rugby Championship =

Rugby union competition for men's national teams

- Dates: 23 May – 14 June 2026
- Countries: Hong Kong China; South Korea; Sri Lanka

Final positions
- Champions: Hong Kong (7th title)

Tournament statistics
- Matches played: 2
- Tries scored: 11 (5.5 per match)
- Attendance: 2,500 (1,250 per match)

The 2026 Asia Rugby Championship (Note: Known as the 2026 Asia Rugby Emirates Men's Championship for sponsorship reasons.) was the tenth annual rugby union series for Asia Rugby. The tournament was confirmed in January 2026 to kick off in May, with the same four nations returning from the previous edition (2025): Hong Kong China, South Korea and Sri Lanka.

The United Arab Emirates were also due to compete, but on 29 April, the United Arab Emirates withdrew from the Championship due to the war in Iran causing uncertainty in safety and travel within the surrounding region. On 9 May, a refined schedule was announced.

The defending champions were Hong Kong China who won the title after defeating South Korea 70–22 and simultaneously qualified for the 2027 Rugby World Cup for the first time.

They ultimately won the title for the seventh time.

== Background and format ==
The format of the series was a single play-off match, followed by a single round-robin where the competing teams played each other once, with the games reversed from the 2025 to allow for an equal share of home games over two years. The team that finished on top of the standings at the end of the series were declared the winners. The team is finishing at the bottom of the standings in contention for relegation.

== Participants ==
| Team | Stadium | | | Head coach | Captain | World Rugby Ranking | |
| Team | Home stadium | Capacity | Location | Head coach | Captain | Start (Note: As of 23 May 2026) | End (Note: As of 14 June 2026) |
|---|---|---|---|---|---|---|---|
| Hong Kong China | Hong Kong Football Club Stadium | 2,750 | Happy Valley, Hong Kong | Logan Asplin | Dean Squire | 23rd | 23rd |
| South Korea | Incheon Namdong Asiad Rugby Field | 4,968 | Namdong, Incheon | Lee Myung-geun | Lee Hyeon Je | 37th | 38th |
| Sri Lanka | Colombo Racecourse | 10,000 | Cinnamon Gardens, Colombo | Dushanth Lewke | Tharindu Chathuranga | 48th | 48th |

== Standings ==
Champions

| Pos | Team | Pld | W | D | L | PF | PA | PD | TF | TA | TB | LB | Pts |
|---|---|---|---|---|---|---|---|---|---|---|---|---|---|
| 1 | Hong Kong China | 2 | 2 | 0 | 0 | 60 | 23 | +37 | 9 | 2 | 1 | 0 | 9 |
| 2 | South Korea | 2 | 1 | 0 | 1 | 9 | 45 | −36 | 0 | 7 | 1 | 0 | 5 |
| 3 | Sri Lanka | 2 | 0 | 0 | 2 | 14 | 15 | −1 | 2 | 2 | 0 | 1 | 1 |

Source: Asia Rugby

== Fixtures ==
=== Game 1 ===
24 May 2026
15:00 SLST (UTC+5:30)

| (1 BP) Sri Lanka | 14–15 | Hong Kong China |
| Try: Amanath 47' c Marasinghe 60' c Con: Nanayakkara (1/1) 48'; Zubair (1/1) 61'; Cards: Bandara (yellow card) 27' | Report; Match details | Try: Rossouw 44' c Lung 79' c Con: McCann (1/1) 45'; White (1/1) 80'; Pen: McCann (1/1) 22'; Cards: Higson-Smith (yellow card) 68' |

Colombo Racecourse, Colombo
Attendance: 500
Referee: James Fairbourn (UAE)

=== Game 2 ===
7 June 2026
16:30 HKT (UTC+8)

| (1 BP) Hong Kong China | 45–9 | South Korea |
| Try: Fameitau 11' m Higson-Smith 24' c Nell 47' c Bartlett (2) 54' c, 57' c Rossouw 70' c Brechin 80' m Con: McCann (5/7) 25', 48', 55', 58', 71' | Report; Match details | Pen: Bu Hyon (3/3) 3', 23', 30'; Cards: Dong Wan (yellow card) 70' |

Hong Kong Football Club Stadium, Happy Valley
Attendance: 2,000
Referee: Tetsuya Hirakawa (Japan)

=== Game 3 ===
13 June 2026
15:00 KST (UTC+9)

| (1 BP) South Korea | 20–0; Walkover | Sri Lanka |

Incheon Namdong Asiad Rugby Field, Incheon

South Korea won on walkover because Sri Lanka was unable to obtain the necessary travel visas required to enter Korea in time for the match.
