= 2027 Men's Rugby World Cup – Asia qualification =

Tournament details
- Dates: 30 April 2024 – 5 July 2025
- No. of nations: 8

The qualifying process for the 2027 Men's Rugby World Cup for Asian teams commenced in April 2024, with eight teams competing for one qualification spot (Asia 1) and one spot in a play-off match (Asia 2).

The Asian qualifying process concluded in July 2025, with Hong Kong qualifying for the World Cup (as Asia 1) for the first time, becoming the second Asian nation to appear in the World Cup.

== Format ==
The Asia Rugby Championship, governed by Asia Rugby, was the regional qualification tournament for Rugby World Cup 2027, with the top two divisions in the region acting as the process, and eight teams entering (Japan, who compete in the Pacific Nations Cup and are pre-qualified for the World Cup, did not enter).

Qualification took place over three rounds with a single repechage match between the second and third rounds;

- Round 1 was the 2024 Asia Rugby Men's Division 1 competition, the second tier of Asian men's international rugby. A single elimination tournament for four teams which saw the winner advancing to a repechage match at the beginning of round 3.
- Round 2 was the 2024 Asia Rugby Championship, which acted as a seeding round for the third round of the qualification process (the 2025 Asia Rugby Championship), with the top three teams following a round-robin competition, preserving their status in the top tier for Round 3 in 2025. The bottom placed team in Round 2 enters the pre-round 3 repechage match against the Round 1 winner; essentially a promotion/relegation play-off, with the winner progresses to the 2025 Asia Rugby Championship as the fourth seeded team in the final round of qualification, the loser is eliminated from World cup qualification.
- Round 3 was the 2025 Asia Rugby Championship, with the winner of a round-robin competition qualifying for the World Cup as Asia 1, and the runner-up (Asia 2) advancing to a play-off match against Africa 2 to decide who progresses to the Final Qualification Tournament.

== Entrants ==
Eight teams competed during the Asian qualifiers for the 2027 Men's Rugby World Cup, with Japan the only team qualified from the Region prior to the qualification process.

(Rankings as of first qualification match in this region)

Nation	Rank	Began play	Qualifying status
Hong Kong	22	1 June 2024	Qualified as Asia 1 on 5 July 2025
India	87	30 April 2024	Eliminated by Sri Lanka on 30 April 2024
Kazakhstan	64	30 April 2024	Eliminated by Sri Lanka on 4 May 2024
Malaysia	49	2 June 2024	Eliminated by Sri Lanka on 19 April 2025
Qatar	94	30 April 2024	Eliminated by Kazakhstan on 30 April 2024
South Korea	30	2 June 2024	Eliminated by Hong Kong on 5 July 2025
Sri Lanka	39	30 April 2024	Eliminated by Hong Kong on 22 June 2025
United Arab Emirates	61	1 June 2024	Advances to Asia / Africa play-off as Asia 2 on 5 July 2025

== Round 1: 2024 Asia Rugby Men's Division 1 ==
The 2024 Asia Rugby Men's Division 1 was contested between four teams in a knockout format.

The tournament was held in Colombo, Sri Lanka.

Sri Lanka won the competition and advanced to the round 3 repechage match, whilst India, Kazakhstan and Qatar were eliminated.

Semi-finals
Qatar	31
Kazakhstan	33
Sri Lanka	45
India	10

Final
Kazakhstan	7
Sri Lanka	45
3rd/4th Playoff Final
Qatar	34
India	25

=== Semi-Finals ===
30 April 2024
16:00 IST (UTC+05:30)

Qatar	31–33	Kazakhstan
Try: Penalty try 1' c Lotter 34' c Rakabu 40' c Bezuidenhout 53' c Con: Tremayne (3/3) 35', 40', 54'; Pen: Tremayne (1/2) 64'; Cards: Lotter (yellow card) 75'	Report	Try: Litvinov 4' c Petukhov 26' c Nazhibayev 45' m Chsherbakov 56' c Lymar 66' c Con: Nazhibayev (4/5) 4', 27', 57', 67'; Cards: Akymbeov (yellow card) 1'; Ivanov (yellow card) 37'

Colombo Racecourse, Sri Lanka
Attendance: 1,000
Referee: Ishanka Abeykoon (Sri Lanka)

30 April 2024
19:00 IST (UTC+05:30)

Sri Lanka	45–10	India
Try: Dissanayake (2) 15' c, 45' m Nanayakkara (2) 18' c, 55' c Ekanayake 33' c Ratwatte 74' c Sampath 80' c Con: Ratwatte (4/6) 16', 19', 34', 57'; Sampath (1/1) 80'; Cards: Madushanka (yellow card) 62'	Report	Try: P. Tanwar 63' c Con: Punia (1/1) 64'; Pen: Punia (1/1) 3'; Cards: Hansdah (yellow card) 40'

Colombo Racecourse, Sri Lanka
Attendance: 6,500
Referee: Just Wang (Singapore)

=== Third Place play-off ===
4 May 2024
16:00 IST (UTC+05:30)

Qatar	34–25	India
Try: Philips (2) 2' c, 68' m Lock 6' c Beracibi 13' c Rakabu 19' c Con: Rakabu (1/2) 3'; Tremayne (2/2) 7', 14'; Pen: Tremayne (1/1) 57'; Cards: Hughes (yellow card) 15'; Swart (yellow card) 74'	Report	Try: P. Tanwar 53' c V. Patil 76' c N. Khatri 79' m Con: Punia (2/3) 55', 77'; Pen: Punia (2/2) 5', 10'; Cards: S. Shukla (yellow card) 21'; Singh (yellow card) 56'

Colombo Racecourse, Sri Lanka
Attendance: 1,000
Referee: Ishanka Abeykoon (Sri Lanka)

=== Final ===
4 May 2024
19:00 IST (UTC+05:30)

Sri Lanka	45–7	Kazakhstan
Try: Doray 10' m Weerathunge 18' m Nanayakkara 24' c Ratwatte 31' c Ekanayake 36' c Jansen 41' c S. Silva 75' c Con: Ratwatte (4/6) 25', 32', 38', 42'; Sampath 76' (1/1); Cards: de Silva (yellow card) 61'	Report	Try: Magomedov 57' c Con: Nazhibayev (1/1) 58'; Cards: Imam (yellow card) 17'

Colombo Racecourse, Sri Lanka
Attendance: 20,000
Referee: James Fairbourne (UAE)

=== Final standings ===
Pos.	Team	Qualification
1	Sri Lanka	Advances to Round 3 repechage
2	Kazakhstan	Eliminated
3	Qatar	Eliminated
4	India	Eliminated

== Round 2: 2024 Asian Rugby Championship ==
The 2024 Asian Rugby Championship was contested between four teams in a round-robin format held over three rounds.

Malaysia finished bottom to see them drop down to the Round 3 repechage match against the winner of Round 1 (Sri Lanka), whilst the remaining three teams progressed to the third round.

Pos	Team	Pld	W	D	L	PF	PA	PD	B	Pts	Qualification
1	Hong Kong	3	3	0	0	189	18	+171	3	15	
2	United Arab Emirates	3	2	0	1	103	103	0	2	10	
3	South Korea	3	1	0	2	94	108	−14	3	7	
4	Malaysia	3	0	0	3	30	187	−157	0	0	Promotion/Relegation play-off

Rules for classification: Tiebreakers for teams tied on points: 1) Number of matches won; 2) Difference between points for and against; 3) Total number of points for; 4) Aggregate number of points scored in matches between tied teams; 5) Number of matches won excluding the first match, then the second and so on until the tie is settled.

=== Matches ===
1 June 2024
15:30 HKT (UTC+8)

(1 BP) Hong Kong	52–5	United Arab Emirates
Try: McCormick-Houston 16' c Laidler (2) 19' c, 23' m Hill (2) 33' c, 43' c Altier 48' c Post 74' c Higson-Smith 77' m Con: Hill (5/7) 17', 34', 45', 50', 76'; Sawyer (1/1) 20'; Cards: McCormick-Houston (yellow card) 50'	Report	Try: Vecanua 5' m

Hong Kong Football Club Stadium, Hong Kong
Attendance: 1,000
Referee: Katsuki Furuse (Japan)

2 June 2024
14:00 KST (UTC+9)

(1 BP) South Korea	55–5	Malaysia
Try: Jin Kyu (2) 7' m, 71' c Hyeon Je 14' c Jeong Wook (3) 24' c, 30' m, 39' c Yong Un 26' c Chan Ju 45' m Yeon Sik 66' m Con: Seung Jae (5/9) 15', 25', 27', 40', 72'	Report	Try: Amok 49' m

Incheon Namdong Asiad Rugby Field, Incheon
Attendance: 1,000
Referee: Jaco De Wit (UAE)

8 June 2024
14:00 MST (UTC+8)

Malaysia	6–70	Hong Kong (1 BP)
Pen: Chapman (2/2) 10', 56'; Cards: Amizan (yellow card) 17'	Report	Try: Post 7' c Penalty try 17'; Altier (2) 20' c, 33' c McNutt 21' c Hrstich (2) 36' c, 57' c Penesa 44' c Scott 67' c Pincott 69' c Con: Altier (7/7) 8', 22',24', 35', 36', 46', 59'; Avitabile (2/2) 68', 70'

UPM Stadium, Serdang
Attendance: 1,000
Referee: Justin Wang (Singapore)

9 June 2024
19:30 GST (UTC+04)

(1 BP) United Arab Emirates	36–32	South Korea (2 BP)
Try: Semple 10' c Galant; 45' m Gavin 50' m Davetawalu 64' c Con: Gavin (2/4) 11', 65'; Pen: Gavin (3/3) 3', 34', 60'; Drop: Gavin (1/1) 69'	Report	Try: Yong Un 7' c Jong Eun 18' m Jin Kyu 28' m Mun Jeong Ho 36' c Chan Deul 55' m Con: Seung Jae (2/5) 8', 37'; Pen: Seung Jae (1/3) 5'

The Sevens Stadium, Dubai
Attendance: 500
Referee: Matthew Rodden (Hong Kong)

21 June 2024
19:30 GST (UTC+04)

(1 BP) United Arab Emirates	62–19	Malaysia
Try: Oakeley (2) 2' m, 26' c Barnard 8' c McKee 13' c Vecanua (2) 33' c, 50' m Naisau (3) 40' c, 63' c, 79' m Walsh 75' m Con: Gavin (6/10) 9', 15', 27', 34', 40', 64'; Cards: Caldwell (yellow card) 16'; Galant (yellow card) 41'	Report	Try: Muzhaimey 17' c Isamil 22' m Preston 46' c Con: Champman (2/3) 18', 47'; Cards: Amizan (yellow card) 47'

The Sevens Stadium, Dubai
Attendance: 1,000
Referee: Morgan White (Hong Kong)

22 June 2024
16:30 HKT (UTC+8)

(1 BP) Hong Kong	67–7	South Korea
Try: Hill 3' c van der Smit (3) 23' c, 66' c, 69' c Altier 29' c Sayers 40' c Avitabile 48' m Hrstich 55' c McNutt 79' c Con: Altier (7/8) 4', 24', 31', 40', 56', 67', 70'; McNeish (1/1) 80'; Pen: Altier (2/2) 11', 15'; Cards: Avitabile (yellow card) 53'	Report	Try: Penalty try 53'

Hong Kong Football Club Stadium, Hong Kong
Attendance: 1,000
Referee: Takehito Namikawa (Japan)

== Round 3 repechage ==
Sri Lanka won the repechage match to progress through to the third round, whilst Malaysia were eliminated.

19 April 2025
16:00 SLST (UTC+5:30)

Sri Lanka	59–19	Malaysia
Try: Dilshan (2) 5' m, 59' c Ranjan 22' c Madushanka 32' c Ekanayake (3) 35' c, 46' c, 50' c Marasinghe 40' c Wickramarachchi 73' m Con: Zubair (7/9) 23', 33', 36', 40', 47', 51', 59'; Cards: Bandara (yellow card) 53'	Report	Try: Saukuru (3) 11' c, 57' c, 68' m Con: Kamsol (1/1) 12'; Fitri (1/2) 58'; Cards: Tamanisau (yellow card) 40'

Colombo Racecourse, Colombo
Referee: Jaco de Wit (UAE)

== Round 3: 2025 Asia Rugby Championship ==
The 2025 Asian Rugby Championship was contested between four teams in a round-robin format held over three rounds.

Hong Kong won the 2025 Asia Rugby Championship to qualify for the World Cup, whilst runners-up the Unite Arab Emirates advanced to the cross-regional play-offs. South Korea and Sri Lanka were eliminated.

Pos	Team	Pld	W	D	L	PF	PA	PD	TF	TA	TB	LB	Pts	Qualification
1	Hong Kong	3	3	0	0	191	39	+152	28	5	3	0	15	Qualifies as Asia 1
2	United Arab Emirates	3	2	0	1	77	100	−23	11	13	2	0	10	Advances to Asia/Africa play-off match
3	South Korea	3	1	0	2	96	142	−46	14	21	2	1	7	
4	Sri Lanka	3	0	0	3	62	145	−83	8	22	1	1	2	

Rules for classification: Tiebreakers for teams tied on points: 1) Number of matches won; 2) Difference between points for and against; 3) Total number of points for; 4) Aggregate number of points scored in matches between tied teams; 5) Number of matches won excluding the first match, then the second and so on until the tie is settled.

=== Matches ===
13 June 2025
16:00 SLST (UTC+5:30)

(2 BP) Sri Lanka	34–38	South Korea (1 BP)
Try: Zubair 15' c Bandara 40' c Thilakaratne 41' c Jansen 45' m Ekanayake 76' m Con: Ratwatte (3/5) 16', 40', 41'; Pen: Ratwatte (1/1) 20'; Cards: Jansen (yellow card) 70'	Report; WR details	Try: Jeong Min 5' c Ok Gi 37' c Nam Uk 47' c Seok Hwan 54' m Yeon Sik 61' m Penalty try 70'; Con: Hyun Goo (3/5) 6', 38', 48'

Colombo Racecourse, Colombo
Attendance: 2,000
Referee: JP Clements (UAE)

14 June 2025
19:30 GST (UTC+04)

United Arab Emirates	10–43	Hong Kong (1 BP)
Try: Janes 20' c Con: Johnson (1/1) 21'; Pen: Johnson (1/1 31'; Cards: Guerin (yellow card) 61'	Report; WR details	Try: Post 13' c Denmark 25' m Chapman 37' c Worley 47' c Penalty try 61'; Scott 73' c Con: De Thierry (4/5) 14', 39', 48', 74'; Pen: De Thierry (1/) 4'; Cards: Hrstich (yellow card) 66'

The Sevens Stadium, Dubai
Attendance: 500
Referee: Katsuki Furuse (Japan)

21 June 2025
15:00 KST (UTC+9)

(2 BP) South Korea	36–38	United Arab Emirates (1 BP)
Try: Penalty try 27'; Jae Jun 32' c In Bum 35' c Jun Young 41' m Hyun Soo 45' c Con: Hyun Goo (3/4) 33', 36', 46'; Pen: Hyun Goo (1/1) 64'	Report; WR details	Try: Sejean 10' c Volavola (3) 20' c, 69' c, 72' m Stapley 40' c Janes 58' m Con: Johnson (4/6) 11', 20', 40', 70'; Cards: Barnard (yellow card) 27'

Incheon Namdong Asiad Rugby Field, Incheon
Attendance: 500
Referee: Morgan White (Hong Kong)

22 June 2025
16:30 HKT (UTC+8)

(1 BP) Hong Kong	78–7	Sri Lanka
Try: Scott 11' c van der Smith (3) 16' c, 63' c, 77' m Worley (3) 19' m, 55' c, 80' c Hrstich 23' c Altier (2) 30' c, 43' m MacKinlay-West 67' c Sayers 70' c Con: De Thierry (2/3) 11', 16'; Altier (7/8) 14', 30', 56', 64', 67', 71', 80'	Report; WR details	Try: Bandara 38' c Con: Ratwatte (1/1) 39'

Kai Tak Youth Sports Ground, Kowloon
Attendance: 1,500
Referee: Jaco De Wit (UAE)

4 July 2025
16:00 SLST (UTC+5:30)

Sri Lanka	21–29	United Arab Emirates (1 BP)
Try: Rifan 19' c Karunathilake 43' m Con: Ratwatte (1/2) 20'; Pen: Ratwatte (3/3) 11', 23', 40'; Cards: Gamage (yellow card) 65'	Report; WR details	Try: Stapley (2) 6' c, 72' c Janes 13' m Naisau 38' c Con: Johnson (3/4) 7', 40', 73'; Pen: Johnson (1/1) 30'; Cards: Semple (yellow card) 60'

Colombo Racecourse, Colombo
Attendance: 1,000
Referee: Craig Chan (Hong Kong)

5 July 2025
15:00 KST (UTC+9)

South Korea	22–70	Hong Kong (1 BP)
Try: Yong Heung (2) 57' c, 64' c In Bum 68' m Con: Jeong Wook (2/3) 58', 65'; Pen: Jeong Wook (1/1) 15'; Cards: Nam Uk (yellow card) 20'; Yeon Sik (yellow card) 77'	Report; WR details	Try: Worley 2' c Post (2) 13' c, 28' c Hrstich (2) 21' c, 54' c Altier 24' c Sawye 40' c Sayers 45' c Denmark 61' c van der Smith 78' c Con: De Thierry (9/9) 3', 14', 21', 25', 29', 40', 46', 55', 62'; Altier (1/1) 79'; Cards: Axten-Burrett (red card) 37'

Incheon Namdong Asiad Rugby Field, Incheon
Attendance: 1,000
Referee: Ibuki Tetsuka (Japan)

Notes:

- With this result, Hong Kong qualified for the World Cup for the first time, and the United Arab Emirates advanced through to the play-offs for the first time.
