= Hisham Abdeen =

Sri Lankan rugby sevens player

Hisham Abdeen is a former Sri Lankan rugby sevens and rugby union player who played as a flanker in his playing career.

== Domestic career ==
His sporting career began in Zahira College, Maradana where he took multiple sports including football, rugby, cricket and athletics. He captained Zahira College's association football team in 1979, in effectively his last year with the college. He was also a member of the Zahira College's cricket team from 1977 to 1979. He later switched to Isipathana College and continued to ply his trade in both cricket and football. He made his mark in rugby at Isipathana College, where he endured a golden run in the 1980 school's rugby season, scoring 25 tries.

He represented the Havelock Sports Club from 1979 to 1988 at the Sri Lanka Rugby Championship and he had a brief captaincy stint with the Havelock Sports Club in 1983 rugby season. He then switched his allegiance for Colombo Hockey and Football Club in 1990 and stayed with the club until 1994.

== International career ==
He represented Sri Lanka at the 1980 ARFU Asian Rugby Championship, 1982 ARFU Asian Rugby Championship and 1986 ARFU Asian Rugby Championship. He was picked for Sri Lanka 7's team for the 1980 Hong Kong Sevens while he was still a schoolboy, and he became the first schoolboy to represent Sri Lanka in international rugby.

He captained Sri Lankan Tuskers side which won the Bowl Championship defeating Thailand in the Bowl final of the 1984 Hong Kong Sevens. Under his captaincy, Sri Lanka emerged as runners-up in Bowl Championships at the 1986 Hong Kong Sevens and at the 1987 Hong Kong Sevens. He was named as the captain of the President's XV against Paris University at Westminster England during a friendly tour of Wales in 1987. He also captained Sri Lanka at the 1987 World Cup Sevens held in Sydney. He captained Sri Lankan rugby union team at the 1988 ARFU Asian Rugby Championship. He was retained as the skipper of Sri Lankan rugby sevens side at the 1988 Dubai Sevens. He also led Sri Lanka Tuskers at the 1993 Singapore Sevens and 1993 Hong Kong Sevens.

== Post-playing career ==
He pursued his interests in coaching after his retirement from playing rugby. He coached Ananda College in his first coaching stint and under his guidance, Ananda College won the all-Island U-17 rugby tournament in 2002.

He was appointed as a national selector in 2000. He was also appointed as the national head coach for the national rugby sevens squad in 2004 and in his first year as coach of the national rugby sevens side, he tasted success with the side having won the Plate Championship of the 2004 Singer Sri Lankan Airlines Rugby 7s. He also coached the Sri Lanka women's national rugby sevens team from 2003 to 2008.

In 2020, he received honorary life member status from Sri Lanka Rugby fraternity.
