= Mong Kok Stadium =

Stadium in Hong Kong

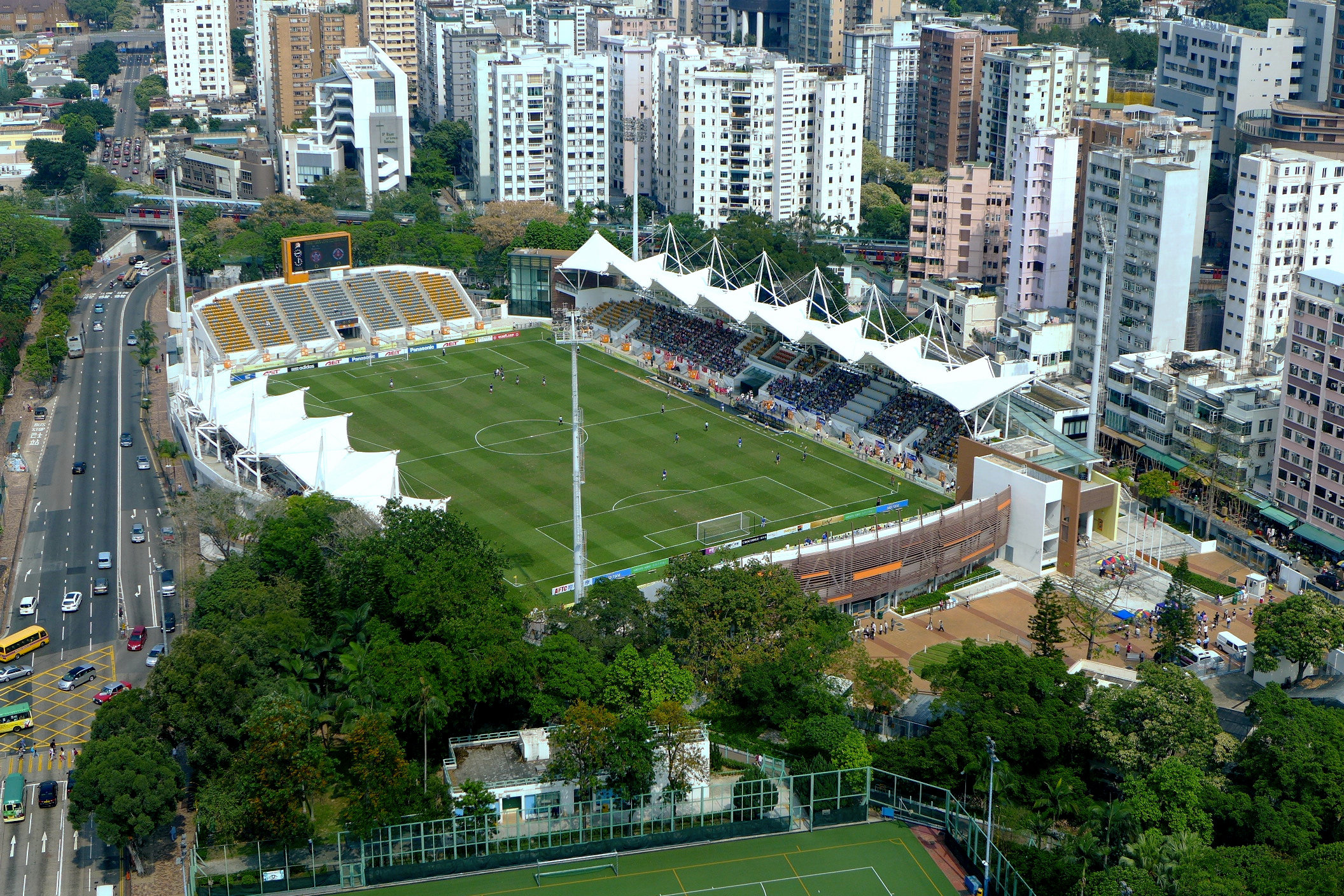
- Mong Kok Stadium in April 2015
- Interactive map of Mong Kok Stadium
- Former names: Army Sports Ground (Before 1961), Municipal Stadium (1961–1973)
- Location: 37 Flower Market Road, Mong Kok, Kowloon, Hong Kong, China
- Coordinates: 22.326°N 114.1728°E
- Owner: Leisure and Cultural Services Department
- Operator: Leisure and Cultural Services Department
- Capacity: 6,664
- Surface: Grass
- Pitch size: 105 x 65 meters (115 x 71 yards)
- Public transit: Prince Edward station Exit B1

Construction
- Opened: 1961; 65 years ago
- Renovated: 2011; 15 years ago

Tenants
- Hong Kong National Team (2011–); Kitchee (2013–2025); Eastern (2015–2018, 2020–); Lee Man (2025–); Citizen (2005–2013); Sun Hei (2011–2013); Pegasus (2013–2014, 2018–2019); Southern (2019–2020)

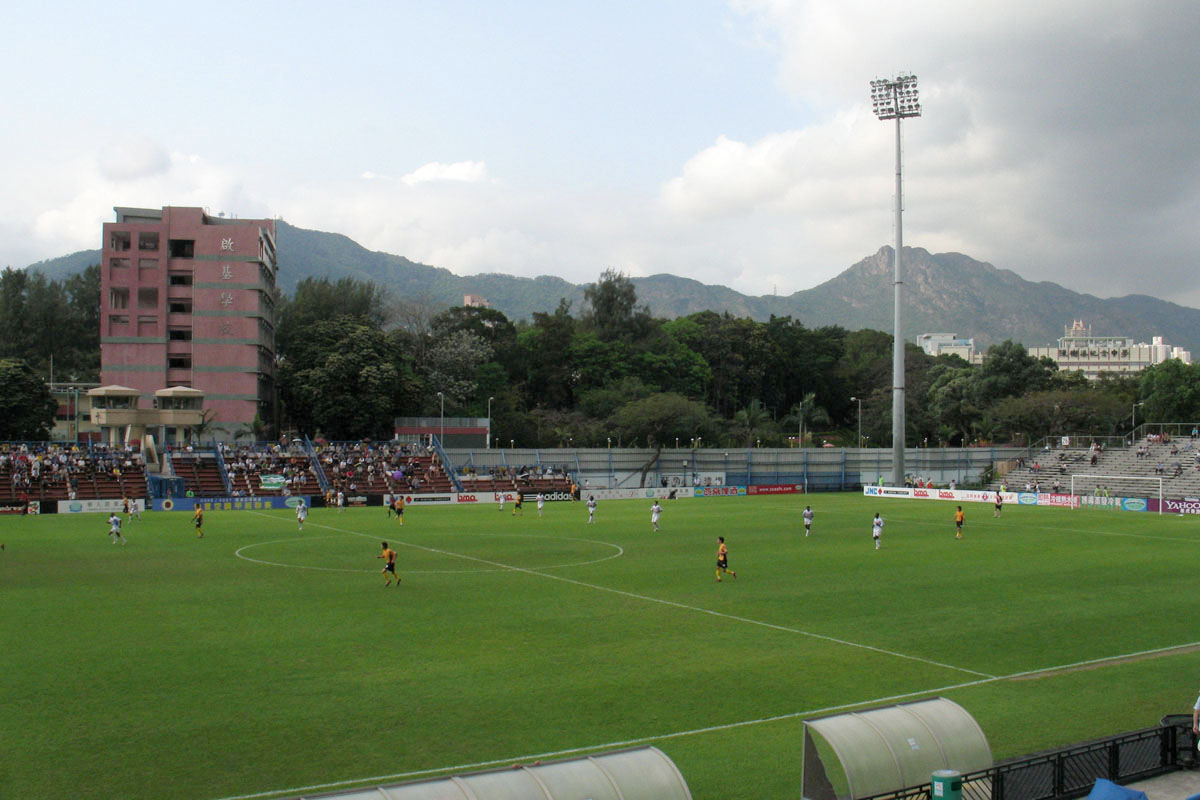
Mong Kok Stadium before its 2011 renovation

Mong Kok Stadium (Chinese: 旺角大球場) is a stadium in Mong Kok, Kowloon, Hong Kong. With a capacity of 6,664 (comprising four stands of 1,666), it hosts Hong Kong Premier League football matches, with Kitchee currently using the venue. The stadium is run by the Leisure and Cultural Services Department of Hong Kong.

== History ==
The stadium was known as the Army Sports Ground before it was taken over by the Urban Council in 1961.

=== Pre-renovation ===
On 15 April 2007, South China played to a 1–1 draw with Kitchee in the penultimate game of the Hong Kong Football League season at Mong Kok Stadium. The game attracted a full house of over 8,500 spectators, the first full house for 11 years for a Hong Kong League game at Mong Kok Stadium.

On 22 March 2013, Hong Kong hosted Vietnam in the 2015 AFC Asian Cup qualification phase. The game attracted 6,639 spectators, the first full-house after the renovation of the stadium. Hong Kong came to a late victory by a header from captain Chan Wai Ho in the 87th minute.

On 17 November 2015, Hong Kong played against China PR in the 2018 FIFA World Cup qualification – AFC second round, where there was another full house and Hong Kong drew 0–0.

In the 2017 AFC Champions League, all 3 of Eastern SC matches were sold out.

In May 2017, Eastern SC and Kitchee SC played the deciding match of the 2016–17 Hong Kong Premier League in which Kitchee won 4–1.

In the 2018 AFC Champions League, Kitchee SC played Tianjin Quanjian in front of a full house at Mong Kok Stadium.

=== Renovation ===
From Autumn 2009, Mong Kok Stadium underwent a series of modifications, including the addition of a roof, close-circuit televisions, refurbishment of the seats, better lighting, refurbishment of the changing rooms, adding a press room and doping rooms, while the stadium's capacity will be reduced to 6,680. Three First Division clubs - Citizen, Fourway Rangers and Sun Hei - have asked to use the stadium as their home ground. But it is believed that the owner of the facility, the Leisure and Cultural Services Department, has reservations over the number of clubs using it. Vincent Yuen Man-chuen, general secretary of the HKFA, said they had submitted a proposal to use the stadium as the home ground for three clubs. "We are in the process of negotiation with the government," said Yuen. "There were more than a hundred matches a season held [there] before, but the number can be reduced to half if three teams use it for their home matches plus some major cup competitions." There is currently doubt that the new Mong Kok Stadium will be ready for use in October.

=== 2011 re-opening ===
On 16 October 2011, the renovated Mong Kok Stadium re-opened. The first match was a Hong Kong First Division match between Sun Hei and Sham Shui Po SA. 4,499 fans attended the game. Sun Hei won the game 5–0, Sun Hei players Cheng Siu Wai scored the goal while Barry was the first player to score a hat-trick after renovation.

=== 2011 Official Re-opening ceremony and international football match ===
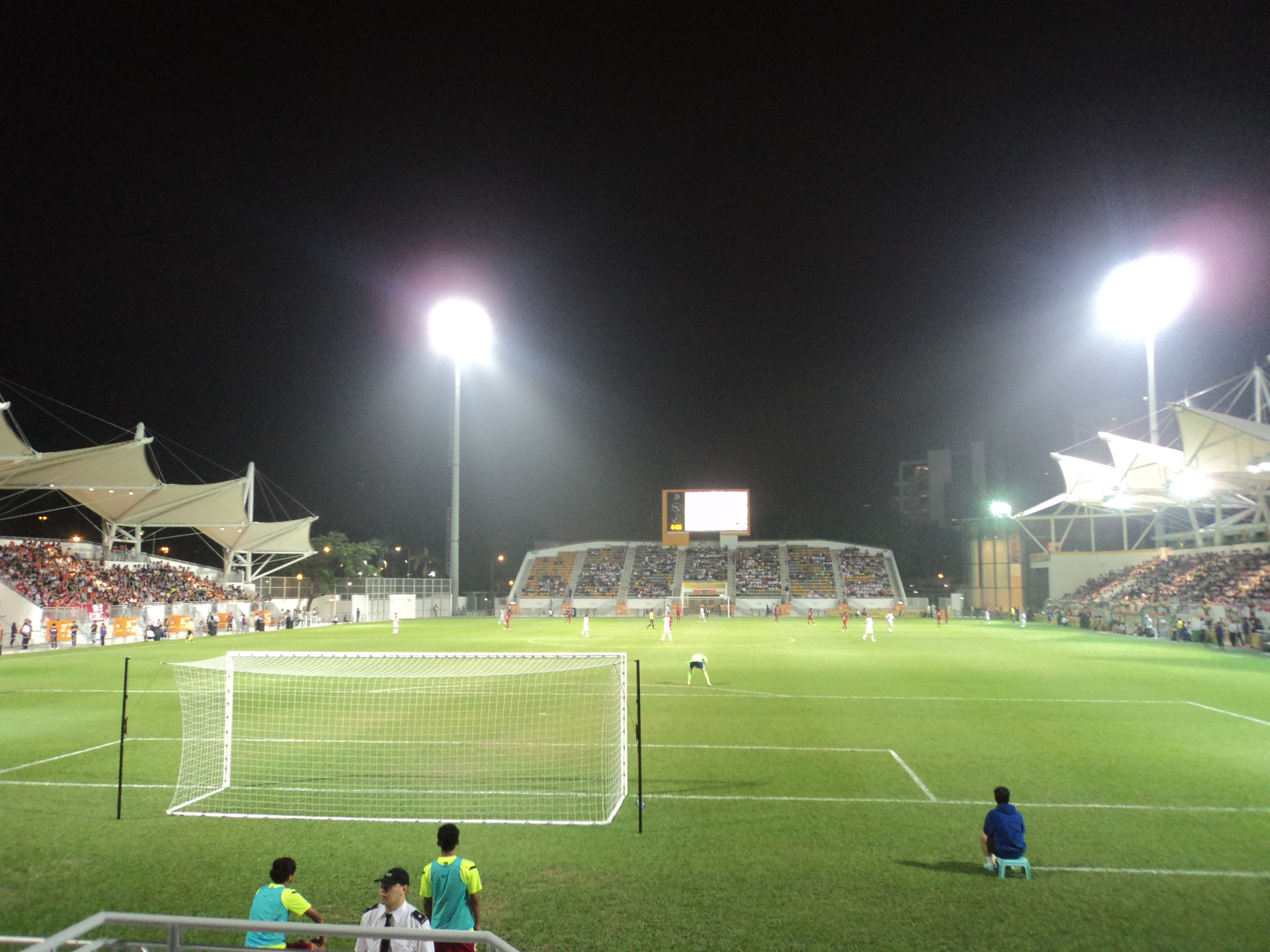
New Main grandstand.

The Secretary for Home Affairs, Mr Tsang Tak-sing attended Mong Kok Stadium's official re-opening ceremony. To celebrate the re-opening of the stadium, the Leisure and Cultural Services Department organised a ceremony for 15 November 2011 and invited the Russian National Youth Team for a friendly football match with the Hong Kong Youth Representative Team. A sport towel, a limited edition souvenir specially produced to celebrate the re-opening of the stadium, was distributed to each attendee to make this meaningful day more memorable. There were also performances including rhythmic drumming with flag waving, and wushu and a lion dance, showing a unique Chinese flavour. The ceremony also featured impressive performances by cheering teams and the Hong Kong Police Band.

== Facilities and structures ==
- International Standard Natural Grass Pitch with 1200 Lux Floodlight
- Coloured Display LED scoreboard, 9.28m wide X 5.76m high.
- 6,600 spectator seats
- 127 VIP seats
- 42 wheelchair seats
- 1 VIP room (accommodates 32)
- Police Control Tower
- Broadcasting Tower
- 27 parking spaces
- 12 public toilets
- 8 disabled toilets
- 8 entrance turnstiles/ticket counters
- 4 teams' changing rooms
- 2 referees' changing rooms
- 1 VIP room
- 1 disabled washroom
- 1 fast food kiosk
- 1 press room
- 1 baby care room
- 1 anti-doping room
- International Standard Natural Grass Pitch with 1200 Lux Floodlight
- Coloured Display LED scoreboard, 9.28m wide X 5.76m high.
- 6,600 spectator seats
- 127 VIP seats
- 42 wheelchair seats
- 1 VIP room (accommodates 32)
- Police Control Tower
- Broadcasting Tower
- 27 parking spaces
- 12 public toilets
- 8 disabled toilets
- 8 entrance turnstiles/ticket counters
- 4 teams' changing rooms
- 2 referees' changing rooms
- 1 VIP room
- 1 disabled washroom
- 1 fast food kiosk
- 1 press room
- 1 baby care room
- 1 anti-doping room

== Transport ==
It is accessible from the Prince Edward station of the MTR on the Tsuen Wan and the Kwun Tong lines. It is also near Mong Kok East station on the East Rail line.

== Sporting events ==
- 2004, 2006–07 ARFU Asian Rugby Championship
- 2026 FIFA ASEAN Cup

== Tournament results ==
=== Rugby ===
==== Asian 5 Nations Rugby Tournament plan ====
Hong Kong Rugby Football Union chairman Trevor Gregory said he was exploring the possibility of using the stadium to host HSBC Asian Five Nations (A5N) home games. Hong Kong played both their A5N rugby games in front of full houses at the 2,500-capacity Hong Kong Football Club Stadium this season. A move to Mong Kok, with its new capacity of 6,650, appeals, admitted HKRFU's Gregory. "Our initial thoughts are to play our international fixtures in the A5N at Mong Kok Stadium. At the moment we have no plans to hold any domestic games there," Gregory said. On 26 May 2012, Hong Kong blitzed Kazakhstan 55–0 to claim third place in the 2012 HSBC Asian Five Nations Top Five competition. It was Hong Kong's first international in 13 years at the newly renovated Mong Kok Stadium.

==== Super Rugby ====
Hong Kong hosted its first Super Rugby fixture on 19 May 2018. The Japanese outfit, the Sunwolves, playing a home game at Mong Kok, defeated the Stormers from Cape Town, South Africa, by 26–23.

=== 2026 FIFA ASEAN Cup ===
Date	Time (UTC+8)	Team #1	Res.	Team #2	Round	Attendance
24 September 2026	16:00	Laos	3–1	Brunei	Group B	250
24 September 2026	20:00	Myanmar	2–0	Timor-Leste	Group B	250

== See also ==
- Mong Kok, the area where the stadium is situated

== Gallery ==
=== Before renovation ===
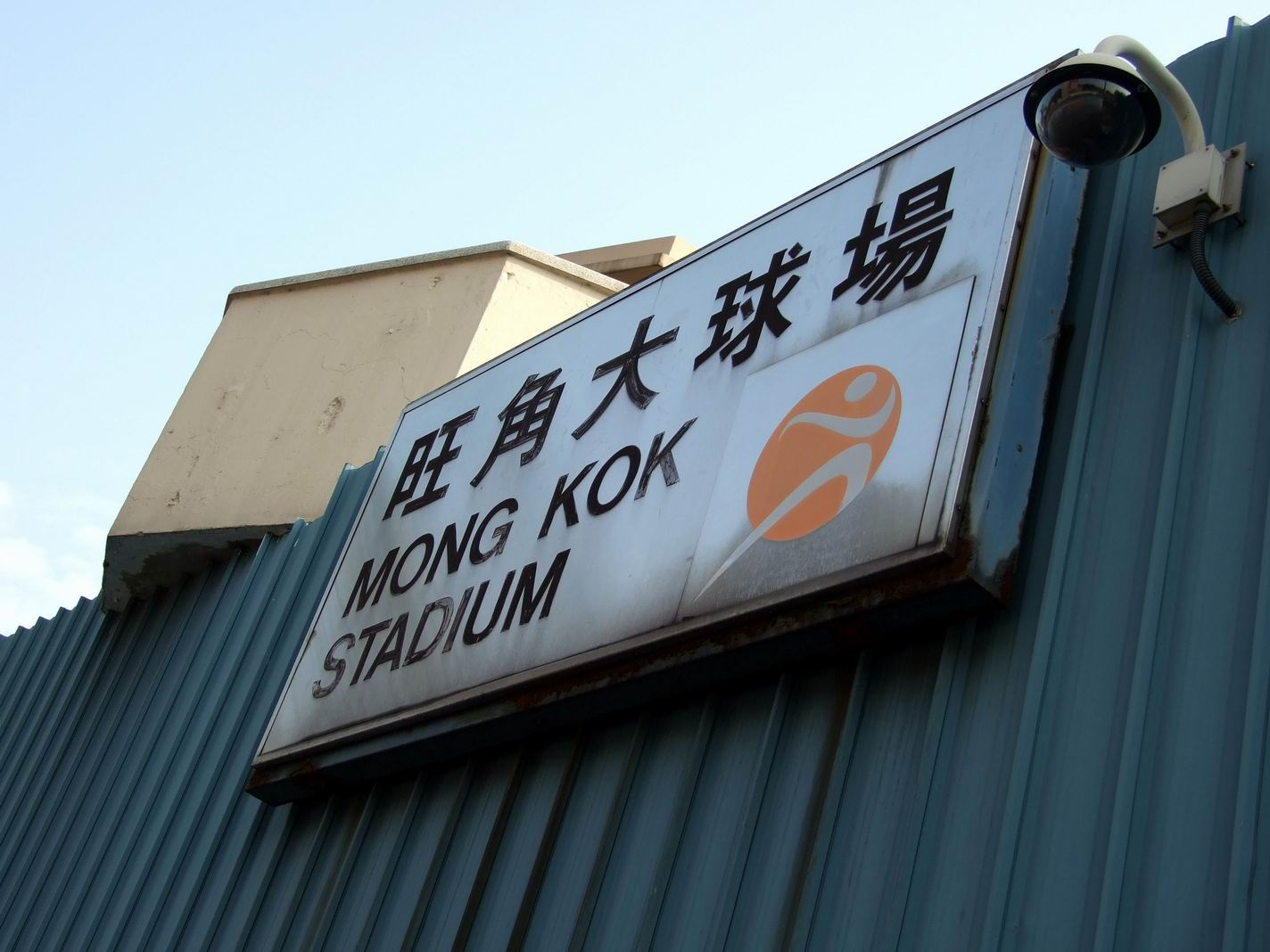
Stadium sign

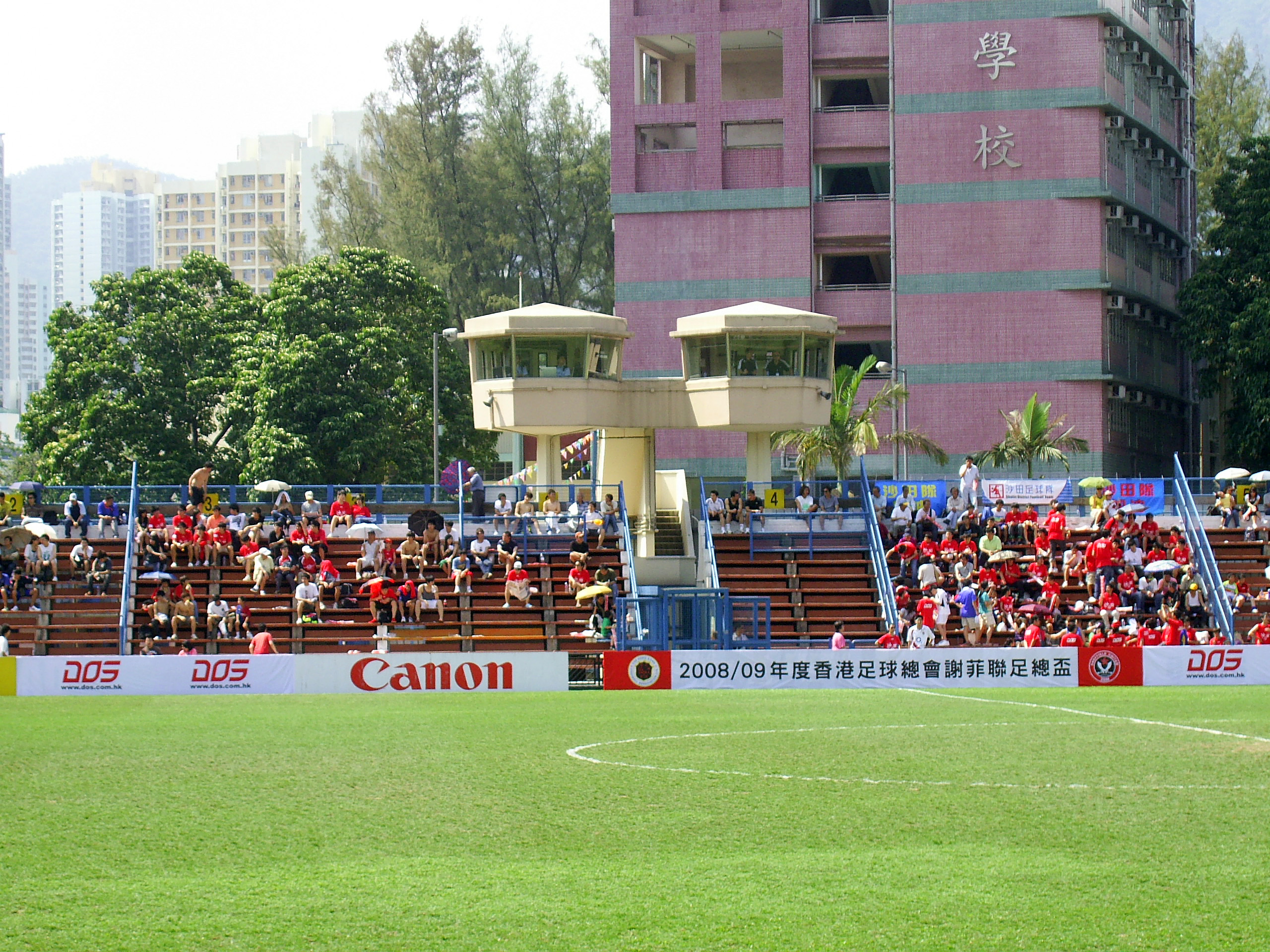
Police Control Tower and Broadcast Tower

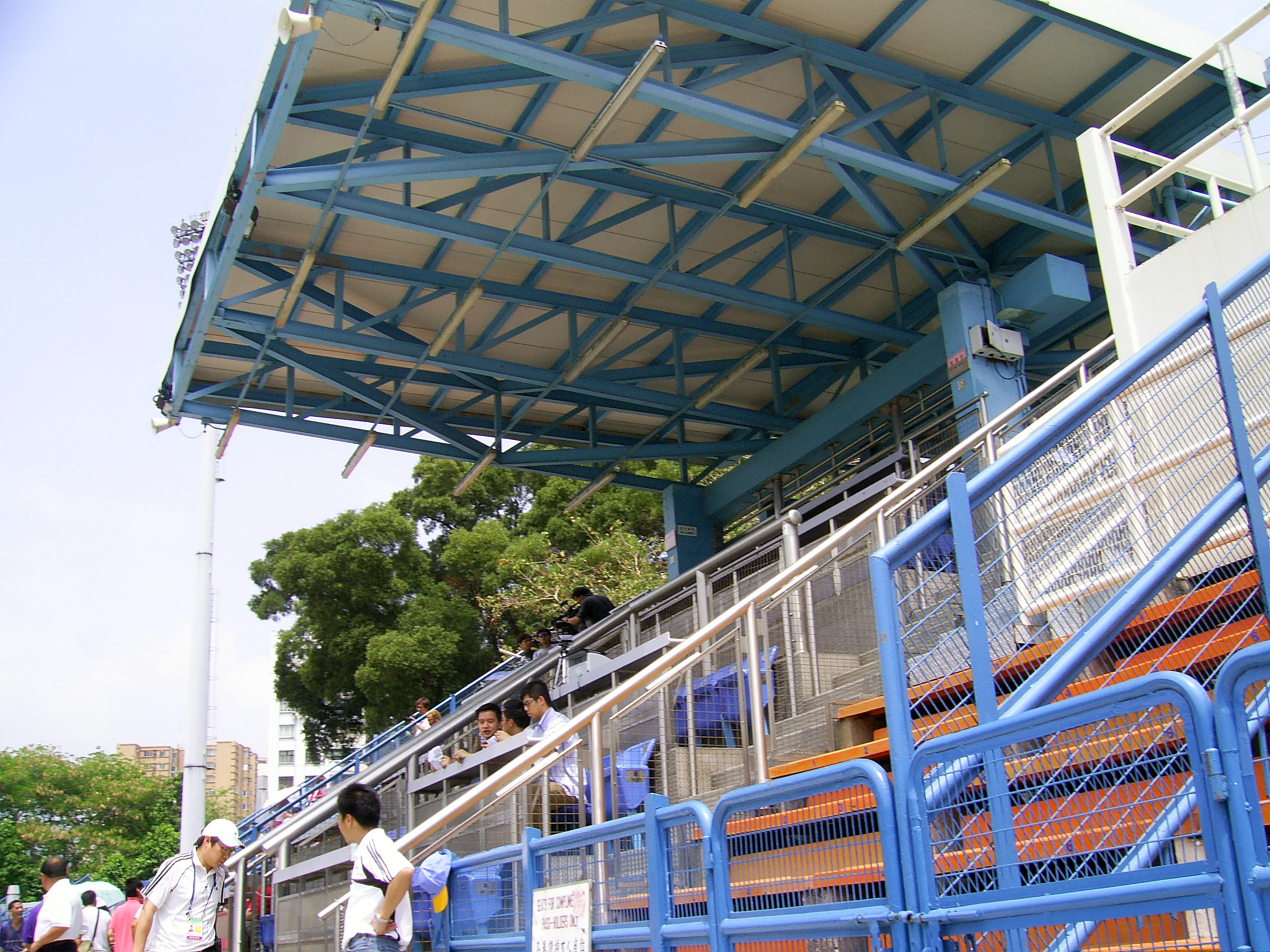
VIP section

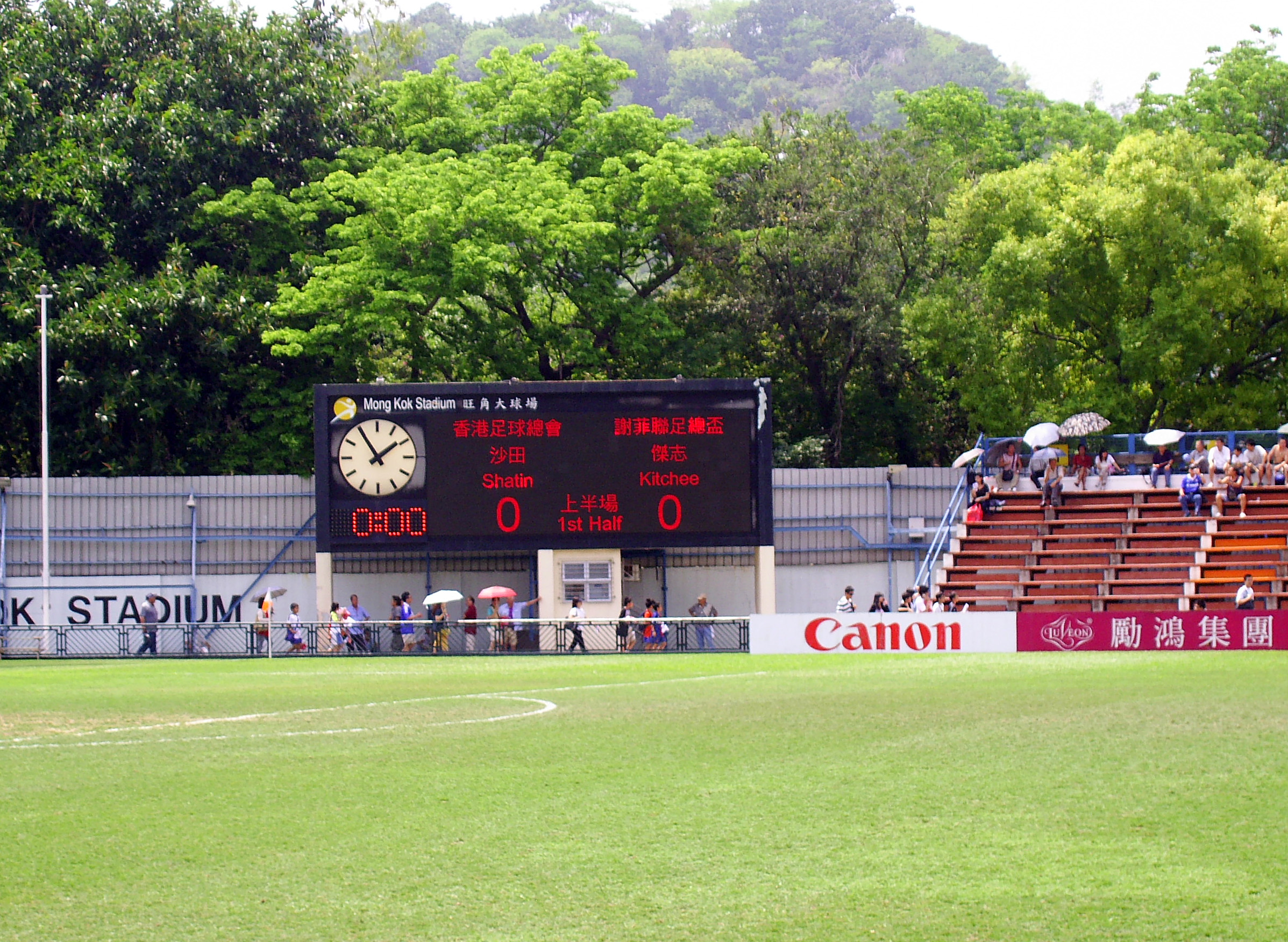
Electronic Scoreboard

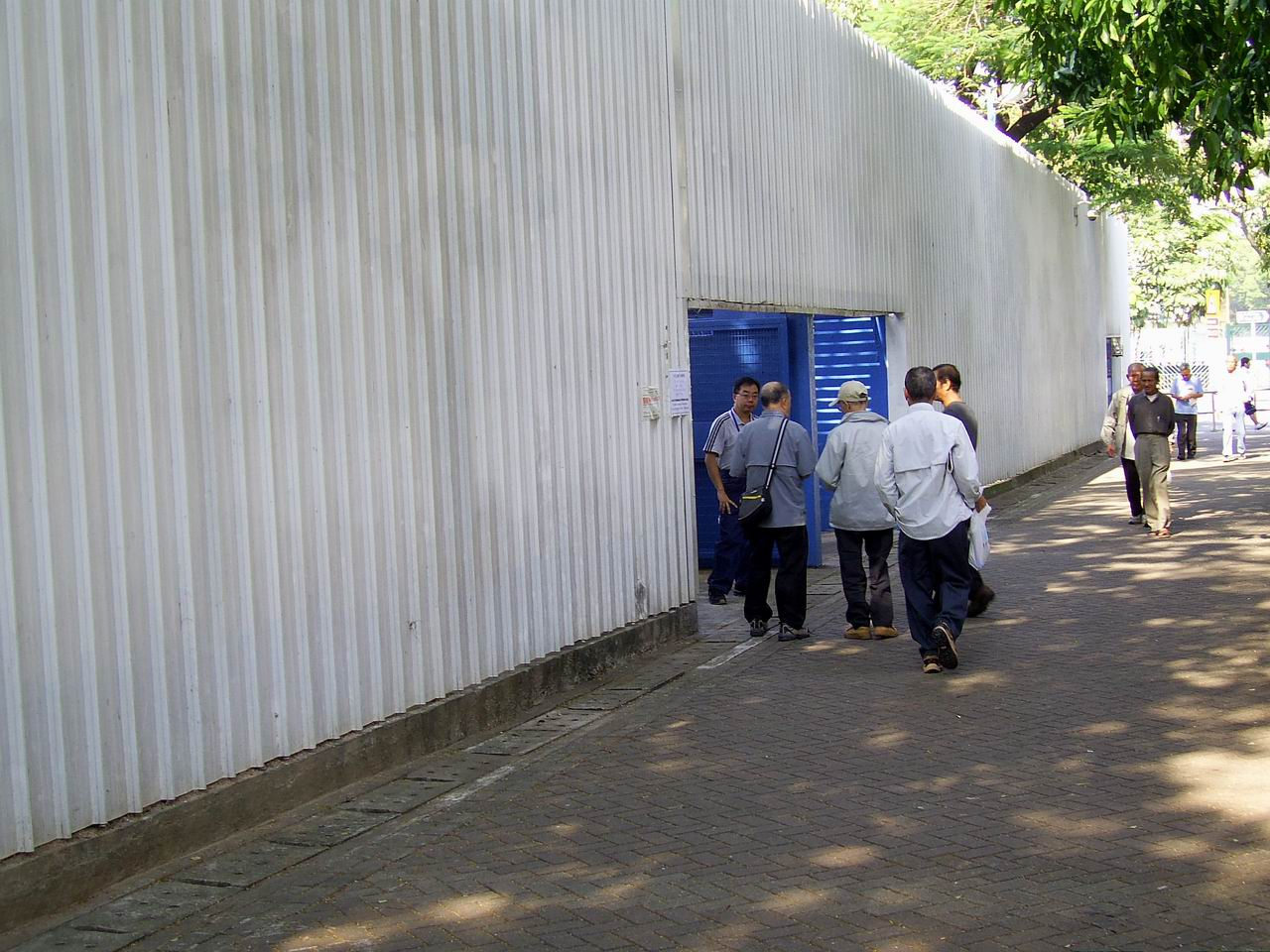
Bird Garden Entrance

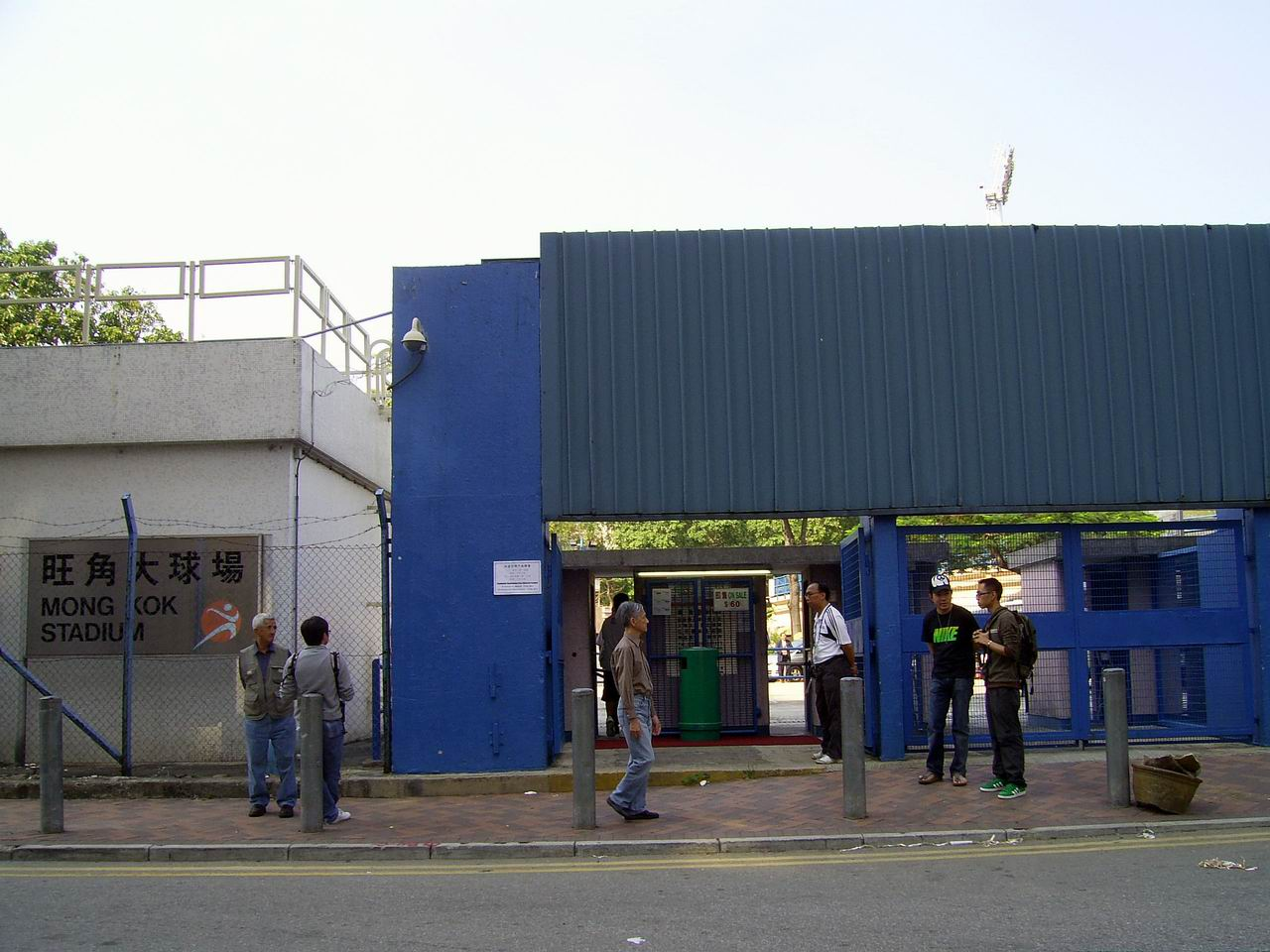
Flower Market Road Entrance

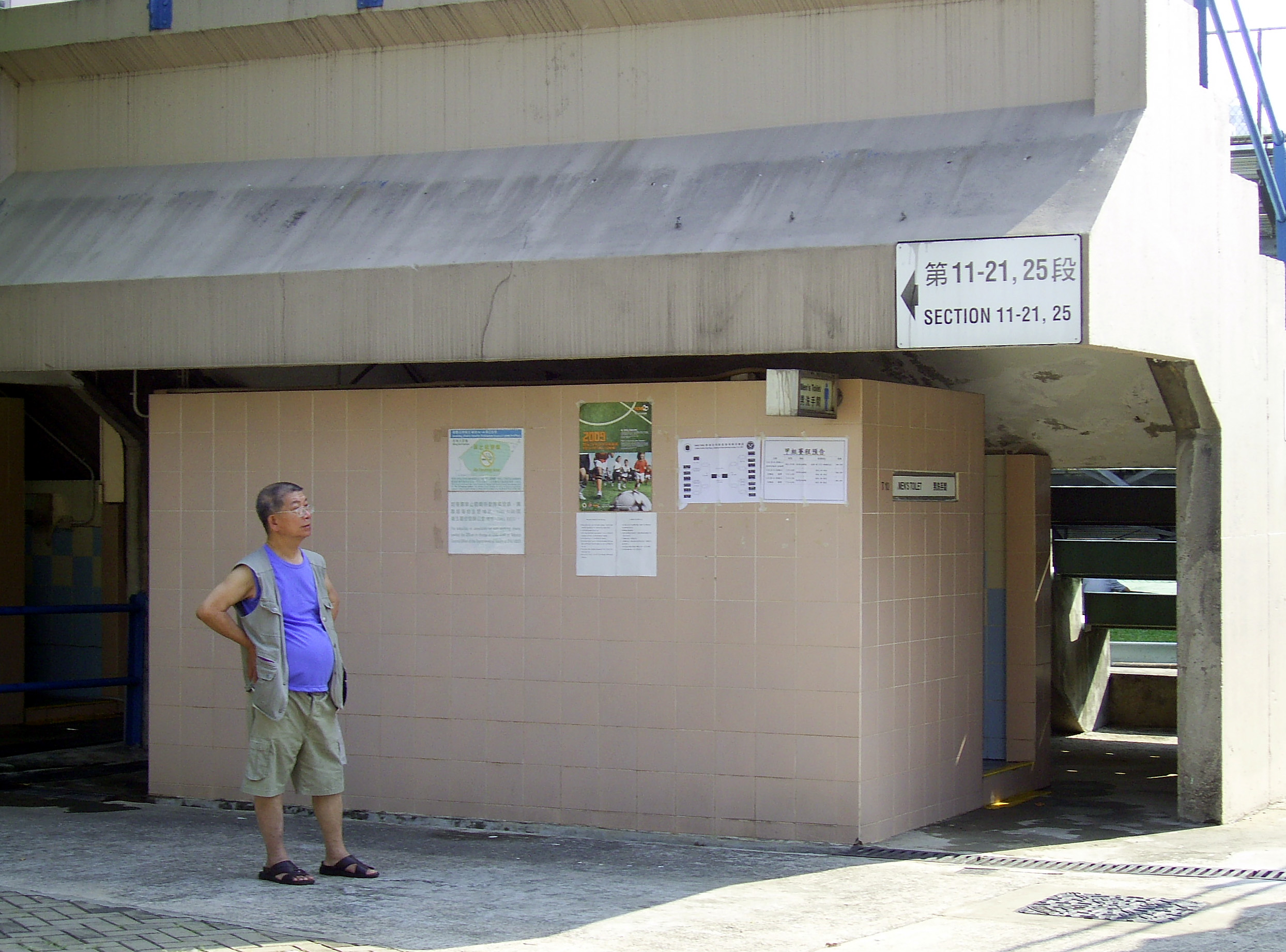
Toilet

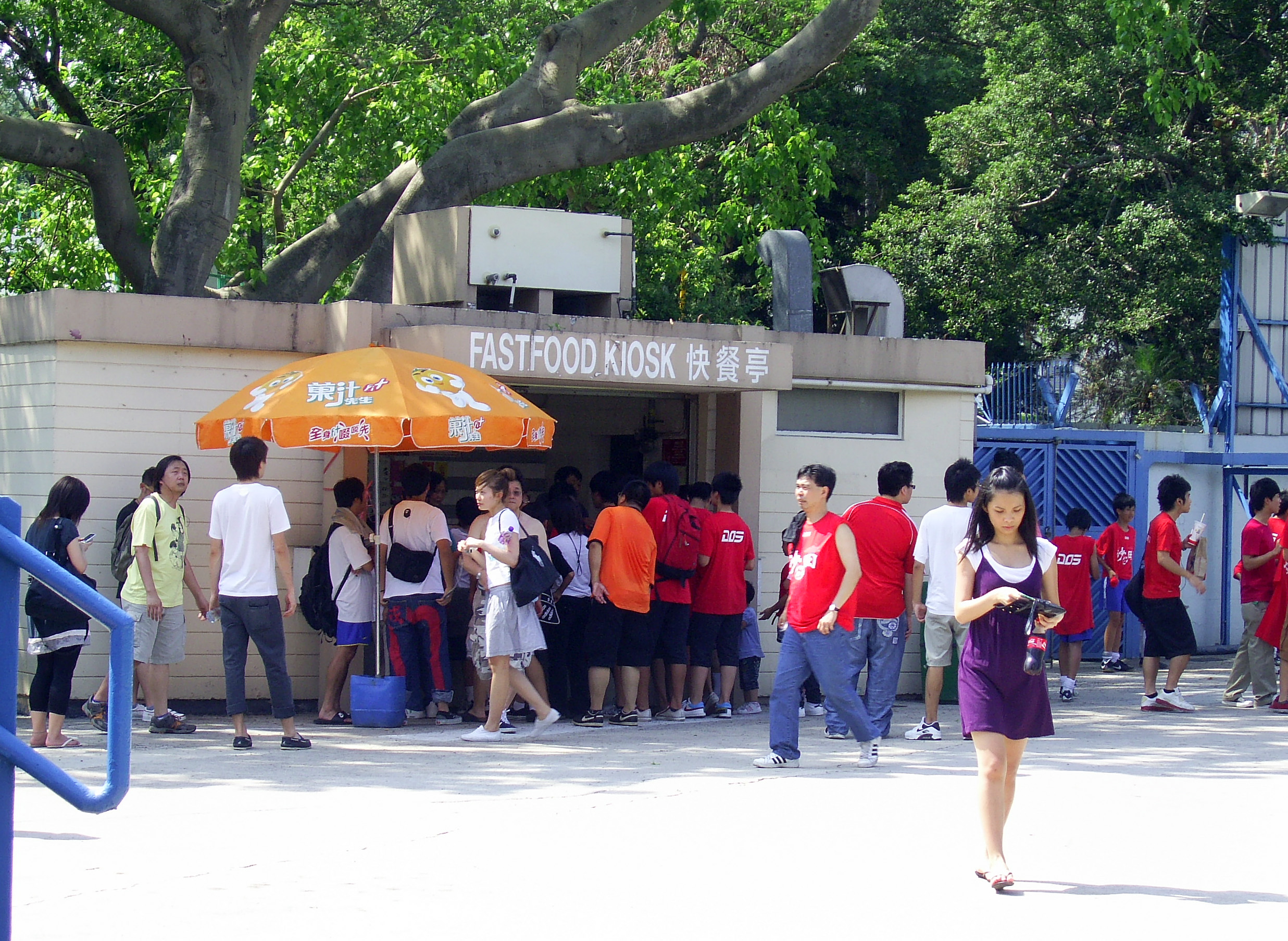
Fast Food Kiosk

=== After renovation ===
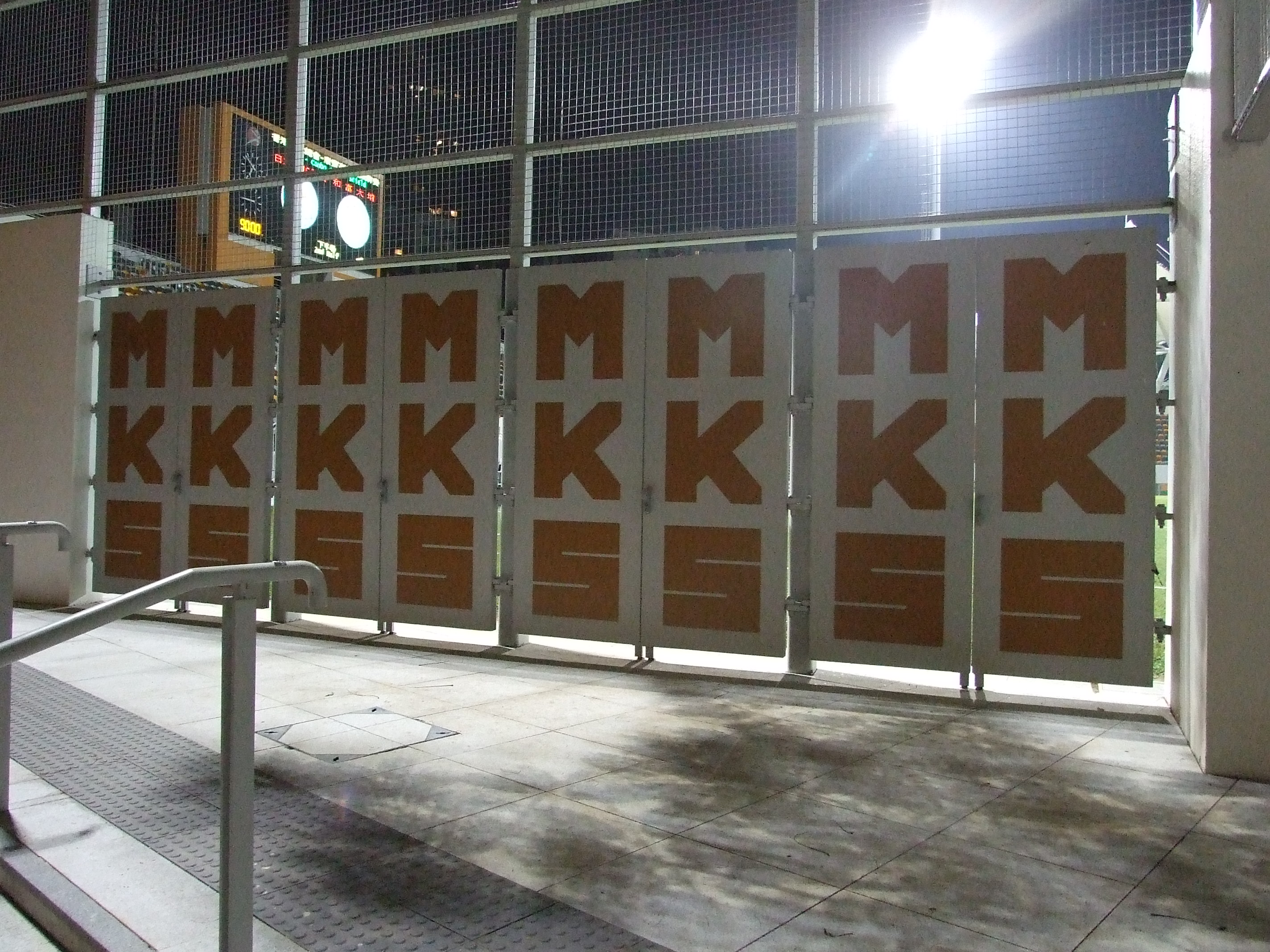
Sign outside the stadium

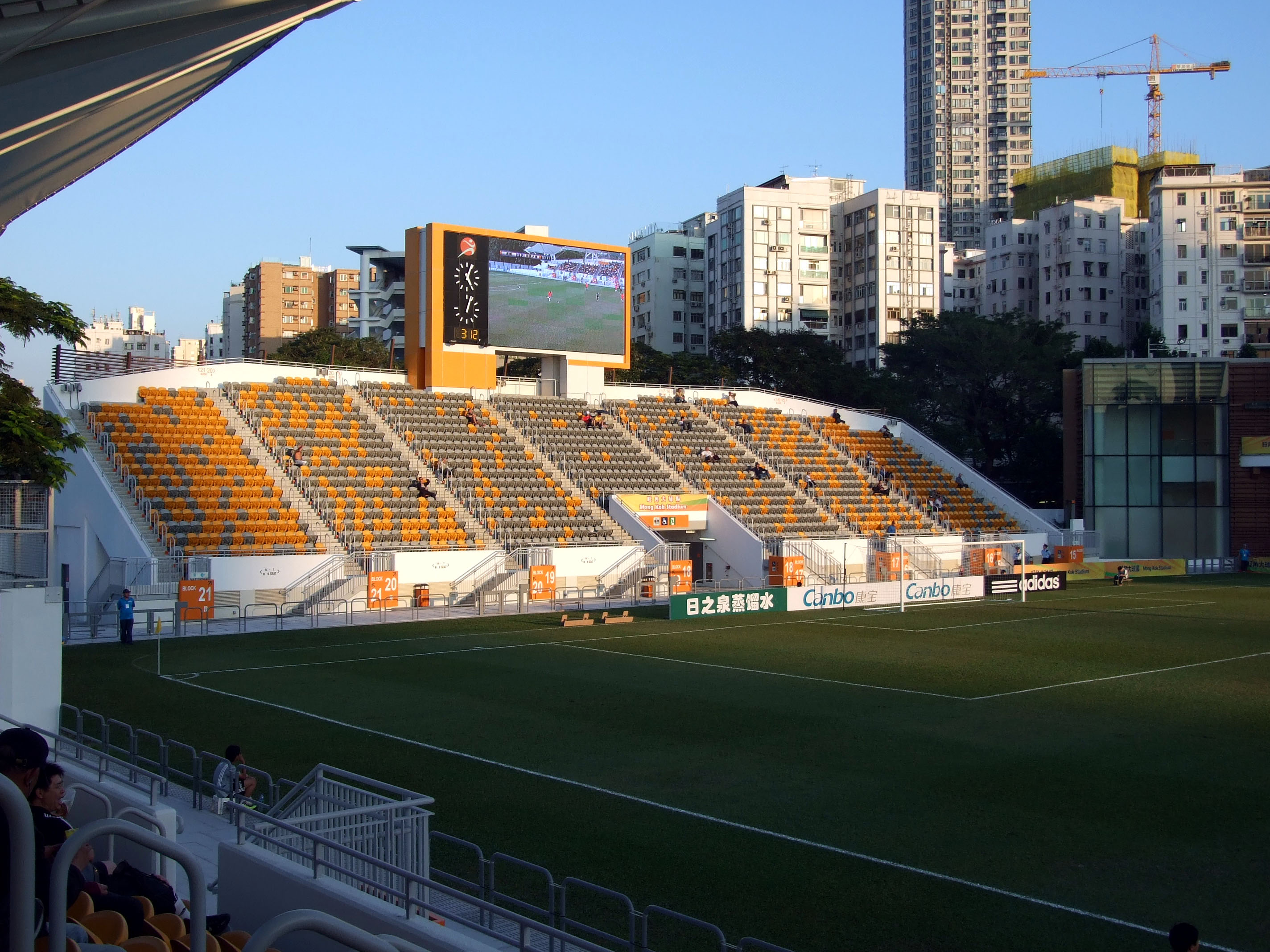
Grandstand with electronic scoreboard

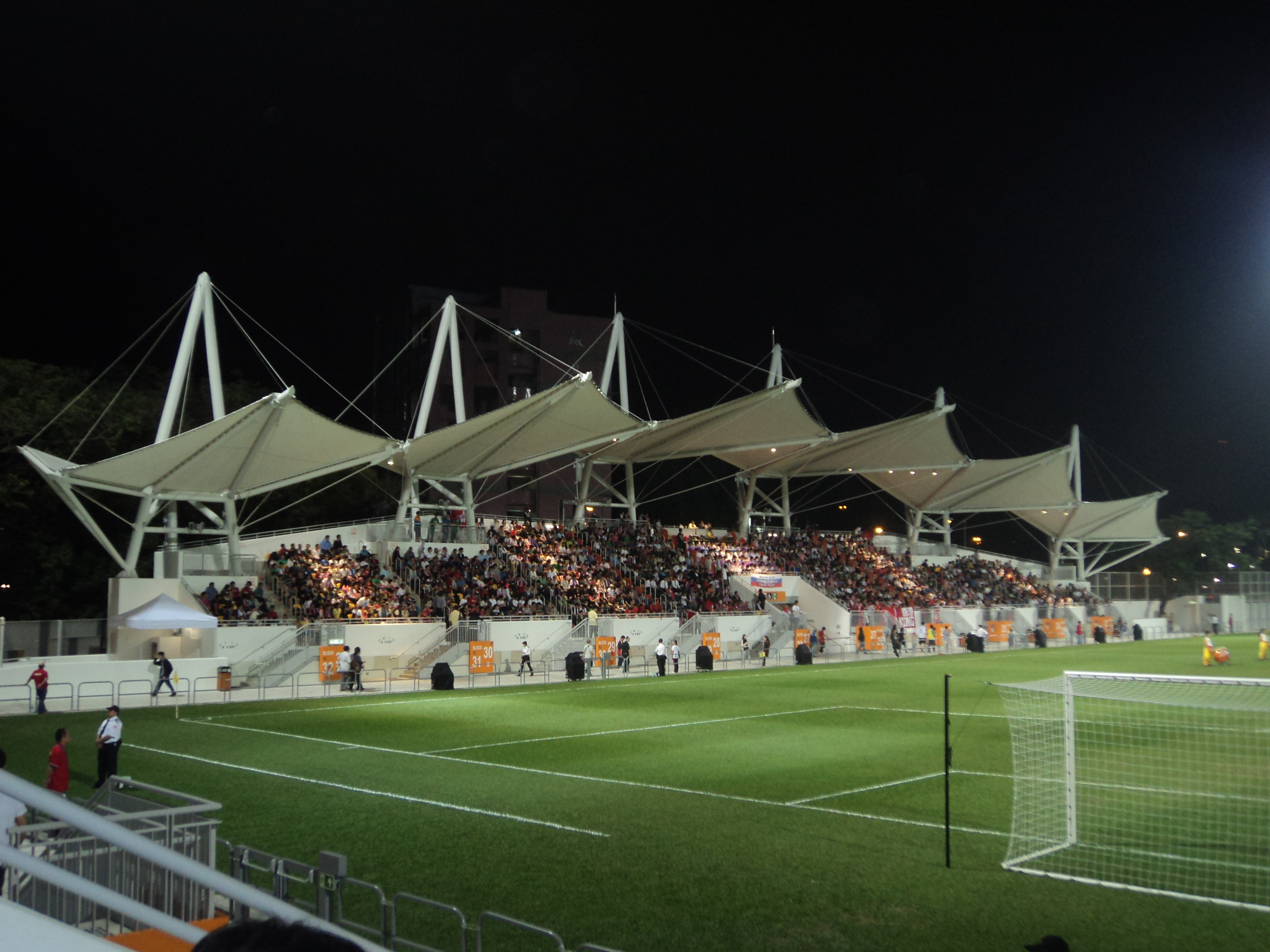
Main grandstand

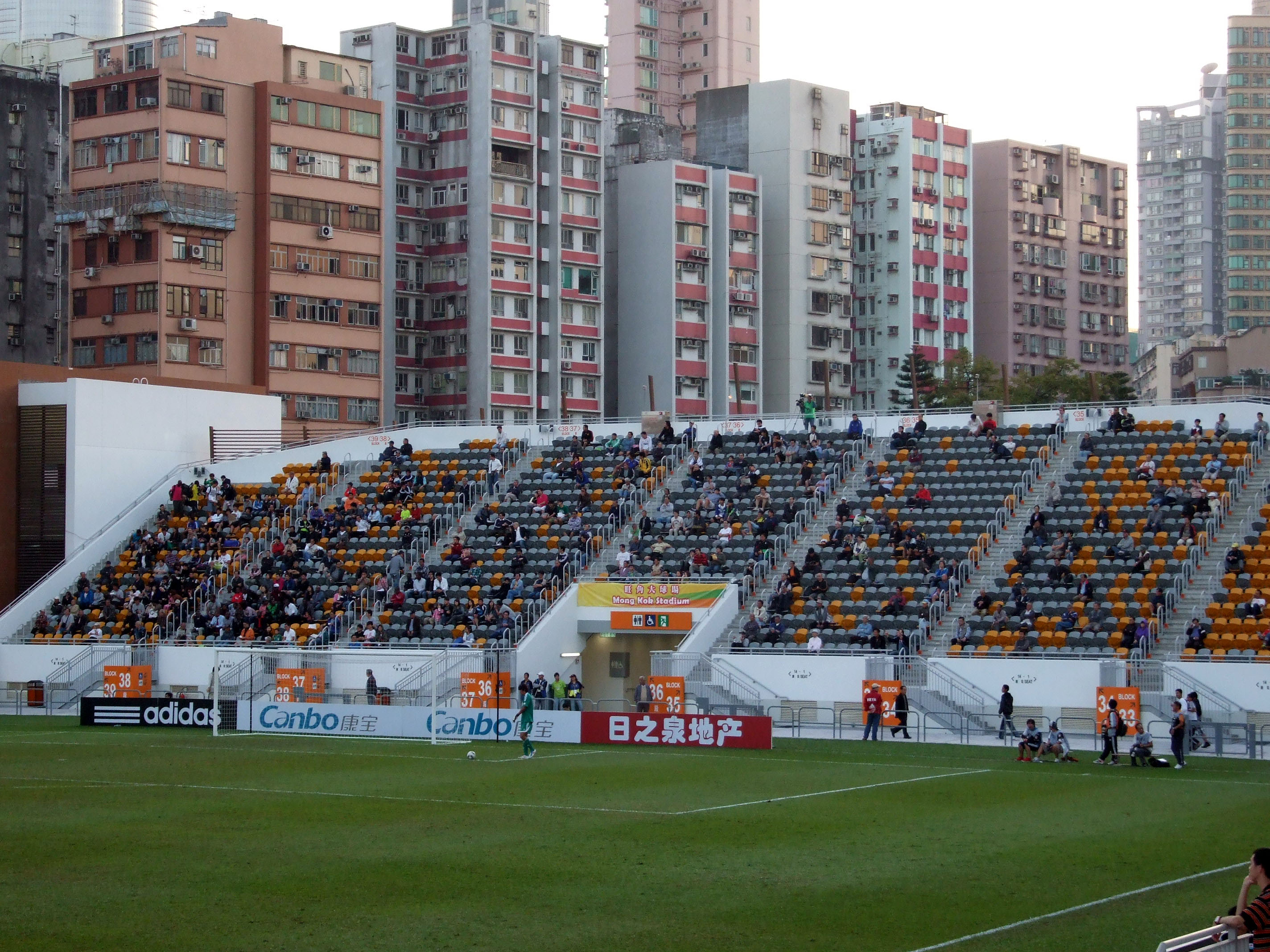
Grandstand

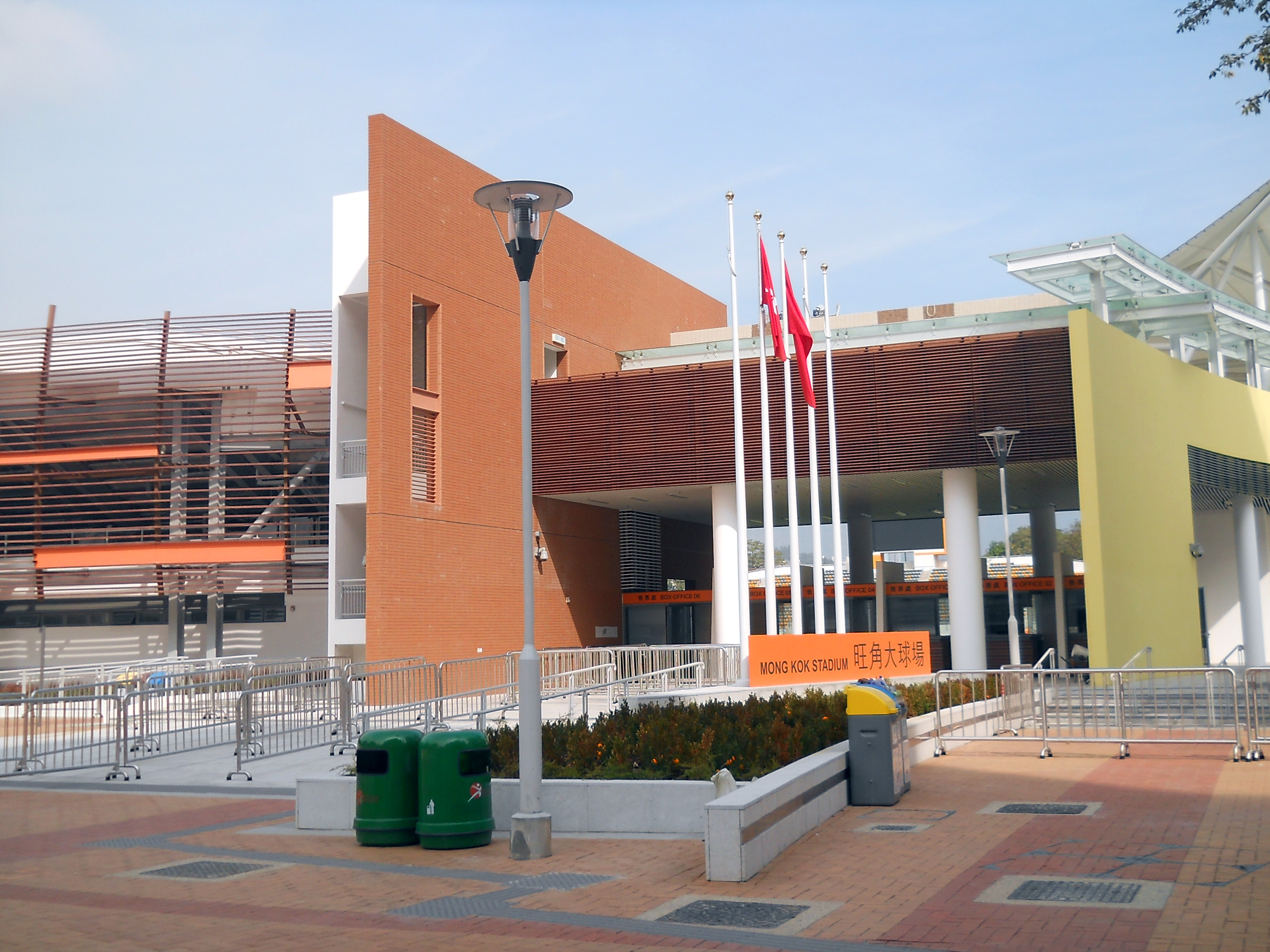
Flower Market Road Entrance

Events and tenants
Preceded by National Stadium (Thailand) Bangkok	AFC Women's Championship; Final Venue; 1986	Succeeded by Mong Kok Stadium; Hong Kong
Preceded by Mong Kok Stadium; Hong Kong	AFC Women's Championship; Final Venue; 1989	Succeeded by Hakatanomori Athletic Stadium (Japan) Fukuoka
