= Lee Myung-geun =

South Korean rugby union coach (born 1978)

- Full name: Lee Myung Geun
- Born: 8 April 1978 (age 48) South Korea
- Height: 170 cm (5 ft 7 in)
- Weight: 73 kg (161 lb; 11 st 7 lb)
- University: Yonsei University

Rugby union career
- Position: Scrum-half
Senior career
Years	Team	Apps	(Points)
1997-2001	Yonsei University		
2001-2003	KAFAC		
2004-2005	Hong Kong Cricket Club		
2005-2007	Samsung SDI		
2007-2009	World Fighting Bull		
2009-2014	Kubota Spears	38	(10)
- Correct as of 2 June 2024
International career
Years	Team	Apps	(Points)
2002-2006	South Korea	6	(15)
- Correct as of 2 June 2024
National sevens team
Years	Team		Comps
2002-2006	South Korea		2
- Correct as of 2 June 2024
Coaching career
- Years: Team
- 2014-2015: Kubota Spears (Assistant Coach)
- 2015-2022: Yonsei University (Backs Coach)
- 2022-: South Korea (Head Coach)
- Correct as of 2 June 2024

Lee Myung-geun (Korean: 이명근; born 8 April 1978) is a former international South Korean rugby union scrum half and current South Korea Head Coach.

== Career ==
He began playing at Yonsei University before playing for the Korean Armed Forces Athletic Corps during his compulsory military service. In 2004, he moved to Hong Kong to play for Hong Kong Cricket Club, winning the 2004-05 Hong Kong Rugby Club League. In 2005, he moved back to South Korea to play for Samsung SDI in the Korea Rugby League.

In 2007, he moved to Japan joining World Fighting Bull in the Top West League, although winning the league they lost in the promotion play offs. With the collapse of World Fighting Bull in 2009 Myung Geun joined Top League side Kubota Spears.

== Coaching career ==
After ending his playing career at Kubota Spears, he joined their coaching set up before moving back to South Korea to be Backs Coach at his former club Yonsei University.

In 2022, he was named as the Head Coach for South Korea ahead of the 2022 Asia Rugby Championship. He also coached the South Korea Sevens side.

== Honors ==
=== As player ===
==== Hong Kong Cricket Club ====
- Hong Kong Rugby Club League
  - Champions: (1) 2004–05

==== World Fighting Bull ====
- Top West League
  - Champions: (1) 2007–08

==== Kubota Spears ====
- Top East League
  - Champions: (1) 2012
  - Runners-up: (1) 2011

==== South Korea ====
- ARFU Asian Rugby Championship
  - Champions: (1) 2002
  - Runners-up: (2) 2004, 2006
- Asian Games
  - Champions: (1) 2002

==== South Korea Sevens ====
- Asian Games
  - Champions: (1) 2002
  - Runners-up: (1) 2006

=== As coach ===
==== South Korea ====
- Asia Rugby Championship
  - Runners-up: (2) 2022, 2023
