= 2025 Asia Rugby Championship =

Rugby union competition for men's national teams

- Dates: 13 June – 5 July 2025
- Countries: Hong Kong; South Korea; Sri Lanka; United Arab Emirates

Final positions
- Champions: Hong Kong
- Relegated: Sri Lanka

Tournament statistics
- Matches played: 4

The 2025 Asia Rugby Championship (Note: Known as the 2025 Asia Rugby Emirates Men's Championship for sponsorship reasons.) is the ninth annual rugby union series for Asia Rugby. The tournament features Hong Kong, South Korea, and the United Arab Emirates, with Sri Lanka returning for the first time since 2014 following their Championship playoff victory against the fourth placed team from 2024, Malaysia. Malaysia joins the other Asian nations played in the lower-tier division tournaments.

== Background and format ==
The format of the series is a single play-off match, followed by a single round-robin where the four remaining teams play each other once. The team finishing on top of the standings at the end of the series is declared the winner. The team finishing at the bottom of the standing are relegated. The competition will begin on 13 June 2025 and will conclude on 5 July 2025.

Hong Kong enter the competition as reigning champions, having won the competition for the fifth time in 2024.

The competition doubles as the final stage of the Asian continental qualifier for the 2027 Men's Rugby World Cup in Australia. The winner of the competition will qualify directly to the World Cup, where it will join Japan who qualified by placing in the 2023 Rugby World Cup, while the runner-up will enter a playoff against Africa 2, the runner-up from the 2025 Africa Cup for the chance to make the 2027 RWC Final Qualification Tournament.

== Participants ==
Team	Stadium			Head coach	Captain	World Rugby Ranking	
Team	Home stadium	Capacity	Location	Head coach	Captain	Start (Note: As at 9 June 2025.)	End (Note: As at 7 July 2025.)
Hong Kong	Kai Tak Youth Sports Ground	5,000	Kai Tak, Kowloon	Andrew Douglas	Joshua Hrstich	23rd	22nd
South Korea	Incheon Namdong Asiad Rugby Field	4,968	Namdong, Incheon	Lee Myung-geun	Lee Jin-kyu	35th	36th
Sri Lanka	Colombo Racecourse	10,000	Cinnamon Gardens, Colombo	Sanath Martis	Nigel Ratwatte	39th	46th
United Arab Emirates	The Sevens Stadium	15,000	Dubai, Emirate of Dubai	TBD		50th	40th

== Standings ==
2025 Asia Rugby Championship Champions

Pos.	Team	Matches				Points			Bonus points	Total points
Pos.	Team	Played	Won	Drawn	Lost	For	Against	Diff.	Bonus points	Total points
1	Hong Kong	3	3	0	0	191	39	+152	3	15
2	United Arab Emirates	3	2	0	1	77	100	–23	2	10
3	South Korea	3	1	0	2	96	142	–46	3	7
4	Sri Lanka	3	0	0	3	62	145	–83	2	2
Points were awarded to the teams as follows: Win — 4 points; Draw — 2 points; 4 or more tries — 1 point; Loss within 7 points — 1 point; Loss greater than 7 points — 0 points

== Fixtures ==
=== Round 1 ===
13 June 2025
16:00 SLST (UTC+5:30)

Sri Lanka	34–38	South Korea
Try: Zubair 15' c Bandara 40' c Thilakaratne 41' c Jansen 45' m Ekanayake 76' m Con: Ratwatte (3/5) 16', 40', 41'; Pen: Ratwatte (1/1) 20'; Cards: Jansen (yellow card) 70'	Report	Try: Jeong Min 5' c Ok Gi 37' c Nam Uk 47' c Seok Hwan 54' m Yeon Sik 61' m Penalty try 70'; Con: Hyun Goo (3/5) 6', 38', 48'

Colombo Racecourse, Colombo
Attendance: 2,000
Referee: JP Clements (UAE)

14 June 2025
19:30 UAEST (UTC+4)

United Arab Emirates	10–43	Hong Kong
Try: Janes 19' c Con: Johnson 20'; Pen: Johnson 30'; Cards: Guerin (yellow card) 58'; Botes (yellow card) 68'	Report	Try: Donnell 12' c Denmark 24' m Chapman 36' c Worley 46' c Penalty try 60'; Scott 71' c Con: De Thierry 13' 38' 57'; Altier 70'; Pen: De Thierry 3'; Cards: Hrstich (yellow card) 63'; Hrstich (yellow card) 73'

The Sevens Stadium, Dubai
Referee: Katsuki Furuse (Japan)

=== Round 2 ===
21 June 2025
15:00 KST (UTC+9)

South Korea	36–38	United Arab Emirates
Try: Penalty try 27'; Jae Jun 32' c In Bum 35' c Jun Young 41' m Hyun Soo 45' c Con: Hyun Goo (3/4) 33', 36', 46'; Pen: Hyun Goo (1/1) 64'	Report	Try: Sejean 10' c Volavola (3) 20' c, 69' c, 72' m Stapley 40' c Janes 58' m Con: Johnson (4/6) 11', 20', 40', 70'; Pen: Barnard (yellow card) 27'

Incheon Namdong Asiad Rugby Field, Incheon
Attendance: 500
Referee: Morgan White (Hong Kong China)

22 June 2025
16:30 HKT (UTC+8)

Hong Kong	78–7	Sri Lanka
Try: Scott 11' c van der Smith (3) 16' c, 63' c, 77' m Worley (3) 19' m, 55' c, 80' c Hrstich 23' c Altier (2) 30' c, 43' m MacKinlay-West 67' c Sayers 70' c Con: De Thierry (2/3) 11', 16'; Altier (7/8) 14', 30', 56', 64', 67', 71', 80'	Report	Try: Bandara 38' c Con: Ratwatte (1/1) 39'

Kai Tak Youth Sports Ground, Kowloon
Attendance: 2,305
Referee: Jaco De Wit (UAE)

=== Round 3 ===
4 July 2025
16:00 SLST (UTC+5:30)

Sri Lanka	21–29	United Arab Emirates
Try: Rifan 19' c Karunathilake 43' m Con: Ratwatte (1/2) 20'; Pen: Ratwatte (3/3) 11', 23', 40'; Cards: Gamage (yellow card) 65'	Report	Try: Stapley (2) 6' c, 72' c Janes 13' m Naisau 38' c Con: Johnson (3/4) 7', 39', 72'; Pen: Johnson (1/1) 30'; Cards: Semple (yellow card) 60'

Colombo Racecourse, Colombo
Attendance: 1,000
Referee: Craig Chan (Hong Kong China)

5 July 2025
15:00 KST (UTC+9)

South Korea	22–70	Hong Kong
Try: Yong Heung (2) 57' c, 64' c In Bum 68' m Con: Jeong Wook (2/3) 58', 65'; Pen: Jeong Wook (1/1) 15'; Cards: Nam Uk (yellow card) 20'; Yeon Sik (yellow card) 77'	Report	Try: Worley 2' c Post (2) 13' c, 28' c Hrstich (2) 21' c, 54' c Altier 24' c Sawye 40' c Sayers 45' c Denmark 61' c van der Smith 78' c Con: De Thierry (9/9) 3', 14', 21', 25', 29', 40', 46', 55', 62'; Altier (1/1) 79'; Cards: Axten-Burrett (red card) 37'

Incheon Namdong Asiad Rugby Field, Incheon
Attendance: 1,000
Referee: Ibuki Tetsuka (Japan)
