= 1998 ARFU Asian Rugby Championship =

1998 Asian Rugby Championship
Tournament details
- Host: Singapore
- Date: 24–31 October 1998
- Countries: 10

Final positions
- Champions: Japan (12th title)

Tournament statistics
- Matches played: 15

The 1998 ARFU Asian Rugby Championship was the 16th edition of the tournament, and was played in Singapore. The 10 teams were divided in two division. Japan won the tournament.

== Tournament ==
=== First division ===
| Place | Nation | Games | | | | Points | | | Table points |
| Place | Nation | played | won | drawn | lost | for | against | difference | Table points |
|---|---|---|---|---|---|---|---|---|---|
| 1 | Japan | 3 | 3 | 0 | 0 | 221 | 25 | 196 | 6 |
| 2 | South Korea | 3 | 1 | 0 | 2 | 104 | 81 | 23 | 2 |
| 3 | Hong Kong | 3 | 1 | 0 | 2 | 39 | 88 | -49 | 2 |
| 4 | Taiwan | 3 | 1 | 0 | 2 | 57 | 227 | -170 | 2 |

24 October 1998

| Japan | 40–12 | South Korea |

Singapore

24 October 1998

| Hong Kong | 12–30 | Taiwan |

Singapore

27 October 1998

| Japan | 134–6 | Taiwan |

Singapore

27 October 1998

| Hong Kong | 20–11 | South Korea |

Singapore

31 October 1998

| South Korea | 81–21 | Taiwan |

Singapore

31 October 1998

| Japan | 47–7 | Hong Kong |

Singapore

=== Second Division ===
==== Pool 1 ====
| Place | Nation | Games | | | | Points | | | Table points |
| Place | Nation | played | won | drawn | lost | for | against | difference | Table points |
|---|---|---|---|---|---|---|---|---|---|
| 1 | Sri Lanka | 2 | 2 | 0 | 0 | 85 | 8 | 77 | 4 |
| 2 | Malaysia | 2 | 1 | 0 | 1 | 37 | 69 | -32 | 2 |
| 3 | China | 2 | 0 | 0 | 2 | 30 | 75 | -45 | 0 |

24 October 1998

| Malaysia | 32–25 | China |

Singapore

26 October 1998

| Sri Lanka | 43–5 | China |

Singapore

28 October 1998

| Sri Lanka | 44–3 | Malaysia |

Singapore

==== Pool 2 ====
| Place | Nation | Games | | | | Points | | | Table points |
| Place | Nation | played | won | drawn | lost | for | against | difference | Table points |
|---|---|---|---|---|---|---|---|---|---|
| 1 | Singapore | 2 | 2 | 0 | 0 | 91 | 0 | 91 | 4 |
| 2 | Thailand | 2 | 1 | 0 | 1 | 90 | 12 | 78 | 2 |
| 3 | India | 2 | 0 | 0 | 2 | 6 | 175 | -169 | 0 |

24 October 1998

| Singapore | 6–0 withdraw | Thailand |

Singapore

26 October 1998

| Singapore | 85–0 | India |

Singapore

28 October 1998

| Thailand | 90–6 | India |

Singapore

=== Finals ===
- First Place final

31 October 1998

| Singapore | 42–13 | Sri Lanka |

Singapore

- Third Place Final

31 October 1998

| Thailand | 28–8 | Malaysia |

Singapore

°Fifth Place Final

31 October 1998

| China | 42–13 | India |

Singapore

== Bibliography ==
- (in Italian) Francesco Volpe, Paolo Pacitti (Author), Rugby 2000, GTE Gruppo Editorale (1999).
