= 1982 ARFU Asian Rugby Championship =

1982 Asian Rugby Championship
Tournament details
- Host: Singapore
- Date: 20–27 November 1982
- Countries: 8

Final positions
- Champions: South Korea (1st title)

Tournament statistics
- Matches played: 14

The 1982 ARFU Asian Rugby Championship was the 8th edition of the tournament and was played in Singapore. The 8 teams were divided in two pools with a final match between the winners from the two. South Korea won the tournament.

== Tournament ==
=== Pool A ===
Place	Nation	Games				Points			Table points
Place	Nation	played	won	drawn	lost	for	against	difference	Table points
1	Japan	3	3	0	0	103	18	85	6
2	Hong Kong	3	2	0	1	66	37	29	4
3	Taiwan	3	1	0	2	28	52	-24	2
4	Thailand	3	0	0	3	12	102	-90	0

20 November 1982

Taiwan	20–0	Thailand

Singapore

20 November 1982

Japan XV	29–6	Hong Kong

Singapore

22 November 1982

Japan XV	31–6	Taiwan

Singapore

22 November 1982

Hong Kong	39–6	Thailand

Singapore

24 November 1982

Japan XV	43–6	Thailand

Singapore

24 November 1982

Hong Kong	21–2	Taiwan

Singapore

=== Pool B ===
Place	Nation	Games				Points			Table points
Place	Nation	played	won	drawn	lost	for	against	difference	Table points
1	South Korea	3	3	0	0	64	12	52	6
2	Malaysia	3	2	0	1	50	58	-8	4
3	Singapore	3	1	0	2	15	35	-20	2
4	Sri Lanka	3	0	0	3	20	44	-24	0

20 November 1982

South Korea	40–12	Malaysia

Singapore

20 November 1982

Singapore	9–8	Sri Lanka

Singapore

22 November 1982

South Korea	12–0	Singapore

Singapore

22 November 1982

Malaysia	23–12	Sri Lanka

Singapore

24 November 1982

Malaysia	15–6	Singapore

Singapore

24 November 1982

South Korea	12–0	Sri Lanka

Singapore

=== Finals ===
==== Third Place Final ====
27 November 1982

Hong Kong	10–4	Malaysia

Singapore

==== First Place Final ====
27 November 1982

South Korea	12–9	Japan

Singapore
