= 1969 ARFU Asian Rugby Championship =

1969 Asian Rugby Championship
Tournament details
- Host: Japan
- Date: 8–16 March 1969
- Countries: 5

Final positions
- Champions: Japan (1st title)

Tournament statistics
- Matches played: 9

The 1969 Asian Rugby Championship was the 1st edition of the tournament, and it was played in Tokyo, Japan. Five teams participated and Japan won the tournament. Some of the matches were postponed due to heavy snow and the match between South Korea and Thailand was cancelled.

== Tournament ==
Ten games were scheduled but only nine were played. As reported in the Japanese-language journal Rugby Football – using the scoring method of the time where a try (T) was worth 3 points; a goal (G) was worth 5 points, try included; and a penalty goal (PG) was worth 3 points – the match results were:

8 March 1969

South Korea	9–15	Taiwan

Chichibunomiya Rugby Stadium

8 March 1969

Japan XV	82–8	Thailand

Chichibunomiya Rugby Stadium

9 March 1969

Hong Kong	22–24	Japan XV

Chichibunomiya Rugby Stadium

10 March 1969

Taiwan	0–27	Hong Kong

Chichibunomiya Rugby Stadium

14 March 1969

South Korea	3–8	Hong Kong

Chichibunomiya Rugby Stadium

14 March 1969

Taiwan	8–14	Thailand

Chichibunomiya Rugby Stadium

15 March 1969

Japan XV	62–0	Taiwan

Chichibunomiya Rugby Stadium

15 March 1969

South Korea	Cancelled	Thailand

16 March 1969

Thailand	0–32	Hong Kong

Chichibunomiya Rugby Stadium

16 March 1969

South Korea	5–23	Japan XV

Chichibunomiya Rugby Stadium

As of 2022, sources in English for this tournament tend to be incomplete. Korean-language sources reported on the tournament at the time but recorded some results incorrectly: Schedule, March 8 (result for Japan vs Thailand is incorrect), March 9, March 11, March 14 (result for Taiwan vs Thailand is incorrect), March 16, March 17.

== Standings ==
Place	Nation	Games					Points			Table points
Place	Nation	played	won	drawn	lost	no result	for	against	difference	Table points
1	Japan	4	4	0	0	0	191	35	156	8
2	Hong Kong	4	3	0	1	0	89	27	62	6
3	Thailand	3	1	0	2	1	22	122	-100	3
4	Taiwan	4	1	0	3	0	23	112	-89	2
5	South Korea	3	0	0	3	1	17	46	-29	1
