= Back Kwang-soo =

South Korean rugby union footballer (born 1975)

- Born: 4 July 1975 (age 51) South Korea
- Height: 1.86 m (6 ft 1 in)
- Weight: 96 kg (15.1 st)

Rugby union career
- Position: Flanker
Senior career
| Years | Team | Apps | (Points) |
- Korea Electric Power
International career
| Years | Team | Apps | (Points) |
| | South Korea | 26 | |

- Back Kwang-soo
- Hangul: 백광수
- RR: Baek Gwangsu
- MR: Paek Kwangsu

Back Kwang-soo (born 4 July 1975) is a South Korean rugby union footballer. He plays at the flanker position.

He played for Korea Electric Power, in South Korea. He is one of the best players for the Korea national rugby union team and he's currently the most capped for his country with 26 matches.
