= 2002 ARFU Asian Rugby Championship =

2002 Asian Rugby Championship
Tournament details
- Host: Thailand
- Date: 16–23 November 2002
- Countries: 11

Final positions
- Champions: South Korea (5th title)

Tournament statistics
- Matches played: 18

The 2002 ARFU Asian Rugby Championship was the 18th edition of the tournament, and was played in Bangkok, Thailand 16–23 November 2002. The 11 teams were divided into two divisions.

== Tournament ==
=== First Division ===
Place	Nation	Games				Points			Table points
Place	Nation	played	won	drawn	lost	for	against	difference	Table points
1	South Korea	3	3	0	0	97	47	50	6
2	Japan	3	2	0	1	93	54	39	4
3	Hong Kong	3	1	0	2	50	85	-35	2
4	Chinese Taipei	3	0	0	3	43	97	-54	0

17 November 2002

South Korea	35–10	Chinese Taipei

Bangkok

17 November 2002

Hong Kong	15–29	Japan

Bangkok

20 November 2002

Japan	44–17	Chinese Taipei

Bangkok

20 November 2002

Hong Kong	17–40	South Korea

Bangkok

23 November 2002

Hong Kong	18–16	Chinese Taipei

Bangkok

23 November 2002

South Korea	22–20	Japan

Bangkok

=== Second Division ===
==== Pool 1 ====
Place	Nation	Games				Points			Table points
Place	Nation	played	won	drawn	lost	for	against	difference	Table points
1	Thailand	3	3	0	0	170	34	136	6
2	Kazakhstan	3	2	0	1	142	57	85	4
3	Sri Lanka	3	1	0	2	50	85	-35	2
4	India	3	0	0	3	35	210	-175	0

16 November 2002

Kazakhstan	29–16	Sri Lanka

Bangkok

16 November 2002

Thailand	67–10	India

Bangkok

18 November 2002

Thailand	72–0	Sri Lanka

Bangkok

18 November 2002

Kazakhstan	89–10	India

Bangkok

20 November 2002

India	15–54	Sri Lanka

Bangkok

20 November 2002

Thailand	31–24	Kazakhstan

Bangkok

==== Pool 2 ====
Place	Nation	Games				Points			Table points
Place	Nation	played	won	drawn	lost	for	against	difference	Table points
1	Arabian Gulf	2	2	0	0	91	0	91	4
2	Singapore	2	1	0	1	90	12	78	2
3	Malaysia	2	0	0	2	6	175	-169	0

16 November 2002

Arabian Gulf	36–13	Malaysia

Bangkok

18 November 2002

Singapore	46–9	Malaysia

Bangkok

20 November 2002

Singapore	7–26	Arabian Gulf

Bangkok

=== Finals ===
==== 5th place final ====
22 November 2002

Sri Lanka	61–18	Malaysia

Bangkok

==== Third Place Final ====
22 November 2002

Singapore	30–14	Kazakhstan

Bangkok

==== First Place final ====
23 November 2002

Thailand	20–12	Arabian Gulf

Bangkok
