= Asia Rugby Championship =

Annual rugby union competition

- Recent season or competition 2026 Asia Rugby Championship
- Sport: Rugby union
- Formerly known as: Asian Five Nations
- Instituted: 1969; 2008 (as Asian Five Nations); 2015 (ARC)
- Governing body: Asia Rugby
- Holders: Hong Kong (7 titles)
- Most titles: Japan (25 titles)
- Website: asiarugby.com/championship

The Asia Rugby Championship, or ARC, is an annual rugby union competition held amongst national rugby sides within the Asia Rugby region. The competition was originally known as the Asian Rugby Football Tournament when founded in 1969, and was called the Asian Five Nations from 2008 to 2014.

The winner of the competition's top division is recognised as the rugby champion of Asia. The top division, sometimes referred to as the Tri Nations, includes the top three Asian teams each season. Division 1 includes the next four teams and Division 2 includes the next four. Division three is further divided geographically, with each of the West, East and South Central divisions including three teams.

Japan is the most successful team, securing 25 out of a possible 30 titles since 1969. They have not participated in the series since 2017. Since then, Since then, Hong Kong has won the title 7 times in a row.

== History ==
The competition was formed as the Asian Rugby Football Tournament in 1969. Chinese Taipei, Hong Kong, Japan, Korea and Thailand contested the inaugural Asian title. Japan were the champions on that occasion.

The tournament was held biennially for the most of its first four decades. It wasn't until 1982 that South Korea became the second team to win the title. The number of teams participating varied from year to year, with as many as 12 teams competing as other Asian teams joined the competition. From 1969 to 1996, there was a single division split into two groups. But in 1998, a second division was introduced as the game began to grow in Asia.

In 2003, a second Asian competition called the Asian Rugby Series was formed. The Asian Rugby Series ran alongside the Rugby Championship to help determine divisional allocations for the Asian Rugby Championship. With more teams competing, a third division was added to the Rugby Championship in 2004. The dual competitions ran until 2007.

Asian Five Nations Logo

=== Asian Five Nations (2008–14) ===
In 2008, the ARFU merged the Rugby Championship and Rugby Series into the Asian Five Nations. The competition became an annual championship and a promotion-relegation format was introduced. The winner of Division 2 replaced the loser of Division 1, and the winner of Division 1 replaced the loser of the Five Nations. For its inaugural years, no Division 3 took place, though several regional divisions were implemented across Asia. During the time of this competition, the main Five Nations division was dominated by Japan, South Korea and Hong Kong; the only three teams never to have been relegated to a lower division.

=== Asia Rugby Championship (2015 onward) ===
The competition was revamped again for the 2015 season as the Asia Rugby Championship. Under the new format, the top three teams formed a Tri nations division. A promotion-relegation challenge was instituted whereby the Division 1 winner had to defeat the Tri nations third place-getter to gain promotion for the next season.

== Format ==
The current format sees the competition separated into various divisions, with a promotion and relegation format operated into each division. However, this only applies to Division 1 through 3, as the loser of the Tri Nations Division will play a play-off match against the winner of Division 1 to determine the third Tri Nations team for the following year. Where as the winners of Division 2 will automatically replace the loser of Division 1, and the two bottom placed teams in Division 2 will both be relegated down to one of the three regions in Division 3; West, East or South Central. Each of the three regions are made up three teams, and as of 2015, only the winners of the South Central and East divisions can be promoted to Division 2. This is because, the teams competing in the West region, are not considered as full members by World Rugby.

In 2015 in the main Tri Nations division, each team played each other on a home and away basis, picking up 5 points for a win and 3 for a draw. 2 additional points are up for grabs through bonus points, but in order to earn them, teams need to score 4 or more tries in a match, or when losing, lose by 7 points or less. In 2016 the points awarded were changed to 4 points for a win and 1 point for a draw with bonus points the same. For all Divisions, 1 through to 3, nations will only play each other once, with one of the included teams hosting all matches at home. These teams will also aim to pick points up for a win or draw, and gain bonus points. For all divisions, the team with the most table points wins their respective divisions, and if possible, earns promotion to the next division.

== Current divisions ==
As of 2025, the competition divisions are:

ARC Hong Kong; South Korea; Sri Lanka; United Arab Emirates	Division 1 India; Kazakhstan; Malaysia; Qatar

== Previous winners ==
=== All-time summary ===
As of the 2026 Asia Rugby Championship.

Rank	Team	Champion	Runner‑up	Third place	Total
1	Japan	25	5	0	30
2	Hong Kong	7	8	15	30
3	South Korea	5	18	9	32
4	United Arab Emirates	0	2	1	3
5	Kazakhstan	0	2	0	2
6	Thailand	0	1	3	4
7	Sri Lanka	0	1	1	2
8	Malaysia	0	0	4	4
9	Chinese Taipei	0	0	3	3
10	Singapore	0	0	1	1
Totals (10 entries)		37	37	37	111

=== Asia Rugby Championship ===
Year	Edn	Host • Teams		Final placings			
Asian Rugby Tournament				Winner	Runner-up	Third	Fourth
1969	I	Tokyo	5	Japan	Hong Kong	Thailand	Taiwan
1970	II	Bangkok	7	Japan	Thailand	Hong Kong	Singapore
1972	III	Hong Kong	7	Japan	Hong Kong	Thailand	Singapore
1974	IV	Colombo	8	Japan	Sri Lanka	South Korea	Malaysia
1976	V	Tokyo	8	Japan	South Korea	Chinese Taipei	Thailand
1978	VI	Kuala Lumpur	7	Japan	South Korea	Singapore	Thailand
1980	VII	Taipei	8	Japan	South Korea	Hong Kong	Chinese Taipei
1982	VIII	Singapore	8	South Korea	Japan	Hong Kong	Malaysia
1984	IX	Fukuoka	8	Japan	South Korea	Chinese Taipei	Thailand
1986	X	Bangkok	8	South Korea	Japan	Thailand	Chinese Taipei
1988	XI	Hong Kong	8	South Korea	Japan	Hong Kong	Chinese Taipei
1990	XII	Colombo	8	South Korea	Japan	Hong Kong	Thailand
1992	XIII	Seoul	8	Japan	Hong Kong	South Korea	Thailand
1994	XIV	Kuala Lumpur	8	Japan	South Korea	Hong Kong	Chinese Taipei
1996	XV	Taipei	7	Japan	South Korea	Hong Kong	Chinese Taipei
Asian Rugby Champs Div I				Winner	Runner-up	Third	Fourth
1998	XVI	Singapore	4	Japan	South Korea	Hong Kong	Chinese Taipei
2000	XVII	Aomori	4	Japan	South Korea	Chinese Taipei	Hong Kong
2002	XVIII	Bangkok	4	South Korea	Japan	Hong Kong	Chinese Taipei
2004	XIX	Hong Kong	4	Japan	South Korea	Hong Kong	Chinese Taipei
2006	XX	Hong Kong	3	Japan	South Korea	Hong Kong	—N/a
Asian Five Nations				Winner	Runner-up	Third	Fourth
2008	XXI	round-robin home or away	5	Japan	South Korea	Hong Kong	Kazakhstan
2009	XXII	round-robin home or away	5	Japan	Kazakhstan	South Korea	Hong Kong
2010	XXIII	round-robin home or away	5	Japan	Kazakhstan	Hong Kong	(Cooperation Council for the Arab States of the Gulf) Arabian Gulf
2011	XXIV	round-robin home or away	5	Japan	Hong Kong	United Arab Emirates	Kazakhstan
2012	XXV	round-robin home or away	5	Japan	South Korea	Hong Kong	United Arab Emirates
2013	XXVI	round-robin home or away	5	Japan	South Korea	Hong Kong	Philippines
2014	XXVII	round-robin home or away	5	Japan	Hong Kong	South Korea	Philippines^{*}
Asia Rugby Championship				Winner	Runner-up	Third	Fourth
2015	XXVIII	home and away	3	Japan	Hong Kong	^{^{†}}South Korea	—N/a
2016	XXIX	home and away	3	Japan	Hong Kong	^{^{†}}South Korea	—N/a
2017	XXX	home and away	3	Japan	Hong Kong	^{^{†}}South Korea	—N/a
2018^{^{a}}	XXXI	home and away	3	Hong Kong	South Korea	^{^{†}}Malaysia	—N/a
2019^{^{a}}	XXXII	home and away	3	Hong Kong	South Korea	^{^{†}}Malaysia	—N/a
2022	XXXIII	play-off	3	Hong Kong	South Korea	^{^{†}}Malaysia	—N/a
2023	XXXIV	play-off	3	Hong Kong	South Korea	^{^{†}}Malaysia	—N/a
2024	XXXV	round-robin home or away	4	Hong Kong	United Arab Emirates	South Korea	^{^{*}}Malaysia
2025	XXXVI	round-robin home or away	4	Hong Kong	United Arab Emirates	South Korea	Sri Lanka
2026	XXXVII	round-robin home or away	3	Hong Kong	South Korea	Sri Lanka	—N/a

Notes:

^^{*} Relegated to the division below

^^{†} Able to be challenged by the winner of the division below to play in a promotion-relegation play-off.

^^{a} Japan—as hosts of the 2019 Rugby World Cup–did not defend their Asia rugby Championship title in 2018 to allow the Tri Nations competition to form part of the 2019 Rugby World Cup – Asia qualification process. Instead of returning to the trinations for 2019, Japan played the Pacific Nations to prepare for the World Cup.

=== Division tournaments ===
Year	Div	Host • Teams		Final placings			
ARC Divisions				Winner	Runner-up	Third	Fourth
1998	2	Singapore	6	Singapore	Sri Lanka	Thailand	Malaysia
2000	2	Ōwani	4	Singapore	China	Sri Lanka	Thailand
2002	2	Bangkok	7	Thailand	(Cooperation Council for the Arab States of the Gulf) Arabian Gulf	Singapore	Kazakhstan
2004	2	Hong Kong	4	Singapore	Thailand	Kazakhstan	(Cooperation Council for the Arab States of the Gulf) Arabian Gulf
2004	3	Hong Kong	4	China	Sri Lanka	India	Pakistan
2007	2	Colombo	6	Kazakhstan	Sri Lanka	China	Chinese Taipei
2007	3	Colombo	3	Iran	India	Pakistan	—N/a
Asian Five Nations Divisions				Winner	Runner-up	Third	Fourth
2008	1	Taiwan	4	^{^{§}}Singapore	Chinese Taipei	Sri Lanka	^{^{‡}}China
2008	2	Thailand	4	^{^{§}}Thailand	Malaysia	India	Pakistan
2008	P	Guam	3	^{^{§}}Philippines	^{^{§}}Guam	Brunei	—N/a
2008	C	Sri Lanka	3	^{^{§}}Iran	Uzbekistan	Kyrgyzstan	—N/a
2008	SE	Indonesia	3	^{^{§}}Indonesia	Laos	Cambodia	—N/a
2009	1	Dubai	4	^{^{§}} (Cooperation Council for the Arab States of the Gulf) Arabian Gulf	Chinese Taipei	Sri Lanka	^{^{‡}}Thailand
2009	2	Malaysia	4	^{^{§}}Malaysia	China	India	^{^{‡}}Pakistan
2009	3	Philippines	4	^{^{§}}Philippines	Guam	Iran	Indonesia
2009	C	Uzbekistan	3	^{^{§}}Uzbekistan	Kyrgyzstan	Mongolia	—N/a
2009	SE	Laos	3	^{^{§}}Laos	Brunei	Cambodia	—N/a
2010	1	Singapore	4	^{^{§}}Sri Lanka	Singapore	Malaysia	^{^{‡}}Chinese Taipei
2010	2	India	4	^{^{§}}Philippines	India	Thailand	^{^{‡}}China
2010	3	Indonesia	4	^{^{§}}Iran	Pakistan	Guam	Indonesia
2010	4	Kazakhstan	4	^{^{§}}Jordan	Uzbekistan	(Kazakhstan) Almaty Select	Mongolia
2011	1	South Korea	4	^{^{§}}South Korea	Singapore	Philippines	^{^{‡}}Malaysia
2011	2	Thailand	4	^{^{§}}Chinese Taipei	Thailand	Iran	^{^{‡}}India
2011	3	Indonesia	4	^{^{§}}China	Guam	Indonesia	Pakistan
2011	4	Dubai	4	^{^{§}}Qatar	Lebanon	Jordan	Uzbekistan
2011	5	Cambodia & Laos	2	^{^{§}}Laos	Cambodia	—N/a	—N/a
2012	1	Philippines	4	^{^{§}}Philippines	Sri Lanka	Chinese Taipei	^{^{‡}}Singapore
2012	2	Malaysia	4	^{^{§}}Thailand	Malaysia	Iran	^{^{‡}}China
2012	3	Indonesia	4	^{^{§}}India	Guam	Indonesia	^{^{‡}}Pakistan
2012	4	Dubai	4	^{^{§}}Qatar	Lebanon	Jordan	Uzbekistan
2012	5	Cambodia	3	^{^{§}}Laos	Brunei	Cambodia	—N/a
2013	1	Sri Lanka	4	^{^{§}}Sri Lanka	Kazakhstan	Chinese Taipei	^{^{‡}}Thailand
2013	2	Malaysia	4	^{^{§}}Singapore	Malaysia	Iran	^{^{‡}}India
2013	3	Malaysia	4	^{^{§}}Qatar	Guam	Indonesia	China
2013	4	Dubai	4	^{^{§}}Lebanon	Pakistan	Uzbekistan	Laos
2013	5	Cambodia	2	^{^{§}}Cambodia	Brunei	—N/a	—N/a
2014	1	Dubai & Hong Kong	4	Kazakhstan; Singapore		^{^{‡}}United Arab Emirates^{^{‡}}Chinese Taipei	
2014	2	Qatar	4	Malaysia	Qatar	Iran	Thailand
2014	3E	Laos	4	China	Guam	Indonesia	Laos
2014	3W	Pakistan	4	Lebanon	Uzbekistan	India	Pakistan
2014	4	Brunei	3	Mongolia	Cambodia	Brunei	—N/a
ARC Divisions				Winner	Runner-up	Third	Fourth
2015	1	Philippines	4	Sri Lanka	Philippines	Kazakhstan	^{^{‡}}Singapore
2015	2	Malaysia	4	^{^{§}}Malaysia	United Arab Emirates	^{^{‡}}Chinese Taipei	^{^{‡}}Thailand
2015	3E	Indonesia	3	^{^{§}}Guam	China	Indonesia	—N/a
2015	3SC	Uzbekistan	2	^{^{§}}Uzbekistan	India	—N/a	—N/a
2015	3W	Lebanon	3	Lebanon	Iran	Jordan	—N/a
2016	1	Malaysia	4	Malaysia	Sri Lanka	Philippines	^{^{‡}}Singapore
2016	2	Uzbekistan	4	United Arab Emirites	Thailand	Guam	^{^{‡}}Uzbekistan
2016	3E	Thailand	2	Laos	Indonesia	—N/a	—N/a
2016	3WC	Qatar	3	Qatar	Lebanon	Iran	—N/a
2016	3W	Jordan	3	Jordan	(United Arab Emirates) UAE Shaheen	Saudi Arabia	—N/a
2017	1	Malaysia	4	^{^{§}}Malaysia	Sri Lanka	Philippines	United Arab Emirates
2017	2	Taiwan	4	^{^{§}}Singapore	Thailand	Chinese Taipei	India
2017	3W	Uzbekistan	3	Lebanon	Uzbekistan	Iran	—N/a
2018	1	Philippines	2	Philippines	Singapore	—N/a	—N/a
2018	2	Thailand	3	^{^{§}}Chinese Taipei	Thailand	India	—N/a
2018	3E	Brunei	3	Guam	China	Brunei	—N/a
2018	3C	Kazakhstan	4	Kazakhstan	Pakistan	Mongolia	Kyrgyzstan
2018	3W	Lebanon	4	Lebanon	Iran	Qatar	Jordan
2019	1	Taipei	4	Philippines	Singapore	Sri Lanka	Chinese Taipei
2019	2	Thailand	4	United Arab Emirites	Thailand	Kazakhstan	^{^{‡}}Guam
2019	3ES	Indonesia	3	China	India	Indonesia	—
2019	3C	Pakistan	2	Pakistan	Uzbekistan	—	—
2019	3W	Qatar	3	Qatar	Lebanon	Jordan	—
2022	2	Pakistan	2	Pakistan	Thailand	—N/a	—N/a
2022	3C	Kyrgyzstan	4	Kazakhstan	Uzbekistan	Mongolia	Kyrgyzstan
2022	3W	Al Ain	2	Qatar	Iran	—N/a	—
2022	3S	India	3	India	Bangladesh	Nepal	—
2023	1	Pakistan	2	United Arab Emirates	Pakistan	—N/a	—
2023	2	Qatar	3	Qatar	Kazakhstan	India	—
2024	1	Sri Lanka	4	Sri Lanka	Kazakhstan	Qatar	India
2025	n/a	Playoff only	2	Sri Lanka hosted Malaysia, winning 59–19 to advance to the 2025 ARC tournament			

Notes:

^^{‡} Relegated to the division below.

^^{§} Won promotion, or the right to a challenge play-off for promotion, to the division above.

== See also ==
- Asia Rugby Women's Championship
- ARFU Asian Rugby Series – a former competition that merged with the ARC to become the Asian Five Nations in 2008.
- Asia Rugby
- Rugby union in Asia
