= 2000 ARFU Asian Rugby Championship =

2000 Asian Rugby Championship
Tournament details
- Host: Japan
- Date: 24 June – 2 July 2000
- Countries: 8

Final positions
- Champions: Japan (13th title)

Tournament statistics
- Matches played: 12

The 2000 ARFU Asian Rugby Championship was the 17th edition of the tournament, and was played in Aomori. The 8 teams were divided in two division. Japan won the tournament.

== Tournament ==
=== First Division ===
Place	Nation	Games				Points			Table points
Place	Nation	played	won	drawn	lost	for	against	difference	Table points
1	Japan	3	3	0	0	164	41	123	6
2	South Korea	3	2	0	1	120	87	33	4
3	Chinese Taipei	3	1	0	2	56	123	-67	2
4	Hong Kong	3	0	0	3	47	136	-89	0

25 June 2000

South Korea	55–19	Chinese Taipei

Aomori

25 June 2000

Japan XV	75–0	Hong Kong

Aomori

28 June 2000

Japan XV	55–12	Chinese Taipei

Aomori

28 June 2000

South Korea	36–34	Hong Kong

Aomori

2 July 2000

Japan	34–29	South Korea

Aomori

2 July 2000

Chinese Taipei	25–13	Hong Kong

Aomori

=== Second Division ===
Place	Nation	Games				Points			Table points
Place	Nation	played	won	drawn	lost	for	against	difference	Table points
1	Singapore	3	2	0	1	77	47	30	4
2	China	3	2	0	1	81	61	20	4
3	Sri Lanka	3	1	0	2	68	80	-12	2
4	Thailand	3	1	0	2	78	116	-38	2

24 June 2000

China	15–13	Singapore

Owani

24 June 2000

Thailand	38–28	Sri Lanka

Aomori

28 June 2000

Sri Lanka	28–27	China

Aomori

28 June 2000

Singapore	49–20	Thailand

Owani

2 July 2000

China	39–20	Thailand

Owani

2 July 2000

Singapore	15–12	Sri Lanka

Aomori
