= 1986 ARFU Asian Rugby Championship =

1986 Asian Rugby Championship
Tournament details
- Host: Thailand
- Date: 22–29 November 1986
- Countries: 8

Final positions
- Champions: South Korea

Tournament statistics
- Matches played: 14

The 1986 ARFU Asian Rugby Championship was the 10th edition of the tournament, and was played in Bangkok, Thailand. The 8 teams were divided into two pools and played single round-robin matches. The final match was held between the winners of the two pools, and the third-place match between the runners-up. South Korea won the tournament.

== Tournament ==
=== Pool A ===
Place	Nation	Games				Points			Table points
Place	Nation	played	won	drawn	lost	for	against	difference	Table points
1	Japan	3	3	0	0	156	10	146	6
2	Taiwan	3	2	0	1	80	13	67	4
3	Sri Lanka	3	1	0	2	36	107	-71	2
4	Malaysia	3	0	0	3	21	163	-142	0

23 Nov 1986

Taiwan	48–0	Malaysia

Bangkok

23 Nov 1986

Japan	64–0	Sri Lanka

Bangkok

25 Nov 1986

Malaysia	15–33	Sri Lanka

Bangkok

25 Nov 1986

Taiwan	42–17	Japan

Bangkok

27 Nov 1986

Taiwan	28–3	Sri Lanka

Bangkok

27 Nov 1986

Japan	82–6	Malaysia

Bangkok
