= Charlie Higson-Smith =

Hong Kong rugby union player

Charlie Higson-Smith is a Hong Kong rugby union player. He plays for the Hong Kong Football Club and the Hong Kong national rugby union team. Higson-Smith made his international debut for Hong Kong at the 2015 Asian Rugby Championship against South Korea.
