= 2006–07 ARFU Asian Rugby Championship =

2006–07 Asian Rugby Championship
- Date: November 2006 – November 2007
- Countries: 12

Final positions
- Champions: Japan (15th title)

Tournament statistics
- Matches played: 15

This edition, originally scheduled in November 2006 in Sri Lanka was cancelled due to the political situation in the host country. The tournament for title (involving Japan, Korea and Hong Kong), originally must also valid as final pool for 2007 Rugby World Cup – Asia qualification was transferred by International Rugby Board in Hong Kong. The rest of the tournament ("Plate" and "Shield" was played one year after in Sri Lanka.

It was the last edition of the tournament, because from 2008, it was replaced by Asian Five Nations, that merge the ARFU Asian Rugby Championship and the ARFU Asian Rugby Series

The team were divided in three divisions, according to the results of 2006 ARFU Asian Rugby Series

== Tournaments ==
=== Gold ===
Pos.	Team	P	W	D	Lost	For	Ag.	Diff.	Points	Notes
1	Japan	2	2	0	0	106	3	+103	4	Qualified to 2007 Rugby World Cup
2	South Korea	2	1	0	1	23	59	-36	2	Qualified to RWC Qualif. repechage)
3	Hong Kong	2	0	0	2	8	75	-67	0	

19 November 2006

Japan	52–3	Hong Kong

Hong Kong

22 November 2006

South Korea	23–5	Hong Kong

Hong Kong

25 November 2006

Japan	54–0	South Korea

Hong Kong

=== Plate ===
==== Pool A ====
Pos.	Team	P	W	D	Lost	For	Ag.	Diff.	Points
1	Sri Lanka	2	2	0	0	103	13	+90	4
2	China	2	1	0	1	66	32	+34	2
3	Malaysia	2	0	0	2	9	133	-124	0

3 November 2007

Sri Lanka	26–10	China

Colombo

5 November 2007

China	56–6	Malaysia

Colombo

7 November 2007

Sri Lanka	77–3	Malaysia

Colombo

==== Pool B ====
Pos.	Team	P	W	D	Lost	For	Ag.	Diff.	Points
1	Kazakhstan	2	2	0	0	98	21	+77	4
2	Taiwan	2	1	0	1	27	45	-18	2
3	Thailand	2	0	0	2	37	96	-59	0

3 November 2007

Kazakhstan	69–21	Thailand

Colombo

5 November 2007

Taiwan	27–16	Thailand

Colombo

7 November 2007

Kazakhstan	29–0	Taiwan

Colombo

==== Finals ====
===== First Place Final =====
10 November 2007

Kazakhstan	24–17	Sri Lanka

Colombo

===== Third Place Final =====
10 November 2007

China	28–22	Taiwan

Colombo

===== Fifth Place Final =====
10 November 2007

Thailand	44–7	Malaysia

Colombo

=== Shield ===
Pos.	Team	P	W	D	Lost	For	Ag.	Diff.	Points
1	Iran	2	2	0	0	71	10	+61	4
2	India	2	1	0	1	26	39	-13	2
3	Pakistan	2	0	0	2	3	51	-48	0

4 November 2007

India	19–0	Pakistan

Colombo

6 November 2007

Iran	32–3	Pakistan

Colombo

8 November 2007

Iran	39–7	India

Colombo
