= Malaysia national rugby union team =

Malaysia
- Union: Malaysian Rugby Union
- Head coach: Rodney So'oialo
- Captain: Mohammed Syahir Asyraf bin Rosli
- Top scorer: Gooden Ong (36 tries) (until 2018)
First colours	Second colours

World Rugby ranking
- Current: 50 (as of 16 January 2023)
- Highest: 45 (2019)
- Lowest: 55 (2017)

First international
- Thailand 6–47 Malaysia (Bangkok, Thailand; 1955)

Biggest win
- Malaysia 89–0 China (Kuala Lumpur, Malaysia; 31 May 2012)

Biggest defeat
- South Korea 112–5 Malaysia (Taipei, Taiwan; 5 November 1996)

The Malaysia national rugby union team has not played at the Rugby World Cup, but has attempted to qualify since the 1995 World Cup in South Africa.

== History ==
Malaysian Rugby Union (Kesatuan Ragbi Malaysia) is the representative of Malaysian rugby.

== Competitive record ==
=== Asia Rugby Championship ===
Asia Rugby Championship
Year	Division	Position	GP	W	D	L	PF	PA	
2015	DNQ								
2016	DNQ								
2017	DNQ								
2018	1	1	1	0	0	4			third placed
Total	Best results: 'third placed	Appearances: 1/4	0	0	0	0	0	0	

=== ARFU Asian Rugby Championship ===
ARFU Asian Rugby Championship
Year	Division	Position	GP	W	D	L	PF	PA
(Singapore) 1998	Second Division	6/7	3	0	0	3	92	45
(Japan) 2000	N/A	Not Participated						
(Thailand) 2002	Second Division	6/7	3	0	0	3	92	45
(Hong Kong) 2004	N/A	Replaced By Pakistan						
(Sri Lanka) 2006-07	Plate	6/6	3	0	0	3	92	45
Total	Best results: Winners	Appearances: 20/20	76	39	14	23	146	82

=== Asian Five Nations division tournaments ===
Asian Five Nations division tournaments
Year	Division	Position	GP	W	D	L	PF	PA
(Thailand) 2008	Division 2	2/4	2	1	0	1	55	3
(Malaysia) 2009	Division 2	1/4	2	1	0	1	55	3
(Singapore) 2010	Division 1	3/4	2	1	0	1	55	30
(South Korea) 2011	Division 1	4/4	2	0	0	2	37	138
(Malaysia) 2012	Division 2	2/4	2	1	0	1	108	22
(Malaysia) 2013	Division 2	2/4	2	1	0	1	65	30
(Qatar) 2014	Division 2	1/4	2	2	0	0	74	44
Total	Best results: 3rd Division 1	Appearances: 20/20	76	39	14	23	146	82

=== Asia Rugby Championship division tournaments ===
Asia Rugby Championship division tournaments
Year	Division	Position	GP	W	D	L	PF	PA
(Malaysia) 2015	Division 2	1/4	3	3	0	0	119	39
(Malaysia) 2016	Division 1	1/4	3	2	0	1	92	45
(Malaysia) 2017	Division 1	1/4	3	3	0	0	98	39
Total	Best results: Winners	Appearances: 3/3	9	8	0	1	309	123

**Red border colour indicates tournament was held on home soil.
Since 2015, format of the competition was changed.

=== Overall ===
Below is a table of the representative rugby matches played by a Malaysia national XV at test level up until 18 July 2026, updated after match with Philippines.

Opponent	Played	Won	Lost	Drawn	% Won
Algeria	1	1	0	0	100%
Arabian Gulf	2	0	2	0	0%
China	5	3	2	0	60%
Chinese Taipei	9	4	5	0	44.44%
Gibraltar	1	1	0	0	100%
Guam	1	1	0	0	100%
Hong Kong	13	0	13	0	0%
India	4	3	1	0	75%
Iran	2	2	0	0	100%
Junior Japan	6	0	6	0	0%
Kazakhstan	2	0	2	0	0%
Laos	1	1	0	0	100%
Lebanon	1	1	0	0	100%
Pakistan	1	1	0	0	100%
Philippines	4	1	3	0	25%
Qatar	1	1	0	0	100%
Singapore	15	4	11	0	26.67%
South Korea	15	0	15	0	0%
Sri Lanka	21	7	14	0	33.33%
Thailand	38	9	24	5	23.68%
United Arab Emirates	3	2	1	0	66.67%
Uzbekistan	1	1	0	0	100%
Total	147	43	99	5	29.25%

== See also ==
- 1995 Rugby World Cup - Asia qualification
- 1999 Rugby World Cup - Asia qualification
- 2003 Rugby World Cup - Asia qualification
- 2007 Rugby World Cup - Asia qualification
- 2011 Rugby World Cup - Asia qualification
- 2015 Rugby World Cup - Asia qualification
