= South Korea national rugby union team =

Korea
- Emblem: The Mugunghwa (Note: Korean: 무궁화)
- Union: Korea Rugby Union
- Head coach: Ju Ga-ram
- Captain: Lee Jin-kyu
- Most caps: Back Kwang-soo (26)
- Top scorer: Oh Youn-hyung (98)
- Top try scorer: Lee Jin-wook (13)
- Home stadium: Incheon Namdong Asiad Rugby Field
| First colours | Second colours |

World Rugby ranking
- Current: 38 (as of 8 June 2026)
- Highest: 21 (2004)
- Lowest: 38 (2026)

First international
- Taiwan 15–9 South Korea (Tokyo, Japan; 8 March 1969)

Biggest win
- South Korea 135–3 Malaysia (Seoul, South Korea; 23 September 1992)

Biggest defeat
- Tonga 119–0 South Korea (Nukuʻalofa, Tonga; 21 March 2003)

World Cup
- Appearances: 0
Medal record
Men's rugby union at the Asian Games
| Gold medal – first place | 1998 Bangkok | Team |
| Gold medal – first place | 2002 Busan | Team |
- Website: www.rugby.or.kr

Old logo

Men's World Rugby Rankings Top 30 as of 28 September 2026
| Rank | Change (Note: Change from the previous week) | Team | Points |
|---|---|---|---|
| 1 | Steady | South Africa | 93.09 |
| 2 | Steady | New Zealand | 91.15 |
| 3 | Steady | Ireland | 88.08 |
| 4 | Steady | France | 87.43 |
| 5 | Steady | England | 85.68 |
| 6 | ▲1 | Australia | 85.55 |
| 7 | ▼1 | Scotland | 84.78 |
| 8 | Steady | Argentina | 82.24 |
| 9 | Steady | Japan | 77.28 |
| 10 | Steady | Fiji | 76.81 |
| 11 | Steady | Wales | 76.38 |
| 12 | Steady | Italy | 76.30 |
| 13 | Steady | Georgia | 73.94 |
| 14 | Steady | Portugal | 69.39 |
| 15 | Steady | United States | 67.58 |
| 16 | Steady | Chile | 66.94 |
| 17 | Steady | Spain | 66.83 |
| 18 | Steady | Uruguay | 65.75 |
| 19 | Steady | Tonga | 65.14 |
| 20 | Steady | Samoa | 64.73 |
| 21 | Steady | Romania | 62.45 |
| 22 | Steady | Canada | 62.29 |
| 23 | Steady | Belgium | 61.03 |
| 24 | Steady | Hong Kong | 60.74 |
| 25 | Steady | Zimbabwe | 57.68 |
| 26 | Steady | Namibia | 56.96 |
| 27 | Steady | Netherlands | 56.44 |
| 28 | Steady | Switzerland | 55.47 |
| 29 | Steady | Czech Republic | 54.78 |
| 30 | Steady | Poland | 54.54 |

Source: World Rugby
Graph updated to 24 August 2026

The South Korea national rugby union team, (Korean: 대한민국 럭비 유니언 국가대표팀) recognised as Korea by World Rugby, also known as the Mugunghwas, represents South Korea in men's international rugby union. South Korea has yet to make their debut at the Rugby World Cup (RWC).

Korea reached the repechage round of qualification for the 1999, 2003, and 2007 Rugby World Cups, being eliminated by Tonga each time. In qualifying for 2011, South Korea lost every fixture, with its closest match coming against the Arabian Gulf. For 2015, South Korea finished third in the final round, missing qualification directly and to the repechage phase. Similar to 2015, South Korea missed direct or indirect qualification to the Rugby World Cup for both 2019 and 2023. In 2022 South Korea lost to Hong Kong by two points, failing to advance to the repechage qualification play-offs.

== History ==
It is unknown when rugby was first played in Korea. During the mid-19th century, European sailors are recorded as playing some of the earliest games in north east Asia, in ports such as Shanghai and Yokohama in neighbouring China and Japan, but it is unclear whether this occurred in Korea itself. However, it seems certain it had some presence by the mid-20th century. Korea was to become occupied by Japan, the main rugby playing nation of Asia, and it could well have been introduced then. In the amateur days, South Korea maintained a fierce rivalry with Japan.

After World War II, and later, during the period of the Korean War, the large influx of troops from Commonwealth countries cemented its presence. One legacy of this is that South Korean rugby has traditionally been strongest in the army.

However, South Korean rugby has a second string to its bow. The massive growth of the economy since the 1960s, meant that a number of Korean corporations were to set up company teams along the lines of those in Japan, and this has broken up the former dominance of the military.

South Korea made a failed attempt to have rugby union at the Olympic Games readmitted, when they hosted the games in Seoul. Roh Tae-woo, who was South Korean president at the time, had been a player. South Korea have emerged as an important rugby nation in Asia, since they won the Asian Championship in 1990.

Despite having never qualified for a Rugby World Cup (RWC), South Korea were represented in 1995 in South Africa, with Han Moon-soo refereeing the fixture between France and the Ivory Coast.

South Korea's peak, in regards to performances and achievements, are considered to be the 1980s. The team won the yearly Asian Rugby Tournament four times between 1982 and 1990, including three back-to-back tournaments from 1986–1990. Alongside the Asian Rugby Tournament, South Korea also won the inaugural rugby union and rugby sevens tournaments at the 1998 Asian Games in Bangkok, Thailand. In all tournaments South Korea won, they defeated Japan, whom were the most dominant Asian rugby union team at the time and seven-time Asian Rugby Tournament winners. Between 1980 and 1990 Korea held a 4–3 record against Japan.

== Kits ==
=== Kit suppliers ===
The kit supplier since 2021 is Pro-Specs.

| Period | Kit manufacturer | Main shirt sponsor |
|---|---|---|
| | Kappa | POSCO |
| –2015 | Canterbury | |
| 2016 | Le Coq Sportif | |
| 2017–2020 | Under Armour | SEBANG |
| 2021– | Pro-Specs | |

== Notable players include ==
- Lee Ken-yok
- Kim Yeon-ki
- Sung Hae-kyoung
- Kim Keon-young

== Expatriate rugby ==
Expatriate rugby was first played in Korea in 1972. An expat team called the Seoul Wanderers were formed to give opposition to both the local university teams and stationed army teams. This team was made up of players from the UK, New Zealand, and Australia. The team was disbanded in 1976. However, the void caused by a lack of rugby was soon to be filled. In late 1977 Billy Cornett and Brad Handley got together and decided to form a new expat club – the Seoul Survivors. The club is still around today.

Other Expatriate clubs include the Busan Bandits Rugby Football Club (based in Busan), the Ulsan Goblins Rugby Club (based in Ulsan) and the Stars & Stripes Korea Rugby Club (based in Pyeongtaek).

== Record ==
Below is a table of the representative rugby matches played by a South Korea national XV at test level up until 5 July 2025, updated after match with Hong Kong.

| Opponent | Played | Won | Lost | Drawn | % Won |
|---|---|---|---|---|---|
| Arabian Gulf | 3 | 2 | 1 | 0 | 66.67% |
| Australia | 1 | 0 | 1 | 0 | 0% |
| Chile | 2 | 1 | 1 | 0 | 50% |
| China | 2 | 2 | 0 | 0 | 100% |
| Hong Kong | 38 | 15 | 23 | 0 | 39.47% |
| Japan | 36 | 6 | 29 | 1 | 16.67% |
| Junior Japan | 3 | 0 | 3 | 0 | 0% |
| Kazakhstan | 5 | 3 | 2 | 0 | 60% |
| Malaysia | 15 | 15 | 0 | 0 | 100% |
| Netherlands | 2 | 1 | 1 | 0 | 50% |
| Philippines | 3 | 3 | 0 | 0 | 100% |
| Samoa | 1 | 0 | 1 | 0 | 0% |
| Singapore | 8 | 7 | 1 | 0 | 87.5% |
| Sri Lanka | 11 | 11 | 0 | 0 | 100% |
| Taiwan | 14 | 14 | 0 | 0 | 100% |
| Thailand | 11 | 9 | 1 | 1 | 81.82% |
| Tonga | 6 | 0 | 6 | 0 | 0% |
| United Arab Emirates | 4 | 2 | 2 | 0 | 50% |
| Zimbabwe | 1 | 0 | 1 | 0 | 0% |
| Total | 166 | 91 | 73 | 2 | 54.82% |

== Current squad ==
South Korea squad for the 2024 Asian Rugby Championship. Caps updated 23 May 2024.

- Head coach: (South Korea) Lee Myung-geun

South Korean Squad
| Name | Position | Caps | Club |
|---|---|---|---|
| Yang Keun-seob | Loosehead Prop | 0 | (South Korea) Hyundai Glovis |
| Shin Ji-min | Loosehead Prop | 0 | (South Korea) OK Financial Group Okman |
| Kim Tae-woo | Loosehead Prop | 0 | (South Korea) Sangmu |
| Choi Ho-young | Hooker | 4 | (South Korea) Sangmu |
| Lee Seung-eun | Hooker | 0 | (South Korea) Hyundai Glovis |
| Park Gun-woo | Hooker | 0 | (South Korea) OK Financial Group Okman |
| Park Ye-chan | Tighthead prop | 3 | (South Korea) Hyundai Glovis |
| Won Jung-ho | Tighthead prop | 2 | (South Korea) Hyundai Glovis |
| Seo Tae-pung | Tighthead prop | 0 | (South Korea) Sangmu |
| Kim Sang-jin | Lock | 5 | (South Korea) OK Financial Group Okman |
| Park Joon-beom | Lock | 2 | (South Korea) Hyundai Glovis |
| Lee Hyeon-je | Lock | 0 | (South Korea) Hyundai Glovis |
| Seo Jong-soo | Lock | 0 | (South Korea) Sangmu |
| Yoo Jae-hoon | Back row | 9 | (South Korea) OK Financial Group Okman |
| Kim Yo-han | Back row | 4 | (South Korea) Hyundai Glovis |
| Hwang Jeong-wook | Back row | 1 | (South Korea) Hyundai Glovis |
| Kim Chan-ju | Back row | 0 | (South Korea) Hyundai Glovis |
| Yoo Gi-jung | Back row | 0 | (South Korea) OK Financial Group Okman |
| Heo Jae-jun | Scrumhalf | 0 | (South Korea) Hyundai Glovis |
| Kang Min-jun | Scrumhalf | 0 | (South Korea) OK Financial Group Okman |
| Jung Bu-hyon | Flyhalf | 1 | (South Korea) Hyundai Glovis |
| Ko Seung-jae | Flyhalf | 0 | (South Korea) OK Financial Group Okman |
| Mun Jeong-ho | Center | 6 | (South Korea) Hyundai Glovis |
| Lee Jin-kyu | Center | 0 | (South Korea) Hyundai Glovis |
| Lee Yong-un | Center | 0 | (South Korea) OK Financial Group Okman |
| Jeong Yeon-sik | Outside Back | 15 | (South Korea) Hyundai Glovis |
| Shin Min-su | Outside Back | 1 | (South Korea) Hyundai Glovis |
| Kim Chan-deul | Outside Back | 0 | (South Korea) OK Financial Group Okman |
| Baek Jong-eun | Outside Back | 1 | (South Korea) Hyundai Glovis |
