= 2022 Asia Rugby Championship =

- Date: 4 June – 9 July 2022
- Countries: Hong Kong; Malaysia; South Korea

Final positions
- Champions: Hong Kong (3rd title)
- Website: www.asiarugby.com

The 2022 Asia Rugby Championship was the sixth tri-nations series of rugby union matches for the top-level Asia Rugby nations. Due to impacts of the COVID-19 pandemic, the series was cancelled in both 2020 and 2021.

The teams competing were Hong Kong, South Korea and Malaysia. Hong Kong were the defending champions, having won in 2019. The format of the tri-nations series was a double round-robin where the three teams play each other twice on a home and away basis. The team finishing on top of the standings at the end of the series was declared the winner.

This competition works as an Asian qualifier for the 2023 Rugby World Cup. The winner of the competition plays with Tonga to determine the participant for the 2023 Rugby World Cup. Division 3 Central 1 was played from 3 to 6 July in Bishkek, Kyrgyzstan. The losers of the matches on 3 July advance to the 3rd place match and the winners to the final on 6 July. The Asia Rugby Championship Division 3 West will be played in Tehran, Iran from 29 September to 3 October. Iran, Lebanon and Qatar are expected to participate. Originally, it was planned to take place from 9 to 14 May.

== Teams ==
The teams involved, with their world rankings prior to the tournament in brackets:

Nation	Home stadium	City
Hong Kong (21)	Hong Kong Football Club Stadium	Hong Kong
South Korea (30)	Incheon Namdong Asiad Rugby Field	Incheon
Malaysia (49)	National Stadium	Kuala Lumpur

== Fixtures ==
For the details of the matches, refer to 2023 Rugby World Cup – Asia qualification.

=== Play-off ===
4 June 2022
16:30 KST (UTC+9)

South Korea	55–10	Malaysia

Incheon Namdong Asiad Rugby Field, Incheon

=== Final ===
9 July 2022
17:00 KST (UTC+9)

South Korea	21–23	Hong Kong

Incheon Namdong Asiad Rugby Field, Incheon

== Divisional Tournaments ==
2022 ARC division tournaments
- Date: 29 May 2022 – 10 February 2023
- Countries: 11

Tournament statistics
- Champions: Division 2 Pakistan; Division 3 Central; Kazakhstan; Division 3 South; India; Division 3 West Qatar
- Matches played: 10
- Attendance: 3,600 (360 per match)

The 2022 Asia Rugby Championship division tournaments refers to the divisions played within the annual international rugby union tournament for the Asian region.

=== Teams ===
The following teams were announced as playing the 2022 tournaments:

Pre-tournament world rankings in parentheses

==== Division 1 ====
(Note: Asia Rugby Championship Division 1 2022 was originally postponed to December, before being cancelled entirely.)

- ~~Philippines (43)~~
- ~~Sri Lanka (48)~~
- ~~Singapore (55)~~
- ~~United Arab Emirates (60)~~

==== Division 2 ====
- Pakistan (95)
- Thailand (74)

==== Division 3 Central ====
- ~~Afghanistan (NR)~~
- Kazakhstan (62)
- Kyrgyzstan (NR)
- Mongolia (NR)
- Uzbekistan (89)

==== Division 3 South ====
- Bangladesh (NR)
- India (85)
- Nepal (NR)

==== Division 3 West ====
- Iran (NR)
- ~~Iraq (NR)~~
- ~~Lebanon (NR)~~
- Qatar (NR)
- ~~Syria (NR)~~

==== Division 3 South & East ====
(Note: The Division 3 South and East was set to be hosted by Mongolia however cancelled in June 2022 with Mongolia going on to join Division 3 Central)

- ~~Guam (72)~~
- ~~Indonesia (105)~~
- ~~Laos (94)~~
- ~~Mongolia (NR)~~

== Division 2 ==
2023 Asia Rugby Division 2
Tournament details
- Host: Pakistan
- Venue: Punjab Stadium, Lahore
- Date: 29 May – 1 June 2022
- Countries: 2

Final positions
- Champions: Pakistan

Tournament statistics
- Matches played: 2
- Attendance: 600 (300 per match)
- Top scorer(s): (Thailand) Thanapong Punpang (20 points)
- Most tries: (Pakistan) Omair Khan (2 tries)

The 2022 edition of the Division 2 Tournament was held from 29 May – 1 June 2022 in Lahore, Pakistan.

Pos	Nation	Games				Points			Bonus points	Total points
Pos	Nation	Played	Won	Drawn	Lost	For	Against	Difference	Bonus points	Total points
1	Pakistan	2	1	0	1	39	38	1	2	6
2	Thailand	2	1	0	1	38	39	-1	1	5

Matches

29 May 2022
19:30

Pakistan	15–20	Thailand
Try: Bhatti 26', Shahid 65'; Con: Khan 27' (1/2); Pen: Siddique 37' (1/1); Cards: Haroon (yellow card) 7' (red card) 32', Safdar (yellow card) 30' to 40'	Report	Try: Punpang 33', Janda 42'; Con: Raphawee 74' (1/1), Legrand 83' (1/1); Pen: Legrand 8' 24' (2/2)

Punjab Stadium, Lahore
Attendance: 300

Team details

FB	15	Omair Khan
RW	14	Khalid Bhatti
OC	13	Mohammad Aqib Siddique
IC	12	Muhammad Haroon
LW	11	Faisal Aslam
FH	10	Ahmed Waseem
SH	9	Dawood Gill
N8	8	Ali Shahid
OF	7	Anjum Sajjad
BF	6	Ali Khan
RL	5	Dawood Shah
LL	4	Mohammad Waqas
TP	3	Hamad Safdar (c)
HK	2	Israr Ahmed
LP	1	Moiz Shah
Replacements:
	16	Ossama Aslam
	17	Arslan Mir
	18	Mohammad Imran
	19	Arfan Ali
	20	Shoaib Wadood Khan
	21	Muhammad Afzal
	22	Saad Arif
	23	Wasim Abbas
Coach:

FB	15	Natthachack Chumjai
RW	14	Siriwach Kangsawasd
OC	13	Thitipon Jampasri
IC	12	Tanin Compaengyot
LW	11	Samorn Buasod
FH	10	Luc Legrand
SH	9	Arun Rattanakarn
N8	8	Sarut Janda
OF	7	Wasawat Duangjit
BF	6	Patchraraphat Sornritchingchai (c)
RL	5	Nattapong Boonkham
LL	4	Wasintu Thongaram
TP	3	George Willson
HK	2	Spain Panyadee
LP	1	Thammarat Lolek
Replacements:
	16	Thanapong Punpang
	17	Pisit Koknak
	18	Lobsang Dundup Sherpa Subirana
	19	Thanakon Khrukaset
	20	Thirawit Jamenmanee
	21	Ruthapum Rakacha
	22	Thanadej Na Phuket
	23	Pradabyod Mahayod
Coach:

1 June 2022
19:30

Pakistan	24–18	Thailand
Try: Shahzad 50' c, A. Khan 55' m 64' c, Ahmed 75' m Con: O. Khan 51' 65' (2/4); Cards: Siddique (yellow card) 80' to 90'	Report	Pen: Punpang 14' 22' 25' 66' 70', Legrand 48'; Cards: Punpang (yellow card) 40' to 50'

Punjab Stadium, Lahore
Attendance: 300

Team details

FB	15	Omair Khan
RW	14	Muhammad Haroon
OC	13	Mohammad Aqib Siddique
IC	12	Saad Arif
LW	11	Khurram Shahzad
FH	10	Ahmed Waseem
SH	9	Dawood Gill
N8	8	Ali Shahid
OF	7	Anjum Sajjad
BF	6	Ali Khan
RL	5	Dawood Shah
LL	4	Mohammad Waqas
TP	3	Hamad Safdar (c)
HK	2	Israr Ahmed
LP	1	Moiz Shah
Replacements:
	16	Ossama Aslam
	17	Arslan Mir
	18	Mohammad Imran
	19	Shoaib Wadood Khan
	20	Arfan Ali
	21	Mohammad Bilal Akbar
	22	Faisal Aslam
	23	Muhammad Afzal
Coach:
(South Africa) Gert Mulder

FB	15	Luc Legrand
RW	14	Samorn Buasod
OC	13	Tanin Compaengyot
IC	12	Natthachack Chumjai
LW	11	Karanat Nilrat
FH	10	Thanapong Punpang
SH	9	Pradabyod Mahayod
N8	8	Sarut Janda
OF	7	Wasawat Duangjit
BF	6	Thirawit Jamenmanee
RL	5	Nattapong Boonkham
LL	4	Kanjatinun Kaewpadup
TP	3	Thanadej Na Phuket
HK	2	Spain Panyadee
LP	1	Thammarat Lolek
Replacements:
	16	Wasintu Thongaram
	17	Pisit Koknak
	18	Krit Raphawee
	19	Patchraraphat Sornritchingchai
	20	Arun Rattanakarn
	21	Siriwach Kangsawasd
	22	Lobsang Dundup Sherpa Subirana
	23	Thanakon Khrukaset
Coach:

== Division 3 Central ==
2022 Asia Rugby Division 3 Central
Tournament details
- Host: Kyrgyzstan
- Venue: Dolen Omurzakov Stadium
- Date: 3 – 6 July 2022
- Countries: 4

Final positions
- Champions: Kazakhstan
- Runner-up: Uzbekistan
- Third place: Mongolia

Tournament statistics
- Matches played: 4
- Tries scored: 47 (11.75 per match)
- Attendance: 400 (100 per match)
- Top scorer(s): (Kazakhstan) Abdrakhman Nashibayev (Kazakhstan) Magamedrasul Magomedov (25 points)
- Most tries: (Kazakhstan) Abdrakhman Nashibayev (Kazakhstan) Magamedrasul Magomedov (5 tries)

The Division 3 Central Tournament was held from 3–6 July at Dolen Omurzakov Stadium in Bishkek, Kyrgyzstan, they were originally set to host the competition in 2020 however due to the COVID-19 pandemic it was delayed. The tournament was played by Uzbekistan, Mongolia, Kyrgyzstan and Kazakhstan. Kazakstan winning the tournament.

Mongolia were originally set to host the 2022 Division 3 South East & East, however with the cancellation of the tournament they joined Division 3 Central replacing Afghanistan.

Semi-finals
3 July 2022
Uzbekistan	17
Mongolia	10
3 July 2022
Kyrgyzstan	5
Kazakhstan	115

Final
6 July 2022
Kazakhstan	32
Uzbekistan	24
Third place play-off
6 July 2022
Kyrgyzstan	7
Mongolia	69

Semi Finals

3 July 2022
17:00

Uzbekistan	17–10	Mongolia
Try: Khaydarov 20' m 49' c, Karimov 28' m Con: Boev 50' (1/3)	Report	Try: Purenyam 9' m, Nergui 43' m

Dolen Omurzakov Stadium, Bishkek
Attendance: 100

Team details

FB	15	Bekhruz Khamdullaev
RW	14	Giyosbek Turdiev
OC	13	Ulugbek Boev
IC	12	Sergey Kurbanov
LW	11	Umar Usmonov
FH	10	Sobirjon Sobirov
SH	9	Okhunjon Tukhtasinov
N8	8	Abduvoris Karimov (c)
OF	7	Sardor Khaydarov
BF	6	Rustam Namirov
RL	5	Sanjar Safarov
LL	4	Ruslan Ibragimov
TP	3	Shokhjakhon Nobutaev
HK	2	Muhriddin Muminiv
LP	1	Jakhongir Kildoshev
Replacements:
	16	Shehroz Soibanazarov
	17	Akrom Chorshanbiev
	18	Sunnat Mukhametdinov
	19	Olimjon Tulaganov
	20	Bakhitiyor Sirojiddinov
	21	Sobirjon Kholikulov
	22	Timurbek Kamilov
	23	Sharifon Ismoilov
	24	Ahrorjon Mirzaliev
	25	Azamation Qodirov
	26	Vladimir Pavlenko
Coach:
(South Africa) Andre Human

FB	15	Baterdene Batkhuyag
RW	14	Bayarnyam Purenyam
OC	13	Soderdene Bazarsuren
IC	12	Naranbaatar Batsukh (c)
LW	11	Baljinnyam Olivoon
FH	10	Gansaikhan Enkhbat
SH	9	Munkhdemberel Galbadrakh
N8	8	Nyambayar Nergui
OF	7	Javkhlantugs Enkhbat
BF	6	Tuguldur Tsogtbaatar
RL	5	Dulguun Altanjargal
LL	4	Tsogt-Erdene Munkhbayar
TP	3	Unubold Tsolmon
HK	2	Bataa Nyamdorj
LP	1	Natsagdorj Oidovdorj
Replacements:
	16	Gantsolmon Enk-Ekhlelt
	17	Tserenchimed Miyagmar
	18	Bayarmanlai Dorj
	19	Darkhanbat Suvd-Erdene
	20	Enkh-Amgalan Nyamjav
	21	Altangerel Ganbold
	22	Mendamar Gansukh
	23	Ganerdene Batdorj
	24	Sharavjamts Battsagaan
	25	Bayanmunkh Erkhembayar
Coach:

3 July 2022
19:00

Kyrgyzstan	5–115	Kazakhstan
Try: Torobek Uulu 49' m	Report	Try: Niyazov 4' m 51' m 55' c 76' c, Maxim 6' c 9' c 27' c, Timoshin 16' c, Magomedov 19' c 36' 42' m 60' c, Akymbekov 23' m 31' c, Nashibayev 34' m, Scherbakov 65' m, Mussiyatchenko 68' m 80' m, Bolatkhan 75' c Con: Abdrakov 7' 10' 17' 20' 28' 32' 37', Nashibayev 56' 61', Mussiyatchenko 77'

Dolen Omurzakov Stadium, Bishkek
Attendance: 100
Referee: (India) Palak Poddar

Team details

FB	15	Zhyldyzbek Burganakov
RW	14	Arzymat Temirbekov
OC	13	Urmat Torobek Uulu
IC	12	Sergey Jigaylov
LW	11	Artem Kuznetsov
FH	10	Mirzhan Emilbekov
SH	9	Erzhan Mirbek Uulu
N8	8	Bek Khaldar Uulu
OF	7	Bekmurza Bukarbek Uulu
BF	6	Tynchtykek Borbiev
RL	5	Tamirlan Ismailov
LL	4	Artem Kaplan
TP	3	Sansyzbek Nurlanbek Uulu
HK	2	Nikolai Kotlyarov
LP	1	Erlan Tashmamatov
Replacements:
	16	Eldos Orozmatov
	17	Bektursun Makhmud Uulu
	18	Ilgis Doolotbai Uulu
	19	Anarbek Kokum Uulu
	20	Nuraaly Duishenaaly Uulu
	21	Kairatbek Rapiev
	22	Alexander Zolotukhin
	23	Binor Abdazimov
Coach:

FB	15	Abdrakhman Nashibayev
RW	14	Petukhov Maxim
OC	13	Damirzhan Niyazov
IC	12	Daulet Akymbekov
LW	11	Roman Scherbakov
FH	10	Armanzhan Vasilov
SH	9	Alisher Abdrakov
N8	8	Magomedrasul Magomedov (c)
OF	7	Ilyas Mambaev
BF	6	Egor Khromov
RL	5	Onlasyn Tursunbek
LL	4	Yaroslav Mussiyatchenko
TP	3	Timur Timoshin
HK	2	Rustam Kurbanov
LP	1	Alexander Belashov
Replacements:
	16	Daniil Sumskyi
	17	Adam Gadaborshiev
	18	Imam Akhiyat
	19	Kazibekov Damir
	20	Aktilek Bolatkhan
	21	Oleg Guselnikov
	22	Ikhonkin Ruslan
	23	Khanali Mustafaev
Coach:
(Russia) Evgeny Zuev

=== 3rd/4th place Play off ===
6 July 2022
17:00

Kyrgyzstan	7–69	Mongolia
Try: Tashmamatov 75' c Con: Tashmamatov 76' (1/1); Cards: Kotlyarov (yellow card) 39' to 49'	Report	Try: Battsagaan 6' m, Ganbold 13' c, J. Enkhbat 18' m, Bazarsuren 27' m 40' c, G. Enkhbat 49' c, Nyamdorj 53' c, Batdorj 58' c, Purenyam 63' c, Nergui 72' m, Oidovdorj 80' c Con: Enkhbat 14' 40' 50' 54' 59' 64' 80' (7/11)

Dolen Omurzakov Stadium, Bishkek
Attendance: 100

Team details

FB	15	Zhyldyzbek Burganakov
RW	14	Nikolai Kotlyarov
OC	13	Binor Abdazimov
IC	12	Sergey Jigaylov
LW	11	Artem Kuznetsov
FH	10	Mirzhan Emilbekov
SH	9	Erzhan Mirbek Uulu
N8	8	Bek Khaldar Uulu
OF	7	Bekmurza Bukarbek Uulu
BF	6	Tamirlan Ismailov
RL	5	Artem Kaplan
LL	4	Anarbek Kokum Uulu
TP	3	Tynchtykek Borbiev
HK	2	Erlan Tashmamatov
LP	1	Sansyzbek Nurlanbek Uulu
Replacements:
	16	Eldos Orozmatov
	17	Bektursun Makhmud Uulu
	18	Ilgis Doolotbai Uulu
	19	Arzymat Temirbekov
	20	Nuraaly Duishenaaly Uulu
	21	Kairatbek Rapiev
	22	Alexander Zolotukhin
	23	Esen Zhamalbek Uulu
	24	Temirlan Ishenbekov
	25	Aibek Mambetaliev
	26	Urmat Torobek Uulu
Coach:

FB	15	Ganerdene Batdorj
RW	14	Sharavjamts Battsagaan
OC	13	Bayarnyam Purenyam
IC	12	Naranbaatar Batsukh (c)
LW	11	Soderdene Bazarsuren
FH	10	Gansaikhan Enkhbat
SH	9	Altangerel Ganbold
N8	8	Nyambayar Nergui
OF	7	Javkhlantugs Enkhbat
BF	6	Tuguldur Tsogtbaatar
RL	5	Dulguun Altanjargal
LL	4	Tsogt-Erdene Munkhbayar
TP	3	Bayarmanlai Dorj
HK	2	Gantsolmon Enk-Ekhlelt
LP	1	Bayanmunkh Erkhembayar
Replacements:
	16	Bataa Nyamdorj
	17	Natsagdorj Oidovdorj
	18	Unubold Tsolmon
	19	Darkhanbat Suvd-Erdene
	20	Enkh-Amgalan Nyamjav
	21	Munkhdemberel Galbadrakh
	22	Mendamar Gansukh
	23	Baterdene Batkhuyag
Coach:

=== Final ===
6 July 2022
19:00

Uzbekistan	24–32	Kazakhstan
Try: Sobirov 25' c 80' c, Mukhametdinov 47' m, Soibanazarov 71' m Con: Boev 26' 80' (2/4)	Report	Try: Magomedov 3' c, Mussiyatchenko 8' m, Akymbekov 15' c 62' m, Nashibayev 29' m Con: Abdrakov 4' 16' (2/5); Pen: Abdrakov 35' (1/1); Cards: Abdrakov (yellow card) 46' to 56'

Dolen Omurzakov Stadium, Bishkek
Attendance: 100

Team details

FB	15	Shehroz Soibanazarov
RW	14	Giyosbek Turdiev
OC	13	Ulugbek Boev
IC	12	Sergey Kurbanov
LW	11	Umar Usmonov
FH	10	Sobirjon Sobirov
SH	9	Vladimir Pavlenko
N8	8	Abduvoris Karimov (c)
OF	7	Sardor Khaydarov
BF	6	Rustam Namirov
RL	5	Sanjar Safarov
LL	4	Ruslan Ibragimov
TP	3	Shokhjakhon Nobutaev
HK	2	Muhriddin Muminiv
LP	1	Jakhongir Kuldoshev
Replacements:
	16	Akrom Chorshanbiev
	17	Bekhruz Khamdullaev
	18	Sunnat Mukhametdinov
	19	Olimjon Tulaganov
	20	Bakhitiyor Sirojiddinov
	21	Sobirjon Kholikulov
	22	Timurbek Kamilov
	23	Sharifon Ismoilov
Coach:
(South Africa) Andre Human

FB	15	Abdrakhman Nashibayev
RW	14	Petukhov Maxim
OC	13	Damirzhan Niyazov
IC	12	Daulet Akymbekov
LW	11	Roman Scherbakov
FH	10	Armanzhan Vasilov
SH	9	Alisher Abdrakov
N8	8	Magomedrasul Magomedov (c)
OF	7	Ilyas Mambaev
BF	6	Egor Khromov
RL	5	Onlasyn Tursunbek
LL	4	Yaroslav Mussiyatchenko
TP	3	Timur Timoshin
HK	2	Rustam Kurbanov
LP	1	Alexander Belashov
Replacements:
	16	Daniil Sumskyi
	17	Adam Gadaborshiev
	18	Imam Akhiyat
	19	Kazibekov Damir
	20	Erzat Zhwtpisbaev
	21	Oleg Guselnikov
	22	Alexander Lymar
	23	Khanali Mustafaev
Coach:
(Russia) Evgeny Zuev

== Division 3 South ==
2023 Asia Rugby Division 3 South
Tournament details
- Host: India
- Venue: Rabindra Sarobar Stadium, Kolkata
- Date: 19–25 November 2022
- Countries: 3

Final positions
- Champions: India
- Runner-up: Bangladesh
- Third place: Nepal

Tournament statistics
- Matches played: 3
- Tries scored: 37 (12.33 per match)
- Attendance: 2,500 (833 per match)
- Top scorer(s): (India) Gaurav Kumar (25 points)
- Most tries: (India) Gaurav Kumar (5 tries)

The 2022 edition of the Division 3 South Tournament was held from 19–25 November 2022 at the Rabindra Sarobar Stadium, India. India were champions not conceding a single point across the tournament.

Pos	Nation	Games				Points			Total points
Pos	Nation	Played	Won	Drawn	Lost	For	Against	Difference	Total points
1	India	2	2	0	0	168	0	168	8
2	Bangladesh	2	1	0	1	43	94	-51	4
3	Nepal	2	0	0	2	12	129	-117	0

19 November 2022
14:30

India	86–0	Nepal
Try: G. Kumar 2' m 26' c 33' m 80' m, Khatri 11' m 40' c 55' c 57' c, Balmiki 17' m, Saha 39' c, S. Singh 47' c, N. Dagar 64' m, Shukla 70' c, J. Kumar 76' c Con: Saha 27' 39' 40' 48' 56' 58' 71' 77' (8/14)	Report	Cards: Rana (yellow card) , Lamichhane (yellow card)

Rabindra Sarobar Stadium, Kolkata
Attendance: 1,000

Team details

FB	15	Rajdeep Saha
RW	14	Shridhar Shrikant Nigade
OC	13	Dhanasekar K
IC	12	Arpan Chetri
LW	11	Gaurav Kumar
FH	10	Akash Balmiki
SH	9	Gautam Dagar
N8	8	Nitin Dagar
OF	7	Devendra Padir
BF	6	Suresh Kumar
RL	5	Surinder Singh
LL	4	Jitendra Kumar
TP	3	Sanket Sataji Patil
HK	2	Bharat
LP	1	Mannu Tanwar
Replacements:
	16	Suraj Prasad
	17	Harjap Singh
	18	Harvinder Singh
	19	Shivam Shukla
	21	Sukumar Hembrom
	22	Pankaj Barman
	24	Kamal Deep
	25	Prince Khatri
Coach:
(South Africa) Kiona Fourie

FB	15	Suroj Chaudhary
RW	14	Hutraj Pradhan
OC	13	Kapil Sapkota
IC	12	Niroj Karki
LW	11	Suraj Rana
FH	10	Bikram Puri
SH	9	Birat Shrestha
N8	8	Shreeram Shrestha (c)
OF	7	Milan Thapa
BF	6	Sher Bahadur Oli
RL	5	Ramit Bahadur Mal
LL	4	Sujan Kumal
TP	3	Bikash Rana Magar
HK	2	Kshitiz Karki
LP	1	Bibesh Bashu
Replacements:
	16	Anil Majhi
	17	Sewak Kunwar
	18	Anuraj Lamichhane
	21	Bhesh Raj Bastola
	22	Parsharam Rai
	23	Amar Shrestha
	24	Yadu Adhikari
	26	Suman Chaulagain
Coach:
(Nepal) Tanka Raj Giri

22 November 2022
14:30

Nepal	12–43	Bangladesh
Try: N. Karki 75' m 76' c Con: Shrestha 79' (1/2)	Report	Try: Akteruzzaman 23' c 70' m, Biwswas 32' c 80' m, Mahmud 37' c 60' m, Rahman 43' c Con: Mahmud 24' 33' 38' 44' (4/7); Cards: Rahaman (yellow card)

Rabindra Sarobar Stadium, Kolkata
Attendance: 500

Team details

FB	15	Suroj Chaudhary
RW	14	Hutraj Pradhan
OC	26	Suman Chaulagain
IC	12	Niroj Karki
LW	11	Suraj Rana
FH	10	Bikram Puri
SH	9	Birat Shrestha
N8	8	Shreeram Shrestha (c)
OF	18	Anuraj Lamichhane
BF	6	Sher Bahadur Oli
RL	5	Ramit Bahadur Mal
LL	4	Sujan Kumal
TP	16	Anil Majhi
HK	2	Kshitiz Karki
LP	1	Bibesh Bashu
Replacements:
	17	Sewak Kunwar
	3	Bikash Rana Magar
	19	Bikram Bharati
	20	Birat Jung Aidi
	22	Bishal Badu
	13	Kapil Sapkota
Coach:
(Nepal) Tanka Raj Giri

FB	15	Shahiduzzaman
RW	14	Anowruzzaman
OC	13	Akteruzzaman
IC	12	Digonto Sarker Bijoy
LW	11	Sobuz Ali Biwswas
FH	10	Milon Hossen
SH	9	Nadim Mahmud (c)
N8	8	Taniur Hossain
OF	7	Obaidur Rahaman
BF	6	Sohel Ahmed
RL	5	Mehedi Hasan
LL	4	Mahabobur Rahman Dinar
TP	3	Hashib Uddin
HK	2	Milon Hossain
LP	1	Paritosh Chakma
Replacements:
	16	Saddam Hossain
	18	Habibur Rahman
	19	Jwel Rana
	20	Uzzal Chandra Roy
	21	Emad Saruare Khan
	24	Mohammad Khaled Mahmud
	12	Sree Tipu Ranjon Das
Coach:
(Bangladesh) Mohammed Abdul Kader

25 November 2022
14:15

India	82–0	Bangladesh
Try: S. Singh 5' m 34' m 73' c, Dagar 11' m, Tanwar 17' m 58' c, Shukla 21' c, Nigade 37' c 40' m, Prasad 53' c, Kumar 59' c, Hembrom 64' m, H. Singh 66' m 77' c Con: Balmiki 22' 39' 60', Saha 54', Zosangzuala 74' 78'	Report	Cards: Hasan (yellow card) , Shahiduzzaman (yellow card)

Rabindra Sarobar Stadium, Kolkata
Attendance: 1,000

Team details

FB	15	Rajdeep Saha
RW	14	Shridhar Shrikant Nigade
OC	13	Prabal Giri
IC	12	Arpan Chetri
LW	11	Gaurav Kumar
FH	10	Akash Balmiki
SH	9	Sukumar Hembrom
N8	8	Nitin Dagar
OF	19	Shivam Shukla
BF	25	Prince Khatri (c)
RL	5	Surinder Singh
LL	4	Jitendra Kumar
TP	1	Mannu Tanwar Patil
HK	16	Suraj Prasad
LP	17	Harjap Singh
Replacements:
	2	Bharat
	3	Sanket Sataji Patil
	18	Harvinder Singh
	6	Suresh Kumar
	7	Devendra Padir
	21	Zosangzuala
	24	Kamal Deep
	26	Shanawaz Ahmed
Coach:
(South Africa) Kiona Fourie

FB	15	Shahiduzzaman
RW	14	Anowruzzaman
OC	13	Akteruzzaman
IC	12	Sree Tipu Ranjon Das
LW	11	Sobuz Ali Biwswas
FH	10	Milon Hossen
SH	9	Nadim Mahmud (c)
N8	8	Taniur Hossain
OF	7	Obaidur Rahaman
BF	6	Sohel Ahmed
RL	5	Mehedi Hasan
LL	4	Mahabobur Rahman Dinar
TP	3	Hashib Uddin
HK	2	Milon Hossain
LP	25	Mir Raisul Mahmud
Replacements:
	16	Saddam Hossain
	1	Paritosh Chakma
	18	Habibur Rahman
	19	Jwel Rana
	20	Uzzal Chandra Roy
	21	Emad Saruare Khan
	23	Digonto Sarker Bijoy
	24	Mohammad Khaled Mahmud
Coach:
(Bangladesh) Mohammed Abdul Kader

== Division 3 West ==
2022 Asia Rugby Division 3 West
Tournament details
- Host: United Arab Emirates
- Venue: Al Ain Rugby Club
- Date: 10 February 2023
- Countries: 2

Final positions
- Champions: Qatar
- Runner-up: Iran

Tournament statistics
- Matches played: 1
- Tries scored: 8 (8 per match)
- Attendance: 100 (100 per match)
- Top scorer(s): (Qatar) Wade Lotter (15 points)
- Most tries: (Qatar) Wade Lotter (3 tries)
- Player of the tournament: (Qatar) Wade Lotter

The 2022 edition of the Division 3 West Tournament was held on 10 February 2023 in Al Ain, United Arab Emirates. With Qatar winning the competition with 12-40 win over Iran.

Originally due to have taken place May 9 to May 14. Qatar, Lebanon, Syria, Iraq, Iran and Oman where all interested in featuring. Lebanon and Iran both were front runners to host but due to progress made by Iran over the last 6 years they were awarded the position of hosts.

In April 2022 the competition was postponed until the September and was set to be between Iran, Iraq, Lebanon and Syria.

By September the competition was once again postponed this time to October 2022. Iraq, Lebanon and Syria all dropped out with Qatar coming back in. Qatar and Iran were to play two tests on October 8 and 11 in Tehran.

Due to protests from the Iranian team in solidarity with the unrest in the country the competition was once again delayed to February 2023 and reduced to a single test match to be played in the UAE.

Pos	Nation	Games				Points			Bonus points	Total points
Pos	Nation	Played	Won	Drawn	Lost	For	Against	Difference	Bonus points	Total points
1	Qatar	1	1	0	0	40	12	28	0	4
2	Iran	1	0	0	1	12	40	-28	0	0

10 February 2023
19:00

Iran	12–40	Qatar
Try: Yaghoti 76' c 80' c Con: Najafi 77' (1/2); Cards: Farsian (yellow card) 15' to 25'	Report	Try: Lotter 17' c 55' m 69' m, Rakabu 34' m, Bardo 38' c 59' m Con: Tremayne 18' 39' (2/6); Pen: Tremayne 7' 26' (2/2); Cards: Pietersen (yellow card) 21' to 31'

Al Ain, UAE
Attendance: 100
Referee: (United Arab Emirates) Jaco De Wit

Team details

FB	15	Gholamreza Shah Hosseini Aedekani (c)
RW	14	Mostafa Ghodsian
OC	13	Mohammad Namvar
IC	12	Reza Bayat
LW	11	Ali Yaghoti
FH	10	Ramin Najafi
SH	20	Mohammad Ali Esteki
N8	8	Sina Khanzadeh Mohtashami
OF	7	Afshin Seraji
BF	6	Hassan Mardsayah
RL	27	Iman Rajabi Dashtbayaz
LL	4	Shahriar Farsian
TP	3	Mohammad Hossein Anoosheh
HK	2	Amin Biabanzade
LP	1	Mohammad Reza Balali
Replacements:
	17	Ahmad Ataeinazarabad
	19	Mohammad Gholamrezaei
	18	Pouyan Shadkam
	9	Payam Shojaei
	25	Mehdi Abedi
	21	Alireza Nazeri
	24	Majid Bakhtiari
	26	Siavash Ahamadi
Coach:
(Iran) Mahyar Askari

FB	15	Hamza Saied
RW	14	Badre Bakaddouri
OC	13	Iliesa Rakabu
IC	12	Johann-Henry Bezuidenhout
LW	11	Frank Hughes
FH	10	Brook Tremayne
SH	9	James Phillips
N8	8	Dave Ford (c)
OF	7	Guillermo Villegas Bardo
BF	6	Tom Featherstone
RL	5	Ismail El Hatmi
LL	4	Darshan Gangineni
TP	3	Dylan Pietersen
HK	2	Wade Lotter
LP	1	Brett Allam
Replacements:
	16	Abdulaziz Al-Dosari
	17	Nicky Lock
	18	Steve Elumeze
	19	Guy Briggs
	20	Thomas Metcalf
	21	Abdulaziz Alhanek
	22	Oussama Lakhbib
	23	Breda Dreyer
Coach:
(New Zealand) Sam Weber

== See also ==
- 2023 Rugby World Cup – Asia qualification
