= 2023 Asia Rugby Championship division tournaments =

2023 ARC division tournaments
- Date: 30 April - 8 July 2023

Tournament statistics

The 2023 Asia Rugby Championship division tournaments refers to the divisions played within the annual international rugby union tournament for the Asian region. The Asia Rugby Championship (ARC) replaced the Asian Five Nations tournament in 2015. The main tournament is now contested by the top three teams in Asia. The other national teams in Asia compete in three divisions.

== Teams ==
The following teams were announced as playing the 2023 tournaments:

Pre-tournament world rankings in parentheses

Division 1

- Pakistan (91)
- ~~Philippines (41)~~
- ~~Singapore (55)~~
- United Arab Emirates (62)

Division 2

- India (85)
- Kazakhstan (63)
- Qatar (N/A)
Division 3

West

- Iran (94)
- Jordan (N/A)
- Lebanon (N/A)

Central

- Uzbekistan (90)
- Kyrgyzstan (N/A)
- Mongolia (N/A)

South

- Bangladesh (N/A)
- Nepal (N/A)

East

- China (82)
- Thailand (78)

== Division 1 ==
2023 Asia Rugby Division 1
Tournament details
- Host: Pakistan
- Venue: Punjab Stadium, Lahore
- Date: 4–8 July
- Countries: 2

Final positions
- Champions: United Arab Emirates

Tournament statistics
- Matches played: 2

The Division 1 Tournament will be held from 4 to 8 July in Lahore, Pakistan.

Pos	Nation	Games				Points			Bonus points	Total points
Pos	Nation	Played	Won	Drawn	Lost	For	Against	Difference	Bonus points	Total points
1	United Arab Emirates	2	2	0	0	188	3	+185	2	10
2	Pakistan	2	0	0	2	3	188	-155	0	0

Matches

4 July 2023	Pakistan	0–95	United Arab Emirates	Punjab Stadium, Lahore
20:30

8 July 2023	Pakistan	3–93	United Arab Emirates	Punjab Stadium, Lahore
19:30

== Division 2 ==
2023 Asia Rugby Division 2
Tournament details
- Host: Qatar
- Venue: Aspire Warm Up Track
- Date: 30 April – 6 May
- Countries: 3

Final positions
- Champions: Qatar

Tournament statistics
- Matches played: 3

The Division 2 Tournament was held from 30 April–6 May at Aspire Warm Up Track in Doha, Qatar.

Pos	Nation	Games				Points			Bonus points	Total points
Pos	Nation	Played	Won	Drawn	Lost	For	Against	Difference	Bonus points	Total points
1	Qatar	2	2	0	0	67	17	+50	0	8
2	Kazakhstan	2	1	0	1	39	57	-18	0	4
3	India	2	0	0	2	29	61	-32	0	0
Four points for a win, two for a draw, one bonus point for four tries or more (BP1) and one bonus point for losing by seven or less (BP2).

Matches

30 April 2023	Qatar	32–7	India	Aspire Zone, Doha
19:00

3 May 2023	India	22–29	Kazakhstan	Aspire Zone, Doha
19:00

6 May 2023	Qatar	35–10	Kazakhstan	Aspire Zone, Doha
19:00
