= Rugby union in China =

- Country: China
- Governing body: Chinese Rugby Football Association
- National team: China
- First played: Early 20th century
- Registered players: 76,000
- Clubs: 1,012

National competitions
- Rugby World Cup; Rugby World Cup Sevens; IRB Sevens World Series; Asian Five Nations; Rugby union at the Asian Games

Club competitions
- Yellow Sea Cup

Rugby union in China is a growing sport; however, it is still not overly popular. China became affiliated to the International Rugby Board in 1997 and as of 1 July 2019, its women's XV side was ranked 24th and its men's XV side 80th in the world. Neither the women's team nor the men's team has yet qualified for a Women's Rugby World Cup or a men's Rugby World Cup. However, China has hopes of one day hosting the men's event, and World Rugby has indicated it supports taking the event there.

== History ==
Early rugby union in China was often played by expatriates of various rugby playing nations, and colonials. For example, there was a rugby club in Shanghai, where many of these could be found, and there was also a significant presence in Hong Kong, due to the strong connections with the British Commonwealth. The Shanghai club folded in 1952, and the surplus funds were presented to the English RFU for a "Royal Retiring Room", at Twickenham near London.

In the 1930s and 1940s, rugby is said to have been adopted by Chinese military commanders to instil aggression into troops during the war with Japan.

Later, for a period under Communism, rugby was banned in China, with the national Sports Council stating that "the meeting of sullied bodies in physical contact cannot be approved."

In post-Cultural Revolution days, the relative strength of rugby in Hong Kong has helped reintroduce the sport into the PRC, and the head of the HKRFU George Simkin introduced a development programme there.

Chinese delegates were amongst those who went to the centenary congress of the International Rugby Football Board in 1986.

Rugby re-emerged in the PRC in 1990, with a club forming at the Beijing Agricultural University (now merged into China Agricultural University) at Beijing. A professor there, Chao Xihuang was introduced to the sport by a Japanese businessman, and set up a couple of sides. Professor Zheng Hongjun is also credited with the early development of rugby in the 1990s.

The growth of the sport has been massive. For example, in 1991, there were a mere 30 registered players in China. By 1996, there were over a thousand instructors alone.

Today, one segment of Chinese society where rugby is particularly popular is the military. Rugby is an official sport of the People's Liberation Army, with the PLA Sports Institute participating in the highly competitive Hong Kong leagues.

Notable Chinese rugby players include Zhang Zhiqiang ("Johnny Zhang"), who had a stint with the famous Leicester Tigers club in England, and promising young speedster Li Yang, who boasts a time of 10.6 seconds in the 100-metre sprint.

In June 2006, a delegation from Leicester rugby club led by Martin Johnson went on a week-long visit to China to promote the game.

Since the beginning of 2000s, China has concerned more of the rugby sevens instead of the 15-men rugby, due to the Olympic strategy.

== Popularity ==
=== By participation ===
In January 2017, it was reported that China had 76,000 registered rugby players, up 40% on 2014.

=== By interest ===
According to World Rugby, in 2018 China and the US are tied for the countries with the most people either "interested" or "very interested" in rugby union, with 30 million fans in each. This compares to 25 million in India and 15 million in Japan.

This interest has been particularly piqued by rugby sevens. For example, it has been reported that 44 million people in China watched sevens at the Rio Olympics — double the number in the UK and second only to the United States worldwide.

This contrasts with 2015, when Repucom released survey figures suggesting that only 1% of Chinese people were looking forward to the 2015 Rugby World Cup, down from 4% ahead of the 2011 Rugby World Cup.

== Rugby Sevens ==
=== Within China ===
==== Annual ====
Beginning in 2010, two national championships – two-day sevens' tournaments held in different locations – were held every year. However, in 2015, to help the game gain consistent exposure, the China Rugby Football Association divided the annual Sevens National Championships into four legs held in different cities. As a result, according to Cui Weihong, secretary-general of the China Rugby Football Association, "[t]he sevens' action will keep going from April to November with a series of scheduled events. We hope this intensive exposure will attract interest from sponsors and sports marketing agencies to help establish a professional league in the near future."

Since 2013, the National University Rugby Sevens Championship has been organized annually, with 2015's event attracting 12 male and eight female university teams from across the country.

==== Quadrennial ====
In a big boost for the sport, Rugby Sevens debuted in the National Games of China in 2013, at the 12th edition of the event, held in 2013 in Liaoning. The coach of the Chinese women's national team, Ben Gollings, said in 2016 that "[t]he biggest [rugby sevens] competition [in China] is the China Games which is played by all the provinces. This has helped start the development of rugby but when it gets into schools we will see the biggest growth."

During the Liaoning tournament, the women's final between Shandong and Beijing proved controversial when, at the insistence of their coach, Beijing players refused to continue playing, after a try was awarded to Shandong by the Spanish referee. The Beijing team was subsequently fined and later issued an apology.

The most recent National Games of China was held in Tianjin in 2017.

=== China at international level ===
==== Women's Sevens ====
From 2019 to 2020, the coach of the Chinese Women's Sevens team was New Zealander Sean Horan, who previously coached the New Zealand Women's Sevens team at the 2016 Rio Olympics. Since late 2020, it has been Scotsman Euan Mackintosh.

===== Olympics =====
====== Rio 2016 DNQ ======
In November 2015, China qualified for the Final 2016 Women's Olympic Qualification Tournament, an event which would determine the 12th and last team to play at Rio 2016. The tournament took place on 25–26 June 2016 in Ireland. China finished second in its pool, but then lost to Spain in the first play-off match, ending its chance of winning the tournament. It nevertheless went on to beat Samoa and Argentina, to clinch the Plate Final. A video report on the team's preparations for the tournament is available at http://www.worldrugby.org/video/171952

====== Tokyo 2020 ======
China beat Hong Kong 33–0 in the final of the 2019 Asia Rugby Women's Sevens Olympic Qualifying Tournament to qualify for the 2020 Tokyo Olympics. At Tokyo, they made the quarterfinals and eventually finished seventh out of 12 teams.

===== World Cup =====
====== UAE 2009 ======
In October 2008, China finished third (behind Japan and Thailand) in the Asian qualification tournament to book a place in the 2009 Rugby World Cup Sevens. At the UAE tournament in March 2009, China won the Bowl final, beating the Netherlands, Japan, Italy and Brazil.

====== Moscow 2013 ======
In October 2012, China finished second (behind Fiji) in the Asian qualification tournament to book a place in the 2013 Rugby World Cup Sevens. At the Moscow tournament in June 2013, China lost all its pool games but beat Brazil in the Bowl play-offs before losing in the Bowl semi-finals to the Netherlands.

====== San Francisco 2018 ======
In October 2017, China finished second (behind Japan) in the Asian qualification tournament to book a place in the 2018 Rugby World Cup Sevens. At the tournament in July 2018, China finished 12th of 16 teams.

====== Cape Town 2022 ======
In November 2021, China finished second (behind Japan) in the Asian qualification tournament to book a place in the 2022 Rugby World Cup Sevens.

===== HSBC World Rugby Women's Sevens Series =====
After winning the qualifying tournament in Hong Kong in September 2014, China became one of the core teams in the 2014–2015 season. However, it won no pool matches in any of the five events, and finished 11th out of 13 teams, failing to secure automatic core team status for the following season.

In the qualifying tournament in Dublin in August 2015, China lost 27–5 to Ireland in the quarterfinals, so did not gain a place in the main Sevens Series. In the qualifying tournament in Dublin in June 2016, which doubled as the Final 2016 Women's Olympic Qualification Tournament, China lost to Spain (the eventual winner) in the quarterfinal, so did not gain a place in the main Sevens Series. In the qualifying tournament in Hong Kong in April 2017, China lost 28–14 to Japan (the eventual winner) in the quarterfinal, so did not gain a place in the main Sevens Series.

After winning the qualifying tournament in Hong Kong in April 2018, China became one of the core teams again in the 2018–19 World Rugby Women's Sevens Series. However, after finishing last, they were relegated for the 2019–20 World Rugby Women's Sevens Series (in which they nevertheless featured occasionally as an invitational team).

===== Asia Rugby Women's Sevens Series =====
China participates in the Asian Women's Sevens Championship. It has won the Series five times, most recently in 2014. In September 2017, it lost the final to Japan 19–14.

===== Asian Games =====
Rugby Sevens has been contested by women at the Asian Games since 2010. China finished runners-up (to Kazakhstan) in 2010, winners (over Japan) in 2014, and runners-up (to Japan) in 2018.

===== East Asian Games =====
Rugby Sevens was included in the East Asian Games in 2009 in Hong Kong, and China won the tournament. However, the sport was not retained for the Games in 2013 in Tianjin, reportedly due to budgetary issues, and, in any event, the East Asian Games has now been replaced by an under-18s event.

==== Men's Sevens ====
===== Silicon Valley Sevens Tournament =====
The Silicon Valley Sevens was a one-off tournament held a month before the World Rugby Sevens Series season began in December 2017 in Dubai. It was held on 4–5 November 2017 in San Jose, California, USA. China was one of the featured teams, alongside a number of heavyweights like Fiji, New Zealand, Australia, and England. China finished 11 out of 12 teams, beating Tonga 34–10 in the play-off for last place.

===== Shanghai Champions Tournament =====
A Champion of Champions tournament was at one stage planned by Alisports, in conjunction with World Rugby and the Chinese Rugby Football Association.

The first edition was to be played in Shanghai's Yangpu District in late October 2017 with the top eight teams from World Rugby Sevens Series invited to compete, alongside the national team of China, for the highest ever prize money seen in rugby sevens. However, the first edition was then pushed back to 2018, and delays in the roll-out of the Alisports rugby funding suggest the tournament has been abandoned.

===== Olympics =====
====== Rio 2016 DNQ ======
In November 2015, China attempted to qualify Rio 2016, at the 2015 ARFU Men's Sevens Championships held in Hong Kong. However, it finished fifth, behind Japan (which qualified directly for Rio), and Hong Kong, South Korea and Sri Lanka (which went through to the Final 2016 Men's Olympic Qualification Tournament, which would determine the 12th and last team to play at Rio 2016).

====== Tokyo 2020 DNQ ======
The 2019 Asia Men's Sevens Championship doubled as the Olympic qualifying tournament. China was eliminated after losing (after extra time) in the semi-final against eventual winners South Korea. However, because it finished in the top 4 it qualified for the 2020 Men's Rugby Sevens Final Olympic Qualification Tournament, held in Monaco in June 2021 (postponed from June 2020 due to COVID), from which it could have qualified for Tokyo 2020. China had to withdraw from the tournament (which was won by Ireland) due to constraints caused by the pandemic.

====== Paris 2024 ======
The CRFU has as an official objective for the men's sevens team to qualify for the 2024 Olympics.

===== World Cup =====
====== Cape Town 2022 ======
China attempted to qualify for the 2022 Rugby World Cup Sevens through the qualifying tournament in Dubai on 19–20 November 2021. However, they finished 4th, behind Hong Kong, South Korea and Japan, with only the top two teams progressing.

===== HSBC World Rugby Sevens Series =====
China has not yet qualified for the HSBC World Rugby Sevens Series.

===== Asian Sevens Series =====
China has competed in the Asian Sevens Series since it began in 2009. A video of a 2015 match against Thailand is available online. China finished 4th in 2016, 5th in 2017, and 5th in 2018. In some years, the tournaments in the Series include a China Sevens event. China made the final of the 2019 China event, having beaten favourites Japan in the semi-finals, but lost out to Hong Kong by 7–14.

===== Asian Games =====
Rugby Sevens has been contested by men at the Asian Games since 1998. China's best placing was third in 2006. In the 2018 edition, China finished 6th out of 12 teams.

== Rugby XVs ==
=== Within China ===
==== Women's and Men's XVs ====
Rugby XVs does not attract the same level of support as rugby sevens. For example, while the provinces that compete in the National Games of China all have sevens teams, there are no regional XVs sides and no national rugby XV competition. According to the UK newspaper the Daily Telegraph, the decision by the International Olympic Committee (IOC) in 2009 to introduce rugby sevens to the Olympic Games “has effectively halted the development of 15-a-side rugby in China. Beijing reacted by immediately gearing its national rugby system towards sevens, instructing the universities to focus on the format.” Zhang Zhiqiang, the former China national side captain, added in 2015 that “[o]ur national system is geared towards an Olympic strategy, and sevens, as one of the Olympic events, gets more attention.”

==== Youth XVs ====
In June 2016, the inaugural National Youth 15's tournament was held in Qingdao in association with the Qingdao Sharks Rugby Club, one of the first non-university, non-expat rugby clubs formed in China (in 1998). The event was won by Jinan. The president of the China Rugby Football Union stated that the tournament "bodes well for the development of the 15’s game in China as the event has created a lot of interest in other Provinces to host future 15’s tournaments".

==== Clubs ====
There is currently no professional XV rugby competition within mainland China. However, it has been reported that a number of east coast clubs are likely to be part of a proposed league run by the Chinese Rugby Football Association beginning in 2018.

There are a number of amateur clubs which compete domestically for the annual All China Rugby Cup. Teams compete in one of four divisions, based on their location (e.g. the North China division or the South China division). At the end of the season, the top finisher in every division qualifies for the All China Rugby Cup. Meanwhile, the second-place team from each division lands in the four-team China Plate Final.

The 2017 All China Rugby Cup was won by the Shanghai Silver Dragons (of the Shanghai Rugby Football Club) against the Guangzhou Rams, 46–16.

The social clubs are dominated by expatriates, including the Shanghai Rugby Football Club, the Beijing Devils, and the Hangzhou Harlequins. The Shanghai and Beijing teams play domestically but also in the Yellow Sea Cup against a team from Seoul, South Korea.

Some clubs have a native-Chinese base (such as Nongda aka the China Agricultural University and the Beijing Flying Horses Rugby Club) or have made significant efforts to reach out to native Chinese (such as the Qingdao Sharks Rugby Club).

More than 10 universities in China, including the China Agricultural University, Beijing Normal University and South China Agriculture University, have introduced majors in athletic training with rugby as a specialty.

=== China at international level ===
==== Women's XVs ====
The China women's national rugby union team first played in 2006 and continued regularly until 2012. They began playing again in 2019, when they won the Asia Rugby Women’s Division 1 title with victory over both Singapore and the Philippines. However they later (just) lost a two-match playoff against Kazakhstan, so did not gain a spot in the 2021 Asian Women's Rugby Championship (which they won in 2006 and 2011), which would have given them a chance to qualify for the 2021 Women's World Cup. They have not played a test match since.

As of 15 August 2025, China's women's XV side was ranked 27th in the world, despite not having played a test match in six years.

==== Men's XVs ====
===== Ranking =====
The China national rugby union team first played in 1997 and last played in 2019. As of 15 August 2025, China's men's XV side was ranked 93rd in the world. Its highest ranking was 37th, which was achieved in the early 2000s.

In August 2025, the Chinese Rugby Football Association announced that former Argentina U20 head coach Bernardo Urdaneta had been appointed to oversee the relaunch of the men's XV programme.

Because they play so seldom, and with little media coverage, it is difficult to judge the standard of the men's XV team. In 2018, an opponent with experience in club rugby in Dunedin, New Zealand, compared the standard to "Dunedin premier two grade" and stated: "The Chinese side was huge but they were pretty robotic. They just did a lot of pods and it was all pretty slow. Not very expansive." A pod is a group of players who attack the same space together. When it is used correctly, defenders do not know which attacker will get the ball.

===== Asian Rugby Championship =====
China has been as high as Division 1 of the Asia Rugby Championship, most recently in 2008 when it was grouped with Singapore, Chinese Taipei and Sri Lanka. However, between 2015 and 2019, the team was in Division 3 East of the Asian Rugby Championship, alongside countries like Guam, Brunei and Laos.

In the 2019 Asia Rugby Championship division tournaments, China went unbeaten against India and Indonesia, with 137 points for and only 27 against, gaining promotion to Division 2 in the process. Participation in Division 2 enabled the team to attempt qualification for the 2023 Rugby World Cup. However, this opportunity was lost, as the team has not played a test match since.

===== Bilateral Matches =====
China plays in what was intended to be an annual Kublai Khan Cup against Mongolia. In the inaugural match in May 2015, China won 46–19. No further contests for the Cup have been recorded.

===== World Cup =====
In its attempt to qualify for the 2015 Rugby World Cup, China participated in the 2015 Rugby World Cup – Asia qualification, as part of the 2012 Asian Five Nations Division 2. It lost its first match to Malaysia 89–0, and so was eliminated from the qualification process.

China was not eligible to attempt to qualify for the 2019 Rugby World Cup, because only teams in the Top Three (generally Japan, Hong Kong and South Korea), Division 1, and Division 2 of the Asian Rugby Championship can participate in the qualification process.

By winning the 2019 Asia Rugby Championship division tournaments, and gaining promotion to Division 2 in the process, China was in a position to attempt qualification for the 2023 Rugby World Cup. However, this opportunity was lost, as the team has not played a test match since their 2019 victories.

===== Military =====
The People’s Liberation Army XV team represents China in the International Defence Rugby Competition, which is held alongside the Rugby World Cup. It participated in the inaugural 2011 edition, held in New Zealand and Australia. Results included a 59–12 loss to the Tongan Defence Services. However, it did not appear in the 2015 edition held in England or in the 2019 edition held in Japan. According to Simon Chadwick, professor of sports enterprise at the University of Salford, "[t]he Chinese armed forces have been playing rugby [XVs] for a number of years. They have believed that rugby is one of the best ways to develop the skills of their personnel, involving as it does strength, teamwork and decision-making.”

The People’s Liberation Army XV team, which is stationed at the army’s sports institute in Guangzhou, also competes in an annual match against the Hong Kong Disciplined Services team in the TK Lai Cup, named after Hong Kong's Secretary for Security. The match has traditionally been played in December but in 2016 was played during Taipan Day in April, with the PLA replaced by a new Hong Kong team, the Tin Shui Wai Pandas.

The team has also been a part of the second-tier rugby competition in Hong Kong.

==== Youth XVs ====
China did not participate in the Asian Under-19 Rugby Championship held in Malaysia in December 2016 nor in the Asian Under-19 Rugby Championship held in Hong Kong and Sri Lanka in December 2017.

China's national youth team toured New Zealand between 18 and 26 June 2017 to play against Hamilton Boys' High School in Hamilton and to visit the Rotorua Boys' High School Academy and the Bay of Plenty Steamers in Tauranga.

== Efforts to develop rugby ==
=== Positive developments ===
==== Team China Initiative ====
In October 2016, World Rugby announced its Team China initiative, signed in partnership with company Alisports and China's rugby football association. Alisports committed to invest $100m over the 2016–2026 period, in an effort to further popularise both formats of the game.

According to World Rugby, the project was to initially focus on four main goals: (i) Establishment of first-ever professional men's and women's 15s leagues and national sevens programmes (ii) World Rugby's Get Into Rugby mass participation programme (see below) to be run in 10,000 universities and schools in 20 provinces with the target of attracting and retaining one million new players over the next five years (iii) Development programmes to achieve the recruitment and training of 30,000 coaches and 15,000 match officials by 2020 (iv) A major rugby marketing and promotion initiative that would see Alisports invest in nationwide marketing and promotional programmes while carrying rugby content on its TV and digital platforms and Alibaba, the world's biggest e-commerce platform

Progress with the Team China Initiative was slow, however, notably due to "governance changes" within Chinese rugby. World Rugby CEO Breet Gosper stated in April 2018: "I’d have to say it's been slow progress, the partnership. It's slower than we would have liked. Things aren’t [as] easy and rapid in China as we would have liked in the areas we are dealing with. It's been slowed down recently by a change in the government's administrative approach in China and what we have done is put [this programme] on hold for a month or two until we get clarity on who is leading rugby in China." Alisports CEO and founder Zhang Dazhong stated in September 2018: "First we want to cultivate the popularity of rugby in China so we will start with that first, and then once we've started then we will think about the goals, like this $100m promise. We will start with campus rugby first... We will not be involved with any club, federations or national level regarding the sport."

In April 2019, World Rugby announced that the Team China Initiative had finally been abandoned.

==== Get Into Rugby (GIR) Programme ====
In 2017, 140,986 Chinese boys and girls took the GIR programme, learning basic rugby skills. This was the fourth highest GIR figure in the world, behind Colombia (216,341), South Africa (170,919), and India (160,378).

==== IMPACT Beyond RWC 2019 ====
IMPACT Beyond is a World Rugby initiative which has been in place since 2013, and has previously included IMPACT Beyond RWC 2015 and IMPACT Beyond Rio 2016. In May 2017, the IMPACT Beyond RWC 2019 project was launched. It is a partnership between World Rugby, Asia Rugby and the Japan Rugby Football Union and is the official 'legacy' programme for Rugby World Cup 2019. One of its four 'pillars' is 'growing the game across Asia', and as such it appears to have subsumed Asia Rugby's Asia Rugby One Million Project, which uses Get Into Rugby programmes and aims to achieve 1 million new players across Asia (making a total of 2 million) by the start of the 2019 Rugby World Cup (in China, this is being run in 4 locations: Beijing, Shanghai, Liaoning & Shandong).

==== Bilateral Agreements ====
In October 2017, the Chinese rugby football association signed a memorandum of understanding with the Fijian rugby football union, under which Fiji will supply coaches to help develop Chinese sevens and fifteens rugby.

In December 2017, the Chinese rugby football association signed a memorandum of understanding with the Samoa Rugby Union, under which the Samoa Rugby Union will "promote the sport in China and also provide an environment for C.F.R.A. teams to visit and learn from local teams and competitions on [the] island". In this regard, China will take part in Samoa's Marist International Sevens tournament in February 2018.

In May 2025, the Chinese rugby football association signed another memorandum of understanding with the Fijian rugby football union, under which Fiji will supply coaches to help develop Chinese sevens and fifteens rugby. Then CRFA President, Wang Yun, highlighted two key pillars of the partnership and expressed the long-term vision: a Talent Development Framework (utilising Fiji’s elite coaching systems to establish a three-tier national team structure in China aimed at building stronger, more competitive teams for international competition); and a Grassroots Growth Through Competition programme (with Fiji’s support, the CRFA plans to develop a mature competitive framework by launching branded events and expanding rugby’s reach among Chinese youth and communities).

==== Search for China-eligible players ====
In late 2017, it was reported that advertisements had appeared on social media targeting people of Chinese descent living abroad who may wish to represent China in rugby. Already the search has been successful, as "Peter Wong will become the first Fijian to represent China in rugby sevens".

==== Rapid Rugby Championship ====
Australian billionaire Andrew Forrest is launching the Rapid Rugby Championship in 2019, featuring women's and men's 7s and XVs teams from Malaysia, Singapore, Hong Kong, Fiji, Samoa and Japan, who will play in a round-robin format from February–June. According to Business Insider Australia, "Forrest is hoping to expand the competition further in the next two years with teams from China, India, the UAE, Sri Lanka and Korea". This project was abandoned in the wake of the COVID pandemic.

==== New CRFA Leadership ====
In April 2019, Chen Yingbiao was elected as the new president of the Chinese Rugby Football Association (CRFA) and — unlike many of his predecessors — he actually has a rugby background through his athletic association with the People’s Liberation Army (PLA). Chen’s is ambitious: In his opening statement he said he would resign if the Chinese women’s sevens team did not qualify for the Tokyo Olympics.

=== Challenges ===
In 2012, ARFU secretary-general Ross Mitchell was reported as saying that China's rugby administration "find it difficult to field their best team in international sevens competitions because their PLA players are not allowed permission to go overseas".

In 2016, Jin Mengwei, wife of Johnny Zhang and director of a youth rugby camp based at CAU which offers students from nearby primary schools training in sevens rugby, stated that "[t]he biggest challenge is the strong perception among parents and school principals generally that rugby is a dangerous game, even at the junior level, which features the safer touch version and uses protective gear."

In 2016, Xu Fangjie, coach of the Liaoning provincial men's team, said that "[t]he biggest problem is that we don't have enough games to play. If people can't see us play on a regular basis throughout the year, how can we promote the sport?"

Also in 2016, women's sevens coach Ben Gollings referred to "red tape" and also noted, non-judgmentally, that many of the players representing the country grew up playing other sports, and therefore do not necessarily have a personal passion for playing rugby. Similarly, the club captain of the expatriate side Beijing Devils, Steven Lynch, said in 2015 that “[t]here really needs to be deeper roots of rugby at grass roots level for it to succeed in China.”

In 2017, World Rugby decided that, from 2020, the residency requirement to qualify for a national team would be extended from three to five years. One commentator has questioned whether this might make it more difficult for developing nations like China to compete internationally.

In 2018, an ex-pat player at the Wuhan Baiji team in China, Martin Sullivan, was quoted as saying: "The main thing which is actually holding back Chinese rugby is the lack of facilities, lack of grass pitches, lack of trained coaches and lack of understanding of rugby."

In 2019, a Shanghai-based lawyer who played for the PLA team in the early 2000s, Liu Kai, was quoted in the online news magazine Sixth Tone as saying that poor decision-making by China’s sports authorities was to blame, in particular the decision to focus on just one version of the sport (rugby sevens). The magazine noted that, in 2002, "the Olympic Council of Asia decided that only the seven-a-side version of rugby, rugby sevens, rather than the traditional 15-a-side game, rugby union, would be played at future editions of the Asian Games — a decision that convinced the Chinese authorities to halt support for rugby union [XVs], according to Liu. 'This caused most of China’s 15s teams to fade away,' says Liu ... 'The CRFA should be promoting the sport, but they’re not,' says Liu. 'So, us diehard rugby fans are left to do it ourselves' ... China’s sports organizations, meanwhile, should be run by people with real experience and knowledge of the games they are promoting, rather than by bureaucrats, according to Liu."

== Related regions ==
=== Hong Kong and Macau ===
Rugby union has an uninterrupted history in Hong Kong, where arguably the most successful sevens tournament is held. The national team of Hong Kong also participates in the Asian Five Nations. However, Rugby union has a much smaller presence in Macau.

=== Taiwan ===
Rugby union has an unbroken history in Taiwan, but the Chinese Civil War and souring of relations with the mainland has meant that it was effectively cut off.

Nonetheless, Taiwan, competing as Chinese Taipei, has a rugby sevens team that is ranked fourth in East Asia, behind Japan, Hong Kong, and South Korea.

== See also ==
- Rugby union in Hong Kong
- Rugby union in Macau
- Rugby union in Taiwan

== Bibliography ==
- Starmer-Smith, Nigel (ed) Rugby – A Way of Life, An Illustrated History of Rugby (Lennard Books, 1986 ISBN 0-7126-2662-X)
