= Rugby union in Macau =

Activities relating to a sport in Macau

- Country: Macau
- Governing body: Macau Rugby Football Union
- National team: Macau
- Registered players: 1,000
- Clubs: 50

Rugby union in Macau is long established, partly as a result of it being a Portuguese colony. Rugby union is one of the most popular sports in Macau. In contrast to the People's Republic of China, it has had a continuous existence dating back over a hundred years.

Macau has a national side, which competes in international competitions, and there is also Macau Rugby Club, which takes part in various Seniors (adult) competitions . Macau also has a Junior (children's) club, called the Macau Bats Rugby Club, which competes in regional/international tournaments. Beach rugby and rugby tens tournaments have been held in the territory, and the game benefits from rugby's much stronger presence in neighbouring Hong Kong.

A representative national Women's side played in the classification stages of the 2004 Hong Kong Women's Sevens.

== See also ==
- Rugby union in China
- Rugby union in Hong Kong
- Rugby union in Taiwan
- Yellow Sea Cup
