= Choi Seong-deok =

South Korean rugby sevens player

- Full name: Choi Seong-deok
- Born: 31 May 1999 (age 27) South Korea
- Height: 185 cm (6 ft 1 in)
- Weight: 100 kg (220 lb)

Rugby union career
- Position: Lock/Backrow
- Current team: KEPCO
Senior career
| Years | Team | Apps | (Points) |
| 20??-2022 | Kyung Hee University | | |
| 2022 | KAFAC | 5 | (10) |
| 2023- | KEPCO | | |
- Correct as of 19 April 2024
International career
| Years | Team | Apps | (Points) |
| 2018 | South Korea Under-19 | 3 | (0) |
| 2019- | South Korea | 5 | (10) |
- Correct as of 19 April 2024
National sevens team
| Years | Team | | Comps |
| 2020- | South Korea | | 9 |
- Correct as of 19 April 2024

Choi Seong-deok (Korean: 최성덕, born 31 May 1999) is a South Korean rugby union player. He plays club rugby for KEPCO in the Korea Super Rugby League, he has represented Korea internationally at both sevens and XVs.

== Career ==
=== Club ===
Seong-deok joined KAFAC in 2022 after playing for Kyung Hee University where he won Most Valuable Player in the 2021 South Korea Spring University League. While at KAFAC they came 2nd in the South Korean National Sports Festival. After completing his military service, he joined rival Korea Super Rugby League side KEPCO.

=== Sevens ===
He competed in the men's tournament at the 2020 Summer Olympics. Choi represented South Korea at the 2022 Rugby World Cup Sevens in Cape Town, South Africa.

== Honors ==
=== South Korea ===
- Asia Rugby Championship
  - Runners up: 2019, 2022
- Asia Rugby Sevens Series
  - Runners up: 2021, 2022

=== KAFAC ===
- South Korean National Sports Festival
  - Runners up: 2022

=== Individual ===
- South Korea Spring University League MVP: 2021
