= 2023 Rugby World Cup – Asia qualification =

Rugby union competition

Tournament details
- Dates: 4 June 2022 – 9 July 2022
- No. of nations: 3

Tournament statistics
- Matches played: 2

Qualifying for the 2023 Rugby World Cup for Asia commenced in June 2022, with three teams competing for a spot in a Regional play-off match against Oceania 2.

== Format ==
The Asia Rugby Championship, governed by Asia Rugby, is the regional qualification tournament for Rugby World Cup 2023, with only the leading Asian Championship league acting as the process. Three teams will participate across two matches, with the winner of the Asian Cup semi-final progressing to play the highest ranked participating team Hong Kong in the Asian Cup final. The winner of the final will advance to an Asia/Pacific play-off match against the winner of Oceania Round 3, Tonga (Oceania 2).

Originally planned for May 2021, the Championship was postponed due to health concerns related to the COVID-19 pandemic, and had been pushed back multiple more times to allow ample time for teams to participate safely owing COVID-19. This also meant multiple restructures of the competition from a round-robin format home and away to just a single round of fixtures played out of a neutral venue.

In April 2022, the format changed once again, following the withdrawal of Hong Kong, setting up a 2-match play-off between South Korea and Malaysia. However, on 29 April, Asia Rugby confirmed the final format for the competition which included Hong Kong back in the competition.

== Entrants ==
Three teams competed for the Asian qualifiers for the 2023 Rugby World Cup.

Nation	Rank	Began play	Qualifying status
Hong Kong	22	9 July 2022	Advances to Asia/Pacific play-off as Asia 1 on 9 July 2022
Japan	10	N/A	Qualified with Top 12 finish at 2019 World Cup
Malaysia	51	4 June 2022	Eliminated by South Korea on 4 June 2022
South Korea	29	4 June 2022	Eliminated by Hong Kong on 9 July 2022

== Round 1: Asian Rugby Championship ==
=== Cup Semi-Final ===
4 June 2022
16:30 KST (UTC+9)

South Korea	55–10	Malaysia
Try: Kim Hyun Soo 5' c Chang Yong Heung 25' m Jeong Yeon Sik 28' c Choi Seong Deok 47' c Kim Gwong Min (2) 58' m, 64' c Shin Da Hyun 69' c Chae Min Seong 74' c Con: Kim Ki Min (3/5) 6', 30', 49'; Oh Ji Myeong (3/3) 65', 69', 78'; Pen: Kim Ki Min (1/1) 12'	Report; WR Report	Try: Etonia Vaqa Saukuru 79' c Con: Mat Zizi (1/1) 80'; Pen: Mat Zizi (1/1) 14'

Incheon Namdong Asiad Rugby Field, Incheon
Attendance: 5,078
Referee: Craig Chan (Hong Kong)

=== Cup Final ===
9 July 2022
17:00 KST (UTC+9)

South Korea	21–23	Hong Kong
Try: Choi Seong Deok 46' c Kim Kwang Min 63' m Con: On Ji Myeong (1/2) 46'; Pen: On Ji Myeong (3/3) 60', 69', 75'	Report; WR Report	Try: Alexander Post 20' m Matthew Worley 36' c Nathan de Thierry 71' m Con: Glyn Hughes (1/2) 37'; Pen: Glyn Hughes (1/2) 12'; Gregor McNeish (1/2) 80+3'

Incheon Namdong Asiad Rugby Field, Incheon
Referee: Tasuku Kawahara (Japan)

Team details

FB	15	Jeong Yeon Sik
RW	14	Hwang In Jo
OC	13	Lee Soo Pyeng
IC	12	Kim Yong Hwi
LW	11	Kim Kwang Min (c)
FH	10	Kim Ki Min	(substituted off) 40'
SH	9	Lee Geon	(substituted off) 51'
N8	8	Park Joon Young	(substituted off) 62'
OF	7	Noh Ok Ki
BF	6	Kim Yo Han
RL	5	Shin Da Hyeon	(substituted off) 40'
LL	4	Kim Dae Hwan	(substituted off) 51'
TP	3	Kang Sun Hyeok	(substituted off) 57'
HK	2	Yu Si Hoon	(substituted off) 57'
LP	1	Na Kwan Young	(substituted off) 66'
Replacements:
PR	16	Lee Hyen Soo	(substituted in) 66'
HK	17	Choi Ho Young	(substituted in) 57'
PR	18	Shin Ki Soo	(substituted in) 57'
LK	19	Choi Seong Deok	(substituted in) 40'
LK	20	Park Jun Beom	(substituted in) 51'
SH	21	Lee Myeong Jun	(substituted in) 51'
FH	22	On Ji Myeong	(substituted in) 40'
FL	23	Moon Jeong Ho	(substituted in) 62'
Coach:
(South Korea) Lee Myung Geun

FB	15	Jack Neville
RW	14	Charles Higson-Smith	(red card) 1'
OC	13	Benjamin Axten-Burrett
IC	12	Tom Hill		(substituted off) 58'
LW	11	Matthew Worley	(yellow card) 22'
FH	10	Glyn Hughes		(substituted off) 65'
SH	9	Bryn Phillips		(substituted off) 60'
N8	8	Joshua Hrstich (c)
OF	7	Jame Sawyer
BF	6	Jame Cunningham
RL	5	Patrick Jenkinson
LL	4	Mark Prior		(substituted off) 54'
TP	3	Ashton Hyde		(substituted off) 69'
HK	2	Alexander Post		(substituted off) 65'
LP	1	Faizal Solomona Penesa		(substituted off) 57'
Replacements:
HK	16	John McCormick-Houston		(substituted in) 65'
PR	17	Ian Etheridge		(substituted in) 69'
PR	18	Zacceus Cinnamond		(substituted in) 57'
LK	19	Kyle Sullivan
FL	20	Luke van der Smit		(substituted in) 54'
SH	21	Jack Combes		(substituted in) 60'
FH	22	Gregor McNeish		(substituted in) 65'
CE	23	Nathan de Thierry		(substituted in) 58'
Coach:
(Wales) Lewis Evans

Assistant referees:
Noriaki Hashimoto (Japan)
Teruhisa Kajiwara (Japan)
Television match official:
Minoru Fuji (Japan)
