= Chinese Taipei Rugby Football Union =

Governing body of rugby union in Taiwan

中華民國橄欖球協會
- Sport: Rugby union
- Founded: 1935; 91 years ago
- World Rugby affiliation: 1988
- Asia Rugby affiliation: 1988
- Chairman: Chang Fu-Ling
- Website: www.rocrugby.org.tw

The Chinese Taipei Rugby Football Union (CTRFU; Chinese: 中華民國橄欖球協會) is the rugby union governing body in Taiwan. They were founded in 1935 and originally competed as the Republic of China. Because of the complexity around the international recognition of Taiwan, the union competes under the name "Chinese Taipei" rather than as "Taiwan".

== History ==
The Taiwan Provincial Rugby Committee was founded in 1935, and joined the International Rugby Football Board (now World Rugby) in 1986 as the Republic of China. In 1997, the People's Republic of China attempted to join the International Rugby Board with their rugby union but were blocked due to Taiwan's existing membership and usage of the name China with the IRB refusing to allow 2 Chinas. This was because the International Olympic Committee did not recognise rugby union at the time. The British coach of the Hong Kong national rugby union team asked Taiwan if they would be willing to change their name. Taiwan agreed to change their name to the Chinese Taipei Rugby Football Union. The change of name was delayed for a year due to the fact that no one in Taiwan filled in the formal paperwork to bring effect to the change on the grounds that they did not know how to fill in the form.

On 2018, the Chinese Taipei Rugby Football Union alleged that China attempted to have them stripped of the right to host the 2018 U-19 Asia Rugby Championship. In 2024, they joined with the Singapore Rugby Union and Thai Rugby Union to launch the Asia Rugby Unions Cup in order to improve playing standards and reduce travel costs.

== Teams ==
- Chinese Taipei national rugby union team – the men's national rugby union team
- Chinese Taipei women's national rugby union team – the women's national rugby union team
- Chinese Taipei national rugby sevens team – the men's national 7's team

== See also ==
- Rugby union in Taiwan
- Sport in Taiwan
