= Bangladesh national rugby union team =

Bangladesh
- Union: Bangladesh Rugby Federation Union
- Head coach: Mohammad Abdul Kader
- Captain: Md Shahiduzzaman
- Home stadium: Bangladesh Army Stadium
First colours	Second colours

First international
- Bangladesh 31-7 Nepal (Dhaka, Bangladesh, 22 June 2022)

Biggest win
- Nepal 12-43 Bangladesh (Kolkata, India, 22 November 2022)

Biggest defeat
- India 82–0 Bangladesh (Kolkata, India, 25 November 2022)

The Bangladesh national rugby union team represents Bangladesh in men's international rugby union. The team has yet to make their debut at the Rugby World Cup. The team participates in Asian rugby tournaments.

== History ==
The Bangladesh national rugby union team represents Bangladesh in the international levels of rugby football games. The Bangladesh Rugby Federation Union is organizing several age levels tournaments to build a strong foundation in their national team. In 2022 the federation organized the Bangabandhu Bangladesh-Nepal International Rugby Series. Bangladesh won their first rugby series against Nepal with a 3–0 lead in the series. All the matches took place in Dhaka from 21 to 22 June 2022.

== Players ==
S/N	Player	Position	Club
1	Sim Ferdous Alam	Hooker	Bangladesh
2	Md Nazmul Hasan	Hooker	Bangladesh
3	Paritosh Chakma	Prop	Bangladesh
4	Md Nadim Mahmud	Prop	Bangladesh
5	Jewel Rana	Prop	Bangladesh
6	Md Anowruzzaman	Prop	Bangladesh
7	Md Sohel Rana	Lock	Bangladesh
8	Md Shahiduzzaman (C)	Lock	Bangladesh
9	Md Obaidur Rahman	Lock	Bangladesh
10	Akteruzzaman Talukder	Flanker	Bangladesh
11	Mahabobur Rahman Dinar	Flanker	Bangladesh
12	Mohd Sobuz Ali Biswas	Flanker	Bangladesh

== Home stadium ==
The team plays its home matches at the Bangladesh Army Stadium.

Fixture

=== 2022 ===
22 June 2022	Bangladesh	31-7	Nepal	Bangladesh Army Stadium, Dhaka

22 November 2022	Bangladesh	43-12	Nepal	Rabindra Sarobar Stadium, Kolkata

25 November 2022	Bangladesh	0-82	India	Rabindra Sarobar Stadium, Kolkata

== Record ==
Below is a table of the representative rugby matches played by a Bangladesh national XV at test level up until 25 November 2025, updated after match with India.

Opponent	Played	Won	Lost	Drawn	% Won
India	1	0	1	0	0%
Nepal	2	2	0	0	100%
Total	3	2	1	0	66.67%

== Competitive records ==
=== Rugby World Cup ===
Rugby World Cup record
Year	Round	Position	GP	W	D	L	PF	PA
(Australia) (New Zealand) 1987	Did not qualify							
(England) (France) (Republic of Ireland) (Scotland) (Wales) 1991	Did not qualify							
(South Africa) 1995	Did not qualify							
(Wales) 1999	Did not qualify							
(Australia) 2003	Did not qualify							
(France) 2007	Did not qualify							
(New Zealand) 2011	Did not qualify							
(England) 2015	Did not qualify							
(Japan) 2019	Did not qualify							
(France) 2023	Did not qualify							
(Australia) 2027	To be determined							
(United States) 2031	To be determined							
Total	0/9	0 Titles	0	0	0	0	0	0

=== Asia Rugby Championship ===
Asia Rugby Championship record
Year	Position	GP	W	D	L	PF	PA
(India) 2022	Silver	2	1	0	1	43	94
