= Nepal Rugby Association =

- नेपाल रग्बी संघ
- Sport: Rugby union
- Jurisdiction: (Nepal) National
- Membership: 37
- Abbreviation: NRA
- Founded: 1992
- Affiliation: World Rugby
- Affiliation date: 2020 (associate); 2023 (full)
- Regional affiliation: Asian Rugby Football Union
- Affiliation date: 2015(associate); 2018 (full)
- Headquarters: Tripureswor, Kathmandu, Nepal
- President: Dipak Devkota
- Secretary: Gobinda Ghimire

Official website
- nepalrugby.com
- (Nepal)

The Nepal Rugby Association (NRA) is the rugby union governing body in Nepal. It is in charge of the Nepal national team. Also among the Union's chief activities are conferences, organising international matches, and educating and training players and officials.

== History ==
The Nepal Rugby Association began on January 21, 1992, and was registered under NSC in 1995. The first general assembly and election occurred on May 14, 2012. After the first general assembly NRA got recognized nationally and spread rapidly its associations across the nation. Nepal organized first ever national tournament in January 2014.

The General Council of Asia Rugby voted Nepal to be awarded as associate membership at its meeting in Bangkok, Thailand in 2014. Consequently, 7s men's and women's teams registered their debut on the world stage in 2015 at the ‘Asia Rugby Development Sevens’ which is held in Chennai, India. After the debut NRA rapidly increased it is affiliation and marketing across Nepal.

NRA participated for the 1st time in 2022 Asian Games.

== Affiliated associations ==
=== Province & District Associations ===
Province Association	Province	Affiliate District Association	President
Bagmati Rugby Association	Bagmati Province	Kathmandu Rugby Association; Lalitpur Rugby Association; Kavre Rugby Association; Ramechhap Rugby Association; Nuwakot Rugby Association; Makwanpur Rugby Association	Binod tamang
Far Western Rugby Association	Sudurpashchim Province	Kanchanpur Rugby Association; Kailali Rugby Association	Jahendra Dahal
Gandaki Rugby Association	Gandaki Province	Lamjung Rugby Association; Gorkha Rugby Association; Myagdi Rugby Association; Kaski Rugby Association; Tanahun Rugby Association; Baglung Rugby Association	Kumar Thing
Karnali Rugby Association	Karnali Province		Surendra Kuwar
Koshi Rugby Association	Koshi Province		Binod Katuwal
Lumbini Rugby Association	Lumbini Province		Nabin Thapa

=== National Departments ===
- NEPAL ARMY
- NEPAL APF
- NEPAL POLICE

=== Member Clubs ===
- GORKHALI RUGBY CLUB (2016)
- HIMALAYAN TIGER RUGBY CLUB (2017)
- AAKASH BHIRAV CLUB

== Competitions ==
- 15s National Rugby Championship (men's and women's)
- 7s National Rugby Championship (men's and women's)
- U-14, U-16, U-20 championship
- National School Tournaments
- International friendship tournaments

== See also ==
- Rugby union in Nepal - Nepal national rugby union team - Sports in Nepal
