= Macau national rugby union team =

Macau
- Nickname: Bats
- Emblem: Chinese dragon
- Union: Macau Rugby Union
- Home stadium: Centro Desportivo Olímpico - Estádio

World Rugby ranking
- Current: N/A (as of )
- Highest: N/A
- Lowest: N/A

First international
- Macau 0–55 Pakistan (Hong Kong; 31 October 2004)

Biggest win
- Macau 46–7 Cambodia (Hong Kong; 22 February 2005)

Biggest defeat
- Macau 0–55 Pakistan (Hong Kong; 31 October 2004)

World Cup
- Appearances: 0
- Website: www.asiarugby.com/unions/macau/

The Macau national rugby union team, nicknamed the Bats, represents Macau in international rugby union. Macau are a member of the International Rugby Board (IRB), and have yet to play in a Rugby World Cup tournament. Rugby union in Macau is administered by the Macau Rugby Union since 1994, and competes annually in the Asia Rugby Championship.

== Record ==
Below is a table of the representative rugby matches played by a Macau national XV at test level up until 17 June 2006, updated after match with Indonesia.

Opponent	Played	Won	Lost	Drawn	% Won
Cambodia	1	1	0	0	100%
Indonesia	1	1	0	0	100%
Pakistan	1	0	1	0	0%
Total	3	2	1	0	66.67%

== See also ==
- Rugby union in Macau
