= Rugby union in Hong Kong =

Activities relating to a sport in Hong Kong

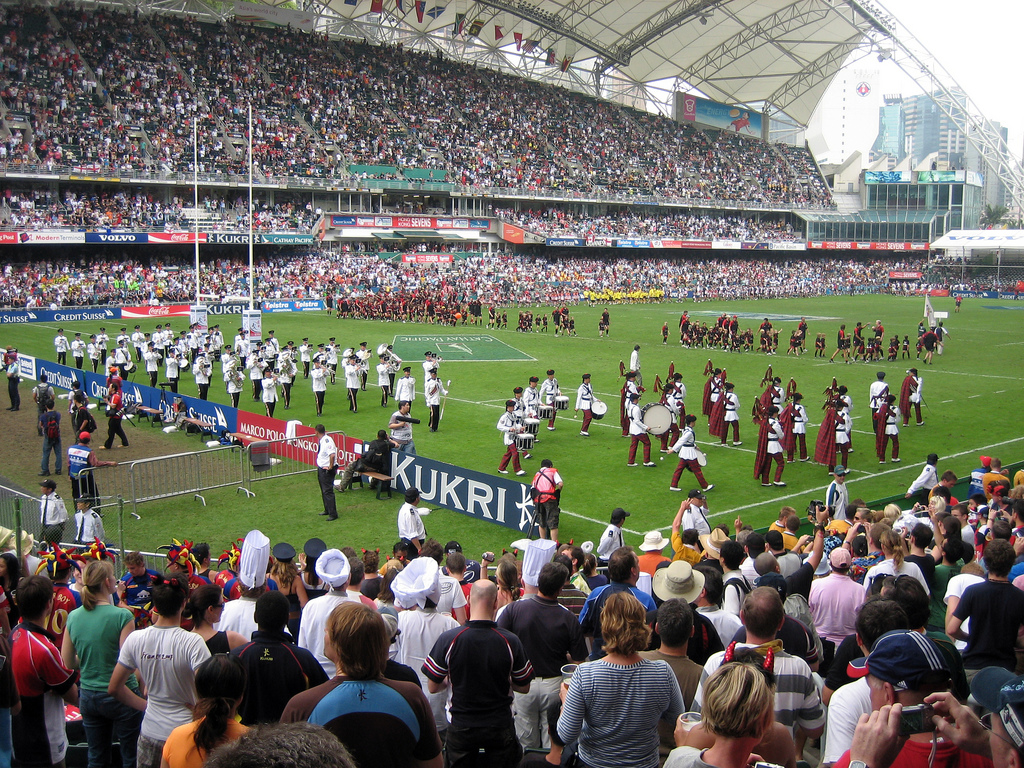
- Opening Celebration of Hong Kong Sevens, 2008
- Country: Hong Kong
- Governing body: Hong Kong China Rugby Union
- National team: Hong Kong
- Registered players: 7,142
- Clubs: 57

National competitions
- Rugby World Cup; Rugby World Cup Sevens; IRB Sevens World Series

Club competitions
- Hong Kong Sevens; HKRFU Premiership

Rugby union in Hong Kong is long established, partly as a result of its being a British colony. Rugby union is one of the most popular sports in Hong Kong. In contrast to the People's Republic of China, it has had a continuous existence dating back over a hundred years, and is most notable for the Hong Kong Sevens tournament, the best known of the rugby sevens tournaments. The top domestic club competition is the HKRFU Premiership.

== Governing body ==
The Hong Kong Rugby Football Union was established in 1952, and joined the IRB in 1988.

== History ==
Rugby football has been played in Hong Kong for over a hundred and fifty years.

Hong Kong is best known for its development of rugby sevens, an abbreviated code from Melrose in the Scottish Borders. Naturally it became popular amongst other groups in the city, particularly other white ex-patriates. Hong Kong Football Club was established in 1886, and played its first game of rugby against a 'Garrison XV' the same year. Prior to that it is likely that ad hoc games were organised by businessmen, such as HSBC. British forces sides would also have been prominent.

Formal competition began in 1910-11 with a 'Triangular' tournament between HKFC, the Royal Navy and Army. This was expanded to a 'Quadrangular' in 1940 with the addition of a side from Hong Kong Police. After WWII the competition recommenced in 1947-48, becoming a 'Pentangular' in 1954 when the RAF joined in, and a year later a 'Hexangular' when the Army split their resources 'North and South'.

Nevertheless, the HKRFU decreed in 1957 that however many teams there might be in the top flight competition, it would be known as the 'Pentangular' - and so it remained until 1975 when a 'Division 1' championship was instigated following the founding of two new civilian clubs, Valley in 1975 and Kowloon in 1976 (having previously competed as YMCA from 1974).

In the late-1980s, the local Chinese began to participate more fully, with the establishment of a Police team of locals, the Duke of Edinburgh Award Scheme (DEA) had a team as did a team of Japanese, Gai Wu. With the booming of the HK economy came more and more expatriates, in 1992 a team of expat old boys of King George V School formed Typhoons and Aberdeen RFC was established in 1993. In the same year a team, with many local players Causeway Bay RFC was established.

Women began playing full contact rugby in 1991, and a women's league, playing 7s, was set up in 1992. After a few seasons playing 10s, women's league is now full XV-a-side.

Rugby caught on slowly but surely with the local population, thanks to HKRFU's constantly improving development programme, and the fact that many more local Chinese had played whilst in overseas education, and simply because rugby has been widely recognised as an excellent game to play.

This fact is clear to see from the explosion of mini rugby in the local population since c.2000. Having previously been established by expat parents in 1979, the game expanded slowly through and the 1980s and became more and more attractive to local families as the 1990s went on. There are now rugby clubs in all parts of Hong Kong, and playing numbers are measure in thousands, if not tens of thousands.

The transfer of Hong Kong from the United Kingdom to the People's Republic of China was not the total disaster for rugby there that some predicted. Since the handover, the Hong Kong Sevens continue to flourish, and there is increasing interest in the game within Mainland China as well.

== Hong Kong Sevens ==
Because of the territory's small size, it was argued that rugby sevens would be more useful in promoting the game than 15-a-side.

The Hong Kong Sevens have proven a powerful missionary force in Asia, allowing nations with small numbers of players to compete at a high level, and improve the standard of their game. Perhaps because of this high profile, Hong Kong was allowed to compete in the Asian Championship, a predecessor to the Asian Five Nations.

Bill McLaren, in his autobiography Talking of Rugby writes at length about his Hong Kong Sevens experiences:

"I remember a big South Sea islander saying that, in his view, the Hong Kong sevens were really the Olympic Games of Rugby Union. Certainly, the Hong Kong event encapsulates all the really good things that the game has to offer —splendid organisation, wonderful sporting spirit, universal camaraderie, admirable field behaviour, the most enjoyable crowd participation, the chance for emergent rugby nations to lock horns with the mighty men of New Zealand, Australia, Fiji, Wales, Scotland and the Barbarians. There is, too, scintillating running and handling which is what the game is supposed to be all about."

The Hong Kong Sevens (Chinese: 香港國際七人欖球賽) is considered the premier tournament on the IRB Sevens World Series in rugby union. The tournament was set up in 1976, and attracted clubs from Asia and beyond, from Indonesia, Korea, Australia, New Zealand, Tonga, Japan, Sri Lanka, Malaysia and Fiji for the first tournament alone. It was held at the Hong Kong Football Club in Happy Valley. After an initial proposal was refused by the Rugby Football Union in England, the HKRFU changed focus and sent out invitations to Asian and Pacific sides.

The Rugby World Cup Sevens have been held twice in Hong Kong - see 1997 Rugby World Cup Sevens and 2005 Rugby World Cup Sevens.

== 2013 British and Irish Lions Tour to Australia ==
The 2013 British and Irish Lions Tour to Australia started with a match against the Barbarians in Hong Kong.

== National team ==
Hong Kong has two 15-a-side teams - men's and women's

The men's team is a third tier rugby playing nation. They first played in 1952, the first local Chinese to be capped was Chan Fuk-ping in 1994. These days, HK players consist of a mixture of both Hong Kong Chinese, and Caucasian players, with some players being mixed race.

They have competed in the first Asian Five Nations recently.

== HKRFU Premiership ==
The 6-team HKRFU Premiership is the top level of competition. The HKRFU Premiership A is the next rung down.

== See also ==
- Rugby union in China
- Rugby union in Macau
- Rugby union in Taiwan
