= Chinese Rugby Football Association =

Chinese rugby union governing body

- Sport: Rugby union
- Founded: 1996; 30 years ago
- World Rugby affiliation: 1997
- President: Zhang Xiaoning

Chinese Rugby Football Association
- Simplified Chinese: 中国橄欖球协会
- Traditional Chinese: 中國橄榄球協會
Transcriptions
Standard Mandarin
- Hanyu Pinyin: Zhōngguó Gǎnlǎnqiú Xiéhuì

The Chinese Rugby Football Association (CRFA) is the rugby union governing body in China. It was founded in 1996. Due to the Olympic strategy of China, CRFA focusses more on rugby sevens instead of the 15-men rugby since the beginning of 2000s.

== History ==
Rugby in China came about from being introduced by British expatriates in Shanghai founding Shanghai Football Club in 1867, that played both association football and rugby. Various iterations of the club went and it was wound up in 1950 following the establishment of the People's Republic of China. In 1988, an Englishman George Simpkin arrived in British Hong Kong and sought to grow rugby in China. He focussed his rugby outreach efforts on the People's Liberation Army (PLA) that occupied former rugby grounds that used to be used by British China Command forces.

After a successful introduction of rugby at Beijing Agricultural University in 1991, the Chinese Rugby Football Association was founded as the China Rugby Union in 1996. The CRU tried to join the International Rugby Board in 1997 though this was initially blocked due to Taiwan's existing membership as the Republic of China due to the International Olympic Committee not recognising rugby union. Simpkin asked Taiwan to change their name to the Chinese Taipei Rugby Football Union, which was agreed to, and the CRU was granted membership of the IRB in 1997.

Initially the Chinese Rugby Football Association focussed its attention on teams based around PLA soldiers and declared in 2000 they intended to qualify for the Rugby World Cup within a decade. However, the Olympic Council of Asia declared in 2002 that only rugby sevens and not rugby union would be played at the Asian Games and later at the Olympics. This led to the Chinese authorities largely dropping their support for rugby union and the PLA teams broke up. In 2006, the CRFA started to rebuild rugby union though most of their players domestically by 2019 were expatriates and students.

== Teams ==
- China national rugby union team – the men's national rugby union team.
- China national rugby sevens team – the men's national rugby sevens team.
- China women's national rugby union team – the women's national rugby union team.
- China women's national rugby sevens team – the women's national rugby sevens team.

== See also ==
- Rugby union in China
- Sport in China
