= Rugby union in South Korea =

- Country: South Korea
- Governing body: Korea Rugby Union
- National team: South Korea
- Sevens team: South Korea sevens
- Nickname: The Mugunghwa
- Registered players: 2,520
- Clubs: 65

National competitions
- Rugby World Cup; Rugby World Cup Sevens; IRB Sevens World Series; Rugby union at the Asian Games

Club competitions
- Yellow Sea Cup; Korea Super Rugby League

Audience records
- Season: Korea Super Rugby League

Rugby union in South Korea is a minor but growing sport. Of the two Korean nations, the game tends to be mostly played in South Korea; North Korea's mostly small rugby union presence is limited to Koreans in Japan.

== Governing body ==
The Korean Union was set up in 1946, and affiliated to the IRFB in 1988.

== History ==
It is unknown when rugby was first played in Korea. During the mid-19th century, European sailors are recorded as playing some of the earliest games in north east Asia, in ports such as Shanghai and Yokohama in neighbouring China and Japan, but it is unclear whether this occurred in Korea itself. However, it seems certain it had some presence by the mid-20th century. Korea was to become occupied by Japan, the main rugby playing nation of Asia, and it could well have been introduced then. South Korea still maintains a fierce rivalry with Japan to this day, which parallels its rivalry in other sports, such as baseball and football.

After World War II, and later, during the period of the Korean War, the large influx of troops from Commonwealth countries cemented its presence. One legacy of this is that South Korean rugby has traditionally been strongest in the army. However, South Korean rugby has a second string to its bow. The massive growth of the economy since the 1960s, meant that a number of Korean corporations were to set up company teams along the lines of those in Japan, and this has broken up the former dominance of the military.

South Korea made a failed attempt to have rugby union at the Olympic Games readmitted when they hosts in 1988. Roh Tae-woo, who was South Korean president at the time, had been a player.

South Korea have emerged as an important rugby nation in Asia, since they won the Asian Championship in 1990. Former President of South Korea between 1988 to 1993 Roh Tae-woo is noted as a Korean rugby player.

=== Rugby in the expatriate community ===
Expatriate rugby was first played in Korea in 1972. An expat team called the Seoul Wanderers were formed to give opposition to both the local university teams and stationed army teams. This team was made up of players from the United Kingdom, New Zealand, and Australia. The team was disbanded in 1976.

In early 1979 Franz Misch, Mike Seros and Brad Handley got together and formed a new club: the Seoul Survivors RFC. The club is still around today.

Today a range of expat teams exist in South Korea which sees teams play rugby 10's in KERA-Korean Expat Rugby Association League. Unfortunately, a few clubs have disbanded due to the nature of expat-life - notably Daejeon and Daegu. Currently four clubs compete in the KERA League - Seoul Survivors RFC, Busan Rugby Club, Ulsan Goblins RFC and the Stars & Stripes RFC (US Armed Forces). Each club has the opportunity to host a tournament and showcase the game in their respective cities. This has led to growing support for the game of Rugby Union. Many players travel considerable distances to practice with, and play for one of the mentioned teams. This is because the pool of players are generally too small to support teams in the smaller cities and country-side of the Republic of Korea.

The Busan Rugby Club is one of the clubs that have experienced rapid growth in player numbers and support. This is because Busan is the second largest city in South Korea, is a popular summer destination (notably Haeundae beach and Gwangali beach) and has a large expat population. The club also draws considerable player numbers from the province located around Busan, Gyeonsangnam-do. Starting in 2016, the Busan Rugby Club showed a huge revival in their efforts to be recognized as a leading expatriate rugby club in Korea, by appointing a qualified coach, focus on training, and winning matches. Their hard work and concerted efforts paid off handsomely when they made history in 2017, by winning the KERA 2017 League trophy (The Joe Day Cup), The South Sea Cup and the KERA 2017 Knock Out Shield for the first time in the club's history. Busan Rugby then repeated their 2017 success by retaining the Joe Day Cup in 2018.

Updated information about the latest match results and current league standings are available at KERA.

== Popular culture ==
In 2024, Netflix Korea aired a reality survivial series called Rugged Rugby: Conquer or Die (Korean: 최강럭비: 죽거나 승리하거나) produced by prominent Korean director Jang Si-won by JTBC Studios. The programme featured seven teams from across the country, including four from the semi-professional Korea Super Rugby League. The shows final episode was aired in January 2025.

== See also ==
- South Korea national rugby union team
- South Korea national rugby sevens team
- Rugby union at the 2002 Asian Games
- Busan Rugby Club

== Bibliography ==
- Bath, Richard (1997). The Complete Book of Rugby. Sevenoaks Books. ISBN 1-86200-013-1.
- Richards, Huw (2006). A Game For Hooligans: The History of Rugby Union. Mainstream Publishing. ISBN 978-18459-6255-5.
