= Matthew Worley =

British academic and author (born 1970)

Matthew Worley FRHistS
- Born: 1970 (age 55–56); Norwich, England
- Education: University of Nottingham
- Occupations: Academic and author
- Employer: University of Reading

Matthew Worley (born 1970) is a British academic and author. He is Professor of Modern History at the University of Reading.

== Education ==
Worley was born and grew up in Norwich, where he attended Heartsease Comprehensive School. He completed his BA and PhD studies at the University of Nottingham, and went on to work there and at the University of Essex, before being appointed to the University of Reading.

== Research ==
Worley has two main fields of historical interest: 20th-century British communism and fascism, and punk and post-punk subculture and popular music. He is a fellow of the Royal Historical Society.

He is founder and co-editor of the journal Twentieth Century Communism. He is also a founding member of the Subcultures Network, a group of more than 5,000 people who research and are interested in subcultural practices.

== CRASH! ==
Since 1997, Worley has worked with the artist and designer Scott King under the name CRASH!. Together, they have published numerous magazines, held exhibitions, made a film and contributed to art shows. In 1999, they formed part of Malcolm McLaren's project to become Mayor of London.

== Books ==
- 2002: Class Against Class: The Communist Party in Britain Between the Wars. I.B.Tauris.
- 2005: Labour Inside the Gate: A History of the British Labour Party Between the Wars. London: IB Tauris. ISBN 9781845113322.
- 2010: Oswald Mosley and the New Party. Basingstoke: Palgrave Macmillan. ISBN 978-0-230-20697-7.
- 2017: No Future: Politics, Punk and Society, 1976-84. Cambridge: Cambridge University Press. DOI 10.1017/9781316779569
- 2024: Zerox Machine: Punk, Post-punk and fFanzines in Britain, 1976–88. London: Reaktion, pp 360. ISBN 9781789148596.

== Edited collections ==
- 2004: In Search of Revolution: International Communist Parties in the Third Period. I.B.Tauris.
- 2005: Labour's Grass Roots: Essays on the Activities of Local Labour Parties and Members, 1918–45. Ashgate Publishing.
- 2008: (with Norman LaPorte & Kevin Morgan) Bolshevism, Stalinism and the Comintern: Perspectives on Stalinization, 1917–53. Palgrave Macmillan.
- 2009: The Foundations of the British Labour Party: Identities, Cultures and Perspectives. Ashgate.
- 2014: (with Evan Smith) Against the Grain: The Far Left in Britain from 1956. Manchester University Press.
- 2015: (with Subcultures Network, as a member). Fight Back: Punk, Politics and Resistance. Manchester: Manchester University Press.
- 2016: (with Mike Dines). The Aesthetic of our Anger: Anarcho-Punk, Politics and Music. Colchester: Minor Compositions. Open Access.
- 2017: (with Nigel Copsey). Tomorrow Belongs to Us: The British Far Right since 1967. London: Routledge.
- 2017: (with Evan Smith). Waiting for the Revolution: The British Far Left from 1956. Manchester: Manchester University Press.
- 2018: (with Subcultures Network) Ripped, Torn and Cut: Pop, Politics and Punk Fanzines from 1976. Manchester: Manchester University Press.
- 2018: (with Jon Puccini and Evan Smith). The Far Left in Australia since 1945. London: Routledge.
- 2021: (with William Henry). Narratives From Beyond the UK Reggae Bassline: The System is Sound. London: Palgrave Macmillan.
- 2021: (with Evan Smith). The British Left and Ireland in the 20th Century. London: Routledge.

== Selected articles ==
- 2000: "The Communist International, the CPGB and the Third Period", European History Quarterly, 30/2.
- 2000: "Left Turn: A Reassessment of the Communist Party of Great Britain in the Third Period, 1928–35", Twentieth Century British History, 11/4.
- 2004: (with Karen Hunt) "Rethinking British Communist Party Women in the 1920s", Twentieth Century British History, 15/1.
- 2007: "What Was the New Party? Sir Oswald Mosley and Associated Responses to the 'Crisis', 1931–32", History, 92/1.
- 2011: "One Nation Under the Bomb: The Cold War and British Punk to 1984", Journal for the Study of Radicalism, 5/2.
- 2011: "Why Fascism? Sir Oswald Mosley and the Conception of the British Union of Fascists", History, 96/1, 66–81.
- 2012: "Shot By Both Sides: Punk, Politics and the End of 'Consensus'", Contemporary British History, 26/3, 333–54.
- 2013: "Oi! Oi! Oi!: Class, Locality and British Punk", Twentieth Century British History, 24/4.
- 2014: "'Hey Little Rich Boy, Take a Good Look at Me': Punk, Class and British Oi!", Punk & Post-Punk, 3/1.
- 2015: "Punk, Politics and British (fan)zines, 1976–84: 'While the world was dying, did you wonder why?'", History Workshop Journal, 79.
- 2016: "Marx–Lenin–Rotten–Strummer: British Marxism and Youth Culture in the 1970s", Contemporary British History, 30/4.
- 2016: (with Nigel Copsey) "White Youth: The Far Right, Punk and British Youth Culture", Journalism, Media and Cultural Studies, 9.
- 2018: (with John Street & David Wilkinson) "'Does it threaten the status quo?' Elite Responses to British Punk, 1976–78", Popular Music, 37/2.
- 2018: (with Kirsty Lohman) "Bloody Revolutions, Fascist Dreams, Anarchy and Peace: Crass, Rondos and the Politics of Punk, 1977–84", Britain and the World: Historical Journal of the British Scholar Society, 11/1.
- 2020: "'If I had more time it could be better, but the new wave's about spontaneity, right?': Finding meaning in Britain's early punk fanzines (1976–77)", Punk & Post-Punk, 9/2.
- 2022: "Whip in My Valise: British Punk and the Marquis de Sade, c. 1975–85", Contemporary British History, 36/2.
