= Nepal national rugby union team =

National men's rugby team of Nepal

Nepal
- Nickname: The Gorkhas
- Union: Nepal Rugby Union
- Head coach: Binod Tamang
- Captain: Shree Ram Shrestha

World Rugby ranking
- Current: ▲95 (as of 4 November 2024)
- Lowest: 96 (2024)

First international
- Bangladesh 31–7 Nepal (Dhaka, Bangladesh; 22 June 2022)

Biggest win
- To be determined

Biggest defeat
- India 86–0 Nepal (Kolkata, India; 19 November 2022)

The Nepal national rugby union team (Nepali: नेपाल राष्ट्रिय रग्बी युनियन टीम) represents Nepal in international rugby union. Nepal is a member of the International Rugby Board (IRB). It is governed by Nepal Rugby Association, which is registered under National Sports Council. Now it is also registered under Nepal Olympic Committee.

== History ==
Rugby is going to be played between Nepal and Bangladesh from 21 to 22 June 2022 at Army Stadium, Dhaka. A team of 25 from Nepal including players, coach, manager and a physio will leave for Bangladesh on 18 June, Saturday. The Rugby 7s and Rugby 15s matches will be played.

Nepali team lost against to Bangladesh team in the first international match on 21 June 2022. This match was an official international friendly match.

== Record ==
Below is a table of the representative rugby matches played by a Nepal national XV at test level up until 22 November 2022, updated after match with Bangladesh.

| Opponent | Played | Won | Lost | Drawn | % Won |
|---|---|---|---|---|---|
| Bangladesh | 2 | 0 | 2 | 0 | 0% |
| India | 1 | 0 | 1 | 0 | 0% |
| Total | 3 | 0 | 3 | 0 | 0% |

=== Players records ===
- First International Score in Official Match:Birat Shrestha on (21 June 2022)
- conversion Shreeram Shrestha

== Captains ==
The following players have captained Nepal in the recent past:

| Captain | Years | |
| Nabin Giri | 2015- | 7s |
| Krishna Thapa Chettri Rasna Gurung | 2017 | 7s |
| krishna Thapa Chettri Alisha Thapa | 2018 | 7s/15s |
| Shree Ram Shrestha | 2023 | 15s |
| Birat Shrestha | 2023 | 7s |
| Sabin Mahat | 2024 | 7s |
| Bikram Puri Srijana Rai | 2025 | 7s |
| Shree Ram Shrestha | 2025 | 7s/15s |

== Coaches ==
The following coaches have led Nepal in the recent past:

| Coach | Years |
| (Nepal) Wijelath Sean Mark Wijesinghe | 2023- |

== Recent matches ==
Matches played in the last 12 months.

21 June 2022
13:00

| Bangladesh | 31–7 | Nepal |
| | Report |

Banggabandhu International Stadium, Bangladesh

19 November 2022
14:30

| India | 86–0 | Nepal |
| | Report |

Rabindra Sarobar Stadium, India

23 November 2025
14:30

| Nepal | 17–25 | Bangladesh |
| | Report |

dhaka national stadium

== Current squad ==
Squad for the Bangladesh-Nepal International 15s Rugby series 2022.

- Suraj Chaudhary
- Sher bahadur Wali
- Bikram Bharati
- Roshan Gharti
- Niroj Karki
- Bikram Puri
- Nabin Maharjan
- Shree Ram Shrestha (Captain)
- Birat Shrestha
- Bibesh Basu
- Sanjib Kunwar
- Prem Bahadur Koirala
- Ramit Bahadur Mal
- Yadu Adhikari
- Amar Sing Shrestha
- Krishna Chhetri
- Suman Chaulagain
- Pujan Phewali
- Jhukendra Rai
- Ram Kishor Chaudhary
- Sujan Kumal
- Hutraj Pradhan
