= Rugby union in Taiwan =

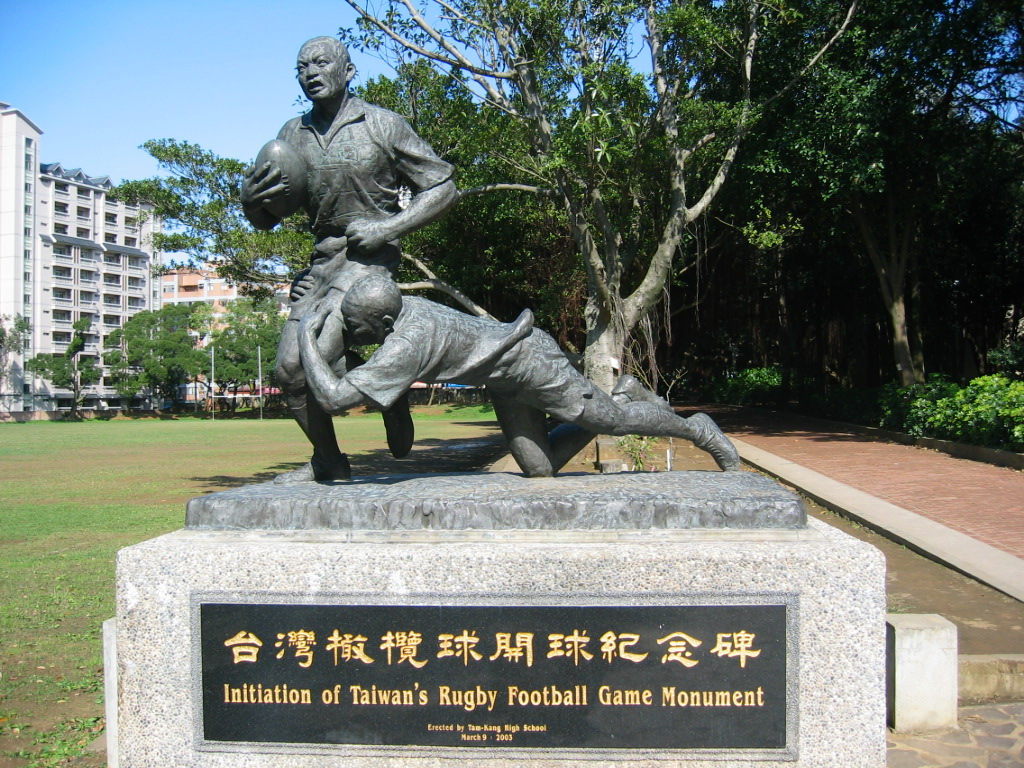
- Country: Chinese Taipei
- National team: Chinese Taipei
- Registered players: 3040
- Clubs: 13

National competitions
- Rugby World Cup; Rugby World Cup Sevens; IRB Sevens World Series; Rugby union at the Asian Games

Rugby union in Taiwan (also known as the Republic of China, and formerly as Formosa) is a significant sport. For political reasons, they compete as Chinese Taipei. As of 2026 the mens team are ranked 61st in the world rankings, and have 3040 registered players. There is currently no national womens team.

== Governing body ==
The Taiwanese Rugby Union was founded in 1946, and joined the IRFB in 1986. Concerning its foundation, the efforts of Ke Zhi-Zhang (a.k.a. Ka Shi-Sho:柯子彰 in Japan) cannot be overlooked.

== History ==
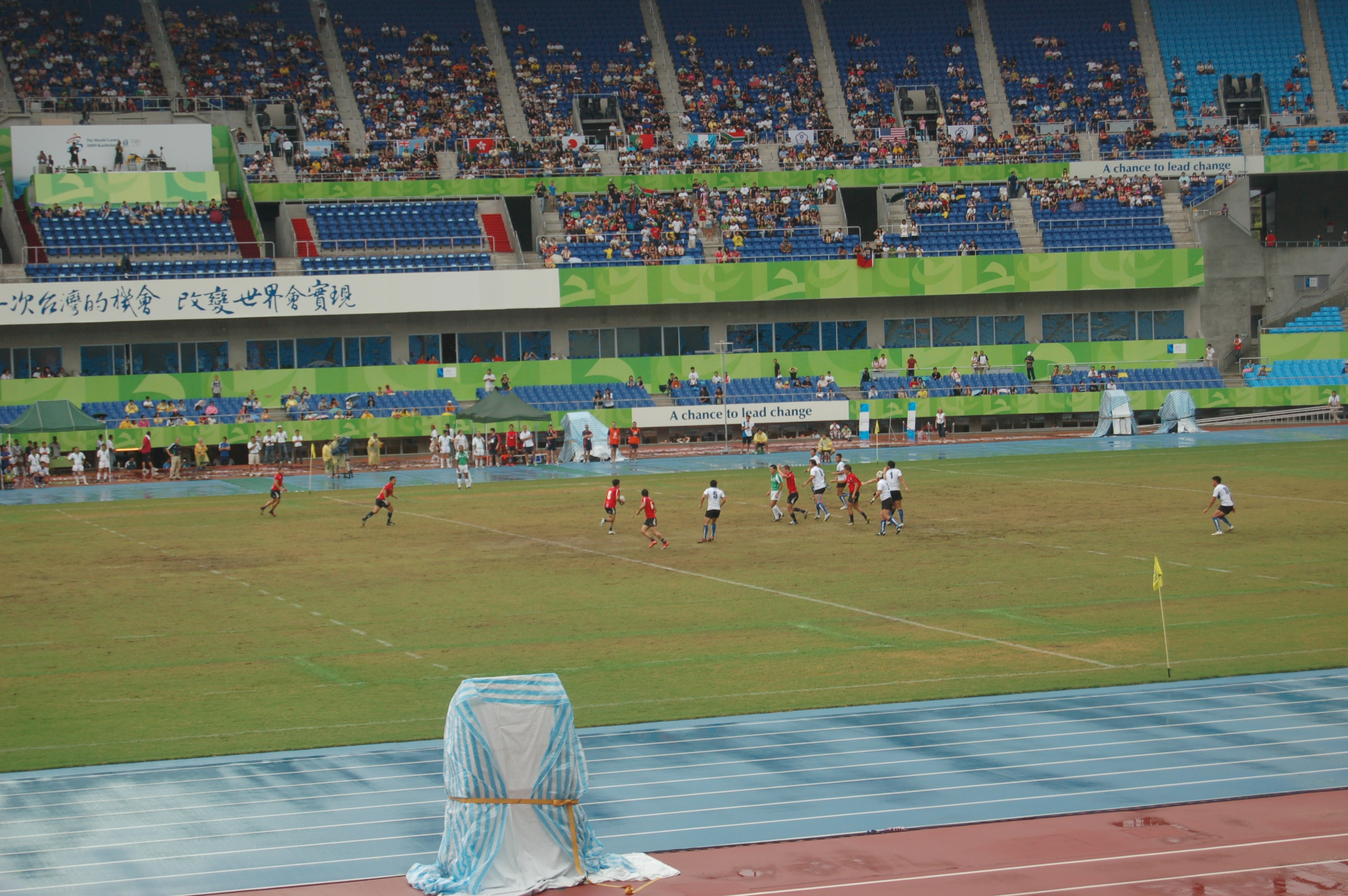
The Taiwan and Hong Kong rugby sevens teams battle it out on the rugby pitch in Kaohsiung's Main Stadium, as part of rugby sevens at the 2009 World Games.

Rugby in Taiwan goes back to the turn of the 20th century, when the island was known as "Formosa". It has been claimed that it was being played even earlier by European sailors (as in mainland China, and Japan).

Unlike the PRC, rugby union has an unbroken history in Taiwan, but the Chinese Civil War and souring of relations with the mainland has meant it was effectively cut off.

The game has a long presence in this part of Asia, especially Japan and Hong Kong. Rugby was also played in Shanghai at an early date, and is played to a high degree in South Korea. Right now, Taiwan is No. 4 in Asia, behind Japan, South Korea and Hong Kong, , although developments in the PRC and Malaysia may change that position.

Not unlike South Korea, Taiwanese rugby has grown with the local economy, and has been tied up with corporate interests. Growing economic links with Japan, a major rugby playing nation, have helped the game in Taiwan from the 1960s to the present. Another thing that Taiwan has in common with South Korea is that it has always performed better at rugby sevens than the fifteen a side game.

During the 70s and 80s, Taiwanese rugby underwent a big development programme, addressing issues such as the shortage of pitches. However, Taiwanese rugby is not short of other resources, and administrators such as Lin Chang Tang have been a great boon.

Traditionally, Taiwan has suffered from a shortage of pitches.

Notable Taiwanese players include -

- Chae Wei-Che
- Chang Chyi-Ming
- Tseng Chi-Ming

=== The Chinese Question ===
Because Taiwan's relationship with the People's Republic of China is complex, it competes under the name Chung Hua Taipei or "Chinese Taipei", rather than as either Taiwan or the Republic of China.

Because of political issues, with some commentators trying to work out how the entry of the PRC into international rugby would affect Taiwan's position. When the PRC joined the UN, it resulted in the expulsion of Taiwan.

== See also ==
- Chinese Taipei national rugby union team
- Chinese Taipei national rugby sevens team
