= Yellow Sea Cup =

Rugby union competition

- Current season, competition or edition: 2012 Yellow Sea Cup
- Sport: Rugby union
- Founded: 2005
- No. of teams: 3
- Most recent champion: (China) Beijing Devils

The Yellow Sea Cup (simplified Chinese: 黄海橄榄球杯; traditional Chinese: 黃海橄欖球杯; pinyin: Huánghǎi Gǎnlǎnqiú Bēi), (formerly known as the China Pub Company Yellow Sea Cup) is an annual rugby union competition currently involving clubs from four cities in China and South Korea.

The competition was launched in 2005 by Simon Drakeford, Ted Gray and Mark Thomas. The Yellow Sea Cup was sponsored by China Pub Company in seasons 2008–09 (that is when its official name was "China Pub Company Yellow Sea Cup").

In total, three teams contest the league. The tournament is held from April to November, with various stages scheduled around domestic club competitions. There were plans to start a second division from 2010, but the idea was abandoned due to lack of sponsorship.

The 2011 tournament was won by Devils of Beijing in Shanghai on November 19 in a match against their arch-rivals, Shanghai Hairy Crabs. This victory made Beijing Devils the most successful team ever, winning the competition four times.

Shanghai Rugby Football Club also participated. They play at the 1,000-capacity SAS Rugby Field.

== History ==
=== Early history ===
The regular fixtures tended to be against the same local opposition which while a lot of fun was repetitive. Other matches were either hosting touring teams or going on tour around Asia and beyond.

With this background, the Chairman of the Beijing Devils Rugby Club, Simon Drakeford, and the President of the Seoul Survivors Rugby Club, Ted Gray were chatting at the annual Manila 10s tournament in March 2004 and quickly agreed we needed to organise a tournament. They quickly brought in one of the founders of the Shanghai Hairy Crabs Rugby Club, Mark Thomas and started hatching plans for a league style tournament.

The plans were developed in 2004. It was envisaged that having regular games between the 3 clubs would allow each club to play a regular scheduled 4 games each year. As there was a cup at stake it was hoped that the competition would give each team a reason to train and a truly competitive game.

The format of playing home and away each year was agreed, with each half of the year having one home game and one away game. Having sorted this out the next big decision was to think of a name for the tournament. A number of options were considered, the Emperor’s Cup was an early favourite. The South East Asia Cup another. Euan “Scottish” Littleford from the Seoul Survivors first suggested the name the Yellow Sea Cup. As soon as it was mentioned, it was unanimously agreed that it was the right name. All teams would be flying over the Yellow Sea to play their games and the Yellow Sea linked together China and South Korea.

=== Season 2005 ===
After much planning, on 14 May 2005, the first Yellow Sea Cup game was played. The Seoul Survivors crossed the Yellow Sea to play the Beijing Devils. In the inaugural year all games ended up being very close. Six games were played and the biggest point’s difference was only 8 points. In three of the six games the score was separated by only 1 or 2 points. The closely fought league was a perfect start to the Yellow Sea Cup. The honour of scoring the first Yellow Sea Cup try went to longtime Seoul Survivor Canadian Brian Bruckman. On the final weekend, the Beijing Devils traveled to Seoul knowing that if they won and secured a bonus point, they would win the league. If the Beijing Devils won but did not get a bonus point Shanghai would win the league by virtue of a better points difference and if Seoul won they would win the Cup. The final result was a Seoul win, and they became the first Yellow Sea Cup champions. The first year’s tournament was deemed to be hugely successful and provided an excellent launch for subsequent years.

=== Seasons 2006-07 ===
The second year was also very competitive. Five of the six games were won by the home team. In the fifth game of the year, the Beijing Devils once again traveled to Seoul in the autumn knowing that a win would secure the cup. This time they won away from home and won the cup. The third year again showed how difficult it is for the teams to travel away. The inevitable costs borne by the players and the Clubs means that often the away team cannot field its best team. The tournament again went down to the last game of the year. This time the Seoul Survivors were traveling to Shanghai in the knowledge that if they won the game they would win the cup for a second time. On the other hand, Shanghai were determined to win so that they would not be on the end of 4 defeats out of 4 games. However, the Crabs also knew that if they won they would hand the tournament to the Beijing Devils. The game was again very closely competed. The Shanghai Hairy Crabs won by 4 points and handed their arch rivals Beijing the Cup for the second year in a row. After 3 successful years, the founders of the tournament felt that it would be a good time to try to bring some new teams into the league. One of the few issues that had arisen in the tournament was that the clubs were finding it hard to persuade players to be visiting the same city each year. A number of different teams were approached and the Guangzhou Rams became the fourth team to join the league.

=== Season 2008 ===
In 2008, the league found a sponsor. The China Pub Company agreed to sponsor the tournament for a minimum of 5 years. Every year, each team is allocated a set amount by the China Pub Company. As new teams join the league, the China Pub Company have committed to support each team for the same amount for as many as 10 teams. The money given to each team allows them to more heavily subsidise players to go on tour. This ensures that the traveling team is more able to field its strongest team ensuring that the competition is more closely fought. The cup games have become the biggest games that the teams play each year. Another essential part of the tournament has been the after games social activities. All hosting teams have ensured that the beer and food has flowed freely and liberally. The drinking games have been as competitive as the on field games, lasting friendships have been forged across the three (now five) clubs.

=== Season 2009 ===
In 2009, another team entered the fray: Macau. The opening game for the tournament saw Shanghai travel to Hong Kong and play out an impressive win in what seemed like a swimming pool for most of the game at King's Park. A surprising result was played out in Guangzhou where the Beijing Devils lost out to the Rams in a hard-fought game. Next saw a strong and agile team come down to Shanghai which looked like being the decider for the tournament. In a close and often tense game the ex Taipei Baboons player Adrian scored underneath the posts to take the Crabs into half-time up 10-8. The final kick of the game was retaken after one of the crabs players charged the penalty down, but the kick was missed again, and the Crabs won the game. The Rams were then meant to have travelled to Shanghai but could not make it and the Devils travelled to Seoul and held out for 60 minutes, but the Survivors were too strong for them and came out victors. Next came the final round where Shanghai had to overcome their voodoo in Beijing by beating them to retain the cup. Having gone 9-3 down it was looking tough, but the Crabs class and power overcame a tiring Devils pack to push to victory and complete an historic double, and underline their often quoted title as 'Best Team in China'.

== Fixtures 2005-2011 ==
2005 Fixtures

Date	Home	Score	Away
14 May	(China) Beijing Devils	7 – 5	(South Korea) Seoul Survivors
21 May	(China) Shanghai Hairy Crabs	12 – 6	(China) Beijing Devils
4 Jun	(South Korea) Seoul Survivors	13 – 12	(China) Shanghai Hairy Crabs
24 Sep	(China) Beijing Devils	7 – 15	(China) Shanghai Hairy Crabs
29 Oct	(China) Shanghai Hairy Crabs	7 – 8	(South Korea) Seoul Survivors
12 Nov	(South Korea) Seoul Survivors	22 – 14	(China) Beijing Devils

	Pld	W	D	L	PF	PA	Tries	BP	Pts
(South Korea) Seoul Survivors	4	3	0	1	48	40	7	1	10
(China) Shanghai Hairy Crabs	4	2	0	2	46	34	7	0	8
(China) Beijing Devils	4	1	0	3	34	54	4	0	6

2006 Fixtures

Date	Home	Score	Away
15 Apr	(China) Shanghai Hairy Crabs	18 – 5	(China) Beijing Devils
13 May	(China) Beijing Devils	Forfeited by Seoul	(South Korea) Seoul Survivors
3 Jun	(South Korea) Seoul Survivors	24 – 22	(China) Shanghai Hairy Crabs
23 Sep	(China) Beijing Devils	13 – 3	(China) Shanghai Hairy Crabs
4 Nov	(South Korea) Seoul Survivors	19 – 24	(China) Beijing Devils
2 Dec	(China) Shanghai Hairy Crabs	29 – 5	(South Korea) Seoul Survivors

	Pld	W	D	L	PF	PA	Tries	BP	Pts
(China) Beijing Devils	4	3	0	1	42	40	7	1	11
(China) Shanghai Hairy Crabs	4	2	0	2	72	47	10	1	9
(South Korea) Seoul Survivors	4	1	0	3	48	75	8	-2	4

2007 Fixtures

Date	Home	Score	Away
14 Apr	(China) Shanghai Hairy Crabs	7 – 11	(China) Beijing Devils
19 May	(South Korea) Seoul Survivors	39 – 8	(China) Shanghai Hairy Crabs
2 Jun	(China) Beijing Devils	7 – 8	(South Korea) Seoul Survivors
29 Sep	(China) Beijing Devils	22 – 0	(China) Shanghai Hairy Crabs
27 Oct	(South Korea) Seoul Survivors	3 – 16	(China) Beijing Devils
8 Dec	(China) Shanghai Hairy Crabs	20 – 16	(South Korea) Seoul Survivors

	Pld	W	D	L	PF	PA	Tries	BP	Pts
(China) Beijing Devils	4	3	0	1	56	18	8	1	11
(South Korea) Seoul Survivors	4	2	0	2	66	51	12	1	9
(China) Shanghai Hairy Crabs	4	1	0	3	35	88	4	0	6

2008 Fixtures

Date	Home	Score	Away
3 May	(China) Guangzhou Rams	22 – 48	(China) Beijing Devils
24 May	(China) Guangzhou Rams	12 – 36	(China) Shanghai Hairy Crabs
31 May	(China) Beijing Devils	42 – 5	(South Korea) Seoul Survivors
14 Jun	(South Korea) Seoul Survivors	17 – 28	(China) Shanghai Hairy Crabs
31 Oct	(South Korea) Seoul Survivors	30 – 10	(China) Guangzhou Rams
31 Oct	(China) Shanghai Hairy Crabs	20 – 5	(China) Beijing Devils

	Pld	W	D	L	PF	PA	Tries	BP	Pts
(China) Shanghai Hairy Crabs	3	3	0	0	84	34	10	1	13
(China) Beijing Devils	3	2	0	1	95	47	15	2	10
(South Korea) Seoul Survivors	3	1	0	2	52	80	9	1	5
(China) Guangzhou Rams	3	0	0	3	44	114	8	1	1

2009 Fixtures

Date	Home	Score	Away
18 Apr	Macau Rugby Club	23 – 40	(China) Shanghai Hairy Crabs
1 May	(China) Guangzhou Rams	15 – 6	(China) Beijing Devils
23 May	(China) Beijing Devils	62 – 14	Macau Rugby Club
23 May	(China) Shanghai Hairy Crabs	10 – 8	(South Korea) Seoul Survivors
6 Jun	(South Korea) Seoul Survivors	71 - 0	(China) Guangzhou Rams
24 Oct	(South Korea) Seoul Survivors	22 - 3	(China) Beijing Devils
n/a	(China) Shanghai Hairy Crabs	25 - 0*; *Forfeited by Guangzhou	(China) Guangzhou Rams
7 Nov	(China) Beijing Devils	16 - 29	(China) Shanghai Hairy Crabs
n/a	(China) Guangzhou Rams	0 - 0*; *Forfeited by Guangzhou and Macau	Macau Rugby Club
n/a	Macau Rugby Club	0 - 25*; *Forfeited by Macau	(South Korea) Seoul Survivors

	Pld	W	D	L	PF	PA	PD	BP	Pts
(China) Shanghai Hairy Crabs	4	4	0	0	104	47	57	2	18
(South Korea) Seoul Survivors	4	3	0	1	126	13	113	2	14
(China) Beijing Devils	4	1	0	3	87	80	7	1	5
(China) Guangzhou Rams	4	1	1	2	15	127	-112	-3	1
Macau Rugby Club	4	0	1	3	37	102	-65	-1	-1

2010 Fixtures

Date	Home	Score	Away
24 Apr	(China) Guangzhou Rams	20 - 25	(South Korea) Seoul Survivors
29 May	(South Korea) Seoul Survivors	17 – 14	(China) Shanghai Hairy Crabs
5 Jun	(China) Beijing Devils	35 - 26	(China) Guangzhou Rams
16 Oct	(China) Beijing Devils	25 - 17	(South Korea) Seoul Survivors
13 Nov	(China) Shanghai Hairy Crabs	5 - 11	(China) Beijing Devils
20 Nov	(China) Guangzhou Rams	0 - 40	(China) Shanghai Hairy Crabs

	Pld	W	D	L	PF	PA	PD	BP	Pts
(China) Beijing Devils	3	3	0	0	71	48	+13	1	13
(South Korea) Seoul Survivors	3	2	0	1	59	59	0	0	8
(China) Shanghai Hairy Crabs	3	1	0	2	59	28	+31	3	7
(China) Guangzhou Rams	3	0	0	3	46	99	-53	3	3

2011 Fixtures

Date	Home	Score	Away
11 Jun	(South Korea) Seoul Survivors	3 - 9	(China) Beijing Devils
26 Nov	(South Korea) Seoul Survivors	10 - 41	(China) Shanghai Hairy Crabs
19 Nov	(China) Shanghai Hairy Crabs	7 - 10	(China) Beijing Devils

	Pld	W	D	L	PF	PA	PD	BP	Pts
(China) Beijing Devils	2	2	0	0	19	10	9	0	8
(China) Shanghai Hairy Crabs	2	1	0	1	48	20	28	2	6
(South Korea) Seoul Survivors	2	0	0	2	13	50	-37	1	1

== Points rules ==
- Points are awarded on the following basis:
- Win: 4 points
- Draw: 2 points
- 1 bonus point for a loss within 7 points or less of the team that wins
- 1 bonus point for scoring 4 tries or more in a match

== Team records ==
- Highest score: 71 points – Survivors defeated Rams 71-0, 2009
- Lowest score: 0 points - Survivors defeated Rams 71-0, 2009
- Highest combined score: 76 points - Devils defeated Macau 62-14, 2009
- Lowest combined score: 12 points - Devils defeated Survivors 7-5, 2005 and 2011
- Highest winning margin: 71 points – Survivors defeated Rams 71-0, 2009
- Highest score away: 40 points – Hairy Crabs defeated Rams 40-0, 2010
- Most consecutive wins: 8 wins – Hairy Crabs, 2007/09
- Most consecutive losses: 5 losses – Rams, 2009/10
- Most tries in a match: 13 tries – Survivors defeated Rams 71-0, 2009
- Most tries in a season: 20 tries – Survivors, 2009
- Fewest tries in a season: 2 tries – Survivors, 2011
- Most wins in a row at home: 4 wins – Hairy Crabs, 2007/09 (Includes bye against the Rams)
- Most wins in a row away: 4 wins – Hairy Crabs, 2007/09
