= Rabindra Sarobar Stadium =

Sports stadium in Kolkata, India

Coordinates: 22°30′42″N 88°21′08″E

- Lake Stadium
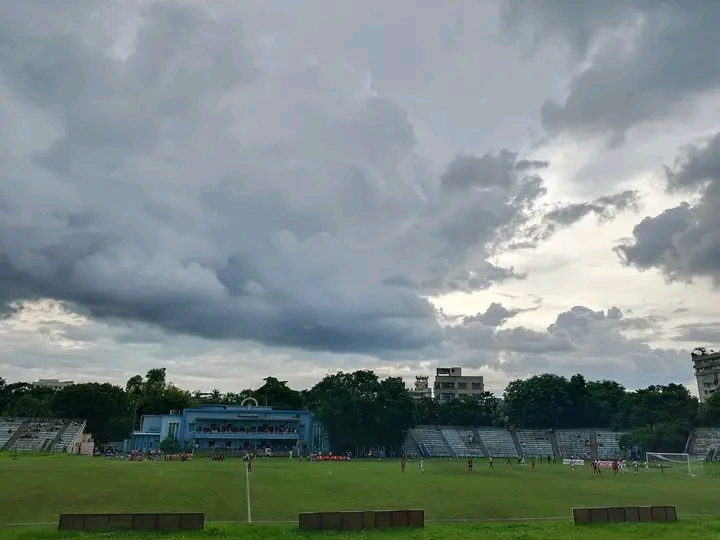
- Rabindra Sarobar Stadium
- Interactive map of Rabindra Sarobar Stadium
- Full name: Rabindra Sarobar Stadium
- Location: Lake Gardens, Kolkata
- Owner: West Bengal Government
- Operator: Mohammedan SC
- Capacity: 22,000
- Surface: Grass

Construction
- Opened: 1961

Tenant
- Calcutta Football League clubs

The Rabindra Sarobar Stadium is a multi-use stadium in Lake Gardens, Kolkata, India. It is used for football matches and serves as the home of many Calcutta Football League matches.

== History ==
The venue opened in 1961. It also was the home ground of Indian Super League club ATK in 2016 while the Salt Lake Stadium was undergoing renovations for the 2017 FIFA U-17 World Cup.

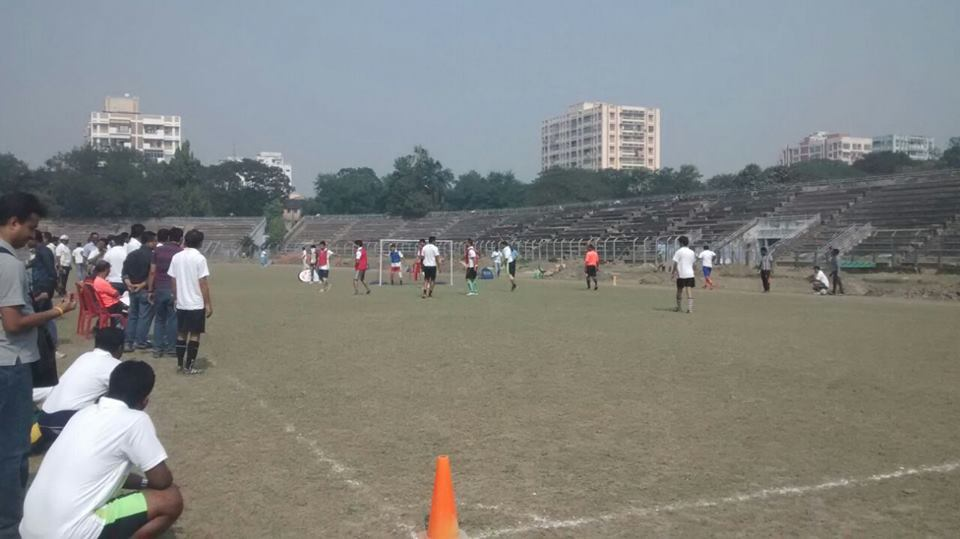
The stadium on a matchday before renovation

For the 2016–17 I-League season, it has hosted a majority of the home matches for Mohun Bagan. Mohun Bagan used the venue as their home stadium for the AFC Cup matches in 2017. It also hosted some important domestic and international level matches. It also hosts Rugby Union matches.
