= ARFU Asian Rugby Series =

International rugby union competition

- Sport: Rugby union
- Instituted: 2003
- Inaugural season: 2003-04
- Ceased: 2007
- Replaced by: Asian Five Nations
- Region: Asia (ARFU)
- Holders: Japan (2007)
- Most titles: Japan (3 titles)
- Qualification: Rugby World Cup

The Asian Rugby Series was an international rugby union competition held between Asian national rugby sides. The tournament started in 2003, initially as an alternative to the ARFU Asian Rugby Championship, but was merged with the ARC in 2008, to create the Asian Five Nations.

== Hall of Fame ==
Year	Winner	Runner-up	Third
2003-04	South Korea	Japan	Taiwan
2005	Japan	South Korea	Hong Kong
2006	Japan	South Korea	Arabian Gulf
2007	Japan	Hong Kong	South Korea
