= 2010 Asian Five Nations division tournaments =

- Date: 14 April 2010 – 26 June 2010
- Countries: (20) Refer to division

Tournament statistics
- Matches played: 20
- Official website: Website

The 2010 Asian Five Nations division tournaments, known as the 2010 HSBC Asian 5 Nations due to the tournament's sponsorship by the HSBC, refer to the Asian Five Nations divisions played within the tournament. This was the 3rd series of the Asian Five Nations.

There were four main divisions, with further regional division. The winners of Division 1 would be promoted up to the Top Division for 2011, as will the winner of Division 2 being promoted to Division 1. The loser of Division 1, drops to Division 2, and the winner of Division 3 replaces the last place team in Division 2.

Scoring system: 5 points for a win, three for a draw, one bonus point for being within seven points of the winning team, and one for four tries.

== Changes from 2009 ==
- The Arabian Gulf are no longer competing in Division 1, following promotion to the Top 5 Division.
- Malaysia have replaced Thailand in Division 1, with Thailand competing in Division 2.
- Philippines will compete in Division 2 - replacing Pakistan, following promotion from Division 3.
- A newly Division 4 is added, with only one Regional Division taking place.

== Teams ==
The teams involved, with their world rankings pre tournament, were:

Division 1

- Chinese Taipei (52)
- Malaysia (68)
- Singapore (51)
- Sri Lanka (54)

Division 2

- China (52)
- India (84)
- Thailand (71)
- Philippines (NA)

Division 3

- Guam (82)
- Indonesia (NA)
- Iran (NA)
- Pakistan (NA)

Division 4

- (Kazakhstan) Almaty Select XV (NA)
- Jordan (NA)
- Mongolia (NA)
- Uzbekistan (NA)

Regional Division

- Brunei (NA)
- Cambodia (NA)
- Laos (NA)

== Division 1 ==
Key to colours
Earns Promotion
Relegated

2010 Asian Five Nations division 1
Tournament details
- Host: Singapore
- Date: 14 – 17 April 2010
- Countries: 4

Final positions
- Champions: Sri Lanka
- Relegated: Chinese Taipei

Tournament statistics
- Matches played: 4

Division One is the second level of the ARFU. As the winner of Division One, Sri Lanka was promoted to 2011 HSBC Asian 5 Nations and the 4th place team, Chinese Taipei, was relegated to Division Two for 2011.

Semi-finals
April 14, 2010
Chinese Taipei	7
Sri Lanka	37
April 14, 2010
Singapore	22
Malaysia	20

Final
April 17, 2010
Sri Lanka	23
Singapore	16
3rd-Place final
April 17, 2010
Chinese Taipei	8
Malaysia	35

=== Fixtures ===
==== Semi finals ====
Home	Score	Away	Match Information
Home	Score	Away	Date	Venue
Chinese Taipei	7–37	Sri Lanka	14-Apr-2010	Yio Chu Kang Stadium, Singapore
Singapore	22–20	Malaysia	14-Apr-2010	Yio Chu Kang Stadium, Singapore

==== Third v Fourth Final ====
Home	Score	Away	Match Information
Home	Score	Away	Date	Venue
Chinese Taipei	8–35	Malaysia	17-Apr-2010	Yio Chu Kang Stadium, Singapore

==== Final ====
Home	Score	Away	Match Information
Home	Score	Away	Date	Venue
Sri Lanka	23–16	Singapore	17-Apr-2010	Yio Chu Kang Stadium, Singapore

== Division 2 ==
Key to colours
Earns Promotion
Relegated

2010 Asian Five Nations division 2
Tournament details
- Host: India
- Date: 2 – 5 June 2010
- Countries: 4

Final positions
- Champions: Philippines
- Relegated: China

Tournament statistics
- Matches played: 4

Division Two is the third level of the ARFU. As the winner of Division Two, the Philippines was promoted to Division One for 2011 and the fourth-placed team, China, was relegated to Division Three for 2011.

Semi-finals
June 2, 2010
China	5
India	94
June 2, 2010
Thailand	33
Philippines	53

Final
June 5, 2010
India	12
Philippines	34
3rd-Place final
June 5, 2010
China	5
Thailand	56

=== Fixtures ===
==== Semi finals ====
Home	Score	Away	Match Information
Home	Score	Away	Date	Venue
China	5–94	India	2-June-2010	Delhi University Stadium, India
Thailand	33–53	Philippines	2-June-2010	Delhi University Rugby Stadium, India

==== Third v Fourth Final ====
Home	Score	Away	Match Information
Home	Score	Away	Date	Venue
China	5–56	Thailand	5-June-2010	Delhi University Rugby Stadium, India

==== Final ====
Home	Score	Away	Match Information
Home	Score	Away	Date	Venue
India	12–34	Philippines	5-June-2010	Delhi University Rugby Stadium, India

== Division 3 ==
Key to colours
Earns Promotion
Relegated

2010 Asian Five Nations division 3
Tournament details
- Host: Indonesia
- Date: 9 – 12 June 2010
- Countries: 4

Final positions
- Champions: Iran

Tournament statistics
- Matches played: 4

Division Three is the fourth level of the ARFU. As the winner of Division Three, Iran was promoted to Division Two for 2011 and the fourth-placed team, Indonesia, was relegated to Division Four for 2011.

Semi-finals
June 9, 2010
Guam	11
Iran	44
June 9, 2010
Pakistan	13
Indonesia	11

Final
June 12, 2010
Iran	19
Pakistan	6
3rd-Place final
June 12, 2010
Guam	49
Indonesia	12

=== Fixtures ===
==== Semi finals ====
Home	Score	Away	Match Information
Home	Score	Away	Date	Venue
Guam	11–44	Iran	9-June-2010	UPH Stadium, Jakarta, Indonesia
Pakistan	13–11	Indonesia	9-June-2010	UPH Stadium, Jakarta, Indonesia

==== Third v Fourth Final ====
Home	Score	Away	Match Information
Home	Score	Away	Date	Venue
Guam	49–12	Indonesia	12-June-2010	UPH Stadium, Jakarta, Indonesia

==== Final ====
Home	Score	Away	Match Information
Home	Score	Away	Date	Venue
Iran	19–6	Pakistan	12-June-2010	UPH Stadium, Jakarta, Indonesia

== Division 4 ==
Key to colours
Earns Promotion
Relegated

2010 Asian Five Nations division 4
Tournament details
- Host: Kazakhstan
- Date: 9 – 12 June 2010
- Countries: 12

Final positions
- Champions: Jordan

Tournament statistics
- Matches played: 15

Division Four is the fifth level and new Tournament of the ARFU. The Division IV tournament was originally scheduled to be held in Bishkek, Kyrgyzstan, but recent unrest forced the movement of the division to neighbouring Kazakhstan and the recent closure of the border between Kyrgyzstan and Kazakhstan saw Kyrgyzstan unable to travel for the tournament. Kyrgyzstan were replaced by an assembled Almaty Select XV. As the winner of Division Four, Jordan was promoted to Division Three for 2011

Semi-finals
June 9, 2010
Uzbekistan	46
(Kazakhstan) Almaty Select XV	0
June 9, 2010
Jordan	29
Mongolia	21

Final
June 12, 2010
Uzbekistan	3
Jordan	28
3rd-Place final
June 12, 2010
(Kazakhstan) Almaty Select XV	38
Mongolia	21

=== Fixtures ===
==== Semi finals ====
Home	Score	Away	Match Information
Home	Score	Away	Date	Venue
Uzbekistan	46–0	(Kazakhstan) Almaty Select XV	9-June-2010	Central Stadium, Almaty, Kazakhstan
Jordan	29–21	Mongolia	9-June-2010	Central Stadium, Almaty, Kazakhstan

==== Third v Fourth Final ====
Home	Score	Away	Match Information
Home	Score	Away	Date	Venue
Almaty Select XV (Kazakhstan)	38–21	Mongolia	12-June-2010	Central Stadium, Almaty, Kazakhstan

==== Final ====
Home	Score	Away	Match Information
Home	Score	Away	Date	Venue
Uzbekistan	3–28	Jordan	12-June-2010	Central Stadium, Almaty, Kazakhstan

=== Regional ===
2010 Asian Five Nations regional division
Tournament details
- Host: Cambodia
- Date: 20 – 26 June 2010
- Countries: 4

Final positions
- Champions: Laos

Tournament statistics
- Matches played: 3

==== Fixtures ====
Home	Score	Away	Match Information
Home	Score	Away	Date	Venue
Cambodia	9–10	Brunei	20-June-2010	National Sports Complex, Phnom Penh, Cambodia
Laos	23–5	Brunei	23-June-2010	National Sports Complex, Phnom Penh, Cambodia
Cambodia	3–12	Laos	26-June-2010	National Sports Complex, Phnom Penh, Cambodia

== Test Match ==
Home	Score	Away	Match Information
Home	Score	Away	Date	Venue
Lebanon	27–8	Jordan	14-May-2010	The Sevens, Dubai, UAE

- First test match for both teams.
- Lebanon were recently admitted to the ARFU as an associate member (12/2009)

== See also ==
- 2010 Asian Five Nations
