= 2009 Asian Five Nations division tournaments =

- Date: 22 March 2009 – 4 July 2009
- Countries: (18) Refer to division

Tournament statistics
- Matches played: 17
- Official website: Website

The 2009 Asian Five Nations division tournaments, known as the 2009 HSBC Asian 5 Nations due to the tournament's sponsorship by the HSBC, refer to the Asian Five Nations divisions played within the tournament. This was the 2nd series of the Asian Five Nations.

There were three main divisions, with two further regional divisions. The winners of Division 1 would be promoted up to the Top Division for 2010, as will the winner of Division 2 being promoted to Division 1. The loser of Division 1, drops to Division 2. With the newly included Division 3, this also means the winner of Division 3 will replace the loser of Division 2 in 2010.

Scoring system: 5 points for a win, three for a draw, one bonus point for being within seven points of the winning team, and one for four tries.

== Changes from 2008 ==
- Singapore are no longer competing in Division 1, following promotion to the Top 5 Division.
- Thailand have replaced China in Division 1, with China competing in Division 2.
- A newly Division 3 is added, with less Regional Divisions taking place.

== Teams ==
The teams involved, with their world rankings pre tournament, were:

Division 1

- Arabian Gulf (44)
- Chinese Taipei (50)
- Sri Lanka (51)
- Thailand (71)

Division 2

- China (45)
- India (81)
- Malaysia (78)
- Pakistan (NA)

Division 3

- Indonesia (NA)
- Iran (NA)
- Guam (81)
- Philippines (NA)

Regional Division 1

- Brunei (NA)
- Cambodia (NA)
- Laos (NA)

Regional Division 2

- Kyrgyzstan (NA)
- Mongolia (NA)
- Uzbekistan (NA)

== Division 1 ==
Key to colours
Earns Promotion
Relegated

2009 Asian Five Nations division 1
Tournament details
- Host: United Arab Emirates
- Date: 8 – 11 April 2009
- Countries: 4
- Champions: Arabian Gulf
- Relegated: Thailand

Tournament statistics
- Matches played: 4

Division One served as the second round of qualifying for the 2011 Rugby World Cup, as the champion, Arabian Gulf, earned promotion to the Asian Five Nations for the 2010 season. The 2010 HSBC Asian Five Nations will be the final qualifying stage for the Asian representative at the 2011 Rugby World Cup.

Semi-finals
8 April 2009
Chinese Taipei	36
Sri Lanka	24
8 April 2009
Arabian Gulf	36
Thailand	17

Final
11 April 2009
Chinese Taipei	24
Arabian Gulf	44
3rd-Place final
11 April 2009
Sri Lanka	51
Thailand	17

=== Fixtures ===
==== Semi finals ====
Home	Score	Away	Match Information
Home	Score	Away	Date	Venue
Chinese Taipei	36–24	Sri Lanka	8 Apr 2009	The Sevens, Dubai, United Arab Emirates
Arabian Gulf	36–17	Thailand	8 Apr 2009	The Sevens, Dubai, United Arab Emirates

==== Third v Fourth Final ====
Home	Score	Away	Match Information
Home	Score	Away	Date	Venue
Sri Lanka	51–17	Thailand	11 Apr 2009	The Sevens, Dubai, United Arab Emirates

==== Final ====
Home	Score	Away	Match Information
Home	Score	Away	Date	Venue
Chinese Taipei	24–44	Arabian Gulf	11 Apr 2009	The Sevens, Dubai, United Arab Emirates

== Division 2 ==
Key to colours
Earns Promotion
Relegated

2009 Asian Five Nations division 2
Tournament details
- Host: Malaysia
- Date: 3 – 6 June 2009
- Countries: 4

Final positions
- Champions: Malaysia
- Relegated: Pakistan

Tournament statistics
- Matches played: 4

Semi-finals
3 June 2009
China	25
Pakistan	19
3 June 2009
Malaysia	43
India	29

Final
6 June 2009
Malaysia	43
China	15
3rd-Place final
6 June 2009
Pakistan	3
India	44

=== Fixtures ===
==== Semi finals ====
Home	Score	Away	Match Information
Home	Score	Away	Date	Venue
China	25–19	Pakistan	3 June 2009	Kuala Lumpur, Malaysia
Malaysia	43–29	India	3 June 2009	Kuala Lumpur, Malaysia

==== Third v Fourth Final ====
Home	Score	Away	Match Information
Home	Score	Away	Date	Venue
Pakistan	3–44	India	6 June 2009	Kuala Lumpur, Malaysia

==== Final ====
Home	Score	Away	Match Information
Home	Score	Away	Date	Venue
Malaysia	43–15	China	6 June 2009	Kuala Lumpur, Malaysia

== Division 3 ==
Key to colours
Earns Promotion
Relegated

2009 Asian Five Nations division 3
Tournament details
- Host: Philippines
- Date: 1 – 4 July 2009
- Countries: 4

Final positions
- Champions: Philippines

Tournament statistics
- Matches played: 4

Semi-finals
1 July 2009
Guam	23
Indonesia	3
1 July 2009
Philippines	15
Iran	0

Final
4 July 2009
Guam	0
Philippines	25
3rd-Place final
4 July 2009
Indonesia	13
Iran	48

=== Fixtures ===
==== Semi finals ====
Home	Score	Away	Match Information
Home	Score	Away	Date	Venue
Guam	23–3	Indonesia	1 July 2009	Manila, Philippines
Philippines	15–0	Iran	1 July 2009	Manila, Philippines

==== Third v Fourth Final ====
Home	Score	Away	Match Information
Home	Score	Away	Date	Venue
Iran	48–13	Indonesia	4 July 2009	Manila, Philippines

==== Final ====
Home	Score	Away	Match Information
Home	Score	Away	Date	Venue
Philippines	25–0	Guam	4 July 2009	Manila, Philippines

== Regional Divisions ==
Key to colours
Earns Promotion
Relegated

=== Regional 1 ===
Position	Nation	Games				Points			Table points
Position	Nation	Played	Won	Drawn	Lost	For	Against	Difference	Table points
1	Laos	2	2	0	0	36	11	25	4
2	Brunei	2	1	0	1	29	38	-9	2
3	Cambodia	2	0	0	2	13	29	-16	0

==== Fixtures ====
Home	Score	Away	Match Information
Home	Score	Away	Date	Venue
Laos	28–8	Brunei	22 Mar 2009	Savannakhet, Vientiane, Laos
Brunei	21–10	Cambodia	25 Mar 2009	Savannakhet, Vientiane, Laos
Cambodia	3–8	Laos	28 Mar 2009	Savannakhet, Vientiane, Laos

==== Regional 2 ====
Semifinal			Final
			1	Uzbekistan	31
2	Kyrgyzstan	38		Kyrgyzstan	12
3	Mongolia	21

===== Semifinal =====
Home	Score	Away	Match Information
Home	Score	Away	Date	Venue
Kyrgyzstan	38–21	Mongolia	9 June 2009	Tashkent, Uzbekistan

===== Final =====
Home	Score	Away	Match Information
Home	Score	Away	Date	Venue
Uzbekistan	31–12	Kyrgyzstan	13 June 2009	Tashkent, Uzbekistan

== See also ==
- 2009 Asian Five Nations
