= 2019 Asia Rugby Championship division tournaments =

2019 ARC division tournaments
- Date: 30 March – 29 June 2019

Tournament statistics

The 2019 Asia Rugby Championship division tournaments refers to the divisions played within the annual international rugby union tournament for the Asian region. The Asia Rugby Championship (ARC) replaced the Asian Five Nations tournament in 2015. The main tournament is now contested by the top three teams in Asia. The other national teams in Asia compete in three divisions.

== Teams ==
The following teams were announced as playing the 2019 tournaments:

Pre-tournament world rankings in parentheses

Division 1

- Chinese Taipei (64)
- Philippines (53)
- Singapore (57)
- Sri Lanka (44)

Division 2

- Guam (69)
- Kazakhstan (62)
- Thailand (76)
- United Arab Emirates (70)
Division 3

West

- ~~Iran (N/A)~~ (withdrawn)
- Jordan (N/A)
- Lebanon (N/A)
- Qatar (N/A)

Central

- Pakistan (93)
- Uzbekistan (90)

South-East

- China (87)
- India (82)
- Indonesia (102)

== Division 1 ==
2019 Asia Rugby Division 1
Tournament details
- Host: Chinese Taipei
- Venue: Taipei Municipal Stadium
- Date: 29 May - 1 June
- Countries: 4

Final positions
- Champions: Philippines
- Relegated: Chinese Taipei

Tournament statistics
- Matches played: 4

The Division 1 Tournament was held from 29 May to 1 June at Taipei Municipal Stadium in Taipei, Taiwan.

Semi-finals
29 May 2019 - 17:00
Philippines	39
Sri Lanka	22
29 May 2019 - 19:00
Chinese Taipei	13
Singapore	18

Final
2 June 2019 - 19:00
Philippines	29
Singapore	21
Third place play-off
2 June 2019 - 17:00
Sri Lanka	72
Chinese Taipei	17

Semi-Finals

29 May 2019	Philippines	39–22	Sri Lanka	Taipei Municipal Stadium, Taipei
17:00		Report		Referee: Stephen Copeman (Hong Kong)

29 May 2019	Chinese Taipei	13–18	Singapore	Taipei Municipal Stadium, Taipei
19:00		Report		Referee: Seo In-soo (South Korea)

Finals

1 June 2019	Sri Lanka	72–17	Chinese Taipei	Taipei Municipal Stadium, Taipei
17:00		Report		Referee: Toshimasa Sekiya (Japan)

1 June 2019	Philippines	29–21	Singapore	Taipei Municipal Stadium, Taipei
19:00				Referee: Craig Chan (Hong Kong)

== Division 2 ==
2019 Asia Rugby Division 2
Tournament details
- Host: Thailand
- Venue: Bang Bon Sport Center
- Date: 15-18 May
- Countries: 4

Final positions
- Champions: United Arab Emirates

The Division 2 Tournament was held from 15–18 May at Bang Bon Sport Center in Bangkok, Thailand.

Semi-finals
15 May 2019
United Arab Emirates	82
Guam	7
15 May 2019
Thailand	38
Kazakhstan	20

Final
18 May 2019
United Arab Emirates	50
Thailand	12
Third place play-off
18 May 2019
Guam	8
Kazakhstan	17

Semi-Finals

15 May 2019	United Arab Emirates	82–7	Guam	Bang Bon Sport Center, Bangkok

15 May 2019	Thailand	38–20	Kazakhstan	Bang Bon Sport Center, Bangkok

Finals

18 May 2019	Guam	8–17	Kazakhstan	Bang Bon Sport Center, Bangkok

18 May 2019	United Arab Emirates	50–12	Thailand	Bang Bon Sport Center, Bangkok

== Division 3 West ==
2019 Asia Rugby Division 3 West
Tournament details
- Host: Qatar
- Venue: Aspire Zone
- Date: 30 March - 5 April 2019
- Countries: 4

Final positions
- Champions: Qatar

The Division 3 West tournament was held from 2–5 April in Doha, Qatar.

Pos	Nation	Games				Points			Bonus points	Total points
Pos	Nation	Played	Won	Drawn	Lost	For	Against	Difference	Bonus points	Total points
1	Qatar	2	2	0	0	90	10	+80	1	9
2	Lebanon	2	1	0	1	81	19	+62	2	6
3	Jordan	2	0	0	2	6	148	-142	0	0
Four points for a win, two for a draw, one bonus point for four tries or more (BP1) and one bonus point for losing by seven or less (BP2).

Matches

30 March 2019	Qatar	77–0	Jordan	Aspire Zone, Doha
18:00	Try: #10 Brook Tremayne 10' #14 Bader Bakaddouri 12', 39', 54', 65' #5 Ismaail El Hatmi 20', 72' #23 Jermaine Allen 24', 48' #3 Martin Murray 32' #11 Ryley Douglas 43' #6 Patrick Mills 60' #7 Tom Featherstone 80+7'; Con: #10 Brook Tremayne 10', 13', 33', 43', 61' #13 Andor Benyi 73'	WR Report; AR Report	Cards: #5 Abed Alhakim Almanasrah (yellow card) 78'

2 April 2019	Jordan	6–71	Lebanon	Aspire Zone, Doha
18:00	Pen: #23 Ibrahim Izminga 22' #15 Firas Khalifeh 37'	WR Report; AR Report	Try: #2 Robbie Farajalla 3', 40+7' #8 Joseph Touma 20' #11 Steve Pere 24', 28', 50' #6 Firas El Chami 32' #22 Hazem El Tawil 64' #13 Laurent Zalloum 72' #15 Ben Abood 78' #5 Mournir Finan 80'; Con: #10 Karim Jammal 11', 20', 33', 40+8', 51', 66', 72', 78', 80+1'

5 April 2019	Qatar	13–10	Lebanon	Aspire Zone, Doha
19:00		WR Report

== Division 3 Central ==
2019 Asia Rugby Division 3 Central
Tournament details
- Host: Pakistan
- Venue: Gaddafi Stadium
- Date: 7-10 April
- Countries: 2

Final positions
- Champions: Pakistan

The Division 3 Central tournament was held from 7–10 April in Lahore, Pakistan.

Pos	Nation	Games				Points			Bonus points	Total points
Pos	Nation	Played	Won	Drawn	Lost	For	Against	Difference	Bonus points	Total points
1	Pakistan	2	1	0	1	68	51	+17	2	6
2	Uzbekistan	2	1	0	1	51	68	-17	1	5
Four points for a win, two for a draw, one bonus point for four tries or more (BP1) and one bonus point for losing by seven or less (BP2).

Matches

7 April 2019	Pakistan	44–13	Uzbekistan	Gaddafi Stadium, Lahore

10 April 2019	Pakistan	24–38	Uzbekistan	Gaddafi Stadium, Lahore

== Division 3 East-South ==
2019 Asia Rugby Division 3 East-South
Tournament details
- Host: Indonesia
- Venue: GBK Rugby Field
- Date: 23 June - 29 June
- Countries: 3

Final positions
- Champions: China

Tournament statistics
- Matches played: 3

The Division 3 East-South tournament was held from 23–29 June in Jakarta, Indonesia.

Pos	Nation	Games				Points			Bonus points	Total points
Pos	Nation	Played	Won	Drawn	Lost	For	Against	Difference	Bonus points	Total points
1	China	2	2	0	0	137	27	+110	2	10
2	India	2	1	0	1	59	86	-27	1	5
3	Indonesia	2	0	0	2	22	105	-83	0	0
Four points for a win, two for a draw, one bonus point for four tries or more (BP1) and one bonus point for losing by seven or less (BP2).

Matches

23 June 2019	Indonesia	10–63	China	GBK Rugby Field, Jakarta
16:00		Report

26 June 2019	India	17–74	China	GBK Rugby Field, Jakarta
16:00		Report		Referee: Rory Crombie (Hong Kong)

29 June 2019	India	42–12	Indonesia	GBK Rugby Field, Jakarta
16:00		Report
