= Bahrain national rugby union team =

Bahrain
- Union: Bahrain Rugby Federation
- Head coach: Rory Drummond
- Captain: Adam Wallace
- Home stadium: Al Janabiyah, Saar, Bahrain

First international
- Bahrain 66–13 Jordan (Manama, Bahrain; 23 May 2025)

Biggest win
- Bahrain 66–13 Jordan (Manama, Bahrain; 23 May 2025)

Biggest defeat
- To be determined

The Bahrain national rugby union team represents Bahrain in rugby union and is governed by the Bahrain Rugby Federation.

== History ==
Bahrain made their test debut on 24 May 2025 when they played Jordan.

They won the match convincingly by 66 pts to 13. They won the Spirit of Bahrain Cup.

== Record ==
Below is a table of the representative rugby matches played by a Bahrain national XV at test level up until 23 May 2025, updated after the match with Jordan.

Opponent	Played	Won	Lost	Drawn	% Won
Jordan	1	1	0	0	100%
Total	1	1	1	0	100%

== Squad ==
Bahrain players selected for their first international match against Jordan.

Head Coach: (Scotland) Rory Drummond

Note: Flags indicate national union for the club/province as defined by World Rugby.

Player	Position	Date of birth (age)	Caps	Club/province
Matt McKee	Prop		0	Bahrain RFC
Cam Thomson	Prop		0	Bahrain RFC
Martin Prinsloo	Hooker		0	Bahrain RFC
Gerard Cronje	Hooker		0	Bahrain RFC
Nick Young	Prop		0	Bahrain RFC
Aidan Ascott	Prop		0	Bahrain RFC
Tian Jacobs	Lock		0	Bahrain RFC
Talal Al Sharif	Lock		0	Bahrain RFC
Tommy Booth	Lock		0	Bahrain RFC
Aled Morris	Flanker		0	Bahrain RFC
Alasdair Crombie	Flanker		0	Bahrain RFC
Cooper Comrie	Flanker		0	Bahrain RFC
Elliot Behan	Number 8		0	Bahrain RFC
Deina Morete	Scrum-half		0	Bahrain RFC
Saul Piper	Scrum-half		0	Bahrain RFC
Joel Lewis	Fly-half		0	Bahrain RFC
Greg Heath	Wing		0	Bahrain RFC
Adam Wallace (c)	Centre		0	Bahrain RFC
Dai Evans	Centre		0	Bahrain RFC
Dan Dryden	Centre		0	Bahrain RFC
Cole Crawford	Wing		0	Bahrain RFC
Sebastian Hofman	Wing		0	Bahrain RFC
Matt Richards	Fullback		0	Bahrain RFC

== See also ==
- Rugby union in Bahrain
- Bahrain national rugby sevens team
