= Rugby union in Mongolia =

Rugby union in Mongolia is a minor but growing sport. Mongolia is represented in international matches by the Mongolia national rugby union team, which compete in the annual Asian Five Nations tournament.

== Governing body ==
The governing body is the Mongolian Rugby Football Union (MRFU), which was established in 2003.

== History ==
Rugby was first introduced into Mongolia from the Soviet Union's Red Army, where it was a moderately popular sport.

The first ever official match of Mongolia was played at 9 June 2009, for the Asian Five Nations, Division II, in Tashkent, Uzbekistan, with Kyrgyzstan, finishing with a respectable 21–38 loss. Mongolia takes part in the regional sections of the Asian Five Nations

There are currently 8 clubs in existence.

== National Championship XV ==
The National Championship XV started in 2013, with Hunter Lions the first winners of the tournament. In 2026 4 teams participated, Khan Uul RFC, Warriors RFC, Hunter Lions and newly promoted Khartsaga RC.

List of Champions
Year	Champions
2013	Hunter Lions (1)
2014	Khan Uul RFC (1)
2015	Hunter Lions (2)
2016	Pioneer Wolves (1)
2017	Pioneer Wolves (2)
2018	Pioneer Wolves (3)
2019	Khan Uul RFC (2)
2020	Khan Uul RFC (3)
2021	Cancelled due to the COVID-19 Pandemic
2022	Khan Uul RFC (4)
2023	Hunter Lions (3)
2024	Khan Uul RFC (5)
2025	Khan Uul RFC (6)
2026	Khartsaga RC

== See also ==
- Mongolia national rugby union team
