= Best Denki Stadium =

Multipurpose stadium in Fukuoka City, Japan

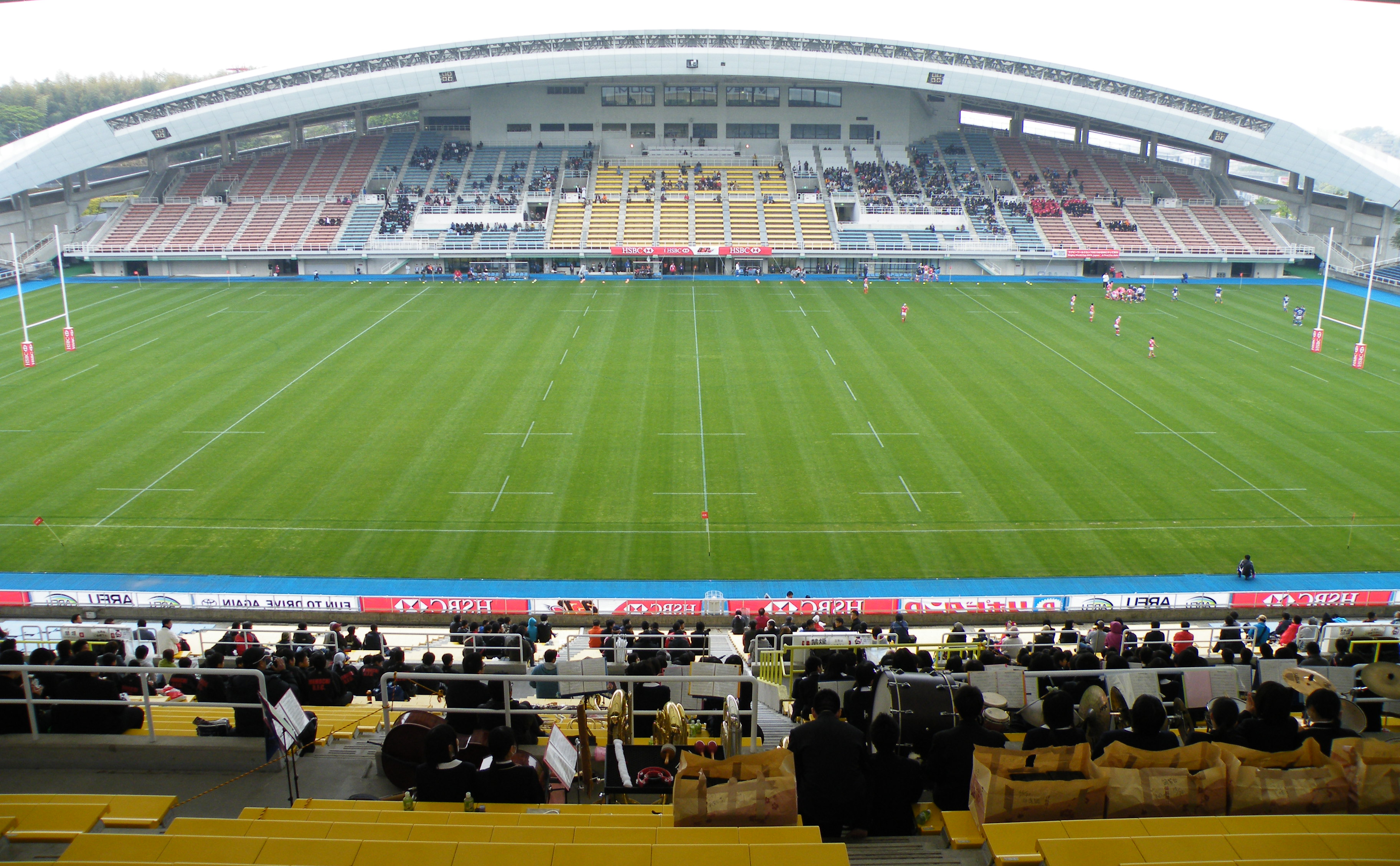
- Interactive map of Best Denki Stadium
- Full name: Best Denki Stadium
- Former names: Hakatanomori Football Stadium (1995–2008); Level-5 Stadium (2009–2019)
- Location: 1-1 Higashihirao Koen, Hakata-ku, Fukuoka, 816-0052, Japan
- Coordinates: 33.585889°N 130.46079°E
- Owner: Fukuoka city
- Capacity: 21,562
- Field size: 144 × 80 m

Construction
- Built: 1995; 31 years ago
- Opened: July 13, 1995; 31 years ago
- Cost: 10 billion JPY

Tenant
- Avispa Fukuoka (1995–present)

Best Denki Stadium (ベスト電器スタジアム) (official name: Higashi-Hirao Park Hakatanomori Football Stadium (東平尾公園博多の森球技場), renamed on March 1, 2008 for naming rights), is located in the Hakata Ward of Fukuoka, Fukuoka Prefecture, Japan.

It is the home ground of the J1 League association football club Avispa Fukuoka.

== History ==
Best Denki Stadium is located in Higashi Hirao Park (commonly known as "Hakata no Mori" (博多の森)), Fukuoka City, Fukuoka Prefecture. This park has been built as a sports park in the hills near the city-town border with Shime Town, Kasuya District, which is adjacent to the east side of the runway at Fukuoka Airport. This is Fukuoka City's first football-specific stadium, which was constructed in 1995 to serve as the main soccer venue for the Universiade Fukuoka Tournament held in Fukuoka.

The stadium also hosts rugby union matches, including a few international matches, Top League games, Top League Challenge series and Top Kyushu league games. It was also host to four games (two match days) in the IRB Junior World Championship 2009, including the 7th place play-off and 5th place play-off on July 21, 2009.

The stadium was one of the venues for 2019 Rugby World Cup which was the first Rugby World Cup to be held in Asia. During the games, to which the clean stadium regulations were applied, the stadium used the name of "Hakatanomori Stadium".

The stadium's seating capacity is 21,562; and it can be accessed by the 15–20 minutes walk or a short bus ride from Fukuoka Airport.

=== Naming rights ===
This stadium was well-known as "Level-5 Stadium" in 2008–2019 seasons, which was named after the game software company. After that, Level-5 announced that it would not renew the naming-right contract in 2020 season, so the new sponsors were recruited. As a result, "Best Denki" which is the home electronics mass retailer headquartered in Fukuoka city has acquired the naming rights. Therefore, this stadium has been using the name of "Best Denki Stadium" (abbreviation: Bes-Sta (ベススタ)) since March 1, 2020.

== International matches ==
=== Association football ===
- Japan 3–2 Mexico (Kirin Cup, 29 May 1996)
- Japan 2–0 South Korea (Final, Football at the 1995 Summer Universiade, 2 September 1995)
- Myanmar–Lebanon, (Friendly match), 19 November 2024

=== Rugby ===
- Japan 21 Australia A 42 (IRB Pacific Nations Cup, June 8, 2008)
- Japan 121 Philippines 0 (2013 Asian Five Nations, April 20, 2013)
- Italy 48 Canada 7 (2019 Rugby World Cup, September 26, 2019)
- France 33 United States 9 (2019 Rugby World Cup, October 2, 2019)
- Ireland 47 Samoa 5 (2019 Rugby World Cup, October 12, 2019)

== See also ==
- Chichibunomiya Rugby Stadium
- Global Arena
- Kintetsu Hanazono Rugby Stadium
- Olympic Stadium (Tokyo)
- Honjo Stadium
- Japan national rugby union team
- Top League
- 2019 Rugby World Cup
