= Rugby union in the Philippines =

Rugby union in the Philippines is a minor but growing sport.

== Governing body ==
The Philippine Rugby Football Union governs operations, tournaments, and development efforts of the sport in the Philippines and was founded in 1999.

== History ==
Like many other Asian countries, early rugby in the Philippines was dominated by expatriates, who tended not to spread the game to the local population. Expatriates were of British, Australian, New Zealand, and to a lesser extent American of origin.

The game has since spread to the local population, the roots of which are in international schools, maritime institutions, and charitable foundations. Club development is particularly young.

The Philippines takes part in the Pacific Asia region of the Asian Five Nations. The Philippines managed to qualify for the main Asian Five Nations tournament in 2013 after finishing first in Division I in the 2012 Asian Five Nations division tournaments. They only won one game out of five, defeating the United Arab Emirates avoiding relegation back to Division I of the division tournament. They also took part in the 2013 Rugby World Cup Sevens in Russia, wherein they were defeated by Japan in the Bowl quarterfinals.

== Development Efforts ==
The PRFU has many rugby development programs. Many of which, target the grassroots development of the sport for the sustainability of talent.

Rugby 101 is an open for all clinic that is run by PRFU Development officers where beginners are exposed to rugby in a progressive manner.

A salient feature of the union is the joint development and corporate social responsibility is the Foundation Club Program. The union is linked to various partner charitable institutions with direct human constituency.

== See also ==
- Philippines national rugby union team
