= 2017 Asia Rugby Championship division tournaments =

Tournament statistics

The 2017 Asia Rugby Championship division tournaments refers to the divisions played within the annual international rugby union tournament for the Asian region. The Asia Rugby Championship (ARC) replaced the Asian Five Nations tournament in 2015. The main tournament is now contested by the top three teams in Asia. The other national teams in Asia compete in three divisions.

== Teams ==
The teams involved in the division tournaments, with their world rankings prior to the competition in brackets:

Division 1

- Sri Lanka (41)
- Malaysia (54)
- Philippines (57)
- United Arab Emirates (72)

Division 2

- Singapore (59)
- Chinese Taipei (67)
- India (76)
- Thailand (80)
Division 3

West

- Uzbekistan (94)
- Iran (NA)
- Lebanon (NA)

East

- Guam (73)
- Indonesia (99)
- Pakistan (81)
- Laos (NA)

== Division 1 ==
2017 Asia Rugby Championship Division 1
Tournament details
- Host: Malaysia
- Date: May 14–20, 2017
- Countries: 4

Final positions
- Champions: Malaysia

Tournament statistics
- Matches played: 6
- Tries scored: 35 (5.83 per match)
- Top scorer(s): (Sri Lanka) Thilina Wijesinghe (36)
- Most tries: (Malaysia) Jobe Mawara Nasalo (Philippines) Justin Coveney (4 each)

The Division 1 tournament will be held in Ipoh, Malaysia. All times are Malaysia Time (UTC+8)

For the 2017 edition of the tournament, Division 1 doubles as part of qualification for the 2019 Rugby World Cup. All teams that do not win Division 1 will be eliminated from World Cup qualification.

=== Table ===
Key to colours
Champions and qualified for 2018 Asia Rugby Championship

Pos	Nation	Games				Points			Bonus points	Total points
Pos	Nation	Played	Won	Drawn	Lost	For	Against	Difference	Bonus points	Total points
1	Malaysia	3	3	0	0	98	39	+59	2	14
2	Sri Lanka	3	2	0	1	66	52	+14	1	9
3	Philippines	3	1	0	2	55	90	-35	1	5
4	United Arab Emirates	3	0	0	3	65	103	-38	0	0
Source: rugbyarchive.net Four points for a win, two for a draw, one bonus point for four tries or more (BP1) and one bonus point for losing by seven or less (BP2).

=== Fixtures ===
==== Round 1 ====
14 May 2017	Sri Lanka	24–13	Philippines
	Try: Danuska Ranjan 16'; Richard Dharmapala 25'; Con: Thilina Wijesinghe 26'; Pen: Thilina Wijesinghe 4', 40', 62', 78'; Cards: Mohamed Taariq (yellow card) 30' to 40'		Try: Ricky Kucia 69'; Justin Coveney 75'; Pen: Kevin Gordon 60'	Referee: (Hong Kong) Lawrence Wilkinson

14 May 2017	Malaysia	36–22	United Arab Emirates
	Try: Jone Mawara Nasalo 14', 35', 46'; Wong Wye Wye 59'; Sakiusa Terence Gavidi 74'; Con: Mohd Fairuz 16', 36', 47'; Samuela Tamanisau 75'; Pen: Mohd Fairuz 47'; Cards: Mohd Syahir Asraf (yellow card) 48' to 58'		Try: Ryno Fourie 22'; Daniel Perry 49'; Kristopher Greene 65'; Con: Andrew Stevenson 24', 66'; Pen: Andrew Stevenson 42'	Referee: (Singapore) Just Wang

==== Round 2 ====
17 May 2017	Sri Lanka	33–17	United Arab Emirates
	Try: Fazil Marija 1'; Danuska Ranjan 19'; Lee Keegal 42'; Jason Dissanayake 68'; Con: Thilina Wijesinghe 20', 43'; Pen: Thilina Wijesinghe 6', 31', 39'; Cards: Sharo Fernando (yellow card) 11' to 21'; Prasad Madusanka (yellow card) 35' to 45'		Try: Glen Moore 17'; Andrew Powell 40'; Con: Andrew Stevenson 18', 40'; Pen: Andrew Stevenson 4'; Cards: Joshua Ives (yellow card) 22' to 32'; Kristopher Greene (yellow card) 26' to 36'	Referee: (Singapore) Charlie Brown

17 May 2017	Malaysia	40–8	Philippines
	Try: Sakiusa Terence Gavidi 17'; Syarif Nurhidayat 25'; Amirul Sani 28'; Wong Wye Wye 36'; Mohamad Aiman Jamaluddin 60'; Dinesvaran Krisnan 80'; Con: Wan Mohammad Asyraf 19'; Muhamad Amirul Aqil 80'; Pen: Wan Mohammad Asyraf 35', 44'		Try: Justin Coveney 50'; Pen: Timothy Bweheni 24'	Referee: (Japan) Taku Otsuki

==== Round 3 ====
20 May 2017	Philippines	34–26	United Arab Emirates
	Try: Justin Coveney 1', 53'; Kevin Gordon 18'; Patrice Olivier 42', 71'; Pen: Kevin Gordon 50', 69'; Drop: Gareth Holgate 80'		Try: Edward Talbot 11'; Ryno Fourie 57'; Con: Andrew Stevenson 12', 58'; Pen: Andrew Stevenson 24', 43', 63', 66'	Referee: (Hong Kong) Lawrence Wilkinson

20 May 2017	Malaysia	22–9	Sri Lanka
	Try: Jone Mawara Nasalo 3'; Sakiusa Terence Gavidi 63'; Wong Wye Wye 66'; Con: Wan Mohammad Asyraf 64'; Muhamad Amirul Aqil 68'; Pen: Muhamad Amirul Aqil 74'; Cards: Jone Mawara Nasalo (yellow card) 5' to 15'; Samuela Tamanisau (yellow card) 11' to 21'; Amirul Sani (yellow card) 58' to 68'		Pen: Thilina Wijesinghe 10', 14', 56'	Referee: (Japan) Taku Otsuki

== Division 2 ==
2017 Asia Rugby Championship Division 2
Tournament details
- Host: Chinese Taipei
- Date: 15–18 November 2017
- Countries: 4

Final positions
- Champions: Singapore

Tournament statistics
- Matches played: 4
- Tries scored: 30 (7.5 per match)
- Top scorer(s): (Thailand) Warongkorn Khamkoet (22)

The Division 2 tournament were held at Taipei Municipal Stadium in Taipei, Taiwan. As the champion, Singapore were promoted to 2018 Asia Rugby Championship Division 1.

Semi-finals
15 November 2017
Singapore	49
India	0
15 November 2017
Chinese Taipei	21
Thailand	27

Final
18 November 2017
Singapore	38
Thailand	13
Third place play-off
18 November 2017
India	19
Chinese Taipei	37

=== Fixtures ===
==== Semi-finals ====
15 November 2017	Singapore	49–0	India
	Try: Charlie Lambert 5', 29', 37'; Teng Chong Yao 34'; Gaspar Tan 47'; Ng Jun Long 55'; Maverick Lim 65'; Nashrul Hadi Hanafi 72'; Robert Riha 79'; Con: Syed Faddil 37'; Patrick Duffy 56'

15 November 2017	Chinese Taipei	21–27	Thailand

==== 3rd-place final ====
18 November 2017	India	19–37	Chinese Taipei

==== Final ====
18 November 2017	Singapore	38–13	Thailand

== Division 3 West ==
2017 Asia Rugby Championship Division 3 West
Tournament details
- Host: Uzbekistan
- Date: 25–31 March 2017
- Countries: 3

Final positions
- Champions: Lebanon

Tournament statistics
- Matches played: 3
- Tries scored: 14 (4.67 per match)
- Top scorer(s): (Lebanon) Karim Jammal (27)

The Division 3 West tournament will be held in Tashkent, Uzbekistan.

Pos	Nation	Games				Points			Bonus points	Total points
Pos	Nation	Played	Won	Drawn	Lost	For	Against	Difference	Bonus points	Total points
1	Lebanon	2	1	1	0	49	48	+1	0	6
2	Uzbekistan	2	0	2	0	37	37	0	0	4
3	Iran	2	0	1	1	37	38	-1	2	4
Four points for a win, two for a draw, one bonus point for four tries or more (BP1) and one bonus point for losing by seven or less (BP2).

=== Fixtures ===
25 March 2017	Uzbekistan	13-13	Iran	Dustlik Stadium, Tashkent
14:00	Try: Doston Arzikulov 33'; Con: Maxsim Lifontov 34'; Pen: Maxsim Lifontov 5', 23'; Cards: Maxsim Lifontov (yellow card) 11' to 21'	report	Try: Ali Yaghoti 46'; Mehdi Golnari Ardekani 78'; Drop: Jalal Jahanbakhsh 21'

28 March 2017	Lebanon	25-24	Iran	Dustlik Stadium, Tashkent
14:00	Try: Penalty Try 67'; Pen: Karim Jammal 7', 10', 16', 42', 51', 80'; Cards: Karim Jammal (yellow card) 24' to 34'	report	Try: Amin Biabani Zadeh 22'; Imam Rajabi Dashtbayaz 45'; Mohammad Ataei Nazarabad 60'; Jalal Jahanbakhsh 72'; Con: Reza Hassan Pour 23'; Navab Asadzadeh 60'; Cards: Rouzbeh Andohgin Tashi (yellow card) 16' to 26'; Robbie Fajalalla (yellow card) 52' to 62'

31 March 2017	Uzbekistan	24-24	Lebanon	Dustlik Stadium, Tashkent
14:00	Try: Semyon Lavrentyev 41'; Dmitriy Bogachkin 68'; Shohruh Akramov 72'; Con: Maxsim Lifontov 41', 69', 72'; Pen: Maxsim Lifontov 8'	report	Try: Joseph Touma 2'; Firas El Chami 50'; Rony Bachour 62'; Pen: Karim Jammal 10', 17', 44'

== Division 3 East ==
2017 Asia Rugby Championship Division 3CE
Tournament details
- Host: Laos
- Date: 1–4 November 2017
- Countries: 4

The Division 3CE tournament was scheduled to be held on 1–4 November 2017 at Chao Anouvong Stadium in Vientiane, Laos, with four teams competing:

- Indonesia
- Guam
- Laos
- Pakistan

The tournament was cancelled due to the unavailability of both Guam and Indonesia.
