= 2018 Asia Rugby Championship division tournaments =

2018 ARC division tournaments
- Date: April–May 2018
- Countries: 15

Tournament statistics
- Matches played: 17

The 2018 Asia Rugby Championship division tournaments refers to the divisions played within the annual international rugby union tournament for the Asian region. The Asia Rugby Championship (ARC) replaced the Asian Five Nations tournament in 2015. The main tournament is now contested by the top three teams in Asia. The other national teams in Asia compete in three divisions.

== Teams ==
The teams involved in the division tournaments:

Division 1

- Philippines (56)
- Singapore (58)

Division 2

- Chinese Taipei (63)
- India (84)
- Thailand (77)
Division 3

West

- Iran (NA)
- Jordan (NA)
- Lebanon (NA)
- Qatar (NA)

Central

- Kazakhstan (61)
- Mongolia (NA)
- Pakistan (91)
- Kyrgyzstan (NA)

East

- Brunei (NA)
- China (87)
- Guam (69)

Note: The national teams from United Arab Emirates, Sri Lanka (both Division I) and Laos (Division 3 East) were originally scheduled to play in their respective divisions, but withdrew prior to the draw being finalised.

== Division 1 ==
2018 Asia Rugby Division 1
Tournament details
- Host: Philippines
- Venue: Southern Plains
- Date: 23–26 June 2018
- Countries: 2

Final positions
- Champions: Philippines

Tournament statistics
- Matches played: 2

The Division 1 tournament consists of two matches between the Philippines and Singapore on 23 and 26 June. Both games took place at Southern Plains in Calamba, Laguna.

=== Fixtures ===
23 June 2018	Philippines	32–24	Singapore	Southern Plains Stadium
	Try: Sean Lynch 5'; Joe Dawson 40', 52'; Robin Fogerty 72'; Elden Hernandez 80+2'; Con: Daniel Matthews 40', 73'; Pen: Daniel Matthews 47'	Report	Try: Jonathan Barber 8'; Xavier Ducourneau 58'; Con: Ishraff Marah 59'; Pen: Jonathan Barber 12', 23'; Ishraff Marah 80+6'; Drop: Jonathan Barber 3'	Referee: Rui Shimizu

26 June 2018	Singapore	12–38	Philippines	Southern Plains Stadium
	Try: Matthew Humphreys 1'; Peter McFeely 33'; Con: Ishraff Marah 35'; Cards: Robert Riha (yellow card) 46' to 56'	Report	Try: Stephen Howorth 3'; Justin Coveney 37', 48'; Joe Dawson 55'; Con: Robin Fogerty 4', 49', 56'; Pen: Robin Fogerty 9', 27', 45', 52'; Cards: Ned Stephenson (yellow card) 78' to 80'	Referee: Insoo SEO

== Division 2 ==
2018 Asia Rugby Division 2
Tournament details
- Host: Thailand
- Date: 20–26 May 2018
- Countries: 3

Final positions
- Champions: Chinese Taipei

The Division 2 tournament was held during May 2018 in Pattaya, Thailand.

Pos	Nation	Games				Points			Bonus points	Total points
Pos	Nation	Played	Won	Drawn	Lost	For	Against	Difference	Bonus points	Total points
1	Chinese Taipei	2	2	0	0	72	26	+46	2	10
2	Thailand	2	1	0	1	39	40	-1	1	5
3	India	2	0	0	2	17	62	-45	1	1
Source: RugbyArchive.net Four points for a win, two for a draw, one bonus point for four tries or more (BP1) and one bonus point for losing by seven or less (BP2).

=== Fixtures ===
20 May 2018	Thailand	18–12	India	Nong Prue Stadium
16:00	Try: Tinnapop Klinkam 37'; Wuttikorn Kaewkhiao 79'; Con: Akarin Thitisakulvit 38'; Pen: Akarin Thitisakulvit 56', 73'	Report	Try: Shokender Shokender 65'; Prince Khatri 79'; Con: Deepak Kumar Punia 79'; Cards: Jitendra Kumar (yellow card) 69' to 79'; Suresh Kumar (yellow card) 80' to 80+2'

23 May 2018	India	5–44	Chinese Taipei	Nong Prue Stadium
16:00	Try: Prince Khatri 49'	Report	Try: Yeh Cheng-Yu 8', 18', 38'; Weng Chen-Hao 30'; Chien Tzu-Fan 46'; Lo Hsin-Kuei 59'; Con: Yeh Chun-Hao 9', 31', 39'; Lo Hsin-Kuei 60'; Pen: Yeh Chun-Hao 5'; Lo Hsin-Kuei 80'

26 May 2018	Thailand	21–28	Chinese Taipei	Nong Prue Stadium
16:00	Try: Vatcharakorn Vorachate 28'; Sumet Thammaporn 57'; Con: Akarin Thitisakulvit 29'; Pen: Akarin Thitisakulvit 6', 38', 69'; Cards: Chatree Wannadit (yellow card) 77' to 80'	Report	Try: Sung Che-Yu 18'; Lin Wei-Ming 39', 60', 75'; Con: Yeh Chun-Hao 19', 40', 61', 76'; Cards: Lin Nu-Fu (yellow card) 43' to 53'

== Division 3 West ==
2018 Asia Rugby Division 3 West
Tournament details
- Host: Lebanon
- Date: 24–27 April 2018
- Countries: 4

Final positions
- Champions: Lebanon

Tournament statistics
- Matches played: 4
- Tries scored: 24 (6 per match)
- Top scorer(s): (Qatar) Bader Bakaddouri (25)

The Division 3 West tournament was held during April 2018 in Beirut, Lebanon.

Semi-finals
24 April 2018
Lebanon	62
Jordan	3
24 April 2018
Iran	17
Qatar	8

Final
27 April 2018
Lebanon	29
Iran	17
Third place play-off
27 April 2018
Jordan	11
Qatar	25

== Division 3 East ==
2018 Asia Rugby Division 3 East
Tournament details
- Host: Brunei
- Date: May 2018
- Countries: 3

Final positions
- Champions: Guam

The Division 3 East tournament was held during May 2018 in Brunei.

=== Fixtures ===
8 May 2018	Brunei	12–66	Guam

10 May 2018	China	12–52	Guam

12 May 2018	Brunei	18–39	China

== Division 3 Central ==
2018 Asia Rugby Division 3 Central
Tournament details
- Host: Kazakhstan
- Date: 16–19 May 2018
- Countries: 4

Final positions
- Champions: Kazakhstan

The Division 3 Central tournament was held during May 2018 in Almaty, Kazakhstan.

Semi-finals
16 May 2018
Pakistan	82
Kyrgyzstan	0
16 May 2018
Kazakhstan	55
Mongolia	6

Final
18 May 2018
Kazakhstan	48
Pakistan	0
Third place play-off
18 May 2018
Mongolia	W
Kyrgyzstan	-

- The third place play off was not played as Kyrgyzstan did not show.
