= 2003–04 ARFU Asian Rugby Series =

1st Asian Rugby Series
Tournament details
- Date: 18 April 2003– 30 June 2004
- Teams: 12 countries

Final positions
- Champions: South Korea
- Runner-up: Japan

Tournament statistics
- Matches played: 30

The 2003–04 ARFU Asian Rugby Series was the first edition of a tournament created by Asian Rugby Football Union for national teams. The formula was in two step. The 12 teams were divided in three pool of three, then, according to the results of the first round, in four pool in order to define the ranking.

== Tournament ==
=== First round ===
==== Pool A ====
18 April 2003

| Sri Lanka | 25–48 | Arabian Gulf |

Colombo

20 April 2003

| Arabian Gulf | 5–79 | Japan XV |

Kandy

22 April 2003

| Sri Lanka | 8–36 | Japan XV |

Colombo

11 October 2003

| Sri Lanka | 22–36 | Hong Kong |

Kandy

19 October 2003

| Junior Japan | 90–5 | Hong Kong |

Heidawai Stadium, Fukuoka

9 May 2004

| Hong Kong | 12–5 | Arabian Gulf |

Hong Kong

Ranking: 1. Japan 2. Hong Kong 3. Arabian Gulf 4. Sri Lanka

==== Pool B ====
21 June 2003

| Malaysia | 0–54 | Taiwan |

Kuala Lumpur

21 June 2003

| Singapore | 71–0 | India |

Singapore

24 June 2003

| Malaysia | 20–13 | India |

Singapore

28 June 2003

| Singapore | 31–13 | Malaysia |

Singapore

28 June 2003

| India | 10–61 | Taiwan |

Kolkata

6 December 2003

| Taiwan | 19–6 | Singapore |

Taipei

Ranking: 1. Chinese Taipei 2. Singapore 3. Malaysia 4. India

==== Pool C ====
12 October 2003

| Kazakhstan | 56–17 | Thailand |

Almaty

16 October 2003

| China | 37–10 | Kazakhstan |

Beijing

20 October 2003

| South Korea | 45–19 | Kazakhstan |

Seoul

16 November 2003

| Thailand | 23–34 | China |

Bangkok

18 November 2003

| South Korea | 63–9 | China |

Bangkok

20 November 2003

| Thailand | 8–68 | South Korea |

Bangkok

Ranking: 1. South Korea 2. China 3. Kazakhstan 4. Thailand

=== Final round ===
==== "Gold" (1st-3rd place) ====
9 May 2004

| Taiwan | 9–67 | Junior Japan |

Taipei

16 May 2004

| Japan | 19–19 | South Korea |

Tokyo

22 May 2004

| South Korea | 99–18 | Taiwan |

Seoul

Ranking :

- 1. South Korea
- 2. Japan
- 3. Taiwan (relegated in division 2 of 2005 ARFU Asian Rugby Series)

==== Plate (4th-6th places) ====
22 May 2004

| Singapore | 14–47 | Hong Kong |

Hong Kong

5 June 2004

| Hong Kong | 27–9 | China |

Hong Kong

12 June 2004

| China | 24–24 | Singapore |

Shanghai

Ranking :

- 4. Hong Kong (Promoted in division 1 of 2005 ARFU Asian Rugby Series)
- 5. China
- 6. Singapore (relegated in division 3 of 2005 ARFU Asian Rugby Series)

==== Bowl (7th-9th place) ====
9 April 2004

| Arabian Gulf | 14–13 | Kazakhstan |

Doha

7 May 2004

| Malaysia | 3–48 | Arabian Gulf |

Kuala Lumpur

15 May 2004

| Kazakhstan | 44–19 | Malaysia |

Almaty

Ranking :

- 7. Arabian Gulf (Promoted in division 2 of 2005 ARFU Asian Rugby Series)
- 8. Kazakhstan (in division 3 of 2005 ARFU Asian Rugby Series)
- 9. Malaysia (in division 3 of 2005 ARFU Asian Rugby Series)

==== Shield (10th-12th place) ====
22 June 2004

| Sri Lanka | 54–17 | India |

Mumbai

26 June 2004

| Thailand | 86–12 | India |

Bangkok

30 June 2004

| Sri Lanka | 35–14 | Thailand |

Colombo

- 10. Sri Lanka (in division 3 of 2005 ARFU Asian Rugby Series)
- 11. Thailand (in division 3 of 2005 ARFU Asian Rugby Series)
- 12. Indonesia (in division 3 of 2005 ARFU Asian Rugby Series)
