= Unions Cup =

Annual men's rugby union competition

Unions Cup is an annual men's rugby union competition involving national and representative teams from Asia. The competition was established in 2024 and was initially contested by Singapore, Thailand and Chinese Taipei. The Philippines joined the competition in 2025.

== History ==
=== 2024 ===
The inaugural Unions Cup was held in Singapore from 29 June to 5 July 2024. It was contested by Singapore, Thailand and Chinese Taipei in a round-robin format.

Singapore defeated Thailand 30–8 in the opening match. Thailand then defeated Chinese Taipei 18–12, before Chinese Taipei defeated Singapore 19–16 in the final match of the tournament.

Singapore won the inaugural competition on points difference after all three teams finished with one win and one loss.

=== 2025 ===
The 2025 edition was held in Kaohsiung, Chinese Taipei, on 9 and 12 July. Four teams participated: Singapore, the Philippines, Chinese Taipei and Thailand. The tournament consisted of two semi-finals followed by a third-place match and a final.

The Philippines defeated Singapore 37–20 in the first semi-final, while Thailand defeated Chinese Taipei 20–19 in the second.

In the third-place match, Chinese Taipei defeated Singapore 27–22. The Philippines then defeated Thailand 23–6 in the final to win the tournament at their first appearance.

=== 2026 ===
The 2026 edition was held in Thailand from 12 to 18 July and expanded to eight teams. The participating teams were the Philippines, Singapore, Thailand, Malaysia, Chinese Taipei, Guam, Laos and the Asian Barbarians.

The opening matches saw the Philippines defeat Laos 74–0, Singapore defeat the Asian Barbarians 21–19, Malaysia defeat Thailand 30–27, and Chinese Taipei defeat Guam 45–14.

In the Cup semi-finals, the Philippines defeated Singapore 33–10 and Malaysia defeated Chinese Taipei 42–29. In the placement semi-finals, the Asian Barbarians defeated Laos 71–20 and Thailand defeated Guam 21–20.

In the finals, Guam defeated Laos 85–12 to finish seventh, Thailand defeated the Asian Barbarians 27–20 to finish fifth, and Chinese Taipei defeated Singapore 47–22 to finish third. In the final, the Philippines defeated Malaysia 39–18 to retain the title.

== Results ==
=== 2024 ===
The inaugural tournament was played as a round-robin competition in Singapore.

Date	Phase	Team	Result	Team	Venue
29 June 2024	Round-robin	Singapore	30–8	Thailand	Jurong West Stadium, Singapore
2 July 2024	Round-robin	Thailand	18–12	Chinese Taipei	Jurong West Stadium, Singapore
5 July 2024	Round-robin	Singapore	16–19	Chinese Taipei	Jurong West Stadium, Singapore

Singapore won the tournament on points difference after all three teams finished with one win and one loss.

=== 2025 ===
The tournament was expanded to four teams and played in Kaohsiung, Chinese Taipei. The competition used a knockout format.

Date	Phase	Team	Result	Team	Venue
9 July 2025	Semi-final	Philippines	37–20	Singapore	Kaohsiung National Stadium, Kaohsiung
9 July 2025	Semi-final	Chinese Taipei	19–20	Thailand	Kaohsiung National Stadium, Kaohsiung
12 July 2025	Third-place match	Chinese Taipei	27–22	Singapore	Kaohsiung National Stadium, Kaohsiung
12 July 2025	Final	Philippines	23–6	Thailand	Kaohsiung National Stadium, Kaohsiung

Champions: Philippines

=== 2026 ===
The 2026 tournament was expanded to eight teams and was played in Bangkok, Thailand. The teams were divided into two pools, with the top two teams in each pool advancing to the Cup semi-finals.

Date	Phase	Team	Result	Team	Venue
12 July 2026	Pool stage	Philippines	74–0	Laos	Navaminda Kasatriyadhiraj Royal Air Force Academy, Bangkok
12 July 2026	Pool stage	Singapore	21–19	Asian Barbarians	Navaminda Kasatriyadhiraj Royal Air Force Academy, Bangkok
12 July 2026	Pool stage	Thailand	27–30	Malaysia	Armed Forces Development Command, Bangkok
12 July 2026	Pool stage	Chinese Taipei	45–14	Guam	Armed Forces Development Command, Bangkok
15 July 2026	Placement semi-final	Laos	20–71	Asian Barbarians	Navaminda Kasatriyadhiraj Royal Air Force Academy, Bangkok
15 July 2026	Placement semi-final	Guam	20–21	Thailand	Armed Forces Development Command, Bangkok
15 July 2026	Cup semi-final	Philippines	33–10	Singapore	Navaminda Kasatriyadhiraj Royal Air Force Academy, Bangkok
15 July 2026	Cup semi-final	Chinese Taipei	29–42	Malaysia	Armed Forces Development Command, Bangkok
18 July 2026	7th-place match	Laos	12–85	Guam	Nonthaburi Provincial Administrative Organisation Stadium, Nonthaburi
18 July 2026	5th-place match	Asian Barbarians	20–27	Thailand	Nonthaburi Provincial Administrative Organisation Stadium, Nonthaburi
18 July 2026	Third-place match	Singapore	22–47	Chinese Taipei	Nonthaburi Provincial Administrative Organisation Stadium, Nonthaburi
18 July 2026	Final	Philippines	39–18	Malaysia	Nonthaburi Provincial Administrative Organisation Stadium, Nonthaburi

Champions: Philippines

== See also ==
- Asia Rugby
- Rugby union in Asia
- Philippines national rugby union team
- Singapore national rugby union team
- Thailand national rugby union team
- Chinese Taipei national rugby union team
