= 2006 ARFU Asian Rugby Series =

3rd Asian Rugby Series
Tournament details
- Date: 16 April– 1 July 2006
- Teams: 13 countries

Final positions
- Champions: Japan
- Runner-up: South Korea

Tournament statistics
- Matches played: 17

The 2006 ARFU Asian Rugby Series was the third edition of a tournament created by Asian Rugby Football Union for national teams.

First and second division were also valid as second round of Asian qualification for 2007 Rugby World cup

== Tournaments ==
=== First Division ===
Pos.	Team	P	W	D	Lost	For	Ag.	Diff.	Points	Notes
1	Japan	2	2	0	0	132	23	+109	4	Qualified to the final round of RWC Qualification)
2	South Korea	2	1	0	1	34	55	-21	2	Qualified to the final round of RWC Qualification)
3	Arabian Gulf	2	0	0	2	14	102	-88	0	(substituted off) relegated to next year's division 2

16 April 2006

Japan	82–9	Arabian Gulf
	report

Tokyo

23 April 2006

Japan	50–14	South Korea
	report

Tokyo

5 May 2006

Arabian Gulf	5–20	South Korea
	report

Dubai

=== Second division ===
Pos.	Team	P	W	D	Lost	For	Ag.	Diff.	Points	Notes
1	Hong Kong	2	2	0	0	65	21	+44	4	(substituted in) promoted and Qualified to the final round of RWC Qualif.)
2	Sri Lanka	2	1	0	1	44	42	+2	2	
3	China	2	0	0	2	7	53	-46	0	(substituted off) relegated to next year's division 3

29 April 2006

Sri Lanka	30–0	China

Colombo

14 May 2006

Hong Kong	42–14	Sri Lanka

Hong Kong

21 May 2006

China	7–23	Hong Kong

Shenyang

=== Third division ===
Pos.	Team	P	W	D	Lost	For	Ag.	Diff.	Points	Notes
1	Kazakhstan	2	2	0	0	47	20	+27	4	(substituted in) promoted to next year's division 2
2	Singapore	2	1	0	1	34	51	-17	2	
3	Taiwan	2	0	0	2	42	52	-10	0	(substituted off) relegated to next year's division 4

8 June 2006

Singapore	0–29	Kazakhstan

Singapore

11 June 2006

Taiwan	20–18	Kazakhstan

Singapore

14 June 2006

Singapore	34–22	Taiwan

Singapore

=== Fourth Division ===
Pos.	Team	P	W	D	Lost	For	Ag.	Diff.	Points	Notes
1	Malaysia	2	2	0	0	98	46	+52	4	(substituted in) promoted to next year's division 3
2	Thailand	2	1	0	1	76	65	+11	2	
3	India	2	0	0	2	48	111	-63	0	(substituted off) relegated to next year's division 5

5 June 2006

Malaysia	61–20	India

Kuala Lumpur

7 June 2006

Thailand	50–28	India

Bangkok

22 July 2006

Thailand	26–37	Malaysia

Bangkok

=== Fifth Division ===
Pos.	Team	P	W	D	Lost	For	Ag.	Diff.	Points	Notes
1	Pakistan	2	2	0	0	51	25	+26	4	(substituted in) promoted to next year's division 4
2	Philippines	2	1	0	1	21	38	-17	2	
3	Guam	2	0	0	2	36	49	-9	0	

20 May 2006

Guam	14–18	Philippines

Guam

7 June 2006

Guam	22–27	Pakistan

Manila

11 June 2006

Philippines	3–24	Pakistan

Manila

== Regional tournament ==
Pos.	Team	P	W	D	Lost	For	Ag.	Diff.	Points	Notes
1	Cambodia	3	3	0	0	101	17	+84	6	
2	Indonesia	3	2	0	1	73	60	+13	4	
3	Brunei	3	1	0	2	62	90	-28	2	
4	Laos	3	0	0	3	27	96	-69	0	

27 June 2006

Cambodia	30–7	Indonesia

Phnom Penh

27 June 2006

Brunei	32–17	Laos

Phnom Penh

29 June 2006

Indonesia	34–10	Laos

Phnom Penh

29 June 2006

Cambodia	41–10	Brunei

Phnom Penh

1 July 2006

Indonesia	32–20	Brunei

Phnom Penh

1 July 2006

Cambodia	30–0	Laos

Phnom Penh
