= Philippines national rugby union team =

Philippines
- Nickname: Volcanoes
- Emblem: Volcano
- Union: Philippine Rugby Football Union
- Head coach: Stu Woodhouse
- Captain: David Smith
- Most caps: Jake Letts (27)
- Top scorer: Oliver Saunders
- Top try scorer: Matthew Saunders
- Home stadium: Rizal Memorial Stadium; Philippine Sports Stadium
First colors

World Rugby ranking
- Current: 57 (as of June 2, 2025)
- Highest: 40 (April 2024)
- Lowest: 72 (March 2012)

First international
- Guam 14–18 Philippines (Dededo, Guam; 20 May 2006)

Biggest win
- Philippines 101–0 Brunei (Dededo, Guam; 2 July 2008)

Biggest defeat
- Japan 121–0 Philippines (Fukuoka, Japan; 20 April 2013)

World Cup
- Appearances: None
- Website: https://www.philippines.rugby

The Philippines national rugby union team, nicknamed the "Volcanoes", represents the Philippines in international rugby union. The Philippines have been playing in the Asia Rugby Championship since 2006 when the team was first created. In 2012 they won the Division I championship and were promoted to the top five for the 2013 tournament where they earned fourth place and again in the 2014 tournament. The Philippines have yet to make their debut at the Rugby World Cup.

In the March 19, 2012 World Rugby Rankings, Philippines, along with Mexico and Pakistan, were listed for the first time, entering with the base rating of 40 points (which positioned the three national teams in 71st place).

The national side is ranked 57th in the world (as of June 2, 2025).

== History ==
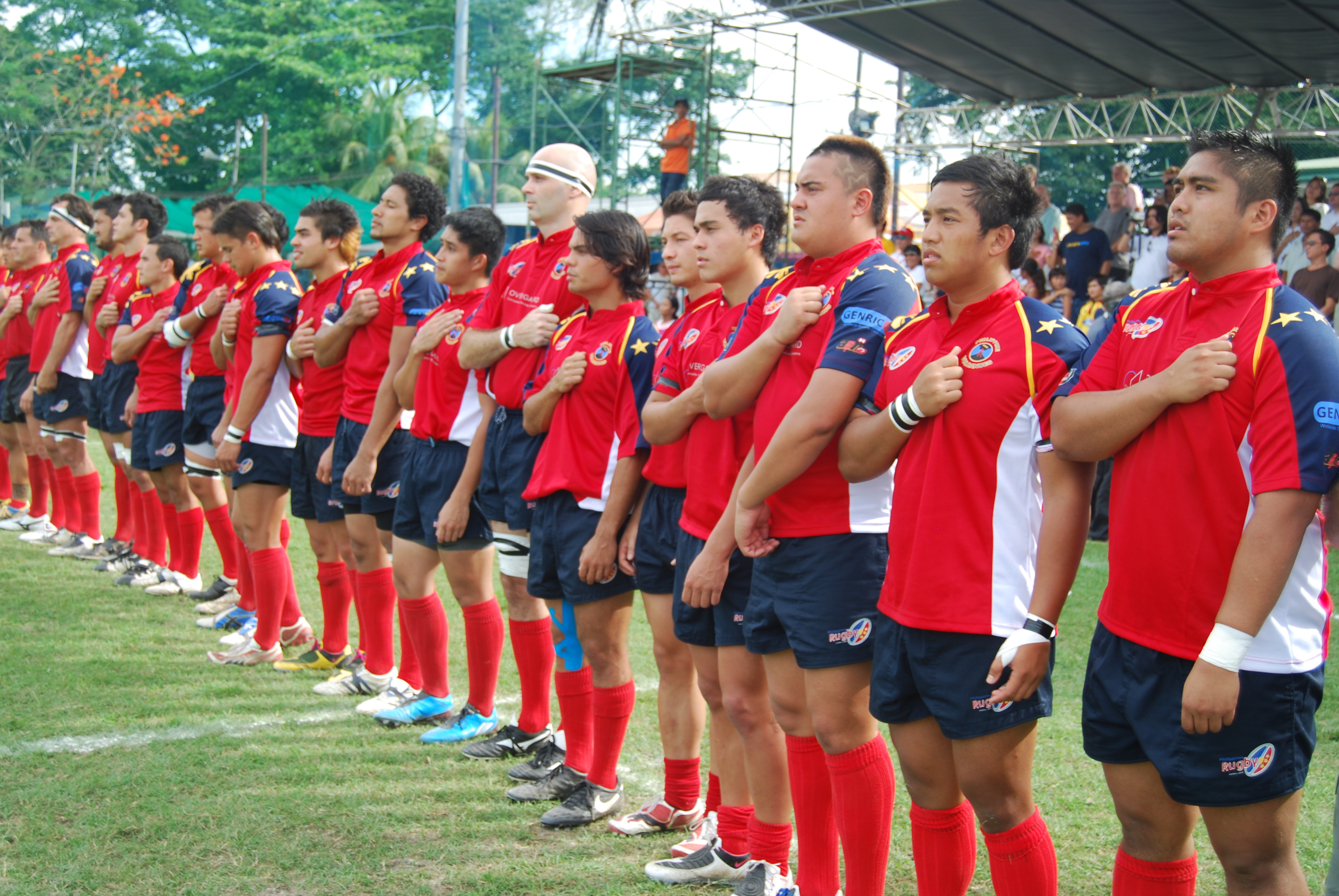
The national team at the 2009 Asian Five Nations Division 3 Final.

In 1998 the Philippine Rugby Football Union (PRFU), the national governing body for rugby union in the Philippines, was formed. Rugby union in the Philippines was introduced mainly through the large number of British, Australian and New Zealand expatriates living in the country.

The Philippines made their first official international debut at the 5th division of the 2006 ARFU Asian Rugby Series. They won over Guam, 18 – 14, in its first match on May 20, 2006, but was later defeated by Pakistan in a match held on June 11, 2006, and failed to secure the sole slot for promotion to the next division. In December 2006, the Philippines Under-19 went undefeated in the Asian Rugby Football Union (ARFU) Under-19 Second Division Tournament.

In 2008, the PRFU gained full membership to the international governing body, the International Rugby Board (IRB). The Philippines dominated the fourth-tier of the ARFU Asian 5 Nations Series and captured the inaugural Division 4 title. During the tournament, the Philippines demolished Brunei 101-0 and then defeated the home side Guam 20–8 to capture the division title.

In 2009 the Philippines won the inaugural Asian 5 Nations Division III rugby tournament at the Nomads field in Parañaque City. Defeating Iran 15-0 and Guam 25–0 in their two matches, the Philippines were then promoted to the Asian Five Nations Division II rugby tournament.

In 2010 the Philippines competed in the Asian 5 Nations Division II tournament and won it beating India in the final on a score of 44–12. Also in 2010 they played in ARFU Rugby 7s tournaments in Shanghai, Borneo and the Asian Games in Guangzhou.

In 2012 the Philippines competed in the Asian 5 Nations Division I tournament and went unbeaten in the round-robin series against Singapore, Chinese Taipei and Sri Lanka, therefore qualifying for the main division for the first time.

The Volcanoes suffered heavy defeats in the 2013 edition of A5N, however showed good signs with a competitive first half against Hong Kong in Manila, and a win to avoid relegations against UAE also in Manila.

After the 2019 Asia Rugby Championship Division I tournament, the Philippines went on a hiatus due to the COVID-19 pandemic. They returned in 2025, when they won the Unions Cup title in Kaohshiung, Taiwan.

== Tournaments ==
Tournament	Year	Division	Place	National Ranking
ARFU Asian Rugby Series	2006	5	2nd	NA
ARFU Asian Rugby Series	2007	5	2nd	NA
Asian Five Nations division tournaments	2008	3 (Pacific—Asia Region)	1st	NA
Asian Five Nations division tournaments	2009	3	1st	NA
Asian Five Nations division tournaments	2010	2	1st	NA
Asian Five Nations division tournaments	2011	1	3rd	NA
Asian Five Nations division tournaments	2012	1	1st	72
Asian Five Nations	2013	Top	4th	56
Asian Five Nations	2014	Top	4th	57
Asian Rugby Championship division tournaments	2015	1	2nd	52
Asia Rugby Championship division tournaments	2016	1	3rd	54
Asia Rugby Championship division tournaments	2017	1	3rd	57
Asia Rugby Championship division tournaments	2018	1	1st	56
Asia Rugby Championship division tournaments	2019	1	1st	53
Asia Rugby Championship division tournaments	2022	1	Canceled	43
Asia Rugby Championship division tournaments	2023	1	Forfeited	41
Asia Rugby Championship division tournaments	2024	1	Not entered	40
Unions Cup	2025	/	1st	57
Unions Cup	2026	/	1st	52

== Record ==
Below is a table of the representative rugby matches played by a Philippines national XV at test level up until 18 July 2026, updated after match with Malaysia.

Opponent	Played	Won	Lost	Drawn	% Won
Brunei	1	1	0	0	100%
Chinese Taipei	1	1	0	0	100%
Guam	4	4	0	0	100%
Hong Kong	4	0	4	0	0%
Hong Kong A	2	0	2	0	0%
India	2	1	1	0	50%
Iran	1	1	0	0	100%
Japan	2	0	2	0	0%
Laos	1	1	0	0	0%
Malaysia	4	3	1	0	75%
Pakistan	1	0	1	0	0%
Singapore	8	7	1	0	87.5%
South Korea	3	0	3	0	0%
Sri Lanka	6	3	3	0	50%
Thailand	2	2	0	0	100%
United Arab Emirates	2	2	0	0	100%
Total	44	26	18	0	59.09%

== Nickname and emblem ==
Insignia of the 1st Philippine Regiment

The Philippines national rugby union team is nicknamed the 'Volcanoes'. The name comes from the 1st Filipino Infantry Regiment that fought under the command of the United States Army. It was made up of Filipino-Americans with a few Filipino veterans which fought in World War II. The PRFU thought the situation was similar to the first Philippines national team which mainly consisted of foreign expatriates with only a few Filipinos.

The emblem of the team is based on the insignia of the 1st Filipino Infantry Regiment. One of its features is a volcano which represents where the infantry units were located.

== Players ==
=== Current squad ===
Squad for 2025 Unions Cup:

- Lawrence Beboso
- John Mark Cardenas
- Thomas Reyes Jr.
- Ken Mellorin
- Fausto Eizmendi
- James Ryan
- Connor Browne
- Kian Mulholland
- Edlen Hernandez
- Craig Wallace
- Dylan Davies
- Christopher Flores
- Jonathan Greenwood
- Hamish Seddon
- Kai Stroem
- Kohei Mitsuhashi
- Jovan Masalunga
- Michael Blatteis
- Judd Greenhalgh
- Vincent Young
- Patrice Olivier
- Tom Gannan

== Coaches ==
- (Australia) Mike McMahon (2006)
- (Australia) Matthew Cullen (2007–2009)
- (Philippines) Expo Mejia (2009–2013)
- (Australia) Jarred Hodges (2013–)
- (Australia) Stuart Woodhouse (2013, caretaker)

== Honours ==
Asia Rugby Championship

- Division 1 Champions: 2012, 2018, 2019
- Division 2 Champions: 2010
- Division 3 Champions: 2009
- Pacific-Asia Regional Champions: 2008

Unions Cup

- Champions: 2025, 2026
