= 2005 ARFU Asian Rugby Series =

2nd Asian Rugby Series
Tournament details
- Date: 30 April– 12 November 2005
- Teams: 13 countries

Final positions
- Champions: Japan
- Runner-up: South Korea

Tournament statistics
- Matches played: 17

The 2005 ARFU Asian Rugby Series was the second edition of a tournament created by Asian Rugby Football Union for national teams. It was also valid as first round of Asian qualification for 2007 Rugby World cup.

== Tournament ==
=== First Division ===
Pos.	Team	P	W	D	Lost	For	Ag.	Diff.	Points	Notes
1	Japan	2	2	0	0	141	34	+107	4	
2	South Korea	2	1	0	1	87	53	+34	2	
3	Hong Kong	2	0	0	2	6	147	-88	0	(substituted off) relegated to next year's division 2

7 May 2005

Japan	91–3	Hong Kong

Tokyo

15 May 2005

South Korea	31–50	Japan

Seoul

22 May 2005

Hong Kong	3–56	South Korea

Hong Kong

=== Second division ===
Valid also for 2007 Rugby World Cup – Asia qualification

Pos.	Team	P	W	D	Lost	For	Ag.	Diff.	Points	Notes
1	Arabian Gulf	2	2	0	0	54	48	+6	4	(substituted in) promoted to next year's division 1
2	China	2	1	0	1	44	43	+1	2	
3	Taiwan	2	0	0	2	45	52	-7	0	(substituted off) relegated to next year's division 3

30 April 2005

China	22–19	Taiwan

Kunming

20 May 2005

Arabian Gulf	30–26	Taiwan

Manama

11 November 2005

Arabian Gulf	24–22	China

Dubai

=== Third division ===
Valid also for 2007 Rugby World Cup – Asia qualification

==== Pool A ====
Pos.	Team	P	W	D	Lost	For	Ag.	Diff.	Points	Notes
1	Sri Lanka	2	2	0	0	82	55	+27	4	(substituted in) promoted to final
2	Singapore	2	1	0	1	64	61	+3	2	
3	Thailand	2	0	0	2	65	95	-30	0	(substituted off) relegated to next year's division 4

4 June 2005

Thailand	38–48	Sri Lanka

Bangkok

11 June 2005

Singapore	47–27	Thailand

Singapore

25 June 2005

Sri Lanka	34–17	Singapore

Colombo

==== Pool B ====
Pos.	Team	P	W	D	Lost	For	Ag.	Diff.	Points	Notes
1	Kazakhstan	3	3	0	0	135	31	+104	6	(substituted in) promoted to final
2	India	3	2	0	1	78	56	+22	4	(substituted off) relegated to next year's division 4
3	Malaysia	3	1	0	2	60	111	-51	2	relegated to next year's division 4
4	Guam	3	0	0	3	29	104	-75	0	relegated to next year's division 5

4 June 2005

India	22–36	Kazakhstan

Mumbai

8 June 2005

Kazakhstan	48–3	Malaysia

Mumbai

11 June 2005

India	48–12	Malaysia

Mumbai

18 June 2005

Guam	8–8	India

Guam

22 June 2005

Kazakhstan	51–6	Guam

Alma Ata

26 June 2005

Malaysia	45–15	Guam

Kuala Lumpur

=== Final ===
Pos.	Team	P	W	D	Lost	For	Ag.	Diff.	Points	Notes
1	Sri Lanka	2	2	0	0	43	37	+6	2	(substituted in) promoted to next year's division 2
2	Kazakhstan	2	0	0	2	37	43	-6	2	

25 October 2005

Kazakhstan	25–19	Sri Lanka

Almaty

12 November 2005

Sri Lanka	24–12	Kazakhstan

Colombo
