= 84th Anniversary Stadium (Bang Bon) =

Sports venue in Bangkok, Thailand

- Interactive map of 84th Anniversary Stadium
- Location: Bang Bon, Bangkok, Thailand
- Coordinates: 13°38′40″N 100°23′50″E
- Owner: Bangkok Metropolitan Administration
- Operator: Bangkok Metropolitan Administration
- Capacity: 5,000
- Surface: Grass

Construction
- Opened: 2012

84th Anniversary Bang Bon Stadium or Chalerm Phrakiat Bang Bon Stadium (Thai: สนามกีฬาเฉลิมพระเกียรติ 84 พรรษา บางบอน) is a multi-purpose stadium in Bang Bon District, Bangkok, Thailand.

== Background ==
The stadium was built to celebrate the 84th birthday of King Bhumibol Adulyadej, hence the name of the venue. It is currently used mostly for football matches. The stadium holds 5,000 people.
