= Mongolia national rugby union team =

National rugby union team of Mongolia

Mongolia
- Emblem: Edelweiss
- Union: Mongolian Rugby Football Union
- Head coach: Rasheed Ravouvou
First colours	Second colours

First international
- Mongolia 21–38 Kyrgyzstan (June 9, 2009)

Biggest win
- Kyrgyzstan 7–69 Mongolia (July 6, 2022)

Biggest defeat
- Kazakhstan 55–6 Mongolia (16 May, 2018)

The Mongolian national rugby union team represents Mongolia in men's international rugby union. Mongolia is a member of World Rugby, and has yet to play in a Rugby World Cup. The Mongolian Rugby Football Union (MRFU), which governs the sport of rugby in the country, was established in 2003.

Mongolia played its first official match in 2009, a 21–38 loss against Kyrgyzstan in the second regional division of the 2009 Asian Five Nations. From 2010, Mongolia competed sporadically within the newly introduced Division 4 of the tournament. With the restructuring of Asian Rugby, Mongolia has competed in Division 3 Central of the Asia Rugby Championship, most recently in 2022.

== History ==
The first ever official match of Mongolia was played on 9 June 2009 in Tashkent, Uzbekistan, against Kyrgyzstan, finishing with a 21–38 loss. This match took place as part of the second regional division of the 2009 Asian Five Nations. This was Mongolia's only match at their debut tournament. They returned in 2010 to compete in the new Division 4 of the Asian 5 Nations. This saw them lose to 29–21 to Jordan in their opening match. They were then awarded a walkover victory against Kyrgyzstan to finish third from the four teams. They returned to the competition in 2014, recording their first win by defeating the host team, Brunei. A further victory against Cambodia made them champions.

In 2018 Mongolia returned to international competition in the restructured Asia Rugby Championship, competing in Division 3 Central. After a 55–6 defeat to Kazakhstan they obtained a walkover victory against Kyrgyzstan to finish third.

In November 2021, the Mongolian Rugby Football Union (MRFU) was elevated to full member status by World Rugby. It had been an associate member since November 2004.

Mongolia again competed in the 2022 Asia Rugby Championship in Division 3 Central. They suffered a narrow 17–10 defeat to Uzbekistan before recording a record win by defeating Kyrgyzstan 69–7 to again finish third.

In 2024, Fijian J.Ravouvou was appointed as head coach.

== Overall Record ==
Below is a table of the representative rugby matches played by a Mongolia national XV at test level up until 6 July 2022, updated after match with Kyrgyzstan.

Opponent	Played	Won	Lost	Drawn	Win %	For	Aga	Diff
Brunei	1	1	0	0	100%	38	13	+25
Cambodia	1	1	0	0	100%	49	5	+44
China	1	0	1	0	0%	19	46	-27
Jordan	1	0	1	0	0%	21	29	-8
Kazakhstan	1	0	1	0	0%	6	55	-49
Kyrgyzstan	2	1	1	0	50%	90	45	+45
Taiwan	1	1	0	0	100%	19	17	+2
Uzbekistan	1	0	1	0	0%	10	17	-7
Total	9	4	5	0	44.44%	252	230	+22

== See also ==
- Rugby union in Mongolia
