= 2007 ARFU Asian Rugby Series =

4th Asian Rugby Series
Tournament details
- Date: 22 April– 18 July 2007
- Teams: 13 countries

Final positions
- Champions: Japan
- Runner-up: South Korea

Tournament statistics
- Matches played: 17

The 2007 ARFU Asian Rugby Series was the fourth edition of a tournament created by Asian Rugby Football Union for national teams. In 2008, it was replaced by the Asian Five Nations.

== Tournaments ==
=== First Division ===
22 April 2007

Japan	82–0	South Korea

Tokyo

29 April 2007

Japan	73–3	Hong Kong

Tokyo

27 May 2007

Hong Kong	27–20	South Korea

Dubai

Ranking :

1. Japan (admitted to 2008 Asian Five Nations)
2. Hong Kong (admitted to 2008 Asian Five Nations)
3. Sri Lanka (admitted to 2008 Asian Five Nations)

=== Second division ===
27 April 2007

Arabian Gulf	52–11	Sri Lanka

Sharjah

8 May 2007

Kazakhstan	71–6	Sri Lanka

Almaty

12 May 2007

Arabian Gulf	6–49	Kazakhstan

Dubai

Ranking :

1. Kazakhstan (admitted to 2008 Asian Five Nations)
2. Arabian Gulf (admitted to 2008 Asian Five Nations)
3. Sri Lanka (admitted to division 1 of 2008 Asian Five Nations)

=== Third division ===
26 May 2007

Malaysia	19–31	Singapore

Kuala Lumpur

9 June 2007

China	52–23	Malaysia

Beijing

16 June 2007

Singapore	20–36	China

Singapore

Ranking :

1. China (admitted to division 1 of 2008 Asian Five Nations)
2. Singapore (admitted to division 1 of 2008 Asian Five Nations)
3. Malaysia (admitted to division 2 of 2008 Asian Five Nations)

=== Fourth Division ===
12 May 2007

Thailand	44–0	Pakistan

Lahore

16 May 2007

Taiwan	72–3	Pakistan

Bangkok

19 May 2007

Thailand	3–22	Taiwan

Bangkok

Ranking :

1. Taiwan (admitted to division 1 of 2008 Asian Five Nations)
2. Thailand (admitted to division 2 of 2008 Asian Five Nations)
3. Pakistan (admitted to division 2 of 2008 Asian Five Nations)

=== Fifth Division ===
23 June 2007

India	47–0	Guam

Munbai

27 June 2007

Philippines	39–3	Guam

Manila

1 July 2007

Philippines	3–11	India

Manila

1. India (admitted to division 2 of 2008 Asian Five Nations)
2. Philippines (admitted to regional tournament of 2008 Asian Five Nations)
3. Guam (admitted to regional tournament of 2008 Asian Five Nations)

=== Division 6 (Borneo Cup) ===
11 July 2007

Indonesia	17–3	Laos

Bandar Seri Begawan

11 July 2007

Cambodia	30–8	Brunei

Bandar Seri Begawan

14 July 2007

Indonesia	11–10	Cambodia

Bandar Seri Begawan

14 July 2007

Brunei	17–16	Laos

Bandar Seri Begawan

18 July 2007

Cambodia	26–16	Laos

Bandar Seri Begawan

18 July 2007

Brunei	15–28	Indonesia

Bandar Seri Begawan

Ranking:

1. Indonesia
2. Brunei
3. Cambodia
4. Laos
