= 2013 Asian Five Nations =

- Date: 20 April – 13 May 2013
- Countries: Hong Kong; Japan; Philippines; South Korea; United Arab Emirates

Final positions
- Champions: Japan (21st title)

Tournament statistics
- Matches played: 10
- Website: www.asian5nations.com

The 2013 Asian Five Nations, known as the 2013 HSBC Asian 5 Nations due to the tournament's sponsorship by the HSBC, was the 26th Asian Five Nations rugby union tournament, and the sixth since it was rebranded from the Asian Rugby Championship in 2008. Japan won the title for the 21st time, conceding just eight points in the entire tournament compared to a total of 316 scored. The UAE finished last and was relegated for the following season.

== Changes from 2012 ==
- Kazakhstan has been replaced with Philippines, who earns promotion from Division 1.

== Teams ==
The teams involved are:

Nation	Home stadium	City	Head coach	Captain
Hong Kong (29)	Hong Kong Football Club Stadium	Hong Kong	(Wales) Leigh Jones	
Japan (15)	Level-5 Stadium; Chichibunomiya Rugby Stadium	Fukuoka; Tokyo	(Australia) Eddie Jones	Toshiaki Hirose
South Korea (26)	Ansan Wa~ Stadium	Ansan	(South Korea) Seo Chun-Oh	
Philippines (56)	Rizal Memorial Stadium	Manila	(Australia) Jarred Hodges	
United Arab Emirates (NR)	The Sevens	Dubai	(Australia) Duncan Hall	

== Final table ==
2013 Asian Five Nations Champion
Relegated to Division One

Rank	Nation	Games				Points			Bonus points	Total points
Rank	Nation	Played	Won	Lost	Drawn	For	Against	Diff	Bonus points	Total points
1	Japan	4	4	0	0	316	8	308	4	24
2	South Korea	4	3	1	0	185	115	70	3	18
3	Hong Kong	4	2	2	0	134	108	26	2	12
4	Philippines	4	1	3	0	63	250	–187	1	6
5	United Arab Emirates	4	0	4	0	28	245	–217	0	0

== Fixtures ==
20 April 2013
14:00 UTC+9

Japan	121–0	Philippines
Try: Ōno (2) 12', 56'; Broadhurst 21'; Holani (2) 28', 32'; Tatekawa (2) 35', 76'; Sau (2) 38', 84'; Makabe 46'; Onozawa 51'; Fukuoka (2) 58', 66'; Mikami 61'; Asahara 67'; Goromaru 70'; Hatakeyama 74'; Aoki 79'; Con: Goromaru (14/18)	Report

Level-5 Stadium, Fukuoka
Attendance: 2,681
Referee: Dewi Rowlands (Hong Kong)

20 April 2013
16:00 UTC+8

Hong Kong	53–7	United Arab Emirates

Hong Kong Football Club Stadium, Hong Kong

26 April 2013
17:00 UTC+4

United Arab Emirates	10–75	South Korea

Al Ain

27 April 2013
16:00 UTC+8

Hong Kong	0–38	Japan
	Report	Try: Kizu 6'; Ono 38'; Imamura 49'; Hirose (2) 69', 72'; Fujita 85'; Con: Goromaru (4/6)

Hong Kong Football Club Stadium, Hong Kong
Attendance: 3,500
Referee: Aaron Littlewood (Singapore)

4 May 2013
14:00 UTC+9

Japan	64–5	South Korea
Try: Ono 1'; Fukuoka (2) 6', 9'; Kikutani (2) 3', 34'; Fujita 36'; Tui 56'; Penalty try 74'; Goromaru 77'; Sau 84'; Con: Goromaru (7/10)	Report	Try: Youn Hyung 82'

Chichibunomiya Rugby Stadium, Tokyo
Attendance: 7,408
Referee: Tobi Lothian (Hong Kong)

4 May 2013
19:00 UTC+8

Philippines	20–59	Hong Kong

Rizal Memorial Stadium, Manila

10 May 2013
20:00 UTC+4

United Arab Emirates	3–93	Japan
Pen: Ham 53'	Report	Try: Kikutani (3) 7', 25', 49'; Imamura (4) 21', 31', 33', 77'; Fujita (2) 36', 41'; Asahara 59'; Aoki 63'; Yasui 67'; Tatekawa 69'; Atsushi Hiwasa 85'; Con: Tamura (2/5); Nakamura (2/4); Tatekawa (5/6)

The Sevens, Dubai
Attendance: 500
Referee: Dewi Rowlands (Hong Kong)

11 May 2013
12:00 UTC+9

South Korea	62–19	Philippines

Ansan Wa~ Stadium, Ansan

18 May 2013
12:00 UTC+9

South Korea	43–22	Hong Kong

Ansan Wa~ Stadium, Ansan

18 May 2013
19:00 UTC+8

Philippines	24–8	United Arab Emirates

Rizal Memorial Stadium, Manila
