= Rugby union in Bahrain =

- Country: Bahrain
- National team: Bahrain
- First played: Mid 20th century

Rugby union is a minor but growing sport in Bahrain.

== Governing body ==
The Bahrain Rugby Football Union was the country's national rugby governing body, under the Arabian Gulf Rugby Football Union (AGRFU). In January 2009, the International Rugby Board (now World Rugby) announced that the AGRFU would be broken up, with new unions established in each member country. The first national union to be formed from the AGRFU is expected to be that of the UAE. Bahrain's rugby governing body is now the Bahrain Rugby Federation.

== History ==
Bahraini rugby is frequently played in high temperatures, and much of the time on sand. Beach rugby and rugby sevens are also popular. Up until the mid-1980s, the only grass rugby pitch in the country was next to the airport, and games were could be interrupted by the comings and goings of the aircraft.

The sport was reintroduced by Commonwealth ex-patriates working in the oil industry, and they continue to dominate the game. For example, the ARGFU website continues to be in English only. A problem is the drinking culture of rugby, which discourages Muslims from taking up the sport.

Bahrain also has a national sevens team.

== See also ==
- Rugby union in the Arab states of the Persian Gulf
