= 2008 Asian Five Nations =

- Date: 26 April 2008 – 24 May 2008
- Countries: Arabian Gulf; Hong Kong; Japan; Kazakhstan; South Korea

Final positions
- Champions: Japan (16th title)

Tournament statistics
- Matches played: 10
- Website: www.asian5nations.com

The 2008 Asian Five Nations, known as the 2008 HSBC Asian 5 Nations due to its sponsorship by HSBC, was the inaugural series of the newly formatted Asian rugby union tournament, the Asian Five Nations. It is the flagship competition devised by the International Rugby Board to develop the sport in the Asian region. Ten matches were played over five weekends from 26 April to 24 May, with Japan winning all four of their games to become the first Asian Five Nations champions on 18 May 2008.

Scoring system: 5 points for a win, three for a draw, one bonus point for being within seven points of the winning team, and one for four tries.

== Teams ==
The teams involved, with their world rankings pre tournament, were:

- Arabian Gulf (43)
- Hong Kong (30)
- Japan (18)
- Kazakhstan (33)
- South Korea (23)

== Final table ==
Position	Nation	Games				Points				Table points	
Position	Nation	Played	Won	Drawn	Lost	For	Against	Difference	Tries	Bonus Points	Points
1	Japan	4	4	0	0	310	58	+252	48	4	24
2	South Korea	4	3	0	1	150	104	+46	14	3	18
3	Hong Kong	4	2	0	2	96	154	−58	11	1	11
4	Kazakhstan	4	1	0	3	100	172	−72	11	2	7
5	Arabian Gulf	4	0	0	4	65	233	−139	6	1	1

- Bottom team, Arabian Gulf, are relegated to Division One for 2009 edition.

=== Fixtures ===
Date	Match	Result	Venue
2008-04-26	Korea – Japan	17–39	Munhak Stadium, Incheon
2008-04-26	Arabian Gulf – Hong Kong	12–20	Al Ain
2008-05-03	Japan – Arabian Gulf	114–6	Kintetsu Hanazono Rugby Stadium, Osaka
2008-05-03	Hong Kong – Kazakhstan	23–17	Hong Kong
2008-05-09	Arabian Gulf – Korea	20–43	Al Arabi Stadium, Doha
2008-05-11	Kazakhstan – Japan	6–82	Almaty
2008-05-18	Japan – Hong Kong	75–29	Tohoku Denryoku Big Swan Stadium, Niigata
2008-05-18	Korea – Kazakhstan	40–21	South Korea
2008-05-24	Kazakhstan – Arabian Gulf	56–27	Taldykorgan
2008-05-24	Hong Kong – Korea	24–50	King's Park, Hong Kong

Report on JRFU website
