= 2007 Rugby World Cup – Asia qualification =

In qualification for the 2007 Rugby World Cup, thirteen Asian Rugby Football Union (ARFU) nations compete for one full place, and one repechage place (Repechage 2, against Oceania 3). No Asian teams qualified for the quarter-finals in 2003, so none qualify automatically in 2007. Only Japan has been to the World Cup, participating in all five RWCs to date, with only one win in 1991 (England) against Zimbabwe, 52–8. Asia 1 will go into Group B with Australia, Wales, Fiji and Canada.

== Format ==
The qualification structure was as follows:

- First round: 13 teams (divided into three divisions) played home-and-away in a round-robin style pool stage. The two highest-ranked teams in division one advance to the second round in the first division. Two teams from division two advance to the second round, and one team from division three advances to the second round via a play-off.
- Second round: 6 teams (divided into two divisions) were divided into three-team pools. Each team played home-and-away round-robin matches. The two highest-placed teams in division one advanced to the final round (three), while the best-placed team in division two would be the sole team advancing to the final round from their pool.
- Third round: 3 teams played a home-and-away round-robin match against one of each team. The pool winner qualified to the 2007 Rugby World Cup. The runner-up advanced to the repechage qualification phase.

== First round ==
=== Division one ===
Pos	Team	Pld	W	D	L	PF	PA	PD	Pts	Qualification
1	Japan	2	2	0	0	141	34	+107	4	Advance to second round, division one
2	South Korea	2	1	0	1	87	53	+34	2	Advance to second round, division one
3	Hong Kong	2	0	0	2	6	147	−141	0	Advance to second round, division two

7 May 2005

Japan	91–3	Hong Kong

Tokyo

15 May 2005

South Korea	31–50	Japan

Seoul

22 May 2005

Hong Kong	3–56	South Korea

Hong Kong

=== Division two ===
Pos	Team	Pld	W	D	L	PF	PA	PD	Pts	Qualification
1	Arabian Gulf	2	2	0	0	54	48	+6	4	Advance to second round, division one
2	China	2	1	0	1	44	43	+1	2	Advance to second round, division two
3	Chinese Taipei	2	0	0	2	45	52	−7	0	

30 April 2005

China	22–19	Chinese Taipei

Kunming

20 May 2005

Arabian Gulf	30–26	Chinese Taipei

Manama

11 November 2005

Arabian Gulf	24–22	China

Dubai

=== Division three ===
==== Pool A ====
Pos	Team	Pld	W	D	L	PF	PA	PD	Pts	Qualification
1	Sri Lanka	2	2	0	0	82	55	+27	4	Advance to play-off
2	Singapore	2	1	0	1	64	61	+3	2	
3	Thailand	2	0	0	2	65	95	−30	0	

4 June 2005

Thailand	38–48	Sri Lanka

Bangkok

11 June 2005

Singapore	47–27	Thailand

Singapore

25 June 2005

Sri Lanka	34–17	Singapore

Colombo

==== Pool B ====
Pos	Team	Pld	W	D	L	PF	PA	PD	Pts	Qualification
1	Kazakhstan	3	3	0	0	135	31	+104	6	Advance to play-off
2	India	3	1	1	1	78	56	+22	3	
3	Malaysia	3	1	0	2	60	111	−51	2	
4	Guam	3	0	1	2	29	104	−75	1	

4 June 2005

India	22–36	Kazakhstan

Mumbai

8 June 2005

Kazakhstan	48–3	Malaysia

Mumbai

11 June 2005

India	48–12	Malaysia

Mumbai

18 June 2005

Guam	8–8	India

Guam

22 June 2005

Kazakhstan	51–6	Guam

Alma Ata

26 June 2005

Malaysia	45–15	Guam

Kuala Lumpur

==== Division three play-off ====
Pos	Team	Pld	W	D	L	PF	PA	PD	Pts	Qualification
1	Sri Lanka	2	1	0	1	43	37	+6	2	Advance to second round, division two
2	Kazakhstan	2	1	0	1	37	43	−6	2	

25 October 2005

Kazakhstan	25–19	Sri Lanka

Almaty

12 November 2005

Sri Lanka	24–12	Kazakhstan

Colombo

== Second round ==
=== Division one ===
Pos	Team	Pld	W	D	L	PF	PA	PD	Pts	Qualification
1	Japan	2	2	0	0	132	23	+109	4	Advance to the third round
2	South Korea	2	1	0	1	34	55	−21	2	Advance to the third round
3	Arabian Gulf	2	0	0	2	14	102	−88	0	

16 April 2006

Japan	82–9	Arabian Gulf
	Report

Tokyo

23 April 2006

Japan	50–14	South Korea
	Report

Tokyo

5 May 2006

Arabian Gulf	5–20	South Korea
	Report

Dubai

=== Division two ===
Pos	Team	Pld	W	D	L	PF	PA	PD	Pts	Qualification
1	Hong Kong	2	2	0	0	65	21	+44	4	Advance to the third round
2	Sri Lanka	2	1	0	1	44	42	+2	2	
3	China	2	0	0	2	7	53	−46	0	

29 April 2006

Sri Lanka	30–0	China

Colombo

14 May 2006

Hong Kong	42–14	Sri Lanka

Hong Kong

21 May 2006

China	7–23	Hong Kong

Shenyang

== Third round ==
Pos	Team	Pld	W	D	L	PF	PA	PD	Pts	Qualification
1	Japan	2	2	0	0	106	3	+103	4	2007 Rugby World Cup
2	South Korea	2	1	0	1	23	59	−36	2	Repechage
3	Hong Kong (H)	2	0	0	2	8	75	−67	0	

(H) Hosts

18 November 2006

Japan	52–3	Hong Kong

Hong Kong

21 November 2006

Hong Kong	5–23	South Korea

Hong Kong

25 November 2006

South Korea	0–54	Japan

Hong Kong
