= Jordan national rugby union team =

Jordan
Team kit

First international
- Lebanon 27–8 Jordan (Dubai, United Arab Emirates; 14 May 2010)

Largest win
- Jordan 43–13 Saudi Arabia (Ajman, United Arab Emirates; 29 April 2016)

Largest defeat
- Qatar 77–0 Jordan (Doha, Qatar; 30 March 2019)

The Jordan national rugby team represents Jordan in international rugby union. They have yet to make their debut at the Rugby World Cup.

Jordan played their first test match against Lebanon on May 14, 2010, in Dubai. Despite losing 27-8 they won the Division 4 title of the 2010 HSBC Asian Five Nations.

== Record ==
Below is a table of the representative rugby matches played by a Jordan national XV at test level up until 23 May 2025, updated after match with Bahrain.

| Opponent | Played | Won | Lost | Drawn | % Won |
|---|---|---|---|---|---|
| Bahrain | 1 | 0 | 1 | 0 | 0% |
| Egypt | 1 | 1 | 0 | 0 | 100% |
| Iran | 1 | 0 | 1 | 0 | 0% |
| Lebanon | 7 | 1 | 6 | 0 | 14.29% |
| Mongolia | 1 | 1 | 0 | 0 | 100% |
| Qatar | 3 | 0 | 3 | 0 | 0% |
| Saudi Arabia | 3 | 2 | 1 | 0 | 66.67% |
| Uzbekistan | 3 | 3 | 0 | 0 | 100% |
| Total | 20 | 8 | 12 | 0 | 40% |

== See also ==
- Jordan Rugby
- Jordan Rugby website

== External links and references ==
- Jordan Rugby official site
- Jordan on rugbydata.com
