= Kyrgyzstan national rugby union team =

Kyrgyzstan
- Union: Kyrgyzstan Federation of Rugby
Team kit

First international
- Mongolia 21–38 Kyrgyzstan (June 10, 2009)

Largest win
- Mongolia 21–38 Kyrgyzstan (June 10, 2009)

Largest defeat
- Kyrgyzstan 5–115 Kazakhstan (3 July 2022)

The Kyrgyzstan national rugby union team represents Kyrgyzstan in international rugby union. The Kyrgyzstan Federation of Rugby, which governs the sport of rugby in the country, has been a full member of Asia Rugby and an associate member of World Rugby since November 2004.

== Record ==
Below is a table of the representative rugby matches played by a Kyrgyzstan national XV at test level up until 6 July 2022, updated after match with Mongolia.

Opponent	Played	Won	Lost	Drawn	% Won
Iran	1	0	1	0	0%
Kazakhstan	1	0	1	0	0%
Mongolia	2	1	1	0	50%
Pakistan	1	0	1	0	0%
Uzbekistan	3	0	2	1	0%
Total	8	1	6	1	12.5%
