= 2008 Varsity Cup =

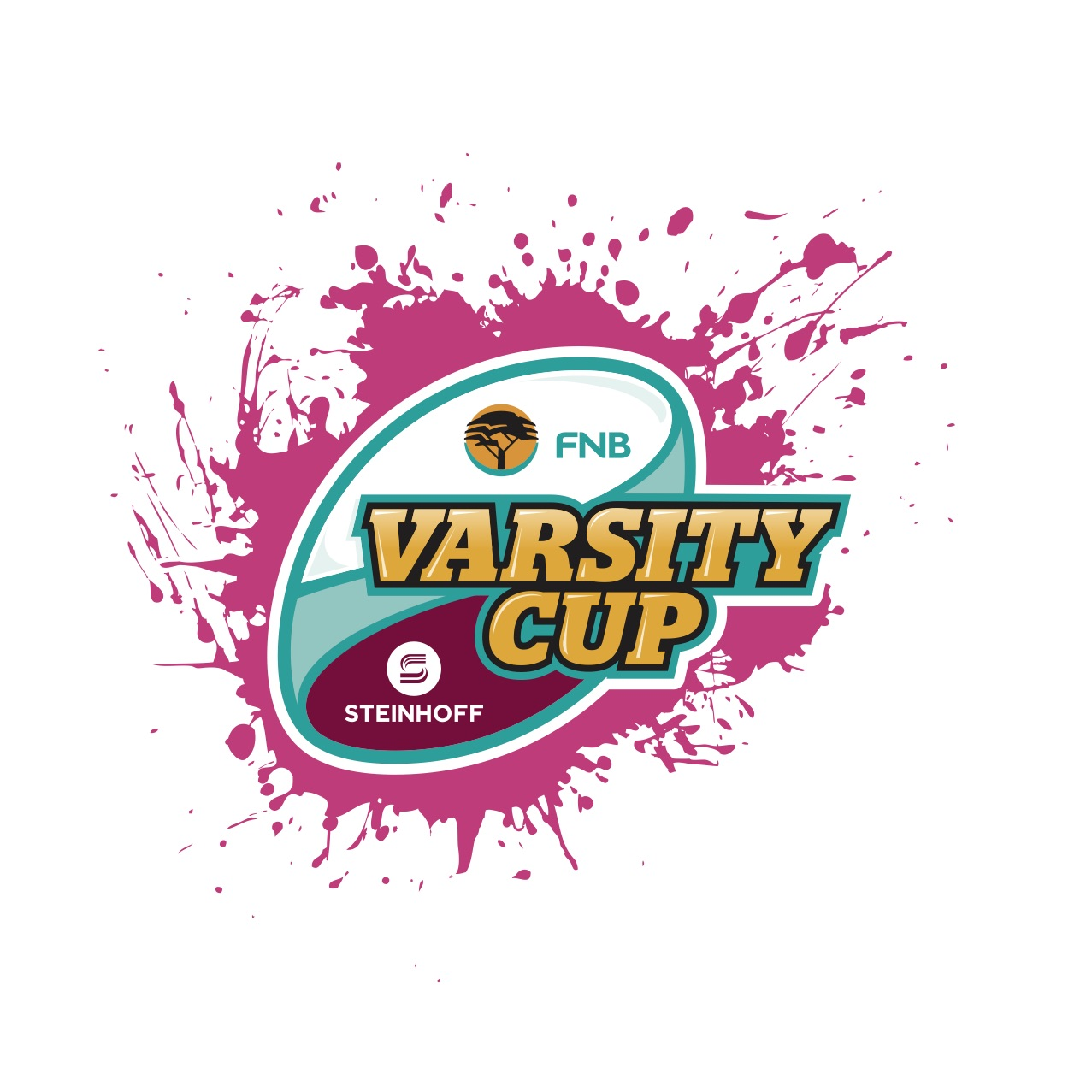
- Countries: South Africa
- Date: 18 February – 7 April 2008
- Champions: Maties (1st title)
- Runners-up: UCT Ikey Tigers
- Matches played: 31
- Tries scored: 218 (average 7 per match)
- Top point scorer: Ryno Luus (94)
- Top try scorer: Mathew Turner (9)

The 2008 Varsity Cup was contested from 18 February to 7 April 2008. The tournament (also known as the FNB Varsity Cup presented by Steinhoff International for sponsorship reasons) was the first season of the Varsity Cup, an annual inter-university rugby union competition featuring eight South African universities.

The tournament was won by Maties, who beat UCT Ikey Tigers 16–10 in the final played on 7 April 2008.

== Competition ==
There were eight participating universities in the 2008 Varsity Cup. These teams played each other once over the course of the season. Most matches were played at the venue for either team, but the Round Five, Six and Seven matches were played at Outeniqua Park in George over the Easter weekend.

Teams received four points for a win and two points for a draw. Bonus points were awarded to teams that scored four or more tries in a game, as well as to teams that lost a match by seven points or less. Teams were ranked by log points, then points difference (points scored less points conceded).

The top four teams qualified for the title play-offs. In the semi-finals, the team that finished first had home advantage against the team that finished fourth, while the team that finished second had home advantage against the team that finished third. The winners of these semi-finals played each other in the final, at the home venue of the higher-placed team.

== Teams ==
Location of teams in the 2008 Varsity Cup

2008 Varsity Cup teams
Team	University	Stadium
Maties	Stellenbosch University	Danie Craven Stadium, Stellenbosch
NMMU Madibaz	Nelson Mandela Metropolitan University	NMMU Stadium, Port Elizabeth
NWU Pukke	North-West University	Fanie du Toit Sport Ground, Potchefstroom
TUT Vikings	Tshwane University of Technology	TUT Stadium, Pretoria
UCT Ikey Tigers	University of Cape Town	UCT Rugby Fields, Cape Town
UFS Shimlas	University of the Free State	Grey College, Bloemfontein
UP Tuks	University of Pretoria	LC de Villiers Stadium, Pretoria
UJ	University of Johannesburg	UJ Stadium, Johannesburg

== Standings ==
2008 Varsity Cup standings
Pos	Team	Pld	W	D	L	PF	PA	PD	TF	TA	TB	LB	Pts
1	UCT Ikey Tigers	7	6	0	1	260	149	+111	37	17	6	1	31
2	Maties	7	4	1	2	231	169	+62	31	20	5	2	25
3	UP Tuks	7	4	1	2	222	191	+31	33	22	6	0	24
4	NWU Pukke	7	5	0	2	209	143	+66	24	18	2	1	23
5	UJ	7	3	0	4	208	225	−17	23	31	3	1	16
6	UFS Shimlas	7	3	0	4	178	173	+5	21	20	3	0	15
7	TUT Vikings	7	2	0	5	122	235	−113	11	32	1	0	9
8	NMMU Madibaz	7	0	0	7	134	279	−145	17	37	2	3	5
* Legend: Pos = Position, Pld = Played, W = Won, D = Drawn, L = Lost, PF = Points for, PA = Points against, PD = Points difference, TF = Tries for, TA = Tries against, TB = Try bonus points, LB = Losing bonus points, Pts = Table points Maties, NWU Pukke, UCT Ikey Tigers and UP Tuks qualified to the semi-finals. Points breakdown: *4 points for a win *2 points for a draw *1 bonus point for a loss by seven points or less *1 bonus point for scoring four or more tries in a match

== Pool stages ==
=== Round 1 ===
18 February 2008
17:30

UCT Ikey Tigers	17–23	NWU Pukke
Try: Marcello Sampson 11' m Mathew Turner (2) 75' m, 78' c Con: Matthew Rosslee (1/3) 79'	Scoreboard	Try: Corné Meyer 18' m Paul Bosch 39' c Markus Fourie 53' m Con: Corné Meyer (1/3) 40'; Pen: Corné Meyer (2/3) 1', 48'; Cards: Grant le Roux (yellow card) 8'; Flippie Pienaar (yellow card) 37'

UCT Rugby Fields, Cape Town
Attendance: 1,000
Referee: Francois Veldsman

18 February 2008
18:45

Maties	31–31	UP Tuks
Try: Pieter Stoffberg 26' m Lucian Cloete (2) 34' m, 49' m Cameron Peverett 53' c Con: Henoe Stoffberg (1/4) 54'; Pen: Henoe Stoffberg (3/4) 17', 30', 40'; Cards: Sarel Potgieter (yellow card) 37' to 47'	Report; Scoreboard	Try: Henk de Ridder 45' m Eben Joubert 64' m Torsten van Jaarsveld 73' c Gerhard van den Heever 76' c Shaun Davids 79' c Con: Chandré Boshoff (3/3) 74', 77', 80'

Danie Craven Stadium, Stellenbosch
Attendance: 17,000
Referee: Jaco Peyper

18 February 2008
18:45

UJ	35–12	TUT Vikings
Try: Yannick Wombo 41' m Wesley Delport 49' c, 54' c Bryan Stephen 70' c Con: Ryno Luus (3/4) 50', 55', 71'; Pen: Ryno Luus (3/4) 5', 11', 40'	Scoreboard	Try: Aubrey McDonald 36' c Jan-Harm Steenkamp 77' m Con: Braam Pretorius (1/2) 37'

UJ Stadium, Johannesburg
Referee: Leon van der Merwe

=== Round 2 ===
23 February 2008
16:30

NWU Pukke	16–18	TUT Vikings
Try: Andries Mahoney 10' c Con: Corné Meyer (1/1) 11'; Pen: Corné Meyer (3/7) 18', 58', 62'; Cards: Grant le Roux (yellow card) 34' to 43'	Scoreboard	Pen: Braam Pretorius (5/5) 5', 26', 34', 51', 60'; Drop: Danie Opperman (1/1) 71'; Cards: Athi Mtya (yellow card) 18' to 28'; Quinton Smit (yellow card) 68' to 78'

Fanie du Toit Sport Ground, Potchefstroom
Attendance: 500
Referee: Tiaan Jonker

25 February 2008
17:30

UCT Ikey Tigers	55–24	UP Tuks
Try: Marvin Christians (4) 3' m, 23' c, 47' c, 76' c Rob Hopwood 38' c, 59' c Herbie Mayosi 42' c JP Koster 71' m Con: Matthew Rosslee (5/6) 24', 39', 43', 48', 59'; Mathew Turner (1/2) 77'; Pen: Mathew Turner (1/1) 74'	Scoreboard	Try: Gerhard van den Heever 30' c Ignick Windvogel 69' m Charl Coetzer 78' c Erich van der Westhuizen 80' m Con: Reinard Kruger (1/2) 31'; Chandré Boshoff (1/2) 79'; Cards: Tom Seabela (yellow card) 13' to 23'

UCT Rugby Fields, Cape Town
Referee: Christie du Preez

23 February 2008
18:00

NMMU Madibaz	24–40	Maties
Try: Craig Ross 26' c William Fick 61' c Morné van der Westhuyzen 80' c Con: Kit Branch (3/3) 27', 62', 80+1'; Pen: Kit Branch (1/1) 37'; Cards: Kenneth Snodgrass (yellow card) 5' to 15'; Wesley Kew (yellow card) 59' to 69'; Kit Branch (yellow card) 65' to 75'	Scoreboard	Try: Jaco Nepgen 9' c Justin Melck 41' c Bennie Booysen 67' c Jowayne van Wyk 75' c Con: Donald Stevens (4/4) 10', 42', 68', 76'; Pen: Donald Stevens (4/5) 2', 6', 18', 79'; Cards: Lisle Clark (yellow card) 77'

NMMU Stadium, Port Elizabeth
Referee: Stuart Berry

25 February 2008
18:45

UJ	6–54	UFS Shimlas
Pen: Ryno Luus (2/2) 31', 35'	Scoreboard	Try: Shagen Windvogel 3' m, 25' m, 73' c Robert Ebersohn 43' c Jacko Jackson 47' c Wilton Pietersen 63' c Coenie Oosthuizen 71' c Con: Sias Ebersohn (5/7) 44', 48', 64', 72', 74'; Pen: Sias Ebersohn (1/3) 9'; Drop: Sias Ebersohn (2/3) 16', 42'

UJ Stadium, Johannesburg
Referee: Jerome America

=== Round 3 ===
1 March 2008
16:30

UP Tuks	32–14	UFS Shimlas
Try: Jamie MacKenzie (3) 8' c, 24' c, 27' m Pieter Booysen 29' c Con: Chandré Boshoff (3/4) 9', 25', 30'; Pen: Chandré Boshoff (1/1) 18'; Joey Mongalo (1/2) 50'; Cards: Eben Joubert (yellow card) 13' to 23'; Charl Coetzer (yellow card) 48' to 58'; Torsten van Jaarsveld (yellow card) 74'	Scoreboard	Try: Danny Theron 15' c Wouter Stieger 52' c Con: Sias Ebersohn (1/1) 16'; Boer van Niekerk (1/1) 53'; Cards: Hercholl Johnson (yellow card) 69'

LC de Villiers Stadium, Pretoria
Attendance: 500
Referee: Deon van Blommestein

3 March 2008
18:45

NWU Pukke	31–24	Maties
Try: Nelis Nel 9' c Lolo Waka 37' m Stoffel Duvenage 53' c Con: Corné Meyer (2/3) 10', 54'; Pen: Corné Meyer (4/5) 22', 45', 63', 68'; Cards: BG Uys (yellow card) 70'	Report; Scoreboard	Try: Wesley Wilkins (3) 16' c, 65' c, 78' c Con: Donald Stevens (1/1) 17'; Sarel Potgieter (2/2) 66', 79'; Pen: Sarel Potgieter (1/1) 60'

Fanie du Toit Sport Ground, Potchefstroom
Attendance: 15,000
Referee: Francois Veldsman

3 March 2008
18:45

UJ	31–34	UCT Ikey Tigers
Try: Jaco Snyman 26' m, 39' c André Smith 61' c Con: Ryno Luus (2/3) 40', 62'; Pen: Ryno Luus (3/3) 12', 19', 35'; Drop: André Smith (1/2) 15'	Scoreboard	Try: Matthew Rosslee (2) 49' c, 57' c Marcello Sampson (2) 64' c, 72' c Con: Matthew Rosslee (4/4) 50', 58', 65', 73'; Pen: Matthew Rosslee (2/2) 5', 80'; Cards: Danie van der Merwe (yellow card) 35'

UJ Stadium, Johannesburg
Attendance: 0
Referee: Jaco Peyper

3 March 2008
20:00

TUT Vikings	31–26	NMMU Madibaz
Try: Penalty try 1' c Danie Crous 5' m Athi Mtya 22' c Jannie Cloete 44' m Bovril de Bruin 49' c Con: Danie Opperman (1/1) 2'; Braam Pretorius (2/4) 23', 50'; Cards: Quinton Smit (yellow card) 69'; Petrus Johannes Hendrik du Plessis (yellow card) 71'; Aubrey McDonald (yellow card) 76'	Scoreboard	Try: Dwayne Cruickshank 15' c Tashrique Hearne 37' c Dan Howitz 56' m Wade Roos 79' c Con: Kit Branch (3/4) 16', 38', 80'; Cards: Tashrique Hearne (yellow card) 76'

TUT Stadium, Pretoria
Referee: Willie Roos

=== Round 4 ===
8 March 2008
15:30

UP Tuks	19–41	UJ
Try: Johan Jackson 12' c Warwick Tecklenburg 78' m Con: Chandré Boshoff (1/2) 13'; Pen: Chandré Boshoff (2/2) 2', 22'; Cards: Pieter van der Merwe (yellow card) 44' to 54'	Report; Scoreboard	Try: Ryno Luus (2) 14' c, 64' c Ghaliel Markus 55' c Hennie Oosthuizen 80' m Con: Ryno Luus (3/4) 15', 56', 65'; Pen: Ryno Luus (4/5) 4', 8', 39', 45'; Cards: Jaco Snyman (yellow card) 16' to 26'

LC de Villiers Stadium, Pretoria
Referee: Leon van der Merwe

8 March 2008
18:15

Maties	27–11	UFS Shimlas
Try: Sarel Potgieter 32' c, 46' c Therlow Pietersen 53' c Con: Sarel Potgieter (3/3) 33', 47', 54'; Pen: Sarel Potgieter (2/2) 22', 30'	Scoreboard	Try: Cameron Jacobs 80' m Pen: Jan du Toit (2/2) 9', 36'; Cards: Marlin Ruiters (yellow card) 4' to 14'

Danie Craven Stadium, Stellenbosch
Attendance: 3,000
Referee: Chris Healy

10 March 2008
18:45

NMMU Madibaz	21–26	NWU Pukke
Try: Dwayne Cruickshank 2' m Morné van der Westhuyzen 58' c Con: Michael Gallinetti (1/2) 59'; Pen: Michael Gallinetti (2/5) 13', 24'; Drop: Kit Branch (1/1) 22'; Cards: Allistair Langson (yellow card) 78'	Scoreboard	Try: Lolo Waka (2) 7' c, 38' m Nelis Nel 36' m Con: Jean Tiedt (1/3) 8'; Pen: Jean Tiedt (2/2) 11', 44'; Dewan Eckard (1/1) 66'

NMMU Stadium, Port Elizabeth
Referee: Joey Salmans

10 March 2008
18:45

TUT Vikings	16–52	UCT Ikey Tigers
Try: Jannie Cloete 59' c Con: Braam Pretorius (1/1) 60'; Pen: Braam Pretorius (3/4) 3', 7', 30'; Cards: Danie Opperman (yellow card) 37' to 47'; Jacques van Rooyen (yellow card) 69' to 79'	Scoreboard	Try: Tim Whitehead 12' c Mathew Turner (3) 21' m, 46' m, 63' c Pieter Engelbrecht 33' c Danie van der Merwe 42' c Marcello Sampson 55' c Penalty try 68' c Con: Matthew Rosslee (6/8) 13', 34', 43', 56', 64', 69'

TUT Stadium, Pretoria
Referee: Archie Sehlako

=== Round 1 (rescheduled) ===
15 March 2008
16:00

UFS Shimlas	41–36	NMMU Madibaz
Try: Rowan Walters 5' m Vaatjie Koorsen 30' c Wouter Stieger 44' c Hadley Smith 46' c Con: Jan du Toit (3/4) 31', 45', 47'; Pen: Jan du Toit (5/5) 9', 42', 57', 64', 75'; Cards: Frans la Grange (yellow card) 52' to 62'; Theo Cwaile (yellow card) 76'	Scoreboard	Try: Clifford Reed 1' c Dan Howitz 20' m Kenneth Snodgrass 36' c Zip Lalendle 53' c André Goosen 70' c Con: Michael Gallinetti (4/5) 2', 37', 54', 71'; Pen: Michael Gallinetti (1/2) 73'; Cards: Reynier Zietsman (yellow card) 76'

Grey College, Bloemfontein
Attendance: 500
Referee: Mlungiseleli Mdashe

=== Round 5 ===
20 March 2008
13:00

TUT Vikings	9–20	UFS Shimlas
Pen: Braam Pretorius (3/3) 34', 38', 48'	Scoreboard	Try: Ruan Jacobs 14' c Cameron Jacobs 32' c Con: Sias Ebersohn (2/2) 15', 33'; Pen: Sias Ebersohn (1/3) 6'; Boer van Niekerk (1/1) 78'; Cards: Freddie Markram (yellow card) 13' to 23'

Outeniqua Park, George
Attendance: 5,000
Referee: Mtheleni Msileni

20 March 2008
15:00

UCT Ikey Tigers	38–34	Maties
Try: Danie van der Merwe 19' c Craig Kleu 34' c Herbie Mayosi 47' c Dane Galley 63' c Marcello Sampson 74' c Con: Matthew Rosslee (5/5) 20', 35', 48', 64', 75'; Pen: Matthew Rosslee (1/2) 43'; Cards: JJ Gagiano (yellow card) 78'	Scoreboard	Try: Coenie van Wyk 15' c Therlow Pietersen 39' c Jaco Nepgen 57' c Andrew Crausaz 79' c Con: Sarel Potgieter (4/4) 16', 40', 58', 79'; Pen: Sarel Potgieter (2/2) 1', 6'; Cards: De Kock Steenkamp (yellow card) 29'

Outeniqua Park, George
Attendance: 5,000
Referee: Tiaan Jonker

20 March 2008
17:00

NWU Pukke	11–25	UP Tuks
Try: Andries Mahoney 12' m Pen: Corné Meyer (2/3) 7', 17'; Cards: Frikkie Maartens (red card) 44'; Wayne Wilschut (yellow card) 78'	Scoreboard	Try: Pieter Booysen 49' m Johan Jackson 62' m Oscar Mfundisi 65' m Gert Lubbe 72' c Con: Chandré Boshoff (1/1) 73'; Pen: Joey Mongalo (1/2) 32'; Cards: Eben Joubert (yellow card) 6' to 16'; Pieter van der Merwe (yellow card) 57' to 67'

Outeniqua Park, George
Attendance: 2,000
Referee: Lourens van der Merwe

20 March 2008
19:00

NMMU Madibaz	7–57	UJ
Try: Zip Lalendle 41' c Con: Richard Rijs (1/1) 42'; Cards: Clifford Reed (yellow card) 22' to 32' (red card) 59'; Kenneth Snodgrass (yellow card) 70' to 79'	Scoreboard	Try: Bernado Botha (2) 8' c, 30' m Brett Claassens 37' c Matthew van Zyl 50' m Hennie Oosthuizen (2) 64' c, 80' c Derek Harwood 71' m Deon Assegaai 73' m Con: Ryno Luus (4/8) 9', 38', 65', 80+1'; Pen: Ryno Luus (2/3) 22', 28'; Drop: André Smith (1/1) 47'

Outeniqua Park, George
Referee: Joey Salmans

=== Round 6 ===
22 March 2008
11:00

NMMU Madibaz	7–36	UCT Ikey Tigers
Try: Morné van der Westhuyzen 56' c Con: Michael Gallinetti (1/1) 57'; Cards: Wesley Kew (yellow card) 68' to 78'; Tashrique Hearne (yellow card) 73'	Scoreboard	Try: Marcello Sampson 7' m Rob Hopwood (2) 33' c, 78' c Kyle Wickins 65' c Mathew Turner 76' c Con: Mathew Turner (1/2) 34'; Matthew Rosslee (3/3) 66', 77', 79'; Pen: Matthew Rosslee (1/1) 52'; Cards: Don Armand (yellow card) 60' to 70'; Kyle Wickins (yellow card) 68' to 78'

Outeniqua Park, George
Attendance: 2,000
Referee: Lourens van der Merwe

22 March 2008
12:40

UP Tuks	43–26	TUT Vikings
Try: Oscar Mfundisi 10' c Duncan Naudé 13' m Pieter Booysen (2) 36' c, 46' m Gerhard van den Heever 71' m Johan van Heerden 79' m Con: Joey Mongalo (2/5) 11', 37'; Pen: Joey Mongalo (3/3) 4', 19', 24'; Cards: Torsten van Jaarsveld (yellow card) 33' to 43'; Gert Lubbe (yellow card) 77'	Scoreboard	Try: Braam Pretorius 48' c Lex Kirsten 57' c Con: Braam Pretorius (2/2) 49', 58'; Pen: Braam Pretorius (4/4) 28', 30', 33', 60'

Outeniqua Park, George
Attendance: 5,000
Referee: Tiaan Jonker

22 March 2008
14:20

NWU Pukke	35–24	UFS Shimlas
Try: Lolo Waka 4' c Andries Mahoney 50' m Wouter Watermeyer 68' c Willem Barnard 75' c Con: Jean Tiedt (3/4) 5', 69', 76'; Pen: Jean Tiedt (3/6) 19', 22', 41'; Cards: Paul Bosch (yellow card) 79'	Scoreboard	Try: Rowan Walters (2) 12' c, 52' m PW van Vuuren 37' c Wayne Stevens 45' m Con: Sias Ebersohn (2/2) 13', 38'; Cards: Frans la Grange (yellow card) 35' to 46'

Outeniqua Park, George
Attendance: 5,000
Referee: Joey Salmans

22 March 2008
17:00

Maties	32–24	UJ
Try: Llewellyn Winckler (2) 19' m, 57' m Morné Jooste 21' m Therlow Pietersen 42' m Sarel Potgieter 44' m Jean Stemmet 52' c Con: Coenie van Wyk (1/4) 53'	Scoreboard	Try: Hennie Oosthuizen 15' c Jaco Snyman 63' m Con: Ryno Luus (1/2) 16'; Pen: Ryno Luus (4/4) 10', 25', 28', 54'; Cards: Derick Minnie (yellow card) 70' to 80'

Outeniqua Park, George
Attendance: 5,000
Referee: Mtheleni Msileni

=== Round 7 ===
24 March 2008
08:00

NMMU Madibaz	13–48	UP Tuks
Try: Wesley Kew 46' c Con: Michael Gallinetti (1/1) 47'; Pen: Michael Gallinetti (2/5) 13', 40'	Scoreboard	Try: Gert Lubbe 32' m Pieter Booysen 36' c Warwick Tecklenburg 42' c Johan Jackson (3) 47' m, 71' c, 79' m Johan van Heerden 65' c Sisa Mafu 76' m Con: Joey Mongalo (4/7) 37', 43', 66', 72'

Outeniqua Park, George
Attendance: 450
Referee: Joey Salmans

24 March 2008
10:30

NWU Pukke	67–14	UJ
Try: Willem van der Wal (2) 10' m, 55' c Grant le Roux (2) 16' c, 76' c Willem Barnard 26' m Jean Tiedt (2) 34' c, 67' m Wouter Watermeyer 51' m Dewan Eckard 80+1' c Con: Jean Tiedt (5/9) 17', 35', 56', 77', 80+2'; Pen: Jean Tiedt (4/5) 5', 22', 48', 63'; Cards: Dirco Rautenbach (yellow card) 80'	Report; Scoreboard	Try: Derick Minnie 14' c Jacobus de Wet 70' c Con: Ryno Luus (2/2) 15', 71'; Cards: Bernado Botha (yellow card) 62' to 72'

Outeniqua Park, George
Attendance: 2,000
Referee: Lourens van der Merwe

24 March 2008
12:30

TUT Vikings	10–43	Maties
Try: Vainon Willis 71' c Con: James Watt (1/1) 72'; Pen: Braam Pretorius (1/2) 50'; Cards: Aubrey McDonald (yellow card) 34' to 44'; Danie Crous (yellow card) 47' to 57'	Scoreboard	Try: Coenie van Wyk 18' c Llewellyn Winckler 27' m Zandré Jordaan 35' m Matthew Dobson 51' m Wilhelm Koch 60' c Andy Russel 63' c Jean Stemmet 79' c Con: Sarel Potgieter (1/3) 19'; Therlow Pietersen (3/4) 61', 64', 80'; Cards: Matthew Dobson (yellow card) 56' to 66'; Andrew Crausaz (yellow card) 72'

Outeniqua Park, George
Attendance: 2,000
Referee: Mtheleni Msileni

24 March 2008
16:00

UCT Ikey Tigers	28–14	UFS Shimlas
Try: Wesley Chetty 8' c JJ Gagiano 21' m James Martin 35' m Justin Bijl 57' m Con: Kyle Wickins (1/3) 9'; Pen: Danie van der Merwe (2/2) 50', 75'	Scoreboard	Try: Rowan Walters 32' m Pen: Jan du Toit (3/4) 2', 6', 38'; Cards: Theo Cwaile (yellow card) 52' to 62'

Outeniqua Park, George
Attendance: 2,500
Referee: Tiaan Jonker

== Play-offs ==
Semi-finals
31 March 2008
UCT Ikey Tigers	32
NWU Pukke	31
31 March 2008
Maties	47
UP Tuks	44

Final
07 April 2008
Maties	16
UCT Ikey Tigers	10

=== Semi-finals ===
31 March 2008
14:45

UCT Ikey Tigers	32–31	NWU Pukke
Try: Mathew Turner (2) 14' c, 75' m Mark Goosen 59' c Marcello Sampson 64' c Con: Matthew Rosslee (3/4) 15', 60', 65'; Pen: Matthew Rosslee (2/2) 28', 80'	Report; Scoreboard	Try: Lolo Waka (2) 3' c, 6' c Jean Tiedt 56' m Con: Jean Tiedt (2/3) 4', 7'; Pen: Jean Tiedt (4/4) 10', 24', 26', 45'; Cards: Grant le Roux (yellow card) 32' to 42'

UCT Rugby Fields, Cape Town
Attendance: 0
Referee: Tiaan Jonker

31 March 2008
18:45

UP Tuks	44–47	Maties
Try: Gert Lubbe 21' c Johan van Heerden (2) 44' c, 57' c Gerhard van den Heever (2) 52' m, 67' m Oscar Mfundisi 78' c Con: Chandré Boshoff (3/5) 22', 45', 58'; Joey Mongalo (1/1) 79'; Pen: Chandré Boshoff (2/2) 19', 30'	Scoreboard	Try: Jean Stemmet 8' c Jonathan Adendorf 28' c Sarel Potgieter 36' c Wilhelm Koch 41' c Henoe Stoffberg 72' c Con: Henoe Stoffberg (5/5) 9', 29', 37', 42', 73'; Pen: Henoe Stoffberg (4/5) 49', 61', 70', 99'

Danie Craven Stadium, Stellenbosch
Referee: Joey Salmans

=== Final ===
7 April 2008
18:45

UCT Ikey Tigers	10–16	Maties
Try: Marcello Sampson 22' m Mathew Turner 62' m Cards: Herbie Mayosi (yellow card) 8' to 19'	Report	Try: Morné Jooste 80+2' c Con: Ricardo Croy (1/1) 80+3'; Pen: Henoe Stoffberg (2/2) 9', 33'; Drop: Ricardo Croy (1/1) 71'; Cards: Sarel Potgieter (yellow card) 21' to 29'

Danie Craven Stadium, Stellenbosch
Attendance: 20,000
Referee: Lourens van der Merwe

Maties	UCT

FB	15	Joe Pietersen
RW	14	Hendrik Stoffberg
OC	13	Juan de Jongh
IC	12	Sarel Potgieter
LW	11	Morne Jooste
FH	10	Ricardo Croy
SH	9	Wilhelm Koch
N8	8	Bennie Booysen (c)
OF	7	Jonathan Adendorf
BF	6	Zandre Jordaan
RL	5	Jaco Nepgen
LL	4	Erich Laubscher
TP	3	Jacobie Adriaanse
HK	2	Lisle Clark
LP	1	Johan Roets
Replacements:
	16	Matthew Dobson
	17	Andrew Crausaz
	18	De Kock Steenkamp
	19	Albert Fullard
	20	Coenie van Wyk
	21	Jean Stemmet
	22	Therlow Pietersen
Coach:
Chean Roux

FB	15	Rob Hopwood
RW	14	Marcello Sampson
OC	13	James Martin
IC	12	Pieter Engelbrecht
LW	11	Mat Turner
FH	10	Matt Rosslee
SH	9	Danie van der Merwe
N8	8	JJ Gagiano (c)
OF	7	Mzothando Simani
BF	6	Enoch Panya
RL	5	Martin Muller
LL	4	Michael Ledwidge
TP	3	Dylan Rogers
HK	2	John Peter Koster
LP	1	Herbie Mayosi
Replacements:
	16	Mark Goosen
	17	Wesley Chetty
	18	Dane Galley
	19	Kyle Brown
	20	Kyle Wickins
	21	Tim Whitehead
	22	Peter Haw
	23	Hein van der Merwe
Coach:
John Dobson

Player of the Match:
Not documented Maties

Assistant referees:
François Veldsman & Dilbert November (South Africa), Neville Heilbron (South Africa)

Television match official:
Shaun Veldsman (South Africa)

== Statistics ==
All point scorers
No	Player	Team	T	C	P	DG	Pts
1	Ryno Luus	UJ	2	15	18	0	94
2	Matthew Rosslee	UCT Ikey Tigers	2	27	6	0	82
3	Jean Tiedt	NWU Pukke	3	11	13	0	76
4	Braam Pretorius	TUT Vikings	1	6	16	0	65
5	Sarel Potgieter	Maties	4	10	5	0	55
6	Mathew Turner	UCT Ikey Tigers	9	2	1	0	52
7	Corné Meyer	NWU Pukke	1	4	11	0	46
8	Henoe Stoffberg	Maties	1	6	9	0	44
9	Marcello Sampson	UCT Ikey Tigers	8	0	0	0	40
10	Chandré Boshoff	UP Tuks	0	12	5	0	39
* Legend: T = Tries, C = Conversions, P = Penalties, DG = Drop Goals, Pts = Points.

== See also ==
- Varsity Cup
