= 2018 Asia Rugby Championship =

- Date: 28 April – 2 June
- Countries: Hong Kong; Malaysia; South Korea

Final positions
- Champions: Hong Kong (1st title)

Tournament statistics
- Matches played: 6
- Tries scored: 51 (8.5 per match)
- Top scorer(s): (Hong Kong) Matthew Rosslee (58)
- Most tries: (Hong Kong) Conor Hartley (4) (South Korea) Jang Jeong-min (4) (Hong Kong) Liam Slatem (4)
- Website: www.asiarugby.com

The 2018 Asia Rugby Championship was the fourth annual rugby union series for the top-level Asia Rugby nations. The Asia Rugby Championship in 2018 formed part of the World Cup qualifying process and, as such, did not include Japan who had already qualified as the 2019 Rugby World Cup host. Hong Kong and South Korea were joined by Malaysia, promoted from Division 1, to compete in the 2018 series. Other Asian nations played in the lower division tournaments.

The format of the tri-nations series is a double round-robin where the three teams play each other twice on a home and away basis. The team finishing on top of the standings at the end of the series is declared the winner. The 2018 series winner Hong Kong advanced to a cross-regional play-off series against Oceania 4, Cook Islands, to earn a berth in the repechage tournament.

== Teams ==
The teams involved, with their world rankings prior to the 2018 tournament in brackets:

Nation	Home stadium	City	Head coach	Captain
Hong Kong (22)	Hong Kong Football Club Stadium	Hong Kong	(Wales) Leigh Jones	James Cunningham
South Korea (31)	Incheon Namdong Asiad Rugby Field	Incheon	(South Korea) Choi Changryul	Lee Yong-seung
Malaysia (45)	National Stadium	Kuala Lumpur	(Malaysia) Lee Nyuk Fah	Mohd Syahir Asraf Rosli

== Standings ==
Advances to Cross-regional play-off series

Pos	Nation	Games				Points			Bonus points	Total points
Pos	Nation	Played	Won	Lost	Drawn	For	Against	Diff	Bonus points	Total points
1	Hong Kong	4	4	0	0	227	44	+183	3	19
2	South Korea	4	2	2	0	128	91	+37	2	10
3	Malaysia	4	0	4	0	40	260	-220	0	0
Points were awarded to the teams as follows: Win - 4 points Draw - 2 points 4 or more tries - 1 point Loss within 7 points - 1 point Loss greater than 7 points - 0 points

== Fixtures ==
Source: asiarugby.com

=== Week 1 ===
28 April 2018
16:30 MST (UTC+8)

Malaysia	10–35	South Korea
Try: Vunimoku 61' c Con: Bin Sudin 62'; Pen: Bin Sudin 70'	Report	Try: Jang Jeong-min 9' m, 48' c Penalty try 25'; Kim Kwang-sik 80' c Con: Oh Youn-hyung 49', 80' (2/3); Pen: Oh Youn-hyung 3', 21', 37'

National Stadium, Kuala Lumpur
Attendance: 15000
Referee: Tim Baker (Hong Kong)

FB	15	Muhamad Amirul Aqil Kamsol
RW	14	Mohamad Aiman Jamaluddin
OC	13	Vatimio Rabebe
IC	12	Sakiusa Terence Gavidi
LW	11	Mohd Azmir Zanul Abdin
FH	10	Mohd Syahir Asraf Rosli (c)
SH	9	Muhd Nur Ikqwan Nordin
N8	8	Timoci Vunimoku
OF	7	Mohamad Amin Jamaluddin
BF	6	Sae Faalupega
RL	5	Nathanael Tan Aik Ming
LL	4	Aporosa Duwailea
TP	3	Mohd Aliff Al Hafiz Abdul Kari
HK	2	Amirul Mukminim Amizan
LP	1	Amirul Sani	(yellow card) 41' to 51'
Replacements:
	16	Mohd Nurazman Ramli
	17	Mohd Farid Sujari
	18	Lawrence Petrus
	19	Syarif Nurhidayat Muzhaimey
	20	Mohamad Syarif Saiful Aazwan Bin Sudin
	21	Mohammad Rosmanizam Roslan
	22	Aliff Sazrie Bin Azmi
	23	Mohamad Sofian Mohd Kamil
Coach:
(Malaysia) Lee Nyuk Fah

FB	15	Lee Jae-bok
RW	14	Jang Jeong-min
OC	13	Lee Jin-kyu
IC	12	Kim Nam-uk
LW	11	Kang Jin-gu
FH	10	Oh Youn-hyung
SH	9	Lee Myung-jun
N8	8	Lee Yong-seung (c)
OF	7	Jang Seok-hwan
BF	6	Kim Hyun-soo
RL	5	Lee Jin-seok
LL	4	Kim Ho-bum
TP	3	Kang Tae-hyeon
HK	2	Kim Jeep
LP	1	Na Kwan-young
Replacements:
	16	Seok Dong-hee
	17	Kim Kwang-sik
	18	Park Jong-yeol	(yellow card) 66' to 76'
	19	Cha Sung-kun
	20	You Ji-hoon
	21	Shin Ki-cheol
	22	Kim Jin-hyeok
	23	Jang Seong-min
Coach:
(South Korea) Choi Chang-ryul

=== Week 2 ===
5 May 2018
16:30 MST (UTC+8)

Malaysia	8–67	Hong Kong
Try: Saukuru 36' m Pen: Bin Sudin 77'	Report	Try: Lamboley 15' m, 28' m Neville 32' c Slatem 40' c Yiu 43' c, 48' m Pincott 51' c Hartley 61' c J Parfitt 67' c Keith 69' c Con: Rosslee 33', 40', 44', 52', 62', 68' 71' (7/10); Pen: Rosslee 23'

National Stadium, Kuala Lumpur
Attendance: 15000
Referee: Shuhei Kubo (Japan)

FB	15	Samuela Tamanisau
RW	14	Mohd Azmir Zanul Abdin
OC	13	Vatimio Rabebe
IC	12	Sakiusa Terence Gavidi
LW	11	Mohamad Aiman Jamaluddin
FH	10	Mohd Syahir Asraf Rosli (c)
SH	9	Muhd Nur Ikqwan Nordin
N8	8	Etonia Vaqa Saukuru
OF	7	Syarif Nurhidayat Muzhaimey
BF	6	Timoci Vunimoku
RL	5	Sae Faalupega
LL	4	Aporosa Duwailea	(yellow card) 13' to 23'
TP	3	Mohd Aliff Al Hafiz Abdul Karim
HK	2	Amirul Mukminim Amizan
LP	1	Amirul Sani
Replacements:
	16	Mohd Nurazman Ramli
	17	Mohd Farid Sujari
	18	Lawrence Petrus
	19	Mohamad Amin Jamaluddin
	20	Syahmi Afiq Edan
	21	Mohamad Syarif Saiful Aazwan Bin Sudin
	22	Aliff Sazrie Bin Azmi
	23	Asyraf Norudin
Coach:
(Malaysia) Lee Nyuk Fah

FB	15	Jack Neville
RW	14	Salom Yiu Kam Shing
OC	13	Tyler Spitz
IC	12	Max Woodward
LW	11	Max Denmark
FH	10	Matthew Rosslee
SH	9	Liam Slatem
N8	8	Thomas Lamboley
OF	7	Toby Fenn
BF	6	Nicholas Hewson
RL	5	Jamie Pincott
LL	4	James Cunningham (c)
TP	3	Dylan Rogers
HK	2	Benjamin Roberts
LP	1	Daniel Barlow
Replacements:
	16	Alexander Harris
	17	Adam Fullgrabe
	18	Jack Parfitt
	19	Kyle Sullivan
	20	Michael Parfitt
	21	Conor Hartley
	22	Robert Keith
	23	Jamie Lauder
Coach:
(Wales) Leigh Jones

=== Week 3 ===
12 May 2018
16:30 KST (UTC+9)

South Korea	21–30	Hong Kong
Try: Jang Jeong-min 10' c Lee Yong-seung 49' c Lee Jae-bok 61' c Con: Oh Youn-hyung 12', 50', 61' (3/3)	Report	Try: Spitz 24' m Slatem 37' c Con: Rosslee 38' (1/2); Pen: Rosslee 4', 19', 31', 44', 58', 68'

Namdong Asiad Rugby Stadium, Incheon
Attendance: 1000
Referee: Shuhei Kubo (Japan)

FB	15	Lee Jae-bok
RW	14	Jang Jeong-min
OC	13	Kim Jin-hyeok
IC	12	Kim Nam-uk
LW	11	Kang Jin-gu
FH	10	Oh Youn-hyung
SH	9	Lee Myung-jun
N8	8	Lee Yong-seung (c)
OF	7	Jang Seok-hwan
BF	6	Cha Sung-kun	(yellow card) 35' to 45'
RL	5	Lee Jin-seok
LL	4	Kim Ho-bum
TP	3	Kang Tae-hyeon
HK	2	Kim Jeep
LP	1	Na Kwan-young
Replacements:
	16	Seok Dong-hee
	17	Kim Kwang-sik
	18	Park Jong-yeol
	19	Han Kun-kyu
	20	Kim Jeong-min
	21	Shin Ki-cheol
	22	Park Hong-sik
	23	Jang Seong-min
Coach:
(South Korea) Choi Chang-ryul

FB	15	Jack Neville
RW	14	Salom Yiu Kam Shing
OC	13	Tyler Spitz
IC	12	Max Woodward
LW	11	Max Denmark
FH	10	Matthew Rosslee
SH	9	Liam Slatem
N8	8	Thomas Lamboley
OF	7	Toby Fenn
BF	6	Nicholas Hewson
RL	5	Kyle Sullivan
LL	4	James Cunningham (c)
TP	3	Dylan Rogers
HK	2	Benjamin Roberts
LP	1	Daniel Barlow
Replacements:
	16	Alexander Harris
	17	Adam Fullgrabe
	18	Jack Parfitt
	19	Jamie Pincott
	20	Kane Boucaut
	21	Conor Hartley
	22	Ben Rimene
	23	Jamie Lauder
	24	Michael Parfitt
Coach:
(Wales) Leigh Jones

=== Week 4 ===
19 May 2018
16:30 KST (UTC+9)

South Korea	67–12	Malaysia
Try: Jang Seong-min 6' c, 18' c Kim Ho-bum 24' c Kim Nam-uk 29' c, 70' c Lee Jae-bok 34' c Jang Jeong-min 56' c Kim Jeong-min 64' m Kim Jin-hyeok 75' c Con: Oh Youn-hyung 7', 19', 26', 30', 35', 57', 71', 76' (8/9); Pen: Oh Youn-hyung 47'; Drop: Oh Youn-hyung 68'	Report	Try: Tamanisau 42' c Mohamad Aiman Jamaluddin 73' m Con: Kamsol 43' (1/2)

Namdong Asiad Rugby Stadium, Incheon
Referee: Stephen Copeman (Hong Kong)

FB	15	Lee Jae-bok
RW	14	Jang Jeong-min
OC	13	Kim Jin-hyeok
IC	12	Jang Seong-min
LW	11	Kim Nam-uk
FH	10	Oh Youn-hyung
SH	9	Shin Ki-cheol
N8	8	Lee Yong-seung (c)
OF	7	Hwang In-jo
BF	6	Cha Sung-kun
RL	5	Jang Seok-hwan
LL	4	Kim Ho-bum
TP	3	Park Jong-yeol
HK	2	You Ji-hoon
LP	1	Na Kwan-young
Replacements:
	16	Noh Ok-gi
	17	Seok Dong-hee
	18	Kang Taehyeon
	19	Lee Kwang-ho
	20	Kim Jeong-min
	21	Lee Myung-jun
	22	Kim Kun-hui
	23	Shin Min-su
Coach:
(South Korea) Choi Chang-ryul

FB	15	Muhamad Amirul Aqil Kamsol
RW	14	Mohamad Aiman Jamaluddin
OC	13	Samuela Tamanisau
IC	12	Vatimio Rabebe
LW	11	Mohd Azmir Zanul Abdin (c)
FH	10	Mohd Syahir Asraf Rosli
SH	9	Muhd Nur Ikqwan Nordin
N8	8	Etonia Vaqa Saukuru
OF	7	Syarif Nurhidayat Muzhaimey
BF	6	Timoci Vunimoku
RL	5	Sae Faalupega
LL	4	Muhammad Danial Noor Hamidi	(yellow card) 20' to 30'
TP	3	Mohd Aliff Al Hafiz Abdul Karim
HK	2	Amirul Mukminim Amizan
LP	1	Lawrence Petrus
Replacements:
	16	Mohd Nurazman Ramli
	17	Mohd Farid Sujari
	18	Nas Affie Mohd Salleh
	19	Mohamad Amin Jamaluddin
	20	Hamizan Rosli
	21	Mohamad Syarif Saiful Aazwan Bin Sudin
	22	Aliff Sazrie Bin Azmi
	23	Asyraf Norudin
Coach:
(Malaysia) Lee Nyuk Fah

=== Week 5 ===
26 May 2018
16:00 HKT (UTC+8)

Hong Kong	91–10	Malaysia
Try: Pincott 3' c Denmark 6' c Hartley 16' c, 19' c, 43' c Lauder 20' c, 75' c Penalty try 26'; Tsang 30' c Delaforce 53' c Neville 57' c Keith 66' c Fullgrabe 80' c Con: Rimene 4', 17', 20', 21', 31', 44', 54', 58', 67', 76', 80' (11/11); Rosslee 7' (1/1)	Report	Try: Saukuru 33' c Con: Bin Sudin 34'; Pen: Kamsol 61'

Hong Kong Football Club Stadium, Hong Kong
Referee: Shuhei Kubo (Japan)

FB	15	Robert Keith
RW	14	Conor Hartley
OC	13	Tyler Spitz
IC	12	Matthew Rosslee
LW	11	Max Denmark
FH	10	Ben Rimene
SH	9	Jamie Lauder
N8	8	Kane Boucaut
OF	7	Philip Whitfield
BF	6	Nicholas Hewson
RL	5	Jack Delaforce
LL	4	Jamie Pincott
TP	3	Jack Parfitt
HK	2	Jamie Tsang (c)
LP	1	Adam Fullgrabe
Replacements:
	16	Edward Soppet
	17	Callum McFeat-Smith
	18	Ronan Donnelly
	19	Thomas Lamboley
	20	Michael Parfitt
	21	Cris Pierrepont
	22	Henry Poon Yau Him
	23	Jack Neville
	24	Kyle Sullivan
Coach:
(Wales) Leigh Jones

FB	15	Mohamad Aiman Jamaluddin
RW	14	Samuela Tamanisau	(yellow card) 13' to 23'
OC	13	Vatimio Rabebe
IC	12	Atunasia Lacadamu Takubu
LW	11	Mohd Azmir Zanul Abdin
FH	10	Mohd Syahir Asraf Rosli (c)
SH	9	Aliff Sazrie Bin Azmi
N8	8	Etonia Vaqa Saukuru
OF	7	Mohamad Syarif Saiful Aazwan Bin Sudin
BF	6	Timoci Vunimoku
RL	5	Sae Faalupega
LL	4	Mohd Aliff Al Hafiz Abdul Karim	(yellow card) 50' to 60'
TP	3	Lawrence Petrus
HK	2	Amirul Mukminim Amizan
LP	1	Mohd Farid Sujari
Replacements:
	16	Mohd Nurazman Ramli
	17	Hamizan Rosli
	18	Nas Affie Mohd Salleh
	19	Syarif Nurhidayat Muzhaimey
	20	Mohamad Amin Jamaluddin
	21	Muhammad Danial Noor Hamidi
	22	Muhamad Amirul Aqil Kamsol
	23	Asyraf Norudin
Coach:
(Malaysia) Lee Nyuk Fah

=== Week 6 ===
2 June 2018
16:00 HKT (UTC+8)

Hong Kong	39–5	South Korea
Try: Rosslee 13' c Slatem 24' c, 38' c Yiu 30' c Lauder 75' m Con: Rosslee 14', 25', 31', 39' (4/5); Pen: Rosslee 8', 50'	Report	Try: Lee Yong-seung 54' m

Hong Kong Football Club Stadium, Hong Kong
Referee: Shuhei Kubo (Japan)

FB	15	Robert Keith
RW	14	Salom Yiu Kam Shing
OC	13	Jack Neville
IC	12	Max Woodward
LW	11	Conor Hartley
FH	10	Matthew Rosslee
SH	9	Liam Slatem
N8	8	Thomas Lamboley
OF	7	Toby Fenn
BF	6	Nicholas Hewson
RL	5	Kyle Sullivan
LL	4	James Cunningham (c)
TP	3	Dylan Rogers
HK	2	Ben Roberts
LP	1	Daniel Barlow
Replacements:
	16	Jamie Tsang
	17	Adam Fullgrabe
	18	Jack Parfitt
	19	Michael Parfitt
	20	Kane Boucaut
	21	Cris Pierrepont
	22	Jamie Lauder
	23	Max Denmark
	24	Tyler Spitz
Coach:
(Wales) Leigh Jones

FB	15	Lee Jae-bok
RW	14	Jang Jeong-min
OC	13	Jang Seong-min	(yellow card) 73' to 80'
IC	12	Kim Seongu
LW	11	Kim Nam-uk
FH	10	Oh Youn-hyung
SH	9	Shin Ki-cheol
N8	8	Lee Yong-seung (c)
OF	7	Hwang Injo
BF	6	Cha Sung-kun
RL	5	Lee Jin-seok
LL	4	Jang Seok-hwan
TP	3	Kang Tae-hyeon	(yellow card) 34' to 44'
HK	2	You Ji-hoon
LP	1	Na Kwan-young
Replacements:
	16	Noh Ok-gi
	17	Seok Dong-hee
	18	Park Jong-yeol
	19	Lee Kwang-ho
	20	Kim Jeong-min
	21	Lee Myung-jun
	22	Park Hong-sik
	23	Kim Jinhyeok
Coach:
(South Korea) Choi Chang-ryul
