= 2019 Asia Rugby Championship =

- Date: 18 May – 29 June
- Countries: Hong Kong; Malaysia; South Korea

Final positions
- Champions: Hong Kong (2nd title)

Tournament statistics
- Matches played: 6
- Tries scored: 52 (8.67 per match)
- Top scorer(s): (Hong Kong) Matthew Rosslee (44)
- Most tries: (Hong Kong) Paul Altier (3) (Hong Kong) Conor Hartley (3) (Hong Kong) Callum McCullough (3) (Hong Kong) Jack Neville (3) (Hong Kong) Harry Sayers (3)
- Website: www.asiarugby.com

The 2019 Asia Rugby Championship is the fifth annual rugby union series for the top-level Asia Rugby nations. Hong Kong, South Korea and Malaysia shall compete in the 2019 series. The Asia Rugby Championship in 2019 does not include Japan who is hosting the 2019 Rugby World Cup. Other Asian nations played in the lower division tournaments.

The format of the tri-nations series is a double round-robin where the three teams play each other twice on a home and away basis. The team finishing on top of the standings at the end of the series is declared the winner.

== Teams ==
The teams involved, with their world rankings prior to the 2019 tournament in brackets:

Nation	Home stadium	City
Hong Kong (25)	Hong Kong Football Club Stadium	Hong Kong
South Korea (30)	Incheon Namdong Asiad Rugby Field	Incheon
Malaysia (45)	National Stadium	Kuala Lumpur

== Standings ==
2019 Asia Rugby Championship Champions

Pos	Nation	Games				Points			Bonus points	Total points
Pos	Nation	Played	Won	Lost	Drawn	For	Against	Diff	Bonus points	Total points
1	Hong Kong	4	4	0	0	212	37	+175	4	20
2	South Korea	4	2	2	0	103	141	-38	2	10
3	Malaysia	4	0	4	0	54	191	-137	1	1
Points were awarded to the teams as follows: Win - 4 points Draw - 2 points 4 or more tries - 1 point Loss within 7 points - 1 point Loss greater than 7 points - 0 points

== Fixtures ==
Source: asiarugby.com

=== Week 1 ===
18 May 2019
16:00 KST (UTC+9)

South Korea	52–14	Malaysia
Try: You Ji-hoon 24' m Jang Seong-min 30' c Lee Myung-jun 34' c Lee Jin-seok 47' c Na Kwan-young 61' m Jeong Yeon-sik 72' c Jang Jeong-min 76' c Lee Jae-bok 80+1' c Con: Han Gu-min 31', 35', 48' (3/5); Park Ji-su 73', 77', 80+2' (3/3)	Report	Try: Petrus 20' c Wong 67' c Con: Abdul Rahman 21', 68' (2/2)

Incheon Namdong Asiad Rugby Field, Incheon
Referee: Tim Baker (Hong Kong)

FB	15	Lee Jae-bok
RW	14	Jeong Yeon-sik
OC	13	Kim Jin-hyeok
IC	12	Jang Seong-min
LW	11	Jang Jeong-min
FH	10	Han Gu-min
SH	9	Lee Myung-jun
N8	8	Cha Sung-kyun
OF	7	Kim Dae-hwan
BF	6	You Ji-hoon
RL	5	Yang Dae-yong
LL	4	Lee Jin-seok
TP	3	Lee Gyu-sang
HK	2	Kim Jeep
LP	1	Na Kwan-young (c)
Replacements:
	16	Son Young-gi
	17	Lee Hyun-su
	18	Kang Soon-hyuck
	19	Park Ye-chan
	20	Son Min-su
	21	Chae Min-seong
	22	Park Ji-su
	23	Kim Nam-uk
Coach:
(South Korea) Seo Chun-oh

FB	15	Seru Pepeli Naqasima
RW	14	Wong Wye Wye
OC	13	Mohd Syahir Asraf Rosli
IC	12	Sakiusa Terence Gavidi
LW	11	Badrul Bin Muktee
FH	10	Mohd Fairuz Bin Abdul Rahman
SH	9	Mohamad Khairul Abdillah Bin Ramli
N8	8	Etonia Vaqa Saukuru
OF	7	Samuel Rentap Meran
BF	6	Timoci Vunimoku
RL	5	Dineshvaran Krishnan (c)
LL	4	Muhammad Sameer Bin Muhammad Sani Surinder
TP	3	Lawrence Petrus
HK	2	Amirul Mukminim Amizan
LP	1	Bryan Wilfreddoline
Replacements:
	16	Mohd Nurazman bin Ramli
	17	Mohamad Akmal Yassin Chong
	18	Amirul Aiman Ihsan bin Abas
	19	Muhammad Danial bin Noor Hamidi
	20	Hashraffuddin Basir
	21	Mohd Nur Ikqwan bin Nordin
	22	Muhamad Amirul Aqil Kamsol
	23	Muhammad Hafizin Aiman Bin Halim
Coach:
(New Zealand) Brad Mika

=== Week 2 ===
25 May 2019
21:00 MST (UTC+8)

Malaysia	16–38	South Korea
Try: Mukminin Amizan 30' c Con: Abdul Rahman 32' (1/1); Pen: Abdul Rahman 26', 37', 53'	Report	Try: Cha Sung-kyun 5' m Yang Dae-yong 22' m Na Kwan-young 34' c Shin Hyeon-seong 40' c Kim Nam-uk 58' c Lim Jun-hui 77' c Con: Park Ji-su 35', 40+1' (2/4); Kim Ki-min 59', 78' (2/2)

National Stadium, Kuala Lumpur
Referee: Craig Chan (Hong Kong)

FB	15	Mohd Fairuz Bin Abdul Rahman
RW	14	Wong Wye Wye
OC	13	Mohd Syahir Asraf Rosli
IC	12	Sakiusa Terence Gavidi	(yellow card) 38' to 48'
LW	11	Badrul Bin Muktee
FH	10	Seru Pepeli Naqasima
SH	9	Mohamad Khairul Abdillah Bin Ramli
N8	8	Etonia Vaqa Saukuru
OF	7	Hashraffuddin Basir
BF	6	Timoci Vunimoku
RL	5	Dineshvaran Krishnan (c)
LL	4	Nathaniel Tan Aik-ming	(yellow card) 46' to 56'
TP	3	Amirul Aiman Ihsan bin Abas
HK	2	Amirul Mukminim Amizan
LP	1	Bryan Wilfreddoline
Replacements:
	16	Mohd Nurazman bin Ramli
	17	Lawrence Petrus
	18	Mohamad Akmal Yassin Chong
	19	Muhammad Danial bin Noor Hamidi
	20	Syahmi Afiq Edan
	21	Mohd Nur Ikqwan bin Nordin
	22	Muhamad Amirul Aqil Kamsol
	23	Muhammad Zharif Afendi Mohamed Zahib
Coach:
(New Zealand) Brad Mika

FB	15	Lee Jae-bok
RW	14	Jeong Yeon-sik
OC	13	Lee Yong-un
IC	12	Kim Nam-uk
LW	11	Jang Jeong-min
FH	10	Park Ji-su
SH	9	Chae Min-seong
N8	8	Cha Sung-kyun
OF	7	Son Min-su
BF	6	You Ji-hoon
RL	5	Yang Dae-yong
LL	4	Lee Jin-seok
TP	3	Lee Gyu-sang
HK	2	Kim Jeep
LP	1	Na Kwan-young (c)
Replacements:
	16	Son Young-gi
	17	Lee Hyun-su
	18	Kang Soon-hyuck
	19	Choi Seong-dok
	20	Lim Jun-hui
	21	Kang Min-jun
	22	Kim Ki-min
	23	Shin Hyeon-seong
Coach:
(South Korea) Seo Chun-oh

=== Week 3 ===
8 June 2019
16:00 KST (UTC+9)

South Korea	10–47	Hong Kong
Try: Jeong Yeon-sik 7' c Con: Han Gu-min 9' (1/1); Pen: Han Gu-min 34'	Report	Try: Hartley (3) 20' m, 49' c, 80' m Sayers 53' c Altier 59' c Jans 73' c Con: Rosslee 50', 54', 60', 74' (4/6); Pen: Rosslee 4', 16', 39'

Incheon Namdong Asiad Rugby Field, Incheon
Referee: Tasuku Kawahara (Japan)

FB	15	Lee Jae-bok
RW	14	Jeong Yeon-sik
OC	13	Kim Nam-uk
IC	12	Jang Seong-min
LW	11	Jang Jeong-min
FH	10	Han Gu-min
SH	9	Lee Myung-jun
N8	8	Cha Sung-kyun
OF	7	Kim Yo-han
BF	6	Lim Jun-hui
RL	5	Yang Dae-yong
LL	4	Kim Dae-hwan
TP	3	Lee Gyu-sang
HK	2	Kim Jeep
LP	1	Na Kwan-young (c)
Replacements:
	16	Yeo Jae-min
	17	Lee Hyun-su
	18	Kang Soon-hyuck
	19	Park Ye-chan
	20	Choi Seong-dok
	21	Kang Min-jun
	22	Kim Jin-hyeok
	23	Baeg Jong-eun
Coach:
(South Korea) Seo Chun-oh

FB	15	Paul Altier
RW	14	Harry Sayers
OC	13	Ben Axten-Burrett
IC	12	Matthew Rosslee
LW	11	Conor Hartley
FH	10	Jack Neville
SH	9	Liam Slatem (c)
N8	8	Kane Boucaut
OF	7	Callum McCullough
BF	6	James Cunningham
RL	5	Kyle Sullivan
LL	4	Fin Field
TP	3	Grant Kemp
HK	2	Alexander Post
LP	1	Ben Higgins
Replacements:
	16	Dayne Jans
	17	Dan Barlow
	18	Jack Parfitt
	19	Craig Lodge
	20	Cris Pierrepont
	21	Bryn Phillips
	22	Lewis Warner
	23	Robert Keith
Coach:
(Scotland) Andrew Hall

=== Week 4 ===
15 June 2019
16:00 HKT (UTC+8)

Hong Kong	30–24	Malaysia
Try: Phillips 16' m Purvis 36' c McCullough 57' c Andrews 64' m Con: Altier 38' (1/2); Neville 58' (1/2); Pen: Altier 40+1'; Neville 79'	Report	Try: Saukuru (2) 8' c, 68' c Vunimoku 74' c Con: Abdul Rahman 9', 69', 76' (3/3); Pen: Abdul Rahman 26'

Hong Kong Football Club Stadium, Hong Kong
Referee: Teruhisa Kajiwara (Japan)

FB	15	Robert Keith
RW	14	Sam Purvis
OC	13	Lewis Warner
IC	12	Ben Axten-Burrett
LW	11	Sebastian Brien
FH	10	Paul Altier
SH	9	Bryn Phillips
N8	8	Kane Boucaut
OF	7	Cris Pierrepont
BF	6	Callum McCullough
RL	5	Kyle Sullivan
LL	4	Craig Lodge
TP	3	Jack Parfitt
HK	2	Jamie Tsang (c)
LP	1	Dan Barlow
Replacements:
	16	Mitch Andrews
	17	Callum McFeat-Smith
	18	Keelan Chapman
	19	Sam Tsoi
	20	James Cunningham
	21	Jamie Lauder
	22	Jack Neville
	23	Tyler Spitz
Coach:
(Scotland) Andrew Hall

FB	15	Muhamad Amirul Aqil Kamsol
RW	14	Wong Wye Wye
OC	13	Mohd Syahir Asraf Rosli
IC	12	Sakiusa Terence Gavidi
LW	11	Badrul Bin Muktee
FH	10	Mohd Fairuz Bin Abdul Rahman
SH	9	Mohamad Khairul Abdillah Bin Ramli
N8	8	Etonia Vaqa Saukuru
OF	7	Samuel Rentap Meran
BF	6	Muhammad Danial bin Noor Hamidi
RL	5	Dineshvaran Krishnan (c)
LL	4	Muhammad Sameer Bin Muhammad Sani Surinder
TP	3	Mohamad Akmal Yassin Chong
HK	2	Amirul Mukminim Amizan
LP	1	Bryan Wilfreddoline	(yellow card) 47' to 57'
Replacements:
	16	Mohd Nurazman bin Ramli
	17	Syahmi Afiq Edan
	18	Lawrence Petrus
	19	Timoci Vunimoku
	20	Nathaniel Tan Aik-ming
	21	Mohd Nur Ikqwan bin Nordin
	22	Muhammad Hafizin Aiman Bin Halim
	23	Naivaluoni Raturibi
Coach:
(New Zealand) Brad Mika

=== Week 5 ===
22 June 2019
20:00 MST (UTC+8)

Malaysia	0–71	Hong Kong
	Report	Try: Penalty try 6'; Sayers (2) 18' c, 65' m Spitz 24' m Post 34' c Altier (2) 38' c, 51' c Slatem 43' m Boucaut 57' c Neville 69' c Warner 72' c Con: Rosslee 19', 35', 39', 52', 58', 70', 73' (7/10)

National Stadium, Kuala Lumpur
Referee: Tasuku Kawahara (Japan)

FB	15	Muhamad Amirul Aqil Kamsol
RW	14	Wong Wye Wye (c)
OC	13	Seru Pepeli Naqasima
IC	12	Sakiusa Terence Gavidi
LW	11	Badrul Bin Muktee
FH	10	Mohd Fairuz Bin Abdul Rahman
SH	9	Mohd Nur Ikqwan bin Nordin
N8	8	Etonia Vaqa Saukuru
OF	7	Samuel Rentap Meran
BF	6	Hashraffuddin Basir
RL	5	Muhammad Danial bin Noor Hamidi
LL	4	Timoci Vunimoku
TP	3	Mohamad Akmal Yassin Chong
HK	2	Amirul Mukminim Amizan	(yellow card) 16' to 26'
LP	1	Bryan Wilfreddoline
Replacements:
	16	Mohd Nurazman bin Ramli
	17	Amirul Aiman Ihsan bin Abas
	18	Lawrence Petrus
	19	Nathaniel Tan Aik-ming
	20	Naivaluoni Raturibi
	21	Mohamad Khairul Abdillah Bin Ramli
	22	Mohd Syahir Asraf Rosli
	23	Mohamad Faris bin Pead
Coach:
(New Zealand) Brad Mika

FB	15	Paul Altier
RW	14	Harry Sayers
OC	13	Tyler Spitz
IC	12	Matthew Rosslee
LW	11	Conor Hartley
FH	10	Jack Neville
SH	9	Liam Slatem (c)
N8	8	Kane Boucaut
OF	7	Callum McCullough
BF	6	James Cunningham
RL	5	Kyle Sullivan
LL	4	Fin Field
TP	3	Grant Kemp
HK	2	Alexander Post
LP	1	Ben Higgins
Replacements:
	16	Mitch Andrews
	17	Dan Barlow
	18	Faizal Solomona Penesa
	19	Sam Tsoi
	20	Cris Pierrepont
	21	Jamie Lauder
	22	Ben Axten-Burrett
	23	Lewis Warner
Coach:
(Scotland) Andrew Hall

=== Week 6 ===
29 June 2019
16:00 HKT (UTC+8)

Hong Kong	64–3	South Korea
Try: Neville (2) 10' m, 21' c Brien 12' c Axten-Burrett (2) 15' c, 70' c Spitz 38' m Rosslee 44' c McCullough (2) 58' c, 72' c Solomona Penesa 61' c Con: Rosslee 14', 16', 22', 45' (4/7); Neville 62', 71', 73' (3/3)	Report	Pen: Han Gu-min 25'

Hong Kong Football Club Stadium, Hong Kong
Referee: Shuhei Kubo (Japan)

FB	15	Jack Neville
RW	14	Sebastian Brien
OC	13	Tyler Spitz
IC	12	Ben Axten-Burrett
LW	11	Harry Sayers
FH	10	Matthew Rosslee
SH	9	Liam Slatem (c)
N8	8	Kane Boucaut
OF	7	Callum McCullough
BF	6	James Cunningham
RL	5	Kyle Sullivan
LL	4	Fin Field
TP	3	Grant Kemp
HK	2	Alexander Post
LP	1	Ben Higgins
Replacements:
	16	Callum McFeat-Smith
	17	Mitch Andrews
	18	Faizal Solomona Penesa
	19	Craig Lodge
	20	Sam Tsoi
	21	Jamie Lauder
	22	Lewis Warner
	23	Robert Keith
Coach:
(Scotland) Andrew Hall

FB	15	Lee Jae-bok
RW	14	Kim Nam-uk
OC	13	Kim Jin-hyeok
IC	12	Jang Seong-min
LW	11	Hong Sung-jong
FH	10	Han Gu-min
SH	9	Lee Myung-jun
N8	8	Cha Sung-kyun (c)
OF	7	Kim Yo-han
BF	6	Choi Seong-deok
RL	5	Park Ye-chan
LL	4	Kim Do-kun
TP	3	Lee Gyu-sang
HK	2	Kim Jeep
LP	1	Lee Hyun-su	(red card) 27'
Replacements:
	16	Yeo Jae-min
	17	Shin Ji-min
	18	Kang Soon-hyuck
	19	Park Joo-young
	20	Noh Ok-gi
	21	Kang Min-jun
	22	Kim Ki-min
	23	Shin Hyeon-seong
Coach:
(South Korea) Seo Chun-oh
