= USRC =

USRC may refer to:

- United Services Recreation Club, Hong Kong, a social and sports club
  - USRC Tigers RFC, a rugby union club
- Union Station Rail Corridor, the former Toronto Terminals Railway trackage
- United States Revenue Cutter Service
