= 2017 Cup of Nations (rugby union) =

Hong Kong rugby tournament

- Countries: Chile; Hong Kong; Kenya; Russia
- Date: 10–18 November 2017
- Champions: Russia (3rd title)
- Runners-up: Hong Kong
- Matches played: 6

The 2017 Cup of Nations was the fifth Cup of Nations rugby union tournament since its creation in 2011. The tournament returned to Hong Kong, reprising its name as the Hong Kong Cup of Nations. The tournament acted as a year-ending tournament for "up and coming" tier 3 teams from different continents, providing greater preparation for teams to play in their regional competitions, especially with the 2017 participants aiming to qualify for the 2019 Rugby World Cup or to make the Rugby World Cup global repechage in November 2018.

The four competing teams were the hosts Hong Kong, two-time defending champions Russia, Chile and Kenya.

== Format ==
The tournament was played as a single round-robin, with the winner being the team with the most table points after the third round of fixtures.

== Standings ==
Place	Nation	Games				Points			Bonus points	Table points
Place	Nation	Played	Won	Drawn	Lost	For	Against	Difference	Bonus points	Table points
1	Russia	3	3	0	0	89	34	+55	2	14
2	Hong Kong	3	2	0	1	66	52	+14	2	10
3	Chile	3	1	0	2	40	58	-18	1	5
4	Kenya	3	0	0	3	43	94	-51	1	1

== Fixtures ==
=== Round 1 ===
10 November 2017
17:00

Kenya	3–23	Chile
Pen: Mukidza 27'	Report	Try: Ianiszewski 56' c Soto 67' c Con: Ianiszewski 58', 68'; Pen: Ianiszewski 18', 31', 38'

King's Park Sports Ground

10 November 2017
19:00

Hong Kong	13–16	Russia
Try: Yiu Kam Shing 67' c Con: Rosslee 68'; Pen: Rosslee 10', 53'	Report	Try: Selskii 38' c Con: Gaisin 39'; Pen: Gaisin 2', 31', 80'

King's Park Sports Ground

=== Round 2 ===
14 November 2017
17:00

Russia	31–10	Kenya
Try: Davydov 28' c Nepeyvoda 32' m, 38' c Sychev 48' c Ryabov 60' m Con: Gaisin 29', 39', 49'	Report	Try: Simiyu 50' c Con: Mukidza 51'; Pen: Mukidza 8'

King's Park Sports Ground

14 November 2017
19:00

Hong Kong	13–6	Chile
Try: Lamming 39' c Con: Neville 40'; Pen: Neville 47', Rosslee 69'	Report	Pen: Ianiszewski 44', 60'

King's Park Sports Ground

=== Round 3 ===
18 November 2017
14:00

Russia	42–11	Chile
Try: Fedotko 9' c Temnov 17' c, 22' c Dorofeev 32' c Davydov 39' c Sozonov 68' c Con: Gaisin 11', 18', 23', 33', 40', 69'	Report	Try: Saavedra 12' m Pen: Ianiszewski 6', 20'

Hong Kong Football Club Stadium

18 November 2017
17:00

Hong Kong	40–30	Kenya
Try: Hartley 4' m, 64' c Fenn 7' c Rauca 21' c Yiu Kam Shing 54' m Con: Rosslee 8', 22', 65'; Pen: Rosslee 12', 70', 77'	Report	Try: Ikambili 31' c Onsomu 51' c Mose 60' m Mangeni Kizito 66' m Con: Mukidza 32', 52'; Pen: Mukidza 15', 20'

Hong Kong Football Club Stadium

== See also ==
- 2017 end-of-year rugby union internationals
