= Wylie Road =

Road in Ho Man Tin, Hong Kong

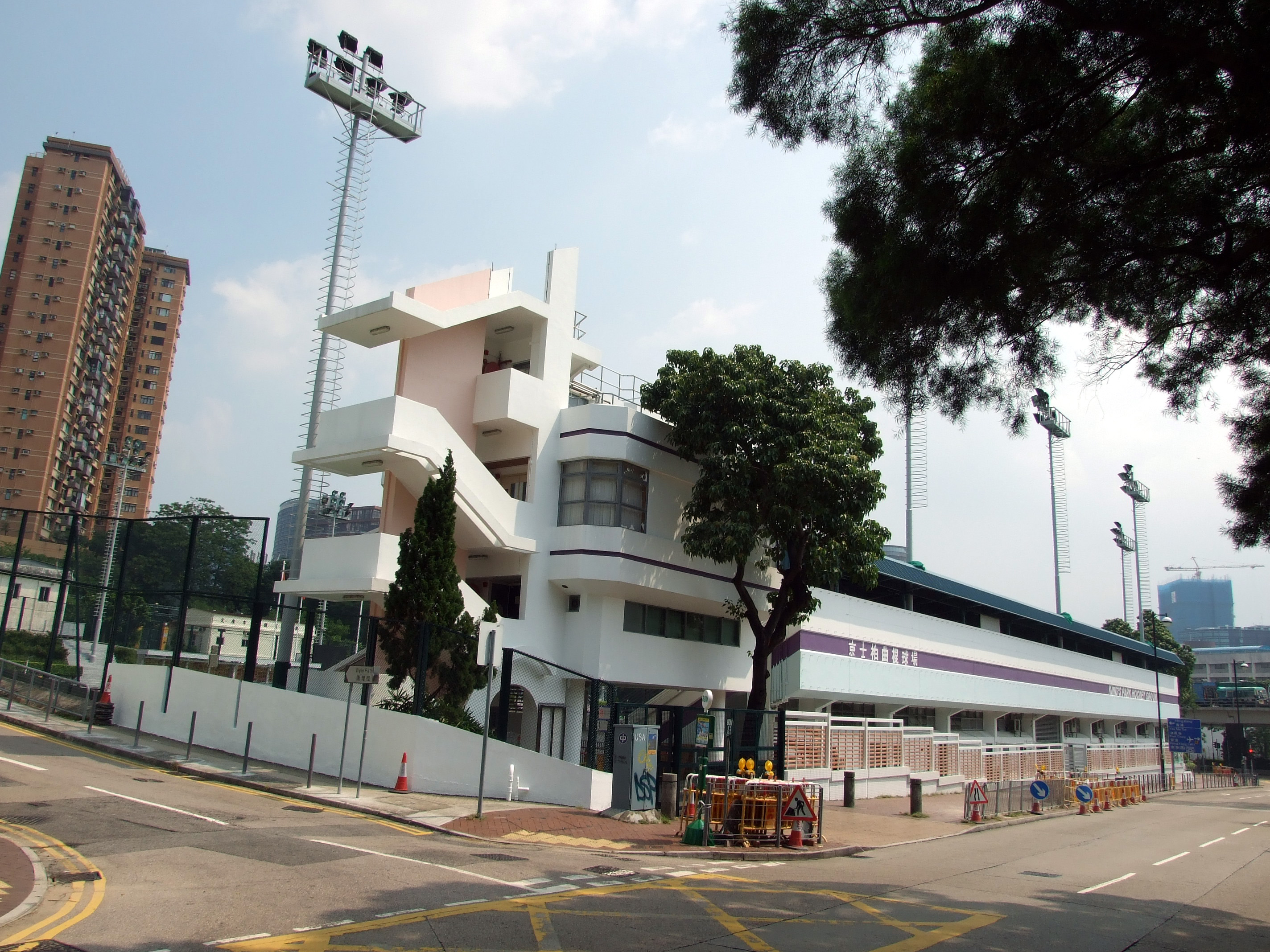
King's Park Hockey Ground on Wylie Road

Wylie Road (Chinese: 衛理道 or 衞理道) is a road in Ho Man Tin and King's Park, Kowloon, Hong Kong. It runs south–north from Gascoigne Road to Waterloo Road and was named after the British missionary Alexander Wylie.

== Notable places ==
- British Military Hospital
- King's Park Hockey Ground
- Tung Wah College
- Parc Palais

== See also ==
- List of streets and roads in Kowloon
