= USRC Tigers RFC =

Hong Kong rugby union club

(Hong Kong) KROLL USRC Tigers RFC 三軍會猛虎欖球會
- Full name: USRC Tigers Rugby Football Club
- Founded: 1970s as Kai Tak Mini RFC
- Location: King's Park, Kowloon
- Ground(s): King's Park Sports Ground, 3,000 capacity. Registered members = 900
- Chairman: Markus Naumann
- Director of Rugby: Nigel Hotham
- Captain: Jamie Williams
- League(s): HKRFU Premiership, Hong Kong Mini-Rugby Football Union, Colts-Rugby Club League
1st kit	2nd kit

Official website
- www.usrctigers.com

USRC Tigers (三軍會猛虎欖球會) is a rugby union club based in King's Park, Hong Kong. It arose from the merger between Kai Tak Tigers and DeA Flamingo Rugby Football Club in 1990 to become "DeA Tigers". In 2014, DeA Tigers associated with the United Services Recreation Club (USRC) to become "USRC Tigers". Since the 2024/25 seasons the Men’s and Women’s Premiership sides are coached by former Hamilton Boys head coach Nigel Hotham and Ulster Rugby star Conor Joyce, respectively.

== History ==
Kai Tak Mini Rugby Club, a precursor to the present-day club, was created in the late 1970s to cater for mini rugby. It derived its name from its location at the sports ground at Kai Tak. However, as the Kai Tak Airport expanded, the club was relocated first to Blackdown Barracks where the British military were stationed, and then successively to Shek Kip Mei and finally King's Park, where it shared the grounds with 'Tigers Rugby Club' of the British Armed Forces. After the British departed in 1997, Kai Tak Minis adopted the word 'Tigers' into their name and became the Kai Tak Tigers Mini Rugby Club until the merger with DeA.

The 'seniors' part of the club was formed in 1988 to pursue a Rugby Development Programme under the auspices of the Duke of Edinburgh Award Scheme, and was thus named 'DeA'. This group of local male and female P.E. teachers joined with the scheme participants to enter the first ever touch rugby training and tournament. In 1990, 'DeA Flamingo Rugby Football Club' was created to cater for older rugby players in need of a senior club. Over time, the 'Flamingo' in the name was dropped.

In September 2002, upon its merger with Kai Tak, creating only the second club to cater for rugby at all levels, the club henceforth become 'DeA Tigers Rugby Football Club'. At the club's general meeting in 2014, members approved an association with the United Services Recreation Club (USRC) and a name change to USRC Tigers RFC, and as of 2021 season KROLL USRC Tigers.

=== Grounds ===
Tigers' "home ground" at King's Park is shared with other members of the King's Park Sports Association – sporting clubs that play a range of sports such as football, baseball. The actual tenant is the Hong Kong Rugby Football Union, which signed the underlying seven-year lease with the Hong Kong Government for the grounds, and invested in laying artificial turf on all pitches and installing floodlighting.

=== Notable players ===
- Rowan Varty – Hong Kong international, former Toyota Shokki Shuttles player, also the first Hong Kong player to represent the Barbarians.
- (New Zealand) Mark Reddish – Wellington Rugby Football Union and Hurricanes (rugby union) player.
- (New Zealand) Adam Hill – Wellington Rugby Football Union and Hurricanes (rugby union) player.
- (Fiji) Senirusi Seruvakula – Naitasiri Rugby Club, Fijian rugby union player
- (Fiji) Kiniviliame Radaveta – Hydro Rugby Club and Fijian rugby union player.
- (New Zealand) Dane Maraki – Manly RUFC player.
- Ivan Zenovic – Hong Kong international.
- (Republic of Ireland) Charles Armstrong – Ireland U18 international, former Nottingham R.F.C. player.
- (England) Marc Siddons – former Lazio Roma Rugby player.
- (England) Donald Blake – former Nottingham R.F.C. player.
- (England) Sam Wood – former Nottingham R.F.C. player.
- (England) Robert Cleary – former Nottingham R.F.C. and Northampton Old Scouts RFC player.

Braam Gerber (RSA) Blue Bulls

== Membership ==
Tigers currently have about 1,000 playing members in the minis, youth, senior and social sections. Membership of the mini/youth rugby club is relatively open, and is achieved through the players themselves; registration takes place at the start of each season in late August/early September. Costs are kept to a minimum by parents' active involvement in the running of the club, such as taking on the role as coaches or in other capacities, and/or join the Section or General Committees that administer the club.

== Seasons ==
USRC Tigers have a semi-professional Men’s and Women’s team in the HKRFU Premiership, the highest league in Hong Kong rugby. Furthermore USRC Tigers field teams adult, development and social teams in Prem A and several lower leagues.

Youth are playing their games in the Youth Premiership while Minis have several inter-club festivals throughout the season.

== Club structure ==
The club is divided into three main sporting divisions: Senior, Youth, and Mini; each division has its own committee, and sections for girls/women's rugby. The club is run by a General Committee consisting of six Elected Members and three ex officio members, who are the chairmen of each of the Seniors Colts and Minis, and a number of co-opted members. It also has activities on a social level for adults.

poster publicising the Rugby Grand Championships in 2011

The DeA 1st, 2nd and 3rd XV all reached the finals in 2010/2011 season.

=== Youth-rugby section ===
The Colts are youth section, for children aged between 12 and 18. Tigers Youth rugby is the largest and most successful Youth rugby section of any club in Hong Kong having won many successive U19 championship titles.

=== Mini-rugby section ===
The Minis cater for children from the age of 4 up to the age of 11. Minis play touch rugby from 4 years onwards while full contact tackling is gradually introduced for kids aged 8 years. The Tiger Minis usually train on Sunday mornings at their home ground at Kings Park. Every November they are hosting Tigerfest, one of the largest mini rugby festivals in the world, often with over 3,500 participating players.

=== Vice presidents ===
There is a further unofficial section consisting of distinguished former players, club officials, coaches and supporters called The Grey Commandos.

== Affiliations ==
As of August 2014, Tigers RFC is associated with the United Services Recreation Club. In the 2017-18 season, USRC Tigers came top of the league with 39 points.
