= British Military Hospital, Hong Kong =

British Military Hospital
- British garrison, British Army
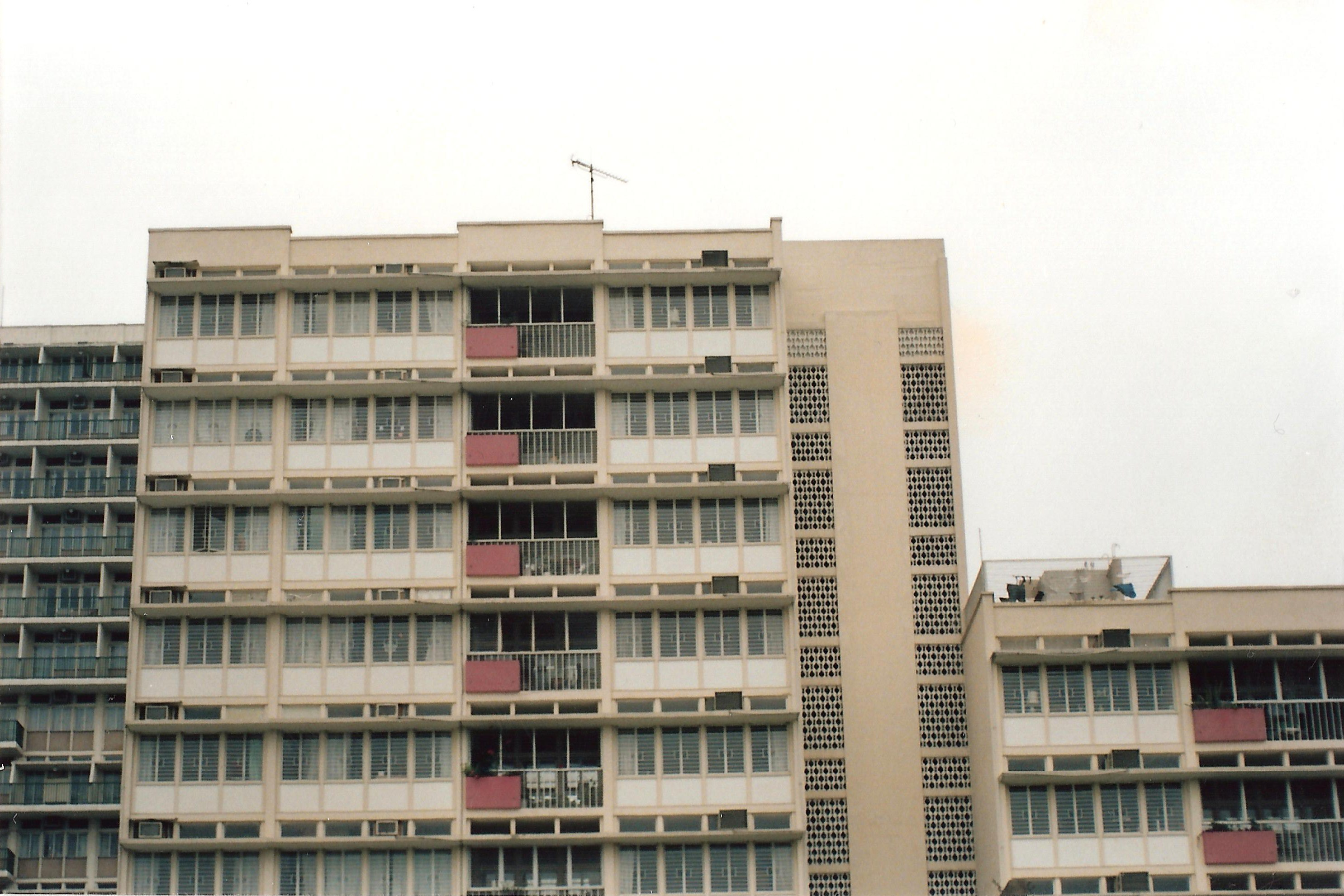
- Millbank House, British Military Hospital, Kowloon, Hong Kong, c. 1994

- Location within Hong Kong

Geography
- Location: Wylie Road, King's Park, Hong Kong
- Coordinates: 22°18′38″N 114°10′35″E

Organisation
- Type: Military

History
- Founded: July 1, 1907
- Closed: June 30, 1996

Links
- Lists: Hospitals in Hong Kong

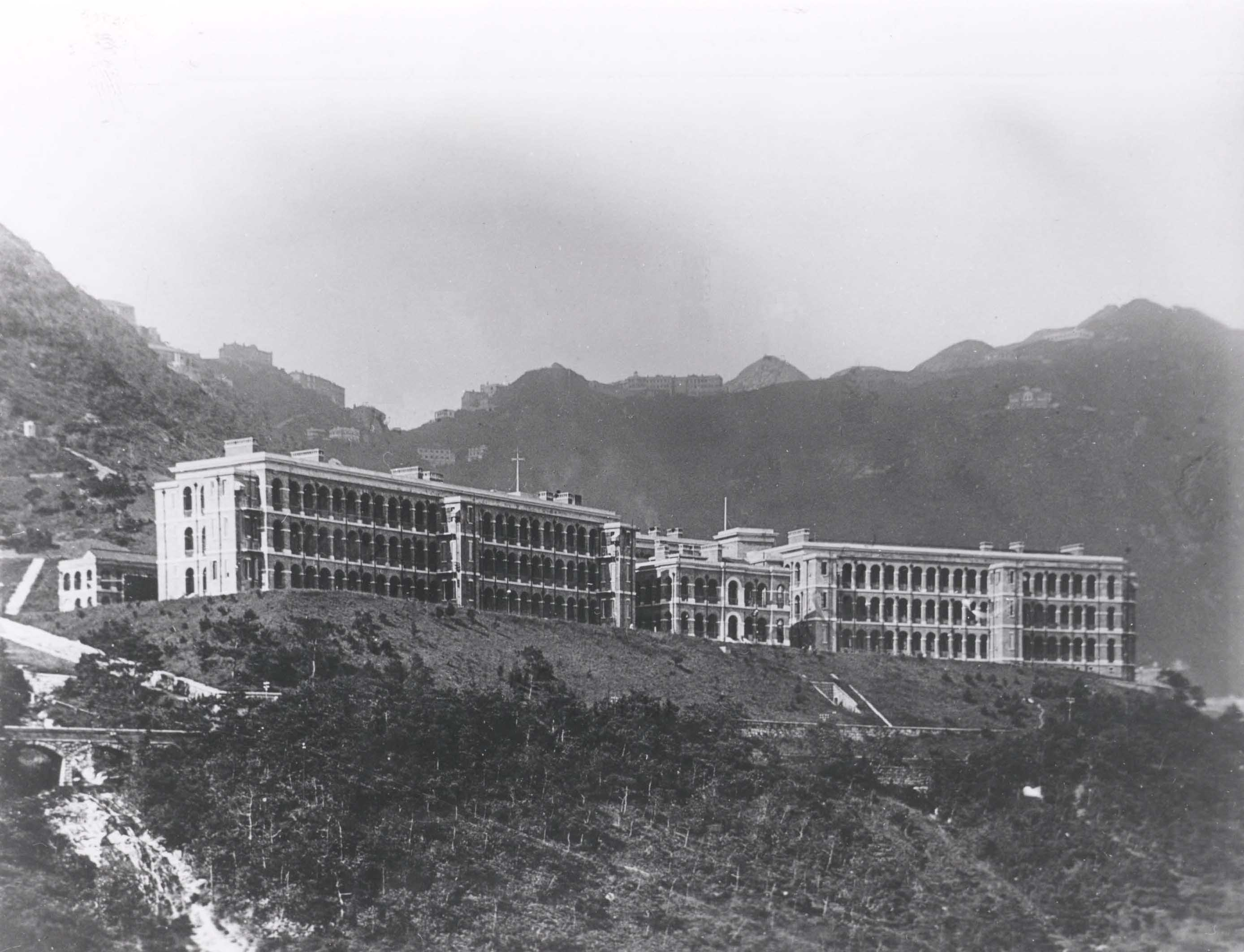
The Bowen Road Hospital, c. 1925

The British Military Hospital was a military hospital in Hong Kong for the use of the British garrison. It was located at 10–12 Borrett Road from 1907 to 1967, and in King's Park from 1967 to its closure in 1997. It was built between 1903 and 1906, and officially opened on 1 July 1907.

Often referred to simply as the Bowen Road Hospital, the first generation hospital was a 150-bed hospital constructed of red brick. It consisted of two blocks, each of three storeys, configured with wards and a central administrative block. It had commanding views of Victoria Harbour.

During the Japanese occupation, a portion of the hospital was used for the care of prisoners of war. It continued in use until 1967, when it was turned over to the colonial government. The facility was moved to a site in Kowloon.

== Bowen Road ==
=== Post de-commissioning ===
Between 1967 and 1972, it became the temporary location for the new Island School, which had obtained a five-year lease from the Government. It was also home to the German Swiss International School from 1973 until 1975, when the current GSIS building opened in Guildford Road. The east wing is now home to the (Jewish International) Carmel School, and the Canadian International School occupied the west wing of the building from 1994 to 1999, after which it moved to new premises in Aberdeen.

Former hospital buildings on the adjacent site on Borrett Road, vacated in 1969, were used by the Chinese International School during the 1980s. The 10 Borrett Road site became the first home to the West Island School, from 1991 to 1994.

In the 1986 Mid-Levels plan, the site was zoned to become open space. In May 2001, the Town Planning Board re-zoned it to "government, community and institutional use" on the recommendation of the Planning Department and the Antiquities and Monuments Office, allowing the buildings to be preserved. The Main Block and the Annex Block of the Old British Military Hospital are Grade I historic buildings since 2009.

Current occupants of the building include:

- Carmel School
- Chung Ying Theatre Company
- Small World Christian Kindergarten
- Watchdog Early Education Centre
- City Kids

== King's Park ==
In 1967, a new 15-storey British Military Hospital was opened on Wylie Road in the King's Park area, on a site to the east of the Queen Elizabeth Hospital. It replaced the Bowen Road campus. It provided medical treatment for servicemen, their dependants, and returning soldiers from Vietnam. Millbank House, Worcester Heights and Canterbury Court were also home to the Officers Mess and Other Ranks Mess, as well as accommodation for servicemen's families in three blocks.

When the British armed forces suffered a 15% reduction between 1975 and 1978, the Government proposed to use the hospital as an overspill for the Queen Elizabeth Hospital, which was in undercapacity. It would buy bedspace and treatment from the hospital, but the high cost was criticised as unreasonable and lacking in transparency.

Within the Joint Liaison Group, there was a consensus to demolish it. It was officially closed on 30 June 1996 as the British Garrison scaled down from more than 10,000 personnel to about 3,000 due to the approach of 1997.

=== Post de-commissioning ===
Between 1996 and 1999, the hospital was turned over to the Philippine Consulate-General as a refuge for dismissed domestic workers, for a token lease of HK$1.

The 7.4 hectares (18 acres) site had an estimated market value of HK$5.6 billion in 1995. The site is now a private housing estate, Parc Palais.
