= Mathew Turner =

South African rugby union player (born 1988)

Mat Turner
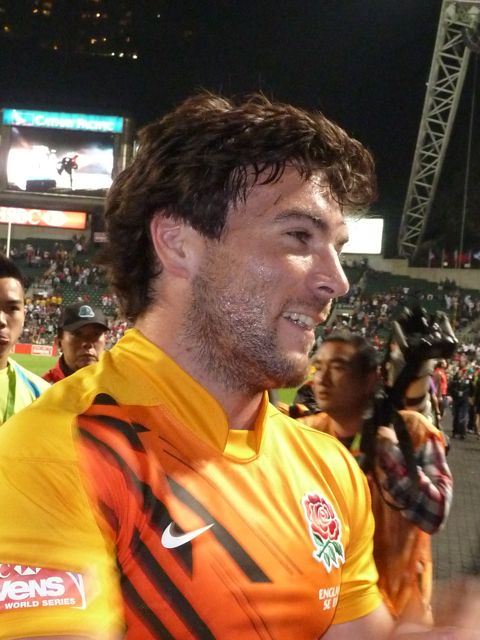
- Full name: Mathew Drew Turner
- Born: 18 January 1988 (age 38) Cape Town, South Africa
- Height: 1.75 m (5 ft 9 in)
- Weight: 86 kg (190 lb; 13 st 8 lb)
- School: Bishops College, Cape Town
- University: University of Cape Town
- Notable relative: Gina Rose Turner (wife)

Rugby union career
- Position: Wing / Fullback
- Current team: Western Province
Youth career
- 2007–2008: Western Province
Amateur team(s)
Years	Team	Apps	(Points)
2008	UCT Ikey Tigers	8	(52)
Senior career
Years	Team	Apps	(Points)
2008–2010	Bristol	11	(20)
2015	Western Province	4	(0)
2018–present	Seattle Seawolves	0	(0)
- Correct as of 31 May 2015
International career
Years	Team	Apps	(Points)
2009	Southern Kings	1	(0)
2008–2013	England Sevens	34	(460)
- Correct as of 1 April 2015

Mathew Drew Turner ("Mat" for short) (born 18 January 1988) is a South African born rugby union player who currently plays for the Seattle Seawolves in Major League Rugby (MLR).

He also played rugby sevens for England on the Sevens World Series circuit between 2008 and 2013. He usually plays as a wing or fullback.

Turner played for UCT Ikey Tigers in the inaugural Varsity Cup season before joining the England sevens tour. He also played 15s rugby for English Premiership side Bristol between 2008 and 2010, for the Southern Kings in their match against the British & Irish Lions in 2009, and for Western Province in 2015.

== Career ==
=== Youth / Varsity Cup ===
Turner was born in Cape Town, South Africa. He attended Western Province Preparatory School in Claremont and then Bishops College. He was a member of the 2006 Bishops first XV which also included Nick Köster and Martin Muller; he finished as the top scorer in school rugby the country during 2006, scoring 286 points in 20 matches, which included 28 tries. He was overlooked for provincial selection, however, not being included in Western Province's squad for the 2006 Craven Week competition.

After finishing high school, he joined the Western Province Academy and represented the Western Province U19 side during the 2007 Under-19 Provincial Championship.

In 2008, he was included in the UCT Ikey Tigers team that played in the inaugural edition of the Varsity Cup competition. He made an immediate impact for the side, scoring two late tries after coming on as a replacement in the first ever match in the competition, a 17–23 defeat to NWU Pukke. He started all of their remaining seven matches in the competition, scoring a total of nine tries to finish as the top try scorer in the competition. His try-scoring feat also included a hat-trick against TUT Vikings and he contributed a further seven points with the boot to finish sixth in the overall points scoring charts.

He was also selected in a South African Under-20 training squad at the start of 2008, but eventually failed to make the final squad that participated at the 2008 IRB Junior World Championship in Wales.

In the latter half of 2008, he was a member of the Western Province U21 squad that played in the 2008 Under-21 Provincial Championship.

=== Bristol ===
Towards the end of 2008, Turner moved to England to join Premiership side Bristol. He made his first class debut for the side in the 2008–09 Anglo-Welsh Cup. He started on the left wing in their first round match against the Northampton Saints and took just three minutes to score his first try for the club. He also scored a second midway through the first half, but could not prevent Bristol falling to a 17–30 defeat. He also played in their other two matches in the competition, but ended on the losing side on all three occasions.

He also made his debut in the English Premiership against Northampton Saints, coming on as a second-half substitute to help Bristol achieve their first Premiership win, beating Northampton 14–13. He also played in matches against Saracens and Wasps in the same competition. He made a further five appearances for the side following their relegation to the 2009–10 RFU Championship and scored two tries, taking his total number of appearances for the side to eleven.

=== Southern Kings ===
He made an appearance for the newly formed South African Super Rugby franchise, the Port Elizabeth-based Southern Kings, in their first ever match on 16 June 2009 against the British & Irish Lions during their 2009 tour to South Africa, with the Kings losing the match 8–20.

=== England Sevens ===
Turner qualified to play internationally for England through an English mother and was selected for the England sevens team for the first two legs of the 2009–10 IRB Sevens World Series. He immediately established himself as a regular in the England setup and eventually went on to play a total of 34 Sevens World Series tournaments between 2009 and 2013, scoring 92 tries.

In 2012, Turner was nominated for the IRB Sevens Player of the Year award. He made the final shortlist of three with New Zealanders Tomasi Cama and Frank Halai. Cama won the award.

=== Western Province ===
Turner returned to South Africa in 2015 and joined the Stormers for pre-season training prior to the 2015 Super Rugby season. He wasn't included in their final squad for the competition, instead representing Western Province in the 2015 Vodacom Cup. He made his first appearance in a first class domestic competition in South Africa in their opening match against the Boland Cavaliers, contributing to a 25–10 victory against their Western Cape rivals.

=== Seattle Seawolves ===
In 2018, Turner played for the Seattle Seawolves in the first Major League Rugby season, and was awarded the Virginia Mason Alpha Back of the final championship match where the Seattle Seawolves won the championship and taking home the MLR shield.

== Sri Lanka ==
In 2013/14 Turner played for the Central Kings in Sri Lanka at the Carlton International 7s tournament.

== Coaching ==
In August 2015 he was appointed as the head coach of the Sri Lanka national rugby sevens team.
