= Jaco Snyman =

South African rugby union player

- Full name: Jacobus Phillipus Snyman
- Born: 9 June 1986 (age 40) Schweizer-Reneke, South Africa
- Height: 1.76 m (5 ft 9 1/2 in)
- Weight: 85 kg (13 st 5 lb; 187 lb)
- School: Hoërskool Schweizer-Reneke
- University: University of Johannesburg

Rugby union career
- Position: Scrum-half
Youth career
- 2006–2007: Golden Lions
Amateur team(s)
| Years | Team | Apps | (Points) |
| 2008–2010 | UJ | 18 | (30) |
Senior career
| Years | Team | Apps | (Points) |
| 2007–2008 | Golden Lions | 4 | (0) |
| 2009–2015 | Falcons | 66 | (45) |
- Correct as of 23 March 2016

Jacobus Phillipus Snyman (born 9 June 1986) is a South African professional rugby union player, who most recently played with the Falcons. His regular position is scrum-half.

== Career ==
=== Youth and Varsity Cup rugby ===
He played rugby at youth level for the Golden Lions, representing them in the Under-21 Provincial Championships in 2006 and 2007. He also played rugby for university side UJ – he was their first-choice scrum-half during the first three editions of the Varsity Cup competition in 2008, 2009 and 2010, scoring six tries in eighteen starts.

=== Golden Lions ===
He made his first class debut for the Golden Lions during the 2007 Vodacom Cup competition, playing off the bench in their match against the Griffons in Welkom. One more substitute appearance followed against Griquas, plus two more during the 2008 Vodacom Cup against the Boland Cavaliers and the Blue Bulls.

However, he failed to start any matches for the Johannesburg-based side and didn't make the breakthrough to their Currie Cup side.

=== Falcons ===
In 2009, Snyman joined the Golden Lions' near-neighbours, the Falcons, where he established himself as their starting scrum-half over the next few seasons. During the 2009 Currie Cup First Division season, he made his first ever first class start – as well as his Currie Cup debut – in their match against the Mighty Elephants. He also played in their match against the SWD Eagles the following weekend.

He got more game-time in the 2010 Currie Cup First Division, starting eight of their matches and scoring his first of three tries during that competition against the Griffons.

He made fifteen appearances for the Falcons in the 2011 Vodacom Cup and 2011 Currie Cup First Division competitions – which included a match against the Border Bulldogs in which Snyman scored a brace of tries – and a further thirteen in the same competitions in 2012. He played a further six times during the 2013 Currie Cup First Division and reached his half-century of first class appearances during the 2014 Vodacom Cup series.
