= ELCHK Lutheran Secondary School =

Secondary school in Hong Kong

- 基督教香港信義會信義中學
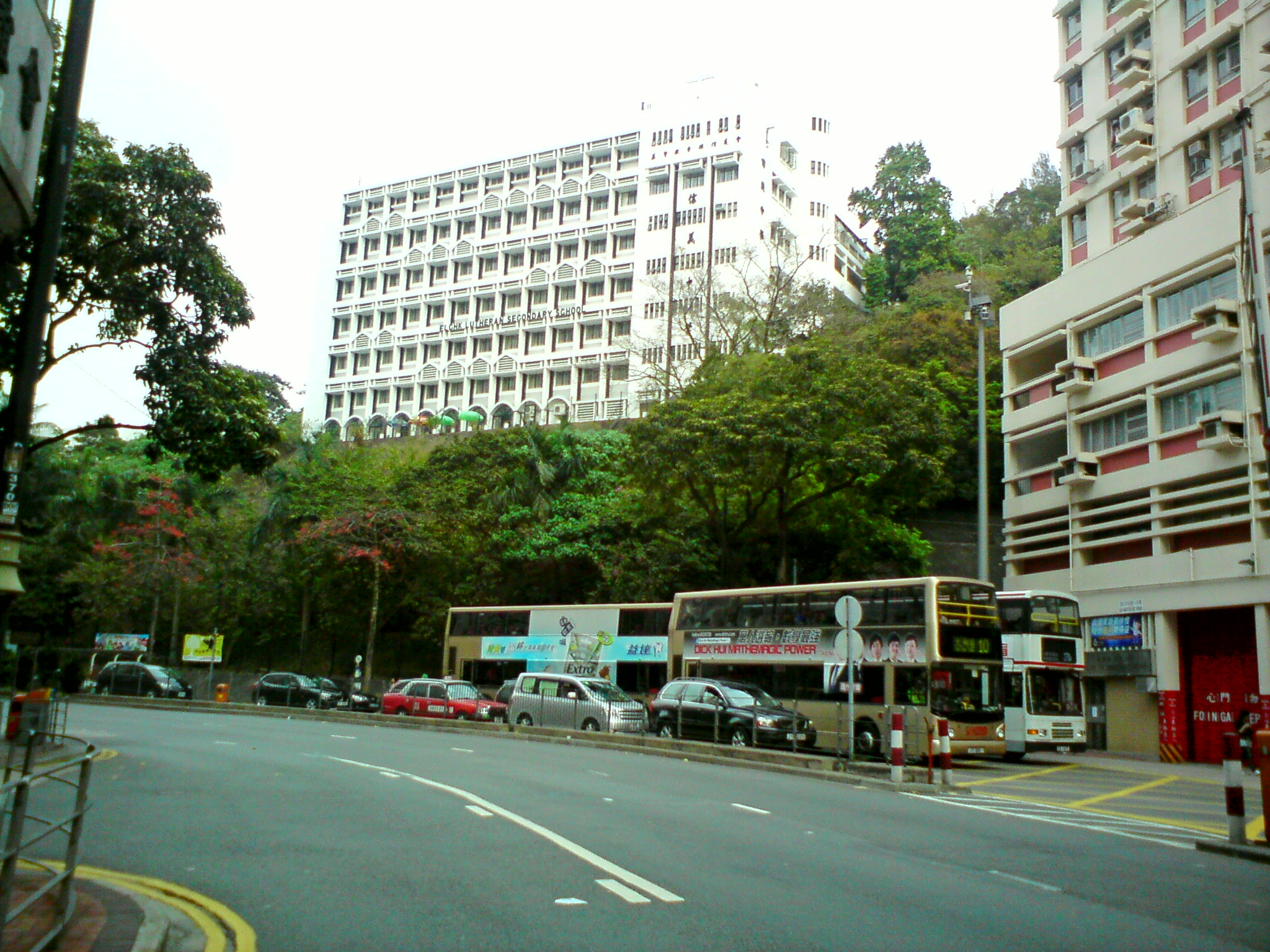
- The school viewed from Waterloo Road

Location
- 52 Waterloo Road, Yau Ma Tei, Yau Tsim Mong District, Kowloon, Hong Kong
- Coordinates: 22.31319°N 114.17211°E

Information
- Type: Subsidized
- Motto: 正心修身 (Rectify Mind Cultivate Person)
- Religious affiliation: Lutheran
- Established: 1958
- Trust: Evangelical Lutheran Church of Hong Kong
- Principal: Liang Kwun Fan
- Staff: 64
- Enrollment: 761 (as of 2022)
- Language: Chinese, English
- Houses: Faith, Hope, Love, Loyalty
- Publication: 信義校訊
- Website: https://www.lss.edu.hk

ELCHK Lutheran Secondary School
- Traditional Chinese: 基督教香港信義會信義中學
- Simplified Chinese: 基督教香港信义会信义中学
Transcriptions
Standard Mandarin
- Hanyu Pinyin: Jīdūjiào Xiānggǎng Xìnyì Huì Xìnyì Zhōngxué
Yue: Cantonese
- Jyutping: gei1 duk1 gaau3 hoeng1 gong2 seon3 ji6 wui6 seon3 ji6 zung1 hok6

ELCHK Lutheran Secondary School (LSS) (Chinese: 基督教香港信義會信義中學) is a Lutheran aided mixed-sex secondary school in King's Park, Yau Tsim Mong District, Hong Kong established in 1958. The school moved to its current location in 1964, near Yau Ma Tei station.

== History ==
The school was founded by the Evangelical Lutheran Church of Hong Kong in April 1958 and initially borrowed 28B Grampian Road, Kowloon City, to operate, adopting a half-day timetable. 2 years later, as the church that owned the address stopped renting it out to the school, they moved to a vacated campus at 23 Ho Man Tin Hill Road. In 1959, the school was approved to build a new campus at 52 Waterloo Road, which remains their address. They also opened a branch campus in Yuen Long, now ELCHK Yuen Long Lutheran Secondary School. As the permanent campus was completed in 1964, the school officially moved into it.

In its early days, the school had both Chinese and English classes and switched to using English as the sole medium of instruction from 1981 to 1998. In recent years, the school has used both Chinese and English as mediums of instruction.

== Campus ==
The school has a non-standard campus, covering 13,000 square meters with 29 classrooms and various special-use rooms. Completed in 1964 and having undergone expansion in 1997, the architecture exemplifies the Bauhaus style.

== Notable alumni ==
- Jacob Cheung: film director, producer, screenwriter and actor
- Cheung Man-kwong (Form 5 in 1972): politician, former Legislative Councillor
- Stephen Chow (only attended Form 1): filmmaker, actor and comedian
- Edmond Leung (Form 5 in 1990): singer-songwriter, record producer, actor and television host

== See also ==
- Evangelical Lutheran Church of Hong Kong
