= Torsten van Jaarsveld =

Namibia international rugby union player

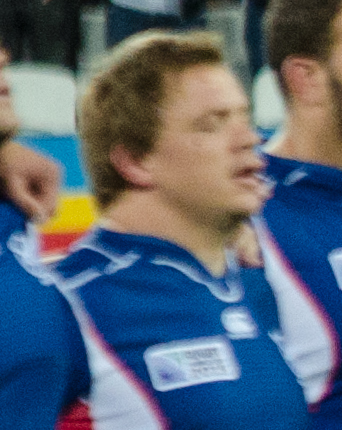
- Full name: Torsten George van Jaarsveld
- Born: 30 June 1987 (age 39) Windhoek, South West Africa
- Height: 1.75 m (5 ft 9 in)
- Weight: 106 kg (234 lb; 16 st 10 lb)
- School: Hendrik Verwoerd High School, Pretoria

Rugby union career
- Position: Hooker / Flanker
Youth career
- 2005: Blue Bulls
- 2006–2008: Falcons
Amateur team(s)
Years	Team	Apps	(Points)
2008	UP Tuks	8	(5)
Senior career
Years	Team	Apps	(Points)
2008–2013	Pumas	73	(40)
2013–2014	Free State XV	8	(0)
2014–2017	Free State Cheetahs	21	(5)
2014–2018	Cheetahs	69	(80)
2018–2023	Bayonne	100	(130)
2023–	Stade Montois	0	(0)
- Correct as of 27 September 2023
International career
Years	Team	Apps	(Points)
2012	South African Barbarians (North)	1	(0)
2014–	Namibia	28	(15)
- Correct as of 26 August 2018

Torsten George van Jaarsveld (born 30 June 1987) is a Namibian professional rugby union footballer. He plays mostly as a hooker or flanker. He currently plays for Pro D2 side Stade Montois.

== Career ==
=== Youth and Varsity Cup rugby ===
Van Jaarsveld was selected in the Blue Bulls' Under-18 side for the National Academy Week tournament in 2005. The following year, he made the short move across the Jukskei River to join East Rand-based side the Falcons. He was part of the Under-19 squad for the 2006 Under-19 Provincial Championship and the Under-21 squad for the Under-21 Provincial Championship in 2008.

Van Jaarsveld represented Pretoria-based university side UP Tuks in the inaugural edition of the Varsity Cup in 2008, scoring their third ever try in the competition late in their opening-day 31–31 draw against Maties. He made a total of eight appearances as he helped them to third spot on the log and a semi-final appearance in the competition, where they lost 44–47 to eventual winners Maties. He also made in excess of 50 appearances for UP Tuks in the Blue Bulls' amateur Carlton League.

=== Pumas ===
Van Jaarsveld's first class debut came after he joined Witbank-based side the Pumas for the 2008 Currie Cup First Division. He played off the bench in their 32–24 victory over the Mighty Elephants at the Adcock Stadium in Port Elizabeth, with a second appearance coming against the Leopards in Potchefstroom.

Van Jaarsveld made a further three appearances off the bench during the 2009 Vodacom Cup competition before he established himself as a first-team regular during the 2009 Currie Cup First Division, playing in eleven of their matches during the competition. He made his first start for the Pumas in their 47–12 victory over the Border Bulldogs in East London and scored his first points when he got two tries in their 95–14 victory over former side the Falcons in Kempton Park. However, he broke his leg in their semi-final match against the Mighty Elephants and missed the final and the promotion play-offs, which saw the Pumas promoted to the 2010 Currie Cup Premier Division at the expense of the Boland Cavaliers. However, Van Jaarveld did pick up a personal accolade, winning the Pumas' Most Promising Player of the Year award.

This proved to only be a minor setback to Van Jaarsveld's career as he returned some five months later to play in the 2010 Vodacom Cup, making six appearances. He played in the Premier Division of the Currie Cup for the first time in 2010 and, after playing off the bench for the first four games, he started in seven consecutive matches and scoring his only try for the Pumas at this level in their match against Western Province in Cape Town before an ankle injury ruled him out for the remaining matches of the season. After playing a further six matches during the 2011 Vodacom Cup competition, he had another full season playing in the Currie Cup Premier Division in 2011, which saw the Pumas being relegated to the First Division after a league restructure saw the Premier Division being reduced from eight teams to six.

Van Jaarsveld played in eight matches during the 2012 Vodacom Cup as they reached the semi-finals of this competition. He also played in eleven matches of their 2012 Currie Cup First Division season, which saw the Pumas reach the final of the competition, where they lost 26–25 in the final to the Eastern Province Kings.

In a five-year career at the Pumas, Van Jaarsveld appeared in 73 matches and scored eight tries.

=== Free State Cheetahs / Cheetahs ===
Van Jaarsveld joined Bloemfontein-based side the Free State Cheetahs for the 2013 season. He made two appearances for the Free State XV during the 2012 Vodacom Cup competition, being lauded by coach Joe Beukes, who said after his debut against the SWD Eagles: "He was excellent against the Eagles. He has a lot of Brüssow in him. He defends well, is omnipresent at the breakdown and steal balls regularly". However, in his second match against the Boland Cavaliers, he tore his medial collateral ligament and was ruled out for the remainder of the season.

Van Jaarsveld returned to training at the end of 2013 when he was included in the 52-man wider training group for the Super Rugby side, the Cheetahs. Although he wasn't in reckoning for the Cheetahs at the start of the 2014 Super Rugby season – instead making six appearances for the Free State XV in the 2014 Vodacom Cup – he made his Super Rugby debut on 26 April 2014 when he played off the bench in their 35–22 victory over South African Conference rivals, the Stormers. Two more substitute appearances followed against the Bulls and the return leg against the Stormers, before Van Jaarsveld made his first start in the competition against the Sharks and taking just eight minutes to score the first try of the match as the Cheetahs ran out 27–20 winners.

In July 2014, Free State Cheetahs coach Rory Duncan announced that Van Jaarsveld would captain the side during the 2014 Currie Cup Premier Division season.

=== Bayonne ===
Van Jaarsveld joined French Pro D2 side Bayonne prior to the 2018–19 season on a two-year contract.

=== Representative rugby ===
In 2012, Van Jaarsveld was selected in a South African Barbarians (North) side that faced England during their 2012 tour of South Africa, suffering a 31–57 defeat.

In October 2014, Van Jaarsveld was called up to the Namibian national team for the first time prior to their end-of-year tour to Europe.
