= Evangelical Lutheran Church of Hong Kong =

Lutheran denomination of Christianity

- Traditional Chinese: 基督教香港信義會
- Simplified Chinese: 基督教香港信义会
Transcriptions
Standard Mandarin
- Hanyu Pinyin: Jīdūjiào Xiānggǎng Xìnyì Huì
Yue: Cantonese
- Jyutping: gei1 duk1 gaau3 hoeng1 gong2 seon3 ji6 wui6*2

The Evangelical Lutheran Church of Hong Kong (Chinese: 基督教香港信義會; Abbreviated as ELCHK) is a Lutheran denomination in Hong Kong.

== History ==
On 27 February 1954, its establishing ceremony was held at Tao Fong Shan, Sha Tin with representatives from all Lutheran congregations in Hong Kong joined in. Originally established with the Chinese Lutheran Church in the 1920s, the Lutheran Theological Seminary and the Lutheran Publishing House became part of the ELCHK.

It is a member of the Lutheran World Federation, which it joined in 1957. It is also a member of the Hong Kong Christian Council.

== See also ==
- ELCHK Lutheran Secondary School
