= Jack Neville =

Hong Kong rugby union player

- Born: 16 May 1992 (age 34) Darlington, England
- Height: 1.75 m (5 ft 9 in)
- Weight: 83 kg (13 st 1 lb; 183 lb)
- University: Cardiff University

Rugby union career
- Position(s): Flyhalf, Centre, Fullback
- Current team: Nottingham
Amateur team(s)
Years	Team	Apps	(Points)
2011-2014	Cardiff University		
Senior career
Years	Team	Apps	(Points)
2012-2014	Darlington Mowden Park	7	(25)
2014-2015	Kowloon RFC	5	(21)
2019-2021	South China Tigers	2	(5)
2021-2022	Alcobendas Rugby	13	(39)
2022-	Nottingham	17	(20)
- Correct as of 13 March 2023
International career
Years	Team	Apps	(Points)
2017–	Hong Kong	17	(46)
- Correct as of 13 March 2023
National sevens team
Years	Team		Comps
2015-2019	Hong Kong Sevens		14

Jack Neville is an English born rugby union player who plays for Nottingham Rugby in the RFU Championship. He plays internationally for Hong Kong.

== Career ==
Neville played rugby for Cardiff University while studying a bachelor's degree in Science, Business/Managerial and Economics.

During his time at Cardiff University Neville played for his home town club Darlington Mowden Park, who at the time were in National Two North.

In 2014 Neville joined Hong Kong Premiership side Kowloon RFC, intern joining the HKRU elite rugby programme.

After a period of time with the Hong Kong Sevens team, he joined the South China Tigers squad for the inaugural Global Rapid Rugby season, making 2 appearances at the back end of the season, scoring on debut. Although part of the squad, due to being part of the HKRU elite rugby programme, he did not feature in the 2020 season due to Coronavirus causing the season to be cut short.

In 2021 he joined Spanish División de Honor side Alcobendas where they came runners up in the 2021/22 season.

Neville joined English Championship side Nottingham in 2022 with his former Hong Kong and South China Lions coach Craig Hammond now the Nottingham head coach.

== International career ==
Neville made his international debut, coming off the bench against Russia on the 17th November 2017.

He has since made 17 appearances, scoring 6 tries.

Try	Opposing team	Venue	Competition	Date	Result	Score
1	Malaysia	National Stadium, Kuala Lumpur	2018 Asia Rugby Championship	05/05/2018	Win	8 - 67
2	Malaysia	Hong Kong Football Club Stadium, Hong Kong	2018 Asia Rugby Championship	26/05/2018	Win	91 - 10
3	Malaysia	National Stadium, Kuala Lumpur	2019 Asia Rugby Championship	22/06/2019	Win	0 - 71
4	South Korea	Hong Kong Football Club Stadium, Hong Kong	2019 Asia Rugby Championship	29/06/2019	Win	64 - 3
5	South Korea	Hong Kong Football Club Stadium, Hong Kong	2019 Asia Rugby Championship	29/06/2019	Win	64 - 3
6	Portugal	The Sevens Stadium, Dubai	RWC 2023 Final Qualification Tournament	6/11/2022	Loss	42 - 14

== Honours ==
2017 Cup of Nations Runners Up (Hong Kong)

2018 Asia Rugby Championship (Hong Kong)

2019 Asia Rugby Championship (Hong Kong)

2021/22 División de Honor Runners Up (Alcobendas)

2022 Asia Rugby Championship (Hong Kong)
