= Eben Joubert =

South African rugby union player

Ebén Joubert
- Born: 30 June 1983 (age 43) Johannesburg, South Africa
- Height: 1.80 m (5 ft 11 in)
- Weight: 103 kg (16 st 3 lb)
- University: University of Pretoria

Rugby union career
- Position: Flanker
Provincial / State sides
Years	Team	Apps	(Points)
2007	Blue Bulls	2	(0)
2008–	Otago	18	(10)
- Correct as of 10 August 2011

Eben Joubert, born June 30, 1983, in Johannesburg, South Africa, is a former South African rugby union player. He played for Otago in the ITM Cup competition in New Zealand and was named captain of the team in 2011.

== Playing career ==
After completing his studies at the University of Pretoria, Joubert briefly featured for the Blue Bulls provincial squad, making one appearance each in the Currie Cup and Vodacom Cup in 2007. Despite facing challenges due to his relatively small stature for a flanker in South Africa, he seized an opportunity to advance his professional career in New Zealand in 2008.

Joubert's impressive performances in club rugby in Dunedin earned him a spot on the Otago team for the 2008 Air New Zealand Cup. He became a regular player in 2008 and 2009, but his career was derailed when he suffered a severe shoulder injury in a Ranfurly Shield match against Southland during the 2010 ITM Cup season. The injury was further complicated by a post-surgery infection, which led to a lengthy hospitalization of nearly two months, ruling him out for the entire season.

Back healthy for the 2011 ITM Cup, Joubert was named the captain of the Otago squad. He helped get his side off to a terrific start, scoring his first two provincial tries in an opening-week victory over North Harbour, and then led Otago to their first victory in Auckland since 1976. However, his season was ended after 4 matches by a damaged knee.

Eben now lives in the Netherlands with his family where he is a director for Hilti and is married to Melanie Joubert, co-founder of beauty brand Sweet Rumour.
