= King's Park, Hong Kong =

Area of Kowloon, Hong Kong

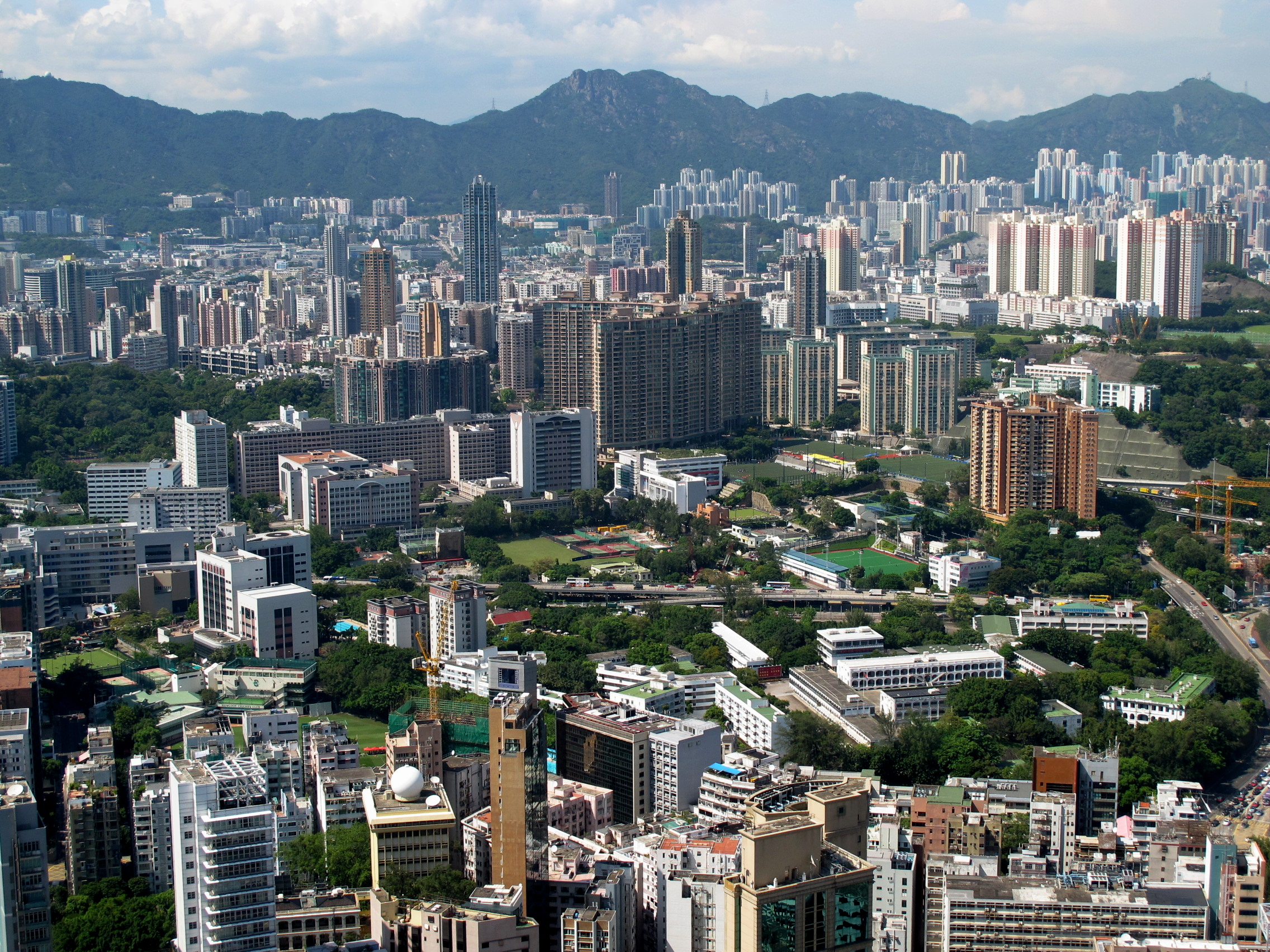
- King's Park in 2011
- Chinese: 京士柏
Transcriptions
Standard Mandarin
- Hanyu Pinyin: Jīngshì Bó
Yue: Cantonese
- Jyutping: Ging1 si6 paak3

Alternative Chinese name
- Chinese: 皇囿
Transcriptions
Standard Mandarin
- Hanyu Pinyin: Huángyòu
Yue: Cantonese
- Jyutping: Wong4 jau6

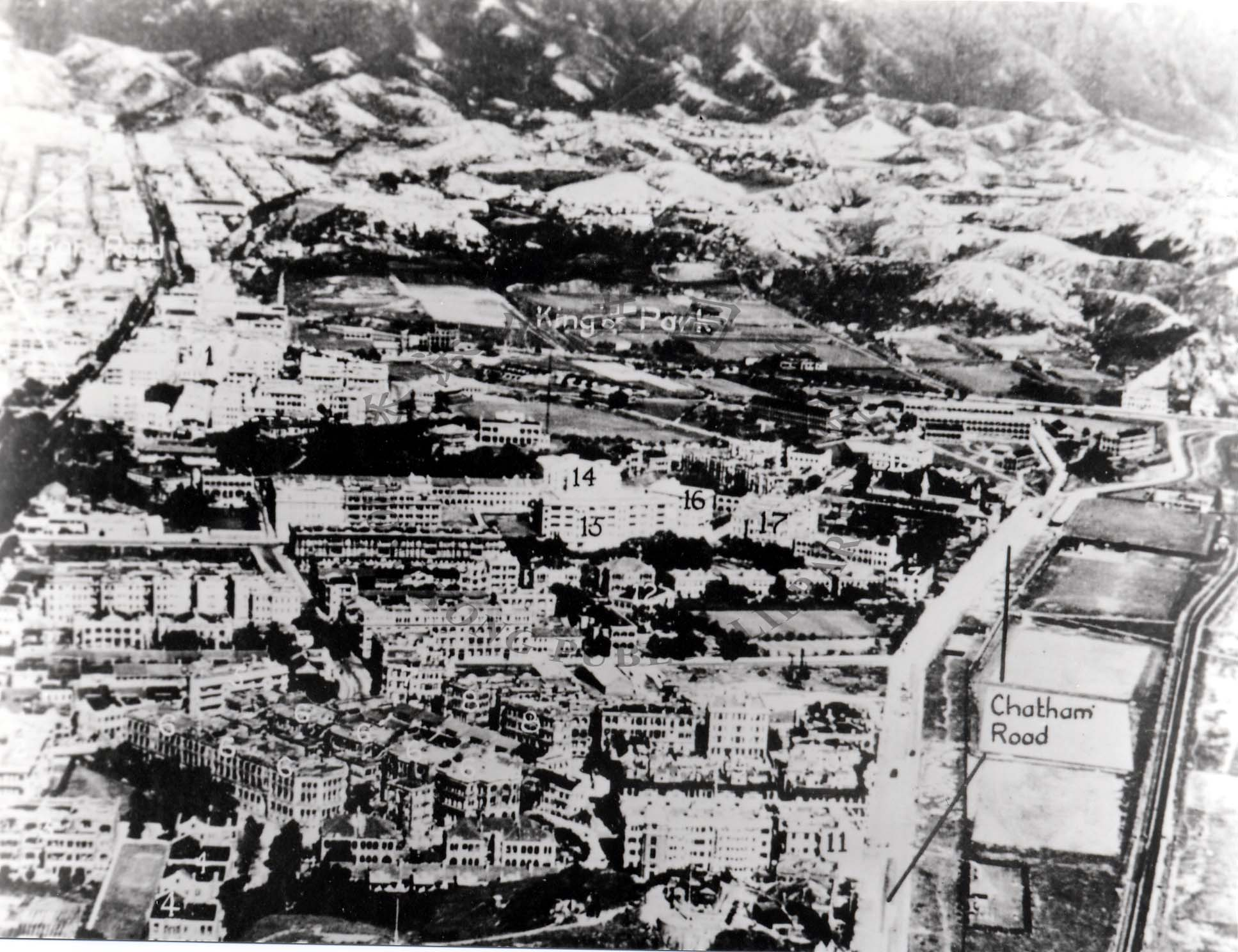
Aerial photo of Kowloon c.1930. King's Park is at upper half of the photo

King's Park is an area in Yau Tsim Mong District in Kowloon, Hong Kong.

== Location ==
It is bounded approximately by Waterloo Road to the north, the East Rail line to the east, Austin Road to the south, and Nathan Road to the west. There is an elevated portion which is considered the boundary with Yau Ma Tei.

== Topography ==
The northern areas is hilly, while the southern section is relatively flat.

== Uses ==
The area is zoned for Government, residential and recreational use, and there are no commercial outlets.

The hill north hosts a meteorological station of the Hong Kong Observatory, the Blood Transfusion Centre of Hong Kong Red Cross and the Queen Elizabeth Hospital.

From 1967 until June 1995, the 15-storey British Military Hospital (BMH) was also based in the area, on a site to the east of the Queen Elizabeth Hospital. It was closed in 1995 as the British Garrison scaled down from more than 10,000 personnel to about 3,000 as 1997 approached. The 7.4 hectares (18 acres) site had an estimated market value of HK$5.6 billion in 1995.

The site on which the hospital buildings once were was sold by 1999, and is now a private housing estate, whilst the fields which once surrounded the hospital have been largely preserved due to the lobbying efforts of a group of sporting associations. The Kings Park Sports Association (KPSA) was then formed, with Hong Kong Rugby Football Union as one of its core members.

In 1987, land to the south of the BMH was developed into Wylie Court, a residential estate for civil servants. The Civil Service Club is located nearby.

The southern portion of King's Park is a flat piece of land, hosting various recreation clubs and green sports grounds, including King's Park Hockey Ground, King's Park Sports Ground, Kowloon Bowling Green Club, YMCA Recreation Ground, the United Services Recreation Club, Kowloon Cricket Club, and Gun Club Hill Barracks, are located south of Gascoigne Road.

The headquarters of Hong Kong Girl Guides Association is situated at Gascoigne Road near its eastern side.

== Education ==
Several schools are located in King's Park, including ELCHK Lutheran Secondary School, Methodist College, True Light Girls' College, Tung Wah College, King's Park Campus and Wah Yan College, Kowloon.

King's Park is in Primary One Admission (POA) School Net 31. Within the school net are multiple aided schools (operated independently but funded with government money) and Jordan Road Government Primary School.

== Climate ==
Climate data for King's Park (1993–2020, extremes 1992–present)
Month	Jan	Feb	Mar	Apr	May	Jun	Jul	Aug	Sep	Oct	Nov	Dec	Year
Record high °C (°F)	27.5 (81.5)	28.7 (83.7)	30.7 (87.3)	31.8 (89.2)	34.9 (94.8)	35.1 (95.2)	35.7 (96.3)	36.9 (98.4)	35.6 (96.1)	33.6 (92.5)	31.6 (88.9)	30.5 (86.9)	36.9 (98.4)
Mean daily maximum °C (°F)	19.4 (66.9)	20.0 (68.0)	22.1 (71.8)	25.6 (78.1)	28.8 (83.8)	30.6 (87.1)	31.4 (88.5)	31.2 (88.2)	30.6 (87.1)	28.4 (83.1)	25.2 (77.4)	21.1 (70.0)	26.2 (79.2)
Daily mean °C (°F)	16.1 (61.0)	16.8 (62.2)	19.2 (66.6)	22.7 (72.9)	26.0 (78.8)	28.0 (82.4)	28.6 (83.5)	28.4 (83.1)	27.6 (81.7)	25.3 (77.5)	21.9 (71.4)	17.8 (64.0)	23.2 (73.8)
Mean daily minimum °C (°F)	13.8 (56.8)	14.6 (58.3)	16.9 (62.4)	20.6 (69.1)	23.9 (75.0)	26.0 (78.8)	26.4 (79.5)	26.2 (79.2)	25.5 (77.9)	23.2 (73.8)	19.7 (67.5)	15.3 (59.5)	21.0 (69.8)
Record low °C (°F)	2.6 (36.7)	5.1 (41.2)	7.3 (45.1)	10.2 (50.4)	15.7 (60.3)	20.2 (68.4)	22.0 (71.6)	22.2 (72.0)	18.6 (65.5)	14.9 (58.8)	8.8 (47.8)	4.8 (40.6)	2.6 (36.7)
Average precipitation mm (inches)	32.4 (1.28)	30.3 (1.19)	68.7 (2.70)	137.4 (5.41)	279.5 (11.00)	463.7 (18.26)	354.3 (13.95)	455.1 (17.92)	321.9 (12.67)	121.5 (4.78)	40.0 (1.57)	27.4 (1.08)	2,332.2 (91.81)
Average relative humidity (%)	71.5	77.0	80.3	82.5	82.5	82.8	81.5	81.9	77.6	71.7	70.6	66.4	77.2
Mean monthly sunshine hours	145.3	102.6	103.1	114.0	138.2	144.0	196.5	181.5	174.0	196.2	169.9	163.0	1,828.3
Source: Hong Kong Observatory
