= Llewellyn Winckler =

Namibia international rugby union player

- Full name: Llewellyn Paul Winckler
- Born: 7 September 1987 (age 39) Windhoek, Namibia

Rugby union career
- Position: Wing
International career
Years	Team	Apps	(Points)
2008-2011	Namibia	12	(10)
- Correct as of 9 September 2019

Llewellyn Paul Winckler (born 7 September 1987) is a former Namibian rugby union player who played as a wing represented Namibia internationally from 2008 to 2011. He made his international debut for Namibia against Zimbabwe on 2 August 2008. Winckler was included in the Namibian squad for the 2011 Rugby World Cup and played in two group stage matches.
