= Paul Bosch =

South African rugby union player

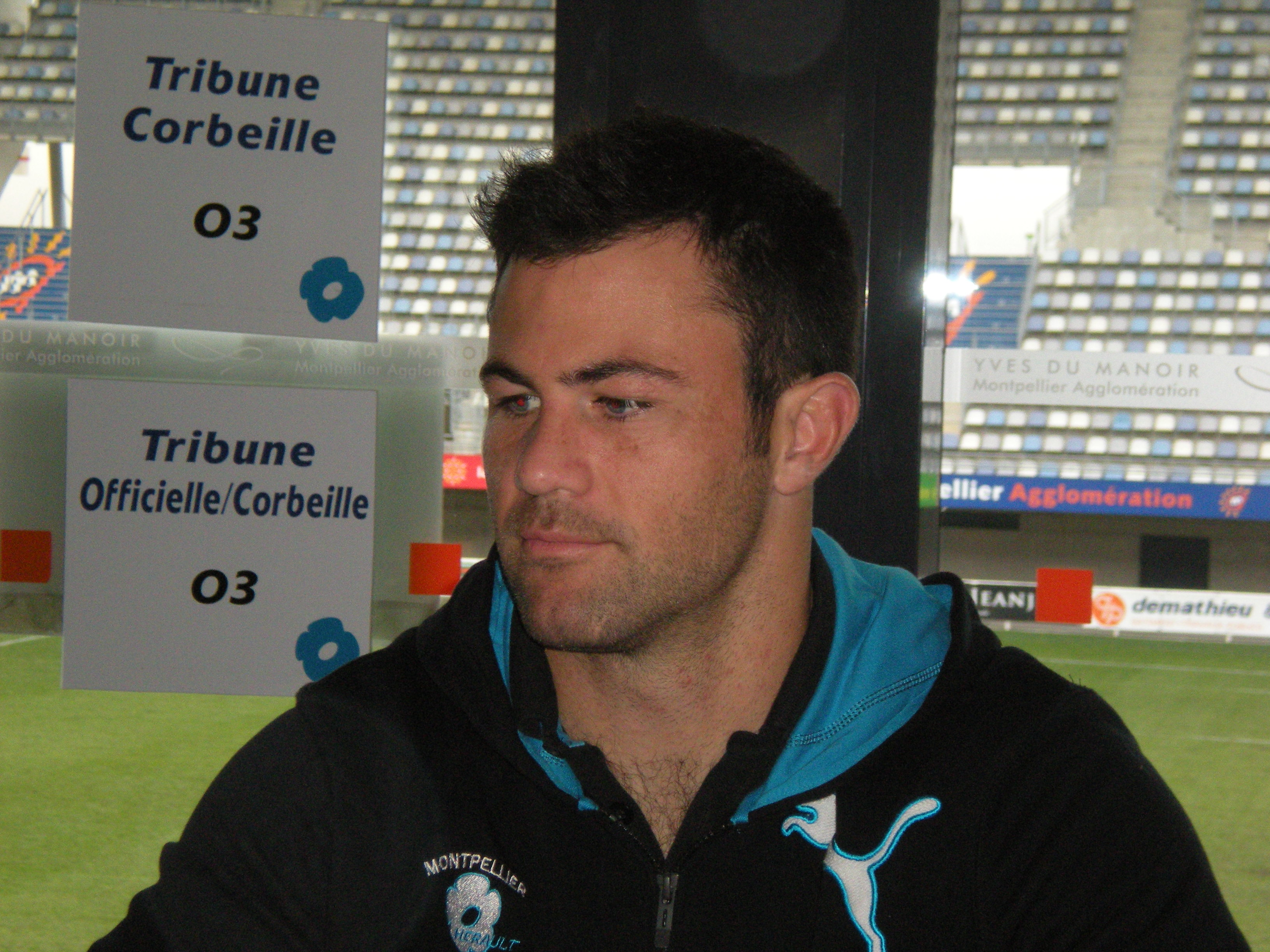
- Born: Paul Wilhelm Bosch; 24 September 1984 (age 42) Pretoria, South Africa
- Height: 1.80 m (5 ft 11 in)
- Weight: 92 kg (14 st 7 lb; 203 lb)
- School: Ellisras High
- University: University of Pretoria, North-West University, Blue Chip Aviation, Stellenbosch University

Rugby union career
- Position: Centre
Senior career
Years	Team	Apps	(Points)
2011–2013	Montpellier	38	(5)
2013–present	USO Nevers	39	(20)
- Correct as of 23 May 2017
Provincial / State sides
Years	Team	Apps	(Points)
2006–2008	Leopards		
2008–2011	Western Province	33	(15)
- Correct as of 23 November 2012
Super Rugby
Years	Team	Apps	(Points)
2011	Stormers	0	(0)
- Correct as of 23 November 2012
International career
Years	Team	Apps	(Points)
2015-present	Germany	7	(0)

Paul Bosch (born 24 September 1984 in Pretoria, South Africa) is a professional German rugby union player, of South African origin. He usually plays as a centre.

== Career ==
In 2003-04, Bosch played an entire season for Ponteland Rugby Club in Northumberland, England. He currently plays for the US Nevers (France) after signing from Montpellier in Top 14 (2011-2013), Western Province (2008-2011) and Leopards (2006-2008) in South Africa's Currie Cup, and the Stormers in Super Rugby (2011).

On 14 February 2015, he made his debut for Germany against Russia.
