= King's Park Sports Ground =

Rugby sports venue in Hong Kong

Coordinates: 22.309°N 114.178°E

- 京士柏運動場
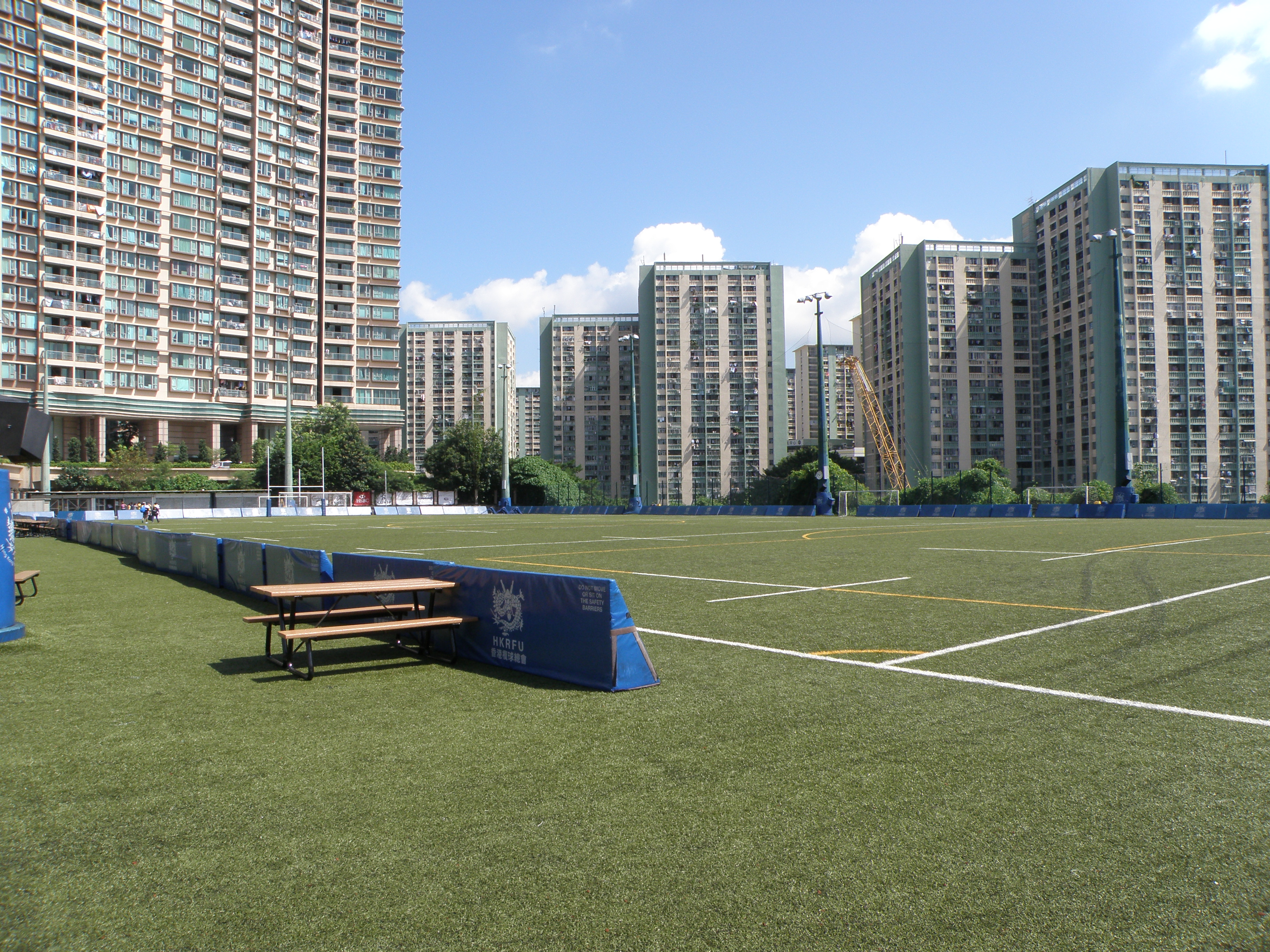
- Interactive map of King's Park Sports Ground
- Address: 11 Wylie Path, Ho Man Tin, Kowloon
- Owner: Hong Kong China Rugby Union
- Operator: Hong Kong China Rugby Union
- Surface: Artificial turf

The King's Park Sports Ground (Chinese: 京士柏運動場) is a rugby sports ground located in King's Park. It is owned and operated by the Hong Kong China Rugby Union, with advice from the King's Park Sports Association. The sports ground is covered with artificial turf.

== History ==
The playing fields at King's Park were once part of the British Army Garrison estate. The land had then been managed by the Government Property Agency after the handover of Hong Kong in 1997. The funding for up-keep and general maintenance to the ground and attendant facilities had been minimal. In 1998, a King's Park users group was formed with the approval of Government Property Agency to assist with the maintenance of the sports ground through monetary means.

Plans for the playing fields at King's Park were once assumed that it would be turned into a housing projects, which were however later shelved. The Hong Kong Rugby Union had entered a tenancy agreement with the government in 2002, which the sports ground was allocated to the Hong Kong Rugby Union in September of the same year. The King's Park Sports Association was subsequently formed to advise the Hong Kong Rugby Union on the sports ground's management.

== Member clubs ==
- Hong Kong China Rugby Union
- Hong Kong Slo-pitch Softball Association
- Yau Yee Football League
- United Services Recreation Club
- Kowloon Cricket Club
- USRC Tigers RFC

== Users ==
- Special Olympics Hong Kong
- Hong Kong Polytechnic University
- Hong Kong Blind Sports Federation
- Diocesan Boys' School
- Hong Kong International School
- Sha Tin College
- Royale International Legal League Hong Kong
- Hong Kong Junior Football League
- Hong Kong Rugby League
- Eastern Sports Club
- Hong Kong Gaelic Football Club
