= United Services Recreation Club =

Club in Kowloon, Hong Kong

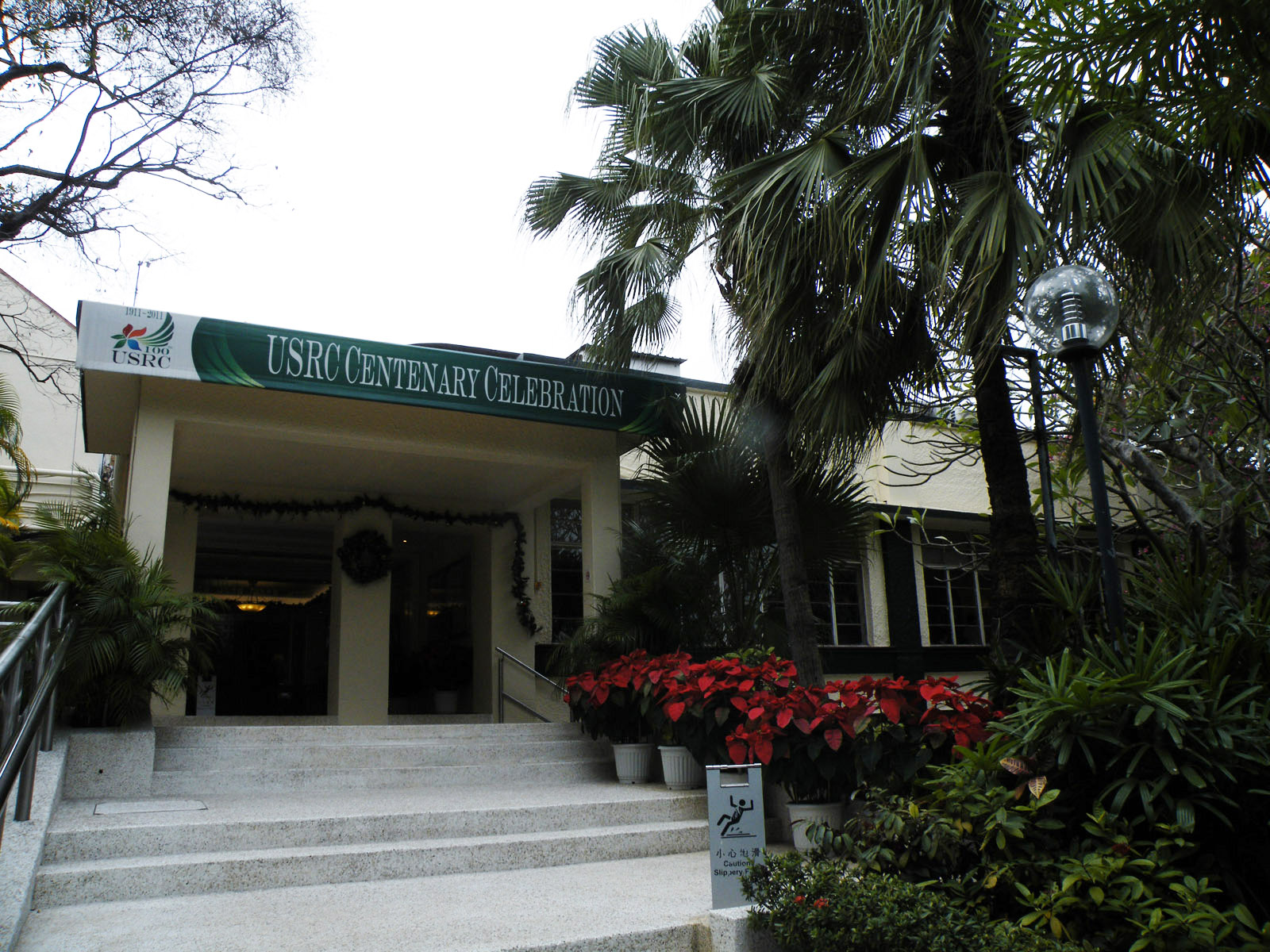
- Main building of USRC
- Formation: 1911
- Location: 1 Gascoigne Road, Yau Ma Tei, Kowloon, Hong Kong
- Website: www.usrc.org.hk

The United Services Recreation Club (USRC) (Chinese: 三軍會; lit. 'three armed-forces club') is a club located on Gun Club Hill Barracks site at Gascoigne Road in Kowloon, Hong Kong. Originally it was a British colonial establishment but now is a property of the People's Liberation Army after they took over the barracks on 1 July 1997.

== History ==
The club was founded in 1911 for the benefit of British officer-level personnel. It was considered one of the key social clubs for military officers. During the Japanese occupation, it was used by Japanese military personnel. Queen Elizabeth Hospital was built on the USRC's former golf course.

After the handover of Hong Kong to China, the land on which the USRC is located is now property of the PLA garrison. However, according to previous agreements the PLA has not intervened with the club's activities, and shares no profits. In 2011, a book was published called Trees of the United Services Recreation Club.

From the beginning, the club admitted civilian members in order to balance out the transient nature of the military population.

Today, the majority of members are civilians.

== Membership ==
A corporate member needs to pay one-off payment of HK$651,000 to join the club while the ordinary membership fee is HK$300,000. In addition there is monthly subscription fee of HK$1,390.

== Sports ==
USRC sponsors various sporting activities, most notably the USRC Tigers RFC, a semi-professional rugby union team as well as youth teams. The nearby King's Park is seen as the home ground for the club's rugby and football teams. Main facilities provided by the club include a bowling green, an outdoor swimming pool, and four floodlit tennis courts. There are also indoor or outdoor courts for cricket, squash, basketball, etc.

== See also ==
- Foreign Correspondents' Club
- Hong Kong Football Club
