= Shuhei Kubo =

Japanese rugby union referee

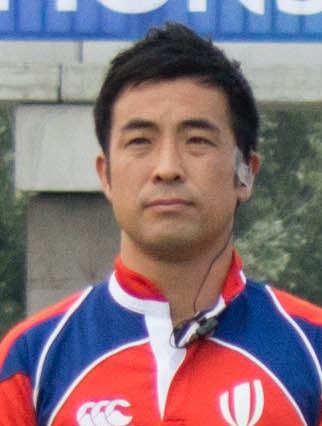
- Kubo in 2015
- Born: Shuhei Kubo; 9 June 1981 (age 45) Tsukushi, Kyushu, Japan
- Occupation: Full time referee

Rugby union career
Refereeing career
Years	Competition	Apps
2012–2015	WR U20 Championship/Trophy	10
2013–Present	Top League	36
2013–Present	Test Matches	9
2016	Super Rugby	2
- Correct as of 21 December 2016

Shuhei Kubo (久保 修平, Kubo Shūhei; born June 9, 1981 in Tsukushi, Japan) is a Japanese rugby union referee, who is an A class referee in the Japan Rugby Football Union.

Kubo, now a referee on the Top League refereeing panel, was a member of a 4-man officials panel for the 2012 IRB Junior World Rugby Trophy before he had even made his Top League debut. Later that year, he made his League debut, refereeing Toyota Verblitz against NEC Green Rockets on 26 January 2013. That same year, he was promoted up to the IRB Junior World Championship from the trophy where refereed three games.

== International referee ==
On 17 December 2013 he made his international refereeing debut, taking charge of the first test between Hong Kong and Belgium.

In 2014, he appeared in the 2014 Asian Five Nations, which also doubled as 2015 Rugby World Cup qualification, where he managed two matches. In 2015, Kubo return to the World Rugby Under 20 Championship, which saw him manage three games, including New Zealand v Argentina and the 7th place game, Scotland v Ireland. On 10 September 2015, Kubo became the first Japanese referee to officiate an ITM Cup match, refereeing Waikato's clash against Southland. The following week he took charge of Tasman's home game against North Harbour.

In 2016, he became the first Japanese referee to referee a Super Rugby match. He was in charge of the game between the Southern Kings and the Bulls. That year he also refereed three World Rugby internationals, taking charge of Canada against Russia during the June international window, before finishing the year with his first Tier 2 v Tier 2 game (Romania v Canada) having previously only refereed matches that has featured Tier 3 nations.
