= Matthew Rosslee =

HK international rugby union player (born 1987)

- Born: Matthew Ryan Rosslee; 24 February 1987 (age 39) Cape Town, South Africa
- Height: 1.84 m (6 ft 1/2 in)
- Weight: 96 kg (15 st 2 lb)
- School: Rondebosch Boys' High School
- University: University of Cape Town

Rugby union career
- Position: Fly-Half / Inside-Centre
Provincial / State sides
Years	Team	Apps	(Points)
2008	W. Province	2	(0)
2010–2012	Griquas	32	(30)
2016–2019	Hong Kong	25	(201)
- Correct as of 14 October 2012
International career
Years	Team	Apps	(Points)
2016–2019	Hong Kong	25	(201)
- Correct as of 19 May 2024

Matthew Rosslee (born 24 February 1987) is a South African former professional rugby union footballer. His regular playing position was fly-half and inside-centre. He represented the Griquas in the Currie Cup and Vodacom Cup. He previously played for Western Province in the Currie Cup and played in the Varsity Cup for the Ikey Tigers.

He is currently the 4th highest points scorer in Varsity Cup history with 219 points scored playing for FNB UCT between 2008-10; and the top points scorer for a Hong Kong Men’s 15s player with 201 points scored between 2016-19.

He finished playing his rugby in Hong Kong after he signed a playing contract with Hong Kong China Rugby (formerly Hong Kong Rugby Football Union) where he accumulated 25 test caps and played in the domestic Hong Kong Rugby Premiership for Societe Generale Valley RFC.

He made his debut for Hong Kong against Kenya in August 2016. He played a key role in two Asia Rugby Championship title victories in 2018 and 2019. Matthew played his final game for Hong Kong on 23 November 2019 against Spain, losing 29-7 at the Estadio Central Universad Compultense, Madrid.

He was the playing captain of Societe Generale Valley Rugby Football Club. The club won the Grand Championships in the 2014/15 and 2015/16 playing seasons under his captaincy.

During his tenure with Valley RFC the team won 5 Grand Championships in total in 2013/14, 2014/15, 2015/16, 2016/17 and 2018/19. He retired from professional rugby during the Covid-19 pandemic, where Hong Kong had no international fixtures between November 2019 and July 2022.

He has previously been involved with the Cheetahs Super Rugby squad, the SA Premier XV (2011), SA Students XV (2009), and SA Students 7's who won the 2008 Student World Cup 7's in Spain.
