= 1970 ARFU Asian Rugby Championship =

1970 Asian Rugby Championship
Tournament details
- Host: Thailand
- Date: 10–18 January 1970
- Countries: 7

Final positions
- Champions: Japan (2nd title)

Tournament statistics
- Matches played: 12

The 1970 Asian Rugby Championship was the second edition of the tournament played in Bangkok, Thailand. Seven countries played round-robin matches in two pools and the first, second, and third place of each pool played placement matches. Japan won the tournament.

== Tournament ==
=== Pool A ===
Place	Nation	Games				Points			Table points
Place	Nation	Played	Won	Drawn	Lost	For	Against	Difference	Table points
1	Thailand	3	2	1	0	57	34	23	5
2	Hong Kong	3	2	0	1	52	32	20	4
3	Ceylon	3	1	1	1	49	43	6	3
3	Malaysia	3	0	0	3	23	72	-49	0

10 January 1970

Thailand	19–19	Ceylon

National Stadium, Bangkok

10 January 1970

Hong Kong	22–14	Malaysia

National Stadium, Bangkok

12 January 1970

Hong Kong	21–6	Ceylon

National Stadium, Bangkok

12 January 1970

Thailand	26–6	Malaysia

National Stadium, Bangkok

14 January 1970

Ceylon	24–3	Malaysia

National Stadium, Bangkok

14 January 1970

Hong Kong	9–12	Thailand

National Stadium, Bangkok

- Results

Jan 10
Jan 12

=== Pool B ===
Place	Nation	Games				Points			Table points
Place	Nation	Played	Won	Drawn	Lost	For	Against	Difference	Table points
1	Japan	2	2	0	0	69	26	43	4
2	Singapore	2	1	0	1	54	57	-3	2
3	South Korea	2	0	0	2	20	60	-40	0

11 January 1970

Singapore	17–46	Japan XV
	Report

National Stadium, Bangkok

13 January 1970

South Korea	9–23	Japan XV

National Stadium, Bangkok

15 January 1970

South Korea	11–37	Singapore

National Stadium, Bangkok

- Results

Jan 11
Jan 13
Jan 15

== Placement matches ==
=== 5th place match ===
18 January 1970

South Korea	12–8	Sri Lanka

National Stadium, Bangkok

=== 3rd place match ===
18 January 1970

Hong Kong	9–6	Singapore

National Stadium, Bangkok

=== Final ===
18 January 1970

Thailand	11–42	Japan XV
Try: Jettanakorn (46')	Report	Try: Mizutani (23'); Mizutani(34'); Mantani(30'); Ito (50'); Ito (68'); Ito (74'); Sakata (61'); Con: Yamaguchi (23’, 34’, 50’, 61’, 68’, 74); Pen: Yamaguchi( 2’, 9’, 14’)

National Stadium, Bangkok
Referee: Anata Boonsupa (Thailand)

Thailand: Somsak; Suradet; Ban, Davidson, Blackburn; Jettanakorn; Amnu; Horn, Vikron, Niroj; Apichat, P. Walter; N. Walter, Piyachan, Abhirak. Coach: ???.
Japan: Morio Kawasaki; Mitsuo Atokawa, Masaaki Shimozono, Hiroshi Ogasawara, Toshio Terai; Katsumi Kamata; Yoshiaki Izawa, Yoshiharu Yamaguchi; Satoru Matsuoka, Ryozo Imazato, Chikara Katsuraguchi; Yoshihiro Sakata, Makoto Mizutani; Masayoshi Ozaki, Bunji Shimazaki; Tadayuki Ito (capt.), Masaharu Mantani. Coach: Tetsunosuke Onishi

== Final standings ==
Rank	Team	Record
1st place, gold medalist(s)	Japan	3–0–0
2nd place, silver medalist(s)	Thailand	2–1–1
3rd place, bronze medalist(s)	Hong Kong	3–0–1
4	Singapore	1–0–2
5	South Korea	1–0–2
6	Ceylon	1–1–2
7	Malaysia	0–0–3

== Notes ==
As of 16 June 2022, the results in Asia Rugby website are incorrect.
