= 1978 ARFU Asian Rugby Championship =

1978 Asian Rugby Championship
Tournament details
- Host: Malaysia
- Date: 16–25 November 1978
- Countries: 7

Final positions
- Champions: Japan (6th title)

Tournament statistics
- Matches played: 11

The 1978 ARFU Asian Rugby Championship was the 6th edition of the tournament, and was played in Kuala Lumpur. The 7 teams were divided in two pool, with final between the winner of both of them. Japan won the tournament.

== Tournament ==
=== Pool A ===
Place	Nation	Games				Points			Table points
Place	Nation	played	won	drawn	lost	for	against	difference	Table points
1	Japan	2	2	0	0	81	26	55	4
2	Thailand	2	1	0	1	37	57	-20	2
3	Sri Lanka	2	0	0	2	18	53	-35	0

16 November 1978

Japan XV	47–18	Thailand

Kuala Lumpur

19 November 1978

Thailand	19–10	Sri Lanka

Kuala Lumpur

23 November 1978

Japan XV	34–8	Sri Lanka

Kuala Lumpur

=== Pool B ===
Place	Nation	Games				Points			Table points
Place	Nation	played	won	drawn	lost	for	against	difference	Table points
1	South Korea	3	3	0	0	109	3	106	6
2	Singapore	3	2	0	1	38	64	-26	4
3	Hong Kong	3	0	1	2	9	26	-17	1
4	Malaysia	3	0	1	2	15	78	-63	1

16 November 1978

South Korea	40–3	Singapore

Kuala Lumpur

16 November 1978

Malaysia	0–0	Hong Kong

Kuala Lumpur

19 November 1978

South Korea	7–0	Hong Kong

Kuala Lumpur

19 November 1978

Singapore	9–3	Malaysia

Kuala Lumpur

23 November 1978

Singapore	19–9	Hong Kong

Kuala Lumpur

23 November 1978

South Korea	62–0	Malaysia

Kuala Lumpur

=== Finals ===
==== Third Place Final ====
25 November 1978

Singapore	16–15	Thailand

Kuala Lumpur

==== First Place Final ====
25 November 1978

Japan	16–4	South Korea

Kuala Lumpur
