= 1984 ARFU Asian Rugby Championship =

1984 Asian Rugby Championship
Tournament details
- Host: Japan
- Date: 21–27 October 1984
- Countries: 8

Final positions
- Champions: Japan

Tournament statistics
- Matches played: 14

The 1984 ARFU Asian Rugby Championship was the 9th edition of the tournament, and was played in Fukuoka, Japan. The final match was held between the winners of the two pools, and the third-place match between the runners-up Japan won the tournament.

== Tournament ==
=== Pool A ===
Place	Nation	Games				Points			Table points
Place	Nation	played	won	drawn	lost	for	against	difference	Table points
1	South Korea	3	3	0	0	212	9	203	6
2	Thailand	3	1	1	1	27	116	-89	3
3	Sri Lanka	3	1	0	2	23	90	-67	2
4	Malaysia	3	0	1	2	36	83	-47	1

21 October 1984

South Korea	69–3	Sri Lanka

Fukuoka

21 October 1984

Malaysia	18–18	Thailand

Fukuoka

23 October 1984

South Korea	51–6	Malaysia

Fukuoka

23 October 1984

Thailand	9–6	Sri Lanka

Fukuoka

25 October 1984

Sri Lanka	14–12	Malaysia

Fukuoka

25 October 1984

South Korea	92–0	Thailand

Fukuoka

=== Pool B ===
Place	Nation	Games				Points			Table points
Place	Nation	played	won	drawn	lost	for	against	difference	Table points
1	Japan	3	3	0	0	182	10	172	6
2	Taiwan	3	2	0	1	72	50	22	4
3	Hong Kong	3	1	0	2	67	70	-3	2
4	Singapore	3	0	0	3	12	203	-191	0

21 October 1984

Taiwan	55–3	Singapore

Fukuoka

21 October 1984

Japan XV	54–0	Hong Kong

Kasuga

23 October 1984

Hong Kong	64–3	Singapore

Fukuoka

23 October 1984

Japan XV	44–4	Taiwan

Kasuga

25 October 1984

Taiwan	13–3	Hong Kong

Fukuoka

26 October 1984

Japan XV	84–6	Singapore

Fukuoka

=== Finals ===
==== Third Place Final ====
27 October 1984

Taiwan	30–3	Thailand

Fukuoka

==== First Place Final ====
27 October 1984

Japan	20–13	South Korea

Fukuoka
