= 1994 ARFU Asian Rugby Championship =

1994 Asian Rugby Championship
Tournament details
- Host: Malaysia
- Date: 22–29 October 1994
- Countries: 8

Final positions
- Champions: Japan (10th title)

Tournament statistics
- Matches played: 14

The 1994 ARFU Asian Rugby Championship was the 14th edition of the tournament, and was played in Kuala Lumpur. It also doubled up as the Asian qualifying tournament for the 1995 Rugby World Cup. The eight teams were divided in two pools with a round robin played in each. The top teams in each pool then played off in the final to decide the tournament winner. Japan won the competition, defeating South Korea by 26–11 in the final, and subsequently represented Asia in the 1995 Rugby World Cup.

== Tournament ==
=== Pool 1 ===
Place	Nation	Games				Points			Table points
Place	Nation	played	won	drawn	lost	for	against	difference	Table points
1	Japan	3	3	0	0	226	17	209	6
2	Taiwan	3	2	0	1	53	80	-27	4
3	Malaysia	3	1	0	2	47	144	-97	2
4	Sri Lanka	3	0	0	3	30	115	-85	0

22 October 1994

Japan	56–5	Taiwan

Kuala Lumpur

22 October 1994

Malaysia	23–18	Sri Lanka

Kuala Lumpur

24 October 1994

Japan	67–3	Sri Lanka

Kuala Lumpur

24 October 1994

Malaysia	15–23	Taiwan

Kuala Lumpur

26 October 1994

Malaysia	6-103	Japan

Kuala Lumpur

26 October 1994

Taiwan	25–9	Sri Lanka

Kuala Lumpur

=== Pool 2 ===
Place	Nation	Games				Points			Table points
Place	Nation	played	won	drawn	lost	for	against	difference	Table points
1	South Korea	3	3	0	0	183	31	152	6
2	Hong Kong	3	2	0	1	274	41	233	4
3	Thailand	3	1	0	2	80	163	-83	2
4	Singapore	3	0	0	3	21	323	-302	0

23 October 1994

South Korea	28–17	Hong Kong

Kuala Lumpur

23 October 1994

Thailand	69–5	Singapore

Kuala Lumpur

25 October 1994

Hong Kong	93–0	Thailand

Kuala Lumpur

25 October 1994

South Korea	90–3	Singapore

Kuala Lumpur

27 October 1994

Hong Kong	164–13	Singapore

Kuala Lumpur

27 October 1994

South Korea	65–11	Thailand

Kuala Lumpur

=== Finals ===
==== Play-off for 3rd ====
29 October 1994

Hong Kong	80–26	Taiwan

Kuala Lumpur

==== Final ====
29 October 1994

Japan	26–11	South Korea

Kuala Lumpur
