= 1990 ARFU Asian Rugby Championship =

1990 Asian Rugby Championship
Tournament details
- Host: Sri Lanka
- Date: 20–27 October 1990
- Countries: 8

Final positions
- Champions: South Korea (4th title)

Tournament statistics
- Matches played: 14

The 1990 ARFU Asian Rugby Championship was the 12th edition of the tournament, and was played in Colombo. The 8 teams were divided in two pool, with final between the winner of both of them. South Korea won the tournament.

== Tournament ==
=== Pool 1 ===
Place	Nation	Games				Points			Table points
Place	Nation	played	won	drawn	lost	for	against	difference	Table points
1	South Korea	3	3	0	0	63	34	29	6
2	Hong Kong	3	1	0	2	43	41	2	2
3	Taiwan	3	1	0	2	24	37	-13	2
4	Sri Lanka	3	1	0	2	35	53	-18	2

20 October 1990

South Korea	21–6	Taiwan

Colombo

20 October 1990

Sri Lanka	13–21	Hong Kong

Colombo

22 October 1990

Hong Kong	15–16	South Korea

Colombo

22 October 1990

Sri Lanka	9–6	Taiwan

Colombo

24 October 1990

South Korea	26–13	Sri Lanka

Colombo

24 October 1990

Taiwan	12–7	Hong Kong

Colombo

=== Pool 2 ===
Place	Nation	Games				Points			Table points
Place	Nation	played	won	drawn	lost	for	against	difference	Table points
1	Japan	3	3	0	0	191	21	170	6
2	Thailand	3	1	1	1	80	85	-5	3
3	Malaysia	3	1	1	1	29	70	-41	3
4	Singapore	3	0	0	3	15	139	-124	0

21 October 1990

Japan XV	45–3	Malaysia

Colombo

21 October 1990

Thailand	49–3	Singapore

Colombo

23 October 1990

Japan XV	66–15	Thailand

Colombo

23 October 1990

Malaysia	10–9	Singapore

Colombo

25 October 1990

Japan XV	80–3	Singapore

Colombo

25 October 1990

Malaysia	16–16	Thailand

Colombo

=== Finals ===
==== Third Place Final ====
27 October 1990

Hong Kong	50–15	Thailand

Colombo

==== First Place Final ====
27 October 1990

South Korea	13–9	Japan

Colombo
