= 1974 ARFU Asian Rugby Championship =

1974 Asian Rugby Championship
Tournament details
- Host: Sri Lanka
- Date: 17–23 November 1974
- Countries: 8

Final positions
- Champions: Japan (4th title)

Tournament statistics
- Matches played: 14

The 1974 ARFU Asian Rugby Championship was the 4th edition of the tournament, and was played in Colombo. The 8 teams were divided into two pools, with the final consisting of the winning teams. Japan won the tournament.

== Tournament ==
=== Pool A ===
Place	Nation	Games				Points			Table points
Place	Nation	played	won	drawn	lost	for	against	difference	Table points
1	Japan	3	3	0	0	96	31	65	6
2	South Korea	3	1	0	2	59	48	11	2
3	Hong Kong	3	1	0	2	43	61	-18	2
4	Thailand	3	1	0	2	37	95	-58	2

18 November 1974

Japan XV	20–7	South Korea

Colombo

18 November 1974

Thailand	22–6	Hong Kong

Colombo

20 November 1974

Japan XV	46–6	Thailand

Colombo

20 November 1974

Hong Kong	19–9	South Korea

Colombo

22 November 1974

Japan XV	30–18	Hong Kong

Colombo

22 November 1974

South Korea	43–9	Thailand

Colombo

- Results

Nov 18
Nov 20
Nov 22

=== Pool B ===
Place	Nation	Games				Points			Table points
Place	Nation	played	won	drawn	lost	for	against	difference	Table points
1	Sri Lanka	3	3	0	0	61	13	48	6
2	Singapore	3	2	0	1	46	29	17	4
3	Malaysia	3	1	0	2	38	26	12	2
4	Laos	3	0	0	3	20	97	-77	0

17 November 1974

Malaysia	31–10	Laos

Colombo

17 November 1974

Sri Lanka	10–4	Singapore

Colombo

19 November 1974

Malaysia	9–7	Singapore

Colombo

19 November 1974

Sri Lanka	39–3	Laos

Colombo

21 November 1974

Singapore	27–7	Laos

Colombo

21 November 1974

Sri Lanka	12–6	Malaysia

Colombo

- Results

Sri Lanka
Malaysia
Laos
Singapore

== Finals ==
=== Third Place Final ===
23 November 1974

South Korea	41–0	Malaysia

Colombo

=== First Place Final ===
23 November 1974

Japan XV	44–6	Sri Lanka
Try: 4

Colombo

- Results

== Final standings ==
Rank	Team	Record
1st place, gold medalist(s)	Japan	4–0–0
2nd place, silver medalist(s)	Sri Lanka	3–0–1
3rd place, bronze medalist(s)	South Korea	2–0–2
4	Malaysia	1–0–3
