= 1980 ARFU Asian Rugby Championship =

1980 Asian Rugby Championship
Tournament details
- Host: Taiwan
- Date: 9–16 November 1980
- Countries: 8

Final positions
- Champions: Japan (7th title)

Tournament statistics
- Matches played: 14

The 1980 ARFU Asian Rugby Championship was the 7th edition of the tournament, and was played in Taipei. The 8 teams were divided in two pool, with final between the winner of both of them. Japan won the tournament.

== Tournament ==
=== Pool A ===
Place	Nation	Games				Points			Table points
Place	Nation	played	won	drawn	lost	for	against	difference	Table points
1	South Korea	3	2	1	0	60	33	27	5
2	Taiwan	3	2	0	1	77	45	32	4
3	Thailand	3	1	1	1	61	45	16	3
4	Singapore	3	0	0	3	25	100	-75	0

9 November 1980

South Korea	28–12	Singapore

Taipei

9 November 1980

Taiwan	26–19	Thailand

Taipei

11 November 1980

Thailand	30–7	Singapore

Taipei

11 November 1980

South Korea	20–9	Taiwan

Taipei

13 November 1980

South Korea	12–12	Thailand

Taipei

13 November 1980

Taiwan	42–6	Singapore

Taipei

=== Pool B ===
Place	Nation	Games				Points			Table points
Place	Nation	played	won	drawn	lost	for	against	difference	Table points
1	Japan	3	3	0	0	244	9	235	6
2	Hong Kong	3	2	0	1	205	51	154	4
3	Malaysia	3	1	0	2	18	186	-168	2
4	Sri Lanka	3	0	0	3	4	225	-221	0

9 November 1980

Japan XV	91–3	Malaysia

Taipei

9 November 1980

Hong Kong	108–0	Sri Lanka

Taipei

11 November 1980

Hong Kong	91–6	Malaysia

Taipei

11 November 1980

Japan XV	108–0	Sri Lanka

Taipei

13 November 1980

Japan XV	45–6	Hong Kong

Taipei

13 November 1980

Malaysia	9–4	Sri Lanka

Taipei

=== Finals ===
==== Third Place Final ====
16 November 1980

Hong Kong	26–0	Taiwan

Taipei

==== First Place Final ====
16 November 1980

Japan	21–12	South Korea

Taipei

== See also ==
- List of sporting events in Taiwan
