= 1972 ARFU Asian Rugby Championship =

1972 Asian Rugby Championship
Tournament details
- Host: Hong Kong
- Date: 4–11 November 1972
- Countries: 7

Final positions
- Champions: Japan (3rd title)

Tournament statistics
- Matches played: 12

The 1972 ARFU Asian Rugby Championship was the 3rd edition of the tournament, and it was played in Hong Kong. Taiwan was supposed to participate, but the government of Hong Kong refused the entrance of the Taiwan national team for the friendly relation with the People's Republic of China. The seven teams were divided into two pools, with the final between the winner of each pool. Japan won the tournament.

== Tournament ==
=== Pool A ===
Place	Nation	Games				Points			Table points
Place	Nation	played	won	drawn	lost	for	against	difference	Table points
1	Japan	3	3	0	0	151	4	147	6
2	Singapore	3	2	0	1	39	79	-40	4
3	Sri Lanka	3	1	0	2	29	69	-40	2
4	Malaysia	3	0	0	3	22	89	-67	0

4 November 1972

Japan XV	60–4	Singapore

Hong Kong

4 November 1972

Sri Lanka	23–9	Malaysia

Hong Kong

6 November 1972

Singapore	26–13	Malaysia

Hong Kong

6 November 1972

Japan XV	51–0	Sri Lanka

Hong Kong

8 November 1972

Japan XV	40–0	Malaysia

Hong Kong

8 November 1972

Singapore	9–6	Sri Lanka

Hong Kong

- Results

Nov 4
Nov 6
Nov 8

=== Pool B ===
Place	Nation	Games				Points			Table points
Place	Nation	played	won	drawn	lost	for	against	difference	Table points
1	Hong Kong	2	2	0	0	35	6	29	4
2	Thailand	2	1	0	1	13	29	-16	2
3	South Korea	2	0	0	2	18	31	-13	0

5 November 1972

South Korea	12–13	Thailand

Hong Kong

7 November 1972

Hong Kong	18–6	South Korea

Hong Kong

9 November 1972

Hong Kong	17–0	Thailand

Hong Kong

- Results

Nov 5
Nov 7
Nov 9

== Finals ==
=== Fifth Place Final ===
10 November 1972

South Korea	37–0	Sri Lanka

Hong Kong

=== Third Place Final ===
11 November 1972

Singapore	3–26	Thailand

Hong Kong

=== First Place Final ===
11 November 1972

Japan	16–0	Hong Kong
	Report

Hong Kong

- Results

5th place
3rd place
Final

== Final standings ==
Rank	Team	Record
1st place, gold medalist(s)	Japan	4–0–0
2nd place, silver medalist(s)	Hong Kong	2–0–1
3rd place, bronze medalist(s)	Thailand	2–0–1
4	Singapore	2–0–2
5	South Korea	1–0–2
6	Sri Lanka	1–0–3
7	Malaysia	0–0–3
