= 1992 ARFU Asian Rugby Championship =

1992 Asian Rugby Championship
Tournament details
- Host: South Korea
- Date: 19–26 September 1992
- Countries: 8

Final positions
- Champions: Japan (9th title)

Tournament statistics
- Matches played: 14

The 1992 ARFU Asian Rugby Championship was the 13th edition of the tournament, and was played in Seoul. The 8 teams were divided in two pool, with final between the winner of both of them. Japan won the tournament.

== Tournament ==
=== Pool 1 ===
Place	Nation	Games				Points			Table points
Place	Nation	played	won	drawn	lost	for	against	difference	Table points
1	Japan	3	3	0	0	225	12	213	6
2	Taiwan	3	2	0	1	107	35	72	4
3	Sri Lanka	3	1	0	2	27	124	-97	2
4	Singapore	3	0	0	3	13	201	-188	0

20 September 1992

Japan XV	120–3	Singapore

Seoul

20 September 1992

Taiwan	35–9	Sri Lanka

Seoul

22 September 1992

Japan XV	89–3	Sri Lanka

Seoul

22 September 1992

Taiwan	66–10	Singapore

Seoul

24 September 1992

Japan XV	16–6	Taiwan

Seoul

24 September 1992

Sri Lanka	15–0	Singapore

Seoul

=== Pool 2 ===
Place	Nation	Games				Points			Table points
Place	Nation	played	won	drawn	lost	for	against	difference	Table points
1	Hong Kong	3	3	0	0	147	29	118	6
2	South Korea	3	2	0	1	245	32	213	4
3	Thailand	3	1	0	2	75	154	-79	2
4	Malaysia	3	0	0	3	12	264	-252	0

19 September 1992

Thailand	53–6	Malaysia

Seoul

19 September 1992

Hong Kong	20–13	South Korea

Seoul

21 September 1992

South Korea	97–9	Thailand

Seoul

21 September 1992

Hong Kong	76–3	Malaysia

Seoul

23 September 1992

South Korea	135–3	Malaysia

Seoul

23 September 1992

Hong Kong	51–13	Thailand

Seoul

=== Finals ===
==== Third Place Final ====
26 September 1992

South Korea	59–17	Taiwan

Seoul

==== First Place Final ====
26 September 1992

Japan	37–9	Hong Kong

Seoul
