= 1988 ARFU Asian Rugby Championship =

1988 Asian Rugby Championship
Tournament details
- Host: Hong Kong
- Date: 13–19 November 1988
- Countries: 8

Final positions
- Champions: South Korea (3rd title)

Tournament statistics
- Matches played: 14

The 1988 ARFU Asian Rugby Championship was the 11th edition of the tournament, and was played in Hong Kong. The 8 teams were divided in two pool, with final between the winner of both of them. South Korea won the tournament.

== Tournament ==
=== Pool 1 ===
Place	Nation	Games				Points			Table points
Place	Nation	played	won	drawn	lost	for	against	difference	Table points
1	Japan	3	3	0	0	210	26	184	6
2	Taiwan	3	2	0	1	137	32	105	4
3	Thailand	3	1	0	2	33	143	-110	2
4	Singapore	3	0	0	3	6	185	-179	0

13 November 1988

Japan XV	82–0	Singapore

Hong Kong

13 November 1988

Taiwan	32–9	Thailand

Hong Kong

15 November 1988

Japan XV	108–7	Thailand

Hong Kong

15 November 1988

Taiwan	86–3	Singapore

Hong Kong

17 November 1988

Japan XV	20–19	Taiwan

Hong Kong

17 November 1988

Thailand	17–3	Singapore

Hong Kong

=== Pool 2 ===
Place	Nation	Games				Points			Table points
Place	Nation	played	won	drawn	lost	for	against	difference	Table points
1	South Korea	3	3	0	0	209	25	184	6
2	Hong Kong	3	2	0	1	114	42	72	4
3	Sri Lanka	3	1	0	2	21	119	-98	2
4	Malaysia	3	0	0	3	6	164	-158	0

12 November 1988

South Korea	102–0	Malaysia

Hong Kong

12 November 1988

Hong Kong	45–3	Sri Lanka

Hong Kong

14 November 1988

South Korea	39–19	Hong Kong

Hong Kong

14 November 1988

Sri Lanka	12–6	Malaysia

Hong Kong

16 November 1988

South Korea	68–6	Sri Lanka

Hong Kong

16 November 1988

Hong Kong	50–0	Malaysia

Hong Kong

=== Finals ===
==== Third Place Final ====
19 November 1988

Hong Kong	19–4	Taiwan

Hong Kong

==== First Place Final ====
19 November 1988

South Korea	17–13	Japan

Hong Kong
