= 1996 ARFU Asian Rugby Championship =

1996 Asian Rugby Championship
Tournament details
- Host: Taiwan
- Date: 2–9 November 1996
- Countries: 7

Final positions
- Champions: Japan (11th title)

Tournament statistics
- Matches played: 11

The 1996 ARFU Asian Rugby Championship was the 15th edition of the tournament, and was played in Taipei. The 8 teams were divided in two pools, with finals between the winners of each pool. Singapore withdrew and Japan won the tournament.

== Tournament ==
=== Pool 1 ===
Place	Nation	Games				Points			Table points
Place	Nation	played	won	drawn	lost	for	against	difference	Table points
1	Japan	2	2	0	0	242	22	220	4
2	Taiwan	2	1	0	1	65	116	-51	2
3	Thailand	2	0	0	2	25	194	-169	0

2 November 1996

Taiwan	53–15	Thailand

Taipei

4 November 1996

Japan XV	141–10	Thailand

Taipei

6 November 1996

Japan XV	101–12	Taiwan

Taipei

=== Pool 2 ===
Place	Nation	Games				Points			Table points
Place	Nation	played	won	drawn	lost	for	against	difference	Table points
1	South Korea	3	3	0	0	191	40	151	6
2	Hong Kong	3	2	0	1	184	37	147	4
3	Sri Lanka	3	1	0	2	64	132	-68	2
4	Malaysia	3	0	0	3	16	246	-230	0

3 November 1996

Hong Kong	103–5	Malaysia

Taipei

3 November 1996

South Korea	60–20	Sri Lanka

Taipei

5 November 1996

South Korea	112–5	Malaysia

Taipei

5 November 1996

Hong Kong	66–13	Sri Lanka

Taipei

7 November 1996

South Korea	19–15	Hong Kong

Taipei

7 November 1996

Sri Lanka	31–6	Malaysia

Taipei

=== Finals ===
==== Third Place Final ====
9 November 1996

Hong Kong	114–12	Taiwan

Taipei

==== First Place final ====
9 November 1996

Japan	41–25	South Korea

Taipei

== See also ==
- List of sporting events in Taiwan
