= Song Koon Poh =

Singaporean national rugby player

Song Koon Poh (born 1954) is a Singaporean former national rugby player who represented Singapore from 1972 to 1991. He captained the national team from 1976 to 1977, 1979–81 & 1984–87.

== Career ==
Song started playing rugby during his secondary school days in Victoria School. In 1978, Song won the Singapore national Sportsman of the Year award, remaining the only team player to have won the award.

Song was also the secretary for Singaporean rugby club, Blacks Rugby Football Club.

In June 1980, Song resigned his captaincy from the national rugby Union team and left the rugby scene.

In 1982, Song toured South Africa with Tokkie's Dragons. He was the only Asian picked to tour apartheid South Africa in an invitational "Rest of the World" team. After the tour, Song was banned for life by the Singapore Rugby Union for violating the Gleneagles Agreement.

In August 1983, Song was appointed the Singapore national rugby union team's caretaker coach till November.

On 1 January 1984, Song's ban was lifted by the Singapore Rugby Union. Later in August, he was selected to play for the national rugby team in the MRU Cup.

Post rugby, Song became a trader-broker in the petrol-chemical industry.
