= 2011 Cup of Nations (rugby union) =

2011 Cup of Nations Venue The Sevens, Dubai
- Countries: United Arab Emirates Kenya; Brazil Hong Kong
- Date: 10–16 December 2011
- Champions: Hong Kong (1st title)
- Runners-up: Kenya
- Matches played: 6

The 2011 Emirates Cup of Nations was held at The Sevens Stadium in Dubai as a season ending tournament for tier 3 teams from different continents. The four competing teams were hosts UAE, Asian 5 Nations rivals Hong Kong, 2011 Africa Cup champions Kenya and South American Rugby Championship A Division team Brazil.

The tournament was Brazil's first 15-a-side games outside of South America.

Hong Kong won the tournament, winning all three games with a bonus point (scoring 4 or more tries in a game). Kenya finished runners-up, courtesy of a last minute win over Brazil in their opening game.

== Format ==
The tournament is being played as a single round-robin, with the winner being the leading team after the third round of fixtures. The points for the tournament were awarded for: Win = 4 points Draw = 2 points Loss = 1 point Scoring 4 or more tries in one game = 1 bonus point Losing by 7 or less points = 1 bonus point.

== Fixtures and results ==
Place	Nation	Games				Points			Bonus points	Table points
Place	Nation	Played	Won	Drawn	Lost	For	Against	Difference	Bonus points	Table points
1	Hong Kong	3	3	0	0	153	34	119	3	15
2	Kenya	3	2	0	1	99	81	18	2	10
3	Brazil	3	1	0	2	94	67	27	3	7
4	United Arab Emirates	3	0	0	3	29	193	-164	0	0

10 December 2011
13:00 (UTC+04:00)

Brazil	25-27	Kenya
Try: (4 tries scored)		Try: (5 tries scored)

The Sevens, Dubai

10 December 2011
15:00 (UTC+04:00)

United Arab Emirates	14-72	Hong Kong
Try: (2 tries scored); Con: (2 conversions scored)		Try: Tom McQueen (2), Keith Robertson, Alex McQueen, Ed Haynes, Terence Montgomery, Rowan Varty, Cado Lee, Lee Jones, Tim Alexander, Alex Ng; Con: Alex McQueen (7); Pen: Alex McQueen

The Sevens

13 December 2011
18:00 (UTC+04:00)

Hong Kong	44-17	Kenya
Try: Mark Goosen, Rowan Varty, Charles French (2), Adam Raby, Paul Tauti; Con: Alex McQueen (4); Pen: Alex McQueen (2)		Try: Dennis Mwanja, Ronnie Mwenesi, (one further try - scorer unknown); Con: (1 conversion scored)

The Sevens

13 December 2011
20:00 (UTC+04:00)

United Arab Emirates	3-66	Brazil
Pen: (1 Penalty)		Try: Martín Schaefer, Juli, Nativo, Nick, Diegão, Croffi, Gregg (2), Pedrinho, Du; Con: Gregg (5); Pen: Gregg; Drop: Tanque

The Sevens

16 December 2011
15:00 (UTC+04:00)

United Arab Emirates	12-55	Kenya
Try: (2 tries scored); Con: (1 conversion scored)		Try: Vincent Mose (2), Vincent Ong'era, Brian Okwomi, Anthony Nyandigisi, Allan Omuka, Kevin Omiyo, David Ambunya; Con: Vincent Mose (7); Pen: Vincent Mose

The Sevens

16 December 2011
17:00 (UTC+04:00)

Hong Kong	37-3	Brazil
Try: Alex McQueen (3), Keith Robertson, Ally Maclay, Rowan Varty, Lee Jones; Con: Edward Haynes		Pen: Daniel Gregg

The Sevens

== See also ==
- 2011 Asian Five Nations
- 2012 Cup of Nations
