= 2015 Cup of Nations (rugby union) =

- Countries: Hong Kong Portugal; Russia Zimbabwe
- Date: 13–21 November 2015
- Champions: Russia (1st title)
- Runners-up: Hong Kong
- Matches played: 6

The 2015 Cup of Nations was the third Cup of Nations tournament, but the first held outside the United Arab Emirates. Unlike 2011 and 2012, the Cup of Nations was staged in Hong Kong at the Hong Kong Football Club Stadium from November 13 to 21. The tournament acted as a year ending tournament for tier 3 teams from different continents and provides greater preparation for teams to play in their regional competitions, especially this year participants who aim to qualify for the 2019 Rugby World Cup haven failed to qualify for the 2015 Rugby World Cup.

The four competing teams were hosts Hong Kong, who won the tournament in 2011, Zimbabwe who competed in 2012, while Portugal and Russia are new to the tournament having not competed in either of the 2015 World Rugby Tbilisi Cup or 2015 World Rugby Nations Cup.

== Format ==
The tournament is being played as a single round-robin, with the winner being the leading team after the third round of fixtures.

The points for the tournament were awarded for:

- Win = 4 points
- Draw = 2 points
- Loss = 1 point
- Scoring 4 or more tries in one game = 1 bonus point
- Losing by 7 or less points = 1 bonus point

== Standings ==
Place	Nation	Games				Points			Bonus points	Table points
Place	Nation	Played	Won	Drawn	Lost	For	Against	Difference	Bonus points	Table points
1	Russia (22)	3	3	0	0	104	29	+75	0	13
2	Hong Kong (24)	3	2	0	1	55	48	+7	0	9
3	Portugal (28)	3	1	0	2	54	47	+7	0	5
4	Zimbabwe (26)	3	0	0	3	27	116	-89	0	0

Pre-tournament rankings in parentheses

== Fixtures ==
=== Round 1 ===
13 November 2015
16:00 HKT (UTC+8)

Portugal	12-23	Russia
	Report

13 November 2015
19:00 HKT (UTC+8)

Hong Kong	30-11	Zimbabwe
	Report

=== Round 2 ===
17 November 2015
16:00 HKT (UTC+8)

Zimbabwe	5 - 50	Russia

17 November 2015
19:00 HKT (UTC+8)

Hong Kong	13 - 6	Portugal

=== Round 3 ===
21 November 2015
14:00 HKT (UTC+8)

Portugal	36 - 11	Zimbabwe

21 November 2015
17:00 HKT (UTC+8)

Hong Kong	12 - 31	Russia

== See also ==
- 2015 end-of-year rugby union internationals
