= Japan national rugby union team =

Rugby union team

Japan
- Nicknames: Cherry Blossoms; Brave Blossoms; Sakuras
- Emblem: Sakura
- Union: Japan Rugby Football Union
- Head coach: Eddie Jones
- Captain: Michael Leitch
- Most caps: Hitoshi Ono (98)
- Top scorer: Ayumu Goromaru (708)
- Top try scorer: Daisuke Ohata (69)
- Home stadium: Japan National Stadium; Chichibunomiya Stadium
First colours	Second colours

World Rugby ranking
- Current: 11 (as of 23 February 2026)
- Highest: 7 (2019)
- Lowest: 20 (2003, 2006)

First international
- Japan 9–8 Canada (Osaka, Japan; 31 January 1932)

Biggest win
- Japan 155–3 Chinese Taipei (Tokyo, Japan; 1 July 2002)

Biggest defeat
- New Zealand 145–17 Japan (Bloemfontein, South Africa; 4 June 1995)

World Cup
- Appearances: 11 (first in 1987)
- Best result: Quarter-finals (2019)
- Website: en.rugby-japan.jp (in English)

The Japan national rugby union team, also known as the Cherry Blossoms, the Brave Blossoms (Japanese: ブレイブ・ブロッサムズ, romanized: Bureibu burossamuzu), or simply Sakura, represents Japan in men's international rugby union. Japan is traditionally the strongest rugby union power in Asia and has experienced mixed results against non-Asian teams over the years. Rugby union in Japan is administered by the Japan Rugby Football Union (JRFU), which was founded in 1926. They compete annually in the Pacific Nations Cup (PNC) and previously in the Asia Rugby Championship (ARC). They have also participated in every Rugby World Cup (RWC) since the tournament began in 1987, and hosted the event in 2019.

Rugby was first played in Japan's treaty ports as early as 1866. Popular participation by local university teams was established in 1899 and Japan's first recorded international match was a match against a Canadian team in 1932. Notable games for Japan include a victory over the Junior All Blacks in 1968, and a narrow 6–3 loss to England in 1971. Famous wins by Japan include a 28–24 victory over a Scotland XV in 1989 and a 23–8 victory over Wales in 2013. In 2011, Japan displayed its progress by winning the 2011 IRB Pacific Nations Cup, played against Fiji, Samoa and Tonga. Further progress was displayed in 2014 when Japan completed a string of ten consecutive test wins (a record for a tier 2 team) to rank in the world's top 10 teams. This continued into 2015 where they produced the first of their three biggest upsets when, in a Rugby World Cup pool match against South Africa, they won 34–32.

In the years between, Japan faced quality opposition, playing relatively well with solid results including a tie against France, and a narrow loss to Wales at Cardiff. Their second shock win was a 19–12 defeat of world number-two ranked Ireland in a 2019 Rugby World Cup pool game. Emerging undefeated from the tournament's pool stage after a 28–21 victory over Scotland, Japan made their first-ever World Cup quarter-final appearance, going down 3–26 to eventual world champions South Africa.

== History ==
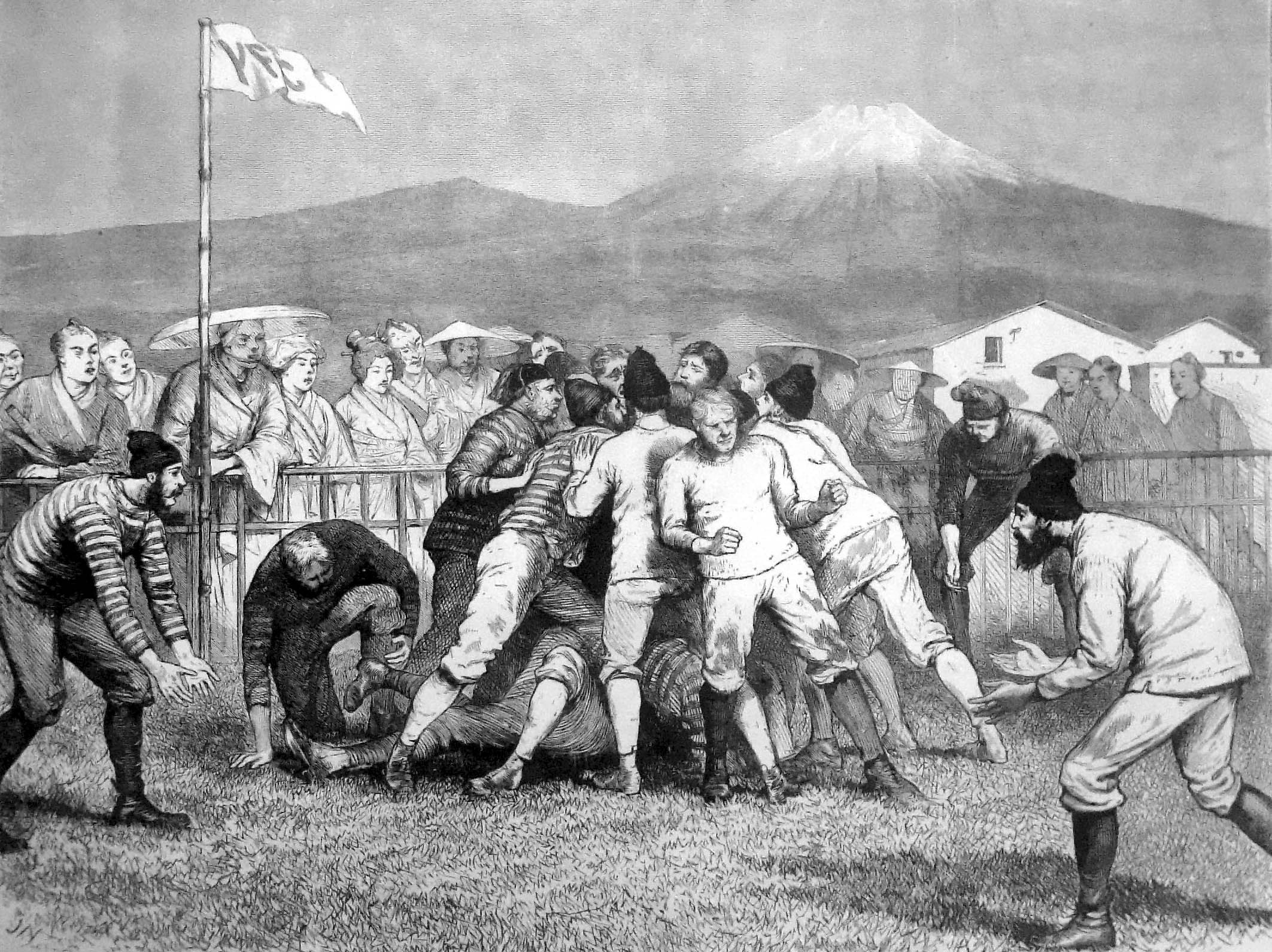
Rugby football game in Yokohama, 1874

The first recorded instance of a team being established and rugby being played in Japan was in 1866 with the founding of the Yokohama Foot Ball Club. Games, mainly between service personnel, were played on the Garrison Parade Ground in Yamate, Yokohama. In 1874 records also illustrate British sailors staging a game in Yokohama. Other games were played at other treaty ports such as Kobe between teams of long-term foreign residents and visiting ships' crews and garrisons, but they rarely involved Japanese players. The date of local Japanese participation in the sport is most frequently cited as 1899, when students at Keio University were introduced to the game by Professor Edward Bramwell Clarke and Ginnosuke Tanaka both graduates of Cambridge University.

The formation of a national team and effectively Japan's first international match took place in Osaka on 31 January 1932 when a trade delegation from Canada to Japan supported an overseas tour by the Canada national rugby union team. The Japanese won this first match 9–8. In a second test match in Tokyo 11 days later again the Japanese side beat the Canadians 38–5.

Japan beat the Junior All Blacks 23–19 in 1968 after losing the first four matches on a tour of New Zealand, but they won the last five. The Japanese (coached by Tetsunosuke Onishi, a professor of Waseda University) lost by just 3–6 to England in Tokyo on 29 September 1971 in the RFU's centenary year. The 1973 Japan rugby union tour of Wales, England and France was less successful with the side winning only two of their eleven matches, and losing the international matches against Wales and France. Ten years later Japan gave Wales a fright in losing by a slim five-point margin, 24–29, at Cardiff Arms Park on 2 October 1983.

On 28 May 1989, a strong Japan coached by Hiroaki Shukuzawa defeated an uncapped Scotland, missing nine British Lions on tour in Australia, for the first time at Chichibunomiya Rugby Stadium, 28–24. The Japan team included such Kobe Steel stalwarts as centre Seiji Hirao (captain), and locks Atsushi Oyagi and Toshiyuki Hayashi (38 Japan caps and a member of Oxford University's all-time best XV). Sinali Latu at No. 8 was then a fourth year student at Daito Bunka University, and speedy Yoshihito Yoshida on the wing (no. 14) was a third year at Meiji University. Scotland missed an incredible seven penalties and refused the kicking tee which was generously offered – as a surviving video of the game shows. It was almost the same Japanese team which defeated Zimbabwe in RWC1991.

=== Under Shogo Mukai (2001–2003) ===
After Hirao resigned, Toshiba Brave Lupus coach Shogo Mukai was appointed in March 2001 to lead Japan up to the 2003 Rugby World Cup. After mixed fortunes in his first two years in charge, Japan put in some impressive performances at the tournament with good efforts against Scotland and France, nevertheless they still left the tournament having failed to reach their target of winning some matches but still won admirers for their exciting brand of play. Mukai left his post after the tournament to spend more time with his family.

=== Under Mitsutake Hagimoto (2004–2005) ===
After Shogo Mukai left after the 2003 Rugby World Cup, the JRFU initially tried to appoint Eddie Jones from his post with Australia but were unsuccessful and instead appointed Mitsutake Hagimoto in March 2004 after he won the inaugural Top League with the Kobelco Steelers. Under Hagimoto, Japan decided they would not select foreign born players after Mukai had been criticised for playing too many at the World Cup.

Hagimoto's first match in charge was a disappointing draw with Korea, but his first few matches in charge after that were promising with wins over Russia and Canada to win the Super Powers Cup and pushed Italy close losing 32–19.

However, in November 2004, Japan went on a disastrous tour to Europe where they were embarrassingly thrashed 100–8 by Scotland and 98–0 by Wales and also were comfortably defeated by Romania. Japan's performances were described as "pathetic", and the squad was called "a joke" with some key players ignored or not given permission to travel.

This disastrous tour forced a rethink from Hagimoto and foreign born players were brought back into the side in 2005, but after losing twice to Ireland in June he was sacked and with just 5 wins from 15 matches was the least successful coach for Japan in the professional era.

=== Under Jean-Pierre Élissalde (2005–2006) ===
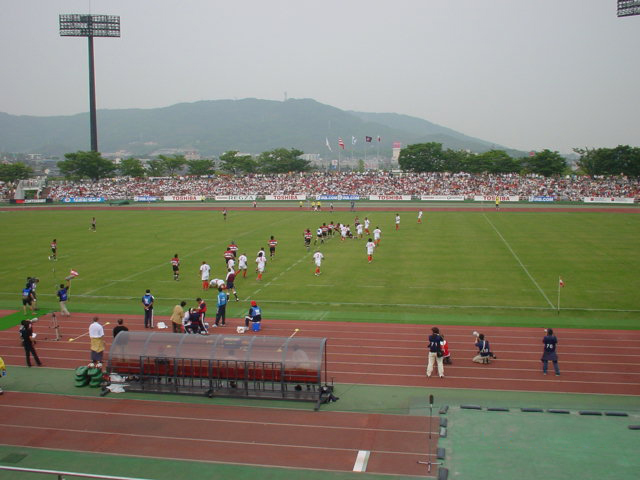
Japan play Tonga at Honjo stadium on 4 June 2006

After Hagimoto left his post at the end of June 2005, Jean-Pierre Élissalde who had been appointed backs coach three months earlier took full charge and became the first foreigner to be the head coach for Japan. His first match in charge was a 44–29 win over Spain in November 2005.

In 2006, despite a disappointing campaign in the inaugural Pacific Nations Cup in June where Japan lost all their matches, and also lost to heavily to Italy 52–6, Élissalde was backed to lead the side to the 2007 Rugby World Cup. But Élissalde was later sacked in September after he took on a job with Bayonne without consulting the JRFU and then refused to give up his job with them. Assistant coach Osamu Ota took over as caretaker coach for two Rugby World Cup qualifiers in November 2006.

=== Under John Kirwan (2007–2011) ===
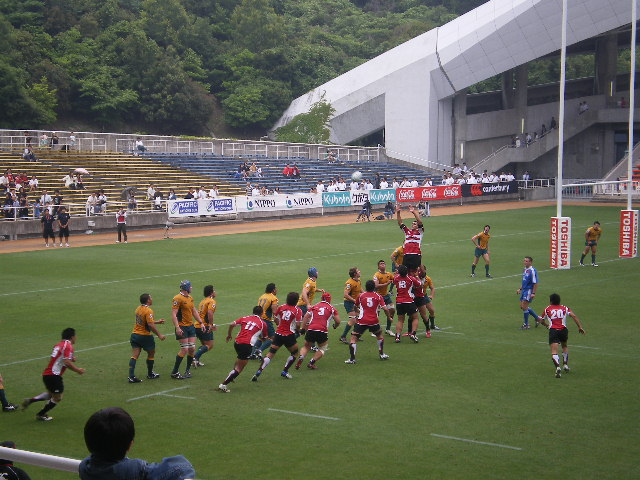
Japan plays Australia A on 8 June 2008

John Kirwan was appointed head coach on in October 2006 after Elissalde was sacked. He initially worked as an advisor to caretaker coach Osamu Ota before taking over the job completely in 2007.

After starting with large wins over the Asian opposition, Japan only won one of their remaining 10 fixtures in 2007, although in the 2007 Rugby World Cup they did gain a draw with a last minute touchline conversion from Shotaro Onishi against Canada to end a long losing streak of World Cup matches stretching back to 1991.

Results began to pick up after the 2007 World Cup and Kirwan led Japan up to a high of 13th in the IRB Rankings and to win their first ever Pacific Nations Cup title in 2011 after they beat Fiji away for the first ever time in Japan's history.

However, despite more positive results in between World Cups, Japan had a disappointing 2011 Rugby World Cup, losing 31–18 to Tonga who they had beaten four times in a row since 2008, and drawing again to Canada who they had beaten 46–8 and 27–6 in 2009, and Japan left the World Cup winless meaning they still had not won a match at the tournament since 1991. Kirwan came under pressure after the tournament and he resigned from his post after his contract came to the end at the end of the year.

The tenure of Kirwan as coach was notable for a large number of imports he selected. Players who originated from New Zealand such as James Arlidge, Bryce Robins, Shaun Webb, Ryan Nicholas, Luke Thompson or Tonga such as Alisi Tupuailei and Sione Vatuvei all featured prominently under Kirwan. The large percentage of foreigners in the national team also caused criticism for Kirwan. However, despite failing to bring Japan a World Cup win, Kirwan left his post as the most successful Japan coach of the professional era with a win rate of 58.18% from 55 matches.

=== Under Eddie Jones (2012–2015) ===
Kirwan chose not to renew his contract as head coach when it expired at the end of 2011, and the Japan Rugby Football Union announced that former Australia coach Eddie Jones would be his successor. Jones stated that his intention was to take the Japanese national team into the top 10 on the international rankings, and that they must develop a style of play to allow them to win games against teams such as Scotland.

Jones made his debut as Japan head coach against Kazakhstan. He had selected a total of 10 uncapped players out of the 22 selected players. They went on to win the match 87–0. They then had a big win over United Arab Emirates where young 18-year-old Yoshikazu Fujita set a new Asian Five Nations record for the most tries in a single match with a total of 6. This was also Fujita's international debut.

In 2013, Jones led Japan to their sixth consecutive championship win in the Asian Five Nations, where Japan achieved a tournament record score of 121–0 against the Philippines. In May, the nation lost their opening match of the 2013 IRB Pacific Nations Cup to Tonga, followed by a defeat to Fiji in the second round. Following these matches, Japan faced a 2-test series against Wales. Japan lost narrowly, 18–22, in the first test, but won the second test 23–8, and the series ended in a 1–1 draw. This was the first time that Japan had recorded a victory over the Welsh.

On 16 October 2013, Jones was hospitalised after having a suspected stroke and was released from hospital 2 days later on 18 October 2013. After his release from hospital, it was announced that Jones would miss Japan's 2013 end-of-year rugby union tests against New Zealand, Scotland, Gloucester, Russia and Spain, and former Australia skills coach and current technical adviser for Japan Scott Wisemantel would interim coach Japan for their 2013 end-of-year rugby union tests.

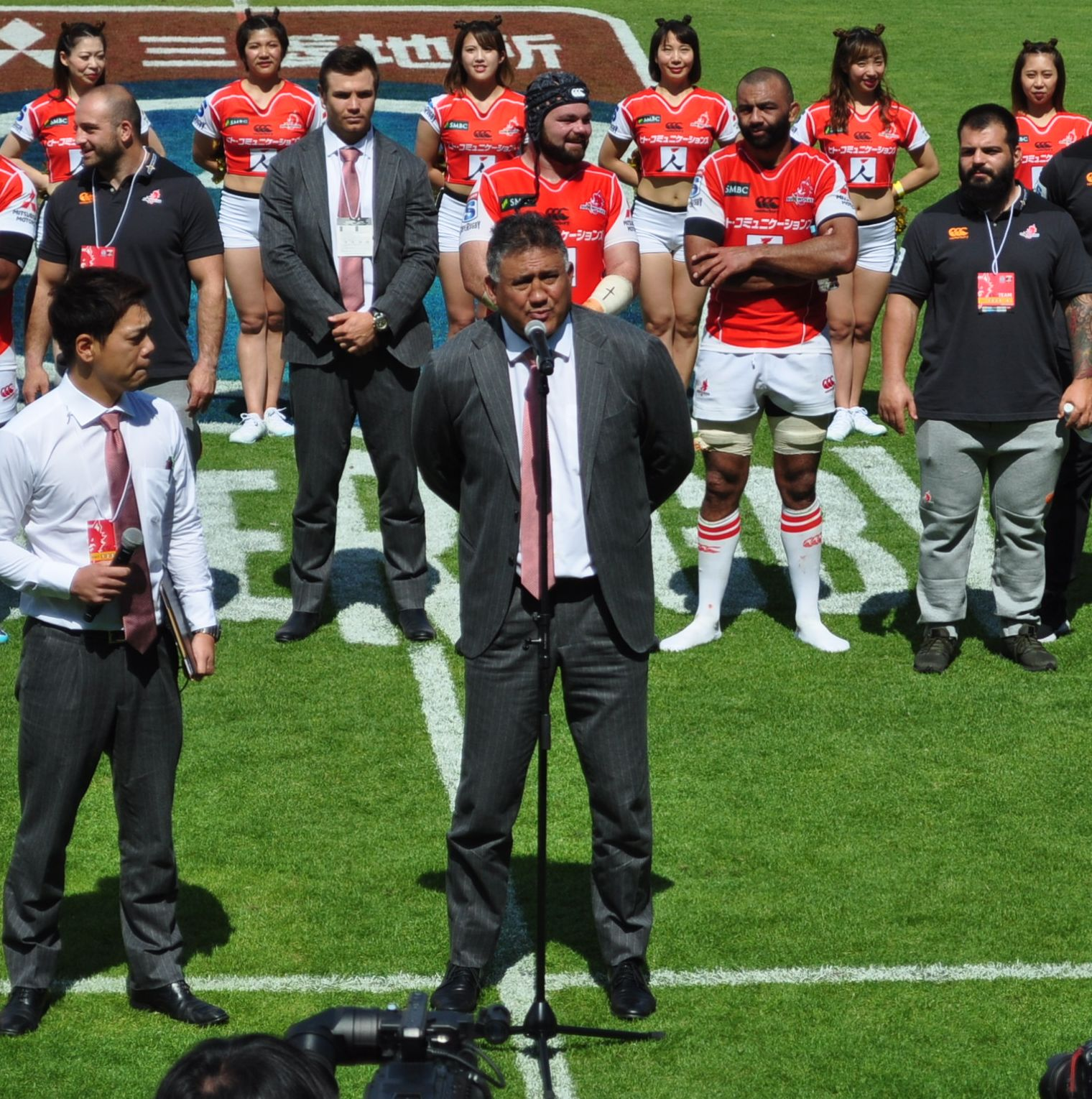
Jamie Joseph giving a speech at a Sunwolves match on 12 May 2018

On 19 September 2015, Japan stunned South Africa by a last minute try from Karne Hesketh to win 34–32 in their opening group pool game at the 2015 Rugby World Cup in Brighton, England. BBC reported the win as "arguably the biggest upset in rugby union history". In 2015, Japan became the first team in World Cup history to win three pool games but still be eliminated at the group stage, due to their heavy loss to Scotland.

=== Under Jamie Joseph (2016–2023) ===
Jamie Joseph, former coach of New Zealand's Highlanders Super Rugby team and the Māori All Blacks, took over as head coach for Japan (and the Sunwolves Super Rugby team) in 2016. In the 2017 Asia Rugby Championship, Japan sealed their twelfth consecutive Asia Rugby Championship, winning all four games. They went on to defeat Romania 33–21 in the 2017 June rugby union tests, but lost to Ireland 2–0, during their first test series since 2005, losing the first test 50–22 and the second 35–13. In November 2017, Joseph led his side to a single win and a draw in four games. They started their End-of-year series with two consecutive home losses, a 27–47 loss to a World XV side and a 30–63 loss to Australia. Japan's first win came against Tonga 39–6 in Toulouse, France, before going on to draw with France 23–23, which was the first time that these two nations had drawn with one another.

During the 2018 June tests, Joseph led Japan to a 1–all series draw with Italy, winning the first test 34–17, and losing the second 25–22. The team then beat Georgia 28–0 at the Toyota Stadium.

In 2019, Japan won the Pacific Nations Cup with wins against Fiji, Tonga and the United States, with no losses.

Japan hosted the Rugby World Cup in 2019, and the team repeated their feat of a shock win in Brighton at the 2015 World Cup, this time beating world No. 2-ranked Ireland 19–12 at Shizuoka Stadium in Fukuroi, Shizuoka They reached the quarter-finals for the first time in the team's history after beating Scotland 28–21 at the International Stadium Yokohama in Yokohama that was battered by Typhoon Hagibis only the night before.

== Kits ==
Japan traditionally plays with white and red hooped shirts (with white collar and cuffs) with a Sakura embroidered on the chest, paired with white shorts and white socks with red splashes. Between 2003 and 2011, the shirt was predominantly red with two white parallel hoops on the chest with white accents, sometimes with black or navy socks and shorts.

Since its first test against Canada in 1930, Japan played with the traditional hooped red and white shirts, the emblem on the shirt originally depicted the Sakura as "bud, half-open and full-bloomed". The current version of the emblem, depicting three full-bloomed Sakura, was dated 1952, when Japan played against Oxford University XV at Hanazono, Higashiosaka, on 1 October 1952.

On 4 July 2019 the Japan Rugby Football Union on Thursday unveiled the national team's jersey for this year's Rugby World Cup, the shirt featuring a samurai helmet motif representing the tradition of Japan's warrior spirit. The combination of Samurai and Sakura (Cherry Blossom) has long been linked in Japanese culture.

The away kit usually consist of a navy blue uniform, white or navy shorts and navy blue socks, sometimes with white collar or panels, or black. The kit supplier since 1997 is Canterbury. Before that, the kits were manufactured by Japanese company Sceptre between 1987 and 1995 and in 1982, by Suzuki Sports. Currently, the jersey sponsors are Lipovitan D (in the front) and Toshiba (in the back). Previously, between 1997 and 2001, the shirt sponsor was Japan Telecom.

=== Kit suppliers ===
Period	Kit manufacturer
1982	Suzuki Sports
1987–1995	Sceptre
1997–present	Canterbury

=== Home kit ===
1960s–2002	2003–2006	2007–2009	2011–2014
2015–2018	2019–2023	2023–24

=== Away kit ===
1960s–2002	2003–2006	2007–2009	2011–2014
2015–2018	2019–2023	2023–present

== List of matches ==
=== Wins against Tier 1 nations ===
3 June 1968	Junior All Blacks	19–23	Japan	(New Zealand) Athletic Park, Wellington
	Try: Mike O'Callaghan ??? (2); Con: ??? (2); Pen: ??? (2)		Try: Yoshihiro Sakata (4); Akira Yokoi; Tadayuki Ito; Con: Tsutomu Katsuraguchi; Pen: Tsutomu Katsuraguchi	Attendance: 25,000; Referee: RC Fenton

28 May 1989	Japan	28–24	Scotland XV	(Japan) Chichibunomiya Rugby Stadium, Tokyo

15 September 1998	Japan	44–29	Argentina	(Japan) Chichibunomiya Rugby Stadium, Tokyo
	Try: McCormick; Ohata; Watanabe (2); Con: Murata (3); Pen: Murata (4); Drop: Ken Iwabuchi (2)	Report	Try: Corleto; Ledesma; Martín; Pfister; Con: Fuselli; Lobrauco; Drop: Fuselli	Attendance: 20,000; Referee: Giovanni Morandin (Italy)

13 July 2011	Fiji	13-24	Japan	(Fiji) Churchill Park, Lautoka, Lautoka
15:10 Fiji time				Attendance: 3,000

15 June 2013	Japan	23–8	Wales	(Japan) Chichibunomiya Rugby Stadium, Tokyo
14:00 JST (UTC+9)	Try: Wing 49' c Broadhurst 60' c Con: Goromaru (2/2) 49', 61'; Pen: Goromaru (3/3) 14', 34', 76'	Report	Try: Prydie 44' m Pen: Biggar (1/2) 21'	Attendance: 21,062; Referee: Greg Garner (England)

21 June 2014	Japan	26–23	Italy	(Japan) Chichibunomiya Rugby Stadium, Tokyo
14:00 JST (UTC+09)	Try: Yamada 4' c Sa'u 59' c Con: Goromaru (2/2) 5', 60'; Pen: Goromaru (4/5) 13', 22', 42', 48'	Report (In Italian)	Try: Penalty try 17' c Barbieri 74' c Con: Orquera (1/1) 17'; Allan (1/1) 75'; Pen: Orquera (3/3) 7', 35', 52'	Attendance: 13,816; Referee: Jaco Peyper (South Africa)

19 September 2015	South Africa	32–34	Japan	(England) Falmer Stadium, Brighton
16:45	Try: Louw 18' c B. Du Plessis 33' m De Jager 44' c Strauss 62' c Con: Lambie (2/3) 19', 45'; Pollard (1/1) 63'; Pen: Lambie (1/1) 54'; Pollard (1/1) 73'		Try: Leitch 30' c Goromaru 69' c Hesketh 80' m Con: Goromaru (2/3) 31', 70'; Pen: Goromaru (5/6) 8', 43', 49', 53', 60'	Attendance: 29,290; Referee: Jérôme Garcès (France)

9 June 2018	Japan	34–17	Italy	(Japan) Oita Bank Dome, Oita
14:45 JST (UTC+09)	Try: Mafi 17' c Fukuoka 27' c Lemeki 60' c Matsushima 65' c Con: Tamura (4/4) 19', 29', 62', 67'; Pen: Tamura (2/3) 33', 57'		Try: Pasquali 14' c Steyn 35' c Con: Allan (2/2) 16', 37'; Pen: Allan (1/1) 51'	Attendance: 25,824; Referee: Nic Berry (Australia)

27 July 2019	Japan	34-21	Fiji	(Japan) Kamaishi Recovery Memorial Stadium, Kamaishi
14:50 JST (UTC+09)				Attendance: 13,135

28 September 2019	Japan	19–12	Ireland	(Japan) Shizuoka Stadium, Fukuroi
16:15 JST (UTC+09)	Try: Fukuoka 59' c Con: Tamura (1/1) 61'; Pen: Tamura (4/6) 18', 34', 40', 72'		Try: Ringrose 14' m Rob Kearney 21' c Con: Carty (1/2) 22'	Attendance: 47,813; Referee: Angus Gardner (Australia)

13 October 2019	Japan	28–21	Scotland	(Japan) International Stadium Yokohama, Yokohama
16:15 JST (UTC+09)	Try: Matsushima 18' c Inagaki 26' c Fukuoka (2) 40' c, 43' c Con: Tamura (4/4) 20', 27', 40+2', 44'	Report	Try: Russell 7' c Nel 50' c Fagerson 55' c Con: Laidlaw (2/2) 8', 51'; Russell (1/1) 56'	Attendance: 67,666; Referee: Ben O'Keeffe (New Zealand)

5 July 2025	Japan	24–19	Wales	(Japan) Mikuni World Stadium, Kitakyushu
14:00 JST (UTC+09)	Try: Matsunaga 16' c Nakakusu 59' c Vailea 70' c Con: Seung-sin (3/3) 17', 60', 71'; Pen: Seung-sin (1/1) 64'	Report	Try: Thomas 4' c Penalty try 20'; Rogers 22' m Con: Costelow (1/2) 5'	Attendance: 13,487; Referee: Damian Schneider (Argentina)

4 July 2026	Japan	27–10	Italy	(Japan) Chichibunomiya Rugby Stadium, Tokyo
17:40 JST (UTC+9)	Try: Dearns 10' c Matsunaga 16' c Gunter 46' c Con: Matsunaga (3/3) 11', 16', 47'; Pen: Matsunaga (2/2) 24', 66'	Report	Try: Brex 4' c Con: Garbisi (1/1) 5'; Pen: Garbisi (1/1) 43'	Attendance: 21,329; Referee: Nic Berry (Australia)

Additionally, Japan tied France 23–23 in Paris, 25 November 2017.

- Official Japan Schedules
- Official Japan Results

=== Overall ===
Men's World Rugby Rankings Top 20 as of 16 November 2026
Rank	Change (Note: Change from the previous week)	Team	Points
1	Steady	South Africa	91.53
2	Steady	New Zealand	90.65
3	▲1	France	89.05
4	▼1	Ireland	88.70
5	Steady	England	86.99
6	Steady	Scotland	85.28
7	Steady	Australia	82.24
8	Steady	Argentina	82.09
9	▲1	Wales	79.37
10	▼1	Fiji	77.79
11	Steady	Italy	75.84
12	Steady	Japan	75.25
13	Steady	Georgia	74.23
14	▲1	United States	68.39
15	▼1	Portugal	68.24
16	▲3	Samoa	67.60
17	▲1	Chile	67.00
18	▼2	Spain	66.53
19	▼2	Tonga	65.58
20	Steady	Uruguay	65.17

Japan's historical rankings

Source: World Rugby
Graph updated to 16 November 2026

Below is table of the representative rugby matches played by a Japan national XV to 15 November 2026.

Opponent	Played	Won	Lost	Drawn	Win %	For	Aga	Diff
Arabian Gulf	3	3	0	0	100.0%	256	20	+236
Argentina	7	1	6	0	16.67%	186	298	−112
Australia	9	0	9	0	0.0%	175	425	−250
Australia A	4	0	4	0	0.0%	51	242	−191
(Australia) Australian Universities	6	2	4	0	33.33%	60	90	−30
(Australia) Emerging Wallabies	2	1	0	1	50%	41	39	+2
British & Irish Lions	1	0	1	0	0.0%	10	28	-18
Canada	27	17	8	2	62.96%	724	624	+100
(Canada) British Columbia Bears	6	2	2	2	33.33%	103	82	+21
Chile	1	1	0	0	100%	42	12	+30
Chinese Taipei	4	4	0	0	100%	474	27	+447
England	7	0	7	0	0.0%	93	370	−277
England XV	5	0	5	0	0.0%	71	131	−60
England A	3	0	3	0	0.0%	35	147	−112
England Students	1	0	1	0	0.0%	0	43	−43
England Under-23's	2	0	2	0	0.0%	25	77	−52
(England) Cambridge University	4	1	3	0	25%	52	110	−58
(England) Oxford University	4	0	4	0	0.0%	28	130	−102
(England) Oxford and Cambridge	3	0	3	0	0.0%	30	113	−83
Fiji	21	4	17	0	19.05%	402	597	−195
France	8	0	7	1	0.0%	158	300	−142
France XV	6	0	6	0	0.0%	31	272	−241
Georgia	8	6	2	0	75%	198	144	+52
Hong Kong	28	24	4	0	85.71%	1175	370	+805
Ireland	12	1	11	0	8.33%	203	524	−321
Ireland XV	2	0	2	0	0.0%	28	81	−53
Ireland Students	1	0	1	0	0.0%	12	24	−12
Italy	11	3	8	0	27.27%	208	335	−127
Kazakhstan	5	5	0	0	100%	418	23	+395
South Korea	36	29	6	1	80.56%	1614	517	+1097
Netherlands	1	0	1	0	0.0%	13	15	−2
New Zealand	6	0	6	0	0.0%	111	453	−342
New Zealand XV	2	0	2	0	0.0%	4	180	−176
Junior All Blacks	8	1	7	0	12.5%	98	337	−239
Māori	1	0	1	0	0.0%	22	65	−43
New Zealand Universities	15	2	11	2	13.33%	221	417	−196
Philippines	2	2	0	0	100%	220	10	+210
Portugal	1	1	0	0	100%	38	25	+13
(Australia) Queensland Reds	1	0	1	0	0.0%	6	42	−36
Romania	6	5	1	0	83.33%	152	119	+33
Russia	7	6	1	0	85.71%	299	127	+172
Samoa	19	7	12	0	36.84%	410	574	−164
Scotland	9	1	8	0	11.11%	132	363	−231
Scotland XV	4	1	3	0	25%	64	165	−101
Singapore	1	1	0	0	100%	45	15	+30
South Africa	4	1	3	0	25%	51	160	−109
Spain	3	3	0	0	100%	114	43	+71
Sri Lanka	3	3	0	0	100%	266	29	+237
Thailand	1	1	0	0	100%	42	11	+31
Tonga	20	11	9	0	55%	542	493	+49
United Arab Emirates	3	3	0	0	100%	310	6	+304
United States	26	12	13	1	46.15%	648	720	−72
Uruguay	6	5	1	0	83.33%	201	74	+127
Wales	14	2	12	0	14.28%	249	628	−379
Wales XV	4	0	4	0	0.0%	56	229	−173
(Wales) Welsh Clubs	1	0	1	0	0.0%	9	63	−54
Zimbabwe	1	1	0	0	100%	52	8	+44
Total	406	173	223	10	42.61%	11,278	11,466	−188

== Coaches ==
As of 1 August 2026.

Name	Years	Tests	Won	Lost	Draw	Win %
Shigeru Kayama	1930−1934	5	3	1	1	60.0%
Chuji Kitajima	1936, 1956	5	0	4	1	0.0%
Takenosuke Okumura	1952−1953	4	0	4	0	0.0%
Kozo Nishino	1958	3	0	3	0	0.0%
Tomoo Chiba	1959	2	0	1	1	0.0%
Masao Wada	1959	2	0	2	0	0.0%
Yasujiro Kasai	1963	1	1	0	0	100%
Tetsunosuke Onishi	1966−1971	12	4	8	0	33.3%
Hitoshi Oka	1972, 1975, 1985−1986	16	3	12	1	18.8%
Akira Yokoi	1972, 1976, 1978−1979	9	1	7	1	11.1%
Ryo Saito	1974, 1976−1978, 1980−1981	15	3	11	1	20.0%
Hiroshi Hibino	1976, 1982−1984, 1987−1988	17	4	13	0	23.5%
Katsumi Miyaji	1978, 1984, 1987	5	2	3	0	40.0%
Ryozo Imazato	1979	1	0	1	0	0.0%
Iwao Yamamoto	1980, 1982, 1996	10	5	5	0	50.0%
Hiroaki Shukuzawa	1989−1991	14	5	9	0	35.7%
Osamu Koyabu	1992−1995	14	6	8	0	42.9%
Seiji Hirao	1997−2000	33	13	20	0	39.4%
Shogo Mukai	2001−2003	24	9	15	0	37.5%
Mitsutake Hagimoto	2004−2005	15	5	9	1	33.3%
Jean-Pierre Élissalde	2005−2006	9	4	5	0	44.4%
Osamu Ota	2006 (Caretaker)	2	2	0	0	100%
John Kirwan	2007−2011	55	31	22	2	56.4%
Eddie Jones	2012−2015	44	33	11	0	75.0%
Scott Wisemantel	2013 (Caretaker)	4	2	2	0	50.0%
Ryuji Nakatake	2016 (Interim)	4	4	0	0	100%
Mark Hammett	2016 (Interim)	3	1	2	0	33.3%
Jamie Joseph	2016−2023	50	23	26	1	46.0%
Eddie Jones	2024–	25	10	15	0	40%

=== Award winners ===
The following Japan head coaches have been recognised at the World Rugby Awards since 2001:

World Rugby Coach of the Year
Year	Nominees	Winners
2015	(Australia) Eddie Jones	—
2019	(New Zealand) (Japan) Jamie Joseph	—

== Current squad ==
On 3 November, Japan named a 36-player squad ahead of the 2026 Nations Championship Northern Hemisphere Series.

- Caps updated: 14 November 2026 (after England v Japan)

Head Coach: Eddie Jones

Player	Position	Date of birth (age)	Caps	Club/province
Mamoru Harada	Hooker	15 April 1999 (age 27)	22	(Japan) Toshiba Brave Lupus Tokyo
Kenji Sato	Hooker	4 January 2003 (age 23)	15	(Japan) Saitama Wild Knights
Opeti Helu	Prop	22 July 1998 (age 28)	4	(France) Lyon
Kanato Hirano	Prop	8 February 2000 (age 26)	1	(Japan) Tochigi Honda Heat
Ryosuke Iwaihara	Prop	6 October 1996 (age 30)	5	(Japan) Tochigi Honda Heat
Yota Kamimori	Prop	26 April 1994 (age 32)	5	(Japan) Kubota Spears
Sena Kimura	Prop	24 June 1999 (age 27)	5	(Japan) Toshiba Brave Lupus Musashi
Sojiro Otsuka	Prop	5 July 2004 (age 22)	11	(Japan) Kwansei Gakuin University
Shuhei Takeuchi	Prop	9 December 1997 (age 28)	33	(Japan) Tokyo Sungoliath
Keijiro Tamefusa	Prop	3 September 2001 (age 25)	25	(Japan) Kubota Spears
Ruan Botha	Lock	10 January 1992 (age 34)	1	(Japan) Kubota Spears
Jack Cornelsen	Lock	13 October 1994 (age 32)	40	(Japan) Saitama Wild Knights
Warner Dearns	Lock	11 April 2002 (age 24)	40	(Japan) Toshiba Brave Lupus Tokyo
Harry Hockings	Lock	28 July 1998 (age 28)	12	(Japan) Tokyo Sungoliath
Michael Stolberg	Lock	27 March 1992 (age 34)	9	(Japan) Toshiba Brave Lupus Tokyo
Tiennan Costley	Back row	14 June 2000 (age 26)	21	(Japan) Kobe Steelers
Ben Gunter	Back row	24 October 1997 (age 29)	28	(Japan) Saitama Wild Knights
Esei Ha'angana	Back row	21 April 1999 (age 27)	5	(Japan) Urayasu D-Rocks
Miu Austin Moriyama	Back row	23 September 2003 (age 23)	0	(Japan) Urayasu D-Rocks
Kanji Shimokawa	Back row	17 January 1999 (age 27)	32	(Japan) Tokyo Sungoliath
Shinobu Fujiwara	Scrum-half	8 February 1999 (age 27)	23	(Japan) Kubota Spears
Kenta Fukuda	Scrum-half	19 December 1996 (age 29)	10	(Japan) Tochigi Honda Heat
Naoto Saitō	Scrum-half	26 August 1997 (age 29)	39	(Japan) Tokyo Sungoliath
Riku Kitahara	Fly-half	30 March 1999 (age 27)	2	(Japan) Tochigi Honda Heat
Shinya Komura	Fly-half	28 May 2002 (age 24)	5	(Japan) Toyota Verblitz
Yuki Ikeda	Centre	21 May 1995 (age 31)	2	(Japan) Black Rams Tokyo
Charlie Lawrence	Centre	27 May 1998 (age 28)	10	(Japan) Sagamihara Dynaboars
Chisu Lee	Centre	6 November 2004 (age 22)	3	(South Korea) Korea University
Dylan Riley	Centre	2 May 1997 (age 29)	48	(Japan) Saitama Wild Knights
Samisoni Tua	Centre	24 May 1995 (age 31)	11	(Japan) Urayasu D-Rocks
Inoke Burua	Wing	30 May 1999 (age 27)	5	(Japan) Kobe Steelers
Kippei Ishida	Wing	28 April 2000 (age 26)	13	(Japan) Yokohama Canon Eagles
Koga Nezuka	Wing	15 September 1998 (age 28)	3	(Japan) Kubota Spears
Riku Tokito	Wing	10 July 2003 (age 23)	1	(Japan) Toshiba Brave Lupus Musashi
Kazuma Ueda	Wing	4 December 2002 (age 23)	11	(Japan) Kobe Steelers
Takuro Matsunaga	Fullback	13 August 1998 (age 28)	12	(Japan) Toshiba Brave Lupus Tokyo

== Notable former players ==
- Yoshihiro Sakata, 16 caps, member of World Rugby Hall of Fame
- Toshiyuki Hayashi, legendary lock with Kobe Steel, Oxford and Japan.
- Seiji Hirao, centre, former Japan captain and coach of Japan (RWC1999).
- Keiji Hirose, former fly-half, and previously the leading points scorer for Japan (now second).
- Kensuke Iwabuchi, the first Japanese to play professional rugby in England (for Saracens), also technical adviser to Sanix.
- Toru Kurihara, world record points scorer in one match, 60 points scored individually (6 Tries, 15 conversions).
- Sinali Latu, now coach of Daito Bunka University RFC.
- Yuji Matsuo, fly-half (stand-off), Shin-Nittetsu Kamaishi.
- Andrew Miller, fly-half for Kobe Steel and Japan.
- Takuro Miuchi, former number 8 and captain at the 2007 Rugby World Cup.
- Wataru Murata, player of Yamaha Jubilo.
- Daisuke Ohata, world record try scorer (69 tries throughout his career) member of World Rugby Hall of Fame
- Atsushi Oyagi, lock, Kobe Steel and Japan, now a TV personality ("talento").
- Kenzo Suzuki, better known as a professional wrestler, Suzuki was capped for the national team.
- Yoshihito Yoshida, world class Japanese wing, known especially on the Sevens circuit.
- Ayumu Goromaru, former fullback and the leading points scorer for Japan.
- Kenki Fukuoka, former wing of Japan, known for his speed and sidesteps.

== Player records (career) ==
=== Most matches ===
#	Player	Pos	Span	Mat	Start	Sub	Won	Lost	Draw	%
1	Hitoshi Ono	Lock	2004–2016	98	78	20	60	35	3	63
2	Michael Leitch	Flanker	2008–	97	85	12	53	42	2	54
3	Hirotoki Onozawa	Wing	2001–2013	81	73	8	41	37	3	52
4	Yukio Motoki	Centre	1991–2005	79	73	6	31	47	1	40
5	Kensuke Hatakeyama	Prop	2008–2016	78	57	21	50	27	1	65
6	Shota Horie	Hooker	2009–2023	76	63	13	47	27	2	67
7	Fumiaki Tanaka	Scrum-half	2008–2019	75	60	15	46	27	2	63
8	Luke Thompson	Lock	2007–2019	71	59	12	44	25	2	63
9	Yu Tamura	Fly-half	2012–2022	70	53	17	42	27	1	64
10	Takashi Kikutani	Number 8	2005–2014	68	57	11	41	26	1	61

Last updated: Australia vs Japan, 15 August 2026. Statistics include officially capped matches only.

=== Most tries ===
#	Player	Pos	Span	Mat	Start	Sub	Pts	Tries
1	Daisuke Ohata	Wing	1996–2006	58	55	3	345	69
2	Hirotoki Onozawa	Wing	2001–2013	81	73	8	275	55
3	Takashi Kikutani	Number 8	2005–2014	68	57	11	160	32
4	Terunori Masuho	Wing	1991–2001	47	46	1	147	29
5	Yoshikazu Fujita	Wing	2012–2017	30	20	10	130	26
6	Kenki Fukuoka	Wing	2013–2019	38	31	7	125	25
7	Kotaro Matsushima	Fullback	2014–2023	55	48	7	115	23
8	Koliniasi Holani	Number 8	2008–2016	44	38	6	110	22
8	Michael Leitch	Flanker	2008–	97	85	12	110	22
10	Alisi Tupuailei	Centre	2009–2011	20	13	7	105	21

Last updated: Australia vs Japan, 15 August 2026. Statistics include officially capped matches only.

=== Most points ===
#	Player	Pos	Span	Mat	Pts	Tries	Conv	Pens	Drop
1	Ayumu Goromaru	Fullback	2005–2015	56	708	18	162	98	0
2	Keiji Hirose	Fly-half	1994–2005	40	422	5	77	79	2
3	Toru Kurihara	Wing	2000–2003	28	347	20	71	35	0
4	Daisuke Ohata	Wing	1996–2006	58	345	69	0	0	0
5	Yu Tamura	Fly-half	2012–2022	70	303	5	64	50	0
6	James Arlidge	Fly-half	2007–2011	32	286	8	78	28	2
7	Hirotoki Onozawa	Wing	2001–2013	81	275	55	0	0	0
8	Lee Seung-Sin	Fly-Half	2022–	29	269	2	66	39	0
9	Shaun Webb	Fly-half	2008–2011	35	198	18	45	6	0
10	Ryan Nicholas	Centre	2008–2012	38	193	9	53	14	0

Last updated: Georgia vs Japan, 22 November 2025. Statistics include officially capped matches only.

=== Most matches as captain ===
#	Player	Pos	Span	Mat	Won	Lost	Draw	%	Pts	Tries
1	Takuro Miuchi	Number 8	2002–2008	45	17	27	1	38.88	30	6
2	Michael Leitch	Flanker	2014–2025	40	23	16	1	57.50	55	11
3	Takashi Kikutani	Number 8	2008–2013	34	21	12	1	63.23	110	22
4	Warner Dearns	Lock	2025-	18	5	13	0	27.78	50	10
4	Toshiaki Hirose	Wing	2012–2013	18	13	5	0	72.22	45	9
6	Masahiro Kunda	Hooker	1993–1998	14	5	9	0	35.71	0	0
7	Yukio Motoki	Centre	1996–1997	12	4	8	0	33.33	5	1
8	Seiji Hirao	Centre	1989–1991	11	5	6	0	45.45	0	0
9	Toshiyuki Hayashi	Lock	1986–1987	10	1	8	1	15.00	0	0
9	Andrew McCormick	Centre	1998–1999	10	4	6	0	40.00	5	1
9	Akira Yokoi	Centre	1970–1974	10	3	6	1	35.00	0	0

Last updated: Scotland vs Japan, 21 November 2026. Statistics include officially capped matches only.

== Player records (match) ==
=== Most points in a match ===
#	Player	Pos	Pts	Tries	Conv	Pens	Drop	Opposition	Venue	Date
1	Toru Kurihara	Wing	60	6	15	0	0	Chinese Taipei	(Chinese Taipei) Tainan	21 July 2002
2	Daisuke Ohata	Wing	40	8	0	0	0	Chinese Taipei	(Chinese Taipei) Tainan	21 July 2002
3	Ayumu Goromaru	Fullback	37	1	16	0	0	Sri Lanka	(Japan) Nagoya	10 May 2014
4	Ayumu Goromaru	Fullback	36	1	14	1	0	Philippines	(Japan) Fukuoka	20 April 2013
5	Toru Kurihara	Wing	35	2	11	1	0	South Korea	(Japan) Tokyo	16 June 2002
6	Keiji Hirose	Fly-half	34	1	1	9	0	Tonga	(Japan) Tokyo	8 May 1999
7	Ayumu Goromaru	Fullback	32	2	11	0	0	Kazakhstan	(Kazakhstan) Almaty	28 April 2012
8	Keiji Hirose	Fly-half	31	0	11	3	0	Hong Kong	(Japan) Tokyo	8 May 2005
9	4 players on 30 points									

Last updated: Japan vs Italy, 21 July 2024. Statistics include officially capped matches only.

=== Most tries in a match ===
#	Player	Pos	Pts	Tries	Conv	Pens	Drop	Opposition	Venue	Date
1	Daisuke Ohata	Wing	40	8	0	0	0	Chinese Taipei	(Japan) Tokyo	7 July 2002
2	Toru Kurihara	Wing	60	6	15	0	0	Chinese Taipei	(Chinese Taipei) Tainan	21 July 2002
2	Daisuke Ohata	Wing	30	6	0	0	0	Hong Kong	(Japan) Tokyo	8 May 2005
2	Yoshikazu Fujita	Wing	30	6	0	0	0	United Arab Emirates	(Japan) Fukuoka	5 May 2012
5	Terunori Masuho	Wing	25	5	0	0	0	Chinese Taipei	Singapore	27 October 1998
5	Kosuke Endo	Wing	25	5	0	0	0	South Korea	(South Korea) Daegu	1 May 2010
5	Alisi Tupuailei	Centre	25	5	0	0	0	Sri Lanka	(Sri Lanka) Colombo	21 May 2011
5	Kentaro Kodama	Wing	25	5	0	0	0	South Korea	(Japan) Kanagawa	30 April 2016
9	10 players on 4 tries									

Last updated: Japan vs Italy, 21 July 2024. Statistics include officially capped matches only.

== Tournament history ==
=== Rugby World Cup ===
Japan has participated in the Rugby World Cup since the tournament's inception in 1987, and has made appearances in all tournaments thus far. Despite this, they experienced little success until the 2015 tournament, with just one victory over Zimbabwe in 1991, and two draws with Canada in 2007 and 2011. In 2015 they defeated South Africa with a score of 34–32, their first win since 1991 against Zimbabwe, which they followed up with victories over Samoa and the United States in the same pool stage, but despite their 3–1 record failed to reach the knockout round.

They were the home team for the 2019 Rugby World Cup, which was held in Japan.

In the 2019 World Cup, Japan were drawn in Group A alongside Ireland, Russia, Samoa, and Scotland. After a nervy opening night win against Russia (30–10), Japan went on to beat Ireland 19–12, a huge upset and a result few predicted. Their third group game against Samoa ended in another win, this time 38–19, while also securing a highly important bonus point (for scoring four or more tries).

In the highly anticipated final group game against Scotland, both teams needed to win to progress to the knockout stages at the expense of the other. The match went ahead despite pre-game worries that it would have to be cancelled due to the ongoing issues caused by Typhoon Hagibis. The pre-tournament rules stated that if the typhoon was sufficient to intervene, the game would be cancelled, and the result declared a draw. This controversial rule would have allowed Japan to progress by default due to previous results.

After final safety checks, the game was allowed to commence. Japan edged out Scotland 28–21 to register their second shock win of the tournament. They also became the first Asian nation to top their group at a Rugby World Cup, and the first Asian team to progress to the knockout stages.

Japan played South Africa in the quarter-finals in Tokyo on Sunday 20 October 2019, kick off 19:15 JST. They kept pace with South Africa in the first half, but two tries and three penalties in the second half for South Africa put the game out of reach and Japan lost 26–3.

Rugby World Cup record									Qualification						
Year	Round	Pld	W	D	L	PF	PA	Squad	Pos	Pld	W	D	L	PF	PA
(New Zealand) 1987	Pool stage	3	0	0	3	48	123	Squad	Invited						
(England) (France) (Ireland) (Scotland) (Wales) 1991	Pool stage	3	1	0	2	77	87	Squad	2nd	3	2	0	1	65	63
(South Africa) 1995	Pool stage	3	0	0	3	55	252	Squad	1st	4	4	0	0	252	28
(Wales) 1999	Pool stage	3	0	0	3	36	140	Squad	1st	3	3	0	0	221	25
(Australia) 2003	Pool stage	4	0	0	4	79	163	Squad	1st	4	4	0	0	420	47
(France) 2007	Pool stage	4	0	1	3	64	210	Squad	1st	6	6	0	0	379	60
(New Zealand) 2011	Pool stage	4	0	1	3	69	184	Squad	1st	4	4	0	0	326	30
(England) 2015	Pool stage	4	3	0	1	98	100	Squad	1st	8	8	0	0	658	41
(Japan) 2019	Quarter-finals	5	4	0	1	118	88	Squad	Automatic qualification						
(France) 2023	Pool stage	4	2	0	2	109	107	Squad	Automatic qualification						
(Australia) 2027	Qualified								Automatic qualification						
(United States) 2031	To be determined								To be determined						
Total	—	37	10	2	25	753	1454	—	—	31	30	0	1	2295	283
Champions; Runners–up; Third place; Fourth place; Home venue

=== Pacific Nations Cup ===
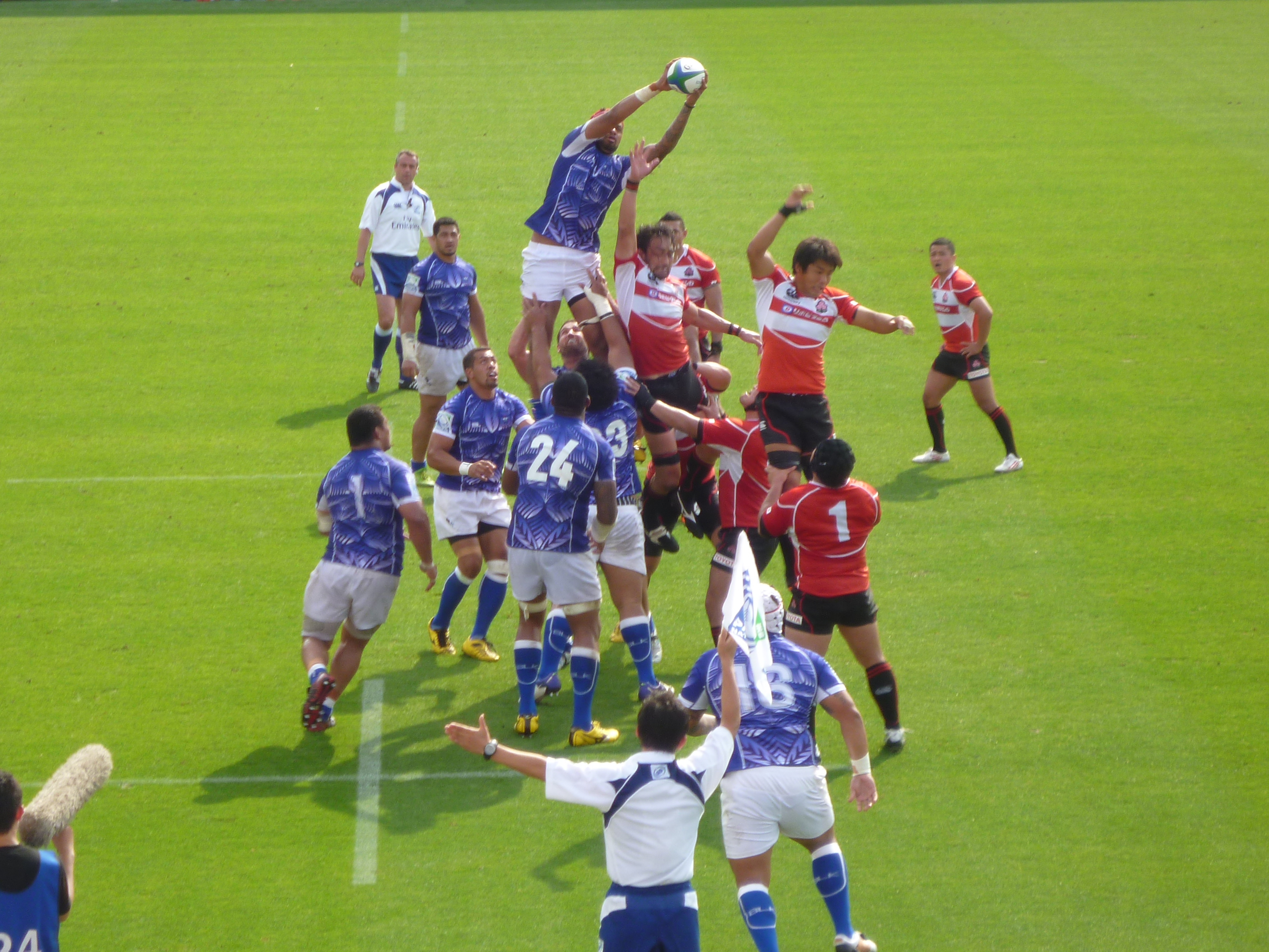
Pacific Nations Cup Match at Chichibunomiya Stadium on 17 June 2012, in which Samoa defeated Japan 27–26

Pacific Nations Cup record
Year	Finish/Round	Pld.	W	D	L	PF	PA	Squad	Head coach
2006	5th of 5	4	0	0	4	48	177	—N/a	J-P Élissalde
2007	6th of 6	5	1	0	4	51	182	—N/a	J. Kirwan
2008	5th of 6	5	1	0	4	121	181	—N/a	J. Kirwan
2009	4th of 5	4	1	0	3	96	145	—N/a	J. Kirwan
2010	3rd of 4	3	2	0	1	65	68	—N/a	J. Kirwan
2011	Champions	3	2	0	1	67	74	—N/a	J. Kirwan
2012	4th of 4	3	0	0	3	65	76	—N/a	E. Jones
2013	4th of 5	4	2	0	2	79	82	Squad	E. Jones
2014	Champions (Note: In the Asia/Pacific conference.)	2	2	0	0	71	54	Squad	E. Jones
2015	4th of 6	4	1	0	3	80	87	Squad	E. Jones
2019	Champions	3	3	0	0	109	48	Squad	J. Joseph
2024	2nd of 6	4	3	0	1	162	120	Squad	E. Jones
2025	2nd of 6	4	3	0	1	193	93	Squad	E. Jones
2026	Champions	2	2	0	0	83	29	Squad	E. Jones
Total	Champions (4)	50	23	0	27	1,290	1,416	—N/a	

=== Asia Rugby Championship ===
Asia Rugby Championship record
Year	Round	P	W	D	L	PF	PA
1969 (Japan)	Champions	4	4	0	0	191	35
1970 (Thailand)	Champions	3	3	0	0	111	39
1972 (Hong Kong)	Champions	4	4	0	0	167	4
1974 (Sri Lanka)	Champions	4	4	0	0	140	37
1976 (Japan)	Champions	4	4	0	0	194	21
1978 (Malaysia)	Champions	3	3	0	0	97	30
1980 (Taiwan)	Champions	4	4	0	0	265	21
1982 (Singapore)	Runner-up	4	3	0	1	112	30
1984 (Japan)	Champions	4	4	0	0	202	23
1986 (Thailand)	Runner-up	4	2	0	2	232	54
1988 (Hong Kong)	Runner-up	4	3	0	1	223	43
1990 (Sri Lanka)	Runner-up	4	3	0	1	200	34
1992 (Hong Kong)	Champions	3	3	0	0	225	12
1994 (Malaysia)	Champions	3	3	0	0	226	17
1996 (Taiwan)	Champions	2	2	0	0	242	22
1998 (Singapore)	Champions	3	3	0	0	221	25
2000 (Japan)	Champions	3	3	0	0	164	41
2002 (Thailand)	Runner-up	3	2	0	1	93	54
2004 (Hong Kong)	Champions	2	2	0	0	69	12
2006–07 (Hong Kong)	Champions	2	2	0	0	106	3
2008 (Hong Kong) (Japan) (South Korea) (Kazakhstan) (United Arab Emirates) (Qatar)	Champions	4	4	0	0	310	58
2009 (Hong Kong) (Japan) (South Korea) (Kazakhstan) (Singapore)	Champions	4	4	0	0	271	40
2010 (Hong Kong) (Japan) (South Korea) (Kazakhstan) (United Arab Emirates) (Bahrain)	Champions	4	4	0	0	326	30
2011 (Hong Kong) (Japan) (Sri Lanka) (Kazakhstan) (United Arab Emirates)	Champions	4	4	0	0	307	35
2012 (Hong Kong) (Japan) (South Korea) (Kazakhstan) (United Arab Emirates)	Champions	4	4	0	0	312	11
2013 (Hong Kong) (Japan) (South Korea) (Philippines) (United Arab Emirates)	Champions	4	4	0	0	316	8
2014 (Hong Kong) (Japan) (South Korea) (Philippines) (Sri Lanka)	Champions	4	4	0	0	342	33
2015 (Hong Kong) (Japan) (South Korea)	Champions	4	3	1	0	163	40
2016 (Hong Kong) (Japan) (South Korea)	Champions	4	4	0	0	242	23
2017 (Hong Kong) (Japan) (South Korea)	Champions	4	4	0	0	172	56
Total	25 titles	107	100	1	6	6286	891

== See also ==
- Rugby union in Japan
- List of Japan national rugby union test matches
- Japan women's national rugby union team
