= 2016 Cup of Nations (rugby union) =

- Countries: Hong Kong Papua New Guinea; Russia Zimbabwe
- Date: 11–19 November 2016
- Champions: Russia (2nd title)
- Runners-up: Hong Kong

The 2016 Cup of Nations was the fourth Cup of Nations rugby union tournament since its creation in 2011. The tournament returned to Hong Kong, reprising its name as the Hong Kong Cup of Nations. The tournament acted as a year ending tournament for "up and coming" tier 3 teams from different continents, providing greater preparation for teams to play in their regional competitions, especially with the 2016 participants aiming to qualify for the 2019 Rugby World Cup or to make the Rugby World Cup global repechage in November 2018.

The four competing teams were hosts Hong Kong, reigning champions Russia, Zimbabwe and Papua New Guinea, who were new to the tournament. Russia successfully defended their title, winning the competition with 14 points.

== Format ==
The tournament was played as a single round-robin, with the winner being the team with the most table points after the third round of fixtures.

The points for the tournament were awarded for:

- Win = 4 points
- Draw = 2 points
- Loss = 1 point
- Scoring 4 or more tries in one game = 1 bonus point
- Losing by 7 or less points = 1 bonus point

== Standings ==
Place	Nation	Games				Points			Bonus points	Table points
Place	Nation	Played	Won	Drawn	Lost	For	Against	Difference	Bonus points	Table points
1	Russia	3	3	0	0	95	34	+61	2	14
2	Hong Kong	3	2	0	1	85	33	+42	2	10
3	Zimbabwe	3	1	0	2	64	64	+0	2	6
4	Papua New Guinea	3	0	0	3	35	138	-103	0	0

== Fixtures ==
=== Round 1 ===
11 November 2016

Russia	19-15	Zimbabwe
	Report

Hong Kong Football Club Stadium

11 November 2016

Hong Kong	51-5	Papua New Guinea
	Report

Hong Kong Football Club Stadium

=== Round 2 ===
15 November 2016

Russia	49-19	Papua New Guinea
	Report

Hong Kong Football Club Stadium

15 November 2016

Hong Kong	34-11	Zimbabwe
	Report

Hong Kong Football Club Stadium

=== Round 3 ===
19 November 2016

Zimbabwe	38 - 11	Papua New Guinea

Hong Kong Football Club Stadium

19 November 2016

Hong Kong	0 - 27	Russia

Hong Kong Football Club Stadium

== See also ==
- 2016 end-of-year rugby union internationals
