= Rob Yule =

Robin Yule
- Born: Robin John Yule New Plymouth, New Zealand
- Occupation: Rugby union coach

Rugby union career
Provincial / State sides
Years	Team	Apps	(Points)
- Taranaki
Coaching career
- Years: Team
- 2011: Mitsubishi Sagamihara DynaBoars
- 2010: Kazakhstan
- 2009-2010: Lebanon
- 2008-2009: Iran
- 2006-2007: Sri Lanka
- 1996-2007: Taranaki RFU (Program Development Manager)

Robin John Yule is a New Zealand rugby union coach.

In September 2006, Yule, the Program Development Manager of New Zealand's Taranaki Rugby Football Union, was in Sri Lanka as a special observer for Singer Sri Lankan International Rugby Sevens in Kandy. Having joined Taranaki rugby in March 1996, Yule has contributed immensely towards the province's success in New Zealand Rugby.

== Coaching career ==
Rob Yule coached Sri Lanka national rugby union team from 2007–2008 and finished runner up to Kazakhstan in the ASIAD trophy tournament in Colombo. In 2008, Rob Yule travelled to Tehran where he became coach of the Iran national rugby union team. He worked for the Iran Olympic committee developing the game of Rugby Union in the Islamic Republic of Iran. During the 2008 season, Yule took the national team to a tournament in Bishkek, Kyrgyzstan where they beat both Kyrgyzstan and Uzbekistan to win promotion to Asian Rugby Football Union Division 3. During this period Yule also assisted the Iran Rugby Federation to complete their application for IRB membership, something they achieved in 2010 as the newest member nation to gain full IRB membership at that time.

After completing the 2009 season in Iran, Rob Yule returned to New Zealand where he was asked to travel to Lebanon to work on an IRB funded project to develop Rugby in the East Asian project region.

Rob Yule worked to establish with the local committee a strategic plan which eventually saw Lebanon admitted as an associate member of Asian Rugby Football Union in 2010 and played their first ever international against Jordan in Dubai winning this historic match in fine style.

In July 2010 he also took the first ever middle east national sevens team (Lebanon) to the World University games in Porto, Portugal.

In August 2010, Rob Yule travelled to Kazakhstan to prepare the Kazakhstan U20 side to play in a tournament in Laos where they were runner up to eventual winners Philippines. He returned to Almaty, Kazakhstan in November 2010 to take over the Kazakhstan Men's Sevens programme where they competed in tournaments in Sri Lanka and Dubai.

Rob Yule left Lebanon in December to return to New Zealand and in March 2011 was contracted to Mitsubishi Dynaboars in Sagimahara, Tokyo, Japan where he worked as a resource coach for seven months with their professional rugby team's program.

Rob Yule now resides in Perth West Australia and is a director of NZRugbyresources who operate a global rugby development business and a website ( www.nzrugbyresources.com ) which produces monthly technical newsletters going to over 70 countries.

He currently coaches at Cottesloe RFC in Perth, West Australia.
