= Tetsunosuke Onishi =

Japanese professor & rugby union coach (1916-1995)

Tetsunosuke Onishi (大西 鐡之祐, Ōnishi Tetsunosuke; April 7, 1916 – September 19, 1995) was a professor of Waseda University, coach of the Japan national rugby union team and Waseda University Rugby Football Club. He has been described as a Japanese Carwyn James and was a coach of considerable achievements. He also served as a member of the Japanese Olympic Committee.

== Career ==
He played flanker at Waseda University, joining the Toshiba company on graduation. After World War Two he returned to Waseda to teach and was appointed coach of the rugby club after his elder brother. He was coach of the Japanese team from 1966 to 1971. In 1968, they defeated the Junior All Blacks in New Zealand 23–19, and lost 3–6 to England in 1971 at Chichibunomiya rugby stadium in Tokyo.

In 1981 he was appointed Waseda's coach for the third time, and the following year on a tour to France and England gained the first win over Cambridge University R.U.F.C. by a Japanese team, 13–12.

Sporting positions
Preceded by (Japan) Kasai Yasujiro	Japan National Rugby Union Coach; 1966-1971	Succeeded by (Japan) Hitoshi Oka
