= Hong Kong national rugby union team =

Hong Kong Rugby
- Emblem: Chinese dragon
- Union: Hong Kong China Rugby
- Head coach: Logan Asplin
- Captain: Josh Hrstich
- Most caps: Nick Hewson (58)
- Top scorer: Matthew Rosslee (201)
- Top try scorer: Rowan Varty (24)
- Home stadium: Kai Tak Stadium & Hong Kong Football Club Stadium
First colours	Second colours

World Rugby ranking
- Current: 23 (as of 6 April 2026)
- Highest: 21 (2018, 2019, 2020, 2021, 2022)
- Lowest: 39 (2009, 2010)

First international
- Hong Kong 11–5 Australian Universities (Australia) (1934)

Biggest win
- Hong Kong 164–13 Singapore (Kuala Lumpur, Malaysia; 27 October 1994)

Biggest defeat
- Japan 94–5 Hong Kong (Tokyo, Japan; 22 May 2010)

World Cup
- Appearances: 1 (first in 2027)
- Website: www.hkrugby.com

The Hong Kong men's national rugby union team represents Hong Kong in men's rugby union. Since 1952, rugby union in Hong Kong has been administered by Hong Kong China Rugby.

Hong Kong has one of the oldest rugby traditions in Asia, having been played there since the 19th century, when British colonists arrived in Hong Kong and brought the sport with them.

For a long time, rugby union in Hong Kong was traditionally associated with Hong Kong's British colonial settlers, but since the 1990s there has been extensive efforts to integrate the game with the local Cantonese Chinese community, it included some local born players, with a degree of success; the first of these players being "Rambo" Leung Yeung Kit, considered to be, one of best Hong Kong players during his era. Other players such as Ricky Cheuk, Max Woodward, Nick Hewson, Rowan Varty and Cado Lee had made significant impact in international tournaments.

Hong Kong has finished first place in the Asia Rugby Championship in 7 years in a row from 2018 to 2026.

They qualified for the 2027 Rugby World Cup for the first time by winning the 2025 Asia Rugby Championship.

== History ==
=== Early history ===
According to old newspapers, rugby union in Hong Kong dates back to the late 1870s, which would establish Hong Kong as perhaps the oldest rugby playing nation in Asia. The players during this era were all British sailors and army/navy men, as well as police and merchant men. The first secretary of rugby in Hong Kong was Jock McGregor.

The first fixtures which predate the creation of the modern Hong Kong Rugby Union in 1952 took place from 1924 to 1949. An unofficial interport team from Hong Kong played Shanghai on various dates from 1924 to 1949, both teams being composed entirely of British expatriates living in said port cities; these fixtures ceased after the establishment of Communist rule in mainland China. In 1934, a Hong Kong team played against an Australia Universities team, running out victors 11 to 5.

After the establishment of modern Chinese borders, which before greyed the exact control a union had over territory in China, the Hong Kong Rugby Union was established in 1952; the continuation of British rule in China, as well as the flow of immigrants and capital from the mainland, as well as Hong Kong establishing itself as a major port, allowed the game to flourish, albeit mostly restricted to the white British community.

During this time frame the first official fixtures under the union took place. Hong Kong first received an NZ Universities team in 1958, losing 47 to nil. In 1958, Larry Abel, one of Hong Kong's earliest rugby pioneers, established mini rugby programmes and tournaments, and has been played annually to this day. In 1968, Hong Kong was one of the charter nations of the Asian Rugby Football Union, the others being Japan, Malaysia, Singapore, Sri Lanka, South Korea, and Thailand. Hong Kong won its first official fixture against Japan in 1969, by the score of 24 to 22 in Tokyo.

=== 1970s ===
During the 1970s Hong Kong played against many of its other Asian neighbours which had a rugby history, these nations being Japan, South Korea, Chinese Taipei, Thailand, Malaysia, Sri Lanka, and Singapore. Hong Kong enjoyed and endured mixed success against its neighbours, finishing second in 1972, only to lose to Japan 16 to nil on home soil.

In 1976, the first ever edition of the Hong Kong Sevens was established, which was pivotal in strengthening the sport in Hong Kong. The concept was discussed by business partners Ian Gow and Tokkie Smith, who wanted to promote a viable rugby product in Asia. The first sponsors of this event were Cathay Pacific and Rothmans International, later replaced by HSBC.

The first sides at this competition were Asian, as well as two representative sides from Australia and New Zealand. Soon, the competition grew to include teams from around the world before becoming an official part of the Rugby Sevens calendar.

=== 1980s–1990s ===
During the 1980s, Hong Kong lagged behind Japan and South Korea in terms of competition; Hong Kong was successful against other Asian nations but consistently finished in third place, whereas Japan and South Korea were vying for the top crown. Hong Kong officially joined the IRB in 1988, allowing Hong Kong to compete in the Rugby World Cup, though they did not enter the competition to qualify for 1991.

The 1990s proved to be a much more fruitful decade for Hong Kong. Hong Kong played its first ever test match against a non-Asia-Pacific opponent in 1992, losing 16 to 23 to the United States in 1992 in Kezar Stadium, San Francisco. In the same year, Hong Kong finally broke through and reached the final of the Asia Rugby Championship, beating South Korea 20 to 13 before losing to Japan 9 to 37.

Some notable players during the 1990s represented Hong Kong at the international level including Ashley Billington, David Lewis, Leung Yeung Kit, Chan Fuk Ping and Pieter Schats.

Hong Kong participated in its first qualifying tournament for the Rugby World Cup in 1995, being drawn with Thailand and Singapore in its group. Hong Kong lost its opening fixture to South Korea 28 to 17 before beating its other opponents; Hong Kong therefore missed out on a spot at the 1995 Rugby World Cup. An impressive feat achieved during this campaign though was Ashley Billington's ten tries versus Singapore on 10 November 1994, which is the most tries ever scored in a Rugby World Cup qualifier by a single player.

Through the 1990s, Hong Kong began organizing tests against non-Asian opponents. Opponents that were played were Namibia, Papua New Guinea, the United States, and Canada. Hong Kong recorded some famous victories, beating the USA Eagles on three occasions in the decade, including a victory in San Francisco, and beating Canada in 1998.

Despite major improvement in the 1990s, Hong Kong bottomed out in its qualifying group for the 1999 Rugby World Cup; Hong Kong beat its nemesis South Korea, but lost to Japan and were upset by the Chinese Taipei; they finished fourth and missed on direct qualification and a repechage.

=== 2000–2015: the new millennium ===
In 2000, Hong Kong made history when they played China; this was the first test that Hong Kong played against a team from mainland China since 1949. The game was played in Shanghai to honour the old rugby matches between Hong Kong and Shanghai. China upset Hong Kong 17 to 15 that day.

Hong Kong struggled during the early 2000s and in 2001, Hong Kong were once again surprised by China, drawing at 25 points each in Guangzhou. In the 2003 Rugby World Cup qualifying, Hong Kong were upset by the Chinese Taipei, losing 20 to 15 to see them fail to progress past the second round of the qualification process; although Hong Kong did beat China for the first time in that same qualification.

In 2005, Hong Kong finished bottom of their division during the 2007 Rugby World Cup Asian qualification process, seeing the drop down to the second division of Asian rugby for 2006. However, with wins over China and Sri Lanka they quickly returned to the top division for the final stage of qualification. Hong Kong later lost all its fixtures in the final round of the World Cup qualifying campaign, missing out again on repechage or qualification.

The 2011 qualifying campaign was similar: Hong Kong beat both South Korea as well as newcomers Kazakhstan, but lost a crucial fixture to the Arabian Gulf; due to bonus points, Kazakhstan advanced instead of Hong Kong to the repechage.

After the 2011, Hong Kong became a development nation for World Rugby, and were included in the inaugural Cup of Nations tournament held in Dubai. Hong Kong won the tournament, earning their first bit of significant silverware.

=== 2015: The growth of Hong Kong Rugby ===
Between 2011 and 2015, Hong Kong rugby continued to grow, and by the time of the 2015 Rugby World Cup qualifiers, Hong Kong established themselves as the second ranked team in Asian behind Japan. In this time, Hong Kong thrashed South Korea 39 to 6, as well as recording a resounding 108 to 0 victory over the Philippines. At the conclusion of the 2014 Asian Five Nations, Hong Kong finished as runners-up, to see them advance to the 2015 Rugby World Cup repechage play-offs against Uruguay.

In the repechage match, Hong Kong held firm for the first half, only trailing 6 to 3; however, Hong Kong indiscipline, coupled with key players not being available, meant that Hong Kong collapsed in the second half, losing 28 to 3, and bowing out of the qualifiers.

At the end of 2015, Hong Kong hosted the 2015 Cup of Nations, which included 3 other emerging rugby nations: Portugal, Russia, and Zimbabwe. Hong Kong finished second, beating Portugal and Zimbabwe but losing to Russia.

In 2016, Hong Kong hired Leigh Jones, Japan's defence coach who played a key role in Japan's epic upset of South Africa in the 2015 Rugby World Cup, to take the role of head coach and high performance in Hong Kong.

In order to further build for future success, the HKRU, under the vision of Leigh Jones, launched its first fully professional 15s programme called the Elite Rugby Program; the goal of the programme is to encourage domestic players to pursue rugby as a profession in Hong Kong, and long-term, create a professional competition akin to Japan's Top League.

The foundations set by Jones, saw Hong Kong finish as runners-up in the Asia Rugby Championship in 2016 and 2017, seeing them finish in second for four straight years.

Hong Kong continued to receive World Rugby development status, and hosted the Cup of Nations tournament in 2016 Cup of Nations and 2017 Cup of Nations. In both tournament, they finished in second, behind Russia in both 2016 and 2017.

With Japan already qualified for the 2019 Rugby World Cup (by virtue of hosting), the 2018 Asia Rugby Championship saw only the developing nations in Asia compete, a stance that still remains. This saw Hong Kong claim the title for the first time, winning all four of their games over South Korea and Malaysia. This saw them progress in the 2019 Rugby World Cup qualifying process, advancing to an Asia/Oceania play-off series against the Cook Islands, which they won on aggregate 77 to 3.

In a revamped World Cup qualifying Repechage, Hong Kong played in a round-robin tournament against Canada, Germany and Kenya to earn the final spot in the 2019 Rugby World Cup. Hong Kong finished in third spot with just one win over Kenya.

Between 2019 and 2023, Hong Kong retained their Asian Rugby Championship title, and in 2022 once again advances to a World Cup Final Qualification Tournament. However, like in 2018, they only secured one victory (again against Kenya), to them not progress to the World Cup.

From 2018 and 2021, Hong Kong also played alongside will the Western Force and other developing Asian sides in the Global Rapid Rugby competition.

Ahead of the 2027 Rugby World Cup, World Rugby expended the competition to 24 teams, and the qualification process granted Asia a direct spot into the World Cup alongside the already qualified Japan. This encouraged further development for Hong Kong, prompting a tour to South America during the 2024 July window and significant home tests during the 2024 November window.

In June and July 2025, Hong Kong competed against the United Arab Emirates, South Korea, and Sri Lanka in the 2025 Asia Rugby Championship. Hong Kong won all their matches to remain Champions and in doing so they qualified for the Rugby World Cup for the first time, becoming just the second Asian nation to qualify. They will play Australia in the opening match.

== Team image ==
=== Kits ===
The national team's home kit is typically a blue shirt, blue shorts, and black or white socks, while the away kit features red and white shirts and shorts, and red or white socks.

==== Kit suppliers ====
Kit supplier	Period
Reebok	1990s
Adidas	1990s
Canterbury of New Zealand	1990s- 2000s
Kukri Sports	2006–2024
Castore	2024–present

== Overall ==
Men's World Rugby Rankings Top 30 as of 16 November 2026
Rank	Change (Note: Change from the previous week)	Team	Points
1	Steady	South Africa	91.53
2	Steady	New Zealand	90.65
3	▲1	France	89.05
4	▼1	Ireland	88.70
5	Steady	England	86.99
6	Steady	Scotland	85.28
7	Steady	Australia	82.24
8	Steady	Argentina	82.09
9	▲1	Wales	79.37
10	▼1	Fiji	77.79
11	Steady	Italy	75.84
12	Steady	Japan	75.25
13	Steady	Georgia	74.23
14	▲1	United States	68.39
15	▼1	Portugal	68.24
16	▲3	Samoa	67.60
17	▲1	Chile	67.00
18	▼2	Spain	66.53
19	▼2	Tonga	65.58
20	Steady	Uruguay	65.17
21	Steady	Canada	63.38
22	Steady	Belgium	62.00
23	Steady	Romania	61.13
24	Steady	Hong Kong	58.46
25	Steady	Zimbabwe	57.71
26	Steady	Netherlands	56.44
27	Steady	Namibia	56.03
28	Steady	Switzerland	55.47
29	Steady	Czech Republic	55.42
30	Steady	Poland	54.54

Hong_Kong's historical rankings

Source: World Rugby
Graph updated to 16 November 2026

Below is a table of the representative rugby matches played by a Hong Kong national XV at test level up until 21 November 2026, updated after match with Tonga.

Opponent	Played	Won	Lost	Drawn	Win %	For	Aga	Diff
(Cooperation Council for the Arab States of the Gulf) Arabian Gulf	6	4	2	0	66.67%	101	115	–14
(Australia) Australian Universities	2	1	0	1	50%	14	8	+6
Belgium	5	3	2	0	60%	111	100	+11
Brazil	4	3	0	1	75%	111	68	+43
Canada	8	1	7	0	12.5%	126	247	–121
Chile	3	1	2	0	33.33%	47	66	–19
China	5	3	1	1	60%	108	81	+27
Chinese Taipei	19	13	5	1	68.42%	638	295	+343
Cook Islands	2	2	0	0	100%	77	3	+74
Czech Republic	1	0	1	0	0%	5	17	–12
England A	1	0	1	0	0%	0	26	–26
Fiji	3	0	3	0	0%	33	155	–122
France A	1	0	1	0	0%	6	26	–20
Germany	4	2	2	0	50%	98	76	+22
Japan	28	4	24	0	14.29%	370	1212	–842
Junior Japan	9	1	8	0	11.11%	86	299	–213
Kazakhstan	5	4	1	0	80%	126	67	+59
Kenya	7	4	2	1	57.14%	220	169	+51
Malaysia	11	11	0	0	100%	643	86	+557
Namibia	1	0	1	0	0%	12	22	–10
Netherlands	1	0	1	0	0%	10	25	–15
New Zealand U–23	1	0	1	0	0%	0	47	–47
New Zealand Universities	5	0	5	0	0%	25	142	–117
Norway	1	1	0	0	100%	59	17	+42
Paraguay	1	1	0	0	100%	80	12	+68
Papua New Guinea	3	3	0	0	100%	79	26	+53
Philippines	3	3	0	0	100%	241	30	+211
Portugal	3	1	2	0	33.33%	39	106	–67
Russia	5	0	5	0	0%	62	144	–82
Samoa	1	0	1	0	0%	19	66	–47
Scotland A	1	0	1	0	0%	6	42	–36
Singapore	13	11	2	0	84.62%	540	112	+428
South Korea	37	21	16	0	56.76%	1016	816	+200
Spain	1	0	1	0	0%	7	29	–22
Sri Lanka	11	11	0	0	100%	524	105	+419
Thailand	9	6	3	0	66.67%	289	89	+200
Tonga	2	0	2	0	0%	41	99	–58
Tunisia	2	1	1	0	50%	34	41	–7
United Arab Emirates	7	7	0	0	100%	420	80	+340
United States	9	4	5	0	44.44%	224	229	–5
Uruguay	2	1	1	0	50%	45	68	–23
Wales A	1	0	1	0	0%	3	57	–54
Zimbabwe	3	3	0	0	100%	86	29	+57
Total	246	129	110	7	52.44%	6,669	5,487	+1,179

== Tournament history ==
=== Rugby World Cup ===
Rugby World Cup record									Qualification						
Year	Round	Pld	W	D	L	PF	PA	Squad	Pos	Pld	W	D	L	PF	PA
(New Zealand) (Australia) 1987	Not invited								Not invited						
(England) (France) (Ireland) (Scotland) (Wales) 1991	Did not enter								Did not enter						
(South Africa) 1995	Did not qualify								2nd	3	2	0	1	274	41
(Wales) 1999	Did not qualify								4th	3	1	0	2	39	88
(Australia) 2003	Did not qualify								3rd	4	3	0	1	81	42
(France) 2007	Did not qualify								3rd	6	2	0	4	79	243
(New Zealand) 2011	Did not qualify								3rd	4	2	0	2	65	133
(England) 2015	Did not qualify								P/O	9	5	0	4	333	201
(Japan) 2019	Did not qualify								P/O	9	7	0	2	365	117
(France) 2023	Did not qualify								P/O	5	2	0	3	88	177
(Australia) 2027	Qualified								1st	6	6	0	0	380	57
(United States) 2031	To be determined								To be determined						
Total	—	—	—	—	—	—	—	—	—	49	30	0	19	1704	1099
Champions; Runners–up; Third place; Fourth place; Home venue

=== Asia Rugby Championship ===
Asia Rugby Championship record
Year	Position	P	W	D	L	F	A
(Hong Kong) 1972	Runner-up	3	2	0	1	35	22
(Sri Lanka) 1974	Fifth place	3	1	0	2	43	61
(Malaysia) 1978	Fifth place	3	0	1	2	9	26
(Taiwan) 1980	Third place	4	3	0	1	231	51
(Singapore) 1982	Third place	4	3	0	1	76	41
(Japan) 1984	Fifth place	3	1	0	2	67	70
(Hong Kong) 1988	Third place	4	3	0	1	61	76
(Sri Lanka) 1990	Third place	4	2	0	2	93	56
(Hong Kong) 1992	Runners up	4	3	0	1	156	66
(Malaysia) 1994	Third place	4	3	0	1	354	67
(Taiwan) 1996	Third place	4	3	0	1	298	49
(Singapore) 1998	Third place	3	1	0	2	39	88
(Japan) 2000	Fourth place	3	0	0	3	47	136
(Thailand) 2002	Third place	3	1	0	2	50	85
(Hong Kong) 2004	Third place	2	1	0	1	75	47
(Hong Kong) 2006–07	Third place	2	0	0	2	8	75
(Hong Kong) (Japan) (Kazakhstan) (South Korea) (Qatar) (United Arab Emirates) 2008	Third place	4	2	0	2	96	154
(Hong Kong) (Japan) (Kazakhstan) (South Korea) (Singapore) 2009	Fourth place	4	1	0	3	110	126
(Bahrain) (Hong Kong) (Japan) (Kazakhstan) (South Korea) (United Arab Emirates) 2010	Third place	4	2	0	2	65	133
(Hong Kong) (Japan) (Kazakhstan) (Sri Lanka) (United Arab Emirates) 2011	Runners-up	4	3	0	1	155	61
(Hong Kong) (Japan) (Kazakhstan) (South Korea) (United Arab Emirates) 2012	Third place	2	2	0	2	159	98
(Hong Kong) (Japan) (South Korea) (Philippines) (United Arab Emirates) 2013	Third place	4	2	0	2	134	108
(Hong Kong) (Japan) (South Korea) (Philippines) (Sri Lanka) 2014	Runners-up	4	3	0	1	196	65
(Hong Kong) (Japan) (South Korea) 2015	Runners-up	4	1	1	2	64	111
(Hong Kong) (Japan) (South Korea) 2016	Runners-up	4	2	0	2	95	139
(Hong Kong) (Japan) (South Korea) 2017	Runners-up	4	2	0	2	99	65
(Hong Kong) (South Korea) (Malaysia) 2018	Champions	4	4	0	0	227	44
(Hong Kong) (South Korea) (Malaysia) 2019	Champions	4	4	0	0	212	37
(Hong Kong) (South Korea) (Malaysia) 2022	Champions	1	1	0	0	23	21
(Hong Kong) (South Korea) (Malaysia) 2023	Champions	2	2	0	0	118	19
(Hong Kong) (South Korea) (Malaysia) (United Arab Emirates) 2024	Champions	3	3	0	0	122	11
(Hong Kong) (South Korea) (Sri Lanka) (United Arab Emirates) 2025	Champions	3	3	0	0	191	39
(Hong Kong) (South Korea) (Sri Lanka) 2026	Champions	2	2	0	0	60	23
Total	7 titles	108	65	2	42	3765	2228

=== Cup of Nations ===
Cup of Nations record
Year	Position	P	W	D	L	F	A
(United Arab Emirates) 2011	Champions	3	3	0	0	153	34
(United Arab Emirates) 2012	Runners-up	3	2	0	1	85	37
(Hong Kong) 2015	Runners-up	3	2	0	1	55	48
(Hong Kong) 2016	Runners-up	3	2	0	1	85	33
(Hong Kong) 2017	Runners-up	3	2	0	1	66	52
Total	1 title	15	11	0	4	444	204

== Players ==
=== Current squad ===
On 29 October, Hong Kong named an extended squad ahead of the 2026 World Rugby Nations Cup European-African-Asian Series, and a one-off test match against Belgium.

Head Coach: (New Zealand) Andrew Douglas

- Caps updated: 14 November 2026 (after Hong Kong v Canada)

Player	Position	Date of birth (age)	Caps	Club/province
Harry Baron	Hooker	3 July 1996 (age 30)	5	Hong Kong Scottish
Jude Harding	Hooker		3	(Hong Kong) HKU Sandy Bay
Harrison King	Hooker	1 November 1996 (age 30)	0	Hong Kong Scottish
Alexander Post	Hooker	10 October 1995 (age 31)	29	(Hong Kong) HKU Sandy Bay
Calum Scott	Hooker	28 February 2003 (age 23)	10	(Hong Kong) HKFC
Keelan Chapman	Prop	12 November 1991 (age 35)	15	(Hong Kong) HKFC
Rory Cinnamond	Prop	19 July 1999 (age 27)	13	(Hong Kong) HKU Sandy Bay
Zac Cinnamond	Prop	25 August 1994 (age 32)	20	(Hong Kong) HKU Sandy Bay
Thomas Concu	Prop	16 May 1994 (age 32)	5	(Hong Kong) Valley RFC
Sunia Fameitau	Prop	14 June 1995 (age 31)	13	(Hong Kong) HKU Sandy Bay
Callum McFeat Smith	Prop	8 March 1996 (age 30)	6	(Hong Kong) HKFC
Faizal Solomona-Penesa	Prop	19 March 1992 (age 34)	24	Hong Kong Scottish
Lachlan Doheny	Lock	3 August 2005 (age 21)	6	(Hong Kong) HKFC
Callum McCullough	Lock	1 December 1993 (age 32)	19	(Hong Kong) HKFC
Max Murphy	Lock	8 January 2000 (age 26)	6	(Hong Kong) HKFC
James Rivers	Lock	19 July 2000 (age 26)	5	Hong Kong Scottish
Kyle Sullivan	Lock	20 June 1995 (age 31)	33	(Hong Kong) USRC Tigers
Jack Bartlett	Back row	23 January 2000 (age 26)	5	(Hong Kong) HKFC
Dana Fourie	Back row	11 March 1997 (age 29)	7	(Hong Kong) HKU Sandy Bay
Joshua Hrstich (c)	Back row	15 November 1990 (age 36)	25	(Hong Kong) HKFC
Joseph Knight	Back row	10 April 2001 (age 25)	2	(Hong Kong) Kowloon
Pierce MacKinlay-West	Back row	7 December 1996 (age 29)	19	(Hong Kong) USRC Tigers
Tyler McNutt	Back row	30 April 2003 (age 23)	13	(Hong Kong) HKFC
James Sawyer	Back row	23 May 1993 (age 33)	18	(Hong Kong) Valley RFC
Sam Tsoi	Back row	27 March 1999 (age 27)	7	(Hong Kong) Kowloon
Jack Combes	Scrum-half	28 May 1997 (age 29)	19	(Hong Kong) USRC Tigers
Chui Wai Lap Eric	Scrum-half	12 February 2004 (age 22)	3	(Hong Kong) Kowloon
Brendon Nell	Scrum-half	14 July 1995 (age 31)	5	(Hong Kong) HKU Sandy Bay
Matteo Avitabile	Fly-half	24 February 2002 (age 24)	10	(Hong Kong) HKFC
Joe Barker	Fly-half	14 May 1991 (age 35)	8	(Hong Kong) Kowloon
Nathan de Thierry	Fly-half	14 February 1994 (age 32)	22	(Australia) Hunter Wildfires
Jake Abbott	Centre	6 October 2000 (age 26)	3	(Hong Kong) HKFC
Ben Axten-Burrett	Centre	1 October 1992 (age 34)	23	(Hong Kong) HKFC
Isaac Campbell-Wu	Centre	30 November 2004 (age 21)	6	(Hong Kong) Valley RFC
Thomas Hill	Centre	12 October 1989 (age 37)	19	(Hong Kong) HKFC
Maxwell Threlkeld	Centre	25 January 2005 (age 21)	5	(United States) California Golden Bears
Oliver Pyle	Centre		2	Hong Kong Scottish
Guy Spanton	Centre		8	(Hong Kong) HKU Sandy Bay
Elliott Quinton	Centre	6 June 1999 (age 27)	0	(Hong Kong) Kowloon
Marcus Ramage	Centre	27 May 1998 (age 28)	12	Hong Kong Scottish
Murray Brechin	Wing		5	(Hong Kong) HKFC
Charlie Higson-Smith	Wing	3 August 1991 (age 35)	20	(Hong Kong) HKFC
Harry Sayers	Wing	29 August 1994 (age 32)	21	(Hong Kong) Valley RFC
Sebastian Brien	Wing	20 August 1994 (age 32)	15	(Hong Kong) HKU Sandy Bay
Paul Altier	Fullback	19 May 1999 (age 27)	22	(Hong Kong) Valley RFC
Penetana Carter-Smith	Fullback		1	(Hong Kong) HKFC
Dylan McCann	Fullback		6	(Hong Kong) HKFC
Matt Worley	Fullback	6 September 1997 (age 29)	20	(Hong Kong) HKFC

=== Records ===
==== Most Appearances ====
1. Nick Hewson – 58
2. Alex Ng Wai Shing – 51
3. Salom, Yiu Kam Shing – 49
4. Rowan Varty – 43

=== Notable former players ===
The Hong Kong Rugby Union has inducted 16 players into its Hall of Fame as part of its Roll of Honour. Some of these players include;

- Ashley Billington, wing who holds the record for most tries scored in an international match.

== Coaches ==
=== Current coaching staff ===
Correct as of 29 August 2026

Position	Name
Head coach	(New Zealand) Andrew Douglas
Assistant coach	(New Zealand) Logan Asplin
Assistant coach	(England) Toby Booth
Strength & conditioning coach	(England) Allan Ryan

=== Coaching history ===
Years	Coach
1987–1992	(England) Jim Rowark
1993–1998	(New Zealand) George Simpkin
1998–2001	(New Zealand) Phil Campbell
2001–2003	(New Zealand) Chris Roden
2004–2007	(England) Ivan Torpey
2007–2008	(New Zealand) John Walters
2008–2014	(Wales) Dai Rees
2014–2015	(Scotland) Andrew Hall
2016–2018	(Wales) Leigh Jones
2019–2021	(Scotland) Andrew Hall
2021	(New Zealand) Craig Hammond ^{1}
2021	(England) Simon Armor (Interim) ^{1}
2022–2023	(Wales) Lewis Evans
2023–2025	(New Zealand) Andrew Douglas
2025–2026	(New Zealand) Logan Asplin
2026–	(New Zealand) Andrew Douglas

- ^{1} Hammond appointed head coach in April 2021 but left two months later to return to the UK. He was subsequently replaced by Armor as interim coach ahead of the 2021 Asian Rugby Championship, which was later cancelled due to the COVID-19 pandemic, leading to Armor's abrupt departure.

== See also ==
- Rugby union in Hong Kong
- Hong Kong Sevens
- Hong Kong national rugby sevens team
- Hong Kong national under-20 rugby union team
- Hong Kong women's national rugby union team
- Hong Kong women's national rugby sevens team
- List of Hong Kong national rugby union players

Awards
Preceded by Hong Kong national women's table tennis team	Hong Kong Sports Stars Award; Team Only Sport; 2004	Succeeded by Sun Hei
