= Singapore national rugby union team =

Singapore
- Union: Singapore Rugby Union
- Captain: Gaspar Tan
First colours	Second colours

World Rugby ranking
- Current: 61 (as of 4 November 2024)

First international
- South Korea 11–37 Singapore (Bangkok, Thailand; 9 January 1970)

Biggest win
- Singapore 85–0 India (Singapore; 26 October 1998)

Biggest defeat
- Hong Kong 164–13 Singapore (Kuala Lumpur, Malaysia; 27 October 1994)

The Singapore national rugby union team represents Singapore in men's international Rugby union. The team has yet to make its debut at the Rugby World Cup, though since the 1995 Rugby World Cup, Singapore has been participating in qualification competitions.

== History ==
=== Early history ===
The Singapore Cricket Club is said to have been one of the first rugby clubs in Singapore when employees from the British East India Company brought the game to Singapore. For many years in the 1800s and early 1900s the Singapore team that played against other Malayan states was made up of expatriates who were working in Singapore and army servicemen based in Singapore at the time. With such a large core of servicemen making the "national team" of the time, a Singapore "Civilians XV" also played many games representing the island state.

Up to the 1960s, this representation of Singapore Civilians made up the national team that competed in the annual Malaya Cup that hosted states from around Malaya (now Malaysia). This was the forerunner to the modern day Agong Cup that is currently organised by the Malaysian Rugby Union. This side was made up predominantly of expatriates from the United Kingdom, Australia and New Zealand.

=== The Beginnings of the National Side ===
1971 saw the birth of the Under-23 national team when it played against Malaysia in the Anchor Cup curtain raiser match to the England game. The Under-23 team was made up of all national local boys from the Armed forces, Police force, local clubs and schools. In 1972 the SRU under the presidency of ASP Niaz Mohd Shah from the Police Force decided to brave the challenge and form the new all citizens local national rugby team. The Singapore national team participated in the 3rd ARFUT (Asian Rugby Football Union Tournament) in Hong Kong and emerged a credible 4th position. Leow Kim Liat was the captain for the 1972 team, and became the first Asian to ever captain a Singapore representative side, and the first National Captain.

In 1975, Singapore participated in SEAP (South East Asian Peninsular Games) held in Bangkok. However, Singapore lost to both Thailand and Malaysia and emerged 3rd with a bronze medal. In 1977 Singapore took part in the SEA Games held in Malaysia. Singapore bettered their 1975 performance by winning the silver medal after beating hosts Malaysia, but losing to Thailand in a rain sodden finals match.

In 1978, Singapore Rugby achieved its best ever performance in history under coach Natahar Bava. The team won its first Malaysian Rugby Union (MRU) Cup after 44 years of participation. The Singapore team beat the RNZIR (Royal New Zealand Infantry Battalion) in the semi-finals. They beat the RMAF Blackhawks in the final. Later that same year Singapore took part in the 6th Asian Rugby tournament held in Kuala Lumpur. They emerged with their best ever result to this day with a third-place finishing behind Japan and South Korea when they beat Thailand in a 16-15 third placing game.

For their efforts and achievements, Singapore National Olympic Council (SNOC) awarded Singapore Rugby with the Sportsman of the Year 1978 award to Song Koon Poh, Coach of the year to Natahar Bava and the entire 1978 national team as Singapore's Sports Team of the year. The Singapore team went on to repeat another MRU Cup win under coach Natahar Bava in 1982, beating the Singapore-based Kiwis RNZIR Battalion in the finals.

Singapore also excelled in rugby sevens game during this period. The team under Natahar Bava achieved their best ever 7s game results during 1978, 1979 and 1980 in the HK 7s tournament. Singapore's best ever rugby 7s results were in the 1978 Plate Finals where they lost to Bahrain 0-10 and in 1979 when they qualified for the top 8 teams Cup quarter finals losing out eventually to Western Samoa 4-16. In 1980 again Singapore lost in the Plate Finals to Japan by 0-40 in a flooded rain sodden game.

=== Asian 5 Nations (2008-2014) ===
Singapore competed in the Asian 5 Nations competition from the inaugural 2008 tournament. In 2009 they competed in the premier division of the series. They kept the tournament winners Japan to a 30-point deficit, the smallest of any of Japan's games.

== Rugby World Cup Qualifiers ==
Singapore first tried to qualify for a World Cup for the 1995 tournament in South Africa, taking part in the Asia qualifiers. Singapore played out of Group B in Round 1, though they lost their three fixtures and did not advance to Round 2. Singapore attempted to qualify for the 1999 Rugby World Cup in Wales also; playing in Round 1 of Asia, but losing both of their fixtures against Sri Lanka and Thailand.

Singapore finished second in the final standings of Pool A of Round 1 in attempting to qualify for the 2003 Rugby World Cup in Australia, and did not advance to Round 2. They finished second in their group in qualification for the 2007 Rugby World Cup in France as well, losing one match and winning one.

== Record ==
Below is a table of the representative rugby matches played by a Singapore national XV at test level up until 18 July 2026, updated after match with Chinese Taipei.

Opponent	Played	Won	Lost	Drawn	% Won
Arabian Gulf	2	1	1	0	50%
Brunei	1	1	0	0	100%
China	5	1	3	1	20%
Chinese Taipei	17	5	12	0	29.41%
England A	1	0	1	0	0%
Gibraltar	1	0	0	1	0%
Hong Kong	15	2	13	0	13.33%
Hong Kong A	2	0	2	0	0%
India	4	4	0	0	100%
Japan	1	0	1	0	0%
Junior Japan	6	0	6	0	0%
Kazakhstan	4	1	3	0	25%
Laos	1	1	0	0	100%
Malaysia	15	11	4	0	73.33%
Philippines	8	1	7	0	12.5%
South Korea	9	1	8	0	11.11%
Sri Lanka	13	4	8	1	30.77%
Thailand	22	9	11	2	40.91%
United Arab Emirates	1	1	0	0	100%
Total	127	43	79	5	33.86%

== Makeup of the National Team ==
The current makeup of the National Team sees a mix of local born and bred Singaporean players and expatriates who fulfil World Rugby eligibility rules. The entirety of the team is based in Singapore, and are selected from all the Premiership clubs that play in the top division of the local league organised by the Singapore Rugby Union. While there has been past selection debates on an over reliance of expatriate players, the local development programme (National Rugby Academy) has seen success only at age group levels and hence see more local players through the ranks.
