= Sri Lanka national rugby union team =

Sri Lanka
- Nicknames: Tuskers; Brave Elephants
- Emblem: Elephant
- Union: Sri Lanka Rugby
- Head coach: Rodney Gibbs
- Captain: Nigel Ratwatte
- Most caps: Srinath Sooriyabandara (74)
First colours	Second colours

World Rugby ranking
- Current: 49 (as of 14 September 2026)
- Highest: 37 (29 June 2015)
- Lowest: 64 (26 April 2004)

First international
- All Ceylon 6–33 New Zealand (Colombo, Ceylon; 12 September 1907)

Biggest win
- Sri Lanka 77–3 Malaysia (Colombo, Sri Lanka; 7 November 2007)

Biggest defeat
- Japan 129–6 Sri Lanka (Ulsan, South Korea; 9 October 2002)

World Cup
- Appearances: 0
- Website: srilankarugby.lk

The Sri Lanka national rugby union team, known as the Tuskers, represents Sri Lanka in men's international rugby union. The team has yet to make their debut at the Rugby World Cup. They have the longest tradition of organised club rugby in Asia, dating back to 1879, which was just 8 years after the founding of the world's first rugby union in England. They regularly compete in the Asian Five Nations tournament and are currently in Division I. In the 2010 tournament, they made it to the finals beating Chinese Taipei 37 to 7.

== History ==
=== 19th century ===
Sri Lanka Rugby has a long history, dating back to the days of British colonialism. Colombo Football Club was the first rugby club in Sri Lanka, established on 28 June 1879. Kingswood college, Kandy was the first to introduce Rugby at school level. The first recorded school rugby game was between Kingswood College, Kandy and Trinity College, Kandy in 1906. Rugby having been introduced to Kingswood College in 1893 by the founder of school, Edmund Louise Blaze, a former student of Trinity College, Kandy.

=== 20th century ===
The nation's first "national" match was on 12 September 1907 and involved an All Ceylon team against the professional All Blacks (the New Zealand rugby league team) under rugby union rules on their 1907–1908 New Zealand rugby tour of Australia and Great Britain. The professional All Blacks won the match 33–6. The Ceylon Rugby Football Union was founded 10 August 1908. In 1974 it changed its name to the Sri Lanka Rugby Football Union.

In 1932 the Ceylon RFU XV won the All India Cup at all India Rugby Football Tournament. Both the 1930 and the 1950 British Lions tour to New Zealand and Australia played unofficial matches in Ceylon on their way home.

Mahesh Rodrigo, better known as an international cricketer, also captained the national team.

In 1994, Sri Lanka entered into their first World Cup qualification tournament for a spot at the 1995 Rugby World Cup. They were drawn in Group A with Japan, Taiwan and Malaysia. After only losing by five points to Malaysia, they would concede 92 more points against the other two teams in the group to finish bottom of the group with no points. In 1997, Sri Lanka participated in the opening round of 1999 Rugby World Cup qualifying. After defeating Thailand and Singapore in the opening round, they next took on Chinese Taipei and Malaysia with the winner going through to the third round. After knocking off Malaysia by 22 points in Kuala Lumpur in their opening match, they would be eliminated after losing to Chinese Taipei 31–27 which gave Chinese Taipei the spot into the third round.

=== 21st century ===
The furthest they have made was to Round 2 of the Asian qualifying competition for the 2007 Rugby World Cup in France. The Sri Lanka rugby team performed above expectations during the qualifying campaign for the World Cup, and saw their world ranking improve from 68th to 43rd place, and its Asian ranking improve to fifth place.

2008 was the first year of Asian Five Nations, which replaced the ARFU Asian Rugby Championship and the ARFU Asian Rugby Series. At the Divisional tournament Sri Lanka finished third, drawing against Singapore and losing to Chinese Taipei. The Chinese team withdrew from the tournament due to lack of visa availability and were relegated to Division Two.

In 2009 Sri Lanka again finished third in the Divisional tournament defeating Thailand (51–17) in the third-place final, remaining in Division One. Sri Lanka won Division One of the 2010 Divisional tournament beating Singapore (23–16) in the final, thereby winning promotion to the 2011 Asian Five Nations for the first time.

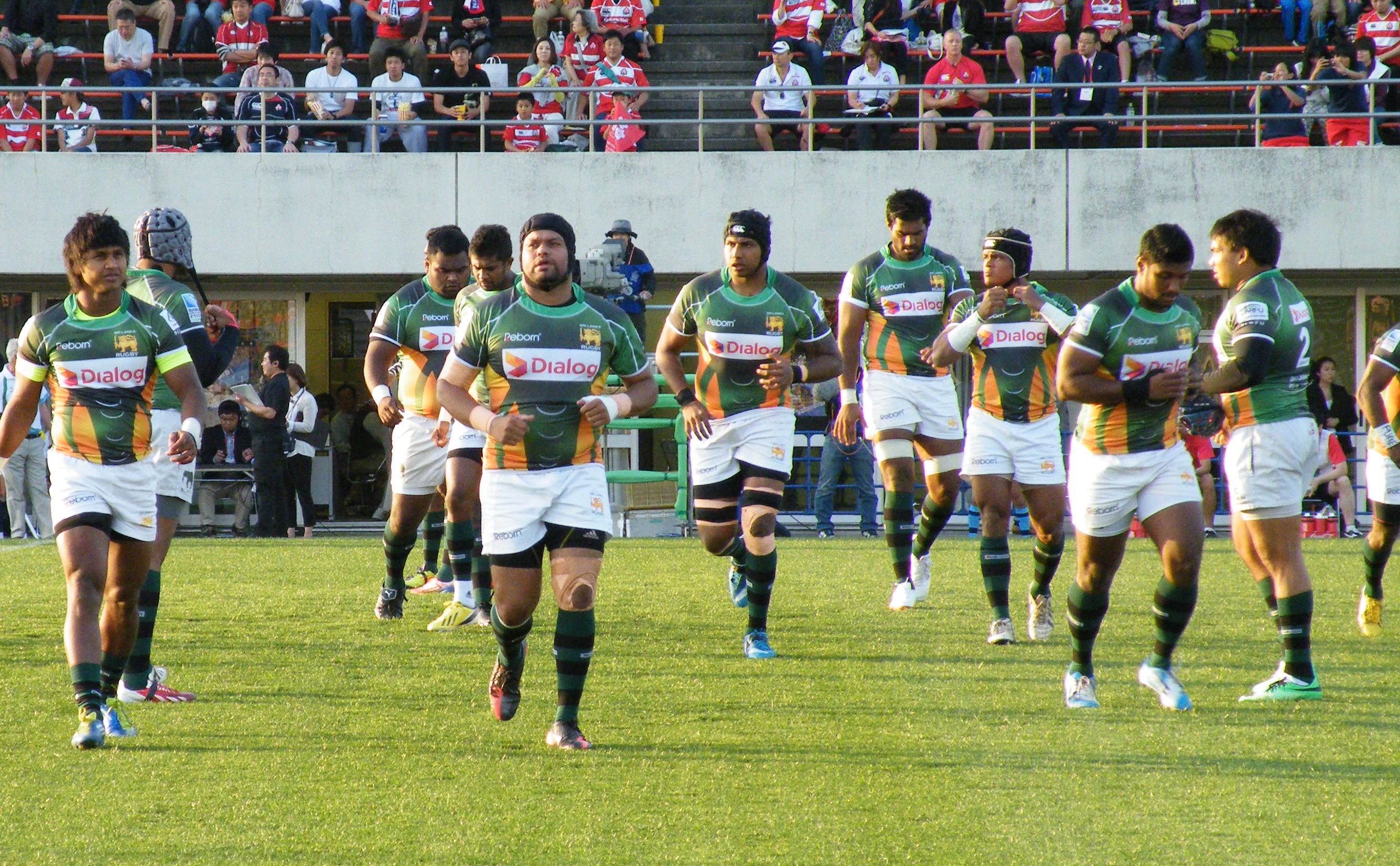
The national team in 2014

Despite a drawn match with United Arab Emirates (13–13), Sri Lanka lost its remaining three matches in the 2011 Asian Five Nations tournament and finished last, resulting in its demotion out of the Asian Five Nations. In the 2012 Division tournament the team won two matches but were defeated by the Philippines, which meant Sri Lanka missed out on promotion and remained in Division One. At the 2013 Division tournament held in Colombo, Sri Lanka were successful in winning all three of its matches earning a promotion to the Asian Five Nations. In 2014 Sri Lanka lost all four of its matches in the Asian Five Nations and were relegated back to Division One.

At the 2015 Division tournament held in the Philippines in May, Sri Lanka beat the Philippines 27–14 to become the champions of the Asian Division 1, resulting in the team qualifying to compete in a challenge match, in June, against the third ranked Asian team and a potential spot in the 2016 Asian Championship. Due to financial reasons, the challenge game was cancelled with South Korea remaining in the tri-nations division and Sri Lanka in the Division 1 competition for 2016. In 2016 Sri Lanka finished second at the Division tournament held in Kuala Lumpur, Malaysia in May. Sri Lanka defeated both Singapore and the Philippines but lost to hosts Malaysia.

In the 2020s, the Sri Lanka national rugby union team continued to make strides in Asian rugby. In 2024, they won the Asia Rugby Division 1 Championship, defeating India 45-10 and Kazakhstan 45–7 in the final. This success led to a playoff match against Malaysia on April 19, 2025, which Sri Lanka won 59–19, securing their place in the top tier of the 2025 Asia Rugby Emirates Men's Championship. This tournament is significant as the winner will qualify directly for the Rugby World Cup 2027, presenting a historic opportunity for Sri Lanka to make their World Cup debut. The team also hosted the New Zealand U85kg team for two matches in May 2025, providing valuable international experience despite losing both games.

== Home grounds ==
- Colombo Racecourse International Arena (Main Ground)
- CR & FC Grounds – Colombo 7
- CH & FC Grounds – Colombo 7
- Police Grounds – Colombo 5
- Army Grounds – Galle Face
- Nittawela Rugby Stadium – Kandy
- Air Force Grounds – Ratmalana
- Navy Grounds – Welisara
- Havelock Park – Havelock Town
- Maligawa Grounds – Kurunegala
- Bogambara Stadium – Kandy
- Peoples' Park – Anuradhapura
- Slim Line Grounds – Pannala
- Vincent Dias Stadium – Badulla
- Army Grounds – Anuradhapura

== Players ==
=== Current squad ===
Backs
Player	Position	Club
Heshan Jansen	Scrum-half	Kandy SC
Mohammad Rifan	Scrum-half	Havelock SC
Nigel Ratwatte	Fly-half	Kandy SC
Thenuka Nanayakkara	Fly-half	CR&FC
Akash Madushanka	Inside Centre	Police SC
Danushka Ranjan	Outside Centre	Kandy SC
Hirantha Perera	Inside Centre	Police SC
Dinal Ekanayake	Right Wing	Kandy SC
Janidu Dilshan	Left Wing	CH&FC
Mursheed Zubair Dore	Fullback	CR&FC
Pasindu Bandara	Fullback	CH&FC
Tharinda Rathwatte	Fly Half	Kandy SC

Forwards
Player	Position	Club
Pulasthi Dasanayake	Hooker	CH&FC
Venura Kodagoda	Hooker	CR&FC
Janindu Fernando	Loosehead Prop	Havelock SC
Senura Perera	Tighthead Prop	CR&FC
Vimukthi Gamage	Loosehead Prop	CH&FC
Thanuja Jayaweera	Tighthead Prop	CR&FC
Naveen Marasinghe	Lock	CR&FC
Thilina Bandara	Lock	Kandy SC
Nirosh Perera	Lock	CH&FC
Nizraan Nilar	Blindside Flanker	Sri Lions SC
Tharindu Chathuranga	Openside Flanker	Openside Flanker
Lasindu Karunathilake	Number 8	CR&FC
Dahan Wickramarachchi	Number 8	Kandy SC
Omalka Gunaratne	Fly Half	CR&FC

== Officials ==
=== Coaches ===
- Head Coach: Rodney Gibbs (2025)

=== Council Members ===
- SLR President - Nalin de Silva
- Deputy and Vice Presidents - Roshan Dean and S.W. Chang
- Secretary - Waruna de Silva
- Executive Director - Hamza Hidayathullah

=== Former coaches ===
- (New Zealand) George Simpkin (?-?)
- (New Zealand) Willie Hetaraka (September 2006-?)
- (New Zealand) Tavita Tulagaese (?-)
- (New Zealand) Rob Yule (March 2007–August 2008)
- (South Africa) Dawie Snyman (August 2008–April 2010)
- (New Zealand) John Carrington (2009)
- (South Africa) Johan Taylor (? -January 2011)
- (New Zealand) Ellis Meachen (January 2011–March 2012)
- (South Africa) Ravin Du Plessis (January 2013–?)
- (Sri Lanka) Inthi Marikar (2009–2010)
- (Sri Lanka) Leonard de Zilwa (2014–2015)
- (Sri Lanka) Tony Amit (?-?)
- (South Africa) Johan Taylor (2015–2019)

Assistant coaches

- (Samoa) Tavita Tulagaese
- (Sri Lanka) C. P. Abeygunawardene
- (South Africa) Norman Laker (August 2008–April 2010)

== Overall record ==
Below is a table of the representative rugby matches played by a Sri Lanka national XV at test level up until 24 May 2026, updated after match with Hong Kong.

Opponent	Played	Won	Lost	Drawn	% Won
Arabian Gulf	2	0	2	0	0%
Australia A	4	0	4	0	0%
British & Irish Lions	2	0	2	0	0%
China	6	5	1	0	83.33%
England A	2	0	2	0	0%
Hong Kong	12	0	12	0	0%
Hong Kong A	1	1	0	0	100%
India	3	3	0	0	100%
Japan	3	0	3	0	0%
Japan XV	8	0	8	0	0%
Kazakhstan	10	4	6	0	40%
Laos	1	1	0	0	100%
Madagascar	1	0	1	0	0%
Malaysia	21	14	7	0	66.67%
Māori	1	0	1	0	0%
Junior All Blacks	4	0	4	0	0%
Pakistan	1	1	0	0	100%
Papua New Guinea	2	0	2	0	0%
Philippines	6	3	3	0	50%
Poland	1	1	0	0	100%
Singapore	13	8	4	1	61.54%
South Korea	11	0	11	0	0%
Chinese Taipei	14	6	8	0	42.86%
Thailand	14	9	4	1	64.29%
United Arab Emirates	3	1	1	1	33.33%
Total	145	55	87	3	37.67%

=== Upcoming Matches ===
24 May 2026
15:00 SLST (UTC+5:30)

Sri Lanka	v	Hong Kong

Colombo Racecourse, Colombo

5 June 2026
14:45 UAEST (UTC+4)

United Arab Emirates	v	Sri Lanka

The Sevens Stadium, Dubai

13 June 2026
15:00 KST (UTC+9)

South Korea	v	Sri Lanka

Incheon Namdong Asiad Rugby Field, Incheon

=== Recent results ===
Date	Tournament	Location	Venue	Opponent	Result	Score
4 July 2025	Asia Rugby Emirates Men’s Championship 2025	Colombo	Colombo Racecourse	United Arab Emirates	Loss	21-29
22 June 2025	Asia Rugby Emirates Men’s Championship 2025	Hong Kong	Kai Tak Youth Sports Ground	Hong Kong	Loss	07-78
13 June 2025	Asia Rugby Emirates Men’s Championship 2025	Colombo	Colombo Racecourse	South Korea	Loss	34-38
10 May 2025	Sir Graham Henry Trophy	Colombo	Colombo Racecourse	New Zealand U85kg	Loss	6-32
4 May 2025	Sir Graham Henry Trophy	Kandy	Nittawela Rugby Stadium	New Zealand U85kg	Loss	10-50
19 April 2025	2025 Asia Rugby Men's Championship Qualifiers	Colombo	Colombo Racecourse	Malaysia	Win	59-19
4 May 2024	2024 Asia Rugby Division 1 Championship final	Colombo	Colombo Racecourse	Kazakhstan	Win	45-7
30 April 2024	2024 Asia Rugby Division 1 Championship	Colombo	Colombo Racecourse	India	Win	45-10
2019	Friendly	Kuala Lumpur	Bukit Jalil National Stadium	Malaysia	Loss	26-31
1 June 2019	2019 Asian Rugby Championship division 1	Taipei	Municipal Stadium	Chinese Taipei	Win	72-17
29 May 2019	2019 Asian Rugby Championship division 1	Taipei	Municipal Stadium	Philippines	Loss	22-39
14 May 2016	2016 Asian Rugby Championship division 1	Kuala Lumpur	Royal Selangor Stadium	Philippines	Win	25-21
11 May 2016	2016 Asian Rugby Championship division 1	Kuala Lumpur	Royal Selangor Stadium	Malaysia	Loss	17-42
8 May 2016	2016 Asian Rugby Championship division 1	Kuala Lumpur	Royal Selangor Stadium	Singapore	Win	33-17
9 May 2015	2015 Asian Rugby Championship division 1	Bocaue, Bulacan	Philippine Sports Stadium	Philippines	Win	27–14
6 May 2015	2015 Asian Rugby Championship division 1	Bocaue, Bulacan	Philippine Sports Stadium	Kazakhstan	Win	35-14

Green background indicates a win. Red background indicates a loss. Yellow background indicates a draw.
