= 2004 in rugby union =

2004 in rugby union covers the major events in the sport of rugby union during the year. France won the 2004 Six Nations Championship with a Grand Slam, while South Africa won the 2004 Tri Nations Series. ACT Brumbies and London Wasps won the Super 12 and Heineken Cup respectively.

== International tournaments ==
- 2004 Six Nations Championship: France won the championship and the Grand Slam; Ireland finished second.
- 2004 Tri Nations Series: South Africa won the title, with New Zealand finishing second and Australia third.
- 2004 Pacific Tri-Nations: Fiji won the tournament; Samoa finished second.
- 2004 ARFU Asian Rugby Championship: Japan won the tournament, with South Korea finishing second.

== International results ==
Complete list of fixtures involving national teams during 2004.

=== February ===
Date	Home team	Result	Away team	Venue	Competition	Source
14 February	France	35–17	Ireland	Stade de France, Saint-Denis	Six Nations Championship	
14 February	Wales	23–10	Scotland	Millennium Stadium, Cardiff	Six Nations Championship	
14 February	Romania	55–11	Czech Republic	Stadionul Dinamo, Bucharest	European Nations Cup	
14 February	Russia	36–6	Spain	Stadion Yunost, Krasnodar	European Nations Cup	
14 February	(Georgia (country)) Georgia	14–19	Portugal	Boris Paichadze National Stadium, Tbilisi	European Nations Cup	
15 February	Italy	9–50	England	Stadio Flaminio, Rome	Six Nations Championship	
21 February	France	25–0	Italy	Stade de France, Saint-Denis	Six Nations Championship	
21 February	Scotland	13–35	England	Murrayfield Stadium, Edinburgh	Six Nations Championship	
21 February	Romania	36–6	Portugal	Stadionul 1 Mai, Constanța	European Nations Cup	
22 February	Ireland	36–15	Wales	Lansdowne Road, Dublin	Six Nations Championship	
22 February	Spain	6–6	(Georgia (country)) Georgia	Estadi Municipal de Reus, Reus	European Nations Cup	
28 February	Morocco	27–7	Namibia	Terrain du COC, Casablanca	Africa Cup	
28 February	Cayman Islands	41–14	Jamaica	George Town	Mayfair Cup	

=== March ===
Date	Home team	Result	Away team	Venue	Competition	Source
6 March	England	13–19	Ireland	Twickenham Stadium, London	Six Nations Championship	
6 March	Italy	20–14	Scotland	Stadio Flaminio, Rome	Six Nations Championship	
6 March	Romania	50–10	Spain	Stadionul Dinamo, Bucharest	European Nations Cup	
6 March	(Georgia (country)) Georgia	9–3	Russia	Boris Paichadze National Stadium, Tbilisi	European Nations Cup	
6 March	Czech Republic	8–13	Portugal	Tatra Smíchov Rugby Club, Prague	European Nations Cup	
7 March	Wales	22–29	France	Millennium Stadium, Cardiff	Six Nations Championship	
7 March	Ivory Coast	8–3	Tunisia	Abidjan	Africa Cup	
17 March	Belgium	10–18	Netherlands	Visé	Friendly	
20 March	England	31–21	Wales	Twickenham Stadium, London	Six Nations Championship	
20 March	Ireland	19–3	Italy	Lansdowne Road, Dublin	Six Nations Championship	
20 March	Russia	33–24	Romania	Stadion Yunost, Krasnodar	European Nations Cup	
20 March	(Georgia (country)) Georgia	23–7	Czech Republic	Boris Paichadze National Stadium, Tbilisi	European Nations Cup	
21 March	Scotland	0–31	France	Murrayfield Stadium, Edinburgh	Six Nations Championship	
21 March	Spain	19–35	Portugal	Estadio Municipal de Can Misses, Ibiza	European Nations Cup	
27 March	France	24–21	England	Stade de France, Saint-Denis	Six Nations Championship	
27 March	Ireland	37–16	Scotland	Lansdowne Road, Dublin	Six Nations Championship	
27 March	Wales	44–10	Italy	Millennium Stadium, Cardiff	Six Nations Championship	
27 March	Romania	25–18	(Georgia (country)) Georgia	Agronomia Stadium, Iași	European Nations Cup	
27 March	Portugal	19–18	Russia	Estádio Universitário de Coimbra, Coimbra	European Nations Cup	
27 March	Czech Republic	16–6	Spain	Tatra Smíchov Rugby Club, Prague	European Nations Cup	
27 March	Belgium	3–32	Switzerland	Brussels	European Nations Cup	
27 March	Denmark	8–12	Netherlands	Fredericia	Friendly	
27 March	Morocco	11–6	Ivory Coast	Terrain du COC, Casablanca	Africa Cup	

=== April ===
Date	Home team	Result	Away team	Venue	Competition	Source
9 April	Arabian Gulf	14–13	Kazakhstan	Doha	International match	
10 April	Netherlands	14–13	Germany	National Rugby Centre Amsterdam, Amsterdam	European Nations Cup	
10 April	Denmark	25–19	Belgium	Odense	European Nations Cup	
10 April	Serbia and Montenegro	31–3	Hungary	FC Bačka ground, Subotica	European Nations Cup	
10 April	Tunisia	20–3	Cameroon	Stade Rugby El Menzah, Tunis	Africa Cup	
17 April	Croatia	22–11	Denmark	Mladost Ground, Zagreb	European Nations Cup	
17 April	Switzerland	21–18	Slovenia	Geneva	European Nations Cup	
17 April	Moldova	26–12	Latvia	Chișinău	European Nations Cup	
17 April	Malta	20–18	Serbia and Montenegro	Marsa Sports Ground, Marsa	European Nations Cup	
24 April	Morocco	17–7	Tunisia	Stade Olympique de Casablanca, Casablanca	Africa Cup	
24 April	Belgium	14–3	Croatia	Marchienne-au-Pont	European Nations Cup	
24 April	Luxembourg	39–5	Bulgaria	Stade Boy Konen, Cessange	European Nations Cup	
24 April	Latvia	8–10	Malta	Latvijas Universitātes stadions, Riga	European Nations Cup	
25 April	Germany	40–0	Sweden	Rudolf-Kalweit-Stadion, Hanover	European Nations Cup	
25 April	Netherlands	29–18	Poland	National Rugby Centre Amsterdam, Amsterdam	European Nations Cup	
25 April	Argentina	45–3	Chile	Prince of Wales Country Club, Santiago	South American Rugby Championship	
25 April	Uruguay	92–8	Venezuela	Prince of Wales Country Club, Santiago	South American Rugby Championship	
28 April	Argentina	69–10	Uruguay	Prince of Wales Country Club, Santiago	South American Rugby Championship	
28 April	Chile	95–3	Venezuela	Prince of Wales Country Club, Santiago	South American Rugby Championship	

=== May ===
Date	Home team	Result	Away team	Venue	Competition	Source
1 May	Cayman Islands	43–8	(The Bahamas) Bahamas	George Town	Becks Cup	
1 May	Sweden	3–41	Ukraine	Vänersborg	European Nations Cup	
1 May	Argentina	147–7	Venezuela	Prince of Wales Country Club, Santiago	South American Rugby Championship	
1 May	Chile	13–20	Uruguay	Prince of Wales Country Club, Santiago	South American Rugby Championship	
1 May	Ivory Coast	17–10	Cameroon	Abidjan	Africa Cup	
1 May	Tanzania	57–3	Burundi	Friedkin Recreation Ground, Arusha	African Development Trophy	
7 May	Malaysia	3–48	Arabian Gulf	Kuala Lumpur	2007 Rugby World Cup qualifying – Asia	
8 May	Sweden	0–16	Netherlands	Stockholm	European Nations Cup	
8 May	Serbia and Montenegro	20–43	Moldova	Belgrade	European Nations Cup	
8 May	Austria	18–19	Luxembourg	Vienna	European Nations Cup	
9 May	Japan A	62–9	Chinese Taipei	Tainan Rugby Ground, Tainan	Asian Rugby Championship	
9 May	Hong Kong	12–5	Arabian Gulf	Hong Kong	Asian Rugby Championship	
15 May	Ukraine	22–0	Netherlands	Kyiv	European Nations Cup	
15 May	Lithuania	66–9	Bulgaria	Šiauliai	European Nations Cup	
16 May	Japan	19–19	South Korea	Chichibunomiya Rugby Stadium, Tokyo	Asian Rugby Championship	
16 May	Germany	34–10	Poland	Heidelberg	European Nations Cup	
16 May	Kazakhstan	44–19	Malaysia	Almaty	Asian Rugby Championship	
22 May	Malta	35–27	Hungary	Marsa Sports Ground, Marsa	European Nations Cup	
22 May	Bulgaria	13–28	Austria	Sofia	European Nations Cup	
22 May	South Korea	99–18	Chinese Taipei	Seoul	Asian Rugby Championship	
22 May	Singapore	14–47	Hong Kong	Singapore	Asian Rugby Championship	
27 May	United States	20–23	Canada	National Stadium, Tokyo	2004 Super Powers Cup	
27 May	Japan	29–12	Russia	National Stadium, Tokyo	2004 Super Powers Cup	
29 May	Samoa	24–14	Tonga	Apia Park, Apia	Pacific Tri-Nations	
29 May	Cameroon	6–18	Morocco	Yaoundé	Africa Cup	
29 May	Moldova	22–8	Malta	Chișinău	European Nations Cup	
30 May	Japan	34–21	Canada	Chichibunomiya Rugby Stadium, Tokyo	2004 Super Powers Cup	
30 May	United States	41–11	Russia	Chichibunomiya Rugby Stadium, Tokyo	2004 Super Powers Cup	

=== June ===
Date	Home team	Result	Away team	Venue	Competition	Source
2 June	Israel	24–15	Finland	Beauvais	European Nations Cup	
2 June	Armenia	36–6	Norway	Beauvais	European Nations Cup	
4 June	Scotland	38–3	Samoa	Westpac Stadium,Wellington	International match	
5 June	Tonga	26–27	Fiji	Teufaiva Sport Stadium, Nukuʻalofa	Pacific Tri-Nations	
5 June	Austria	23–12	Lithuania	Vienna	European Nations Cup	
5 June	Armenia	48–0	Israel	Beauvais	European Nations Cup	
5 June	Norway	54–7	Finland	Beauvais	European Nations Cup	
5 June	Hong Kong	27–9	China	Hong Kong Stadium, Hong Kong	International match	
5 June	Tanzania	53–12	Rwanda	Friedkin Recreation Ground, Arusha	African Development Trophy	
7 June	Mali	40–12	Burkina Faso	Dakar	African Development Trophy	
7 June	Senegal	59–0	Mauritania	Dakar	African Development Trophy	
9 June	Senegal	23–6	Burkina Faso	Dakar	African Development Trophy	
9 June	Mali	81–0	Mauritania	Dakar	African Development Trophy	
12 June	New Zealand	36–3	England	Carisbrook, Dunedin	International match	
12 June	South Africa	31–17	Ireland	Free State Stadium, Bloemfontein	International match	
12 June	Argentina	50–44	Wales	Estadio Monumental José Fierro, San Miguel de Tucumán	International match	
12 June	Samoa	3–29	Fiji	Apia Park, Apia	Pacific Tri-Nations	
12 June	New Zealand Māori	69–31	United States	Calgary Rugby Park, Calgary	Churchill Cup	
12 June	Bosnia and Herzegovina	17–23	Austria		European Nations Cup	
12 June	China	24–24	Singapore	Shanghai	International match	
12 June	Mali	15–6	Senegal	Dakar	African Development Trophy	
12 June	Burkina Faso	49–0	Mauritania	Dakar	African Development Trophy	
13 June	Australia	35–15	Scotland	Docklands Stadium, Melbourne	International match	
13 June	England A	48–23	Canada	Calgary Rugby Park, Calgary	Churchill Cup	
19 June	New Zealand	36–12	England	Eden Park, Auckland	International match	
19 June	Australia	34–13	Scotland	Stadium Australia, Sydney	International match	
19 June	South Africa	26–17	Ireland	Newlands Stadium, Cape Town	International match	
19 June	Argentina	20–35	Wales	José Amalfitani Stadium, Buenos Aires	International match	
19 June	Canada	32–29	United States	Commonwealth Stadium, Edmonton	Churchill Cup	
19 June	New Zealand Māori	26–19	England A	Commonwealth Stadium, Edmonton	Churchill Cup	
22 June	Sri Lanka	54–17	India	Mumbai	Asia Rugby Championship	
26 June	Australia	51–15	England	Lang Park, Brisbane	Cook Cup	
26 June	South Africa	53–18	Wales	Loftus Versfeld Stadium, Pretoria	International match	
26 June	New Zealand	41–7	Argentina	Waikato Stadium, Hamilton	International match	
26 June	Romania	25–24	Italy	Stadionul Lia ManoliuBucharest	International match	
26 June	Thailand	86–12	India	Bangkok	Asia Rugby Championship	
28 June	Benin	11–5	Togo	Lomé	African Development Trophy	
29 June	Nigeria	20–0	Ghana	Lomé	African Development Trophy	

=== July ===
Date	Home team	Result	Away team	Venue	Competition	Source
1 July	Nigeria	45–3	Benin	Lomé	African Development Trophy	
1 July	Togo	15–5	Ghana	Lomé	African Development Trophy	
3 July	United States	31–39	France	Dillon Stadium, Hartford	International match	
3 July	Australia	29–14	Pacific Islanders	Adelaide Oval, Adelaide	International match	
3 July	Ghana	3–3	Benin	Lomé	African Development Trophy	
3 July	Togo	0–0	Nigeria	Lomé	African Development Trophy	
3 July	Rwanda	18–15	Burundi	Kigali	African Development Trophy	
4 July	Japan	19–32	Italy	Chichibunomiya Rugby Stadium, Tokyo	International match	
10 July	Canada	13–47	France	York Stadium, Toronto	International match	
10 July	New Zealand	41–26	Pacific Islanders	North Harbour Stadium,Albany	International match	
17 July	New Zealand	16–7	Australia	Westpac Stadium, Wellington	2004 Tri Nations Series	
17 July	South Africa	38–24	Pacific Islanders	Central Coast Stadium,Gosford	International match	
24 July	New Zealand	23–21	South Africa	Lancaster Park, Christchurch	2004 Tri Nations Series	
24 July	Zimbabwe	24–15	Kenya	Hartsfield Ground, Bulawayo	International match	
31 July	Australia	30–26	South Africa	Subiaco Oval, Perth	2004 Tri Nations Series	
31 July	Kenya	18–8	Uganda	RFUEA Ground, Nairobi	Elgon Cup	

=== August ===
Date	Home team	Result	Away team	Venue	Competition	Source
7 August	Australia	23–18	New Zealand	Stadium Australia, Sydney	2004 Tri Nations Series	
7 August	Botswana	3–50	Namibia	Gaborone	International match	
14 August	South Africa	40–26	New Zealand	Ellis Park Stadium, Johannesburg	2004 Tri Nations Series	
14 August	Zambia	10–52	Namibia	Lions Den, Chingola	Africa Cup	
14 August	Uganda	24–16	Madagascar	Kampala RFC Ground, Kampala	Africa Cup	
21 August	South Africa	23–19	Australia	Kings Park Stadium, Durban	2004 Tri Nations Series	
28 August	Cook Islands	50–5	Niue	Raemaru Park, Rarotonga	Oceania Cup	
29 August	Kenya	33–10	Zambia	RFUEA Grounds, Nairobi	Africa Cup	
29 August	Madagascar	23–18	Zimbabwe	Mahamasina Municipal Stadium, Antananarivo	Africa Cup	
31 August	Botswana	38–12	Tanzania	Gaborone	African Development Trophy	

=== September ===
Date	Home team	Result	Away team	Venue	Competition	Source
2 September	(Eswatini) Swaziland	36–0	Tanzania	Gaborone	African Development Trophy	
4 September	Andorra	76–3	Norway	MICG Ground, Andorra la Vella	2007 Rugby World Cup qualifying	
4 September	Botswana	25–22	(Eswatini) Swaziland	Gaborone	African Development Trophy	
11 September	Zimbabwe	17–0	Uganda	Harare Sports Club, Harare	Africa Cup	
11 September	Namibia	65–7	Kenya	Hage Geingob Rugby Stadium, Windhoek	Africa Cup	
18 September	Finland	3–42	Bulgaria	Helsinki	2007 Rugby World Cup qualifying	
18 September	Norway	9–23	Andorra	Bergen	2007 Rugby World Cup qualifying	
25 September	Namibia	68–8	Zimbabwe	Hage Geingob Rugby Stadium, Windhoek	Africa Cup	
25 September	Bosnia and Herzegovina	10–29	Austria	Zenica	2007 Rugby World Cup qualifying	

=== October ===
Date	Home team	Result	Away team	Venue	Competition	Source
2 October	Poland	20–15	Switzerland	Gdynia	2007 Rugby World Cup qualifying	
10 October	Paraguay	79–7	Colombia	São Paulo	South American Rugby Championship	
10 October	Brazil	73–3	Peru	São Paulo	2007 Rugby World Cup qualifying	
13 October	Paraguay	74–0	Peru	São Paulo	South American Rugby Championship	
13 October	Brazil	74–0	Colombia	São Paulo	2007 Rugby World Cup qualifying	
16 October	Austria	12–7	Bosnia and Herzegovina	Vienna	2007 Rugby World Cup qualifying	
16 October	Israel	0–53	Lithuania	Ra'anana	2007 Rugby World Cup qualifying	
16 October	Switzerland	8–17	Malta	Avusy	2007 Rugby World Cup qualifying	
16 October	Peru	15–10	Colombia	São Paulo	2007 Rugby World Cup qualifying	
16 October	Brazil	17–22	Paraguay	Estádio Ícaro de Castro Melo, São Paulo	South American Rugby Championship	
20 October	Belgium	11–24	Armenia	Visé	International match	
23 October	Croatia	27–6	Slovenia	Split	2007 Rugby World Cup qualifying	
23 October	Hungary	16–29	Andorra	Esztergom	2007 Rugby World Cup qualifying	
23 October	Latvia	18–20	Sweden	Valmiera	2007 Rugby World Cup qualifying	
23 October	Lithuania	60–7	Israel	Vilnius	2007 Rugby World Cup qualifying	
23 October	Vanuatu	17–14	New Caledonia	Port Vila	Oceania Cup	
27 October	Sri Lanka	75–3	Pakistan	King's Park, Hong Kong	2004 ARFU Asian Rugby Championship	
27 October	China	50–15	India	King's Park, Hong Kong	2004 ARFU Asian Rugby Championship	
28 October	Thailand	37–36	Kazakhstan	Hong Kong Football Club Stadium, Hong Kong	2004 ARFU Asian Rugby Championship	
28 October	Singapore	32–6	Arabian Gulf	Hong Kong Football Club Stadium, Hong Kong	2004 ARFU Asian Rugby Championship	
28 October	South Korea	63–7	Chinese Taipei	Hong Kong Football Club Stadium, Hong Kong	2004 ARFU Asian Rugby Championship	
28 October	Japan XV	40–12	Hong Kong	Hong Kong Football Club Stadium, Hong Kong	2004 ARFU Asian Rugby Championship	
30 October	Chile	9–28	Portugal	Prince of Wales Country Club, Santiago	Intercontinental Cup	
30 October	Uruguay	17–7	(Georgia (country)) Georgia	Estadio Luis Franzini, Montevideo	Intercontinental Cup	
30 October	Belgium	23–16	Latvia	Boitsfort	2007 Rugby World Cup qualifying	
30 October	Bulgaria	50–3	Finland	Sofia	2007 Rugby World Cup qualifying	
30 October	Denmark	11–20	Moldova	Odense	2007 Rugby World Cup qualifying	
30 October	China	30–16	Sri Lanka	King's Park, Hong Kong	2004 ARFU Asian Rugby Championship	
30 October	India	56–3	Pakistan	King's Park, Hong Kong	2004 ARFU Asian Rugby Championship	
30 October	Kazakhstan	19–9	Arabian Gulf	Hong Kong Football Club Stadium, Hong Kong	2004 ARFU Asian Rugby Championship	
30 October	Singapore	31–24	Thailand	Hong Kong Football Club Stadium, Hong Kong	2004 ARFU Asian Rugby Championship	
31 October	Japan XV	29–0	South Korea	Hong Kong Football Club Stadium, Hong Kong	2004 ARFU Asian Rugby Championship	
31 October	Hong Kong	29–5	Chinese Taipei	Hong Kong Football Club Stadium, Hong Kong	2004 ARFU Asian Rugby Championship	
31 October	Sweden	32–20	Lithuania	Helsingborg	2007 Rugby World Cup qualifying	
31 October 2004	Macau	55–3	Pakistan	Hong Kong	Development match	

=== November ===
Date	Home team	Result	Away team	Venue	Competition	Source
6 November	Scotland	14–31	Australia	Murrayfield Stadium, Edinburgh	International match	
6 November	Wales	36–38	South Africa	Millennium Stadium, Cardiff	International match	
6 November	Italy	51–6	Canada	Stadio Tommaso Fattori, L'Aquila	International match	
6 November	Fiji	25–34	New Zealand Divisional XV	National Stadium, Suva	International match	
6 November	Chile	30–24	(Georgia (country)) Georgia	Prince of Wales Country Club, Santiago	Intercontinental Cup	
6 November	Uruguay	30–3	Portugal	Estadio Luis Franzini, Montevideo	Intercontinental Cup	
6 November	Malta	13–38	Poland	Marsa	Qualificazioni alla Coppa del Mondo 2007	
6 November	Slovenia	41–0	Hungary	Ljubljana	Qualificazioni alla Coppa del Mondo 2007	
6 November	Peru	22–32	Venezuela	Lima	Qualificazioni alla Coppa del Mondo 2007	
12 November	Wales	66–7	Romania	Millennium Stadium, Cardiff	International match	
13 November	Ireland	17–12	South Africa	Lansdowne Road, Dublin	International match	
13 November	England	70–0	Canada	Twickenham Stadium, London	International match	
13 November	France	27–14	Australia	Stade de France, Saint-Denis	International match	
13 November	Italy	10–59	New Zealand	Stadio Flaminio, Rome	International match	
13 November	Scotland	100–8	Japan	McDiarmid Park, Perth	International match	
13 November	Fiji	61–22	New Zealand Divisional XV	Lautoka	International match	
13 November	Namibia	39–22	Morocco	Hage Geingob Rugby Stadium, Windhoek	Africa Cup	
13 November	Luxembourg	5–6	Denmark	Cessange	Qualificazioni alla Coppa del Mondo 2007	
13 November	Moldova	18–27	Germany	Chișinău	Qualificazioni alla Coppa del Mondo 2007	
13 November	Serbia and Montenegro	33–10	Bulgaria	Belgrade	Qualificazioni alla Coppa del Mondo 2007	
13 November	Colombia	27–31	Venezuela	Parque El Salitre, Bogotá	Qualificazioni alla Coppa del Mondo 2007	
20 November	England	32–16	South Africa	Twickenham Stadium, London	International match	
20 November	France	14–24	Argentina	Stade Vélodrome, Marseille	International match	
20 November	Scotland	17–31	Australia	Hampden Park, Glasgow	International match	
20 November	Wales	25–26	New Zealand	Millennium Stadium, Cardiff	International match	
20 November	Ireland	55–6	United States	Lansdowne Road, Dublin	International match	
20 November	Romania	25–10	Japan	Stadionul Steaua, Bucharest	International match	
20 November	Russia	15–27	(Georgia (country)) Georgia	Krasnodar	European Nations Cup	
20 November	Ukraine	16–36	Portugal	Spartak Stadium, Odesa	European Nations Cup	
20 November	Spain	63–9	Hungary	Madrid	Qualificazioni alla Coppa del Mondo 2007	
20 November	Croatia	18–7	Andorra	Sisak	Qualificazioni alla Coppa del Mondo 2007	
20 November	Venezuela	5–11	Brazil	Barquisimeto	Qualificazioni alla Coppa del Mondo 2007	
23 November	Mali	11–5	Nigeria	Bamako	Africa Cup, Division 2	
25 November	Botswana	37–0	Nigeria	Bamako	Africa Cup, Division 2	
26 November	Wales	98–0	Japan	Millennium Stadium, Cardiff	International match	
27 November	Ireland	21–19	Argentina	Lansdowne Road, Dublin	International match	
27 November	France	6–45	New Zealand	Stade de France, Saint-Denis	International match	
27 November	England	19–21	Australia	Twickenham Stadium, London	Cook Cup	
27 November	Scotland	10–45	South Africa	Murrayfield Stadium, Edinburgh	International match	
27 November	Italy	43–25	United States	Stadio Lamarmora, Biella	International match	
27 November	Czech Republic	14–38	Romania	Prague	European Nations Cup	
27 November	Botswana	12–6	Mali	Bamako	Africa Cup, Division 2	
27 November	Germany	96–0	Luxembourg	Fritz-Grunebaum-Stadium,Heidelberg	2007 Rugby World Cup qualifying	

=== December ===
Date	Home team	Result	Away team	Venue	Competition	Source
4 December	Argentina	7–39	South Africa	José Amalfitani Stadium, Buenos Aires	International match	

== See also ==
- 2004 in sports
- 2004 in rugby league
