= University of Agricultural Sciences and Veterinary Medicine =

University of Agricultural Sciences and Veterinary Medicine or University of Agronomic Sciences and Veterinary Medicine (Universitatea de Ştiinţe Agricole şi Medicină Veterinară or Universitatea de Ştiinţe Agronomice şi Medicină Veterinară; abbreviated USAMV) may refer to four educational institutions in Romania:

- University of Agronomic Sciences and Veterinary Medicine of Bucharest (Bucharest)
- University of Agricultural Sciences and Veterinary Medicine of Cluj-Napoca (Cluj-Napoca)
- Ion Ionescu de la Brad University of Agricultural Sciences and Veterinary Medicine of Iaşi (Iaşi)
- Banat University of Agricultural Sciences and Veterinary Medicine (Timişoara)
