= Ion Ionescu =

Ion Ionescu may refer to:

- Ion Ionescu (footballer, born 1938), Romanian footballer
- Ion Ionescu (footballer, born 1936) (1936–2024), Romanian footballer and coach
- Ion Ionescu de la Brad (1818–1891), Moldavian, later Romanian revolutionary, agronomist, statistician and writer
