= ACS USV Iași =

Romanian football club

USV Iași
- Full name: Asociația Club Sportiv USV Iași
- Nicknames: Ieșenii (The people from Iași); Studenții (The Students)
- Short name: USV
- Founded: 2022; 4 years ago
- Ground: Agronomia
- Capacity: 1,100 (seating)
- Owner: USV Iași
- Chairman: Vasile Stoleru
- Head coach: Cristian Ungureanu
- League: Liga III
- 2025–26: Liga III, Seria I, 7th
Home colours	Away colours

Asociația Club Sportiv USV Iași, also known as USV Iași, or just USV is a Romanian football club based in Iași, Iași County, which currently competes in Liga III, the third tier of Romanian football, following their promotion at the end of the 2023–24 season.

== History ==
The football team associated with the University of Life Sciences of Iași was founded in 2022 as ACS USV Iași and entered Liga IV – Iași County. In its second season, the club won the county championship and secured promotion to Liga III after defeating Prosport Vârfu Câmpului 4–1 on aggregate in the promotion play-off.

USV struggled in its first two Liga III campaigns. It was relegated on sporting merit at the end of 2024–25, but was reprieved following vacancies in the competition, and then avoided relegation again in 2025–26, securing its place in the third tier for a third consecutive season.

The summer of 2026 marked a major change for football in Iași. After Politehnica Iași failed to continue in Liga II, USV became the only senior club from the city competing in one of Romania's top three divisions. The Iași Local Council subsequently backed an association between CSM Iași 2020 and ACS USV Iași, with the aim of creating a stronger senior project capable of challenging for promotion to Liga II. However, the club continued to hold its Liga III place under the ACS USV Iași identity.

In the 2026–27 Cupa României, USV reached the Play-off round of the competition.

== Ground ==
USV Iași plays its home matches on Agronomia Stadium in Iași, Iași County, arena that has a capacity of 2,000 seats and it is situated inside Ion Ionescu de la Brad University of Life Sciences of Iași campus.

== Honours ==
Liga IV – Iași County

- Winners (1): 2023–24
- Runners-up (1): 2022–23

== Players ==
=== First team squad ===
As of 10 September 2024

Note: Flags indicate national team as defined under FIFA eligibility rules; some limited exceptions apply. Players may hold more than one non-FIFA nationality.

No.	Pos.	Nation	Player
1	GK	ROU	Teodor Cotea
2	DF	ROU	Dănuț Tăcuțanu
3	MF	ROU	Mihai Asofiei (Captain)
4	FW	ROU	Andrei Onofrei
5	MF	ROU	Denis Șerban
6	DF	ROU	Andrei Nechita
7	FW	ROU	Adrian Viorică
8	MF	ROU	Dumitru Șova
9	FW	ROU	Andrei Tănasă
10	MF	ROU	Alexandru Izmană
11	MF	ROU	Claudiu Donose
12	GK	ROU	Cosmin Anton
13	MF	ROU	Mario Turcu
14	FW	ROU	Eduard Sandu (Vice-Captain)
15	MF	ROU	Dan Condurache (on loan from Poli Iași)
16	MF	ROU	Iulian Curcă

No.	Pos.	Nation	Player
17	MF	ROU	Cosmin Privighitorița
18	MF	ROU	Matteo Dumitrașcu
19	FW	ROU	Codrin Safra-Groll
20	FW	ROU	Robert Tânăru
21	MF	ROU	Leonard Alexandru
22	FW	ROU	Mihai Cucoș
23	MF	ROU	Andrei Sărițanu
24	MF	ROU	Diitrie Ureche
25	MF	ROU	Ștefan Sîrbu
26	MF	ROU	David Diaconu
28	MF	ROU	Alexandru Taciuc
33	DF	ROU	Tudor Plop
98	GK	ROU	Alexandru Țențea
99	FW	ROU	Alexandru Marin

=== Out on loan ===
Note: Flags indicate national team as defined under FIFA eligibility rules; some limited exceptions apply. Players may hold more than one non-FIFA nationality.

No. / Pos. / Nation / Player	No. / Pos. / Nation / Player

== Club officials ==
=== Board of directors ===
Role	Name
Owners	(Romania) USV Iași
President	(Romania) Vasile Stoleru
Team Manager	(Romania) Corneliu Gorban

=== Current technical staff ===
Role	Name
Manager	(Romania) Cristian Ungureanu
Assistant coach	(Romania) Irinel Ionescu

== League and Cup history ==
Season	Tier	Division	Place	Notes	Cupa României
2026–27	3	Liga III	TBD		Play-off round
2025–26	3	Liga III (Seria I)	7th	Play-out	First round
2024–25	3	Liga III (Seria I)	9th	Spared from relegation	County phase – Final
2023–24	4	Liga IV (IS)	1st (C, P)	Promoted	Regional phase – Final
2022–23	4	Liga IV (IS)	2nd		County phase – Winners
