= Silvia Curteanu =

Romanian chemist

Silvia Curteanu, (Ph.D., 1998), is a Romanian chemist, who is active in the field of environmental science; she is a professor of the Gheorghe Asachi Technical University of Iași (TUIASI).

== Works ==
- Modelling and simulation applied to free radical polymerization (Ph.D. thesis, 1998)

== Literature ==
- Polymer Engineering / eds. Bartosz Tylkowski, Karolina Wieszczycka, Renata Jastrzab. — Berlin; Boston: De Gruyter, 2017. — 490 p. — ISBN 9783110469752. — ISBN 3110469758.
- Raluca-Maria Hlihor, Laura-Carmen Apostol, Maria Gavrilescu. Environmental Bioremediation by Biosorption and Bioaccumulation: Principles and Applications // Enhancing Cleanup of Environmental Pollutants. — Cham: Springer International Publishing, 2017. — P. 289–315. — ISBN 9783319554259. — DOI:10.1007/978-3-319-55426-6 14.

== Additional sources ==
- "Prof. Dr.Ing. Silvia Curteanu". Department of Chemical Engineering, Technical University of Iași. 26 February 2013.
