= David Banquet =

French rugby union player

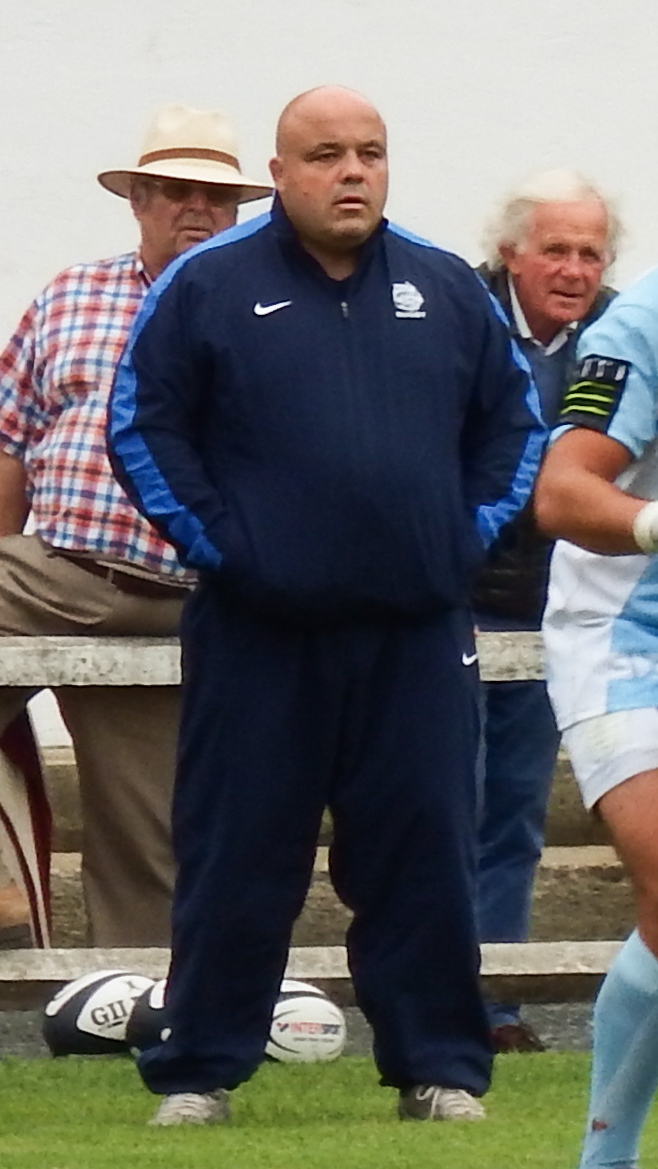
David Banquet, 2015

David Banquet, born 22 July 1974 in Libourne, is a French rugby union player who plays as right prop for RC Toulonnais (1.80 m, 122 kg).

== Career ==
- Libourne
- Mérignac
- 1992-1999 : AS Béziers
- 1999-2001 : US Dax
- 2001-2002 : AS Béziers
- 2002-2003 : CA Bègles-Bordeaux
- 2003 : USA Limoges
- 2003-2004 : RC Narbonne
- 2004-2006 : US Montauban
- Since 2006 : RC Toulon

== Honours ==
- Pro D2 Champions : 2006 with Montauban, 2008 with Toulon
