= Lion's Den =

Lion's Den or Lions' Den may refer to:

== Media ==
=== Literature ===
- The biblical episode of Daniel in the lions' den
- The Lion's Den, a 2009 World Fantasy Award-nominated novella by Steven Duffy
- The Lions' Den, a 2019 book by Susie Linfield

=== Movies ===
- The Lion's Den (1919 film), a 1919 American film starring Bert Lytell
- The Lion's Den (1936 film), a 1936 American western film starring Tim McCoy
- Lion's Den (1988 film), a 1988 short film by Bryan Singer
- Lion's Den (2008 film), a 2008 Argentine film by Pablo Trapero

=== Music ===
- "Lion's Den", a song on the Morbid Angel album, Covenant
- "Lion's Den", a song on the Bruce Springsteen album Tracks

=== Television ===
- "Lion's Den" (Out of the Blue), a 1995 episode
- "Lion's Den" (The Outer Limits), an episode of the seventh season of The Outer Limits
- The Lyon's Den, a short-lived TV show starring Rob Lowe

== Places ==
- Lion's Den (nightclub), a club in Greenwich Village, New York City
- Lion's Den, Zimbabwe, a village in the province of Mashonaland West, Zimbabwe
- Trinity College Rugby Stadium, also known as "Lion's Den", a rugby stadium located in Pallekele, Sri Lanka

== Other ==
- Lions' Den (militant group), a Palestinian militia group operating in the West Bank
- Lion's Den (mixed martial arts), the name of a mixed martial arts fighting team
- Lion's Den Match, a type of professional wrestling match
