= Faculty of Civil Engineering, Iași =

The Faculty of Civil Engineering and Building Services is an academic division of the Gheorghe Asachi Technical University of Iaşi, Romania, devoted to study and research in civil engineering.

== History ==
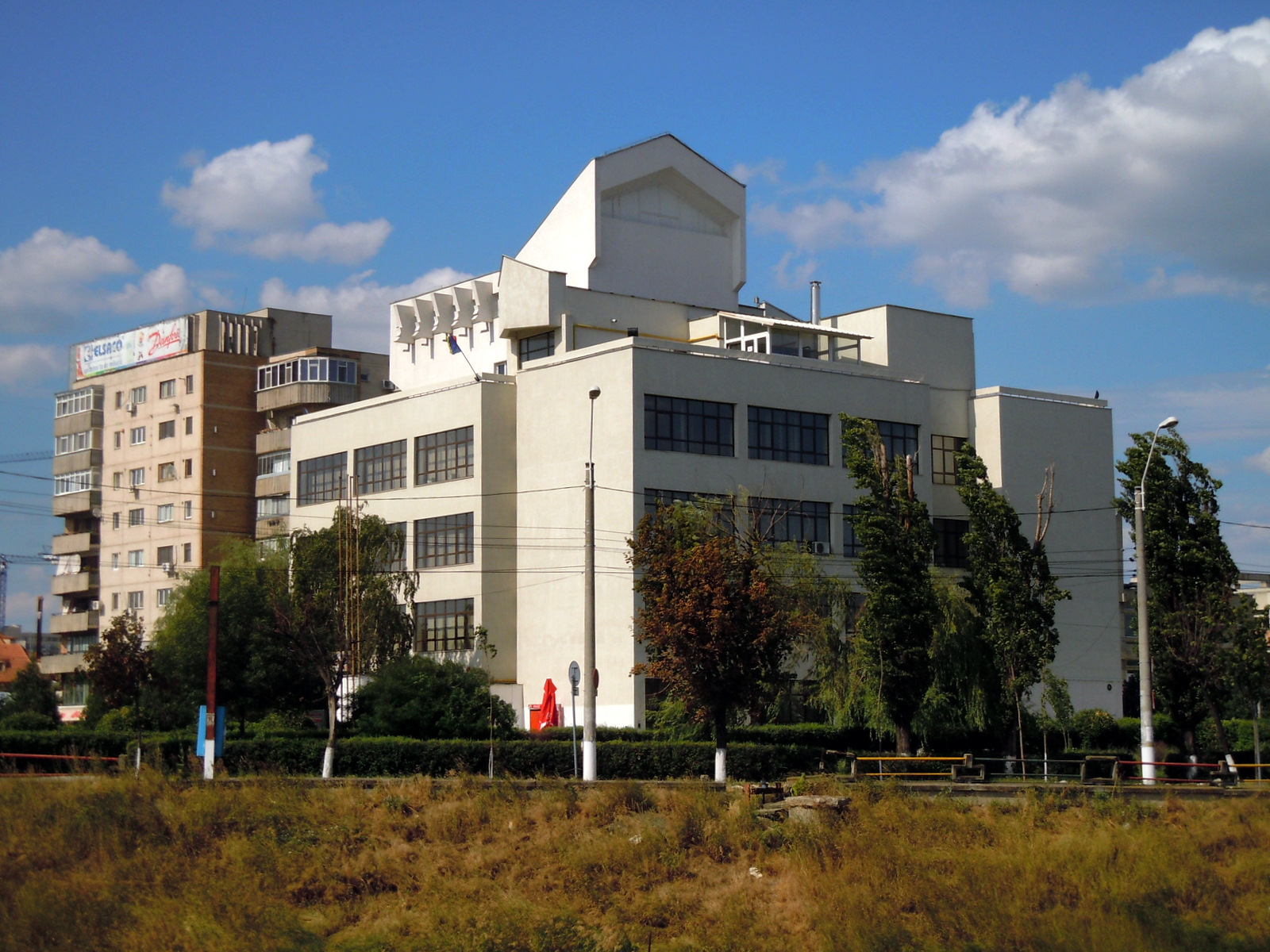
The main building

The Romanian engineering school was founded when Gheorghe Asachi succeeded in persuading the Prince Scarlat Callimachi of Moldavia to establish the foundations of a "class of surveyors and building engineers in Romania" on November 15, 1813.

As a result of Asachi's endeavours, the Michaelian Academy (in Romanian: Academia Mihăileană) was established in Iaşi between 1835 and 1847. Having amongst its scholars the most representative men of science at that time. This first official institution representing Romanian Higher Education in Moldova, succeeded in addressing local needs pertaining to the Higher Technical Syllabus.

Higher Education in Civil Engineering and Architecture in Iaşi was initiated and established by the great scholar Gheorghe Asachi in 1848 with the assistance of the Application School for Engineering and Constructions. It was only in 1941 that the Faculty of Civil Engineering (later included architectural studies) became part of the Higher Polytechnic School of Iaşi, which is known today as Gheorghe Asachi Technical University.

== Structure ==
- Department of Concrete Structures, Building Materials, Technology and Management
- Department of Transportation Infrastructure and Foundations
- Department of Civil and Industrial Engineering
- Department of Descriptive Geometry and Drawing
- Department of Building Services
- Department of Structural Mechanics

== Degrees awarded ==
The following Degrees are awarded in civil engineering and industrial engineering:

- Bachelor of Science
- Master of Science
- Doctor
