= Susie Linfield =

American author and academic

Susie Linfield is a social and cultural theorist at New York University.

== Background and education ==
Between the ages of 8 and 15 Linfield was a student at George Balanchine's School of American Ballet in New York City. She danced as a student in productions of the ballets Don Quixote, A Midsummer Night's Dream and in the Royal Ballet's New York production of The Nutcracker under the directorship of Rudolf Nureyev. She decided to continue her education at the Ethical Culture Fieldston School in New York City. Then earned a bachelor's degree in American history at Oberlin College in Ohio.

== Career ==
After college she moved to Boston where she ran the feminist newspaper Wages for Housework. She then moved to New York City where she studied journalism and documentary film-making at New York University. She has been a professor in the journalism department of New York University since 1995; for several years she was director of the cultural reporting and criticism program.

Linfield has served as editor-in-chief of American Film, deputy editor of The Village Voice and arts editor of The Washington Post.

== Books ==
=== The Lion's Den ===
Linfield is the author of The Lions' Den: Zionism and the Left from Hannah Arendt to Noam Chomsky (2019), in which she asserts that leading leftist intellectuals shaped antisemitism and anti-Israel attitudes that she argued pervade contemporary progressive discourse. Michael Fischbach in a review argued that Linfield is not an historian and makes serious errors of historical fact, while bringing her personal views to bear on the topic. She expects Palestinians, and leftist critics of Israel's policies, to forego aspirations for a Palestinian return from exile to their country, while justifying the appropriateness of precisely the same assertion for Jews in the case of Zionism's identical claim of a right of return.

Linfield's book, The Cruel Radiance: Photography and Political Violence (2011), was a finalist for the National Book Critics Circle Award in Criticism and won the Berlin Prize.
