= Agronomia Stadium =

Multi-use stadium in Iași, Romania

- Interactive map of Agronomia Stadium
- Address: Aleea Grigore Ghica Vodă 72
- Location: Iași, Romania
- Coordinates: 47°11′27.8″N 27°33′37.6″E
- Owner: USV Iași
- Operator: USV Iași
- Capacity: 1,100 on seats
- Surface: Grass

Tenants
- USV Iași (2022–present); Politehnica Iași (rugby)

The Agronomia Stadium is a multi-use stadium in Iași, Romania. It is used mostly for rugby and football matches, is the home ground of USV Iași and Politehnica Iași (rugby). The stadium holds 1,100 people on seats and is situated in the campus of Ion Ionescu de la Brad University of Life Sciences of Iași.
