= 2004 New Zealand rugby union tour of Europe =

Summary
P	W	D	L
Total
4	4	0	0
Test match
3	3	0	0
Opponent
P	W	D	L
Italy
1	1	0	0
Wales
1	1	0	0
France
1	1	0	0

The 2004 New Zealand rugby union tour of Europe was a series of matches played in November–December 2004 in Italy, France and Great Britain by New Zealand national rugby union team

== Results ==
13 November 2004

Italy	10–59	New Zealand
Try: Ma. Bergamasco; Con: Wakarua; Pen: Wakarua	Report	Try: Smith; Carter; Muliaina (2); Umaga (2); Taumoepeau; McCaw (2); Con: Carter (7)

Stadio Flaminio, Rome
Attendance: 25,000
Referee: Joel Jutge (France)

Italy: 15. Kaine Robertson, 14. Ludovico Nitoglia, 13. Pietro Travagli, 12. Matteo Barbini, 11. Matteo Pratichetti, 10. Silvio Orlando, 9. Paul Griffen, 8. Luciano Orquera, 7. Mauro Bergamasco, 6. Aaron Persico, 5. Santiago Dellapè, 4. Marco Bortolami (capt.), 3. Salvatore Perugini, 2. Fabio Ongaro, 1. Andrea Lo Cicero, – Replacements: 16. Giorgio Intoppa, 17. Salvatore Costanzo, 18. Enrico Pavanello, 19. Rima Wakarua, 20. Walter Pozzebon, 21. David dal Maso, 22. Gert Peens
New Zealand: 15. Mils Muliaina, 14. Rico Gear, 13. Conrad Smith, 12. Tana Umaga (capt), 11. Joe Rokocoko, 10. Dan Carter, 9. Byron Kelleher, 8. Mose Tuiali'i, 7. Richie McCaw, 6. Jerry Collins, 5. Norm Maxwell, 4. Chris Jack, 3. Carl Hayman, 2. Anton Oliver, 1. Saimone Taumoepeau, – Replacements: 16. Corey Flynn, 17. Greg Somerville, 18. Ali Williams, 19. Steven Bates, 20. Jimmy Cowan, 21. Aaron Mauger, 22. Ma'a Nonu

20 November 2004

Wales	25–26	New Zealand
Try: Shanklin; Davies; Pen: S. Jones (3); Henson (2)	Report	Try: Rokocoko (2); Muliaina; Con: Carter; Pen: Carter (3)

Stade de France, Paris
Attendance: 74,000
Referee: Tony Spreadbury (England)

Wales: 15. Gareth Thomas(capt.), 14. Tom Shanklin, 13. Sonny Parker, 12. Gavin Henson, 11. Shane Williams, 10. Stephen Jones, 9. Dwayne Peel, 8. Michael Owen, 7. Colin Charvis, 6. Dafydd Jones, 5. Gareth Llewellyn, 4. Brent Cockbain, 3. Adam Jones, 2. Mefin Davies, 1. Gethin Jenkins, – Replacements: 16. Steve Jones, 17. Duncan Jones, 18. Ryan Jones, 19. Martyn Williams, 20. Gareth Cooper – Unused: 21. Ceri Sweeney, 22. Rhys Williams
New Zealand: 15. Mils Muliaina, 14. Doug Howlett, 13. Casey Laulala, 12. Aaron Mauger, 11. Joe Rokocoko, 10. Dan Carter, 9. Piri Weepu, 8. Mose Tuiali'i, 7. Richie McCaw (capt.), 6. Rodney So'oialo, 5. Ali Williams, 4. Chris Jack, 3. Greg Somerville, 2. Keven Mealamu, 1. Tony Woodcock, – Replacements: 17. Carl Hayman, 20. Byron Kelleher, 21. Ma'a Nonu (yellow card) – Unused: 16. Anton Oliver, 18. Reuben Thorne, 19. Marty Holah, 22. Rico Gear

27 November 2004

France	6–45	New Zealand
Pen: Michalak (2)	Report	Try: So'oialo; Collins; Carter; Kelleher; Nonu; Con: Carter (4); Pen: Carter (4)

Stade de France, Saint-Denis
Attendance: 79,000
Referee: Alain Rolland (Ireland)

France: 15. Clément Poitrenaud, 14. Aurélien Rougerie, 13. Tony Marsh, 12. Brian Liebenberg, 11. Cédric Heymans, 10. Julien Peyrelongue, 9. Frédéric Michalak, 8. Imanol Harinordoquy, 7. Olivier Magne, 6. Serge Betsen, 5. Jérôme Thion, 4. Fabien Pelous (capt.), 3. Pieter de Villiers, 2. William Servat, 1. Sylvain Marconnet, – Replacements: 16. Sébastien Bruno, 17. Olivier Milloud, 18. Pascal Papé, 19. Julien Bonnaire, 20. Mathieu Barrau, 21. Yannick Jauzion, 22. Christophe Dominici
New Zealand: 15. Mils Muliaina, 14. Doug Howlett, 13. Conrad Smith, 12. Tana Umaga (capt.), 11. Joe Rokocoko, 10. Dan Carter, 9. Byron Kelleher, 8. Rodney So'oialo, 7. Richie McCaw, 6. Jerry Collins, 5. Norm Maxwell, 4. Chris Jack, 3. Carl Hayman, 2. Anton Oliver, 1. Tony Woodcock, – Replacements: 16. Keven Mealamu, 17. Greg Somerville, 18. Ali Williams, 21. Aaron Mauger, 22. Ma'a Nonu – Unused: 19. Mose Tuiali'i, 20. Piri Weepu

4 December 2004

Barbarians	19–47	New Zealand XV

Twickenham Stadium, London
