= The Lions' Den =

2019 non-fiction book by Susie Linfield

The Lions' Den: Zionism and the Left from Hannah Arendt to Noam Chomsky
- First edition cover
- Author: Susie Linfield
- Audio read by: Kathe Mazur
- Language: English
- Subject: Anti-Zionism
- Publisher: Yale University Press
- Publication date: March 26, 2019
- Publication place: United States
- Media type: Print (hardcover)
- Pages: 400
- ISBN: 978-0-300-22298-2
- Dewey Decimal: 296.3/82
- LC Class: DS149 .L558 2019

The Lions' Den: Zionism and the Left from Hannah Arendt to Noam Chomsky is a 2019 book by associate professor of journalism Susie Linfield, a social and cultural theorist at New York University who self describes as a leftist and a Zionist. Lion's Den traces the roots of leftist criticism of Israel by studying eight influential leftist intellectuals: Hannah Arendt, Arthur Koestler, Maxime Rodinson, Isaac Deutscher, Albert Memmi, Fred Halliday; I. F. Stone and Noam Chomsky.

Linfield writes that "Only in the case of Israel is the eradication of an extant nation... considered a progressive demand".

== Synopsis ==
Anti-Israel leftism, in Linfield's narrative, began in the late 1950s when leftists who had lost faith in the Soviet Union began to equate anticolonialism with socialism, in the phrasing of Albert Memmi who opposed the equation. British political theorist Alan Johnson endorses Linfield's view that the left never recovered from this false equation. To illustrate her point that the left was wrong in its assessment of Arab political attitudes, Linfield cites a 1958 article in the New Reasoner by British Marxist Harry Hanson about Arab nationalism, "Despite its . . . exaggerated xenophobia, its apparent resemblance, in certain of its aspects, to Fascism or Nazism, and—most serious of all its vitriolic hatred of Israel—it is fundamentally and essentially a progressive movement." Linfield argues that the notion that xenophobic, antisemitic Arab nationalism was definitionally progressive because it was anti-imperialist was accepted as doctrine by progressive Western leftists, merging with an idea held by Marx himself that Jewish peoplehood must dissolve into progressive universalism. The innovation of the 1950s was that Israel should be destroyed. The Tunisian Jewish leftist Alfred Memmi who was asked by Tunisian authorities to leave the country when it won independence, described the Left's equation of anti-imperialism with socialism that had become “intrinsic to Left politics," as a spurious universalism and a “betrayal of the Jews.”

For Linfield the ideas driven by Arendt, Koestler, Rodinson, Stone, and Chomsky have had two bad consequensces. The first is the leftist romance with even the most reactionary, fascistic and illiberal forms of anti-imperialism produces a "calamitous obliviousness" to reality, accompanied by a "treacherous readiness to substitute ideology, wishful thinking, or sheer fantasy" for it. As an example of this, Linfield discusses Maxime Rodinson's framing of Zionism as a sin to which Arab Jew-hatred and terrorism, and offensive wars were a justified reaction. Linfield states the second negative consequence of leftist support for reactionary anti-imperialism is that the left has forsaken its own foundational values; where leftists long argued that disputes between competing national claims should be resolved by rational negotiations designed to accommodate aspirations of all peoples through consistent democracy, they now support the denial of the national claims of only one nation: the Jewish nation.

Reviewing the book for The New York Times, J.J. Goldberg, wrote that Noam Chomsky and the British journalist Fred Halliday seemed "quite out of place here" because they were members of a different generation than the books earlier thinkers, while,

“ "The six overlapping profiles, on the other hand, tell such an intriguing story that the book’s marginal oddities fade in importance. Here they are: the German-born political philosopher Hannah Arendt; the mercurial, Hungarian-born novelist and adventurer Arthur Koestler; the great biographer and Trotsky admirer Isaac Deutscher; the combative American journalist I. F. Stone; the French Arabist journalist Maxime Rodinson; and the Tunisian-French anticolonialist philosopher Albert Memmi.

All six lived through, wrote about and were shaped by the cataclysmic events of the mid-20th century: the rise of fascism, the Moscow show trials, World War II and the Holocaust, Israel’s independence and, significantly, the 1967 Six-Day War. All considered themselves socialists, some episodically, most as a lifelong identifier.

All six were Jewish. All wrote urgently and at length about the Jewish history that was unfolding before their eyes. All wrote about the place of the Jew in the modern world, some dismissively, most with sympathy, all beneath the shadow of the Nazi genocide that was engulfing Europe and their own families.

The six were all independent, unconventional thinkers who often found themselves alone and at odds with their own peers and allies. All produced ideas and phrases that have entered our moral vocabulary, most notably Arendt’s 'banality of evil.'"

Fred Halliday, the only non-Jew of the eight intellectuals Linfield focuses on, broke with the leftist consensus and supports Israel's right to exist. An expert on Iranian politics, Halliday has asked why his fellow leftists support the “revanchist demand” that Israel should be eliminated, why Arafat was praised for rejecting a peace deal, and why Hamas is allegedly preferred to the Palestinian Authority.

Albert Memmi regarded leftist criticism of Israel as “so extensive and recurrent” that “they were intrinsic to left politics rather than random aberrations.”

== Reception ==
David Mikics calls Lion's Den "compulsively readable and nearly always persuasive."

Journalist J.J. Goldberg concludes that the thinkers profiled by Linfield, "precisely anticipate the tension today’s Jewish liberals experience trying to reconcile their own pro-Israel particularism and their social-justice universalism. Linfield could not have foreseen, even a year ago as she was writing, the current predicament of Democrats caught between support of Israel and sympathy for the Palestinians, or — dare we say it? — between the affections of America’s well-established Jewish community and fast-rising Muslim community. Unexpectedly, her book appears just as its stories and lessons become urgent.

Journalist Robert Scheer criticized the book, writing that its targets "are all attacked for daring to raise questions" about Israeli policy, especially toward the Palestinians. Noam Chomsky told Scheer the book is an "extraordinary collection of lies and deceit."
