= 2004 in rugby league =

The year 2004 in rugby league football centered on Australasia's 2004 NRL season and Super League IX.

== January ==
- 26th - Sydney, Australia: The Rugby League International Federation announces that the next World Cup will be held in Australia in 2008 to celebrate the centenary of the game in the Southern Hemisphere.

== February ==
- 13th - Huddersfield, England: The 2004 World Club Challenge is won by the Bradford Bulls who defeated the Penrith Panthers 22-4 at Alfred McAlpine Stadium before a crowd of 18,962.
- 24th - Coffs Harbour, Australia: Several players from the Bulldogs NRL club face police investigation after a complaint of sexual assault from a 20-year-old woman. No charges were laid.

== March ==
- 12th - Sydney, Australia: The first round of the NRL's 2004 Telstra Premiership begins with 2003 champions, the Penrith Panthers losing 14-20 to the Newcastle Knights before a crowd of 19,936 at Penrith Stadium.

== April ==
- 25 - Widnes, England: Widnes Vikings hooker Shane Millard completes a match with a fragment of tooth embedded in his head after a head clash in the first half with the Castleford Tigers' Dean Ripley.

== May ==
- 15th - Cardiff, Wales: The 2004 Challenge Cup tournament culminates in St Helens's 32–16 victory against Wigan in the final at Millennium Stadium before a crowd of 73,734.

== June ==
- 17th - Leeds, England: The Rugby Football League bans St Helens R.F.C. players Martin Gleeson (4 months) and Sean Long (3 months) and fines each £7,500 plus £2,205 costs for a betting scandal.

== July ==
- 7th - Sydney, Australia: The 2004 State of Origin series is won by New South Wales who defeated Queensland 36–14 in the third and deciding game of the series at Telstra Stadium before a crowd of 82,487.

== August ==
- 4th - Sydney, Australia: The National Rugby League judiciary hands down an 18-week suspension to Melbourne forward Danny Williams for a king hit on Wests forward Mark O'Neill in Round 19.

== September ==
- 22nd - Sydney, Australia: The 6th annual Tom Brock Lecture, entitled No more bloody bundles for Britain: The Post-World War II tours of the British and French Allies, is delivered by Tom Keneally, AO

== October ==
- 4th - Sydney, Australia: The NRL season culminates in the 2004 NRL Grand final in which the Bulldogs defeat the Sydney Roosters 16-13 at Telstra Stadium before a crowd of 82,127.

== November ==
- 7 - Warrington, England: The 2004 European Nations Cup tournament culminates in England's 36-12 victory over Ireland in the final at Halliwell Jones Stadium before a crowd of 3,582
- 16th - Manchester, England the Super League season culminates in the 2004 Super League Grand final in which the Leeds Rhinos defeat the Bradford Bulls 16-8 at Old Trafford before a crowd of 65,547.
- 22 - Leeds, England: At the 2004 RLIF Awards Great Britain captain Andy Farrell is awarded the Golden Boot Award for the World's best player.
- 27 - Leeds, England: The 2004 Tri-Nations tournament culminates in Australia's victory over Great Britain in the final at Elland Road before a crowd of 39,120.

== December ==
- 23rd - Leeds, England: The Rugby Football League fines Keith Senior and Ryan Bailey £1,500 each after they tested positive to the banned stimulant ephedrine.
