= 2004 ARFU Asian Rugby Championship =

2004 Asian Rugby Championship
Tournament details
- Host: Hong Kong
- Date: 28–31 October 2004
- Countries: 12

Final positions
- Champions: Japan (14th title)

Tournament statistics
- Matches played: 12

The 2004 ARFU Asian Rugby Championship was the 19th edition of the tournament, de facto the last complete edition, due to the problems of the 20th edition, scheduled for 2006, but completed only in 2007.

The tournament was played at Hong Kong, and won by Japan.

The team were divided into three divisions, according to the results of the 2003-2004 ARFU Asian Rugby Series.

== Tournament ==
=== First division ("Cup") ===
- Semifinals

28 October 2004

South Korea	63–7	Chinese Taipei

Hong Kong

28 October 2004

Japan XV	40–12	Hong Kong

Hong Kong

- Third Place Final

31 October 2004

Hong Kong	63–7	Chinese Taipei

Hong Kong

- First Place final

31 October 2004

Japan XV	29–0	South Korea

Hong Kong

=== Second division ("Plate") ===
- Semifinals

28 October 2004

Thailand	37–36	Kazakhstan

Hong Kong

28 October 2004

Arabian Gulf	6–32	Singapore

Hong Kong

- Third Place Final

31 October 2004

Arabian Gulf	9–19	Kazakhstan

Hong Kong

- First Place final

31 October 2004

Singapore	41–34	Thailand

Hong Kong

=== Third division ("Bowl") ===
Note: Pakistan replaced Malaysia.

- Semifinals

28 October 2004

Sri Lanka	75–3	Pakistan

Hong Kong

28 October 2004

China	50–15	India

Hong Kong

- Third Place Final

31 October 2004

Pakistan	3–56	India

Hong Kong

- First Place final

31 October 2004

China	30–16	Sri Lanka

Hong Kong
