= 2004 Africa Cup =

5th Africa Cup
- Date: 7 March 2004– 13 November 2004
- Countries: Cameroon; Ivory Coast; Kenya; Madagascar; Morocco; Namibia; Tunisia; Uganda; Zambia; Zimbabwe

Final positions
- Champions: Namibia
- Runner-up: Morocco

Tournament statistics
- Matches played: 14

The 2004 Africa Cup (officially called "Africa Top ten" at the time) was the fifth edition of top level rugby union tournament in Africa. Ten teams were admitted, but Tunisia withdrew.

The final was played in 2004, due to the participation of Namibia to the 2003 Rugby World Cup tournament.

The teams were divided into two zones, North and South. The North Zone contained four teams in a round robin pool. In South Zone, the six teams were divided in two pools, with a "Zone final" between the winner of each pool.

At the end a second division was also played as "CAR Development".

== Division 1 (Africa Cup) ==
=== North Zone ===
Place	Nation	Games				Points			Table points
Place	Nation	played	won	drawn	lost	for	against	difference	Table points
1	Morocco	3	3	0	0	46	15	+31	6
2	Ivory Coast	3	2	0	1	31	24	+7	4
3	Tunisia	3	1	0	2	26	28	-2	2
4	Cameroon	3	0	0	3	19	55	-36	0

7 March 2004

Ivory Coast	8 – 3	Tunisia

Abidjan

27 March 2004

Morocco	11 – 6	Ivory Coast

Casablanca

10 April 2004

Tunisia	20 – 3	Cameroon

Tunis

24 April 2004

Morocco	17 – 3	Tunisia

Casablanca

1 May 2004

Ivory Coast	17 – 10	Cameroon

Abidjan

29 May 2004

Cameroon	6 – 18	Morocco

Yaoundé

=== South Zone ===
==== Pool 1 ====
Place	Nation	Games				Points			Table points
Place	Nation	played	won	drawn	lost	for	against	difference	Table points
1	Zimbabwe	2	1	0	1	35	23	+12	2
2	Madagascar	2	1	0	1	39	42	-3	2
3	Uganda	2	1	0	1	24	33	-9	2

14 August 2004

Uganda	24 – 16	Madagascar

Kampala

29 August 2004

Madagascar	23 – 18	Zimbabwe

Antananarivo

11 September 2004

Zimbabwe	17 – 0	Uganda

Harare

==== Pool 2 ====
Place	Nation	Games				Points			Table points
Place	Nation	played	won	drawn	lost	for	against	difference	Table points
1	Namibia	2	2	0	0	117	17	+100	4
2	Kenya	2	1	0	1	40	75	-35	2
3	Zambia	2	0	0	2	20	85	-65	0

14 August 2004

Zambia	10 – 52	Namibia

Nchingola

29 August 2004

Kenya	33 – 10	Zambia

Nairobi

11 September 2004

Namibia	65 – 7	Kenya

Windhoek

==== South Zone Final ====
25 September 2004

Namibia	68 – 8	Zimbabwe

Windhoek

=== Final ===
13 November 2004

Namibia	39 – 22	Morocco

Windhoek
