= Ion Ionescu de la Brad =

Romanian agronomist

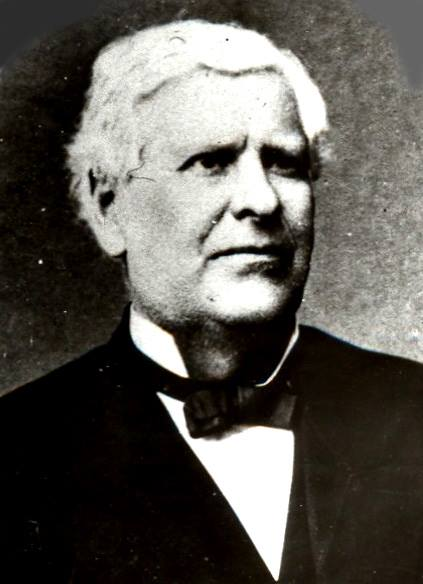

Ion Ionescu de la Brad (June 24, 1818 – December 16, 1891), born Ion Isăcescu, was a Moldavian, later Romanian revolutionary, agronomist, statistician, scholar, and writer.

Born in Roman, he was the son of a Moldavian Orthodox priest. Ionescu was educated in Iași, at the Trei Ierarhi school, and then at the Academia Mihăileană, where he studied with Eftimie Murgu. He pursued his studies at the University of Paris, where he specialized in agrarian economics. In 1842, he became a professor of agronomy at the Academia Mihăileană in Iași, collaborated with the nationalists associated with the journal Propășirea (1844), and, with Nicolae Bălcescu, became a principal advocate of land reform in the Danubian Principalities.

Following the idea of the British diplomat David Urquhart, in 1844 Ionescu developed and supported the proposal for the building of an artificial waterway across the Ottoman province of Dobruja, located between the Danube and the Black Sea (Port of Constanța). His proposal aimed to support the transportation of the increasing cereal production of the Danubian Principalities toward the seaport of Kustendje (today Constanța in Romania) for the mutual profit of the Romanian grain producers and Ottoman (mainly Ottoman Greeks and Ottoman Armenians) and foreign merchants. The Danube–Black Sea Canal and its additional waterworks where completed only in 1987.

Following the failure of the short-lived Moldavian movement in 1848, Ionescu joined Bălcescu in Bucharest as a participant in the unsuccessful revolution in Wallachia. He served as leader of the radical faction in the commission established to handle land reform. After the defeat of the Wallachian revolution in September, 1848, Ionescu went into exile in the Ottoman Empire. Returning to Moldavia in 1857, he was extremely active as an administrator, deputy, and professor after the unification of Moldavia and Wallachia (in 1859–1861) in agrarian reform, agricultural education, and economic and statistical research. Ionescu de la Brad was a prolific scholar and writer on agricultural and economic topics, publishing over 40 books and pamphlets and nearly 400 articles.

In 1884 he was elected honorary member of the Romanian Academy. He died in 1891 in Brad, Bacău County; a memorial house is now located in that village.

== See also ==
- Ion Ionescu de la Brad University of Agricultural Sciences and Veterinary Medicine of Iași
