= Gheorghe Asachi Technical University of Iași =

Public university in Iași, Romania

- Universitatea Tehnică „Gheorghe Asachi” din Iași
- Former names: Gheorghe Asachi Polytechnic School (1937–1948); Gheorghe Asachi Polytechnic Institute (1948–1993)
- Motto: Ipsa scientia potestas est (Latin)
- Motto in English: Knowledge itself is power
- Type: Public
- Established: March 1937; 89 years ago 1910 - School of Industrial Electricity; 1813 - School of Surveying and Civil Engineers
- Rector: Dan Cașcaval
- Faculty: 1,100
- Students: 16,382 (2012–2013)
- Undergraduates: 11,939
- Postgraduates: 4,443
- Location: Iași, Iași County, Western Moldavia, Romania
- Campus: Urban
- Website: www.tuiasi.ro

University rankings

Global – Overall
- QS World: 1201–1400 (2024)
- THE World: 1501+ (2024)
- USNWR Global: =1786 (2023)

The Gheorghe Asachi Technical University of Iași (Romanian: Universitatea Tehnică „Gheorghe Asachi” din Iași; acronym: TUIASI) is a public university located in Iași, Iași County, Western Moldavia, Romania. Classified by the Ministry of Education as an advanced research and education university, it has the oldest tradition in Romania in engineering education. Gheorghe Asachi Technical University is a member of the Romanian Alliance of Technical Universities (ARUT).

== History ==
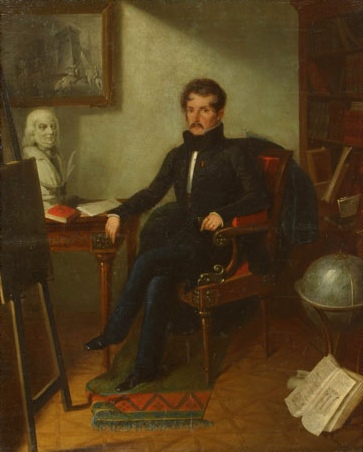
Portrait of Gheorghe Asachi

In 1813, the scholar Gheorghe Asachi set up within the Princely Academy of Iași, the first Romanian language higher education courses, as the School of Surveying and Civil Engineers (Școala de Ingineri Hotarnici și Civili), beginning with a civil engineering class which was later developed within the Academia Mihăileană (1835), and the University of Iași (1860).

In November 1910, within the Faculty of Sciences of the University of Iași, an independent section, named School of Industrial Electricity, was set up. Soon renamed as the Institute of Electrical Engineering, the school was the first of its kind in Romania.

On 7 November 1912, within the Faculty of Sciences, the electrotechnical, applied chemistry and agronomy departments are established. This event represents what may be called the birth certificate of what later became the Polytechnic School of Iași.

In March 1937, when the Parliament of Romania voted a new Law of Education, the technical higher education departments of the University of Iași were reorganised as faculties and integrated into the newly established Gheorghe Asachi Polytechnic School, which was, at that time, one of the few higher education institutions in Romania qualified to issue engineer's degrees. The new institution took from the very beginning the name of Gheorghe Asachi, the founder of the Romanian technical education, while professor Cristea Niculescu-Otin was elected its first rector.

In 1948, it was renamed as the Gheorghe Asachi Polytechnic Institute, and the Faculty of Agronomy became independent as the Agronomic Institute of Iași. On 17 May 1993, the Polytechnic Institute of Iași became known as the Gheorghe Asachi Technical University.

== Ranking ==
Gheorghe Asachi Technical University has ranked the first among the technical institutions of higher education, and the fourth among all universities in Romania, in the national research ranking compiled on the basis of Shanghai criteria.

According to the Scimago Lab, based on data collected between 2007 and 2011, Gheorghe Asachi Technical University ranked 1258 in the World, 70 regionally and 7 in the country by number of publications.

== Academics ==
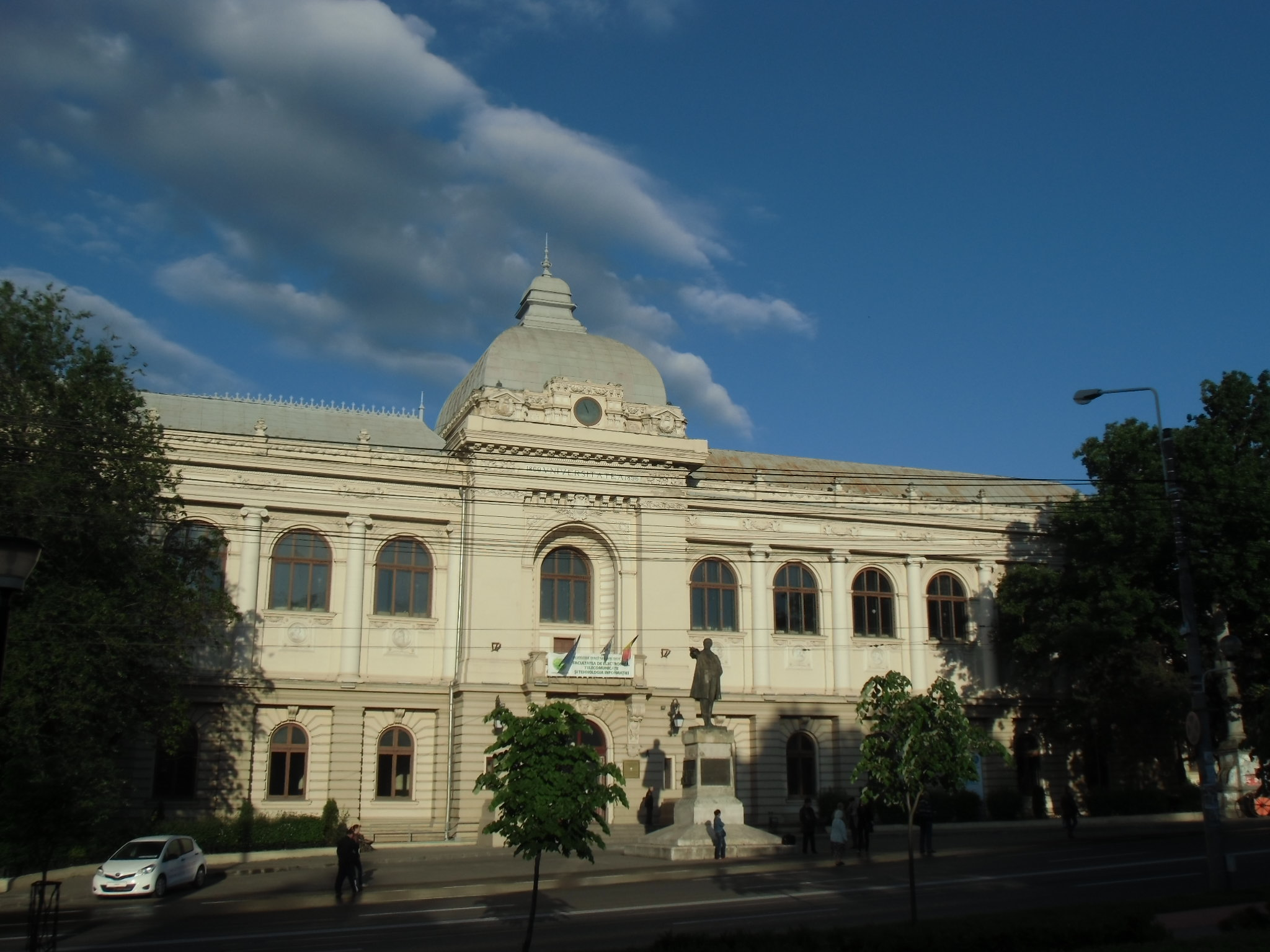
The old wing (1893-1897) of the University Palace houses Technical University Central Library and Aula Magna "Carmen Sylva", as well as the Faculty of Electronics

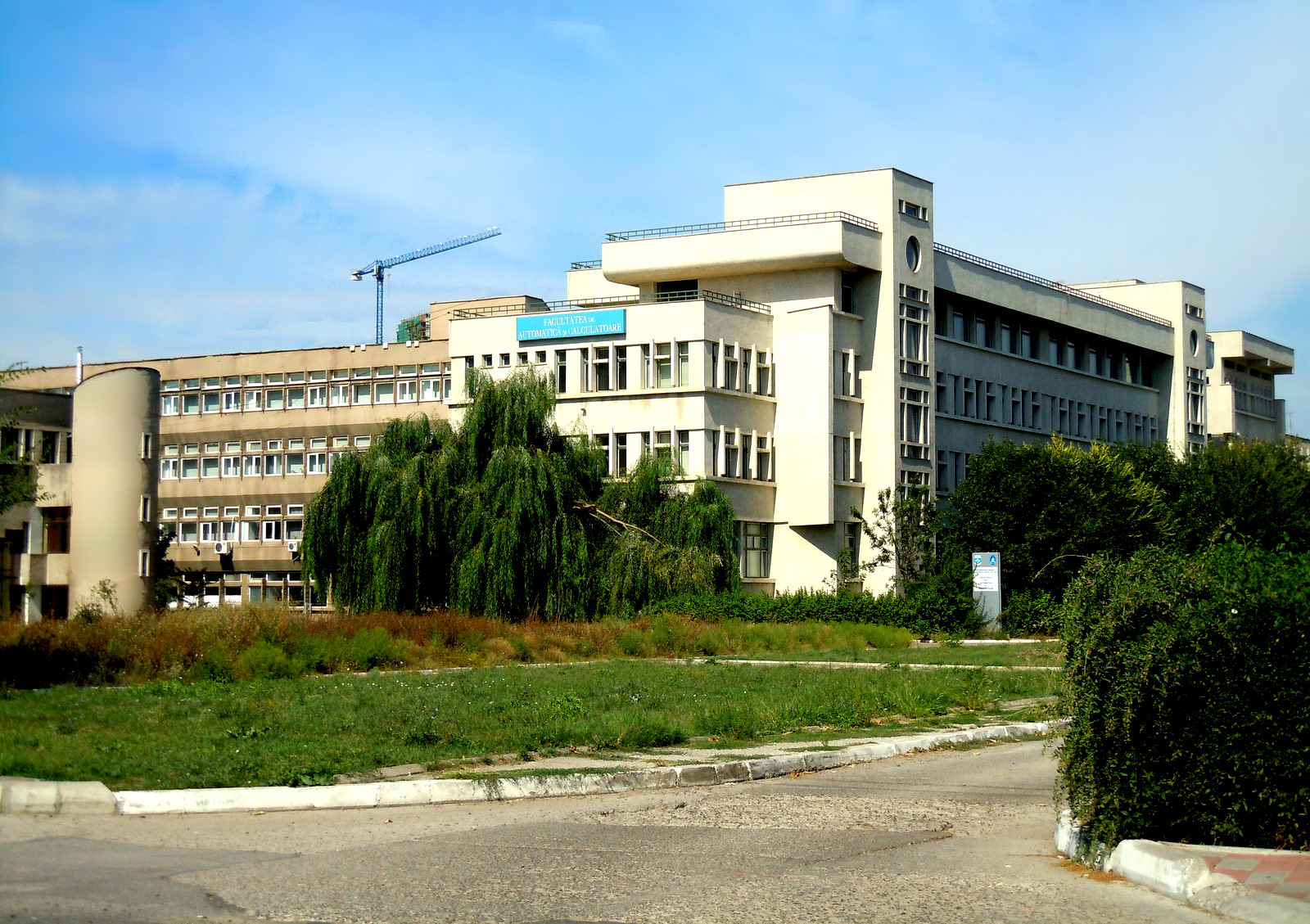
Faculty of Automatic Control and Computer Engineering

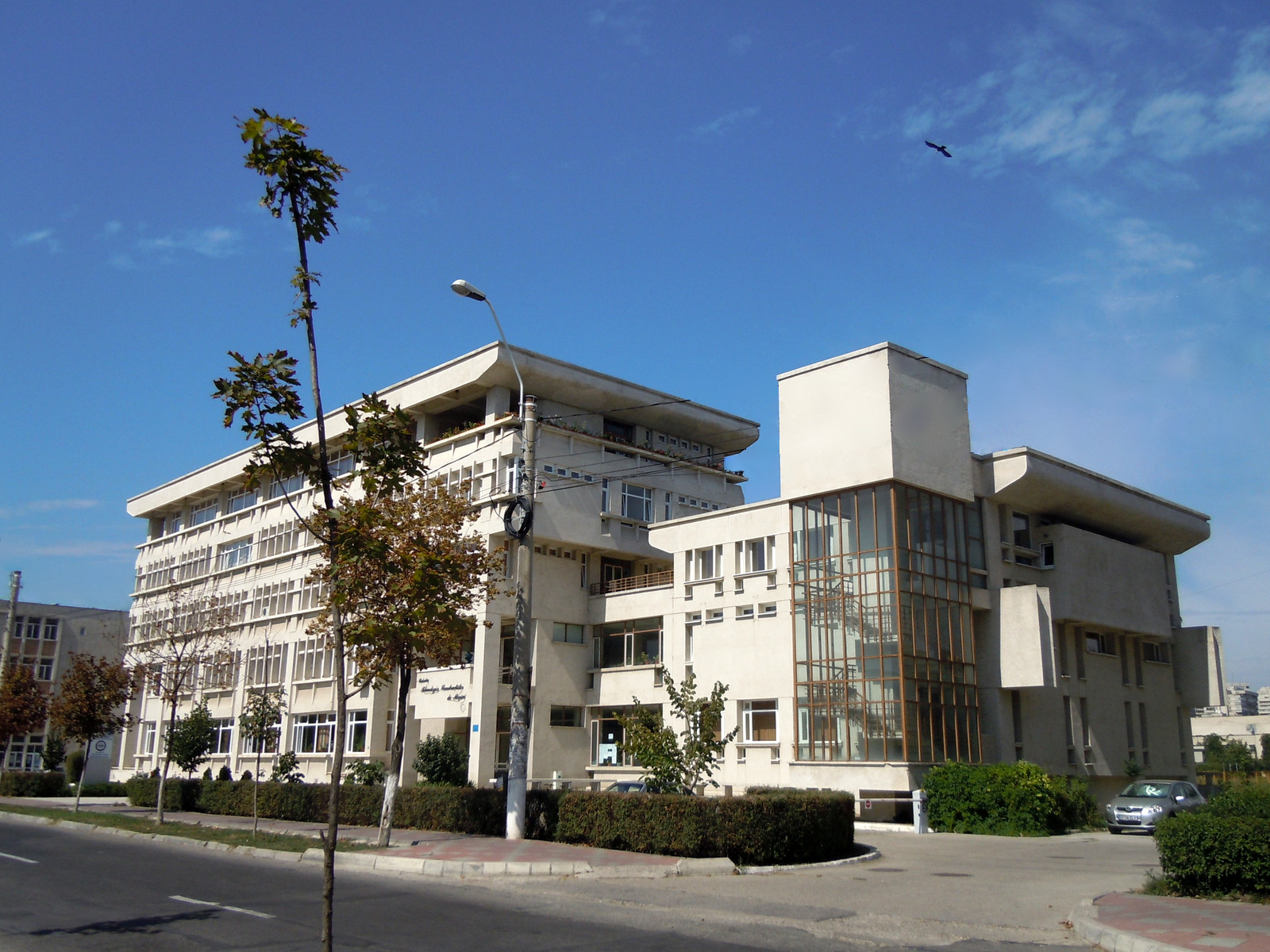
Faculty of Machine Manufacturing

Gheorghe Asachi Technical University is organized into 11 faculties and 3 departments:

- The "G.M. Cantacuzino" Faculty of Architecture was founded in 1970 as a department of the Faculty of Civil Engineering, and organized as faculty in 2003.
- The Faculty of Automatic Control and Computer Engineering was founded in 1977 as a department of the Faculty of Electrical Engineering, and organized as faculty in 1990. It offers programs in Computer Science and Information Technology, and Systems Engineering.
- The "Cristofor Simonescu" Faculty of Chemical Engineering and Environmental Protection was founded in 1912 as an independent section of the Faculty of Sciences of the University of Iași. In 1937, it became a faculty of the new Gheorghe Asachi Polytechnic School. It offers programs in Chemical and Environmental Engineering and Management.
- The Faculty of Civil Engineering and Building Services (founded in 1941).
- The Faculty of Electrical Engineering, Energetics and Applied Informatics, founded in 1910 as a department of the Faculty of Sciences (part of the University of Iași). In 1937, it was organized as a faculty of the Gheorghe Asachi Polytechnic School.
- The Faculty of Electronics, Telecommunications and Information Technology was founded in 1975 as a department of the Faculty of Electrical Engineering, and organized as faculty in 1990. It offers programs in Applied Electronics, Telecommunications Technologies and Systems, and Microelectronics, Optoelectronics and Nanotechnologies.
- The Faculty of Hydrotechnical Engineering, Geodesy and Environmental Engineering was founded in 1962. It offers programs in Civil and Environmental Engineering, and Geodesy.
- The Faculty of Industrial Design and Business Management, formerly known as the Faculty of Textiles, Leather and Industrial Management, is the oldest textile technologies and design institution of higher education in Romania. Founded in Bucharest in 1934, under the name Superior School of Light Industry, then Institute of Light Industry, it was transferred to Iași in 1952, and integrated into the Gheorghe Asachi Polytechnic Institute, in 1955, as the Faculty of Light Industry. It offers programs in Industrial Engineering (Industrial design, Textile technology and design, Knitted and ready-made clothing technology, Technology and design for leather garments and substitutes), Chemical Engineering (Textile chemical technology, Chemical technology for leather products and substitutes), and Management and Economic Engineering (Industrial engineering, Engineering and Business Management).
- The Faculty of Machine Manufacturing and Industrial Management was founded in 1948 as a department of the Faculty of Mechanical Engineering, and organized as faculty in 1990. It offers programs in Industrial Engineering, Mechanical Engineering, and Engineering and Management.
- The Faculty of Material Science and Engineering was founded in 1977 as a department of the Faculty of Mechanical Engineering, and organized as faculty in 1990. It offers programs in Materials, Mechanical and Industrial Engineering.
- The Faculty of Mechanical Engineering founded in 1948, it offers programs in Automotive and Mechanical Engineering, Mechatronics and Robotics.
- Centre for Research and Technology Transfer Polytech.
- Counselling Centre for Pro and Postgraduate Guidance.
- Department of Teacher Education and Training.

=== Library ===
Established as a reference and research technical library, the “Gh. Asachi” Technical University Library holds 1 million-plus volumes covering a wide range of subjects on engineering and technology, science, economics and law. It is organised in a Central Library, 6 branches and 8 departments.

== Programmes ==
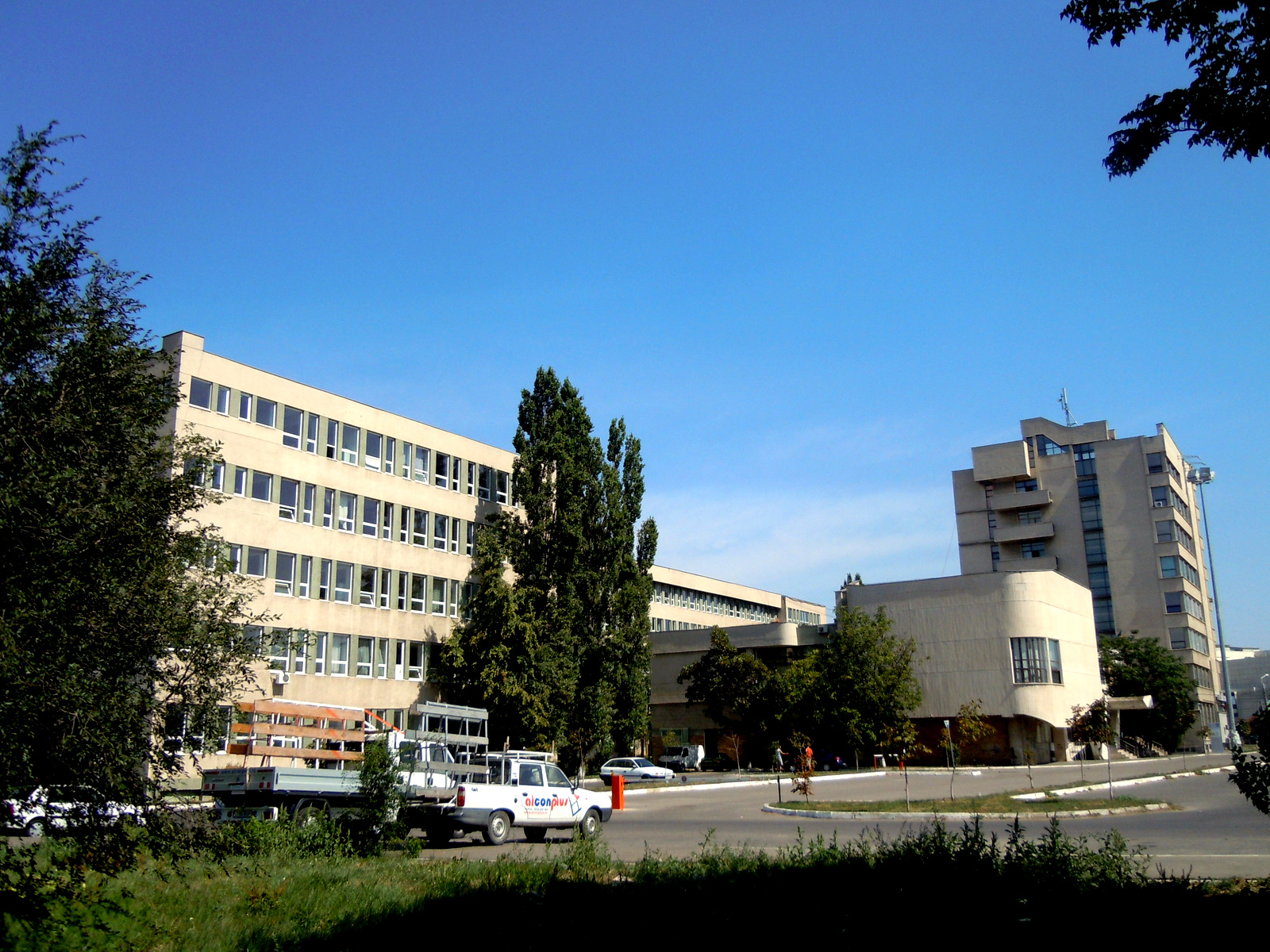
Faculty of Chemical Engineering

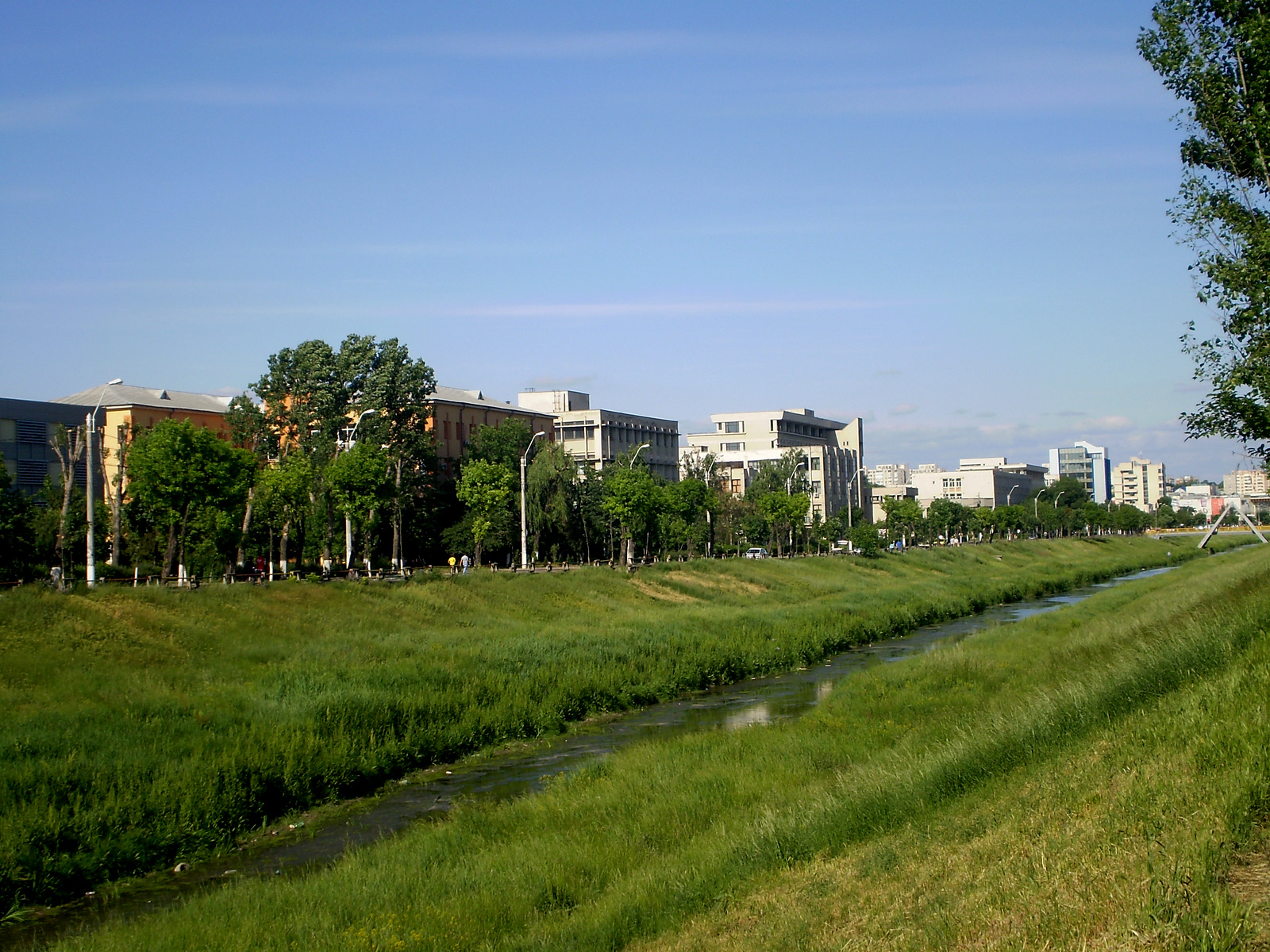
Central portion of the university grounds seen from the Bahlui River

Gheorghe Asachi Technical University offers 4-year programmes, awarding the degree of Bachelor of Science ("Engineer"), and graduate/postgraduate programmes awarding the degrees of Master and Doctorate/PhD. The degree of "Architect" is awarded at the end of a 6-year programme as a combined Bachelor/Master's degree programme. There is also a postgraduate school of Management and Business Administration.

The academic year consists of two 14 weeks semesters, each of them ending with an examination session. The weekly workload is about 28 hours. There is also a 3-week period of industrial placement during summer, while half of the final semester (the eighth) in the last year of study, is devoted to completing the diploma thesis and dissertation.

The first two years of the 4-year programmes are devoted to providing an introduction to engineering as well as the necessary background in Physics and Mathematics. Beginning with the third year, students can choose from a number of specializations.

Students who obtain a score of at least 8 out of 10 in the "licence exam" at the end of their "Engineer" degree courses are eligible to take an entrance examination for 1.5 to 2-year Master's course, the length of studies depending on the chosen specialization. All graduates awarded a master's degree, are eligible to enrol on a PhD Programme - full-time (3-year) courses.

== Administration ==
The university is administered by the University Senate, which is made up of representatives from the eleven Faculty Councils. The Senate elects the rector, the vice-rectors and the chancellor every four year.

== Student life ==
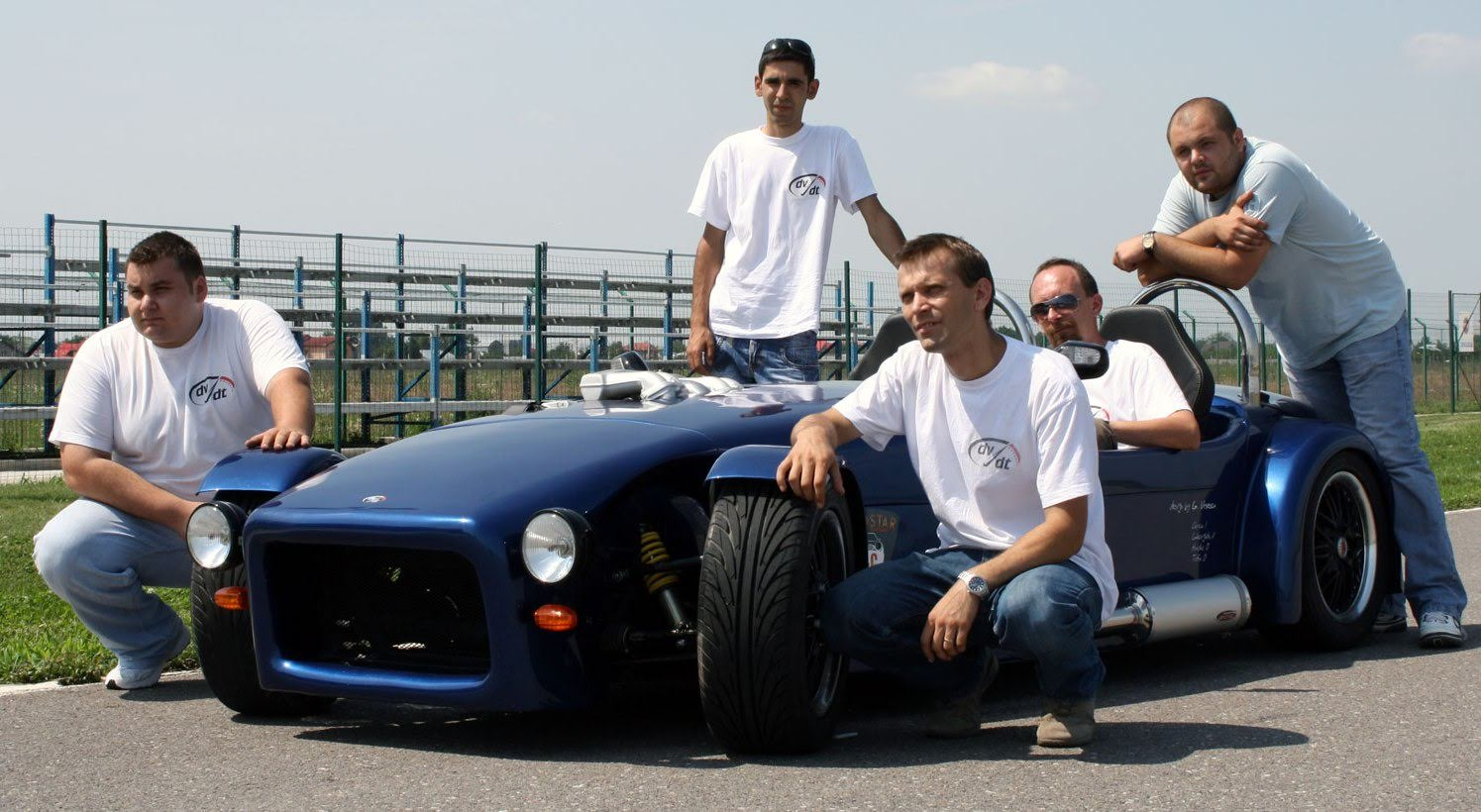
Roadster built by engineering students at TU Iași

=== Student housing ===
The University Campus accommodates 8,100 students, in 21 residence halls, in the Tudor Vladimirescu Campus area, which is near the university grounds and is situated at 5 minutes by car from the center of the city. The buildings in the campus have a number from 1 to 21 and are prefixed with letter T. The T17 students residence hall was, as of 1987, the biggest student residence hall in all of Southeastern Europe.

The neighborhood of the campus is dominated mainly by retail and commercial centres and the Bahlui River.

== See also ==
- List of modern universities in Europe (1801–1945)
