= Ion Ionescu de la Brad University of Life Sciences of Iași =

University in Iași, Romania

Coordinates: 47°11′37″N 27°33′27″E

- Universitatea de Știinţele Vieții „Ion Ionescu de la Brad” din Iași
- Former names: Agronomic Institute of Iași (1948–1990); Ion Ionescu de la Brad University of Agricultural Sciences and Veterinary Medicine (1990–2021)
- Type: Public
- Established: 1912; 114 years ago
- Affiliations: EUA; AUF; IAESTE
- Rector: Gerard Jităreanu
- Academic staff: 200
- Students: 4,338
- Location: Iași, Romania
- Website: iuls.ro

The Ion Ionescu de la Brad University of Life Sciences of Iași (IULS) (Romanian: Universitatea de Științele Vieții „Ion Ionescu de la Brad” din Iași; acronym: USV Iași) is a public university in Iași, Romania. It was named in honor of the scientist Ion Ionescu de la Brad.

== History ==
Between 1842 and 1848, Ion Ionescu de la Brad set up the first classes for agricultural education in Romania, within the Academia Mihăileană.

In 1912, an independent section of the Faculty of Sciences of the University of Iași - Agricultural Sciences Department - was set up, event that represents the birth certificate of the Iași agricultural university education.

In 1933, the department was reorganized as the Faculty of Agricultural Sciences of the University of Iași, and based in Chișinău. In 1937, the faculty became administratively part of the newly established Gheorghe Asachi Polytechnic School, keeping its location in Chișinău. Following the occupation of Bessarabia by the Soviet Union, the faculty from Chișinău became independent as the Chișinău Agricultural Institute (nowadays State Agrarian University of Moldova), while in Iași the Faculty of Agronomy was re-established within the Polytechnic School.

In 1948, the faculty became independent and organized as the Agronomic Institute of Iași. In 1951, the Faculties of Horticulture and Animal Sciences were established, followed by the Faculty of Veterinary Medicine, in 1961.

In 1990, the Agronomic Institute was renamed as the Ion Ionescu de la Brad University of Agricultural Sciences and Veterinary Medicine. In 2021, it became Iași University of Life Sciences.

== Faculties ==
Iași University of Life Sciences has four faculties:

- Faculty of Agriculture (4-year bachelor's degree programme, 2-year master's degree programme, 3-year Doctoral Degree programme).
- Faculty of Horticulture (4-year bachelor's degree programme, 2-year master's degree programme, 3-year Doctoral Degree programme).
- Faculty of Animal Sciences (4-year bachelor's degree programme, 2-year master's degree programme, 3-year Doctoral Degree programme).
- Faculty of Veterinary Medicine (6-year Combined Bachelor-Master's degree programme, 3-year Doctoral Degree programme).
