= List of Hong Kong national rugby union players =

List of Hong Kong national rugby union players is a list of people who have played for the Hong Kong national rugby union team. The list only includes players who have played in a Test match.

Note that the "position" column lists the position at which the player made his Test debut, not necessarily the position for which he is best known. A position in parentheses indicates that the player debuted as a substitute.

Hong Kong's International Rugby Capped Players
Number	Name	Position	Date first cap obtained	Opposition
1	Neil Alton	lock	1994-10-23	v Korea at Kuala Lumpur
2	Ashley Billington	wing	1994-10-23	v Korea at Kuala Lumpur
3	Jon Dingley	no. 8	1994-10-23	v Korea at Kuala Lumpur
4	Andy Fields	hooker	1994-10-23	v Korea at Kuala Lumpur
5	Vaughan Going	fly-half	1994-10-23	v Korea at Kuala Lumpur
6	Aled Jones	prop	1994-10-23	v Korea at Kuala Lumpur
7	Steve Kidd	scrum-half	1994-10-23	v Korea at Kuala Lumpur
8	Stuart Krohn	flanker	1994-10-23	v Korea at Kuala Lumpur
9	Dave Lewis	prop	1994-10-23	v Korea at Kuala Lumpur
10	Rodney McIntosh	centre	1994-10-23	v Korea at Kuala Lumpur
11	Neil Munn	fullback	1994-10-23	v Korea at Kuala Lumpur
12	C. Pain	centre	1994-10-23	v Korea at Kuala Lumpur
13	Roger Patterson	lock	1994-10-23	v Korea at Kuala Lumpur
14	Rick Shuttleworth	flanker	1994-10-23	v Korea at Kuala Lumpur
15	Isi Tu'ivai	wing	1994-10-23	v Korea at Kuala Lumpur
16	Robin Bredbury	fly-half	1994-10-25	v Thailand at Kuala Lumpur
17	Jo Hancock	wing	1994-10-25	v Thailand at Kuala Lumpur
18	G. Jamieson	lock	1994-10-25	v Thailand at Kuala Lumpur
19	Chris North	prop	1994-10-25	v Thailand at Kuala Lumpur
20	J. Piper	wing	1994-10-25	v Thailand at Kuala Lumpur
21	Toby Bland	(replacement)	1994-10-25	v Thailand at Kuala Lumpur
22	J. McKee	(replacement)	1994-10-25	v Thailand at Kuala Lumpur
23	K. Gauntlett	centre	1994-10-27	v Singapore at Kuala Lumpur
24	W. James	hooker	1994-10-27	v Singapore at Kuala Lumpur
25	Will Wild	no. 8	1994-10-27	v Singapore at Kuala Lumpur
26	Alan Clark	hooker	1996-05-11	v Japan at Tokyo
27	Duane Davis	flanker	1996-05-11	v Japan at Tokyo
28	Rob Grindlay	prop	1996-05-11	v Japan at Tokyo
29	Richard Muik	fullback	1996-05-11	v Japan at Tokyo
30	Rob Santos	centre	1996-05-11	v Japan at Tokyo
31	Mark Solomon	wing	1996-05-11	v Japan at Tokyo
32	Warren Warner	(replacement)	1996-05-18	v Japan at Hong Kong
33	Murray Wilson	(replacement)	1996-06-01	v Canada at Hong Kong
34	Brent Edwards	flanker	1996-06-08	v United States of America at Hong Kong
35	Michael Rarere	(replacement)	1996-07-06	v Canada at Vancouver
36	Leighton Duley	prop	1996-10-05	v Fiji at Hong Kong
37	Chris Jones	fullback	1996-10-05	v Fiji at Hong Kong
38	Brett Shuttleworth	flanker	1996-10-05	v Fiji at Hong Kong
39	Nigel d'Acre	fly-half	1997-05-03	v Japan at Hong Kong
40	Paul Dingley	flanker	1997-05-03	v Japan at Hong Kong
41	Riaz Fredricks	centre	1997-05-03	v Japan at Hong Kong
42	Chris Gordon	wing	1997-05-03	v Japan at Hong Kong
43	Dean Herewini	prop	1997-05-03	v Japan at Hong Kong
44	Wiremu Maunsell	centre	1997-05-03	v Japan at Hong Kong
45	Luke Nabaro	wing	1997-05-03	v Japan at Hong Kong
46	Niall McCarthy	(replacement)	1997-05-03	v Japan at Hong Kong
47	Carl Murray	(replacement)	1997-05-03	v Japan at Hong Kong
48	Steve Pengelly	lock	1997-06-14	v United States of America at San Francisco
49	Gary Cross	(replacement)	1997-06-14	v United States of America at San Francisco
50	Scott Cartwright	(replacement)	1997-06-29	v Japan at Tokyo
51	Ben Perrin	(replacement)	1997-06-29	v Japan at Tokyo
52	Andrew Barr	lock	1998-05-09	v Canada at Hong Kong
53	John Gordon	flanker	1998-05-09	v Canada at Hong Kong
54	Adam Kelly	prop	1998-05-09	v Canada at Hong Kong
55	Roger Leeson	centre	1998-05-09	v Canada at Hong Kong
56	Chris Yates	fly-half	1998-05-09	v Canada at Hong Kong
57	Ian Cooke	(replacement)	1998-05-09	v Canada at Hong Kong
58	Sean O'Hara	(replacement)	1998-05-16	v United States of America at Hong Kong
59	Robbie McDonald	(replacement)	1998-06-13	v Canada at Shawnigan Lake
60	Luciano Afeaki	(replacement)	1998-06-20	v United States of America at San Francisco
61	Hamish Bowden	flanker/no.8	1996-11-03	v Malaysia at Taipei (ARFT)
62	Fuk Ping Chan	fullback	1998-10-24	v Chinese Taipei at Singapore
63	J. Clark	centre	1998-10-24	v Chinese Taipei at Singapore
64	J. Hillhind	no. 8	1998-10-24	v Chinese Taipei at Singapore
65	Wes Packer	flanker	1998-10-24	v Chinese Taipei at Singapore
66	C. Scragg	lock	1998-10-24	v Chinese Taipei at Singapore
67	Stephen Thompson	flanker	1998-10-24	v Chinese Taipei at Singapore
68	Joel Dunn	(replacement)	1998-10-31	v Japan at Singapore
69	T.A. Hall	(replacement)	1998-10-31	v Japan at Singapore
70	Rambo Leung	(replacement)	1998-10-31	v Japan at Singapore
71	Dave Wigley	(replacement)	1998-10-31	v Japan at Singapore

== Players Capped Since Establishment of Hong Kong SAR [1st July 1997] ==
Cap Number	Full Name	Debut Opposition	Debut Date	Debut Result	Caps
1	Chris North	Canada	09-May-98	Won: 23-17	3
2	Dave Lewis	Canada	09-May-98	Won: 23-17	8
3	Adam Kelly	Canada	09-May-98	Won: 23-17	6
4	Andrew Barr	Canada	09-May-98	Won: 23-17	6
5	Steve Pengelly	Canada	09-May-98	Won: 23-17	6
6	Jon Dingley	Canada	09-May-98	Won: 23-17	9
7	John Gordon	Canada	09-May-98	Won: 23-17	6
8	Paul Dingley	Canada	09-May-98	Won: 23-17	22
9	Steve Kidd	Canada	09-May-98	Won: 23-17	11
10	Chris Yates	Canada	09-May-98	Won: 23-17	6
11	Luke Nabaro	Canada	09-May-98	Won: 23-17	6
12	Nigel D'Acre	Canada	09-May-98	Won: 23-17	10
13	Roger Leeson	Canada	09-May-98	Won: 23-17	6
14	Chris Gordon	Canada	09-May-98	Won: 23-17	16
15	Vaughan Going	Canada	09-May-98	Won: 23-17	6
16	Roger Patterson	Canada	09-May-98	Won: 23-17	13
17	Ian Cooke	Canada	09-May-98	Won: 23-17	6
18	Dean Herewini	Canada	09-May-98	Won: 23-17	4
19	Brent Edwards	Canada	09-May-98	Won: 23-17	13
20	Leighton Duley	USA	16-May-98	Won: 43-25	6
21	Sean O'Hara	USA	16-May-98	Won: 43-25	3
22	Carl Murray	USA	16-May-98	Won: 43-25	10
23	Rodney McIntosh	Canada	13-Jun-98	Lost: 38-12	9
24	Rob McDonald	Canada	13-Jun-98	Lost: 38-12	1
25	Alan Clark	USA	20-Jun-98	Won: 27-17	2
26	Luciano Afeaki	USA	20-Jun-98	Won: 27-17	8
27	Rick Shuttleworth	USA	20-Jun-98	Won: 27-17	8
28	Rob Grindlay	Chinese-Taipei	24-Oct-98	Lost: 30-12	7
29	Hamish Bowden	Chinese-Taipei	24-Oct-98	Lost: 30-12	8
30	Charles Scragg	Chinese-Taipei	24-Oct-98	Lost: 30-12	1
31	Wes Packer	Chinese-Taipei	24-Oct-98	Lost: 30-12	4
32	Stephen Thompson	Chinese-Taipei	24-Oct-98	Lost: 30-12	3
33	J Hillhind	Chinese-Taipei	24-Oct-98	Lost: 30-12	1
34	Robin Bredbury	Chinese-Taipei	24-Oct-98	Lost: 30-12	11
35	Ashley Billington	Chinese-Taipei	24-Oct-98	Lost: 30-12	2
36	Jon Clark	Chinese-Taipei	24-Oct-98	Lost: 30-12	8
37	Mark Solomon	Chinese-Taipei	24-Oct-98	Lost: 30-12	13
38	Chan Fuk-ping	Chinese-Taipei	24-Oct-98	Lost: 30-12	31
39	Toby Bland	South Korea	27-Oct-98	Lost: 20-11	2
40	Will Wild	South Korea	27-Oct-98	Lost: 20-11	5
41	Warren Warner	South Korea	27-Oct-98	Lost: 20-11	11
42	Isi Tu'ivai	South Korea	27-Oct-98	Lost: 20-11	2
43	David Wigley	Japan	31-Oct-98	Lost: 47-7	11
44	Joel Dunn	Japan	31-Oct-98	Lost: 47-7	1
45	Tom Hall	Japan	31-Oct-98	Lost: 47-7	9
46	Rambo Leung	Japan	31-Oct-98	Lost: 47-7	10
47	Matthew Deayton	Singapore	15-May-99	Won: 12-10	9
48	James Burbidge-King	Singapore	15-May-99	Won: 12-10	3
49	Geoff Hurrell	Singapore	15-May-99	Won: 12-10	2
50	Jason Going	Singapore	15-May-99	Won: 12-10	35
51	Lam Kwong Shun	Singapore	15-May-99	Won: 12-10	1
52	Ross Duncan	Singapore	15-May-99	Won: 12-10	4
53	Kelvin Yip Kwok Ho	Singapore	15-May-99	Won: 12-10	15
54	Rob Naylor	Singapore	15-May-99	Won: 12-10	35
55	Peter Choy	Singapore	15-May-99	Won: 12-10	7
56	Gary W.K. Yeung	Singapore	15-May-99	Won: 12-10	2
57	Sam Kynaston	Singapore	15-May-99	Won: 12-10	3
58	Glen Tracey	Singapore	15-May-99	Won: 12-10	7
59	Allan Warner	Singapore	15-May-99	Won: 12-10	6
60	Bryce Dailly	Singapore	15-May-99	Won: 12-10	9
61	Jung Ho Jung	Chinese-Taipei	08-Jun-99	Won: 55-10	1
62	Lee Cheuk-yin	Chinese-Taipei	08-Jun-99	Won: 55-10	18
63	Troy Sing	Chinese-Taipei	08-Jun-99	Won: 55-10	1
64	Mark Avery	Chinese-Taipei	08-Jun-99	Won: 55-10	3
65	Paul Chung Pui Wah	Chinese-Taipei	08-Jun-99	Won: 55-10	6
66	Chris Brooke	Singapore	06-May-00	Won: 30-6	6
67	Rory Dickson	Singapore	06-May-00	Won: 30-6	12
68	Owain Morrison	Singapore	06-May-00	Won: 30-6	9
69	Duncan Robertson	Singapore	06-May-00	Won: 30-6	13
70	Simon Tasker	Singapore	06-May-00	Won: 30-6	3
71	Mark Loynd	Chinese-Taipei	13-May-00	Won: 38-22	9
72	Kenneth Au	China	10-Jun-00	Lost: 17-15	1
73	Justin Gregory	China	10-Jun-00	Lost: 17-15	20
74	Ken Carnduff	China	10-Jun-00	Lost: 17-15	3
75	Tony Wong	China	10-Jun-00	Lost: 17-15	4
76	Matt Reede	Japan	25-Jun-00	Lost: 75-0	3
77	Andrew Dailly	Singapore	05-May-01	Won: 26-8	2
78	Jack Wilson	Singapore	05-May-01	Won: 26-8	8
79	Dean McLachlan	Singapore	05-May-01	Won: 26-8	2
80	Roman Law	Singapore	05-May-01	Won: 26-8	1
81	Peter Moore	Singapore	05-May-01	Won: 26-8	2
82	Terrence Brink	Singapore	05-May-01	Won: 26-8	4
83	Adam Horler	Singapore	05-May-01	Won: 26-8	6
84	Michael Kerr	Singapore	07-Feb-02	Won: 57-8	6
85	James Wood	Singapore	07-Feb-02	Won: 57-8	27
86	Jarrad Gallagher	Singapore	07-Feb-02	Won: 57-8	5
87	Ricky Cheuk	Singapore	07-Feb-02	Won: 57-8	14
88	Steve Daniel	Singapore	07-Feb-02	Won: 57-8	2
89	Andrew Chambers	Singapore	07-Feb-02	Won: 57-8	22
90	Alex Zenovic	Thailand	12-Apr-02	Won: 15-8	8
91	Liu Kwok-leung	Thailand	12-Apr-02	Won: 15-8	16
92	Damian Babis	Arabian Gulf	20-Apr-02	Won: 17-7	3
93	Peter Spizzirri	Singapore	01-Nov-02	Won: 10-3	41
94	Jon Abel	Singapore	01-Nov-02	Won: 10-3	29
95	Andy Yuen Kin Ho	Singapore	01-Nov-02	Won: 10-3	20
96	Lachlin Miller	Singapore	01-Nov-02	Won: 10-3	12
97	Peter Clough	Singapore	01-Nov-02	Won: 10-3	6
98	Graham Black	Singapore	01-Nov-02	Won: 10-3	5
99	Paul Chiu Kin-Pong	Japan	17-Nov-02	Lost: 29-15	4
100	Chris Conbeer	Singapore	01-Nov-02	Won: 10-3	4
101	George Di Koon On	Singapore	01-Nov-02	Won: 10-3	1
102	Dave Atkinson	Japan	17-Nov-02	Lost: 29-15	1
103	Simon Hague	South Korea	20-Nov-02	Lost: 40-17	7
104	Ryan McBride	Chinese-Taipei	23-Nov-02	Won: 18-16	4
105	Brett Shields	Chinese-Taipei	13-Sep-03	Won: 21-19	1
106	Clinton Heaps	Chinese-Taipei	13-Sep-03	Won: 21-19	1
107	Ben Harris	Chinese-Taipei	13-Sep-03	Won: 21-19	8
108	Chung Chun-sang	Chinese-Taipei	13-Sep-03	Won: 21-19	7
109	Andrew WongKee	Chinese-Taipei	13-Sep-03	Won: 21-19	11
110	Alex Gibbs	Chinese-Taipei	13-Sep-03	Won: 21-19	3
111	Stuart Denton	Sri Lanka	11-Oct-03	Won: 36-22	2
112	Tom Cameron	Japan	19-Oct-03	Lost: 90-5	16
113	Junior Su’a	Japan	19-Oct-03	Lost: 90-5	1
114	Ivan Zenovic	Japan	19-Oct-03	Lost: 90-5	16
115	Brett Forsyth	Arabian Gulf	09-May-04	Won: 12-5	9
116	Leung Ming-hong	Arabian Gulf	09-May-04	Won: 12-5	9
117	Richard Draycott	Arabian Gulf	09-May-04	Won: 12-5	3
118	Tim O’Connor	Arabian Gulf	09-May-04	Won: 12-5	5
119	Mark Wright	Arabian Gulf	09-May-04	Won: 12-5	19
120	Michael Russell	Singapore	22-May-04	Won: 47-14	4
121	Rowan Varty	Singapore	22-May-04	Won: 47-14	43
122	Danny O'Connor	Japan	28-Oct-04	Lost: 40-12	6
123	Bryan O'Hara	Japan	28-Oct-04	Lost: 40-12	3
124	Andrew Randall	Japan	08-May-05	Lost: 91-3	2
125	Kwok Ka Chun	Japan	08-May-05	Lost: 91-3	18
126	Paul Gaffney	Japan	08-May-05	Lost: 91-3	2
127	Tsang Hing Hung	Japan	08-May-05	Lost: 91-3	11
128	Paul Morehu	Japan	08-May-05	Lost: 91-3	5
129	Simon Leung	Singapore	29-Apr-06	Won: 26-14	25
130	Ben Ho Tsz Chun	Singapore	29-Apr-06	Won: 26-14	7
131	Nigel Clarke	Singapore	29-Apr-06	Won: 26-14	25
132	Jarrad Brownlee	Singapore	29-Apr-06	Won: 26-14	3
133	Semi Iefeta	Singapore	29-Apr-06	Won: 26-14	13
134	Simon Smith	Singapore	29-Apr-06	Won: 26-14	20
135	Ben Tibbott	Singapore	29-Apr-06	Won: 26-14	3
136	Colin Bisley	Japan	18-Nov-06	Lost: 52-3	11
137	Fan Shun-kei	Japan	18-Nov-06	Lost: 52-3	8
138	Nigel Hobler	Japan	18-Nov-06	Lost: 52-3	19
139	Brandon Huang Yao Bin	Japan	18-Nov-06	Lost: 52-3	1
140	Kris Marin	Japan	18-Nov-06	Lost: 52-3	11
141	Justin Temara	South Korea	21-Nov-06	Lost: 25-3	9
142	Tom Breen	Japan	29-Apr-07	Lost: 73-3	2
143	Gavin Hadley	Japan	29-Apr-07	Lost: 73-3	11
144	Anthony Haynes	Japan	29-Apr-07	Lost: 73-3	9
145	Nick Hurrell	Japan	29-Apr-07	Lost: 73-3	15
146	Tamas King	Japan	29-Apr-07	Lost: 73-3	2
147	Lai Yiu Pang	Japan	29-Apr-07	Lost: 73-3	3
148	Tom Mutch	Japan	29-Apr-07	Lost: 73-3	2
149	Kenzo Pannell	Japan	29-Apr-07	Lost: 73-3	17
150	Jon Elliot	Chinese-Taipei	06-Jan-08	Won: 64-17	8
151	Graham Manchester	Chinese-Taipei	06-Jan-08	Won: 64-17	3
152	Mike McKee	Chinese-Taipei	06-Jan-08	Won: 64-17	9
153	Alex Ng Wai Shing	Chinese-Taipei	06-Jan-08	Won: 64-17	51
154	Edmund Rolston	Chinese-Taipei	06-Jan-08	Won: 64-17	12
155	Wayne Whitney	Chinese-Taipei	06-Jan-08	Won: 64-17	7
156	Renaud Chavanis	Tunisia	05-Apr-08	Won: 25-12	19
157	Laurence Denvir	Tunisia	05-Apr-08	Won: 25-12	6
158	Simon Hempel	Tunisia	05-Apr-08	Won: 25-12	12
159	Will Wong Wai Kong	Arabian Gulf	26-Apr-08	Won: 20-12	1
160	Alex McQueen	Japan	18-May-08	Lost: 75-29	33
161	Adam Raby	Japan	02-May-09	Lost: 59-6	10
162	Angus Washington	Japan	02-May-09	Lost: 59-6	4
163	Jeff Wong Chun Kiu	Japan	02-May-09	Lost: 59-6	4
164	Grapes Lai Tsz Leung	Japan	02-May-09	Lost: 59-6	4
165	Sebastian Perkins	Japan	02-May-09	Lost: 59-6	4
166	Timothy Alexander	Japan	02-May-09	Lost: 59-6	20
167	Fraser Smith	South Korea	09-May-09	Lost: 36-34	1
168	Keith Robertson	Kazakhstan	24-May-09	Lost: 25-6	18
169	Charles Cheung Ho Ning	Kazakhstan	24-May-09	Lost: 25-6	11
170	Alex Baddeley	Germany	12-Dec-09	Lost: 14-24	20
171	So Hok Ken	Germany	12-Dec-09	Lost: 14-24	5
172	Tom McColl	Germany	12-Dec-09	Lost: 14-24	21
173	Nick Hewson	Germany	12-Dec-09	Lost: 14-24	58
174	Charles French	Germany	12-Dec-09	Lost: 14-24	24
175	Andrew Li Gah Wai	Germany	12-Dec-09	Lost: 14-24	11
176	Jack Bennett	Germany	12-Dec-09	Lost: 14-24	17
177	Salom Yiu Kam Shing	Czech Republic	16-Dec-09	Lost: 5-17	49
178	James Kibble	South Korea	24-Apr-10	Won: 32-8	3
179	Tom McQueen	South Korea	24-Apr-10	Won: 32-8	18
180	James Stokes	Japan	22-May-10	Lost: 5-94	1
181	Hsieh Chun Hang	Japan	22-May-10	Lost: 5-94	8
182	Rory Hussey	Japan	22-May-10	Lost: 5-94	4
183	Mark Goosen	Germany	11-Dec-10	Lost: 13-34	12
184	Ross Armour	Germany	11-Dec-10	Lost: 13-34	10
185	Oliver Jones	Germany	11-Dec-10	Lost: 13-34	5
186	Chik Man Hon	Germany	11-Dec-10	Lost: 13-34	4
187	Matthew Nuttall	Germany	11-Dec-10	Lost: 13-34	4
188	Phil Leung	Germany	11-Dec-10	Lost: 13-34	3
189	Pale Tauti	Germany	11-Dec-10	Lost: 13-34	27
190	Matthew Price	Germany	11-Dec-10	Lost: 13-34	1
191	Lee Jones	Germany	11-Dec-10	Lost: 13-34	20
192	Alex Harris	Germany	11-Dec-10	Lost: 13-34	36
193	Niall Rowark	Norway	15-Dec-10	Won: 59-17	18
194	Hong Pak To	Norway	15-Dec-10	Won: 59-17	1
195	Leon Wei	Norway	15-Dec-10	Won: 59-17	19
196	Carl Rojens	Norway	15-Dec-10	Won: 59-17	1
197	Brent Taylor	Philippines	16-Apr-11	Won: 74-10	4
198	Guy Payn	Philippines	16-Apr-11	Won: 74-10	4
199	Pete McKee	Philippines	16-Apr-11	Won: 74-10	17
200	Michael Waller	Kazakhstan	23-Apr-11	Won: 23-10	6
201	Terence Montgomery	Kazakhstan	23-Apr-11	Won: 23-10	11
202	Jamie Hood	Kazakhstan	23-Apr-11	Won: 23-10	33
203	Stephen Nolan	United Arab Emirates	10-Dec-11	Won: 72-14	19
204	Daniel Watson	United Arab Emirates	10-Dec-11	Won: 72-14	12
205	Cado Lee	United Arab Emirates	10-Dec-11	Won: 72-14	24
206	Ally Maclay	United Arab Emirates	10-Dec-11	Won: 72-14	17
207	Tom Bolland	United Arab Emirates	10-Dec-11	Won: 72-14	19
208	Ian Ridgway	United Arab Emirates	10-Dec-11	Won: 72-14	12
209	Bill Brant	United Arab Emirates	10-Dec-11	Won: 72-14	13
210	Edward Haynes	United Arab Emirates	10-Dec-11	Won: 72-14	3
211	Michael Glancy	South Korea	05-May-12	Lost: 19-21	9
212	Matthew Lamming	Zimbabwe	08-Dec-12	Won: 22-7	31
213	Christopher McAdam	Zimbabwe	08-Dec-12	Won: 22-7	12
214	Craig Wilson	Zimbabwe	08-Dec-12	Won: 22-7	2
215	Stewart Megaw	Zimbabwe	08-Dec-12	Won: 22-7	5
216	Jonathan Rees	Zimbabwe	08-Dec-12	Won: 22-7	7
217	Matthew Stockdale	Zimbabwe	08-Dec-12	Won: 22-7	7
218	Sebastian Alfonsi	Zimbabwe	08-Dec-12	Won: 22-7	7
219	Hone Patrick	United Arab Emirates	11-Dec-12	Won: 51-6	1
220	Kirk Munro	Belgium	14-Dec-12	Lost: 12-24	3
221	James Cooper	United Arab Emirates	20-Apr-13	Won: 53-7	11
222	Will Hunt	United Arab Emirates	20-Apr-13	Won: 53-7	4
223	Dave Whiteford	United Arab Emirates	20-Apr-13	Won: 53-7	4
224	Dennis Chang	South Korea	18-May-13	Lost: 22-43	1
225	Paul Dwyer	Belgium	17-Dec-13	Won: 28-17	18
226	Andrew McCulla	Belgium	17-Dec-13	Won: 28-17	2
227	Jake Phelps	Belgium	17-Dec-13	Won: 28-17	7
228	Josh Li	Belgium	17-Dec-13	Won: 28-17	3
229	Ben Rimene	Belgium	17-Dec-13	Won: 28-17	20
230	Andrew Bridle	Belgium	17-Dec-13	Won: 28-17	4
231	Lloyd Jones	Philippines	26-Apr-14	Won: 108-0	6
232	Nick Wheatley	Philippines	26-Apr-14	Won: 108-0	3
233	Jack Delaforce	Sri Lanka	03-May-14	Won: 41-10	19
234	Lachlan Chubb	Japan	24-May-14	Lost: 8-49	10
235	John Aikman	Russia	08-Nov-14	Lost: 10-31	6
236	Duncan Pollock	Russia	08-Nov-14	Lost: 10-31	2
237	Max Woodward	Russia	08-Nov-14	Lost: 10-31	14
238	James Richards	Russia	08-Nov-14	Lost: 10-31	1
239	Jack Parfitt	Russia	08-Nov-14	Lost: 10-31	30
240	Reece Hamon	Russia	08-Nov-14	Lost: 10-31	2
241	Jack Neilsen	Russia	15-Nov-14	Lost: 39-27	4
242	Tyler Spitz	Russia	15-Nov-14	Lost: 39-27	28
243	Jack Capon	Russia	15-Nov-14	Lost: 39-27	1
244	Charlie Higson-Smith	South Korea	25-Apr-15	Lost: 26-33	13
245	Toby Fenn	South Korea	25-Apr-15	Lost: 26-33	23
246	Adam Butterfield	Japan	02-May-15	Lost: 0-41	2
247	Damian Bailey	Japan	02-May-15	Lost: 0-41	3
248	Adam Rolston	Japan	02-May-15	Lost: 0-41	3
249	Adrian Griffiths	South Korea	16-May-15	Won: 38-37	19
250	Jean-Baptiste Aldigè	Japan	23-May-15	Draw: 0-0	1
251	Rohan Cook	Zimbabwe	13-Nov-15	Won: 30-11	7
252	James Cunningham	Zimbabwe	13-Nov-15	Won: 30-11	35
253	Tom Marshall	Zimbabwe	13-Nov-15	Won: 30-11	3
254	Brad Raper	Zimbabwe	13-Nov-15	Won: 30-11	2
255	Lex Kaleca	Zimbabwe	13-Nov-15	Won: 30-11	18
256	Jamie Tsang	Zimbabwe	13-Nov-15	Won: 30-11	17
257	Jamie Pincott	Zimbabwe	13-Nov-15	Won: 30-11	10
258	Jamie Robinson	Zimbabwe	13-Nov-15	Won: 30-11	8
259	Adam Fullgrabe	Portugal	17-Nov-15	Won: 13-6	13
260	Dan Falvey	Portugal	17-Nov-15	Won: 13-6	12
261	Ryan Meacheam	Japan	07-May-16	Lost: 3-38	6
262	Ben Higgins	Japan	28-May-16	Lost: 17-59	26
263	Tony Ho Yeung Wong	Japan	28-May-16	Lost: 17-59	3
264	Finlay Field	South Korea	04-Jun-16	Won: 41-15	11
265	Liam Owens	Kenya	27-Aug-16	Lost: 10-34	1
266	Matthew Rosslee	Kenya	27-Aug-16	Lost: 10-34	25
267	Alex Post	Kenya	27-Aug-16	Lost: 10-34	14
268	Michael Parfitt	Kenya	27-Aug-16	Lost: 10-34	12
269	Joey Cheung	Kenya	27-Aug-16	Lost: 10-34	1
270	Hugo Stiles	Kenya	27-Aug-16	Lost: 10-34	1
271	Calvin Hunter	Papua New Guinea	11-Nov-16	Won: 51-5	1
272	Will Evershield	Papua New Guinea	11-Nov-16	Won: 51-5	3
273	Matt Lamont	Papua New Guinea	11-Nov-16	Won: 51-5	1
274	JW Markley	Papua New Guinea	11-Nov-16	Won: 51-5	5
275	Jason Jeyam	Papua New Guinea	11-Nov-16	Won: 51-5	2
276	Ben Roberts	Zimbabwe	14-Nov-16	Won: 34-11	15
277	Thomas Lamboley	Zimbabwe	14-Nov-16	Won: 34-11	19
278	Marcus Ramage	Zimbabwe	14-Nov-16	Won: 34-11	5
279	Dylan Rogers	Japan	06-May-17	Lost: 17-29	13
280	Phil Whitfield	Japan	06-May-17	Lost: 17-29	2
281	Angus Dixon	Japan	06-May-17	Lost: 17-29	3
282	Kyle Sullivan	Japan	06-May-17	Lost: 17-29	21
283	Rob Kieth	Japan	06-May-17	Lost: 17-29	11
284	Liam Slatem	Kenya	20-Aug-17	Draw: 19-19	15
285	Sam Purvis	Kenya	20-Aug-17	Draw: 19-19	4
286	Liam Gallaher	Kenya	20-Aug-17	Draw: 19-19	2
287	Dayne Jans	Kenya	20-Aug-17	Draw: 19-19	9
288	Dan Barlow	Kenya	20-Aug-17	Draw: 19-19	18
289	Pierce Mackinlay-West	Kenya	20-Aug-17	Draw: 19-19	5
290	James Christie	Kenya	26-Aug-17	Won: 43-34	1
291	Evi Saua	Kenya	26-Aug-17	Won: 43-34	1
292	Conor Hartley	Russia	10-Nov-17	Lost: 13-16	10
293	Mike Coverdale	Russia	10-Nov-17	Lost: 13-16	3
294	Kane Boucaut	Russia	10-Nov-17	Lost: 13-16	14
295	Jack Neville	Russia	10-Nov-17	Lost: 13-16	17
296	Callum McFeat Smith	Kenya	18-Nov-17	Won: 40-30	5
297	Max Denmark	Kenya	18-Nov-17	Won: 40-30	8
298	Jamie Lauder	Malaysia	28-Apr-18	Won: 67-8	15
299	Ted Soppet	Malaysia	28-Apr-18	Won: 67-8	1
300	Ronan Donnelly	Malaysia	28-Apr-18	Won: 67-8	1
301	Cris Pierrepoint	Malaysia	28-Apr-18	Won: 67-8	5
302	Henry Poon	Malaysia	28-Apr-18	Won: 67-8	1
303	Grant Kemp	Germany	11-Nov-18	Lost: 9-26	5
304	Casey Stone	Germany	11-Nov-18	Lost: 9-26	2
305	Bryn Phillips	Germany	11-Nov-18	Lost: 9-26	13
306	Lewis Warner	Germany	11-Nov-18	Lost: 9-26	8
307	Ben Axten Burrett	Kenya	17-Nov-18	Won: 42-17	12
308	Craig Lodge	Canada	23-Nov-18	Lost: 10-27	5
309	Callum McCullough	South Korea	08-Jun-19	Won: 47-10	8
310	Harry Sayers	South Korea	08-Jun-19	Won: 47-10	9
311	Paul Altier	South Korea	08-Jun-19	Won: 47-10	8
312	Seb Brien	Malaysia	15-Jun-19	Won: 30-24	7
313	Mitch Andrews	Malaysia	15-Jun-19	Won: 30-24	5
314	Keelan Chapman	Malaysia	15-Jun-19	Won: 30-24	6
315	Sam Tsoi	Malaysia	15-Jun-19	Won: 30-24	7
316	Faizal Solomona	Malaysia	22-Jun-19	Won: 71-0	11
317	Tom Bristow	Belgium	16-Nov-19	Won: 36-17	2
318	Tau Koloamatangi	Belgium	16-Nov-19	Won: 36-17	1
319	Mark Prior	Belgium	16-Nov-19	Won: 36-17	8
320	Lawrence Miller	Belgium	16-Nov-19	Won: 36-17	2
321	James Sawyer	Belgium	16-Nov-19	Won: 36-17	7
322	Josh Dowsing	Belgium	16-Nov-19	Won: 36-17	2
323	Gregor McNeish	Belgium	16-Nov-19	Won: 36-17	8
324	Nate De Thierry	Belgium	16-Nov-19	Won: 36-17	11
325	Guy Spanton	Belgium	16-Nov-19	Won: 36-17	5
326	Ashton Hyde	South Korea	09-Jul-22	Won: 23-21	6
327	Patrick Jenkinson	South Korea	09-Jul-22	Won: 23-21	6
328	Josh Hrstich	South Korea	09-Jul-22	Won: 23-21	8
329	Glyn Hughes	South Korea	09-Jul-22	Won: 23-21	1
330	Matt Worley	South Korea	09-Jul-22	Won: 23-21	7
331	Tom Hill	South Korea	09-Jul-22	Won: 23-21	8
332	John McCormick-Houston	South Korea	09-Jul-22	Won: 23-21	7
333	Ian Etheridge	South Korea	09-Jul-22	Won: 23-21	3
334	Zac Cinnamond	South Korea	09-Jul-22	Won: 23-21	7
335	Luke Van Der Smit	South Korea	09-Jul-22	Won: 23-21	9
336	Jack Coombes	South Korea	09-Jul-22	Won: 23-21	5
337	Gregor Ramage	Tonga	23-Jul-22	Lost: 44-22	3
338	Will Panday	Tonga	23-Jul-22	Lost: 44-22	3
339	Sean Taylor	Portugal	06-Nov-22	Lost: 42-14	3
340	Nik Cumming	USA	12-Nov-22	Lost: 49-7	1
341	Jak Lam	Kenya	18-Nov-22	Won: 22-18	1
342	David Tang	Malaysia	10-Jun-23	Won: 88-9	1
343	Dylan White	South Korea	17-Jun-23	Won: 30-10	1
344	Matt Keay	South Korea	17-Jun-23	Won: 30-10	1
345	Tyler McNutt	Germany	14-Nov-23	Won: 29-16	1
346	Jude Harding	Germany	14-Nov-23	Won: 29-16	2
347	Hugh McCormick-Houston	Germany	14-Nov-23	Won: 29-16	1
348	Rory Cinnamond	Germany	18-Nov-23	Won: 46-10	1
349	Harry Laidler	Germany	18-Nov-23	Won: 46-10	1
350	Jack Abbott	Germany	18-Nov-23	Won: 46-10	1
351	Murray Brechin	Germany	18-Nov-23	Won: 46-10	1
352	Liam Edwards	Germany	18-Nov-23	Won: 46-10	1

Total Caps in Order of Caps Won

This list is for all full international Test matches played since 1st July 1997.

Full Name	Caps
Nick Hewson	58
Alex Ng Wai Shing	51
Salom Yiu Kam Shing	49
Rowan Varty	43
Peter Spizzirri	41
Alex Harris	36
Jason Going	35
Rob Naylor	35
James Cunningham	35
Alex McQueen	33
Jamie Hood	33
Chan Fuk-ping	31
Matthew Lamming	31
Jack Parfitt	30
Jon Abel	29
Tyler Spitz	28
James Wood	27
Pale Tauti	27
Ben Higgins	26
Simon Leung	25
Nigel Clarke	25
Matthew Rosslee	25
Charles French	24
Cado Lee	24
Toby Fenn	23
Paul Dingley	22
Andrew Chambers	22
Tom McColl	21
Kyle Sullivan	21
Justin Gregory	20
Andy Yuen Kin Ho	20
Simon Smith	20
Timothy Alexander	20
Alex Baddeley	20
Lee Jones	20
Ben Rimene	20
Mark Wright	19
Nigel Hobler	19
Renaud Chavanis	19
Leon Wei	19
Stephen Nolan	19
Tom Bolland	19
Jack Delaforce	19
Adrian Griffiths	19
Thomas Lamboley	19
Lee Cheuk-yin	18
Kwok Ka Chun	18
Keith Robertson	18
Tom McQueen	18
Niall Rowark	18
Paul Dwyer	18
Lex Kaleca	18
Dan Barlow	18
Kenzo Pannell	17
Jack Bennett	17
Pete McKee	17
Ally Maclay	17
Jamie Tsang	17
Jack Neville	17
Chris Gordon	16
Liu Kwok-leung	16
Tom Cameron	16
Ivan Zenovic	16
Kelvin Yip Kwok Ho	15
Nick Hurrell	15
Ben Roberts	15
Liam Slatem	15
Jamie Lauder	15
Ricky Cheuk	14
Max Woodward	14
Alex Post	14
Kane Boucaut	14
Roger Patterson	13
Brent Edwards	13
Mark Solomon	13
Duncan Robertson	13
Semi Iefeta	13
Bill Brant	13
Charlie Higson-Smith	13
Adam Fullgrabe	13
Dylan Rogers	13
Bryn Phillips	13
Rory Dickson	12
Lachlin Miller	12
Edmund Rolston	12
Simon Hempel	12
Mark Goosen	12
Daniel Watson	12
Ian Ridgway	12
Christopher McAdam	12
Dan Falvey	12
Michael Parfitt	12
Ben Axten Burrett	12
Steve Kidd	11
Robin Bredbury	11
Warren Warner	11
David Wigley	11
Andrew WongKee	11
Tsang Hing Hung	11
Colin Bisley	11
Kris Marin	11
Gavin Hadley	11
Charles Cheung Ho Ning	11
Andrew Li Gah Wai	11
Terence Montgomery	11
James Cooper	11
Finlay Field	11
Rob Kieth	11
Faizal Solomona	11
Nate De Thierry	11
Nigel D'Acre	10
Carl Murray	10
Rambo Leung	10
Adam Raby	10
Ross Armour	10
Lachlan Chubb	10
Jamie Pincott	10
Conor Hartley	10
Jon Dingley	9
Rodney McIntosh	9
Tom Hall	9
Matthew Deayton	9
Bryce Dailly	9
Owain Morrison	9
Mark Loynd	9
Brett Forsyth	9
Leung Ming-hong	9
Justin Temara	9
Anthony Haynes	9
Mike McKee	9
Michael Glancy	9
Dayne Jans	9
Harry Sayers	9
Luke Van Der Smit	9
Dave Lewis	8
Luciano Afeaki	8
Rick Shuttleworth	8
Hamish Bowden	8
Jon Clark	8
Jack Wilson	8
Alex Zenovic	8
Ben Harris	8
Fan Shun-kei	8
Jon Elliot	8
Hsieh Chun Hang	8
Jamie Robinson	8
Max Denmark	8
Lewis Warner	8
Callum McCullough	8
Paul Altier	8
Mark Prior	8
Gregor McNeish	8
Josh Hrstich	8
Tom Hill	8
Rob Grindlay	7
Peter Choy	7
Glen Tracey	7
Simon Hague	7
Chung Chun-sang	7
Ben Ho Tsz Chun	7
Wayne Whitney	7
Jonathan Rees	7
Matthew Stockdale	7
Sebastian Alfonsi	7
Jake Phelps	7
Rohan Cook	7
Seb Brien	7
Sam Tsoi	7
James Sawyer	7
Matt Worley	7
John McCormick-Houston	7
Zac Cinnamond	7
Adam Kelly	6
Andrew Barr	6
Steve Pengelly	6
John Gordon	6
Chris Yates	6
Luke Nabaro	6
Roger Leeson	6
Vaughan Going	6
Ian Cooke	6
Leighton Duley	6
Allan Warner	6
Paul Chung Pui Wah	6
Chris Brooke	6
Adam Horler	6
Michael Kerr	6
Peter Clough	6
Danny O'Connor	6
Laurence Denvir	6
Michael Waller	6
Lloyd Jones	6
John Aikman	6
Ryan Meacheam	6
Keelan Chapman	6
Ashton Hyde	6
Patrick Jenkinson	6
Will Wild	5
Jarrad Gallagher	5
Graham Black	5
Tim O’Connor	5
Paul Morehu	5
So Hok Ken	5
Oliver Jones	5
Stewart Megaw	5
JW Markley	5
Marcus Ramage	5
Pierce Mackinlay-West	5
Callum McFeat Smith	5
Cris Pierrepoint	5
Grant Kemp	5
Craig Lodge	5
Mitch Andrews	5
Guy Spanton	5
Jack Coombes	5
Dean Herewini	4
Wes Packer	4
Ross Duncan	4
Tony Wong	4
Terrence Brink	4
Paul Chiu Kin-Pong	4
Chris Conbeer	4
Ryan McBride	4
Michael Russell	4
Angus Washington	4
Jeff Wong Chun Kiu	4
Grapes Lai Tsz Leung	4
Sebastian Perkins	4
Rory Hussey	4
Chik Man Hon	4
Matthew Nuttall	4
Brent Taylor	4
Guy Payn	4
Will Hunt	4
Dave Whiteford	4
Andrew Bridle	4
Jack Neilsen	4
Sam Purvis	4
Chris North	3
Sean O'Hara	3
Stephen Thompson	3
James Burbidge-King	3
Sam Kynaston	3
Mark Avery	3
Simon Tasker	3
Ken Carnduff	3
Matt Reede	3
Damian Babis	3
Alex Gibbs	3
Richard Draycott	3
Bryan O'Hara	3
Jarrad Brownlee	3
Ben Tibbott	3
Lai Yiu Pang	3
Graham Manchester	3
James Kibble	3
Phil Leung	3
Edward Haynes	3
Kirk Munro	3
Josh Li	3
Nick Wheatley	3
Damian Bailey	3
Adam Rolston	3
Tom Marshall	3
Tony Ho Yeung Wong	3
Will Evershield	3
Angus Dixon	3
Mike Coverdale	3
Ian Etheridge	3
Gregor Ramage	3
Will Panday	3
Sean Taylor	3
Alan Clark	2
Ashley Billington	2
Toby Bland	2
Isi Tu'ivai	2
Geoff Hurrell	2
Gary W.K. Yeung	2
Andrew Dailly	2
Dean McLachlan	2
Peter Moore	2
Steve Daniel	2
Stuart Denton	2
Andrew Randall	2
Paul Gaffney	2
Tom Breen	2
Tamas King	2
Tom Mutch	2
Craig Wilson	2
Andrew McCulla	2
Duncan Pollock	2
Reece Hamon	2
Adam Butterfield	2
Brad Raper	2
Jason Jeyam	2
Phil Whitfield	2
Liam Gallaher	2
Casey Stone	2
Tom Bristow	2
Lawrence Miller	2
Josh Dowsing	2
Jude Harding	2
Rob McDonald	1
Charles Scragg	1
J Hillhind	1
Joel Dunn	1
Lam Kwong Shun	1
Jung Ho Jung	1
Troy Sing	1
Kenneth Au	1
Roman Law	1
George Di Koon On	1
Dave Atkinson	1
Brett Shields	1
Clinton Heaps	1
Junior Su’a	1
Brandon Huang Yao Bin	1
Will Wong Wai Kong	1
Fraser Smith	1
James Stokes	1
Matthew Price	1
Hong Pak To	1
Carl Rojens	1
Hone Patrick	1
Dennis Chang	1
James Richards	1
Jack Capon	1
Jean-Baptiste Aldigè	1
Liam Owens	1
Joey Cheung	1
Hugo Stiles	1
Calvin Hunter	1
Matt Lamont	1
James Christie	1
Evi Saua	1
Ted Soppet	1
Ronan Donnelly	1
Henry Poon	1
Tau Koloamatangi	1
Glyn Hughes	1
Nik Cumming	1
Jak Lam	1
David Tang	1
Dylan White	1
Matt Keay	1
Tyler McNutt	1
Hugh McCormick-Houston	1
Rory Cinnamond	1
Harry Laidler	1
Jack Abbott	1
Murray Brechin	1
Liam Edwards	1

International Test Matches Played since Hong Kong SAR Establishment [1st July 1997]

No.	Date	Opposition	Result	Score For	Score Against	Venue Country
1	9 May 1998	Canada	Won	23	17	Hong Kong
2	16 May 1998	USA	Won	43	25	Hong Kong
3	23 May 1998	Japan	Lost	31	38	Hong Kong
4	7 Jun 1998	Japan	Won	17	16	Japan
5	13 Jun 1998	Canada	Lost	12	38	Canada
6	20 Jun 1998	USA	Won	27	17	USA
7	24 Oct 1998	Chinese-Taipei	Lost	12	30	Singapore
8	27 Oct 1998	South Korea	Won	20	11	Singapore
9	31 Oct 1998	Japan	Lost	7	47	Singapore
10	15 May 1999	Singapore	Won	12	10	Singapore
11	18 May 1999	Chinese-Taipei	Draw	19	19	Taiwan
12	29 May 1999	Singapore	Won	25	5	Hong Kong
13	8 Jun 1999	Chinese-Taipei	Won	55	10	Hong Kong
14	6 May 2000	Singapore	Won	30	6	Hong Kong
15	13 May 2000	Chinese-Taipei	Won	38	22	Taiwan
16	10 Jun 2000	China	Lost	15	17	China
17	25 Jun 2000	Japan	Lost	0	75	Japan
18	28 Jun 2000	South Korea	Lost	36	38	Japan
19	2 Jul 2000	Chinese-Taipei	Lost	13	25	Japan
20	5 May 2001	Singapore	Won	26	8	Singapore
21	12 May 2001	China	Draw	25	25	China
22	7 Feb 2002	Singapore	Won	57	8	Hong Kong
23	12 Apr 2002	Thailand	Won	15	8	Thailand
24	20 Apr 2002	Arabian Gulf	Won	17	7	Hong Kong
25	18 May 2002	Chinese-Taipei	Lost	15	20	Taiwan
26	1 Jun 2002	China	Won	34	7	Hong Kong
27	1 Nov 2002	Singapore	Won	10	3	Singapore
28	17 Nov 2002	Japan	Lost	15	29	Thailand
29	20 Nov 2002	South Korea	Lost	17	40	Thailand
30	23 Nov 2002	Chinese-Taipei	Won	18	16	Thailand
31	13 Sep 2003	Chinese-Taipei	Won	21	19	Hong Kong
32	11 Oct 2003	Sri Lanka	Won	36	22	Sri Lanka
33	19 Oct 2003	Japan	Lost	5	90	Japan
34	9 May 2004	Arabian Gulf	Won	12	5	Hong Kong
35	22 May 2004	Singapore	Won	47	14	Singapore
36	5 Jun 2004	China	Won	27	9	Hong Kong
37	28 Oct 2004	Japan	Lost	12	40	Hong Kong
38	31 Oct 2004	Chinese-Taipei	Won	29	5	Hong Kong
39	8 May 2005	Japan	Lost	3	91	Japan
40	22 May 2005	South Korea	Lost	3	56	Hong Kong
41	29 Apr 2006	Singapore	Won	26	14	Singapore
42	14 May 2006	Sri Lanka	Won	45	14	Hong Kong
43	21 May 2006	China	Won	23	7	China
44	18 Nov 2006	Japan	Lost	3	52	Hong Kong
45	21 Nov 2006	South Korea	Lost	3	25	Hong Kong
46	29 Apr 2007	Japan	Lost	3	73	Japan
47	28 May 2007	South Korea	Won	27	20	Hong Kong
48	28 May 2007	Japan	Lost	3	73	Japan
49	6 Jan 2008	Chinese-Taipei	Won	64	17	Hong Kong
50	9 Jan 2008	Chinese-Taipei	Won	54	27	Hong Kong
51	5 Apr 2008	Tunisia	Won	25	12	Hong Kong
52	12 Apr 2008	Tunisia	Lost	9	29	Tunisia
53	26 Apr 2008	Arabian Gulf	Won	20	12	UAE
54	3 May 2008	Kazakhstan	Won	23	17	Hong Kong
55	18 May 2008	Japan	Lost	29	75	Japan
56	24 May 2008	South Korea	Lost	24	50	Hong Kong
57	2 May 2009	Japan	Lost	6	59	Hong Kong
58	9 May 2009	South Korea	Lost	34	36	South Korea
59	16 May 2009	Singapore	Won	64	6	Hong Kong
60	24 May 2009	Kazakhstan	Lost	6	25	Kazakhstan
61	12 Dec 2009	Germany	Lost	14	24	Germany
62	16 Dec 2009	Czech Republic	Lost	5	17	Czech Republic
63	19 Dec 2009	Holland	Lost	10	25	Holland
64	24 Apr 2010	South Korea	Won	32	8	Hong Kong
65	30 Apr 2010	Arabian Gulf	Lost	9	16	Bahrain
66	8 May 2010	Kazakhstan	Won	19	15	Hong Kong
67	22 May 2010	Japan	Lost	5	94	Japan
68	11 Dec 2010	Germany	Lost	13	34	Germany
69	15 Dec 2010	Norway	Won	59	17	Norway
70	16 Apr 2011	Philippines	Won	74	10	Philippines
71	23 Apr 2011	Kazakhstan	Won	23	10	Kazakhstan
72	30 Apr 2011	Japan	Lost	22	45	Hong Kong
73	7 May 2011	Sri Lanka	Won	48	3	Sri Lanka
74	21 May 2011	United Arab Emirates	Won	62	3	Hong Kong
75	10 Dec 2011	United Arab Emirates	Won	72	14	UAE
76	13 Dec 2011	Kenya	Won	44	12	UAE
77	16 Dec 2011	Brazil	Won	37	3	UAE
78	27 Apr 2012	United Arab Emirates	Won	85	10	UAE
79	5 May 2012	South Korea	Lost	19	21	Hong Kong
80	19 May 2012	Japan	Lost	0	67	Japan
81	26 May 2012	Kazakhstan	Won	55	0	Hong Kong
82	8 Dec 2012	Zimbabwe	Won	22	7	UAE
83	11 Dec 2012	United Arab Emirates	Won	51	6	UAE
84	14 Dec 2012	Belgium	Lost	12	24	UAE
85	20 Apr 2013	United Arab Emirates	Won	53	7	Hong Kong
86	27 Apr 2013	Japan	Lost	0	38	Hong Kong
87	4 May 2013	Philippines	Won	59	20	Philippines
88	18 May 2013	South Korea	Lost	22	43	South Korea
89	17 Dec 2013	Belgium	Won	28	17	Hong Kong
90	21 Dec 2013	Belgium	Won	18	15	Hong Kong
91	26 Apr 2014	Philippines	Won	108	0	Hong Kong
92	3 May 2014	Sri Lanka	Won	41	10	Sri Lanka
93	10 May 2014	South Korea	Won	39	6	Hong Kong
94	24 May 2014	Japan	Lost	8	49	Japan
95	2 Aug 2014	Uruguay	Lost	3	28	Uruguay
96	8 Nov 2014	Russia	Lost	10	31	Hong Kong
97	15 Nov 2014	Russia	Lost	27	39	Hong Kong
98	25 Apr 2015	South Korea	Lost	26	33	Hong Kong
99	2 May 2015	Japan	Lost	0	41	Japan
100	16 May 2015	South Korea	Won	38	37	South Korea
101	23 May 2015	Japan	Draw	0	0	Hong Kong
102	13 Nov 2015	Zimbabwe	Won	30	11	Hong Kong
103	17 Nov 2015	Portugal	Won	13	6	Hong Kong
104	21 Nov 2015	Russia	Lost	12	31	Hong Kong
105	7 May 2016	Japan	Lost	3	38	Hong Kong
106	14 May 2016	South Korea	Won	34	27	South Korea
107	28 May 2016	Japan	Lost	17	59	Japan
108	4 Jun 2016	South Korea	Won	41	15	Hong Kong
109	27 Aug 2016	Kenya	Lost	10	34	Kenya
110	11 Nov 2016	Papua New Guinea	Won	51	5	Hong Kong
111	14 Nov 2016	Zimbabwe	Won	34	11	Hong Kong
112	19 Nov 2016	Russia	Lost	0	27	Hong Kong
113	6 May 2017	Japan	Lost	17	29	Japan
114	13 May 2017	Japan	Lost	0	16	Hong Kong
115	27 May 2017	South Korea	Won	43	17	South Korea
116	3 Jun 2017	South Korea	Won	39	3	Hong Kong
117	20 Aug 2017	Kenya	Draw	19	19	Kenya
118	26 Aug 2017	Kenya	Won	43	34	Kenya
119	10 Nov 2017	Russia	Lost	13	16	Hong Kong
120	14 Nov 2017	Chile	Won	6	13	Hong Kong
121	18 Nov 2017	Kenya	Won	40	30	Hong Kong
122	28 Apr 2018	Malaysia	Won	67	8	Malaysia
123	12 May 2018	South Korea	Won	30	21	South Korea
124	26 May 2018	Malaysia	Won	91	10	Hong Kong
125	2 Jun 2018	South Korea	Won	39	5	Hong Kong
126	30 Jun 2018	Cook Islands	Won	26	3	Cook Islands
127	7 Jul 2018	Cook Islands	Won	51	0	Hong Kong
128	11 Nov 2018	Germany	Lost	9	26	France
129	17 Nov 2018	Kenya	Won	42	17	France
130	23 Nov 2018	Canada	Lost	10	27	France
131	8 Jun 2019	South Korea	Won	47	10	South Korea
132	15 Jun 2019	Malaysia	Won	30	24	Hong Kong
133	22 Jun 2019	Malaysia	Won	71	0	Malaysia
134	29 Jun 2019	South Korea	Won	64	3	Hong Kong
135	16 Nov 2019	Belgium	Won	36	17	Belgium
136	23 Nov 2019	Spain	Lost	7	29	Spain
137	9 Jul 2022	South Korea	Won	23	21	South Korea
138	23 Jul 2022	Tonga	Lost	22	44	Australia
139	6 Nov 2022	Portugal	Lost	14	42	UAE
140	12 Nov 2022	USA	Lost	7	49	UAE
141	18 Nov 2022	Kenya	Won	22	18	UAE
142	10 Jun 2023	Malaysia	Won	88	9	Hong Kong
143	17 Jun 2023	South Korea	Won	30	10	Hong Kong
144	14 Nov 2023	Germany	Won	29	16	Hong Kong
145	18 Nov 2023	Germany	Won	46	10	Hong Kong
