= Carl Murray =

Carl Murray may refer to:

- Carl D. Murray, Irish planetary scientist
- Carl Murray (rugby union), New Zealand rugby player

== See also ==
- Karl Murray, English footballer
