= Taine Murray =

New Zealand basketball player (born 2002)

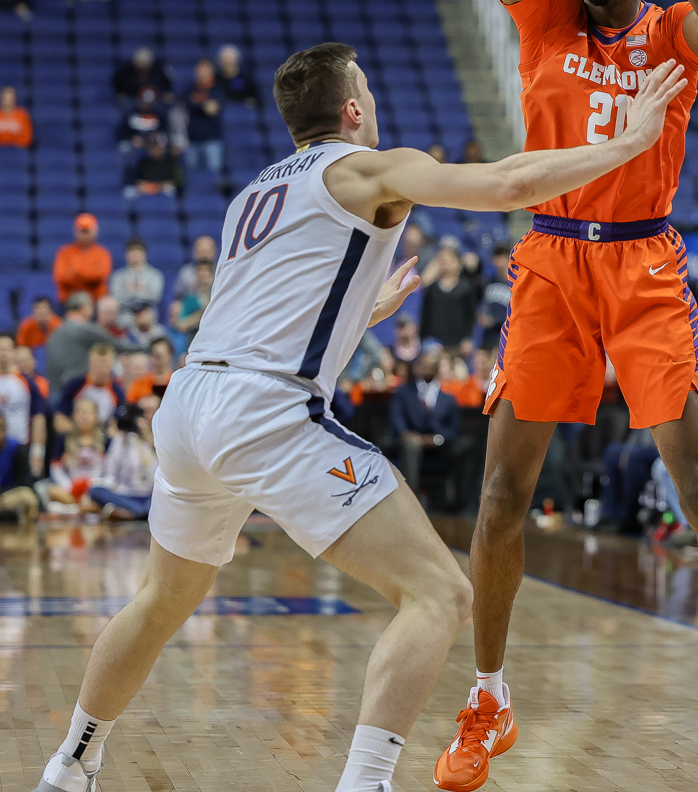
- Murray with the Virginia Cavaliers in 2023

No. 0 – Brisbane Bullets
- Position: Shooting guard
- League: NBL

Personal information
- Born: 19 April 2002 (age 24) Hong Kong
- Listed height: 6 ft 5 in (1.96 m)
- Listed weight: 205 lb (93 kg)

Career information
- High school: Rosmini College (Auckland, New Zealand)
- College: Virginia (2021–2025)
- NBA draft: 2025: undrafted
- Playing career: 2020–present

Career history
- 2020: Auckland Huskies
- 2020–2021: New Zealand Breakers
- 2025–present: Brisbane Bullets
- 2026: Tauranga Whai
Medals
Men's basketball
Representing New Zealand
FIBA Asia Cup
Bronze medal – third place	2022 Jakarta

Taine Jackson Murray (born 19 April 2002) is a New Zealand professional basketball player for the Brisbane Bullets of the National Basketball League (NBL). He played college basketball for the Virginia Cavaliers.

== Early life and career ==
Murray was born in Hong Kong to New Zealand parents. He grew up in Auckland, New Zealand, where he attended Rosmini College. He began playing for Rosmini College's basketball team in 2017. He helped the team to an 82–14 record across his tenure, including national championships in 2017 and 2018, and a second-place finish in 2019. He scored a career-high 49 points in a win over Auckland Grammar School.

Murray joined the Auckland Huskies of the New Zealand National Basketball League (NZNBL) for the 2020 season. In 10 games, he averaged 17.8 points, 3.5 rebounds and 1.7 assists per game.

In August 2020, Murray joined the New Zealand Breakers of the Australian National Basketball League (NBL) for the 2020–21 season as a non-contracted development player. He appeared in just two games during the season, logging no box score statistics.

=== Recruiting ===
On 13 September 2020, following interest from multiple American college programs, Murray committed to the University of Virginia.

College recruiting
Name	Hometown	School	Height	Weight	Commit date
Taine Murray; SG	Auckland, New Zealand	Rosmini College (NZ)	6 ft 5 in (1.96 m)	190 lb (86 kg)	Sep 13, 2020
Taine Murray; SG	Recruit ratings: Rivals: 247Sports: (NR)				
Overall recruit ranking: Rivals: 77 247Sports: 82 ESPN: –
Note: In many cases, Scout, Rivals, 247Sports, On3, and ESPN may conflict in their listings of height and weight.; In these cases, the average was taken. ESPN grades are on a 100-point scale.; Sources: "Virginia 2021 Basketball Commitments". Rivals.; "2021 Virginia Commits". Scout.; "2021 Player Commits". ESPN.; "Scout.com Team Recruiting Rankings". Scout.; "2021 Team Ranking". Rivals.; "Virginia 2021 Basketball Commitments". 247Sports.

== College career ==
Murray played four seasons of college basketball for the Virginia Cavaliers between 2021 and 2025. In 96 career games, he averaged 3.0 points and 1.2 rebounds per game. As a senior, he averaged 4.1 points, 1.6 assists and 1.5 rebounds in over 18 minutes a game where he shot 42 per cent from three-point range. He also attended the McIntire School of Commerce, coming away with a degree in business management and minor in global commerce.

== Professional career ==
On 15 April 2025, Murray signed a two-year deal with the Brisbane Bullets of the NBL. He took on a bigger role very early in the 2025–26 season following the injury to Sam McDaniel.

On 4 March 2026, Murray signed with the Tauranga Whai for the 2026 New Zealand NBL season. On 18 July 2026, he scored 44 points in a 107–95 loss to the Wellington Saints.

On 3 September 2026, Murray was ruled out for four to six weeks with a lower limb injury, subsequently missing the start of the 2026–27 NBL season.

== National team career ==
Murray was named to the New Zealand team competing in the 2019 FIBA Under-17 Oceania Championships, averaging 7 points, 1 rebound and 1.5 assists per game.

He was called up to the senior New Zealand national team for the first time for a 2021 FIBA Asia Cup qualifier against Australia on 20 February 2021. Murray led the inexperienced team in scoring with 14 points as they fell 52–81.

In July 2025, Murray was named in the Tall Blacks squad for the 2025 FIBA Asia Cup.

In November 2025, Murray was named in the Tall Blacks squad for the first window of the FIBA Basketball World Cup 2027 Asian Qualifiers, as a replacement for Shea Ili. In February 2026, Murray was named in the squad for two more Asian qualifiers. In June 2026, he was named in the squad for another two Asian qualifiers. In November 2026, he was named in the squad for two more Asian qualifiers.

== Career statistics ==
Legend
GP	Games played	GS	Games started	MPG	Minutes per game
FG%	Field goal percentage	3P%	3-point field goal percentage	FT%	Free throw percentage
RPG	Rebounds per game	APG	Assists per game	SPG	Steals per game
BPG	Blocks per game	PPG	Points per game	**Bold**	Career high

=== College ===
Year	Team	GP	GS	MPG	FG%	3P%	FT%	RPG	APG	SPG	BPG	PPG
2021–22	Virginia	19	0	7.5	.394	.348	.500	.9	.1	.1	**.1**	2.0
2022–23	Virginia	13	0	7.2	.316	.167	**.667**	.9	.2	0	.2	1.4
2023–24	Virginia	**33**	**2**	**13.5**	**.482**	**.450**	.611	**1.2**	**.9**	**.2**	**.1**	**3.3**
Career		65	2	10.5	.437	.373	.594	1.1	.5	.1	.1	2.1

== Personal life ==
Murray's father, Carl, is a former rugby player in New Zealand.
