= Vaughan Going =

HK international rugby union player (born 1972)

- Full name: Vaughan Steven Going
- Born: 26 August 1972 (age 54) Whangārei, New Zealand
- Height: 5 ft 11 in (180 cm)
- Weight: 198 lb (90 kg)
- Notable relatives: Sid Going (uncle); Ken Going (uncle); Todd Miller (cousin)

Rugby union career
- Position: Utility back
Senior career
| Years | Team | Apps | (Points) |
| 1998–99 | Harlequins | | |
| 1999–00 | London Welsh | | |
| 2000–04 | Sale Sharks | | |
| 2004–05 | AS Béziers | | |
| 2005–06 | Bristol Bears | | |
| 2006–07 | Northampton Saints | | |
Provincial / State sides
| Years | Team | Apps | (Points) |
| 1991–93 | Waikato | 13 | (35) |
International career
| Years | Team | Apps | (Points) |
| 1994–98 | Hong Kong | 21 | (40) |

Vaughan Steven Going (born 26 August 1972) is a New Zealand former professional rugby union player.

== Biography ==
Born in Whangārei, Going is a nephew of former All Blacks halfback Sid Going.

=== Rugby career ===
Going featured most often as a fullback but could play all backline positions. He was a NZ Colt and played provincial rugby for Waikato from 1991 to 1993, then relocated to Hong Kong, where he turned out for Valley RFC. Between 1994 and 1998, Going competed on the Hong Kong national team and gained 21 caps, before leaving to join the ranks of professional rugby. He spent the next decade with Harlequins, London Welsh, Sale Sharks, AS Béziers, Bristol Bears and Northampton Saints. At the time of his retirement in 2007, Going was the oldest player in the English Premiership.

== See also ==
- List of Hong Kong national rugby union players
