= Hong Kong Scottish =

HK rugby union club, based in Hong Kong

(Hong Kong) KPMG HK Scottish
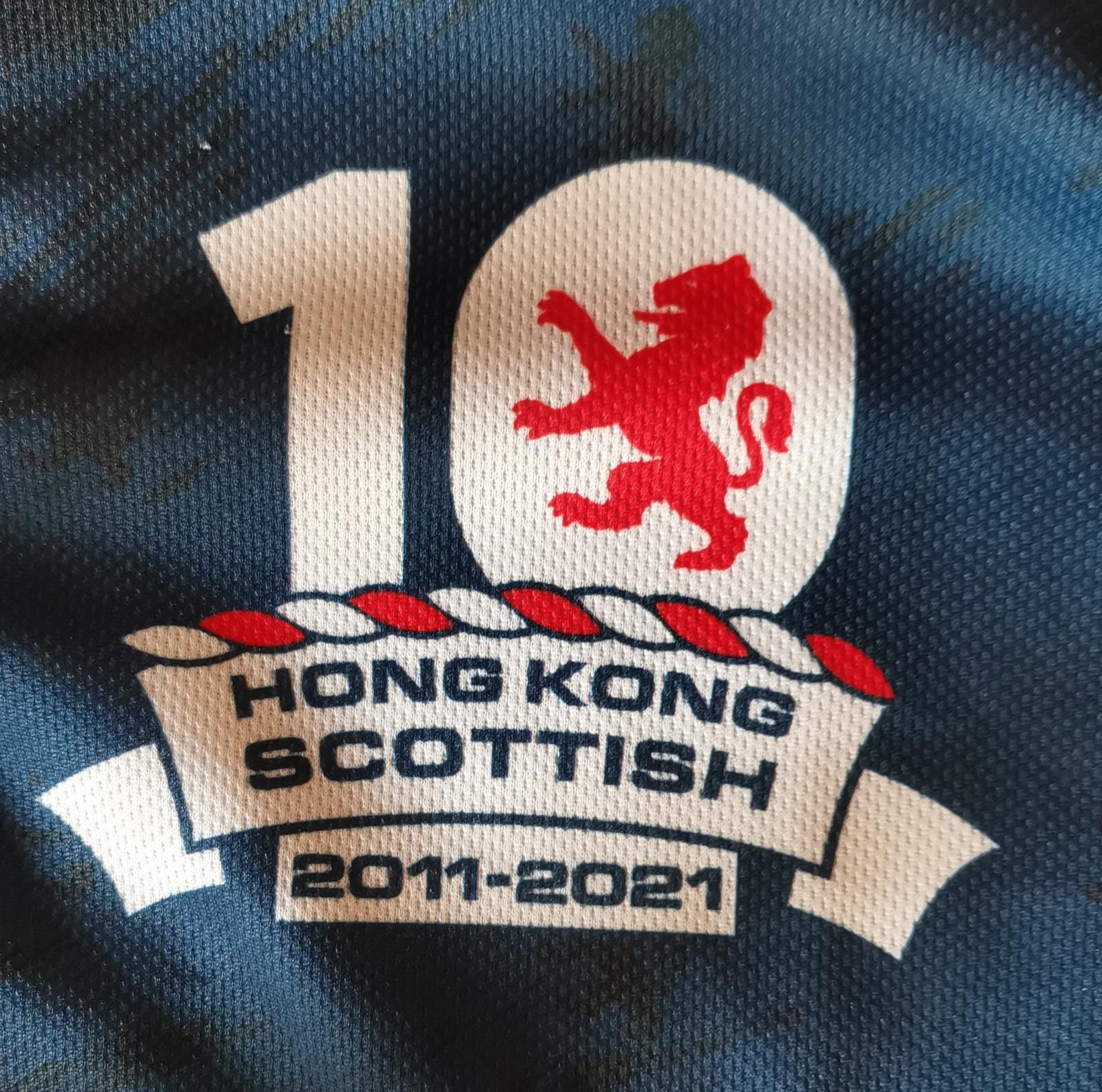
- Full name: Hong Kong Scottish RFC
- Founded: April 2011
- Location: Hong Kong
- Ground(s): Shek Kip Mei Park, Hong Kong (Capacity: 1,440)
- Chairman: Roy Kinnear
- President: Stewart H. Saunders MBE
- Coach: Alex Allan
- Captain: Gregor McNeish
- Top scorer: Gregor McNeish
- League: HKRFU Premiership
1st kit	2nd kit

Official website
- hongkongscottish.com

Hong Kong Scottish is a rugby football club in Hong Kong.

Over a century ago, exiled Scots in London formed London Scottish FC. In a similar vein, the HKRFU set up a new premiership team with the support of London Scottish, adopting their badge and sharing their colours (blue, white and red) as a mark of that relationship. This involved a group of exiled Scots engaging with the existing Nomads Rugby Club and building on a relationship with London Scottish and the strong Scottish community in Hong Kong. Hong Kong Scottish was thus formed, and in early April 2011 our club was launched, playing in the world famous Melrose Rugby Sevens – the birthplace of Rugby Sevens. The club entered into the domestic Premiership Division for the 2011/12 season.

Hong Kong Scottish runs four men's rugby teams and two women's rugby teams. The club's home ground is in the Shek Kip Mei area of Hong Kong and known as ‘The Rock’. The club has more than 600 members (of whom over 300 are playing members). In addition to rugby, the club is represented by two football teams, six senior netball and six junior netball sides.

Hong Kong Scottish has also developed partnerships with local charities including SoCO, Mind HK, ImpactHK and Changing Young Lives Foundation. Regular events give players and coaches the opportunity to teach local children from Shek Kip Mei and Sham Shui Po districts about rugby and fitness. Hong Kong Scottish is sponsored by business news provider KPMG – our title sponsor.

== History ==
Hong Kong Scottish rugby football club was formed in April 2011 and made its first appearance at the Melrose 7s – represented by a largely invitational side, predominantly featuring rugby players of Scottish ancestry playing in Hong Kong. They achieved a notable victory in their first match, defeating Boroughmuir 21–19, before narrowly losing 17–22 in the quarter-finals to Jedforest. David Tait, who played for Kowloon RFC at the time, scored the club's first ever try.

Summer 2011 was a busy time for the club in pulling together a squad for the first Premiership campaign. The first general manager of Hong Kong Scottish, former under-20 Scotland cap Dave Whiteford, existing Nomads head coach Craig Wilson and Nomads chairman, Jackie Hui were supported by a committee of local exiled Scots who recruited players to the new club. Scottish rugby legend Gavin Hastings agreed to lend his name as club ambassador to provide additional support and credibility to the venture. A number of rugby resumes were received by the club from players who were keen to sample rugby-playing life in the former colony. Those who were able to make the move joined the players from existing Hong Kong rugby side Nomads RFC and at the start of the 2011–12 season, Hong Kong Scottish were formed. The Nomads name survives as the moniker of the club's second team.

=== Season 2011–12 ===
Hong Kong Scottish enjoyed a number of successes in their first season in Hong Kong's domestic Premiership Division. The senior team, predominantly made up of ex-Scottish age-grade internationals and local Chinese players, won a record number of games for a debut side in the Premiership, finishing the season with five wins and seven losses. A four-game winning streak saw the team go undefeated in December and January. Wins over five of the six other teams in the league, including a famous opening day win over eventual League Champions Kowloon, ensured qualification for the Grand Championship play-offs. The team came up against eventual Grand Final winners HKFC, the only side against whom they did not record a league victory, and lost heavily 3–49.

Stars of the campaign included fly half James Murray, flanker Niall Shannon and full back Dave Whiteford. Murray and Shannon top scored with four tries, Whiteford recorded three and player of the year Murray also took on kicking duties to finish the season on 126 points.

Reserve side Nomads finished 3rd in Community 1 and were narrowly edged out by an experienced Valley Mustangs team in the Grand Championship semi-final. HK Scottish 3rd XV endured a tough season after moving from the Development league into Community League 3. The team did manage one victory, an incredible achievement given that most of the team had only taken up rugby at the start of the 2011–12 season.

During the year, Hong Kong Scottish developed a close relationship with Flying Kukris, who now serve as the youth section feeding into the club. Scottish provided coaching to the youngsters on a weekly basis, an initiative which was overseen by head coach Craig Wilson. The club also provided coaching to Tin Shui Wai youth section, spreading the reach of the club to the new territories, and both Flying Kukris and Tin Shui Wai have served as ball boys and girls for Hong Kong Scottish home premiership matches.

During the season, the club took part in a gala day to welcome Scottish First Minister Alex Salmond to Hong Kong, raising awareness of Hong Kong rugby in Scotland. The event served as a springboard in the developing relationship between the HKRFU and the SRU. As a direct result, the SRU sent four Scotland 7s players to play for the Scottish Barbarians at the Hong Kong Tens tournament in March 2012.

The season culminated with a second trip to the Melrose 7s, where the first team lost 12–31 in the second round to Glasgow Hawks, and the Hong Kong Scottish veterans won the veterans plate at the tournament.

=== Season 2012–13 ===
Hong Kong Scottish made their intentions known early in summer 2012 with the appointment of 33-year old ex-Nottingham Rugby captain Craig Hammond as their new Club Coaching Officer. Hammond's experience as a player was invaluable to the young Scottish pack and, having captained the Barbarians in his final game in the UK, he started in every game for Hong Kong Scottish in the 2012–13 season.

The first XV capped a fine second season with a fourth-place finish in the league after a memorable 19–13 victory over HKFC, the only team they had yet to beat, in the final league game of the season. Full back Will Tuffley, who had taken over kicking duties halfway through the season from James Murray, was the star of the game with one try, one conversion and four penalties to record all 19 points for Scottish for what was then an individual points record for one player in a match. Tuffley top-scored for the team during the season, recording 85 points, with Murray second on 53 points. Fijian Joe Nabou, who signed from Premiership rivals Causeway Bay, was an instant hit with the team. As well as adding bulk and experience to the pack, Nabou ended the season as the club's top try scorer with seven tries. Prop Jamie Pincott won player of the year honours, while Craig Hammond was named Hong Kong's Coach of the Year at the annual Hong Kong Rugby Football Union awards’ dinner. For the second season in succession, the team lost in the quarter-finals of the Grand Championship to the eventual winners. This time, despite home advantage, Scottish lost to a resurgent Valley side by 11–24.

Hong Kong Scottish Nomads found the going tough in their first season in Premiership A Division. A step up from the level they had played at the previous year, the Nomads sometimes struggled to put out a competitive side but sustained enough small margin losses to give the club confidence that the team were heading in the right direction. The Hong Kong Scottish Bravehearts, the club's newly named 3rd XV side, were the season's success story, winning the club their first ever domestic silverware. The Bravehearts – predominantly made up of local Chinese players playing rugby in their first or second season – won the domestic Community 3A league title and Grand Championship. The team developed superbly as the season progressed, beat TSW 32–17 in the semi-final and, led by player/coach Mark Jones, defeated an experienced Typhoons 2nds team 22–6 in the March Grand Final. Tries from Naim Roux, TszYeung Calvin and Jones were key, with Alan Wong slotting a penalty and two conversions.

Off the field, the club further developed its community programme in conjunction with Edinburgh Napier University, running coaching sessions across Hong Kong with the Flying Kukris, Tsuen Wan Rhinos and Discovery Bay Pirates. In addition, the club linked up with the Changing Young Lives Foundation to expose children from disadvantaged backgrounds to rugby for the first time through the Pass It On campaign and the first ever Hong Kong Scottish Easter kids’ camp was organised, promoting rugby to a wider than ever local audience.

These initiatives did not go unnoticed by the sport's governing body and the club won the prestigious "31 Trophy" at the HKRFU annual dinner. The award is presented annually by the Hong Kong Society of Rugby Football Union Referees to the team which by their conduct have done most to enhance the reputation of the game of Rugby Football in Hong Kong.

=== Season 2013–14 ===
Once again, Hong Kong Scottish finished fourth in the Paul Y Premiership, finishing the season with six wins and one draw in a 15-game campaign. A scintillating campaign saw them run in 41 tries over the season and twice break their own record victory margin – on both occasions defeating Borelli Walsh Tigers, firstly by 64–10 in November and then by 74–20 in February. The 10 tries scored in the February game remains a club record.

The club twice captured the Broony Quaich, the Hong Kong equivalent of the Ranfurly Shield and a cup which was launched in 2013/14 in honour of Ian "Broony" Brown, a local rugby stalwart and former Hong Kong team manager who died earlier in 2013. (source: SCMP fri 14 October 2013). Their first success came at Kings Park in November, where they defeated Kowloon 27–12, whilst their second victory was a 16–9 win over Valley in February. On both occasions, the club could only hold onto the Quaich for one week, losing their next home game. Though a 36–23 loss to Valley in November was disappointing, the 23–21 loss to HKFC in February provided one of the season's main talking points. With no scoreboard at The Rock, miscommunication meant that both teams believed they had won the game. However, the confusion soon subsided and the Quaich was presented to a delighted HKFC, of whom "Broony" had been a Club member. An electronic scoreboard has been at every Hong Kong Scottish game since.

Individually, the calibre of player attracted to the club in this, their third, season continued to grow. 18 different players ran in tries during the season, with Dave Whiteford (seven) and Adrian Griffiths (six) leading the way. Even coach Craig Hammond got in on the act with a memorable two try performance at Kings Park against Tigers in December. Former USA scrum-half Tim Usasz, who had played in the 2011 World Cup in New Zealand, joined the club as a player/assistant coach. Usasz had played alongside Hammond at Nottingham Rugby and the two rekindled their relationship to become a strong coaching partnership.

Despite losing top scorer James Murray, who returned to the UK to enhance his career after two years at the club, Scottish were able to sign a replacement from Ampo Ordizia in the Spanish Premiership in Danny Kroll. Kroll had previously played in Australia with Randwick and Sydney University and was an instant success. Kroll finished the season with five tries, 37 penalties, 31 conversions and four drop goals, for a combined total of 210 points, and smashed a number of club records in his only season with the team. Kroll scored the most points for one player in a season, most points for one player in one game (achieving a record 29 points on two separate occasions) and slotted a record three drop goals in one game. With 210 points, he remains the club's all-time top points scorer and has more drop goals for the club than any other Hong Kong Scottish player.

Hong Kong Scottish Nomads improved as the year progressed under the coaching of Anthony Hopewell, but had a tough year in the third tier National League 1, finishing without a win in 14 games. The Hong Kong Scottish Bravehearts continued their success story from the previous year, winning the Community 4C grand final. The success of the young side was further exemplified by the development of Alan Wong, who played for the Nomads in a higher tier of rugby on numerous occasions.

2013/14 saw the launch and first season of Hong Kong Scottish Kukris, a joint venture with women's team Flying Kukris, who competed in the HK Women's XV league. The team was led by HK international Rosie Fong, who along with Dave Whiteford in the men's game, earned Hong Kong international honours in both 7s and 15s rugby.

In the community, initiatives with Enlighten, Sarah Roe School, YMCA school and many more saw Craig Wilson, Danny Kroll and Lex Kaleca heavily involved throughout the year as the club further extended their community programme to ensure that children received greater exposure to rugby through a school coaching programme. A new initiative to reward lifetime members saw the introduction of Life Members Lunches. The events had a very Scottish flavour and included an after dinner speaker from the world of rugby, lunch and drinks, followed by a Hong Kong Scottish home game at Shek Kip Mei. John Elliot of Langholm rugby fame was the first speaker, while Iain "The Bear" Milne spoke at a lunch to commemorate the 30th anniversary of Scotland's 1984 Grand Slam triumph.

=== Season 2014–15 ===
Hong Kong Scottish had their most successful season to date in 2014/15, finishing second in the league after challenging for top spot throughout the year. They recorded 11 wins, one draw and just three losses, only just missing out on top spot in the penultimate week of the season. The Rock was a fortress, the side remaining undefeated at home during the regular season, but once again, the post season campaign was short-lived. The team narrowly lost 13–17 to eventual Grand Championship winners Valley in the semi-final at Shek Kip Mei.

The club held the Broony Quaich for most of the season, winning it in the opening game against HKFC and by virtue of their home record, holding it all season until the aforementioned loss to Valley. Once again, the club's positive reputation and determination to do things the right way was recognised and they won the 31 trophy at the HKRFU annual awards’ dinner.

On the playing side, there were further personnel changes and, although the club were unable to hold onto Danny Kroll, some inspired signings helped the club to strengthen once again. Andrew Henderson, Bryan Rennie, Len Ascroft-Leigh were signed from English Championship sides Ealing Trailfinders, Bristol Rugby and Plymouth Albion respectively. Kane Boucaut, Austin Smith and Diggy Bird flew in from the University of Queensland and made equally positive contributions to the club. Henderson and Rennie brought a new level of skill to the backs and top-scored with nine and seven tries respectively, whilst Bird was excellent in front of goal and potted 178 points in total. The club again broke the 40 try barrier for the season.

The additional depth and experience helped existing players to grow in stature. Centre Lex Kaleca was player of the year in his second season with the club, whilst Charles Cheung, Jack Parfitt, Lachlan Chubb and John Aikman earned international honours, representing Hong Kong in games against Russia, Japan and Korea. The club's development programme received a boost when Ale Nardoni and Sjors Laurijsen were both selected to represent Hong Kong in the under-20 Junior World Trophy in Portugal. Forwards Luke Davey and Aikman were rewarded for their longevity with the club and both were honoured after reaching 50 appearances for the first team.

Hong Kong Scottish Nomads made significant progress in National League 1, reaching their semi-final and finishing with a record of six wins and seven losses. Doug Brown was Nomads’ players player of the year, with Jimmy Cheung picking up the award for the Hong Kong Scottish Bravehearts, who didn't end the season with a trophy for the first time in three season, but did make the semi-final and had a winning record in National League 4. Hong Kong Scottish Kukris were beaten by HKFC in the final of the women's rugby tournament, with Jeronsica Kwok receiving player of the year honours at the end of season club dinner.

In the community, Hong Kong international scrum half Charles Cheung was heavily involved in coaching children from local schools and the club were proud to work with chosen charities The Hub and Changing Young Lives Foundation. The success of the Life Members Lunches continued with guest speakers Craig Chalmers and David Sole flying out from Scotland to headline the events as speakers.

=== Season 2015–16 ===
A positive start to the season saw Hong Kong Scottish start with two victories from three games. The pick of the bunch was a 34–15 victory over reigning league title holders HKCC at Aberdeen Sports Ground – a 31-point second half performance included tries from Ben Cullen, Lachlan Chubb, Jack Parfitt and Lex Kaleca to recapture the Broony Quaich.

Injuries and visa applications hit from October onwards and the team lost five of their next six games to go into the Christmas break win in 5th place in the league, just one place from bottom.

The Club continued to develop in other areas though, with positive performances from development sides and increased membership across the various sports. Life Members Lunches saw an appearance in Hong Kong from Tony Stanger, with former Scotland and British & Irish Lions head coach Iain McGeechan OBE set to speak at an event in January.

== Stadium ==
All Hong Kong Scottish rugby sides play their home games at Shek Kip Mei Park Sports Centre on Nam Cheong Street in Shek Kip Mei. The stadium, affectionately known as The Rock due to the steep wall behind one goal, is the northernmost home ground in the Hong Kong Premiership.

== Club honours ==
=== Individual ===
Year(s)	Recipient	Honour
2013	Craig Hammond	HKRFU Coach of the Year
2015	Jack Parfitt	HKRFU Coach's Player of the Year
2015	Rosie Fong	HKRFU Women's 7s Player of the Year

== Key personnel ==
=== Presidents ===
2015–current	Stewart H. Saunders

=== Chairmen ===
2011	Jason Collello
2012–2015	Stewart H. Saunders
2015–2019	David A. Bruce
2019–current	Roy Kinnear

=== General managers ===
2011–2014	David Whiteford
2015–2019	Bryan Rennie
2019-2022	Sarah Monaghan
2022–2024	Paul Renouf
2024–Present	Charlotte Hancock

=== Coaches ===
2011–2012	Craig Wilson
2012–2021	Craig Hammond
2021-2022	Peter Jericevich
2022–current	Alex Allan (rugby union)

=== Club captains ===
2012–2015	Craig Wilson
2015–2016	Stephen Dowse
2016-2018	Jamie Pincott
2018–2021	Josh Dowsing
2021–current	Gregor McNeish

=== First XV players of the year ===
2011–12	James Murray
2012–13	Jamie Pincott
2013–14	Danny Kroll
2014–15	Lex Kaleca
2015–16	
2016–17	
2017–18	Josh Dowsing
2018–19	Sean Taylor

== Notable players ==
=== International recognition ===
Country	Player	Number of Caps	Debut
(Hong Kong)	Charles Cheung	10	vs Kazakhstan, 2009
(Hong Kong)	Jack Parfitt	38	vs Russia, 2014
(Hong Kong)	Lachlan Chubb	6	vs Japan, 2014
(Hong Kong)	John Aikman	6	vs Russia, 2014
(Hong Kong)	Dave Whiteford	4	vs UAE, 2013
(Hong Kong)	Lex Kaleca	3	vs Zimbabwe, 2015
(Hong Kong)	Jamie Pincott	5	vs Zimbabwe, 2015
(Hong Kong)	Craig Wilson	2	vs Zimbabwe, 2012
(Hong Kong)	Kane Boucaut	14	vs Kenya, 2013
(Hong Kong)	Mick Parfitt	12	vs Russia, 2014
(Hong Kong)	Conor Hartley	10	vs Zimbabwe, 2015
(Hong Kong)	Kyle Sullivan	6	vs Zimbabwe, 2015
(Hong Kong)	Faizal Solomona	3	vs Malaysia, 2019
(Hong Kong)	Josh Dowsing	2	vs Belgium, 2019
(Hong Kong)	Gregor McNeish	1	vs Belgium, 2019

=== Appearance records ===
(data correct to December 31, 2015)

Rank
Player

No. of Appearances

in Starting XV

1
Jamie Pincott

107
2
Jack Parfitt

96
3
Dave Whiteford

48
4
Luke Davey

45
5
Lachlan Chubb

36
6
Lex Kaleca

36
7
Craig Wilson

34
8
Craig Hammond

28
9
James Murray

26
10
Charles Cheung

26
11
Adrian Griffiths

23
12
Joe Nabou

23
13
Austin Smith

23
14
Len Ascroft-Leigh

22
15
Stephen Dowse

22
16
Kane Boucaut

22
17
Alex Kaihau

21
18
Bryan Rennie

19
19
Andrew Brown

18
20
Diggy Bird

18

== Club sections ==
The Club boasts over 500 members, of which almost 300 are playing members across four sports.

Men's Rugby	Women's Rugby	Football	Netball	Lacrosse
Bloomberg Hong Kong Scottish (1st XV)	HKS Kukris	HKS Stags	HKS Nessies	HKS Lassies
Hong Kong Scottish Nomads (2nd XV)	HKS Kelpies	HKS Eagles	HKS Thistles	
Hong Kong Scottish Bravehearts (3rd XV)			HKS Pipers	
Hong Kong Scottish Phoenix (4th XV)			HKS Whiskies	
			HKS Highlanders	

== Social calendar ==
The club has an active social calendar. Each August/September, the club host Hong Kong Scottish Day to introduce new players, launch the season and host Men's and Women's 7s and 10s tournaments. At the end of the rugby season, around March/April, the club hosts its annual dinner for all members from all sections of the club. During the year, the clubs hosts Life Members Lunches and various events for playing club members.

== Club sponsors ==
Hong Kong Scottish are currently sponsored by KPMG who have backed the club since the start of the 2014–15 season.

Title Sponsor KPMG

Community Sponsor

KPMG

Official kit sponsors

Sea-Air Logistics, KPMG, Mazars, Bloomberg L.P., Executive Knowledge, Apprentice Holdings, ScotHong, BruceRae, Murray & Currie Properties, Milwaukee Tool Asia, Tsunami,

Official sponsors

Joe Bananas, Pilsner Urquell, Copula Corporate Finance, Bobby's Rabble, Wyndham St,

Official partners

Bill McLaren Foundation, Fivez Fitness & Wellness, St. Andrew's Society of Hong Kong, Healthy Little Foodies
