= Rodney McIntosh =

- Full name: Rodney Noel McIntosh
- Born: 26 April 1967 (age 59) Hamilton, New Zealand
- Height: 5 ft 11 in (180 cm)
- Weight: 220 lb (100 kg)

Rugby union career
- Position: Centre
Provincial / State sides
Years	Team	Apps	(Points)
1986–92	Waikato	51	(65)
International career
Years	Team	Apps	(Points)
- Hong Kong

Rodney Noel McIntosh (born 26 April 1967) is a New Zealand former rugby union player.

Born in Hamilton, McIntosh was a NZ Colt who played with Waikato in the National Provincial Championship from 1986 to 1992, contributing to a title-winning side his final year. He represented NZ Maori and was an All Blacks trialist.

McIntosh relocated to Hong Kong in 1994, on the invitation of the territory's newly appointed coach George Simpkin. He joined Hong Kong Football Club and immediately made it into the national team, which were trying to qualify for the 1995 Rugby World Cup. The team were unsuccessful in this attempt but McIntosh later represented Hong Kong at the 1997 Rugby World Cup Sevens, in addition to seven appearances in the Hong Kong Sevens.

After returning to New Zealand, McIntosh was appointed Director of High Performance Sport and Rugby at St Andrew's College, Christchurch, having previously served as head coach of Hong Kong in rugby sevens.

== See also ==
- List of Hong Kong national rugby union players
