= Dave Whiteford =

Hong Kong rugby union player (born 1985)

- Born: David Whiteford; 25 November 1985 (age 40) Castlecraig, Nigg, Highland, Scotland
- Height: 1.93 m (6 ft 4 in)
- Weight: 95 kg (14 st 13 lb)
- School: Tain Royal Academy
- University: Edinburgh Napier University

Rugby union career
- Position: Centre / Wing
Amateur team(s)
Years	Team	Apps	(Points)
- Peebles
2004-16	Melrose		
–	Hong Kong Scottish		
Senior career
Years	Team	Apps	(Points)
2008-09	Glasgow Warriors	2	(0)
International career
Years	Team	Apps	(Points)
- Scotland U21
2013	Hong Kong	4	(0)

Dave Whiteford (born 25 November 1985) is a Scottish-born former Hong Kong international rugby union player. Born in Castlecraig, Nigg, Scotland, he played as a Wing for Glasgow Warriors, Melrose, Peebles, Melbourne Rugby Club, Valley and Hong Kong Scottish.

== Early life ==
Whiteford has a degree in marketing from Edinburgh Napier University in Edinburgh. He also has a Masters of Business Administration from Edinburgh Napier University.

== Rugby Union career ==
=== Amateur career ===
Whiteford played with Peebles and Melrose at an amateur level. He signed for Melrose at the start of the 2004–05 season.

Whiteford got to the final of the Melrose Sevens in 2004–05 with Melrose RFC. This was repeated in 2008–09.

He won the Scottish Hydro Electric Cup in 2007–08 with Melrose.

In 2009 Whiteford moved to the Southern Hemisphere to play for Melbourne Rugby Club to widen his rugby experience.

Whiteford later played for the amateur clubs Valley, where he won the Hong Kong Premiership in 2011, and Hong Kong Scottish. He took the Hong Kong Scottish side to the Melrose Sevens in 2011 and 2012.

=== Professional career ===
He was a back-up player for Glasgow Warriors in the 2008-09 season.

He played for the Warriors in their pre-season matches against Castres Olympique and Béziers in the XV Challenge Vaquerin tournament.

=== International career ===
Whiteford played for Scotland U21.

After a period of residency in Hong Kong he became eligible to play for, and represented, the Hong Kong national rugby union team. He played for Hong Kong against Japan on 17 April 2013.

=== Administration ===
He was appointed as General Manager of Hong Kong Scottish in 2011 He works for the Scottish Rugby Union as Sponsorship Manager.
