= Callum McFeat Smith =

Hong Kong rugby union player (born 1996)

- Born: 8 March 1996 (age 30) Hong Kong
- Height: 1.88 m (6 ft 2 in)
- Weight: 103 kg (16 st 3 lb)

Rugby union career
- Position: Prop
Amateur team(s)
Years	Team	Apps	(Points)
2020-22	Hong Kong Football Club		
2023-25	Boroughmuir RFC		
2025-	Hong Kong Football Club		
Senior career
Years	Team	Apps	(Points)
2019-22	South China Tigers		
2023-25	Glasgow Warriors		
Super Rugby
Years	Team	Apps	(Points)
2022-23	Boroughmuir Bears		
International career
Years	Team	Apps	(Points)
2017-	Hong Kong	1	(0)

Callum McFeat Smith (born 8 March 1996) is a Hong Kong international rugby union player. He plays rugby union for Hong Kong Football Club. He previously played for Glasgow Warriors, and Boroughmuir Bears in the Super 6. He has also played for the amateur side Boroughmuir.

== Rugby Union career ==
=== Amateur career ===
Between 2020 and 2022 he played rugby union for Hong Kong Football Club.

After the SRU cut the funding for the professional side Boroughmuir Bears, McFeat-Smith turned out for their analogous amateur side Boroughmuir.

=== Professional career ===
He played for South China Tigers between 2019 and 2022 in the Global Rapid Rugby tournament.

He played for the Boroughmuir Bears in the Super 6 league in season 2022-23.

He played for Glasgow Warriors in the pre-season friendly against Zebre at the Stadio Sergio Lanfranchi in Italy on 30 August 2024. Franco Smith praised the young side despite their defeat. Of McFeat-Smith he said: 'Callum McFeat Smith, too, is an example of a player that we believe can make the step up from Super Series or Premiership action – we’ve had him in our environment for a while now and he gave a good account of himself.'

He played in 6 May 2025's Glasgow Warriors U23 match against Benetton Treviso.

=== International career ===
Born in Hong Kong, with a Scottish father and Pilipino mother, McFeat-Smith was quickly ear-marked for the Hong Kong national side.

He was capped for Hong Kong for their match against Kenya on 18 November 2017. He was an unused substitute the previous week for their match against Russia on 10 November 2017. McFeat-Smith was in the Hong Kong squad that played Dragons 'A' side in October 2018.

McFeat-Smith was named in their September 2025 squad for Hong Kong's tour of Japan.
