= Ashley Billington =

- Born: Ashley Billington; 16 January 1969 (age 57)
- Height: 6 ft 4 in (1.93 m)
- Weight: 208 lb (94 kg)
- University: Loughborough University

Rugby union career
- Position: Wing
Senior career
Years	Team	Apps	(Points)
- Loughborough Students
International career
Years	Team	Apps	(Points)
1992–1999	Hong Kong	22	(156)

Ashley Billington (born 16 January 1969) is a former Hong Kong rugby union international. He represented Hong Kong from 1992 to 1999.

== Rugby union career ==
Billington made his international debut on 23 October 1992 at Dubai International Sevens. Of the matches, he played for his national side he was on the winning side on many occasions.

He played his final XVs match for Hong Kong on 31 October 1998 at Jalan Besar Stadium in the Hong Kong vs Japan match. In 1994 he scored a world record 50 points (10 tries) in a single match against Singapore in a Rugby World Cup Qualifier.

After his rugby days had passed, he taught at Hong Kong International School as a P.E. Instructor. Billington is still teaching P.E. at HKIS, an international school in Hong Kong, as of 2024. At HKIS, Billington has had a great reputation and is often considered as one of the students' favorite P.E. teachers.
