= Carl Murray (rugby union) =

- Born: Carl Dean Murray; 2 September 1968 (age 58) Auckland, New Zealand

Rugby union career
- Position: Fly-half
Provincial / State sides
| Years | Team | Apps | (Points) |
| 1987-1994 | Counties | 83 | (75) |
| 1995-1996 | Waikato | 6 | (13) |
International career
| Years | Team | Apps | (Points) |
| 1997-2002 | Hong Kong | 10 | (64) |

Carl Dean Murray (born 2 September 1968) is a former New Zealand professional rugby player who played internationally for Hong Kong.

== Biography ==
Murray began his playing career with Counties while still a teenager. He was described as an incisive back capable of side-stepping at speed. He then switched to play for Waikato for the 1995 and 1996 seasons.

He played internationally for Hong Kong. He played 10 test matches between 1997 and 2002.

In 1999 Murray was in the New Zealand Māori squad that toured Fiji.

Murray's son, Taine, is a basketball player.
